= 2026 Oregon State Senate election =

- November 3, 2026

15 of 30 seats in the Oregon State Senate 16 seats needed for a majority
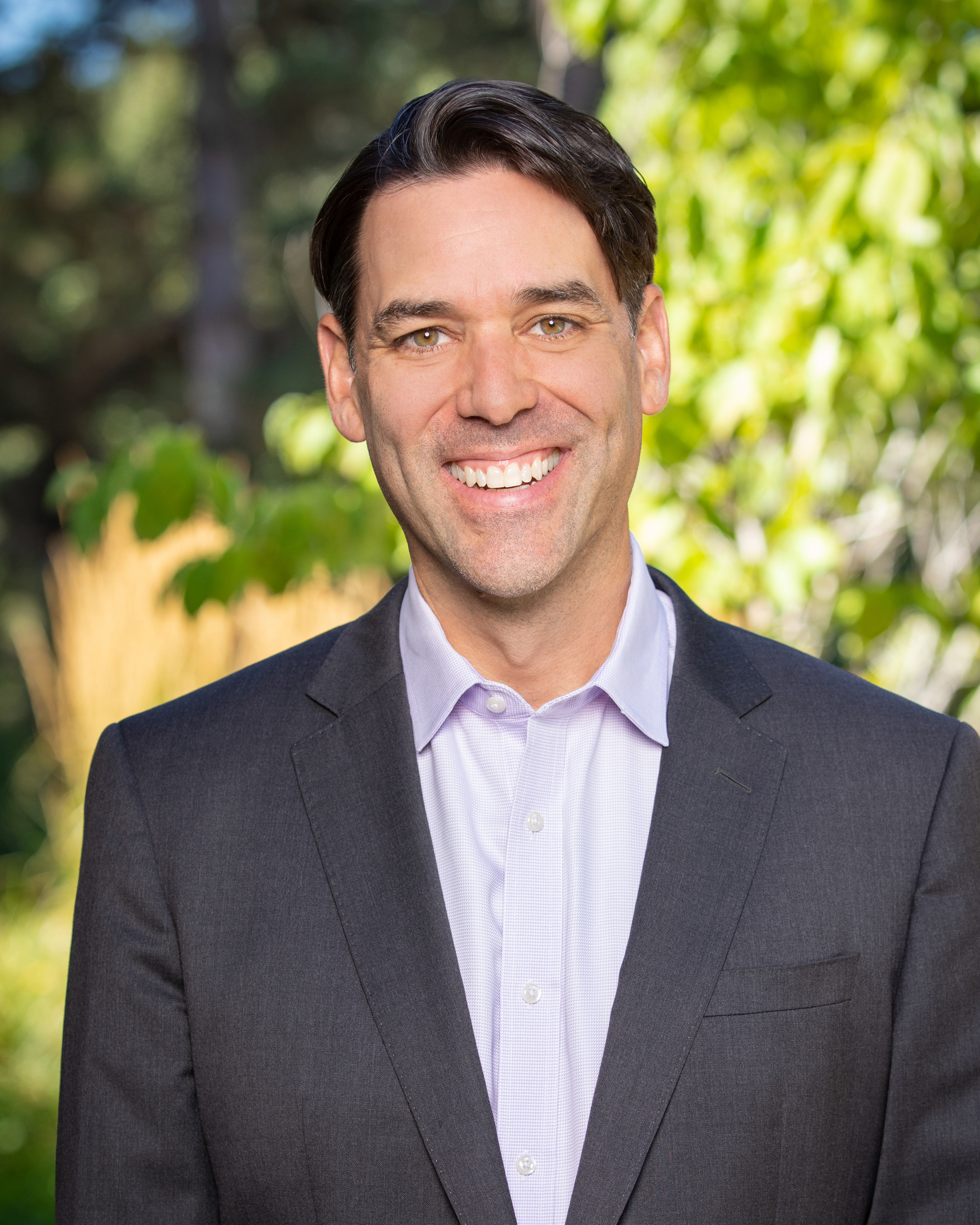

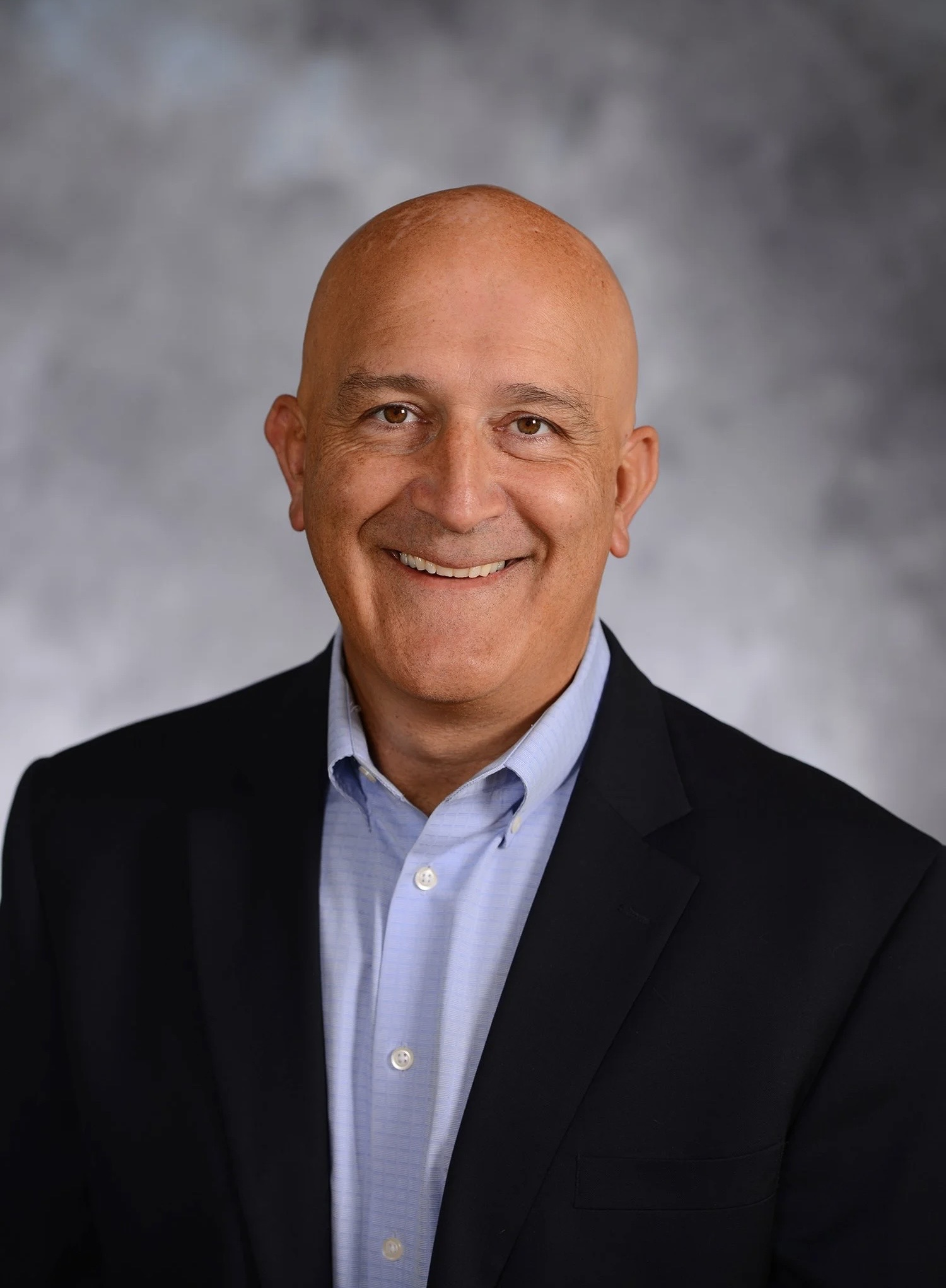
	Majority party	Minority party
Leader	Rob Wagner	Bruce Starr
Party	Democratic	Republican
Leader since	January 9, 2023	September 15, 2025
Leader's seat	19–Lake Oswego	12–Dundee
Last election	18 seats	12 seats
Seats won	19	11
Seat change	▲1	▼1
President before election
Rob Wagner
Democratic
Elected President
TBD

The 2026 Oregon Senate election was held on November 3, 2026, alongside the other 2026 United States elections. Voters elected half the members of the Oregon Senate in the U.S. state of Oregon to serve a four-year term.

== Electoral system ==
The 15 members of the Senate up for election were elected from single-member districts via first-past-the-post voting for four-year terms.

Contested nominations of recognized major parties (Democratic and Republican) for each district are determined by a primary election on May 19, 2026.

Minor party candidates are nominated by petition. Write-in candidates must file a request with the Secretary of State's office for votes for them to be counted. Candidates for the state Senate in 2026 are required to file to run from September 11, 2025, to March 10, 2026.

== Outgoing incumbents ==
=== Retirements ===
- Jeff Golden (D–Ashland), representing district 3 since 2019, is retiring.

=== Seeking other office ===
- Christine Drazan (R–Canby), representing district 26 since 2025, is retiring to run for governor.

=== Disqualified ===
- Cedric Ross Hayden (R–Fall Creek), representing district 6 since 2023, was barred from seeking re-election.
- Kim Thatcher (R–Keizer), representing district 11 since 2023, was barred from seeking re-election.
- Suzanne Weber (R–Tillamook), representing district 16 since 2023, was barred from seeking re-election.

=== Lost renomination ===
- Janeen Sollman (D–Hillsboro), representing district 15 since 2022, lost renomination to Myrna Muñoz

== Predictions ==
Source	Ranking	As of
Sabato's Crystal Ball	Safe D	January 22, 2026
State Navigate	Safe D	October 24, 2026

== District overview ==
Shaded cells indicate retiring senators. Bold text indicates seats that flipped parties.

District	Incumbent	Party	Previous Margin of victory	Elected Senator	Party
3rd	Jeff Golden	Dem	3.86%	Denise Krause	Dem
4th	Floyd Prozanski	Dem	64.11%	Floyd Prozanski	Dem
6th	Cedric Hayden	Rep	30.62%	Jack Tibbetts	Rep
7th	James Manning Jr.	Dem	29.08%	James Manning Jr.	Dem
8th	Sara Gelser Blouin	Dem	19.65%	Sara Gelser Blouin	Dem
10th	Deb Patterson	Dem	6.93%	Deb Patterson	Dem
11th	Kim Thatcher	Rep	5.15%	**Virginia Stapleton**	Dem
13th	Courtney Neron Misslin	Dem	16.15%	Courtney Neron Misslin	Dem
15th	Janeen Sollman	Dem	11.12%	Myrna Muñoz	Dem
16th	Suzanne Weber	Rep	13.13%	Courtney Bangs	Rep
17th	Lisa Reynolds	Dem	57.98%	Lisa Reynolds	Dem
19th	Rob Wagner	Dem	32.18%	Rob Wagner	Dem
20th	Mark Meek	Dem	0.81%	Mark Meek	Dem
24th	Kayse Jama	Dem	17.55%	Kayse Jama	Dem
26th	Christine Drazan	Rep	18.31%	Jeff Helfrich	Rep

== Detailed results ==
=== District 3 ===
Incumbent Democrat Jeff Golden declined to seek re-election.

Democratic primary results
Party	Candidate	Votes	%
Democratic	Denise Krause	6,078	35.31
Democratic	Tonia Moro	5,869	34.09
Democratic	Cristian Mendoza Ruvalcaba	3,051	17.72
Democratic	Kevin Stine	1,766	10.26
Democratic	Jim Crary	369	2.14
Write-in		82	0.48
Total votes		17,215	100.00

Oregon's 3rd Senate district results
Party	Candidate	Votes	%
Democratic	Denise Krause		
Republican	Brad Hicks		
Write-in			
Total votes			

=== District 4 ===
Incumbent Democrat Floyd Prozanski is running for re-election.

Oregon's 4th Senate district results
Party	Candidate	Votes	%
Democratic	Floyd Prozanski (incumbent)		
Republican	TBD		
Write-in			
Total votes			100.00

=== District 6 ===
Incumbent Republican Cedric Ross Hayden was barred from seeking re-election.

Republican primary results
Party	Candidate	Votes	%
Republican	Jack Tibbetts	10,964	51.03
Republican	Jami Cate	9,503	44.23
Republican	Nicole De Graff	949	4.42
Write-in		69	0.32
Total votes		21,485	100.00

Oregon's 6th Senate district results
Party	Candidate	Votes	%
Republican	Jack Tibbetts		
Democratic	Sierrah Williams		
Write-in			
Total votes			100.00

=== District 7 ===
Incumbent Democrat James Manning Jr. is running for re-election.

Oregon's 7th Senate district results
Party	Candidate	Votes	%
Democratic	James Manning Jr. (incumbent)		
Republican	Jack Huff		
Write-in			
Total votes			100.00

=== District 8 ===
Incumbent Democrat Sara Gelser Blouin is running for re-election.

Oregon's 8th Senate district results
Party	Candidate	Votes	%
Democratic	Sara Gelser Blouin (incumbent)		
Republican	Valerie Draper Woldeit		
Write-in			
Total votes			100.00

=== District 10 ===
Incumbent Democrat Deb Patterson is running for re-election.

Oregon's 10th Senate district results
Party	Candidate	Votes	%
Democratic	Deb Patterson (incumbent)		
Republican	Angela Plowhead		
Write-in			
Total votes			100.00

=== District 11 ===
Incumbent Republican Kim Thatcher was barred from seeking re-election.

Democratic primary results
Party	Candidate	Votes	%
Democratic	Virginia Stapleton	4,947	67.65
Democratic	Teresa Alonso Leon	2,325	31.79
Write-in		41	0.56
Total votes		7,313	100.00

Oregon's 11th Senate district results
Party	Candidate	Votes	%
Democratic	Virginia Stapleton		
Republican	Tracy Cramer		
Write-in			
Total votes			100.00

=== District 13 ===
Incumbent Democrat Courtney Neron Misslin is running for re-election.

Oregon's 13th Senate district results
Party	Candidate	Votes	%
Democratic	Courtney Neron Misslin (incumbent)		
Republican	Glenn Lancaster		
Write-in			
Total votes			100.00

=== District 15 ===
Incumbent Democrat Janeen Sollman ran for re-election. She lost renomination to educator Myrna Muñoz. Muñoz announced her campaign against Sollman, a centrist Democrat, in part to provide a more progressive alternative. She made opposition to AI data centers and ICE a major part of her platform. Her campaign additionally drew support from organized labor and various advocacy groups. The contest was described as a factional battle between the party's centrist and left wing factions.

Muñoz defeated Sollman by a six-point margin and went on to defeat Republican Harold Hutchinson in the general election.

Democratic primary results
Party	Candidate	Votes	%
Democratic	Myrna Muñoz	6,678	51.79
Democratic	Janeen Sollman (incumbent)	5,885	45.64
Democratic	Nelly Donis-Purcell	283	2.19
Write-in		49	0.38
Total votes		12,895	100.00

Oregon's 15th Senate district results
Party	Candidate	Votes	%
Democratic	Myrna Muñoz		
Republican	Harold Hutchinson		
Write-in			
Total votes			100.00

=== District 16 ===
Incumbent Republican Suzanne Weber was barred from seeking re-election.

Republican primary results
Party	Candidate	Votes	%
Republican	Courtney Bangs	10,289	62.36
Republican	Tripp Dietrich	4,981	30.19
Republican	Frank Masterfield	1,146	6.95
Write-in		84	0.51
Total votes		16,500	100.00

Democratic primary results
Party	Candidate	Votes	%
Democratic	Rachel Armitage	12,090	85.22
Democratic	Jordan Guttierrez	1,156	8.15
Democratic	Aaron Dickie	725	5.11
Write-in		216	1.52
Total votes		14,187	100.00

Oregon's 16th Senate district results
Party	Candidate	Votes	%
Republican	Courtney Bangs		
Democratic	Rachel Armitage		
Write-in			
Total votes			100.00

=== District 17 ===
Incumbent Democrat Lisa Reynolds is running for re-election.

Democratic primary results
Party	Candidate	Votes	%
Democratic	Lisa Reynolds (incumbent)	14,240	86.33
Democratic	Autumn Sharp	2,205	13.37
Write-in		50	0.30
Total votes		16,495	100.00

Oregon's 17th Senate district results
Party	Candidate	Votes	%
Democratic	Lisa Reynolds (incumbent)		
Republican	John Chee		
Write-in			
Total votes			100.00

=== District 19 ===
Incumbent Democrat and Senate President Rob Wagner is running for re-election.

Oregon's 19th Senate district results
Party	Candidate	Votes	%
Democratic	Rob Wagner (incumbent)		
Republican	Mary Dirksen		
Write-in			
Total votes			100.00

=== District 20 ===
Incumbent Democrat Mark Meek is running for re-election.

Oregon's 20th Senate district results
Party	Candidate	Votes	%
Democratic	Mark Meek (incumbent)		
Republican	Michelle Stroh		
Write-in			
Total votes			100.00

=== District 24 ===
Incumbent Democrat Kayse Jama is running for re-election.

Oregon's 24th Senate district results
Party	Candidate	Votes	%
Democratic	Kayse Jama (incumbent)		
Republican	TBD		
Write-in			
Total votes			100.00

=== District 26 ===
Incumbent Republican Christine Drazan declined to seek re-election, instead running for governor of Oregon.

Democratic primary results
Party	Candidate	Votes	%
Democratic	Nicole Bassett	12,852	90.71
Democratic	Matthew Favro	1,156	8.16
Write-in		160	1.13
Total votes		14,168	100.00

Oregon's 26th Senate district results
Party	Candidate	Votes	%
Republican	Jeff Helfrich		
Democratic	Nicole Bassett		
Write-in			
Total votes			100.00

== See also ==
- 2026 Oregon House of Representatives election
