= 2020 Oregon Secretary of State election =

- November 3, 2020
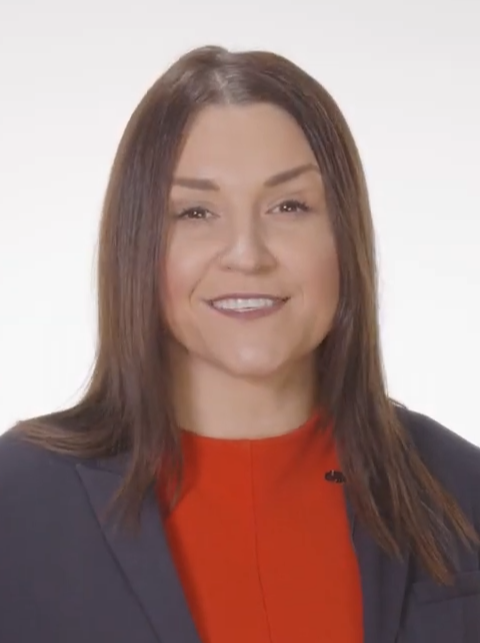

Nominee	Shemia Fagan	Kim Thatcher
Party	Democratic	Republican
Popular vote	1,146,370	984,587
Percentage	50.31%	43.21%
- Fagan: 40–50% 50–60% 60–70% 70–80% 80–90% >90% Thatcher: 40–50% 50–60% 60–70% 70–80% 80–90% >90% Tie: 40–50% 50% No data
Secretary of State before election
Bev Clarno
Republican
Elected Secretary of State
Shemia Fagan
Democratic

The 2020 Oregon Secretary of State election was held on November 3, 2020, to elect the Oregon Secretary of State, the highest office in the state after the governor. Incumbent Republican Bev Clarno had agreed not to run for a full term. Clarno was appointed by Governor Kate Brown to replace Dennis Richardson, who died of cancer during his term.

== Republican primary ==
=== Candidates ===
==== Declared ====
- Dave Stuaffer, environmental engineer, candidate for governor of Oregon in 2016 (as a Democrat) and in 2018 (as a Republican)
- Kim Thatcher, state senator for Oregon's 13th Senate district

==== Declined ====
- Rich Vial, former state representative for Oregon's 26th House district and former deputy Secretary of State

=== Endorsements ===
Kim Thatcher

Organizations

- NRA Political Victory Fund
- Oregon Business and Industry
- Oregon Firearms Federation
- Oregon National Federation of Independent Business

Newspapers

- The Bulletin

=== Results ===
Republican primary results
Party	Candidate	Votes	%
Republican	Kim Thatcher	312,296	85.62%
Republican	Dave Stauffer	48,839	13.39%
Write-in		3,625	0.99%
Total votes		364,760	100.0%

== Democratic primary ==
=== Candidates ===
==== Declared ====
- Shemia Fagan, state senator for Oregon's 24th Senate district
- Mark Hass, state senator for Oregon's 14th Senate district
- Jamie McLeod-Skinner, environmental attorney and nominee for Oregon's 2nd congressional district in 2018

==== Withdrawn ====
- Jamie Morrison (withdrew candidacy effective February 28, 2020, to run for District 18 in the Oregon House of Representatives)
- Cameron Smith, former Director of Oregon Department of Consumer and Business Services and Oregon Department of Veterans' Affairs (withdrew candidacy effective March 10, 2020)
- Jennifer Williamson, former Majority Leader of the Oregon House of Representatives and former state Representative for District 36 (withdrew candidacy effective February 26, 2020)
- Ryan Wruck, office manager (withdrew candidacy effective November 8, 2019, endorsed Mark Hass)

=== Endorsements ===
Shemia Fagan

Statewide officials

- Barbara Roberts, former Governor of Oregon

Unions

- American Federation of State, County and Municipal Employees
- American Federation of Teachers
- Oregon AFL–CIO
- Oregon Education Association
- Oregon School Employees Association
- Oregon State Building & Construction Trades Council
- Oregon State Firefighters Council
- Pacific Northwest Regional Council of Carpenters
- PCUN
- Service Employees International Union
- Sheet Metal and Air Conditioning Contractors' National Association
- United Association Local 290

Organizations

- NARAL Pro-Choice Oregon PAC
- Oregon League of Conservation Voters
- Planned Parenthood PAC of Oregon

Newspapers

- The Bulletin
Mark Hass

Statewide officials

- Bill Bradbury, former Oregon Secretary of State (served 1999–2009)
- Susan Castillo, former Oregon Superintendent of Public Instruction (served 2003–2012)
- Phil Keisling, former Oregon Secretary of State (served 1991–1999)

State legislators

- Ginny Burdick, state senator representing District 18, Majority Leader of the Oregon State Senate
- James Manning Jr., state senator representing District 7
- Caddy McKeown, state representative representing District 9
- Kathleen Taylor, state senator representing District 21
- Carolyn Tomei, former state representative representing District 41 (served 2001–2015)

Local officials

- Ben Bowman, Tigard-Tualatin school board member
- Anne Bryan, Beaverton school board member
- Deborah Kafoury, Multnomah County Commission chair
- LeeAnn Larsen, Beaverton school board member
- Maria Reyes, Tualatin city councilor
- Donna Tyner, Beaverton school board member
- Maureen Wolf, chair, Tigard-Tualatin School Board

Party officials

- Maria Smithson, former vice chair, Democratic Party of Oregon

Individuals

- Jennifer Mohr Colett, music teacher, Beaverton School District
- Nafisa Fai, Pan African Planning Group
- Sheila Hamilton, author and journalist
- Lupita Maurer, engineer, Latino rights advocate
- Megan McMillan, Oregon Emerge graduate
- Betty Reynolds, Clackamas Community College Board member
- Ryan Wruck, former 2020 candidate for Oregon Secretary of State

Newspapers

- Willamette Week
Jamie McLeod-Skinner

Statewide officials

- Jeanne Atkins, former Oregon Secretary of State (served 2015–2017)
- Marilynne Keyser, former deputy Oregon Secretary of State (served 1989–1991)

State legislators

- Jane Cease, former state senator representing District 10 (served 1985–1991), former state representative representing District 19 (served 1979–1985)
- Jackie Dingfelder, former state senator representing District 23 (served 2001–2009), former state representative representing District 19 and District 45 (served 2009–2013)
- Jeff Golden, state senator representing District 3
- Alissa Keny-Guyer, state representative representing District 46

State judicial officials

- Nancy Campbell Mead, retired circuit court judge, Washington County
- Pete Runnels, Harney County judge

Local officials

- Bill Baertlin, Tillamook County Commissioner
- Tammy Baney, former Deschutes County Commissioner
- Melissa Barnes-Dholakia, Bend-La Pine school board member
- Roy Barron, Hermiston city councilor
- Victor Chang, Ashland school board member
- Sumitra Chhetri, Centennial school board member
- Serena Cruz, former Multnomah County Commissioner
- Michelle DePass, Portland Public Schools Board of Education
- Carrie Douglas, co-chair, Bend-La Pine School Board
- Royce Embanks, Madras city councilor, former mayor
- Sarah Finger McDonald, vice chair, Corvallis School Board
- Dale Freeman, Pendleton school board member
- Gena Goodman-Campbell, Bend city councilor
- Claire Hall, Lincoln County Commissioner
- Roland Herrera, Keizer city councilor
- Ken Humberston, Clackamas County Commissioner
- John Hummel, Deschutes County District Attorney
- Nora Kent, Lane Education Service District Board member
- Chelsea King Martin, West Linn-Wilsonville school board member
- Darcy Long-Strickler, The Dalles city councilor
- Mary Middleton, vice chair, Southern Oregon ESD Board
- Carina Miller, former Tribal Council member, Confederated Tribes of Warm Springs
- Shimiko Montgomery, Bend-La Pine school board member
- Eddy Morales, Gresham city councilor
- Daniel Nguyen, Lake Oswego city councilor
- Denise Piza, former Madras city councilor
- Dawn Rasmussen, North Wasco County school board member
- Kathy Schwartz, Wasco County Commissioner
- Stefani Seffinger, Ashland city councilor
- Caroline Skidmore, Bend-La Pine school board member
- John Snider, mayor of Tigard
- Karen Starchvick, Medford school board member
- Leonard Stoehr, Springfield city councilor
- Darby Stricker, mayor of Talent
- Claire Syrett, Eugene city councilor
- Lucy Vinis, Mayor of Eugene
- Mary Walston, Eugene 4J school board member

Party officials

- Valdez Bravo, former vice chair, Democratic Party of Oregon
- Barbara Dudley, Senior Policy Advisor, Oregon Working Families Party
- James Freed, former vice chair, Multnomah County Democrats
- Linda Simmons, vice chair, Malheur Democratic Party

Organizations

- Josephine County Democratic Party
- LGBTQ Victory Fund
- The Vocal Seniority

Individuals

- Howard Arnett, attorney and University of Oregon law professor
- Dave Eyler, retired teacher, Malheur County
- Ryan Moore, candidate for Eugene city council
- Deb Porta, executive director, Pride Northwest
- Grant Starr, College Democrats of Oregon

=== Results ===
Results by county: Shemia Fagan: 45–50% 40–45% 35–40%; Mark Hass: 45–50% 40–45% 35–40%; Jamie McLeod-Skinner: 60–65% 55–60% 50–55% 45–50% 40–45% 35–40%

Democratic primary results
Party	Candidate	Votes	%
Democratic	Shemia Fagan	209,682	36.23%
Democratic	Mark Hass	205,230	35.46%
Democratic	Jamie McLeod-Skinner	159,430	27.55%
Write-in		4,395	0.76%
Total votes		578,737	100.0%

== General election ==
=== Debate ===
2020 Oregon Secretary of State debate
No.	Date	Host	Moderator	Link	Republican	Democratic	Pacific Green	Libertarian
Key: P Participant A Absent N Not invited I Invited W Withdrawn								
Key: P Participant A Absent N Not invited I Invited W Withdrawn					Kim Thatcher	Shemia Fagan	Nathalie Paravicini	Kyle Markley
1	October 1, 2020	City Club of Portland	John Schrag	YouTube	P	P	N	N

=== Predictions ===
Source	Ranking	As of
The Cook Political Report	Likely D (flip)	June 25, 2020

=== Endorsements ===
Shemai Fagan

Organizations

- Oregon League of Conservation Voters

Newspapers

- The Oregonian

=== Results ===
2020 Oregon Secretary of State election
Party	Candidate	Votes	%	±%
Democratic	Shemia Fagan	1,146,370	50.31%	+7.10%
Republican	Kim Thatcher	984,597	43.21%	–4.17%
Pacific Green	Nathalie Paravicini	82,211	3.61%	+1.09%
Libertarian	Kyle Markley	62,985	2.76%	+0.27%
Write-in		2,340	0.10%	–0.04%
Total votes		2,278,503	100.00%	N/A
Democratic gain from Republican				

==== By county ====
County	Kim Thatcher Republican		Shemia Fagan Democratic		Various candidates Other parties		Margin		Total
County	#	%	#	%	#	%	#	%	Total
Baker	7,210	74.59%	2,052	21.23%	404	4.18%	-5,158	-53.36%	9,666
Benton	16,889	33.09%	30,118	59.00%	4,040	7.91%	13,229	25.92%	51,047
Clackamas	114,869	46.69%	116,280	47.26%	14,893	6.05%	1,411	0.57%	246,042
Clatsop	10,358	44.54%	11,256	48.87%	1,519	6.59%	998	4.33%	23,033
Columbia	16,851	54.08%	12,207	39.18%	2,101	6.74%	-4,644	-14.90%	31,159
Coos	21,194	59.76%	12,287	34.64%	1,985	5.60%	-8,907	-25.11%	35,466
Crook	11,022	73.43%	3,368	22.44%	621	4.14%	-7,654	-50.99%	15,011
Curry	8,378	58.21%	5,309	36.89%	706	4.91%	-3,069	-21.32%	14,393
Deschutes	58,615	48.63%	54,834	45.49%	7,084	5.88%	-3,781	-3.14%	120,533
Douglas	42,476	68.29%	16,691	26.83%	3,033	4.88%	-25,785	-41.45%	62,200
Gilliam	812	70.98%	278	24.30%	54	4.72%	-534	-46.68%	1,144
Grant	3,452	77.23%	835	18.68%	183	4.09%	-2,617	-58.55%	4,470
Harney	3,366	77.77%	791	18.28%	171	3.95%	-2,575	-59.50%	4,328
Hood River	4,169	33.06%	7,622	60.45%	818	6.49%	3,453	27.39%	12,609
Jackson	64,447	52.82%	50,753	41.60%	6,803	5.58%	-13,694	-11.22%	122,003
Jefferson	7,079	60.94%	3,948	33.98%	590	5.08%	-3,131	-26.95%	11,617
Josephine	31,018	62.77%	15,647	31.66%	2,750	5.57%	-15,371	-31.11%	49,415
Klamath	24,805	69.85%	8,899	25.06%	1,806	5.09%	-15,906	-44.79%	35,510
Lake	3,401	80.38%	687	16.24%	143	3.38%	-2,714	-64.15%	4,231
Lane	82,695	39.00%	114,745	54.11%	14,616	6.89%	32,050	15.11%	212,056
Lincoln	12,513	42.09%	15,298	51.46%	1,916	6.45%	2,785	9.37%	29,727
Linn	42,852	61.42%	22,579	32.36%	4,336	6.21%	-20,273	-29.06%	69,767
Malheur	8,146	70.76%	2,817	24.47%	549	4.77%	-5,329	-46.29%	11,512
Marion	81,209	50.76%	69,121	43.20%	9,663	6.04%	-12,088	-7.56%	159,993
Morrow	3,487	70.32%	1,238	24.96%	234	4.72%	-2,249	-45.35%	4,959
Multnomah	88,961	20.06%	321,966	72.59%	32,631	7.36%	233,005	52.53%	443,558
Polk	24,641	52.50%	19,521	41.59%	2,770	5.90%	-5,120	-10.91%	46,932
Sherman	886	76.05%	238	20.43%	41	3.52%	-648	-55.62%	1,165
Tillamook	8,257	50.63%	7,168	43.96%	882	5.41%	-1,089	-6.68%	16,307
Umatilla	20,962	65.97%	9,172	28.87%	1,639	5.16%	-11,790	-37.11%	31,773
Union	10,044	69.70%	3,765	26.13%	602	4.18%	-6,279	-43.57%	14,411
Wallowa	3,457	68.78%	1,381	27.48%	188	3.74%	-2,076	-41.31%	5,026
Wasco	6,832	50.11%	5,958	43.70%	845	6.20%	-874	-6.41%	13,635
Washington	108,400	35.38%	174,928	57.09%	23,086	7.53%	66,528	21.71%	306,414
Wheeler	679	72.78%	210	22.51%	44	4.72%	-469	-50.27%	933
Yamhill	30,165	53.52%	22,403	39.75%	3,790	6.72%	-7,762	-13.77%	56,358
Totals	984,597	43.21%	1,146,370	50.31%	147,536	6.48%	161,773	7.10%	2,278,503

Counties that flipped from Republican to Democratic

- Clackamas (largest city: Lake Oswego)
- Clatsop (largest city: Astoria)

==== By congressional district ====
Despite losing the state, Thatcher won three of five congressional districts, including two that elected Democrats.

District	Thatcher	Fagan	Representative
1st	38%	55%	Suzanne Bonamici
2nd	58%	37%	Cliff Bentz
3rd	25%	68%	Earl Blumenauer
4th	49%	45%	Peter DeFazio
5th	47.1%	46.8%	Kurt Schrader

== See also ==
- Oregon Secretary of State
- 2020 Oregon state elections
