= 2020 Oregon elections =

- November 3, 2020

A general election was held in the U.S. state of Oregon on November 3, 2020. Primary elections were held on May 19, 2020.

== Federal ==
=== President of the United States ===
Former Democratic Vice President Joseph Biden beat incumbent Republican President Donald Trump, first elected in 2016, to receive Oregon's seven electoral votes.

=== United States Senate ===
Incumbent Democratic Senator Jeff Merkley, who was first elected in 2008 and re-elected in 2014, was re-elected to a third term in office.

=== United States House of Representatives ===
All five of Oregon's seats in the United States House of Representatives were up for re-election in 2020. These seats were currently represented by four Democrats and one Republican. In October 2019, incumbent Republican Representative Greg Walden of the 2nd district announced that he would not seek a twelfth term. All of the other incumbent Representatives won in their respective districts, and Republican Cliff Bentz won in the 2nd district.

== Attorney general ==
Incumbent Democratic attorney general Ellen Rosenblum was originally appointed to the role by former governor John Kitzhaber on June 29, 2012, to finish the term of her predecessor John Kroger, who resigned from office. She was elected to a full term in 2012 and re-elected in 2016. This office is not subject to term limits, and Rosenblum was reelected to a third full term.

=== Democratic primary ===
==== Declared candidates ====
- Ellen Rosenblum, incumbent attorney general

==== Results ====
Democratic primary results
Party	Candidate	Votes	%
Democratic	Ellen Rosenblum (incumbent)	472,708	98.96%
Democratic	Write-ins	4,948	1.04%
Total votes		477,656	100.00%

=== Republican primary ===
==== Declared candidates ====
- Michael Cross, professional driver and software designer, leader of an unsuccessful attempt to recall Governor Kate Brown in 2019

==== Withdrawn candidates ====
- Daniel Zene Crowe, lawyer and Republican nominee for attorney general in 2016 (withdrew candidacy effective March 13, 2020)

==== Results ====
Republican primary results
Party	Candidate	Votes	%
Republican	Michael Cross	274,387	96.67%
Republican	Write-ins	9,438	3.33%
Total votes		283,825	100.00%

=== General election ===
Attorney General of Oregon
Party	Candidate	Votes	%
Democratic	Ellen Rosenblum (incumbent)	1,264,716	55.97%
Republican	Michael Cross	934,357	41.35%
Libertarian	Lars D H Hedbor	52,087	2.30%
	Write-ins	8,600	0.38%
Total votes		2,259,760	100.00%

== Secretary of state ==
Incumbent Republican secretary of state Bev Clarno was originally appointed to the role by Governor Kate Brown on March 31, 2019, to finish the term of her predecessor, Dennis Richardson, who died in office. Brown announced that she was only interested in appointing a successor to Richardson who wanted the day-to-day responsibilities of the office and would not run for election to a full term, a condition to which Clarno agreed upon her appointment.

=== Republican primary ===
==== Declared candidates ====
- Dave Stuaffer, environmental engineer, candidate for Governor of Oregon in 2016 (as a Democrat) and in 2018 (as a Republican)
- Kim Thatcher, state Senator representing District 13

==== Declined ====
- Rich Vial, former state Representative for District 26, former deputy Secretary of State

==== Endorsements ====
Kim Thatcher

Newspapers

- The Bulletin

==== Results ====
Republican primary results
Party	Candidate	Votes	%
Republican	Kim Thatcher	306,126	85.65%
Republican	Dave Stauffer	47,705	13.35%
Republican	Write-ins	3,604	1.01%
Total votes		357,435	100.00%

=== Democratic primary ===
==== Declared candidates ====
- Shemia Fagan, state Senator representing District 24
- Mark Hass, state Senator representing District 14
- Jamie McLeod-Skinner, environmental attorney and Democratic nominee for the 2018 election for Oregon's 2nd congressional district

==== Withdrawn candidates ====
- Jamie Morrison (withdrew candidacy effective February 28, 2020 to run for District 18 in the Oregon House of Representatives)
- Cameron Smith, former director of Oregon Department of Consumer and Business Services and Oregon Department of Veterans' Affairs (withdrew candidacy effective March 10, 2020)
- Jennifer Williamson, former Majority Leader of the Oregon House of Representatives and former state Representative for District 36 (withdrew candidacy effective February 26, 2020)
- Ryan Wruck, office manager (withdrew candidacy effective November 8, 2019, endorsed Mark Hass)

==== Endorsements ====
Shemia Fagan

Statewide officials

- Barbara Roberts, former governor of Oregon

Unions

- American Federation of State, County and Municipal Employees
- American Federation of Teachers
- Oregon AFL–CIO
- Oregon Education Association
- Oregon School Employees Association
- Oregon State Building & Construction Trades Council
- Oregon State Firefighters Council
- Pacific Northwest Regional Council of Carpenters
- PCUN
- Service Employees International Union
- Sheet Metal and Air Conditioning Contractors' National Association

Organizations

- NARAL Pro-Choice Oregon PAC
- Oregon League of Conservation Voters
- Planned Parenthood PAC of Oregon

Newspapers

- The Bulletin
Mark Hass

Statewide officials

- Bill Bradbury, former Oregon Secretary of State (served 1999–2009)
- Susan Castillo, former Oregon Superintendent of Public Instruction (served 2003–2012)
- Phil Keisling, former Oregon Secretary of State (served 1991–1999)

State legislators

- Ginny Burdick, state senator representing District 18, Majority Leader of the Oregon State Senate
- James Manning Jr., state senator representing District 7
- Caddy McKeown, state representative representing District 9
- Kathleen Taylor, state senator representing District 21
- Carolyn Tomei, former state representative representing District 41 (served 2001–2015)

Local officials

- Ben Bowman, Tigard-Tualatin school board member
- Anne Bryan, Beaverton school board member
- Deborah Kafoury, Multnomah County Commission chair
- LeeAnn Larsen, Beaverton school board member
- Maria Reyes, Tualatin City councilor
- Donna Tyner, Beaverton school board member
- Maureen Wolf, chair, Tigard-Tualatin school board

Party officials

- Maria Smithson, former vice-chair, Democratic Party of Oregon

Individuals

- Jennifer Mohr Colett, music teacher, Beaverton School District
- Nafisa Fai, Pan African Planning Group
- Sheila Hamilton, author and journalist
- Lupita Maurer, engineer, Latino rights advocate
- Megan McMillan, Oregon Emerge graduate
- Betty Reynolds, Clackamas Community College board member
- Ryan Wruck, former 2020 candidate for Oregon secretary of state

Newspapers

- Willamette Week
Jamie McLeod-Skinner

Statewide officials

- Jeanne Atkins, former Oregon Secretary of State (served 2015–2017)
- Marilynne Keyser, former deputy Oregon Secretary of State (served 1989–1991)

State legislators

- Jane Cease, former state senator representing District 10 (served 1985–1991), former state Representative representing District 19 (served 1979–1985)
- Jackie Dingfelder, former state senator representing District 23 (served 2001–2009), former state Representative representing District 19 and District 45 (served 2009–2013)
- Jeff Golden, state senator representing District 3
- Alissa Keny-Guyer, state representative representing District 46

State judicial officials

- Nancy Campbell Mead, retired circuit court judge, Washington County
- Pete Runnels, Harney County judge

Local officials

- Bill Baertlin, Tillamook County commissioner
- Tammy Baney, former Deschutes County commissioner
- Melissa Barnes-Dholakia, Bend-La Pine school board member
- Roy Barron, Hermiston city councilor
- Victor Chang, Ashland school board member
- Sumitra Chhetri, Centennial school board member
- Serena Cruz, former Multnomah County commissioner
- Michelle DePass, Portland Public Schools Board of Education
- Carrie Douglas, co-chair, Bend-La Pine school board
- Royce Embanks, Madras city councilor, former mayor
- Sarah Finger McDonald, vice chair, Corvallis school board
- Dale Freeman, Pendleton school board member
- Gena Goodman-Campbell, Bend city councilor
- Claire Hall, Lincoln County commissioner
- Roland Herrera, Keizer city councilor
- Ken Humberston, Clackamas County commissioner
- John Hummel, Deschutes County district attorney
- Nora Kent, Lane Education Service District Board member
- Chelsea King Martin, West Linn-Wilsonville school board member
- Darcy Long-Strickler, The Dalles city councilor
- Mary Middleton, vice-chair, Southern Oregon ESD Board
- Carina Miller, former Tribal Council Member, Confederated Tribes of Warm Springs
- Shimiko Montgomery, Bend-La Pine school board member
- Eddy Morales, Gresham city councilor
- Daniel Nguyen, Lake Oswego city councilor
- Denise Piza, former Madras city councilor
- Dawn Rasmussen, North Wasco County school board member
- Kathy Schwartz, Wasco County commissioner
- Stefani Seffinger, Ashland city councilor
- Caroline Skidmore, Bend-La Pine school board member
- John Snider, Mayor of Tigard
- Karen Starchvick, Medford school board member
- Leonard Stoehr, Springfield city councilor
- Darby Stricker, Mayor of Talent
- Claire Syrett, Eugene city councilor
- Lucy Vinis, Mayor of Eugene
- Mary Walston, Eugene 4J school board member

Party officials

- Valdez Bravo, former vice chair, Democratic Party of Oregon
- Barbara Dudley, senior policy advisor, Oregon Working Families Party
- James Freed, former vice chair, Multnomah County Democrats
- Linda Simmons, vice chair, Malheur Democratic Party

Organizations

- Josephine County Democratic Party
- LGBTQ Victory Fund
- The Vocal Seniority

Individuals

- Howard Arnett, attorney and University of Oregon law professor
- Dave Eyler, retired teacher, Malheur County
- Ryan Moore, candidate for Eugene City Council
- Deb Porta, executive director, Pride Northwest
- Grant Starr, College Democrats of Oregon

==== Results ====
Democratic primary results
Party	Candidate	Votes	%
Democratic	Shemia Fagan	204,154	36.13%
Democratic	Mark Hass	200,942	35.57%
Democratic	Jamie McLeod-Skinner	155,326	27.49%
Democratic	Write-ins	4,554	0.81%
Total votes		564,976	100.00%

=== General election ===
Secretary of State of Oregon
Party	Candidate	Votes	%
Democratic	Shemia Fagan	1,146,370	50.31%
Republican	Kim Thatcher	984,597	43.21%
Green	Nathalie Paravicini	82,211	3.61%
Libertarian	Kyle Markley	62,985	2.76%
	Write-ins	2,362	0.10%
Total votes		2,278,525	100.00

== State treasurer ==
Incumbent Democratic state treasurer Tobias Read, first elected in 2016, was reelected to a second term in office.

=== Democratic primary ===
==== Declared candidates ====
- Tobias Read, incumbent state treasurer

==== Results ====
Democratic primary results
Party	Candidate	Votes	%
Democratic	Tobias Read (incumbent)	454,147	98.67%
Democratic	Write-ins	6,131	1.33%
Total votes		460,288	100.00%

=== Republican primary ===
==== Declared candidates ====
- Jeff Gudman, former Lake Oswego City Councilor

==== Results ====
Republican primary results
Party	Candidate	Votes	%
Republican	Jeff Gudman	299,512	98.88%
Republican	Write-ins	3,383	1.12%
Total votes		302,895	100.00%

=== General election ===
State Treasurer of Oregon
Party	Candidate	Votes	%
Democratic	Tobias Read	1,166,703	51.68%
Republican	Jeff Gudman	936,916	41.50%
Green	Chris Henry	99,870	4.42%
Constitution	Michael P Marsh	51,894	2.30%
	Write-ins	2,106	0.09%
Total votes		2,257,489	100.00%

== Legislative ==
In the previous legislative session, Democrats held a majority of 18–12 in the Senate and 38–22 in the House of Representatives. Of the 30 seats in the Senate, 16 were up for re-election. All 60 seats in the House of Representatives were up for re-election. After the election, Democrats held a majority 18–12 in the Senate and 37–23 in the House of Representatives.

== Ballot measures ==
There were four statewide Oregon ballot measures on the general election ballot. As a result of the election, all four measures passed.

=== Polling ===
Measure 109

Poll source	Date(s) administered	Sample size (Note: Key: A – all adults RV – registered voters LV – likely voters V – unclear)	Margin of error	For Measure 109	Against Measure 109	Undecided
DHM Research/Oregon Public Broadcasting/The Bulletin/Oregon Psylocobin Society (Note: The Oregon Psylocobin Society supported legalisation of psylocobin as laid out by Measure 109 prior to this poll's sampling period)	Released August 16, 2019 (Note: Conducted in winter of 2018)	600 (RV)	± 4.9%	47%	46%	7%

=== Results ===
Measure	Description	Votes	
Measure	Description	Yes	No
Measure 107	Amends Constitution: Allows laws limiting political campaign contributions and expenditures, requiring disclosure of political campaign contributions and expenditures, and requiring political campaign advertisements to identify who paid for them	1,763,276 (78.31%)	488,413 (21.69%)
Measure 108	Increases cigarette and cigar taxes. Establishes tax on e-cigarettes and nicotine vaping devices. Funds health programs.	1,535,866 (66.34%)	779,311 (33.66%)
Measure 109	Allows manufacture, delivery, administration of psilocybin at supervised, licensed facilities; imposes two-year development period	1,270,057 (55.75%)	1,008,199 (45.25%)
Measure 110	Provides statewide addiction/recovery services; marijuana taxes partially finance; reclassifies possession/penalties for specified drugs	1,333,268 (58.46%)	947,313 (41.54%)

== See also ==
- Elections in Oregon
- Portland, Oregon mayoral election, 2020
