= 2004 Oregon Senate election =

- November 2, 2004

17 out of 30 seats in the Oregon State Senate 16 seats needed for a majority
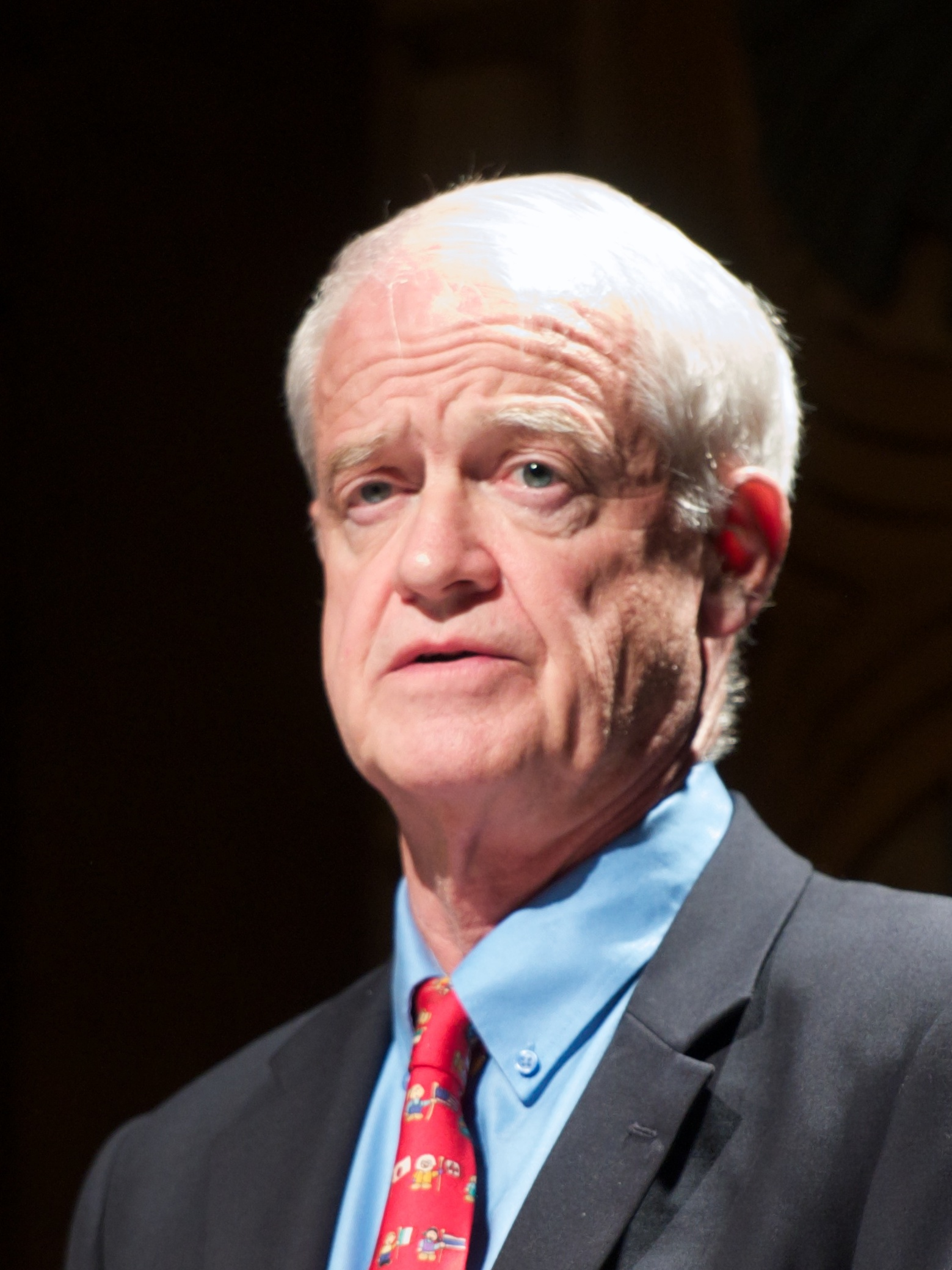

| | Majority party | Minority party |
|---|---|---|
| Leader | Peter Courtney | Ted Ferrioli |
| Party | Democratic | Republican |
| Leader since | January 3, 2003 | January 8, 2007 |
| Leader's seat | District 11 | District 30 |
| Last election | 15 | 15 |
| Seats after | 18 | 12 |
| Seat change | ▲3 | ▼3 |
| Popular vote | 403,687 | 466,431 |
| Percentage | 44.69% | 51.63% |
President of the Senate before election
Peter Courtney
Democratic
Elected President of the Senate
Peter Courtney
Democratic

The 2004 Oregon Senate election was held on November 2, 2004, to determine which party would control the Oregon State Senate for the following two years in the 73rd Oregon Legislative Assembly. Seventeen out of 30 seats in the Oregon State Senate were up for election and the primary was held on May 18, 2004. Prior to the election, 15 seats were held by Democrats and 15 seats were held by Republicans. The general election saw Democrats flipping 3 seats, thereby gaining a majority in the State Senate for the first time since 1994.

== Predictions ==
| Source | Ranking | As of |
|---|---|---|
| Rothenberg | Lean D (flip) | October 1, 2004 |

== Closest races ==
Seats where the margin of victory was under 10%:

1. District 5, 1.44% (gain)
2. District 3, 3.92% (gain)
3. District 25, 6.02% (gain)

== Results ==
=== District 1 ===
District 1 election, 2004
| Party | Candidate | Votes | % |
|---|---|---|---|
| Republican | Jeff Kruse | 38,866 | 66.03% |
| Democratic | Bruce W. Cronk | 19,992 | 33.97% |
| Total votes | | 58,858 | 100.0% |
| Republican hold | | | |

=== District 2 ===
District 2 election, 2004
| Party | Candidate | Votes | % |
|---|---|---|---|
| Republican | Jason Atkinson (incumbent) | 45,379 | 100.0% |
| Total votes | | 45,379 | 100.0% |
| Republican hold | | | |

=== District 3 ===
District 3 election, 2004
| Party | Candidate | Votes | % |
|---|---|---|---|
| Democratic | Alan Bates | 32,563 | 51.96% |
| Republican | Jim Wright | 30,101 | 48.04% |
| Total votes | | 62,664 | 100.0% |
| Democratic gain from Republican | | | |

=== District 4 ===
District 4 election, 2004
| Party | Candidate | Votes | % |
|---|---|---|---|
| Democratic | Floyd Prozanski | 38,211 | 62.55% |
| Republican | Norm Thomas | 23,871 | 38.45% |
| Total votes | | 62,082 | 100.0% |
| Democratic hold | | | |

=== District 5 ===
District 5 election, 2004
| Party | Candidate | Votes | % |
|---|---|---|---|
| Democratic | Joanne Verger | 30,460 | 50.72% |
| Republican | Al Pearn | 29,599 | 49.28% |
| Total votes | | 60,059 | 100.0% |
| Democratic gain from Republican | | | |

=== District 9 ===
District 9 election, 2004
| Party | Candidate | Votes | % |
|---|---|---|---|
| Republican | Roger Beyer (incumbent) | 38,891 | 83.60% |
| Constitution | Herman Joseph Baurer | 7,631 | 16.40% |
| Total votes | | 46,522 | 100.0% |
| Republican hold | | | |

=== District 12 ===
District 12 election, 2004
| Party | Candidate | Votes | % |
|---|---|---|---|
| Republican | Gary George (incumbent) | 32,662 | 58.98% |
| Democratic | Hank Franzoni | 22,711 | 41.02% |
| Total votes | | 55,373 | 100.0% |
| Republican hold | | | |

=== District 14 ===
District 14 election, 2004
| Party | Candidate | Votes | % |
|---|---|---|---|
| Democratic | Ryan Deckert (incumbent) | 34,644 | 64.03% |
| Republican | Jay Omdahl | 19,459 | 35.97% |
| Total votes | | 54,103 | 100.0% |
| Democratic hold | | | |

=== District 18 ===
District 18 election, 2004
| Party | Candidate | Votes | % |
|---|---|---|---|
| Democratic | Ginny Burdick (incumbent) | 37,540 | 61.40% |
| Republican | John Wight | 20,502 | 34.08% |
| Libertarian | Roger F. Garcia | 2,120 | 3.52% |
| Total votes | | 60,162 | 100.0% |
| Democratic hold | | | |

=== District 21 ===
District 21 election, 2004
| Party | Candidate | Votes | % |
|---|---|---|---|
| Democratic | Kate Brown (incumbent) | 52,278 | 87.18% |
| Libertarian | Theresa Reed | 4,563 | 7.61% |
| Constitution | Paul deParrie | 3,126 | 5.21% |
| Total votes | | 59,967 | 100.0% |
| Democratic hold | | | |

=== District 22 ===
District 22 election, 2004
| Party | Candidate | Votes | % |
|---|---|---|---|
| Democratic | Margaret Carter (incumbent) | 46,514 | 87.18% |
| Total votes | | 46,514 | 100.0% |
| Democratic hold | | | |

=== District 23 ===
District 23 election, 2004
| Party | Candidate | Votes | % |
|---|---|---|---|
| Democratic | Avel Gordly (incumbent) | 46,345 | 87.18% |
| Constitution | Lou Burbach | 5,894 | 5.21% |
| Total votes | | 52,239 | 100.0% |
| Democratic hold | | | |

=== District 25 ===
District 25 election, 2004
| Party | Candidate | Votes | % |
|---|---|---|---|
| Democratic | Laurie Monnes Anderson | 26,157 | 53.01% |
| Republican | Ron Sunseri | 23,182 | 46.99% |
| Total votes | | 49,339 | 100.0% |
| Democratic gain from Republican | | | |

=== District 27 ===
District 27 election, 2004
| Party | Candidate | Votes | % |
|---|---|---|---|
| Republican | Ben Westlund (incumbent) | 50,840 | 83.66% |
| Constitution | Don Loyd | 9,932 | 16.34% |
| Total votes | | 60,772 | 100.0% |
| Republican hold | | | |

=== District 28 ===
District 28 election, 2004
| Party | Candidate | Votes | % |
|---|---|---|---|
| Republican | Doug Whitsett | 38,292 | 70.18% |
| Democratic | Ross Carroll | 16,272 | 29.82% |
| Total votes | | 54,564 | 100.0% |
| Republican hold | | | |

=== District 29 ===
District 29 election, 2004
| Party | Candidate | Votes | % |
|---|---|---|---|
| Republican | David Nelson (incumbent) | 36,211 | 100.0% |
| Total votes | | 36,211 | 100.0% |
| Republican hold | | | |

=== District 30 ===
District 30 election, 2004
| Party | Candidate | Votes | % |
|---|---|---|---|
| Republican | Ted Ferrioli (incumbent) | 38,576 | 100.0% |
| Total votes | | 38,576 | 100.0% |
| Republican hold | | | |
