= Denise Krause =

American politician, professor

Member-elect of the Oregon Senate from the 3rd district
- Assuming office January 11, 2027
- Succeeding: Jeff Golden

Personal details
- Party: Democratic

Denise Krause is a former professor who was elected in November 2026 to the Oregon Senate from District 3. The district includes parts of Ashland and Medford, Oregon. Krause is a Democrat. She was a professor of population health in Mississippi. She defeated Republican candidate Brad Hicks. She succeeds Jeff Golden.

== See also ==
- 2026 Oregon State Senate election
