= Virginia Stapleton =

American politician

Member-elect of the Oregon Senate from the 11th district
- Assuming office January 2027
- Succeeding: Kim Thatcher

Personal details
- Born: Salem, Oregon, U.S.
- Party: Democratic

Virginia Stapleton is an Oregon Democratic politician. She was elected to serve in District 11 of the Oregon State Senate, representing parts of Marion county, including the cities of Woodburn, Gervais, Brooks, Keizer, and Salem.

== Early life and career ==
Stapleton was born and raised on her family's farm in Salem and has lived in the Salem and Keizer area her entire life. She has 11 siblings. She was elected to Salem City Council in 2020, serving until January 2025. Stapleton also served as the Council President during her time on Salem City Council.

== Political career ==
In the 2024 Oregon House of Representatives election, Stapleton declared her run for the Oregon State House in District 21, but was very narrowly defeated by longtime incumbent Republican lawmaker Kevin Mannix.

The next cycle, Stapleton declared her candidacy for the 2026 Oregon Senate election in the overlapping Oregon Senate District 11 and defeated former Oregon State Representative Tracy Cramer by more than 13 points.

== Electoral history ==
2024 Oregon State Representative, 21st district}}
Party	Candidate	Votes	%
Republican	Kevin Mannix	14,924	51.8
Democratic	Virginia Stapleton	13,822	48.0
Write-in		49	0.2
Total votes		28,795	100%

2026 Oregon State Senate, 11th district
Party	Candidate	Votes	%
Democratic	Virginia Stapleton		
Republican	Tracy Cramer	-	-
Write-in			
Total votes			100%
