= Jack Tibbetts =

American politician

Jack Tibbets

Member-elect of the Oregon Senate from the 6th district
- Assuming office 2027
- Succeeding: Cedric Hayden

Personal details
- Party: Republican
- Profession: politician, farmer, rancher

Jack Tibbets is an American politician who is a member-elect of the Oregon State Senate, representing the 6th district. He was elected in the general election on November 3, 2026.

== Personal life ==
Tibbets is from Santa Rosa, California, where he previously served on the city council. He and his wife, Ali, live in Cottage Grove with their two sons. He is a licensed pilot and owns a farm that sells wine grapes and Angus cattle.

== Career ==
Tibbets has worked as a farmer, rancher, welder, lifeguard, fisherman, and executive director of the Sonoma County branch of St. Vincent de Paul, a Catholic charity. He also currently serves on the Lane County Planning Advisory Commission.
