= 2022 Oregon State Senate election =

- November 8, 2022

16 of 30 seats in the Oregon State Senate 16 seats needed for a majority
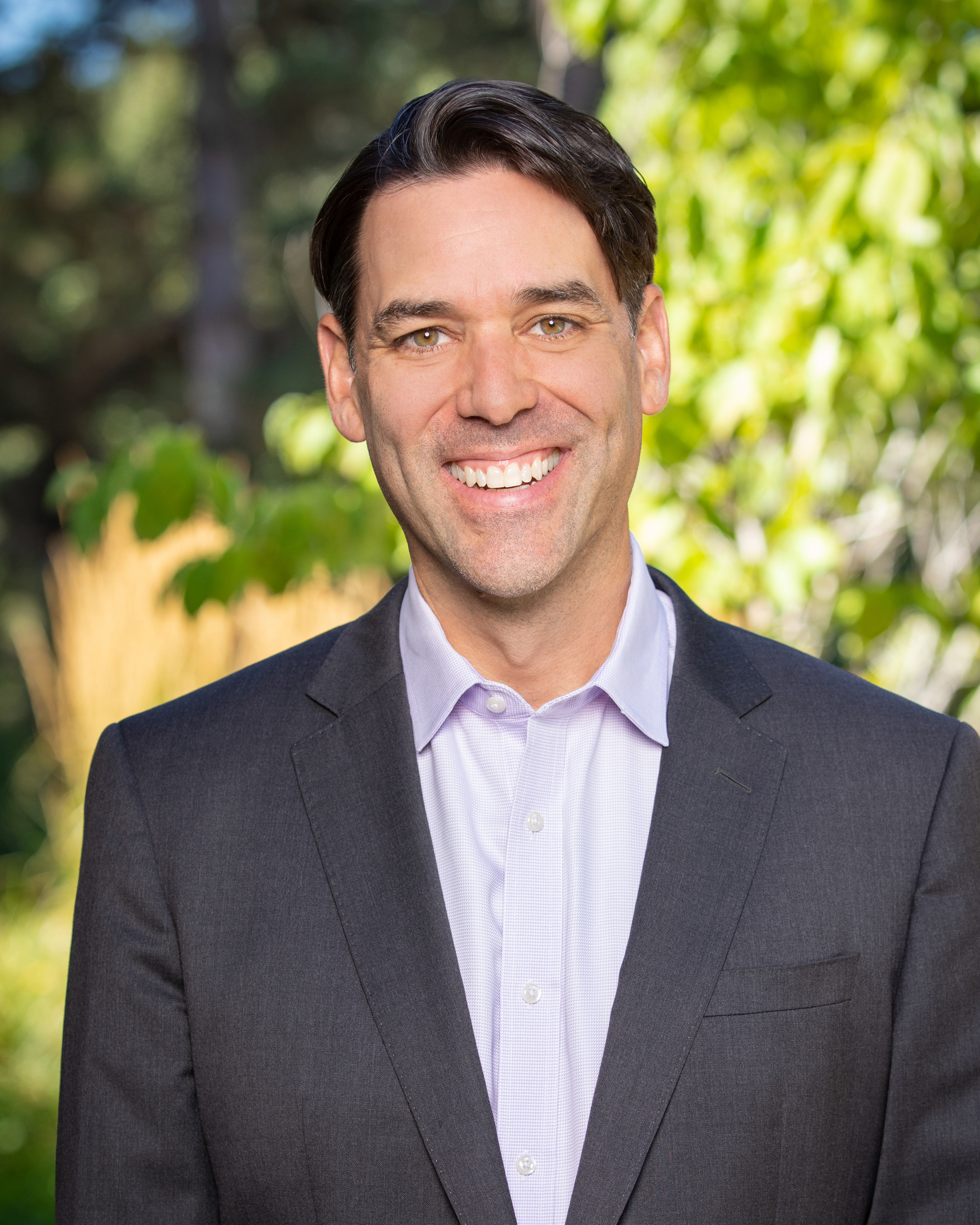

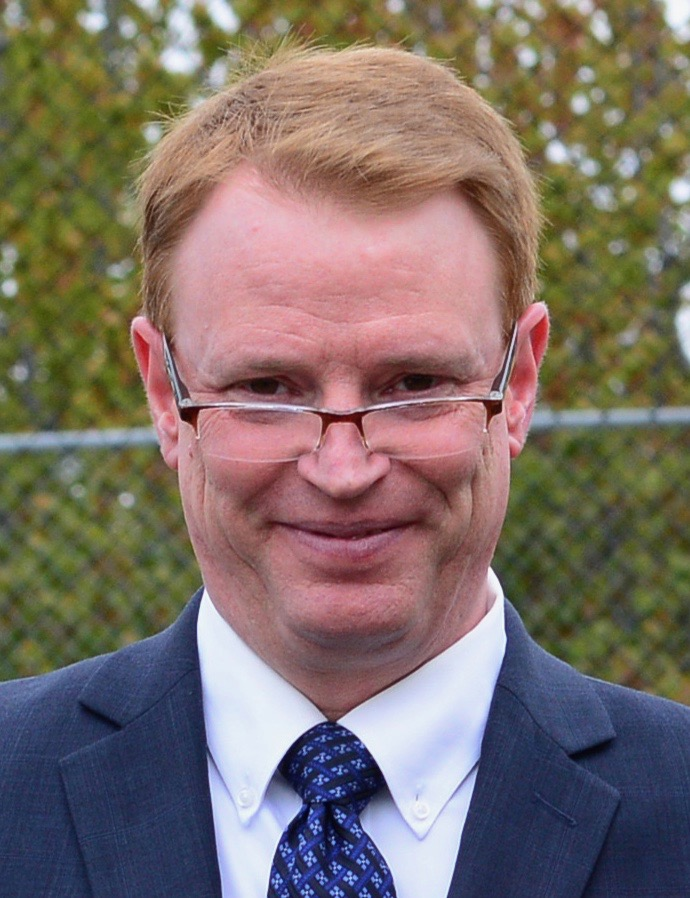

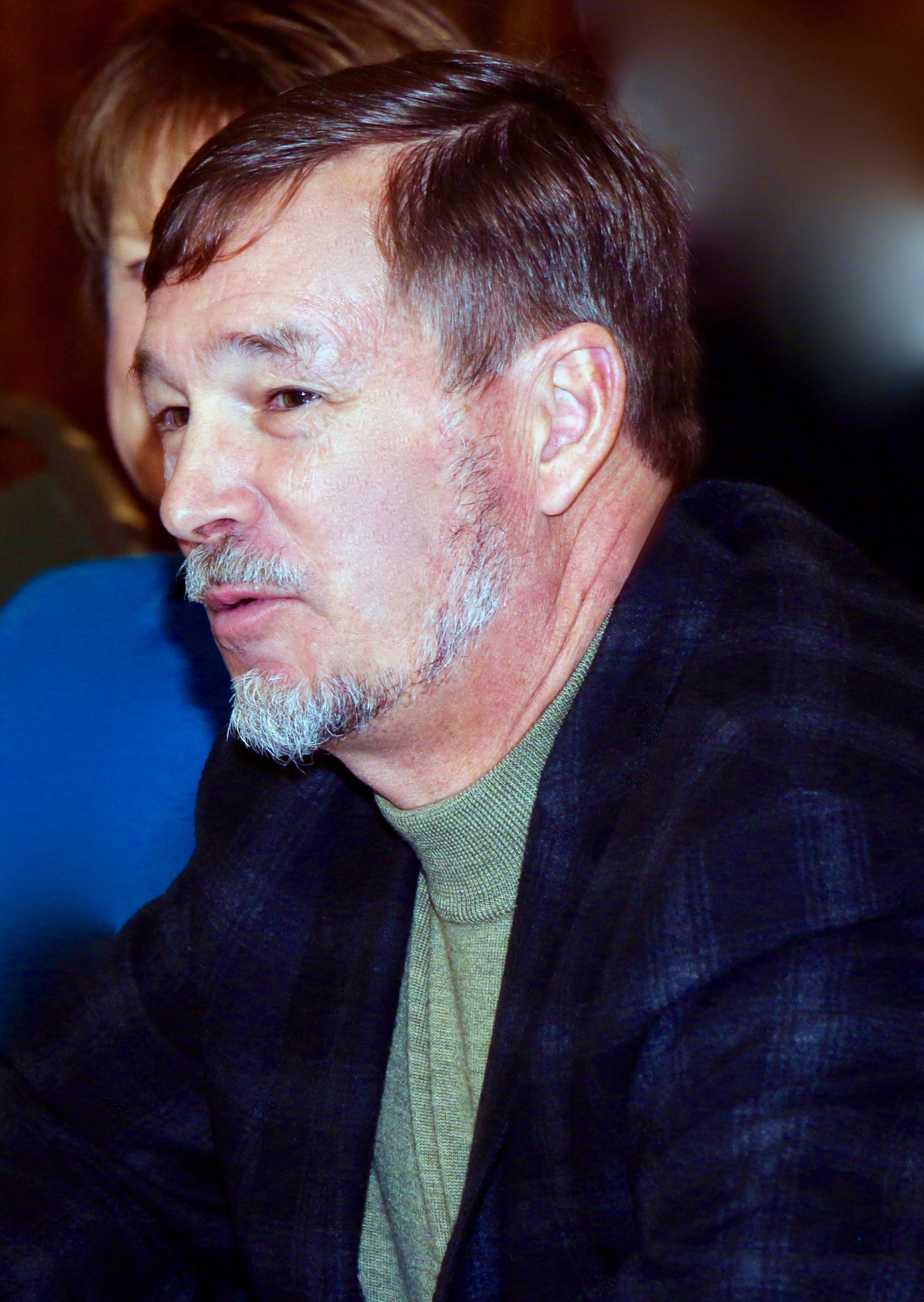
	Majority party	Minority party	Third party
Leader	Rob Wagner	Tim Knopp	Brian Boquist
Party	Democratic	Republican	Independent Party
Leader since	May 22, 2020	October 22, 2021	January 15, 2021
Leader's seat	District 19 (Lake Oswego)	District 27 (Bend)	District 12 (Dallas)
Last election	18 seats, 54.0%	12 seats, 44.4%	Did not participate
Seats before	18	11	1
Seats won	17	12	1
Seat change	▼1	▲1	Steady
Popular vote	541,049	410,990	5,599
Percentage	55.85%	42.43%	0.58%
Swing	▲1.84%	▼1.93%	New
- Democratic gain Republican gain Democratic hold Republican hold No election 50–60% 60–70% 70–80% 80–90% 50–60% 60–70%
President of the Senate before election
Peter Courtney
Democratic
Elected President of the Senate
Rob Wagner
Democratic

The 2022 Oregon State Senate election was held in the U.S. state of Oregon on November 8, 2022, to elect 15 of the 30 members of the State Senate of the 82nd Oregon Legislature, along with one special election.

A primary election was held in several districts on May 17, 2022. The election coincided with the election of the other house of the Legislative Assembly, the Oregon House of Representatives, and other elections.

== Background ==
The last election in 2020 resulted in the Democratic Party retaining a majority of seats, after winning a majority and ending a split State Senate sixteen years earlier in the 2004 election. All-Democratic control of the legislature (and a state trifecta) has persisted since 2012.

== Electoral system ==
The 15 members of the Senate up for election were elected from single-member districts via first-past-the-post voting for four-year terms.

Contested nominations of recognized major parties (Democratic and Republican) for each district were determined by a primary election on May 17, 2022.

Minor party candidates were nominated by petition. Write-in candidates must file a request with the Secretary of State's office for votes for them to be counted. Candidates for the state Senate in 2022 were required to file to run from September 10, 2021, to March 8, 2022.

== Predictions ==
Source	Ranking	As of
Sabato's Crystal Ball	Lean D	May 19, 2022

== Overview ==
Party	Candidates	Votes		Seats				
Party	Candidates	No.	%	Before	Up	Won	After	+/–
Democratic	15	541,049	55.85	18	13	12	17	▼1
Republican	15	410,990	42.43	11	3	4	12	▲1
Independent	1	5,599	0.58	1	0	0	1	Steady
Libertarian	1	9,295	0.96	0	0	0	0	Steady
Write-in	N/A	1,801	0.19	0	0	0	0	Steady
Total		968,734	100.00	30	16	16	30	

=== Summary by district ===
District	Incumbent	Party	Elected Senator	Party
3rd	Jeff Golden	Dem	Jeff Golden	Dem
4th	Floyd Prozanski	Dem	Floyd Prozanski	Dem
6th	Lee Beyer	Dem	Cedric Ross Hayden	Rep
7th	James Manning Jr.	Dem	James Manning Jr.	Dem
8th	Sara Gelser Blouin	Dem	Sara Gelser Blouin	Dem
10th	Deb Patterson	Dem	Deb Patterson	Dem
11th	Peter Courtney	Dem	Kim Thatcher	Rep
11th	Kim Thatcher (redistricted)	Rep	Kim Thatcher	Rep
13th	None		Aaron Woods	Dem
15th	Janeen Sollman	Dem	Janeen Sollman	Dem
16th	Rachel Armitage	Dem	Suzanne Weber	Rep
17th	Elizabeth Steiner Hayward	Dem	Elizabeth Steiner Hayward	Dem
18th (special)	Akasha Lawrence-Spence	Dem	Wlnsvey Campos	Dem
19th	Rob Wagner	Dem	Rob Wagner	Dem
20th	Bill Kennemer	Rep	Mark Meek	Dem
24th	Kayse Jama	Dem	Kayse Jama	Dem
26th	Chuck Thomsen	Rep	Daniel Bonham	Rep

== Close races ==
Districts where the margin of victory was under 10%:

1. District 20, 0.85%
2. District 3, 3.86%
3. District 11, 5.15%
4. District 10, 6.93%

== Detailed results ==
=== District 3 ===
2022 Senate District 3 Democratic Primary
Party	Candidate	Votes	%
Democratic	Jeff Golden (incumbent)	13,453	98.65%
Write-in		184	1.35%
Total votes		13,637	100.00%

2022 Senate District 3 Republican Primary
Party	Candidate	Votes	%
Republican	Randy Sparacino	8,876	73.73%
Republican	Kevin Christman	3,111	25.84%
Write-in		52	0.43%
Total votes		12,039	100.00%

2022 Senate District 3 General Election
Party	Candidate	Votes	%
Democratic	Jeff Golden (incumbent)	33,468	51.89
Republican	Randy Sparacino	30,980	48.03
Write-in		51	0.08
Total votes		64,499	100.00
Democratic hold			

=== District 4 ===
2022 Senate District 4 Democratic Primary
Party	Candidate	Votes	%
Democratic	Floyd Prozanski (incumbent)	14,876	98.91%
Write-in		164	1.09%
Total votes		15,040	100.00%

2022 Senate District 4 Republican Primary
Party	Candidate	Votes	%
Republican	Floyd Prozanski (incumbent) (Note: The candidate received write-in votes in this election.)	69	11.58%
Write-in		527	88.42%
Total votes		596	100.00%

2022 Senate District 4 General Election
Party	Candidate	Votes	%
Democratic	Floyd Prozanski (incumbent)	43,219	81.68
Libertarian	Eric Pinnell	9,295	17.57
Write-in		399	0.75
Total votes		52,913	100.00
Democratic hold			

=== District 6 ===
2022 Senate District 6 Democratic Primary
Party	Candidate	Votes	%
Democratic	Ashley Pelton	8,248	97.92%
Write-in		175	2.08%
Total votes		8,423	100.00%

2022 Senate District 6 Republican Primary
Party	Candidate	Votes	%
Republican	Cedric Ross Hayden	13,787	98.71%
Write-in		180	1.29%
Total votes		13,967	100.00%

2022 Senate District 6 General Election
Party	Candidate	Votes	%
Republican	Cedric Ross Hayden	45,104	65.22
Democratic	Ashley Pelton	23,926	34.60
Write-in		124	0.18
Total votes		69,154	100
Republican gain from Democratic			

=== District 7 ===
2022 Senate District 7 Democratic Primary
Party	Candidate	Votes	%
Democratic	James Manning Jr. (incumbent)	13,741	98.83%
Write-in		162	1.17%
Total votes		13,903	100.00%

2022 Senate District 7 Republican Primary
Party	Candidate	Votes	%
Republican	Raquel M. Ivie	5,583	95.80%
Write-in		245	4.20%
Total votes		5,828	100.00%

2022 Senate District 7 General Election
Party	Candidate	Votes	%
Democratic	James Manning Jr. (incumbent)	42,101	64.35
Republican	Raquel M. Ivie	23,077	35.27
Write-in		247	0.38
Total votes		65,425	100.00
Democratic hold			

=== District 8 ===
2022 Senate District 8 Democratic Primary
Party	Candidate	Votes	%
Democratic	Sara Gelser Blouin (incumbent)	15,329	98.82%
Write-in		183	1.18%
Total votes		15,512	100.00%

2022 Senate District 8 Republican Primary
Party	Candidate	Votes	%
Republican	Valerie Draper Woldeit	7,450	97.70%
Write-in		175	2.30%
Total votes		7,625	100.00%

2022 Senate District 8 General Election
Party	Candidate	Votes	%
Democratic	Sara Gelser Blouin (incumbent)	37,815	59.75
Republican	Valerie Draper Woldeit	25,375	40.10
Write-in		97	0.15
Total votes		63,287	100.00
Democratic hold			

=== District 10 ===
2022 Senate District 10 Democratic Primary
Party	Candidate	Votes	%
Democratic	Deb Patterson (incumbent)	13,006	98.87%
Write-in		148	1.13%
Total votes		13,154	100.00%

2022 Senate District 10 Republican Primary
Party	Candidate	Votes	%
Republican	Raquel Moore-Green	9,248	98.59%
Write-in		132	1.41%
Total votes		9,380	100.00%

2022 Senate District 10 General Election
Party	Candidate	Votes	%
Democratic	Deb Patterson (incumbent)	32,007	53.40
Republican	Raquel Moore-Green	27,853	46.47
Write-in		83	0.14
Total votes		59,943	100.00
Democratic hold			

=== District 11 ===
2022 Senate District 11 Democratic Primary
Party	Candidate	Votes	%
Democratic	Eric Swenson (Note: Despite winning the nomination, Eric Swenson withdrew and was replaced on the general election ballot by Rich Walsh.)	3,822	44.04%
Democratic	Richard "Rich" Walsh	2,964	34.16%
Democratic	Anthony J. Rosilez	1,789	20.62%
Write-in		103	1.19%
Total votes		8,678	100.00%

2022 Senate District 11 Republican Primary
Party	Candidate	Votes	%
Republican	Kim Thatcher (incumbent)	8,340	91.60%
Republican	Marcello De Cicco	652	7.16%
Write-in		113	1.24%
Total votes		9,105	100.00%

2022 Senate District 11 General Election
Party	Candidate	Votes	%
Republican	Kim Thatcher (incumbent)	22,238	52.45
Democratic	Richard "Rich" Walsh	20,054	47.30
Write-in		105	0.25
Total votes		42,397	100.00
Republican hold			

=== District 13 ===
2022 Senate District 13 Democratic Primary
Party	Candidate	Votes	%
Democratic	Aaron Woods	8,618	55.00%
Democratic	Chelsea King	6,963	44.44%
Write-in		88	0.56%
Total votes		15,669	100.00%

2022 Senate District 13 Republican Primary
Party	Candidate	Votes	%
Republican	John D. Velez	7,031	98.09%
Write-in		137	1.91%
Total votes		7,168	100.00%

2022 Senate District 13 General Election
Party	Candidate	Votes	%
Democratic	Aaron Woods	37,474	58.02
Republican	John D. Velez	27,045	41.87
Write-in		69	0.11
Total votes		64,588	100.00
Democratic win (new seat)			

=== District 15 ===
2022 Senate District 15 Democratic Primary
Party	Candidate	Votes	%
Democratic	Janeen Sollman (incumbent)	9,251	98.38%
Write-in		152	1.62%
Total votes		9,403	100.00%

2022 Senate District 15 Republican Primary
Party	Candidate	Votes	%
Republican	Carolina Malmedal	5,595	97.92%
Write-in		119	2.08%
Total votes		5,714	100.00%

2022 Senate District 15 General Election
Party	Candidate	Votes	%
Democratic	Janeen Sollman (incumbent)	28,225	55.47
Republican	Carolina Malmedal	22,566	44.35
Write-in		88	0.17
Total votes		50,879	100.00
Democratic hold			

=== District 16 ===
2022 Senate District 16 Democratic Primary
Party	Candidate	Votes	%
Democratic	Melissa Busch	12,496	97.82%
Write-in		279	2.18%
Total votes		12,775	100.00%

2022 Senate District 16 Republican Primary
Party	Candidate	Votes	%
Republican	Suzanne Weber	11,744	98.52%
Write-in		176	1.48%
Total votes		11,920	100.00%

2022 Senate District 16 General Election
Party	Candidate	Votes	%
Republican	Suzanne Weber	41,144	56.51
Democratic	Melissa Busch	31,585	43.38
Write-in		74	0.10
Total votes		72,803	100.00
Republican gain from Democratic			

=== District 17 ===
2022 Senate District 17 Democratic Primary
Party	Candidate	Votes	%
Democratic	Elizabeth Steiner Hayward (incumbent)	15,132	99.38%
Write-in		95	0.62%
Total votes		15,227	100.00%

2022 Senate District 17 Republican Primary
Party	Candidate	Votes	%
Republican	John Verbeek	3,288	98.35%
Write-in		55	1.65%
Total votes		3,343	100.00%

2022 Senate District 17 General Election
Party	Candidate	Votes	%
Democratic	Elizabeth Steiner Hayward (incumbent)	46,647	78.92
Republican	John Verbeek	12,377	20.94
Write-in		86	0.15
Total votes		59,110	100.00
Democratic hold			

=== District 18 ===
Special Election (2-year term)

2022 Senate District 18 Special Democratic Primary
Party	Candidate	Votes	%
Democratic	Wlnsvey Campos	10,272	84.63%
Democratic	Alisa Blum	1,791	14.76%
Write-in		75	0.62%
Total votes		12,138	100.00%

2022 Senate District 18 Special Republican Primary
Party	Candidate	Votes	%
Republican	Kimberly Rice	4,983	97.97%
Write-in		103	2.03%
Total votes		5,086	100.00%

2022 Senate District 18 Special General Election
Party	Candidate	Votes	%
Democratic	Wlnsvey Campos	30,534	56.50
Republican	Kimberly Rice	17,848	33.03
Nonpartisan	Rich Vial (Note: The candidate was listed in Oregon official election results as "(NAV) Nonaffiliated" party.)	5,599	10.36
Write-in		59	0.11
Total votes		54,040	100.00
Democratic hold			

=== District 19 ===
2022 Senate District 19 Democratic Primary
Party	Candidate	Votes	%
Democratic	Rob Wagner (incumbent)	17,883	99.25%
Write-in		135	0.75%
Total votes		18,018	100.00%

2022 Senate District 19 Republican Primary
Party	Candidate	Votes	%
Republican	Ben Edtl	6,164	67.26%
Republican	Wendy O'Riley	2,929	31.96%
Write-in		71	0.77%
Total votes		9,164	100.00%

2022 Senate District 19 General Election
Party	Candidate	Votes	%
Democratic	Rob Wagner (incumbent)	48,309	66.03
Republican	Ben Edtl	24,767	33.85
Write-in		85	0.12
Total votes		73,161	100.00
Democratic hold			

=== District 20 ===
2022 Senate District 20 Democratic Primary
Party	Candidate	Votes	%
Democratic	Mark Meek	11,334	98.83%
Write-in		134	1.17%
Total votes		11,468	100.00%

2022 Senate District 20 Republican Primary
Party	Candidate	Votes	%
Republican	Bill Kennemer (incumbent)	8,069	85.06%
Republican	Christopher J. Morrisette	847	8.93%
Republican	Tim M. Large	502	5.29%
Write-in		68	0.72%
Total votes		9,486	100.00%

2022 Senate District 20 General Election
Party	Candidate	Votes	%
Democratic	Mark Meek	31,317	50.33
Republican	Bill Kennemer (incumbent)	30,814	49.52
Write-in		94	0.15
Total votes		62,225	100.00
Democratic gain from Republican			

=== District 24 ===
2022 Senate District 24 Democratic Primary
Party	Candidate	Votes	%
Democratic	Kayse Jama (incumbent)	8,885	99.13%
Write-in		78	0.87%
Total votes		8,963	100.00%

2022 Senate District 24 Republican Primary
Party	Candidate	Votes	%
Republican	Stan Catherman	3,651	97.59%
Write-in		90	2.41%
Total votes		3,741	100.00%

2022 Senate District 24 General Election
Party	Candidate	Votes	%
Democratic	Kayse Jama (incumbent)	27,021	58.72
Republican	Stan Catherman	18,948	41.17
Write-in		50	0.11
Total votes		46,019	100.00
Democratic hold			

=== District 26 ===
2022 Senate District 26 Democratic Primary
Party	Candidate	Votes	%
Democratic	Raz Mason	10,296	97.71%
Write-in		241	2.29%
Total votes		10,537	100.00%

2022 Senate District 26 Republican Primary
Party	Candidate	Votes	%
Republican	Daniel G. Bonham	10,999	69.76%
Republican	Steve Bates	3,213	20.38%
Republican	Michael J. Nugent	1,500	9.51%
Write-in		55	0.35%
Total votes		15,767	100.00%

2022 Senate District 26 General Election
Party	Candidate	Votes	%
Republican	Daniel G. Bonham	40,351	59.09
Democratic	Raz Mason	27,850	40.78
Write-in		90	0.13
Total votes		68,291	100.00
Republican hold			
