= Vic Backlund =

American politician and coach

Member of the Oregon House of Representatives from the 25th district
- In office January 11, 1999 – August 5, 2005
- Preceded by: Peter Courtney
- Succeeded by: Kim Thatcher

Personal details
- Born: September 12, 1936 (age 90) Coquille, Oregon
- Party: Republican

Victor Lee Backlund (born September 12, 1936) is an American politician who served as a member of the Oregon House of Representatives representing Keizer for three terms.

== Athletic career ==
Backlund grew up in Bandon, Oregon, attending Bandon Senior High School where he played baseball, football, and basketball, lettering 11 times. He graduated as Valedictorian in 1954. He attended college at Willamette University where he continued to play three sports and lettered 10 times. He went on to play minor league baseball. In 1960, Backlund enlisted in the U.S. Army reserves and retired from baseball. He started coaching JV football and JV baseball in 1961 at North Salem High School. He transitioned to McNary High School in 1965 upon its opening as a social studies teacher and football coach. He led the baseball team to 14 state playoffs and is regarded as McNary's best ever coach and one of the best High School coaches in Oregon. He was The Oregonian's 1989 Coach of the Year.

== Political career ==
Backlund is described as a moderate Republican. He was the last Republican elected to the 33rd district, when in 2000 he ran unopposed to represent the Keizer district. Backlund was associated with the Council of State Governments in 2003. Backlund won the 1982 Keizer first citizen award. Backlund decided not to run for a fourth term in 2006, saying he wished to travel.

== Personal life ==
Backlund married his wife Karen Enberg (1938–2024), who he met in college, in 1959. He has two children with her, Valerie and Brett. He is a Presbyterian.
