= Lee Beyer =

American politician (born 1948)

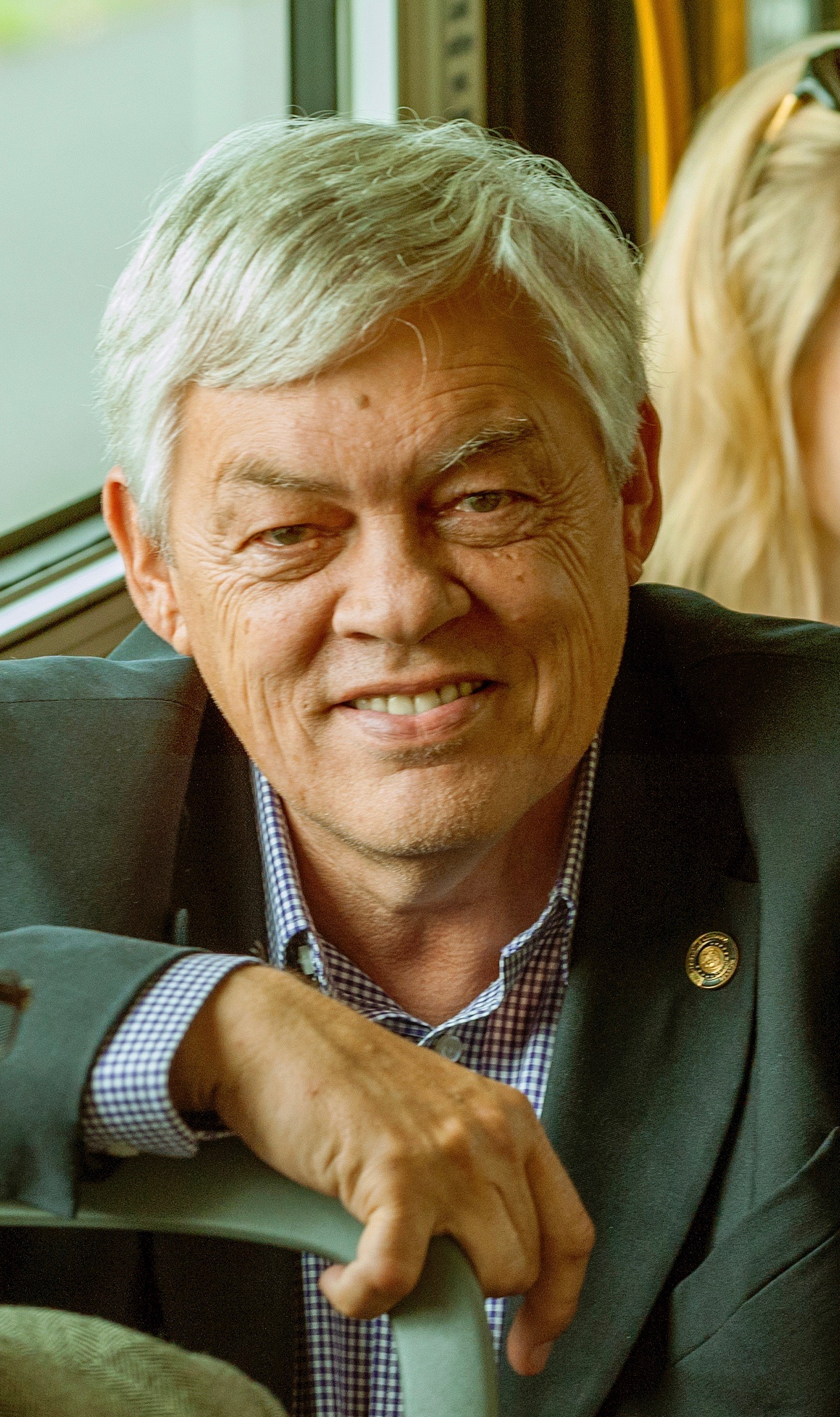

Member of the Oregon Senate from the 6th district
- In office 2011–2023
- Preceded by: Bill Morrisette
- Succeeded by: Cedric Ross Hayden

Member of the Oregon Senate from the 21st district
- In office 1999–2001
- Preceded by: Bill Dwyer
- Succeeded by: Bill Morrisette

Member of the Oregon House of Representatives from the 42nd district
- In office 1991–1999
- Preceded by: Bill Dwyer
- Succeeded by: Bill Morrisette

Personal details
- Born: June 4, 1948 (age 78) Norfolk, Nebraska
- Party: Democratic
- Spouse: Terry Beyer

Leslee Beyer (born June 4, 1948) is an American Democratic politician from the U.S. state of Oregon. He served in both houses of the Oregon Legislative Assembly for a decade, representing Springfield, until being appointed to the Oregon Public Utility Commission in 2001 by then-governor John Kitzhaber.

== Early life ==
Lee Beyer was born on June 4, 1948, in Norfolk, Nebraska. Beyer received his education at the following institutions:

- BS, Management, University of Oregon, 1974
- Attended, Lane Community College

== Personal life ==
Lee Beyer is married to Terry and together they have three children named Jon, Josh, and Megan. He is a Lutheran.

== Career ==
In the 2010 legislative elections, Beyer was re-elected to his former seat in the Oregon State Senate, to succeed retiring senator Bill Morrisette. Lee's wife Terry Beyer, also a Democrat, serves in the Oregon House of Representatives.

Beyer has had the following political experience:

- Senator, Oregon State Senate, 2010–present
- Springfield City Councilor, 1986–1993;
- Representative, Oregon State House of Representatives, District 42, 1991–1998;
- House Democratic Whip

Beyer has been a member of the following committees:

- Member, Springfield City Planning Commission, 1978
- Chief Executive Officer, Oregon Public Utility Commission
- Member, Council of Utility Commissioners
- Member, Juvenile Crime Prevention Commission
- Member, Juvenile Task Force Subcommittee on Teen Runaways
- Member, Oregon Energy Planning Commission
- Member, Oregon Global Warming Commission
- Member, Oregon Public Utility Commission
- Member, Oregon Progress Board Benchmark Evaluation Task Force

== Electoral history ==
2010 Oregon State Senator, 6th district
| Party | Candidate | Votes | % |
|---|---|---|---|
| Democratic | Lee Beyer | 23,705 | 51.8 |
| Republican | Michael P Spasaro | 19,626 | 42.9 |
| Independent | Scott Reynolds | 2,304 | 5.0 |
| Write-in | | 93 | 0.2 |
| Total votes | | 45,728 | 100% |

2014 Oregon State Senator, 6th district
| Party | Candidate | Votes | % |
|---|---|---|---|
| Democratic | Lee Beyer | 26,080 | 58.9 |
| Republican | Michael P Spasaro | 17,999 | 40.7 |
| Write-in | | 165 | 0.4 |
| Total votes | | 44,244 | 100% |

2018 Oregon State Senator, 6th district
| Party | Candidate | Votes | % |
|---|---|---|---|
| Democratic | Lee L Beyer | 32,925 | 59.1 |
| Republican | Robert Schwartz | 22,671 | 40.7 |
| Write-in | | 121 | 0.2 |
| Total votes | | 55,717 | 100% |
