= Cedric Ross Hayden =

American politician

Cedric Hayden

Member of the Oregon Senate from the 6th district
- Incumbent
- Assumed office January 9, 2023
- Preceded by: Lee Beyer
- Succeeded by: Jack Tibbetts (elect)

Member of the Oregon House of Representatives from the 7th district
- In office January 12, 2015 – January 9, 2023
- Preceded by: Bruce Hanna
- Succeeded by: John Lively

Personal details
- Party: Republican
- Profession: politician, dentist, rancher, business owner
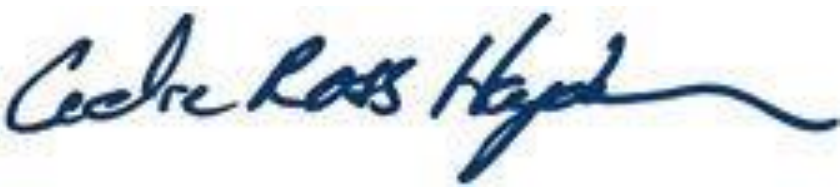
- Signature

Cedric Ross Hayden is an American politician from Oregon. He has served in the Oregon State Senate since 2023, representing the 6th district, which covers most of Linn County, eastern Lane County, and part of southern Marion County. He previously served in the Oregon House of Representatives, representing the 7th district from 2015 to 2023. His father, Cedric Lee Hayden, is a former state representative.

Hayden is a dentist, rancher, and business owner. He and his brother, also a dentist, run Caring Hands Worldwide, a charity that provides free dental care through mobile clinics, including a converted shipping container used in the Pacific Northwest and abroad. He is a Seventh-day Adventist and occasionally preaches at his church.

== Career ==
Hayden was first elected to the Oregon House of Representatives in 2014, succeeding Bruce Hanna. In the House, he served on the Republican leadership team as an assistant leader in 2019 and 2021, and was the Republican vice-chair of the House health care committee. In 2018, he sought the position of House Republican but lost to Carl Wilson.

In the Senate, he has been one of the Republican caucus's deputy leaders since 2024.

Hayden's legislative work has focused on health care access, particularly dental care. In 2015, he sponsored House Bill 3139, which prohibits local governments from preventing a nonprofit mobile medical clinic from operating on private property for up to 180 days. He introduced it after his charity's attempts to open a mobile dental clinic were blocked by zoning variance denials in Oakridge and Springfield. In 2021, he was among the Legislature's two dentist members who opposed a bill creating licensed dental therapists, voting for it in committee but against it both times on the House floor. In 2025, he was chief sponsor of Senate Bill 945, which established Oregon Health Plan eligibility for individuals under 26 who aged out of foster care in oregon or another state and directed it to the Oregon Health Authority to seek federal matching funds.

=== 2023 Senate Walkout ===
In May 2023, Hayden took part in a Republican walkout in the Oregon Senate that denied the chamber quorum for about six weeks.

Measure 113, a constitutional amendment approved by Oregon voters in 2022, disqualifies legislators with 10 or more unexcused absences in a session from holding offices in the following term. During the walkout, Hayden was one of 10 senators who exceeded that threshold. In August 2023, Secretary of State LaVonne Griffin-Valade directed that disqualified legislators could not file to run in the next election. Republican senators challenged that interpretation, arguing the penalty should apply a term later, and the Oregon Supreme Court rejected the challenge on February 1, 2024. Because Hayden's term ends in January 2027, he was ineligible to run in the 2026 election.

On May 8, 2023, the sixth day of the walkout, Hayden filed complaints with the Oregon Bureau of Labor and Industries and the Senate's Legislative Equity Office alleging that Senate President Rob Wagner had violated religious accommodation laws by denying his requests to be excused from Saturday sessions. Hayden, a Seventh-Day Adventist whose church worships on Saturdays, said other absences had been excused and that the denials could jeopardize his service because 10 unexcused absences would disqualify him from reelection under Measure 113.

In October 2023, the Senate Conduct Committee, made up of two Republicans and two Democrats, unanimously found the evidence insufficient to show that Wagner had created a hostile work environment for Hayden. An independent investigator had concluded that the evidence did not support a finding of hostile work environment or religious discrimination. Hayden did not attend the hearing, and his attorney disputed the findings in a letter to the committee.

Republican Jack Tibbetts won the open seat in the November 2026 election.

== Electoral history ==
2014 Oregon State Representative, 7th district
Party	Candidate	Votes	%
Republican	Cedric Hayden	16,725	79.7
Libertarian	Brandon M Boertje	3,727	17.8
Write-in		534	2.5
Total votes		20,986	100%

2016 Oregon State Representative, 7th district
Party	Candidate	Votes	%
Republican	Cedric Hayden	19,629	65.3
Democratic	Vincent T Portulano	7,148	23.8
Independent	Fergus Mclean	3,185	10.6
Write-in		76	0.3
Total votes		30,038	100%

2018 Oregon State Representative, 7th district
Party	Candidate	Votes	%
Republican	Cedric Hayden	17,886	60.8
Democratic	Christy Inskip	11,434	38.9
Write-in		83	0.3
Total votes		29,403	100%

2020 Oregon State Representative, 7th district
Party	Candidate	Votes	%
Republican	Cedric Hayden	25,076	67.8
Democratic	Jerry M Samaniego	11,861	32.1
Write-in		69	0.2
Total votes		37,006	100%

2022 Oregon State Senator, 6th district
Party	Candidate	Votes	%
Republican	Cedric R Hayden	45,104	65.2
Democratic	Ashley Pelton	23,926	34.6
Write-in		124	0.2
Total votes		69,154	100%
