= Kayse Jama =

American politician (born 1973/1974)

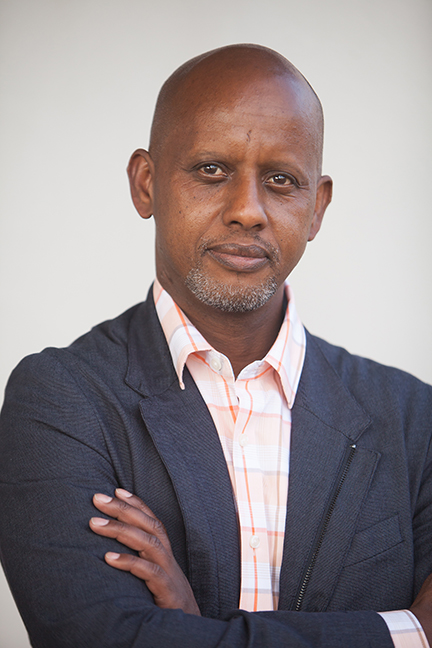

Majority Leader of the Oregon Senate
- Incumbent
- Assumed office November 16, 2024
- Preceded by: Kathleen Taylor

Member of the Oregon Senate from the 24th district
- Incumbent
- Assumed office January 6, 2021
- Preceded by: Shemia Fagan

Personal details
- Born: 1973 or 1974 (age 52–53) Somalia
- Party: Democratic
- Spouse: Stephanie Stephens
- Children: 2
- Education: Marylhurst University (BA)
- Website: State Senate website

Kayse Jama (born 1973/1974) is an American politician currently serving as Majority Leader of the Oregon State Senate. A Democratic member of the Oregon State Senate, he represents Oregon's 24th Senate district, which includes parts of East Portland, Damascus, and Boring. Jama was appointed by the Clackamas and Multnomah County Board of Commissioners to replace Shemia Fagan, who was elected Oregon Secretary of State in 2021.

== Early life and education ==
Jama was born into a nomadic family in Somalia. At eight years old, he moved to the capital, Mogadishu, to begin his education. Jama graduated from high school just as the civil war erupted, and he lived as a refugee for several years before arriving in San Diego in 1998. He settled in Portland, Oregon, shortly thereafter. He staffed the front desk at the Portland DoubleTree Hotel and helped other newly arrived refugees adapt to life in the United States as a case manager at Lutheran Community Services Northwest, eventually receiving a bachelor's degree in sociology from Marylhurst University.

== Career ==
In 2021, Jama stepped down as Executive Director of Unite Oregon after being appointed to the Oregon State Senate. He replaced State Senator Shemia Fagan, who was elected to serve as Oregon Secretary of State. Jama represents Senate District 24 which comprises East Portland, Damascus, and Boring. He is the first Muslim and the first former refugee to serve in the Oregon State Senate.

From 2005 to 2007, he trained immigrant and refugee community leaders in five Western states — Oregon, Washington, Nevada, Utah and Idaho — under a New Voices Fellowship at the Western States Center.

=== Unite Oregon ===
In 2002, Jama co-founded the Center for Intercultural Organizing, now Unite Oregon, after witnessing racial incidents in Portland following the September 11 attacks in 2001. Jama served as the director of the statewide nonprofit organization until 2021.

While at Unite Oregon, he led community organizing and ballot measure campaigns to reduce the influence of money in politics, end police profiling, reform Oregon's hate crime laws, and expand drug treatment. Jama was an advocate for the passage of Oregon ballot measure 110 which sought to decriminalize the use of drugs such as heroin.

=== Oregon State Senate ===
In 2018, Jama ran unsuccessfully in the Democratic primary for Senate District 24, finishing behind Shemia Fagan.

In January 2021, the Multnomah and Clackamas county commissioners voted unanimously to appoint Jama to the Senate to fill the remainder of Fagan's term after she was elected Secretary of State. In 2022, he was elected to a full four-year term, defeating Republican Sean Catherman in the general election.

Jama chaired the Senate Housing and Development Committee in his first term. In February 2024, the Senate passed a housing and homelessness package that Jama, as chair, said would provide relief to some people experiencing homelessness.

In November 2024, the Senate Democratic caucus elected Jama majority leader, replacing Kathleen Taylor. In October 2026, he announced he would not seek another term as majority leader.

== Awards ==
Jama has been awarded the Skidmore Prize for outstanding young nonprofit professionals (2007), the Oregon Immigrant Achievement Award from Oregon chapter of the American Immigration Lawyers Association (2008), the Lowenstein Trust Award, presented yearly to “that person who demonstrated the greatest contribution to assisting the poor and underprivileged in Portland" (2009), the Portland Peace Prize (2012), the Rankin Award in recognition of "lifelong activism and extraordinary service" (2016), the Northwest Workers’ Justice Project's Tribune of Worker Justice Award "celebrating his dedication to uplifting the lives of Oregon immigrant and low-wage workers" (2017), and a Rockwood Leadership Institute's Strengthening Democracy Fellowship (2019).

== Personal life ==
In 2004, Jama married Stephanie D. Stephens, who serves on the David Douglas School Board in Portland, Oregon. Jama and Stephens have two children.

== Electoral history ==
2022 Oregon State Senator, 24th district
| Party | Candidate | Votes | % |
|---|---|---|---|
| Democratic | Kayse Jama | 27,021 | 58.7 |
| Republican | Stan Catherman | 18,948 | 41.2 |
| Write-in | | 50 | 0.1 |
| Total votes | | 46,019 | 100% |

Oregon Senate
| Preceded by Kathleen Taylor | Majority Leader of the Oregon Senate; 2024–present | Incumbent |
