= Oregon's 19th Senate district =

American legislative district

Oregon's 19th Senate District as of September 27, 2021

District 19 of the Oregon State Senate comprises northwestern Clackamas, southwestern Multnomah, and southeastern Washington counties and includes Lake Oswego, Tualatin, and West Linn as well as Portland's South Waterfront. It is composed of Oregon House districts 37 and 38. It is currently represented by Democrat Rob Wagner of Lake Oswego.

== Election results ==
District boundaries have changed over time. Therefore, senators before 2021 may not represent the same constituency as today. From 1993 until 2003, the district covered parts of the central Willamette Valley; from 2003 until 2013, it was similar to the current district with less of South Portland, Portland, Oregon; and from 2013 until 2023, it covered a similar area with the exception of Portland's South Waterfront and Far Southwest neighborhoods. The results are as follows

Year	Candidate	Party	Percent	Opponent	Party	Percent	Opponent	Party	Percent
1982	Mae Yih	Democratic	60.5%	Meredith Wiley	Republican	39.5%	No third candidate		
1986	Mae Yih	Democratic	100.0%	Unopposed					
1990	Mae Yih	Democratic	79.7%	Floyd D. Williams	Republican	20.3%	No third candidate		
1994	Mae Yih	Democratic	100.0%	Unopposed					
1998	Mae Yih	Democratic	62.8%	Carolyn Oakley	Republican	37.2%	No third candidate		
2002	Richard Devlin	Democratic	50.1%	Bob Tiernan	Republican	47.2%	David M. Akin	Libertarian	2.6%
2006	Richard Devlin	Democratic	61.3%	David Newell	Republican	36.2%	Marc L. Delphine	Libertarian	2.4%
2010	Richard Devlin	Democratic	54.7%	Mary Kremer	Republican	45.2%	Lars Hedbor	Libertarian	0.2%
2014	Richard Devlin	Democratic	96.0%	Unopposed					
2018	Rob Wagner	Democratic	65.5%	David Poulson	Republican	34.3%	No third candidate		
2022	Rob Wagner	Democratic	66.0%	Ben Edtl	Republican	33.9%	No third candidate		
