= Shemia Fagan =

American politician (born 1981)

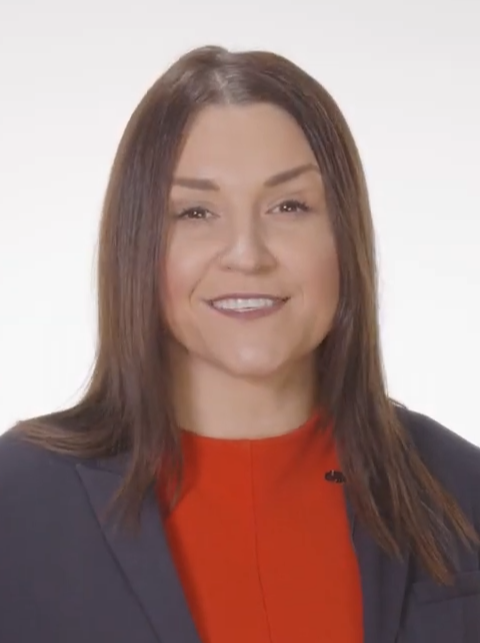
- Fagan in 2021

28th Secretary of State of Oregon
- In office January 4, 2021 – May 8, 2023
- Governor: Kate Brown; Tina Kotek
- Preceded by: Bev Clarno
- Succeeded by: Cheryl Myers (acting)

Member of the Oregon Senate from the 24th district
- In office January 14, 2019 – January 4, 2021
- Preceded by: Rod Monroe
- Succeeded by: Kayse Jama

Member of the Oregon House of Representatives from the 51st district
- In office January 14, 2013 – January 9, 2017
- Preceded by: Patrick Sheehan
- Succeeded by: Janelle Bynum

Personal details
- Born: September 20, 1981 (age 44) Portland, Oregon, U.S.
- Party: Democratic
- Education: Northwest Nazarene University (BA); Lewis and Clark College (JD)
- Website: Campaign website
- Shemia Fagan's voice Fagan opens an interview with John Legend about voting rights Recorded June 17, 2021

Shemia Patricia Fagan (born September 20, 1981) is an American lawyer and politician who served as the Oregon secretary of state from 2021 to 2023. She previously served as a Democratic member of the Oregon Senate, representing Senate District 24 from in 2019 to 2021. She also represented House District 51 from 2013 to 2017. In 2020, Fagan was elected as Oregon Secretary of State.

In May 2023, Fagan resigned from office after revelations that she took a consulting job at a cannabis company while her office was auditing Oregon's marijuana industry, which many considered to be a conflict of interest.

== Early life and education ==
Fagan was born in Portland, Oregon, and was raised in Dufur, Oregon, and The Dalles, Oregon by her father, with her two older brothers. She attended Northwest Nazarene University in Nampa, Idaho, on a soccer scholarship, where she earned her Bachelor of Arts in Philosophy and Religion in 2003. She then started law school at Willamette University College of Law in Salem, Oregon, before earning her Juris Doctor from Lewis & Clark Law School in 2009.

== Career ==
=== Early career ===
After graduating from law school, Fagan became an associate at the Ater Wynne law firm in Portland, Oregon. She was an employment law attorney with HKM Employment Attorneys.

In 2011, Fagan was elected to the David Douglas School Board in eastern Portland, serving for three years before running for 51st District of the Oregon House of Representatives.

=== Oregon Legislature ===
During her time within the State House, she served as the chair of the House Committee on Consumer Protection and Government Effectiveness. Fagan was elected to the 24th District of the Oregon State Senate during the 2018 elections; she chaired the Committee on Housing and Development and served on the Committee On Healthcare.

=== Secretary of State ===
In 2020, Fagan secured the Democratic nomination for Oregon Secretary of State in a close three-way race, and went on to defeat Republican Kim Thatcher in the general election. As Secretary of State, Fagan focused on expanding voter access, exposing inequalities through the Audits Division, and increasing public engagement with the office of the Secretary of State. Fagan successfully advocated for a "People's Commission" on redistricting following the 2020 Census.

==== Ethics investigation and resignation ====
On April 27, 2023, Willamette Week reported Fagan had been working as a private consultant for the owners of La Mota, a cannabis dispensary chain operating in Oregon, while the Audits Division, which reports to Fagan as Secretary of State, worked on an audit of the Oregon Liquor and Cannabis Commission. Fagan's office released a statement clarifying she had recused herself from the audit before the consulting contract began. La Mota was found to have given campaign contributions to Fagan and other state Democratic lawmakers. Republican leaders of the Oregon House of Representatives and the Oregon State Senate released a joint statement calling on Secretary Fagan to resign.

Governor Tina Kotek subsequently called for an ethics investigation by the Oregon Government Ethics Commission into Fagan's actions, along with an investigation by the Oregon Department of Justice into the audit. On May 1, Fagan announced she had terminated the consulting contract, which paid $10,000 a month. The next day, Fagan announced her resignation effective May 8, due to the investigations.

On August 25, 2023, the Oregon Government Ethics Commission launched an investigation into Fagan in regards to potential personal uses of state funds and campaign finances. Additionally, there are reports of Fagan reimbursing herself from both the state and campaign funds, a violation of Oregon law.

== Political positions ==
=== Abortion ===
Fagan supports abortion rights. In 2023, on the 50th anniversary of the Roe v. Wade decision, Fagan released a statement saying she believes that, "The right to control your own body and future is fundamental to our freedom in America."

=== Economy and labor ===
During the COVID-19 pandemic in the United States, including Oregon, Fagan voted to authorize unemployment benefits for employees working less than full time. Fagan also supported a bill in 2019 that would establish 12 weeks of paid medical leave for workers. During the same year, Fagan supported HB 2016, which provided additional privileges to labor unions in bolstering worker participation.

=== Environment ===
During her time within the Oregon House, Fagan was supportive of several key environmental bills, receiving a 100% rating from the Oregon League of Conservation Voters (OLCV). She supported SB 1547 Coal Transition and Clean Electricity Plan which set goals for Oregon to go coal-free by 2030. In 2020, the Oregon League of Conservation Voters endorsed Fagan during the Secretary of State race.

=== Health care ===
In 2019, Fagan supported HB 3076, which established standards for non-profit hospitals in Oregon, demanding non-profit hospitals to adjust patients' costs on the basis of federal poverty guidelines and prohibiting non-profit hospitals from charging interest on medical debt.

=== Housing ===
As Secretary of State, Fagan directed the Audits Division to conduct the first ever audit of Oregon's mortgage interest deduction since its inception in 1923. The audit found that the $1.1 billion housing subsidy "mostly benefits wealthy, white homeowners in the urban counties." In response to the audit, Fagan called the mortgage interest deduction "indefensible."

== Electoral history ==
=== 2012 ===
Oregon's State House 51st District Democratic Primary Election, 2012
Party	Candidate	Votes	%
Democratic	Shemia Fagan	2,765	98.18%
	Misc.	51	1.81%
Total votes		2,816	100%

Oregon's State House 51st District Election, 2012
Party	Candidate	Votes	%	±%
Democratic	Shemia Fagan	12,584	52.8%	N/A
Republican	Patrick Sheehan (Incumbent)	11,199	47.2%	N/A
Total votes		23,783	100.0%	
Democratic gain from Republican				

=== 2014 ===
Oregon's State House 51st District Election, 2014
Party	Candidate	Votes	%	±%
Democratic	Shemia Fagan (Incumbent)	10,518	52.4%	N/A
Republican	Jodi Bailey	9,450	47.1%	N/A
Total votes		20,064	100.0%	
Democratic hold				

=== 2018 ===
Democratic primary for Oregon State Senate District 24
Party	Candidate	Votes	%	±%
Democratic	Shemia Fagan	6,628	62.0%	N/A
Democratic	Rod Monroe (incumbent)	2,151	20.1%	N/A
Democratic	Kayse Jama	1,906	17.8%	N/A
Total votes		10,685	100.0%	

General election for Oregon State Senate District 24
Party	Candidate	Votes	%	±%
Democratic	Shemia Fagan	30,887	95.1%	N/A
Write-in		1,606	4.9%	N/A
Total votes		32,493	100.0%	
Democratic hold				

=== 2020 ===
Democratic primary results
Party	Candidate	Votes	%
Democratic	Shemia Fagan	209,682	36.23%
Democratic	Mark Hass	205,230	35.46%
Democratic	Jamie McLeod-Skinner	159,430	27.55%
Democratic	Write-ins	4,395	0.76%
Total votes		578,737	100.0%

2020 Oregon Secretary of State election
Party	Candidate	Votes	%	±%
Democratic	Shemia Fagan	1,146,370	50.31%	+6.84%
Republican	Kim Thatcher	984,597	43.21%	−3.85%
Pacific Green	Nathalie Paravicini	82,211	3.61%	+1.06%
Libertarian	Kyle Markley	62,985	2.77%	+0.29%
Write-in		2,340	0.10%	-0.09%
Total votes		2,278,503	100.0%	
Democratic gain from Republican				

Political offices
Preceded by Bev Clarno	Secretary of State of Oregon; 2021–2023	Succeeded by Cheryl Myers; Acting
