= Peter Courtney =

American politician (1943–2024)

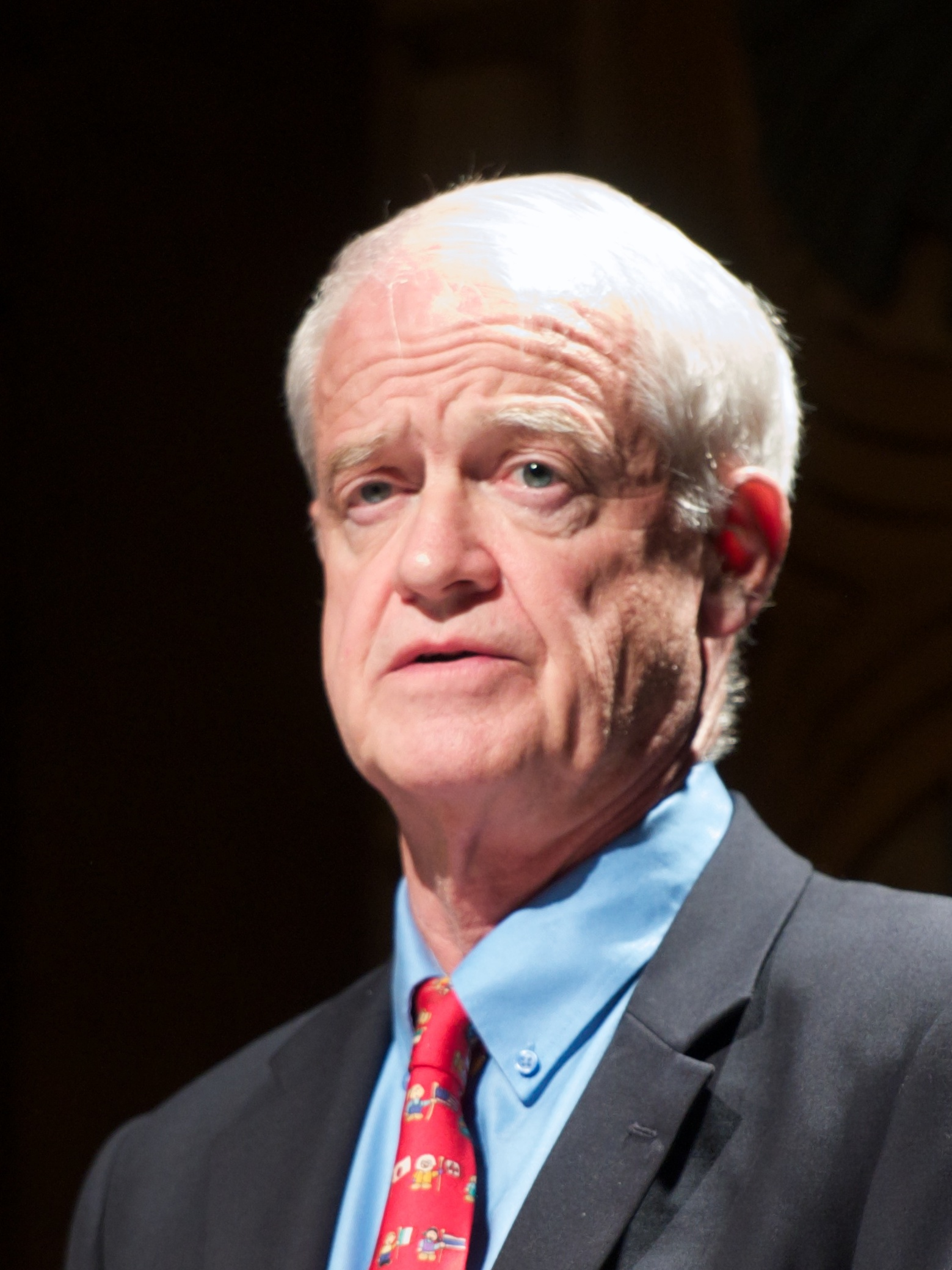
- Courtney in 2011

55th President of the Oregon Senate
- In office January 3, 2003 – January 9, 2023
- Preceded by: Gene Derfler
- Succeeded by: Rob Wagner

Member of the Oregon Senate from the 11th district
- In office January 3, 1999 – January 9, 2023
- Preceded by: Gene Derfler
- Succeeded by: Kim Thatcher

Minority Leader of the Oregon House of Representatives
- In office 1991–1999
- Preceded by: David Dix
- Succeeded by: Kitty Piercy

Member of the Oregon House of Representatives from the 33rd district
- In office 1989–1999
- Preceded by: Mike Kopetski
- Succeeded by: Vic Backlund
- In office 1981–1985
- Preceded by: Chick Edwards
- Succeeded by: Mike Kopetski

Personal details
- Born: Peter Michael Coleman Courtney; June 18, 1943 Philadelphia, Pennsylvania, U.S.
- Died: July 16, 2024 (aged 81) Salem, Oregon, U.S.
- Party: Democratic
- Spouse: Margie Brenden (m. 1976)
- Children: 3
- Education: University of Rhode Island (BA, MPA); Boston University (JD)

Peter Michael Coleman Courtney (June 18, 1943 – July 16, 2024) was an American politician, lawyer, and professor who was a Democratic member of the Oregon State Senate, representing the 11th District (in Marion County and including parts of Salem, Woodburn, and Gervais) from 1999 until 2023. He served as President of the Senate from 2003 to 2023, the longest tenure in state history.

Courtney was a member of the Oregon House of Representatives from 1981 to 1985 and from 1989 through 1998. Courtney previously taught at Western Oregon University.

== Early life ==
Courtney was born in Philadelphia, Pennsylvania, on June 18, 1943. He grew up in Moorestown, New Jersey, West Virginia, Rhode Island, and Virginia, the son of a life insurance agent. Both his parents earned college degrees, with his mother's degree in Latin.

In high school, Courtney played on the school's football team. He attended college at the University of Rhode Island where he earned a bachelor's degree in political science in 1965 and a master's in public administration the following year. He graduated from Boston University's law school, and then moved to Oregon in 1969 to become the law clerk of William S. Fort of the Oregon Court of Appeals.

Courtney arrived in Salem and stayed at the YMCA for two years.

== Political career ==
Courtney's first political office was as a member of the Salem City Council where he served from 1974 until 1980. He was first elected to the Oregon Legislative Assembly in 1980 as a Democrat representing Marion and Polk counties in the Oregon House of Representatives.

Courtney gave up his House seat to run for the U.S. House of Representatives, 5th district, in the 1984 primary. Courtney narrowly lost to state senator Ruth McFarland, who had been the 1982 nominee. In the House he served as Democratic leader for eight years, longer than anyone else had before him. After repairs to the Oregon State Capitol were finished in 1995 after damage from the 1993 Scotts Mills earthquake, he gave a small piece of marble with an engraved image of the building to each Democrat in the House. He served as minority leader during the 1997 session.

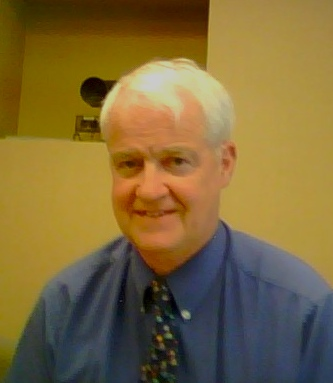
Courtney in June 2008

He avoided term limits by moving from the House to the Senate in 1999, representing only Marion County. In 2002, he had surgery to remove a burst appendix and even received last rites prior to the surgery when survival was unknown. After 13 days at the hospital he recovered and returned to the legislature.

In 2003, Courtney was selected as the President of the Oregon State Senate. The Senate was evenly divided between the state's major parties at the time, with 15 Democrats and 15 Republicans. Republican Lenn Hannon was chosen as President Pro-tem; the two were recognized as having forged a strong bipartisan working relationship during the previous legislature's five emergency sessions. Courtney was the longest-serving legislator and Senate President in Oregon's history. His support and advocacy in animal-related measures saw him labeled as a 2011 "Top Dog" by the Oregon Humane Society. In January 2022, Courtney announced he would not seek reelection to the Oregon Senate due to health issues.

Courtney served as co-chair of the Legislative Counsel Committee, the Legislative Policy and Research Committee, and the Legislative Administrative Committee.

== Personal life and death ==
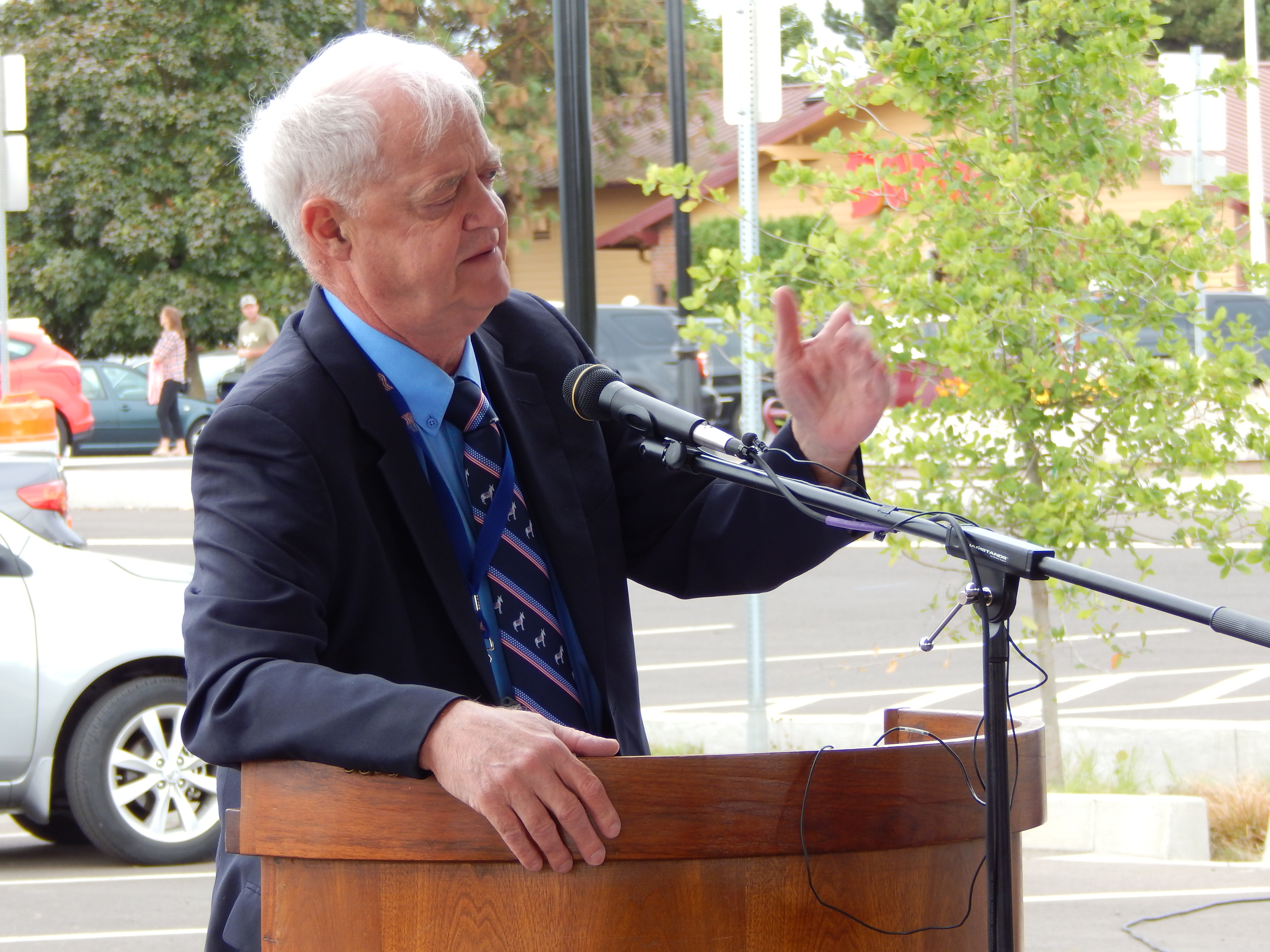
Courtney in September 2015

Courtney taught speech at Western Oregon University, and served as an administrator at the Monmouth school. He married Margie Brenden in 1976; they had three sons.

He worked as a political commentator for KPTV television and KSLM (now KZGD, as of 2020) radio. Courtney appeared in the documentary film Running Forward: Conquering Oregon's Hood to Coast Relay, that was released in 2011. He served on several boards of directors, and was a member of the Oregon State Bar.

In 2021, Courtney had one of his kidneys removed due to his ureteral cancer. He previously had colon cancer in the 1990s. In 2023, he was diagnosed with heart failure and in January 2024, had a heart valve replaced.

Courtney died from complications of cancer in Salem, on July 16, 2024, at the age of 81.

== Electoral history ==
2006 Oregon State Senator, 11th district
Party	Candidate	Votes	%
Democratic	Peter Courtney	15,593	57.3
Republican	Jared Thatcher	10,814	39.7
Constitution	Keith Humphrey	767	2.8
Write-in		49	0.2
Total votes		27,223	100%

2010 Oregon State Senator, 11th district
Party	Candidate	Votes	%
Democratic	Peter Courtney	14,883	54.6
Republican	Michael W Forest	12,280	45.1
Write-in		90	0.3
Total votes		27,253	100%

2014 Oregon State Senator, 11th district
Party	Candidate	Votes	%
Democratic	Peter Courtney	16,179	54.3
Republican	Patricia Milne	13,442	45.1
Write-in		178	0.6
Total votes		29,799	100%

2018 Oregon State Senator, 11th district
Party	Candidate	Votes	%
Democratic	Peter Courtney	22,772	60.5
Republican	Greg Warnock	14,760	39.2
Write-in		119	0.3
Total votes		37,651	100%

== See also ==
- List of Oregon Legislative Assemblies

Political offices
Preceded by Gene Derfler	President of the Oregon Senate; 2003–2023	Succeeded by Rob Wagner
