= Kim Thatcher =

American politician (born 1964)

Member of the Oregon Senate from the 11th district
- Incumbent
- Assumed office January 9, 2023
- Preceded by: Peter Courtney
- Succeeded by: Virginia Stapleton (elect)

Member of the Oregon Senate from the 13th district
- In office January 12, 2015 – January 9, 2023
- Preceded by: Larry George
- Succeeded by: Aaron Woods

Member of the Oregon House of Representatives from the 25th district
- In office January 10, 2005 – January 12, 2015
- Preceded by: Vic Backlund
- Succeeded by: Bill Post

Personal details
- Born: Lona Kim Thatcher; October 30, 1964 (age 62) Pocatello, Idaho, U.S.
- Party: Republican
- Education: Portland State University
- Website: https://kimthatcher.com

Lona Kim Thatcher (born 1964) is an American politician currently serving as a member of the Oregon State Senate for the 11th district since 2023. She previously represented the 13th district from 2015 to 2023, and served as a member of the Oregon House of Representatives for the 25th district from 2005 to 2015.

== Early life and education ==
Thatcher was born Lona Kim Thatcher in Pocatello, Idaho, in 1964 and attended Portland State University.

== Career ==
Thatcher was first elected to the Oregon House of Representatives in 2004, representing the Keizer area. In May 2005, Thatcher successfully sponsored a bill to limit public access to information about concealed handgun license. She was reelected in 2006, 2008, 2010, and 2012. In 2014, Thatcher chose to run for a seat in the Oregon Senate, held by the retiring Larry George, rather than seek re-election to her house seat.

Thatcher owned KT Contracting, a highway construction firm, and an affiliated company, Highway Specialties LLC. After a 2005 state highway subcontract in Eugene, the Oregon Department of Transportation blamed KT Contracting for delays and assessed the company $214,000. The company sued but dropped the case midway through trial. State officials accused the company of destroying evidence, and in 2010, KT Contracting was fined $60,000 after a judged ruled that records were intentionally destroyed. The Oregon Department of Justice investigated alleged racketeering and closed the case in 2012 without bringing charges. Thatcher said she and her companies did nothing wrong and that she was targeted because of her criticism of ODOT in the legislature.

Thatcher was a delegate to the 2016 Republican National Convention, where she cast her vote for Donald Trump as the nominee. While she initially supported Ted Cruz, she ended the convention supporting Trump for president stating: "I can honestly say I feel less uncomfortable with Trump."

=== Legislation ===
Thatcher was one of several cosponsors of legislation in 2009 to establish an Oregon's first transparency website; the measure passed the Senate unanimously and was signed into law by then-Governor Ted Kulongoski. Thatcher was a chief sponsor of legislation signed into law in 2011 that expanded Oregon's transparency web site to include economic development tax incentives, and in 2013 was a sponsor of legislation that required the state transparency website to post additional materials, such as minutes or summaries of public meetings, additional state contracts, and information on tax expenditures under Oregon Low Income Community Jobs Initiatives. Thatcher was the sponsor of subsequent successful legislation in 2015 and 2017 that expanded the material on the state transparency website.

In 2017, Thatcher introduced a bill that would have required public universities and community colleges in Oregon to expel students convicted of rioting. Thatcher introduced similar legislation in 2011.

Thatcher participated in the 2019 Oregon Senate Republican walkouts.

On December 2020, Thatcher and 11 other Oregon Republican legislators signed a letter urging Attorney General Ellen Rosenblum to join Texas v. Pennsylvania, a lawsuit seeking to block four states' presidential electors. Rosenblum had announced the previous day that she had joined other attorneys general in opposing the suit, and the U.S. Supreme Court rejected it on December 11.

In October 2021, Thatcher was one of more that 130 Republican legislators who signed a letter calling for audits of the 2020 election in all 50 states. The letter said a review of Maricopa County, Arizona ballots showed a corrupted election. That review, commissioned by Arizona Senate Republicans and conducted by Cyber Ninjas, found Joe Biden won the county by slightly more votes than the official count.

=== 2020 secretary of state campaign ===
On February 10, 2020, Thatcher announced her campaign for the office of Oregon secretary of state in the 2020 general election. She defeated Dave Stauffer to become the Republican Party nominee on May 19, 2020, but lost (43.2%) to Democrat Shemia Fagan (50.3%).

=== 2023 walkout ===
In May 2023, Thatcher took part in a Senate Republican walkout that stalled bills on abortion, transgender health care, and gun rights. After the secretary of state announced she would enforce Measure 113, which bars legislators with 10 or more unexcused absences from running for reelection, Thatcher was among the ten senators disqualified. On February 1, 2024, the Court unanimously upheld the secretary of state's rules. Her term ends in January 2027 and she will be succeeded by Virginia Stapleton.

== Electoral history ==
2004 Oregon State Representative, 25th district
Party	Candidate	Votes	%
Republican	Kim Thatcher	16,836	64.0
Democratic	Roger Pike	9,319	35.4
Write-in		152	0.6
Total votes		26,307	100%

2006 Oregon State Representative, 25th district
Party	Candidate	Votes	%
Republican	Kim Thatcher	11,956	57.0
Democratic	Charles E. Lee	8,977	42.8
Write-in		38	0.2
Total votes		20,971	100%

2008 Oregon State Representative, 25th district
Party	Candidate	Votes	%
Republican	Kim Thatcher	20,345	95.8
Write-in		889	4.2
Total votes		21,234	100%

2010 Oregon State Representative, 25th district
Party	Candidate	Votes	%
Republican	Kim Thatcher	14,770	66.0
Democratic	Jim Dyer	7,530	33.7
Write-in		65	0.3
Total votes		22,365	100%

2012 Oregon State Representative, 25th district
Party	Candidate	Votes	%
Republican	Kim Thatcher	16,670	63.4
Democratic	Paul Holman	8,858	33.7
Libertarian	Ryan Haffner	698	2.7
Write-in		47	0.2
Total votes		26,273	100%

2014 Oregon State Senator, 13th district
Party	Candidate	Votes	%
Republican	Kim Thatcher	27,638	58.5
Democratic	Ryan Howard	19,434	41.2
Write-in		136	0.3
Total votes		47,208	100%

2018 Oregon State Senator, 13th district
Party	Candidate	Votes	%
Republican	Kim Thatcher	34,888	55.9
Democratic	Sarah Grider	27,415	43.9
Write-in		89	0.1
Total votes		62,392	100%

2020 Oregon Secretary of State election
Party	Candidate	Votes	%
Democratic	Shemia Fagan	1,146,370	50.3
Republican	Kim Thatcher	984,597	43.2
Pacific Green	Nathalie Paravicini	82,211	3.6
Libertarian	Kyle Markley	62,985	2.8
Write-in		2,340	0.1
Total votes		2,278,503	100%

2022 Oregon State Senator, 11th district
Party	Candidate	Votes	%
Republican	Kim Thatcher	22,238	52.5
Democratic	Richard (Rich) Walsh	20,054	47.3
Write-in		105	0.2
Total votes		42,397	100%

Oregon House of Representatives
Preceded by Vic Backlund	Member of the Oregon House of Representatives from the 25th district 2005-2015	Succeeded by Bill Post
