= Oregon's 6th Senate district =

American legislative district

Oregon's 6th Senate District as of September 27, 2021

District 6 of the Oregon State Senate includes most of Linn County as well as eastern Lane County and a sliver of southern Marion County. It is composed of Oregon House districts 11 and 12. It is currently represented by Republican Cedric Ross Hayden of Fall Creek.

== Election results ==
District boundaries have changed over time. Therefore, senators before 2023 may not represent the same constituency as today. From 1993 until 2003, the district covered western Multnomah County; from 2003 until 2013, it covered northern Lane County from Springfield east to Walterville and south to Creswell and Dexter and rural central Linn County surrounding Brownsville and Sweet Home; and from 2013 until 2023, it stayed mostly the same, losing Dexter and Sweet Home but gaining Coburg and Harrisburg.

The current district differs greatly from previous iterations by the inclusion of all of eastern Lane County and all of eastern Linn County up to Lebanon as well as the inclusion of Cottage Grove and Junction City and the loss of most of Springfield, rendering the district substantially more rural in character and conservative in voting patterns.

The results are as follows:

Year	Candidate	Party	Percent	Opponent	Party	Percent	Opponent	Party	Percent
1984	Jan Wyers	Democratic	51.4%	Carolyn Gaudry	Republican	48.6%	No third candidate		
1988	Dick Springer	Democratic	61.5%	Kay Durtschi	Republican	38.5%	No third candidate		
1992	Dick Springer	Democratic	72.6%	John E. Strand	Republican	27.4%	No third candidate		
1996	Ginny Burdick	Democratic	69.7%	Jim Davis	Republican	30.3%	No third candidate		
2000	Ginny Burdick	Democratic	96.5%	Unopposed					
2002	Bill Morrisette	Democratic	99.5%	Unopposed					
2006	Bill Morrisette	Democratic	67.2%	Renee Lindsey	Republican	32.8%	No third candidate		
2010	Lee Beyer	Democratic	51.8%	Michael Spasaro	Republican	43.0%	Scott Reynolds	Independent	5.0%
2014	Lee Beyer	Democratic	58.7%	Michael Spasaro	Republican	41.0%	No third candidate		
2018	Lee Beyer	Democratic	59.1%	Robert Schwartz	Republican	40.7%	No third candidate		
2022	Cedric Ross Hayden	Republican	65.1%	Ashley Pelton	Democratic	34.7%	No third candidate		
