= Oregon's 24th Senate district =

American legislative district

Oregon's 24th Senate District as of September 27, 2021

District 24 of the Oregon State Senate comprises parts of Clackamas and Multnomah counties. Since January 2021, it has been represented by Democrat Kayse Jama, who was appointed unanimously by the Clackamas and Multnomah County Boards of Commissioners to replace Shemia Fagan after she was elected Oregon Secretary of State.

== Election results ==
District boundaries have changed over time. Therefore, senators before 2021 may not represent the same constituency as today. From 1993 until 2003, the district covered the southern Oregon Coast; from 2003 until 2013, it shifted to cover outer east Portland and Happy Valley; and from 2013 until 2023, it lost much of its southeastern portion, including Happy Valley, while gaining parts of Clackamas.

The current district is somewhat similar to its previous iteration. It regained its coverage of east Portland while having its Clackamas County lands shift to the southeast, now covering greater Damascus and only the eastern part of Happy Valley.

The results are as follows:

Year	Candidate	Party	Percent	Opponent	Party	Percent	Opponent	Party	Percent
1984	Bill Bradbury	Democratic	63.7%	James Bedingfield	Republican	36.3%	No third candidate		
1988	Bill Bradbury	Democratic	57.7%	Mike Whitty	Republican	42.3%	No third candidate		
1992	Bill Bradbury	Democratic	100.0%	Unopposed					
1996	Veral E. Tamo	Republican	52.5%	Brenda W. Brecke	Democratic	47.7%	No third candidate		
2000	Ken Messerle	Republican	53.2%	Roger W. McCorkle	Democratic	46.8%	No third candidate		
2002	Frank Shields	Democratic	56.8%	Cletus Moore	Republican	42.6%	No third candidate		
2006	Rod Monroe	Democratic	48.7%	T. J. Reilly	Republican	43.6%	Ron McCarty	Nonpartisan	7.5%
2010	Rod Monroe	Democratic	51.9%	Rob Wheeler	Republican	47.8%	No third candidate		
2014	Rod Monroe	Democratic	95.1%	Unopposed					
2018	Shemia Fagan	Democratic	95.1%	Unopposed					
2022 (Note: Kayse Jama was the incumbent in this election after being appointed to the seat in 2021 after the resignation of Shemia Fagan, who was elected Oregon Secretary of State.)	Kayse Jama	Democratic	58.7%	Stan Catherman	Republican	41.2%	No third candidate		
