= Oregon's 11th Senate district =

American legislative district

Oregon's 11th Senate District as of September 27, 2021

District 11 of the Oregon State Senate comprises parts of Marion County, including Keizer, Woodburn and much of Salem. It contains Oregon House districts 21 and 22. It is currently represented by Republican Kim Thatcher of Keizer.

== Election results ==
District boundaries have changed over time. Therefore, senators before 2013 may not represent the same constituency as today. From 1993 until 2003, the district covered parts of Multnomah County; from 2003 until 2013, it shifted to cover south, east, and north Salem apart from the downtown as well as Woodburn; and from 2013 until 2023, it lost much of south Salem but added the downtown core.

The current district is similar to its previous iterations, adding Keizer and Saint Louis while losing all of south Salem and the southern part of downtown.

The results are as follows:

Year	Candidate	Party	Percent	Opponent	Party	Percent	Opponent	Party	Percent
1984	Glenn Otto	Democratic	100.0%	Unopposed					
1988	Glenn Otto	Democratic	100.0%	Unopposed					
1992	John Lim	Republican	59.0%	Ruth McFarland	Democratic	41.0%	No third candidate		
1996	John Lim	Republican	84.1%	Margaret M. Baker	Socialist	8.8%	John Benneth	Libertarian	7.1%
2000	John Minnis	Republican	55.2%	Chris Gorsek	Democratic	43.2%	Art Scarborough	Socialist	1.3%
2002	Peter Courtney	Democratic	55.3%	Randy Franke	Republican	44.7%	No third candidate		
2006	Peter Courtney	Democratic	57.3%	Jared Thatcher	Republican	39.7%	Keith Humphrey	Constitution	2.8%
2010	Peter Courtney	Democratic	54.6%	Michael W. Forest	Republican	45.1%	No third candidate		
2014	Peter Courtney	Democratic	53.5%	Patti Milne	Republican	46.0%	No third candidate		
2018	Peter Courtney	Democratic	60.5%	Greg Warnock	Republican	39.2%	No third candidate		
2022	Kim Thatcher	Republican	52.5%	Rich Walsh	Democratic	47.3%	No third candidate		
