= Jeff Golden =

American politician

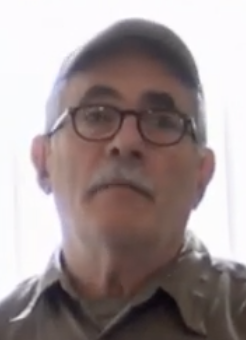
- Golden in 2019

Member of the Oregon State Senate from the 3rd district
- Incumbent
- Assumed office January 14, 2019
- Preceded by: Alan DeBoer
- Succeeded by: Denise Krause (elect)

Personal details
- Born: April 24, 1950 (age 76) Los Angeles, California, U.S.
- Party: Democratic
- Spouse: Catherine Shaw (m. 1979; div. 1994)
- Children: 2
- Education: Harvard University (BA) Stanford University (MA)
- Profession: Radio personality, author, politician
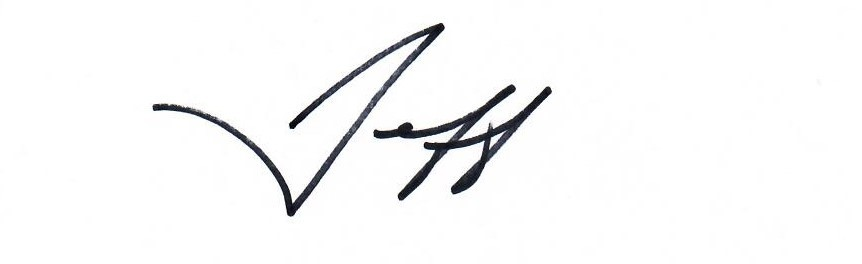
- Signature

Jeffrey Golden (born April 24, 1950) is an American politician, broadcaster, and author from Southern Oregon. A Democrat, he has represented District 3 in the Oregon State Senate since 2019 and is retiring when his term ends in January 2027. Earlier in his career, he served as a Jackson County commissioner, hosted Jefferson Public Radio's Jefferson Exchange, and created the public television program Immense Possibilities. He is the author of the 1971 memoir Watermelon Summer and several other books.

== Early life and education ==
Golden attended Harvard University as a National Scholar, but left to move to rural Southern Oregon. He spent a summer volunteering at Featherfield Farm, a southwest Georgia farm intended to help Black sharecroppers escape poverty, and in 1971, published a memoir, Watermelon Summer: A Journal. He later earned a master's degree in communications from Stanford University.

In the early 1970s, Golden worked as a river guide. Golden and his then girlfriend, Catherine Shaw, appeared in the 1978 documentary Riverdogs directed by Robb Moss, which followed a group on a rafting trip down the Colorado River. Golden and Shaw also appeared in Moss's 2003 documentary film The Same River Twice. Golden and Shaw were married in 1979 and had two children before divorcing.

== Career ==
For 10 years, Golden was the host for Jefferson Public Radio’s show Jefferson Exchange, from 1997-2007. Golden left the radio show in June 2007. In August 2007, he started a new independent radio program called Immense Possibilities Radio (IPR).

=== Politics ===
Golden served on the Jackson County Board of Commissioners. In 1989, he was the target of a recall effort by logging interests opposed to his environmental positions.

In 1990, Golden ran for the Oregon State Senate and lost to Republican incumbent Lenn Hannon. Golden took a position as Bill Bradbury’s Chief of Staff in 1993.

In June 2007, after leaving Jefferson Public Radio, Golden said he was considering a run for the U.S. Senate seat held by Republican Gordon Smith. He did not enter the race.

In 2018, Golden won election to State Senate in District 3, defeated Republican Jessica Gomez, and returning the seat to Democratic control. He was reelected in 2022, defeating Republican Randy Sparacino.

In October 2022, during his re-election campaign, news reports on Watermelon Summer drew criticism for its repeated use of a racial slur. Fox News first reported the passages, and the Oregon Capital Chronicle obtained and reviewed the book and confirmed them. Oregon Republican Party chair Justin Hwang called for Golden to resign. Golden said he would not write the book the same way today but defended it as the work of a 20-year-old, said he had learned the word is harmful in any context, and apologized for the offense the passages caused.

In late February 2024, Golden announced he would seek the Democratic nomination for state treasurer, then reversed course on March 4, saying he would remain in the Senate. He said he was uneasy about the fundraising a late entry would require and wanted to keep working on wildfire funding and campaign finance reform.

Golden chaired the Senate Natural Resources Committee from 2023 to 2025. In 2025, he voted with a unanimous Senate to repeal the statewide wildfire hazard map created by SB 762 (2021), which he had also voted for. He said misinformation, insurance premium increases, and the map's broad approach had undermined it. He spoke in support of HB 3940, which created dedicated wildfire funding through a tax on synthetic nicotine pouches.

In February 2026, after filing for reelection, Golden withdrew from the race and announced he would retire at the end of his term, citing the recent deaths of close friends and frustration with the pace of the short legislative session. In November 2026, Denise Krause won the election to replace him.

== Works ==
=== Books ===
- Watermelon Summer: A Journal Published (1971) - a journal of the summer of 1970 he spent volunteering at Featherfield Farm, a farm cooperative of Black sharecropper families in southwest Georgia. (ISBN 0397007701)
- Forest Blood (1999) - a novel about the Northwest timber wars challenging the dichotomy of "us versus them" between the environmentalists and loggers in Southern Oregon. (ISBN 0964706679)
- As If We Were Grownups: A Collection of "Suicidal" Political Speeches That Aren’t (2004) - is based on the premise that politicians address the American public as though they were children and is a collection of speeches that are addressed to an audience that would be the least likely to want to hear them. (ISBN 1883991730)
- Unafraid: A Novel of the Possible - an alternate history premised on John F. Kennedy surviving the assassination attempt in Dallas and serving two full terms. (ISBN 0595471927)

=== Filmography ===
- Riverdogs (1978) - short documentary by Robb Moss about a month-long Grand Canyon rafting trip on the Colorado River by Moss and 16 friends, including Golden.
- The Same River Twice (2003) - a follow-up documentary on the lives of the cast in Riverdogs

== Electoral history ==
2018 Oregon State Senator, 3rd district
| Party | Candidate | Votes | % |
|---|---|---|---|
| Democratic | Jeff Golden | 35,834 | 55.2 |
| Republican | Jessica Gomez | 29,065 | 44.7 |
| Write-in | | 75 | 0.1 |
| Total votes | | 64,974 | 100% |

2022 Oregon State Senator, 3rd district
| Party | Candidate | Votes | % |
|---|---|---|---|
| Democratic | Jeff Golden | 33,468 | 51.9 |
| Republican | Randy Sparacino | 30,980 | 48.0 |
| Write-in | | 51 | 0.1 |
| Total votes | | 64,499 | 100% |
