= Oregon's 13th Senate district =

American legislative district

Oregon's 13th Senate District as of September 27, 2021

District 13 of the Oregon State Senate comprises parts of Clackamas, Washington, and Yamhill counties centered around Sherwood, Tigard, and Wilsonville. It contains Oregon House districts 25 and 26. Following the death of Democrat Aaron Woods of Wilsonville on April 19, 2025, Democratic Representative Courtney Neron Misslin was appointed to finish out his term by county commissioners.

== Election results ==
District boundaries have changed over time. Therefore, senators before 2021 may not represent the same constituency as today. From 1993 until 2023, it covered various areas in the northern Willamette valley stretching from Hillsboro to Keizer.

The current district shrunk from its previous iterations due to population growth in Washington County, losing Keizer and all land in Marion County as well as all parts of Hillsboro.

The results are as follows:

Year	Candidate	Party	Percent	Opponent	Party	Percent
1982	Joyce Cohen	Democratic	55.6%	Richard Smelser	Republican	44.4%
1986	Joyce Cohen	Democratic	53.8%	Bob Tiernan	Republican	46.2%
1990	Joyce Cohen	Democratic	52.0%	Bob Tiernan	Republican	48.0%
1994	Randy Miller	Republican	66.4%	Robert L. Lumm	Democratic	33.6%
1998	Randy Miller	Republican	59.3%	Ken Libbey	Democratic	40.7%
2002	Charles Starr	Republican	59.9%	Ken Crowley	Democratic	40.1%
2006	Larry George	Republican	59.0%	Rick Ross	Democratic	40.8%
2010	Larry George	Republican	63.2%	Timi Parker	Democratic	36.7%
2014	Kim Thatcher	Republican	57.7%	Ryan Howard	Democratic	42.1%
2018	Kim Thatcher	Republican	55.9%	Sarah Grider	Democratic	43.9%
2022	Aaron Woods	Democratic	58.0%	John Velez	Republican	41.9%
