= Oregon's 3rd Senate district =

American legislative district

Oregon's 3rd Senate District as of September 27, 2021

District 3 of the Oregon State Senate comprises southern Jackson County. It contains Oregon House districts 5 and 6. It is currently represented by Democrat Jeff Golden of Ashland.

== Election results ==
District boundaries have changed over time. Therefore, senators before 2021 may not represent the same constituency as today. From 1993 until 2003, the district covered parts of Washington and northern Multnomah counties; from 2003 until 2013, the district shifted to cover southern Jackson County; and from 2013 until 2023, the district boundaries only shifted slightly, covering more of Medford, adding the Applegate Valley, and losing Miller Mountain.

The current district is very similar to previous iterations, only losing significant area north of the Applegate River.

The results are as follows:

Year	Candidate	Party	Percent	Opponent	Party	Percent	Opponent	Party	Percent
1982	Nancy Ryles	Republican	67.4%	Gerry Brewster	Democratic	32.6%	No third candidate		
1986	Nancy Ryles	Republican	100.0%	Unopposed					
1988	Bob Shoemaker	Democratic	51.7%	Bill Bloom	Republican	48.3%	No third candidate		
1990	Bob Shoemaker	Democratic	53.1%	Sherre L. Calouri	Republican	46.9%	No third candidate		
1994	Tom Hartung	Republican	58.4%	Bob Shook	Democratic	41.6%	No third candidate		
1998	Tom Hartung	Republican	53.5%	Brad Avakian	Democratic	46.4%	No third candidate		
2002	Lenn Hannon	Republican	60.4%	Virginia Lemon	Democratic	39.6%	No third candidate		
2004	Alan C. Bates	Democratic	51.9%	Jim Wright	Republican	48.1%	No third candidate		
2006	Alan C. Bates	Democratic	63.7%	Lynn Aiello	Republican	36.1%	No third candidate		
2010	Alan C. Bates	Democratic	50.2%	Dave Dotterrer	Republican	49.7%	No third candidate		
2014	Alan C. Bates	Democratic	51.9%	Dave Dotterrer	Republican	44.7%	Art H. Krueger	Pacific Green	3.3%
2016 (Note: Off-cycle election after the death in office of Alan Bates.)	Alan DeBoer	Republican	50.2%	Tonia Moro	Democratic	49.6%	No third candidate		
2018	Jeff Golden	Democratic	55.2%	Jessica Gomez	Republican	44.7%	No third candidate		
2022	Jeff Golden	Democratic	51.9%	Randy Sparacino	Republican	48.0%	No third candidate		
