= 62nd Oregon Legislative Assembly =

←	61st Legislative Assembly	63rd Legislative Assembly	→
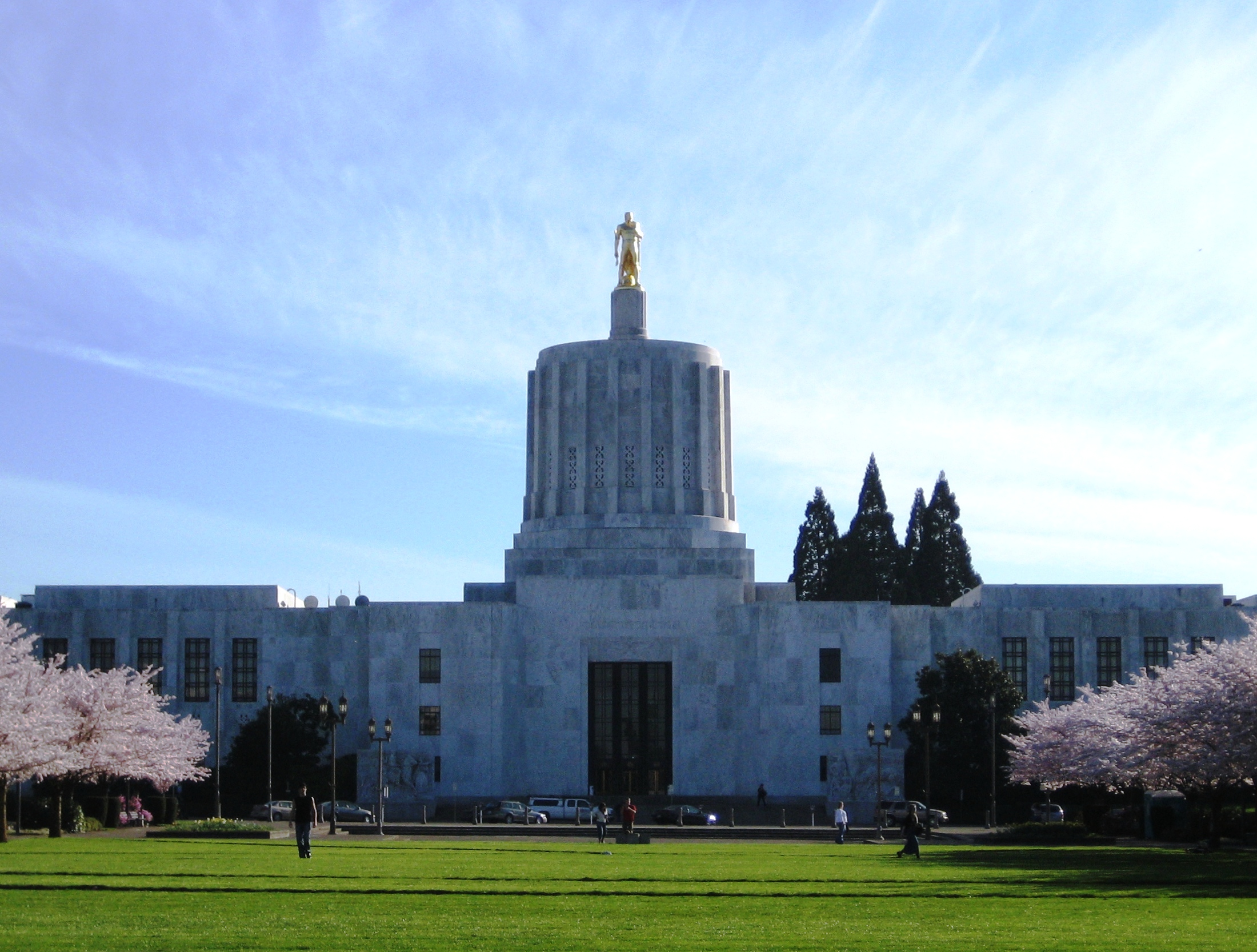
- The legislature took place in the Oregon State Capitol, seen here in 2007

Overview
- Legislative body: Oregon Legislative Assembly
- Jurisdiction: Oregon, United States
- Meeting place: Oregon State Capitol
- Term: 1983
- Website: www.oregonlegislature.gov

Oregon State Senate
- Members: 30 Senators
- Senate President: Edward Fadeley (D)
- Majority Leader: Jan Wyers (D)
- Minority Leader: Tony Meeker (R)
- Party control: Democratic Party of Oregon

Oregon House of Representatives
- Members: 60 Representatives
- Speaker of the House: Grattan Kerans (D)
- Majority Leader: Barbara Roberts (D)
- Minority Leader: Larry Campbell (R)
- Party control: Democratic Party of Oregon

The 62nd Oregon Legislative Assembly was the legislative session of the Oregon Legislative Assembly that convened on January 10, 1983, and adjourned July 16, 1983.

== Senate ==
Affiliation	Members
Democratic	22
Republican	8
Total	30
Government Majority	14

Fred Heard resigned on July 19, 1983; Judy Carnahan was appointed to fill vacancy

== Senate Members ==
Composition of the Senate
District	Senator	Party
1	Charles Hanlon	Democratic
2	Dell Isham	Democratic
3	Nancy Ryles	Republican
4	James M. Simmons	Republican
5	Jeannette Hamby	Democratic
6	Jan Wyers (Majority Leader)	Democratic
7	Rod Monroe	Democratic
8	William McCoy	Democratic
9	Frank L. Roberts	Democratic
10	Jim Gardner	Democratic
11	Ruth McFarland	Democratic
12	Walter F. Brown	Democratic
13	Joyce Cohen	Democratic
14	Steve Starkovich	Democratic
15	Tony Meeker (Minority Leader)	Republican
16	L. B. Day	Republican
17	Cub Houck	Republican
18	Clifford W. Trow	Democratic
19	Mae Yih	Democratic
20	Margie Hendriksen	Democratic
21	Edward Fadeley (President)	Democratic
22	William Frye	Democratic
23	John Kitzhaber	Democratic
24	Jack Ripper	Democratic
25	Eugene "Debbs" Potts	Democratic
26	Lenn Lamar L. Hannon	Republican
27	Fred W. Heard	Democratic
28	Kenneth Jernstedt	Republican
29	Michael G. Thorne	Democratic
30	Eugene D. Timms	Republican

== House ==
Affiliation	Members
Democratic	37
Republican	23
Total	60
Government Majority	14

== House Members ==
Composition of the House
District	House Member	Party
1	Bruce Hugo	Democratic
2	Tom Hanlon	Democratic
3	Paul Hanneman	Republican
4	Max C. Rijken	Democratic
5	Al Young	Democratic
6	Delna Jones	Republican
7	Ted L. Calouri	Republican
8	Mary Alice Ford	Republican
9	Norman J. Smith	Republican
10	Vera Katz	Democratic
11	Thomas L. Mason	Democratic
12	Dick Springer	Democratic
13	Rick Bauman	Democratic
14	Shirley Gold	Democratic
15	Hardy Myers	Democratic
16	Barbara Roberts (Majority Leader)	Democratic
17	Wally Priestley	Democratic
18	Ed Leek	Democratic
19	Jane Cease	Democratic
20	Annette Farmer	Democratic
21	Lonnie J. Roberts	Democratic
22	Glenn E. Otto	Democratic
23	Robert R. Shiprack	Democratic
24	Randy Miller	Republican
25	Glen Whallon	Democratic
26	Robin Lindquist	Democratic
27	Darlene Hooley	Democratic
28	Fred Parkinson	Republican
29	Bill Rutherford	Republican
30	Jeff Gilmour	Democratic
31	Jim Hill	Democratic
32	Donna B. Zajonc	Republican
33	Peter Courtney	Democratic
34	John Schoon	Republican
35	Tony Van Vliet	Republican
36	Mike McCracken	Democratic
37	Liz VanLeeuwen	Republican
38	Chuck Bennett	Democratic
39	Grattan Kerans (Speaker)	Democratic
40	Carl Hosticka	Democratic
41	Mary Burrows	Republican
42	Larry D. Hill	Democratic
43	Larry Campbell (Minority Leader)	Republican
44	Peggy Jolin	Democratic
45	Andy Anderson	Republican
46	Bill Markham	Republican
47	Jim L. Scavera	Democratic
48	Bill Bradbury	Democratic
49	George Trahern	Republican
50	Rebecca DeBoer	Republican
51	Eldon Johnson	Republican
52	Kip Lombard	Republican
53	Bernie Agrons	Democratic
54	Tom Throop	Democratic
55	Bill C. Bellamy	Democratic
56	Wayne H. Fawbush	Democratic
57	Bob Harper	Republican
58	Bob Brogoitti	Republican
59	Max Simpson	Democratic
60	Denny Jones	Republican
