= 63rd Oregon Legislative Assembly =

←	62nd Legislative Assembly	64th Legislative Assembly	→
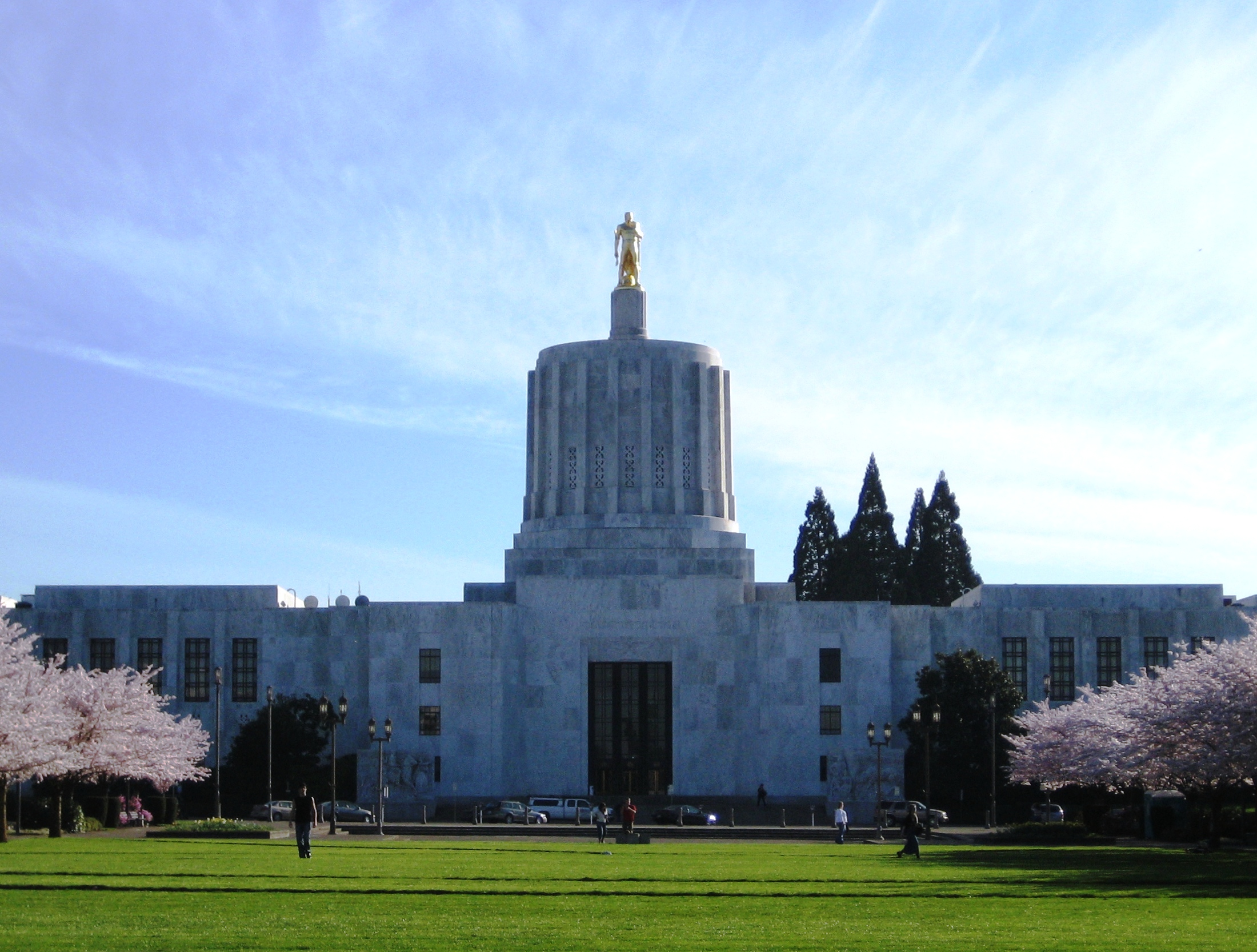
- The legislature took place in the Oregon State Capitol, seen here in 2007

Overview
- Legislative body: Oregon Legislative Assembly
- Jurisdiction: Oregon, United States
- Meeting place: Oregon State Capitol
- Term: 1985
- Website: www.oregonlegislature.gov

Oregon State Senate
- Members: 30 Senators
- Senate President: John Kitzhaber (D)
- Majority Leader: Steve Starkovich (D)
- Minority Leader: Tony Meeker (R)
- Party control: Democratic Party of Oregon

Oregon House of Representatives
- Members: 60 Representatives
- Speaker of the House: Vera Katz (D)
- Majority Leader: Shirley Gold (D)
- Minority Leader: Larry Campbell (R)
- Party control: Democratic Party of Oregon

The 63rd Oregon Legislative Assembly was the legislative session of the Oregon Legislative Assembly that convened on January 14, 1985, and adjourned June 21 the same year.

== Senate ==
Affiliation	Members
Democratic	18
Republican	12
Total	30
Government Majority	6

== Senate Members ==
Composition of the Senate
District	Senator	Party
1	Charles Hanlon	Democratic
2	John Brenneman	Republican
3	Nancy Wyly Ryles	Republican
4	James M. Simmons	Republican
5	Jeannette Hamby	Republican
6	Jan Wyers	Democratic
7	Rod Monroe	Democratic
8	William McCoy	Democratic
9	Frank L. Roberts	Democratic
10	Jane Cease	Democratic
11	Glenn E. Otto	Democratic
12	Walter F. Brown	Democratic
13	Joyce Cohen	Democratic
14	Steve Starkovich (Majority Leader)	Democratic
15	Tony Meeker (Minority Leader)	Republican
16	L. B. Day	Republican
17	Cub Houck	Republican
18	Clifford W. Trow	Democratic
19	Mae Yih	Democratic
20	Margie Hendriksen	Democratic
21	Edward Fadeley	Democratic
22	WIlliam Frye	Democratic
23	John Kitzhaber (President)	Democratic
24	Bill Bradbury	Democratic
25	Bill Olson	Republican
26	Lenn Lamar L. Hannon	Republican
27	Peter Marik Brockman	Republican
28	Kenneth Jernstedt	Republican
29	Mike Thorne	Democratic
30	Gene Timms	Republican

== House ==
Affiliation	Members
Democratic	34
Republican	26
Total	60
Government Majority	8

John Minnis was appointed on April 18, 1995, to fill the vacancy of Patrick Gillis, who was recalled on March 28, 1985.

== House Members ==
Composition of the House
District	House Member	Party
1	Bruce Hugo	Democratic
2	Tom Hanlon	Democratic
3	Paul Hanneman	Republican
4	Max C. Rijken	Democratic
5	Al Young	Democratic
6	Delna Jones	Republican
7	Ted L. Calouri	Republican
8	Mary Alice Ford	Republican
9	Paul Phillips	Republican
10	Vera Katz (Speaker)	Democratic
11	Thomas L. Mason	Democratic
12	Dick Springer	Democratic
13	Rick Bauman	Democratic
14	Shirley Gold (Majority Leader)	Democratic
15	Cindy Banzer	Democratic
16	Ron McCarty	Democratic
17	Mike Burton	Democratic
18	Margaret Carter	Democratic
19	Ronald Cease	Democratic
20	John Minnis, Patrick Gillis	Republican
21	Lonnie J. Roberts	Democratic
22	Rick Kotulski	Democratic
23	Robert R. Shiprack	Democratic
24	Randy Miller	Republican
25	Dave McTeague	Democratic
26	Robin Lindquist	Democratic
27	Darlene Hooley	Democratic
28	Fred Parkinson	Republican
29	Stan Bunn	Republican
30	Jeff Gilmour	Democratic
31	Jim Hill	Democratic
32	Chuck Sides	Republican
33	Michael J. Kopetski	Democratic
34	John Schoon	Republican
35	Tony Van Vliet	Republican
36	Mike McCracken	Democratic
37	Liz VanLeeuwen	Republican
38	Cedric Ross Hayden	Republican
39	Ron Eachus	Democratic
40	Carl Hosticka	Democratic
41	Mary Burrows	Republican
42	Larry Hill	Democratic
43	Larry Campbell (Minority Leader)	Republican
44	Peggy Jolin	Democratic
45	Andy Anderson	Republican
46	Bill Markham	Republican
47	Jim Whitty	Democratic
48	Walter G. Schroeder	Republican
49	George Trahern	Republican
50	Peter M. Tarzian	Democratic
51	Eldon Johnson	Republican
52	Nancy Peterson	Democratic
53	Bernie Agrons	Democratic
54	Tom Throop	Democratic
55	Bill C. Bellamy	Republican
56	Wayne H. Fawbush	Democratic
57	Robert Harper	Republican
58	Bob Brogoitti	Republican
59	Ray French	Republican
60	Denny Jones	Republican
