= 61st Oregon Legislative Assembly =

Term of state legislature in Oregon, US

←	60th Legislative Assembly	62nd Legislative Assembly	→
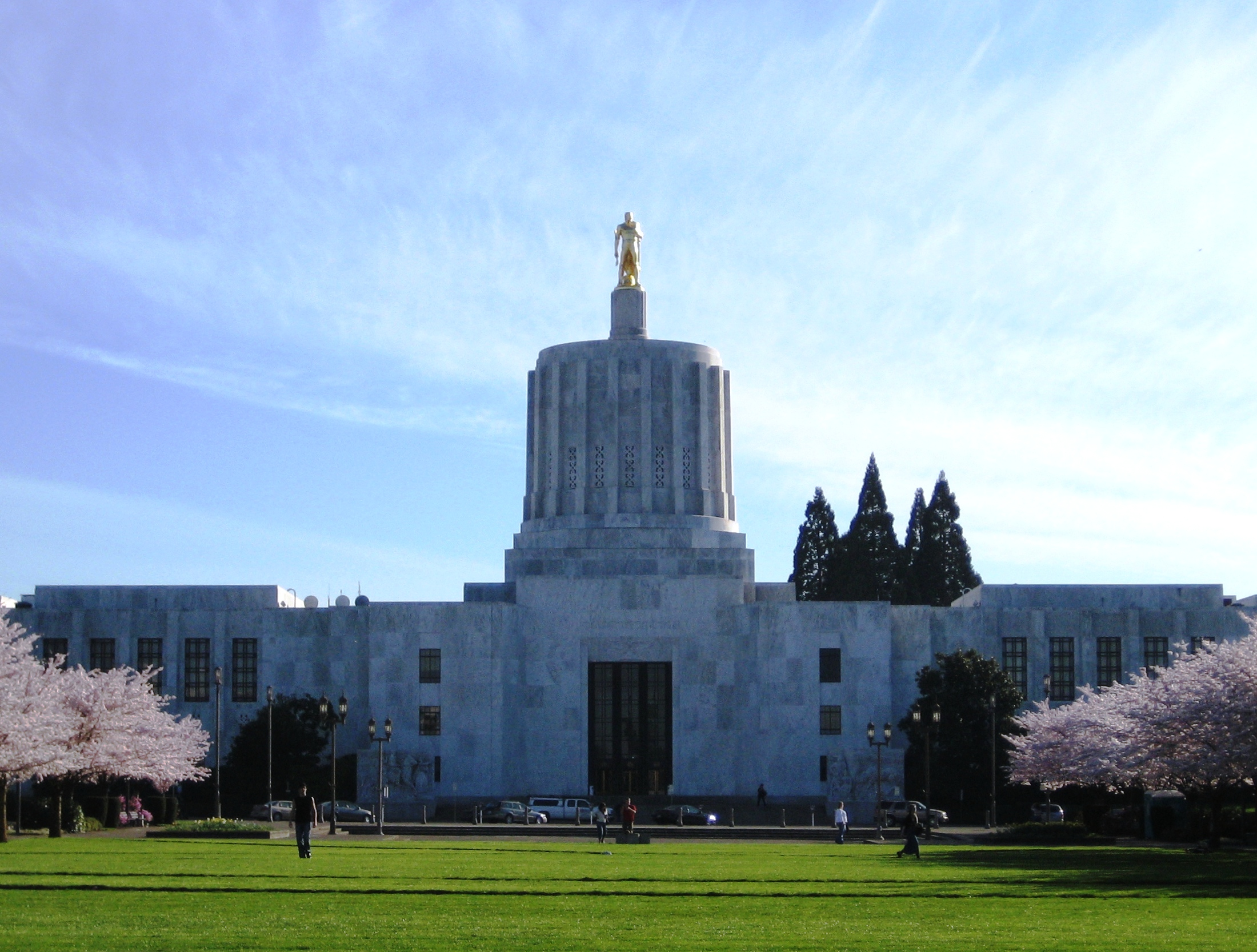
- The legislature took place in the Oregon State Capitol, seen here in 2007

Overview
- Legislative body: Oregon Legislative Assembly
- Jurisdiction: Oregon, United States
- Meeting place: Oregon State Capitol
- Term: 1981
- Website: www.oregonlegislature.gov

Oregon State Senate
- Members: 30 Senators
- Senate President: Fred W. Heard (D)
- Majority Leader: Dell Isham (D)
- Minority Leader: Robert F. Smith(R)
- Party control: Democratic Party of Oregon

Oregon House of Representatives
- Members: 60 Representatives
- Speaker of the House: Vern Meyer (R)
- Majority Leader: Grattan Kerans(D)
- Minority Leader: Paul Hanneman (R)
- Party control: Democratic Party of Oregon

The 61st Oregon Legislative Assembly was the legislative session of the Oregon Legislative Assembly that convened on January 12, 1981, and adjourned August 2, 1981.

== Senate ==
Affiliation	Members
Democratic	22
Republican	8
Total	30
Government Majority	14

== Senate Members ==
Composition of the Senate
District	Senator	Party
1	Charles Hanlon	Democratic
2	Dell Isham (Majority Leader)	Democratic
3	Tom Hartung	Republican
4	James M. Simmons	Republican
5	Ted Hallock	Democratic
6	Jan Wyers	Democratic
7	Rod Monroe	Democratic
8	William McCoy	Democratic
9	Frank L. Roberts	Democratic
10	Jim Gardner	Democratic
11	Richard Bullock	Democratic
12	Ruth McFarland	Democratic
13	Walter F. Brown	Democratic
14	Richard E. Groener	Democratic
15	Tony Meeker	Republican
16	L. B. Day	Republican
17	Keith A. Burbidge	Democratic
18	Clifford W. Trow	Democratic
19	John Powell	Democratic
20	George F. Wingard	Republican
21	Edward Fadeley	Democratic
22	Ted Kulongoski	Democratic
23	John Kitzhaber	Democratic
24	Jack Ripper	Democratic
25	Eugene "Debbs" Potts	Democratic
26	Lenn Lamar L. Hannon	Republican
27	Fred W. Heard (President)	Democratic
28	Kenneth Jernstedt	Republican
29	Michael G. Thorne	Democratic
30	Bob Smith (Minority Leader)	Republican

== House ==
Affiliation	Members
Democratic	33
Republican	27
Total	60
Government Majority	5

== House Members ==
Composition of the House
District	House Member	Party
1	Caroline P. Magruder	Democratic
2	Ted Bugas	Republican
3	Paul Hanneman (Minority Leader)	Republican
4	Jeannette Hamby	Republican
5	Nancy Ryles	Democratic
6	Mary Alice Ford	Republican
7	Norm Smith	Republican
8	Vera Katz	Democratic
9	Thomas L. Mason	Democratic
10	Dick Springer	Democratic
11	Rick Bauman	Democratic
12	Shirley Gold	Democratic
13	Gretchen Kafoury	Democratic
14	Howard Cease	Democratic
15	Jim Chrest	Democratic
16	Wally Priestley	Democratic
17	Barbara Roberts	Democratic
18	Jane Cease	Democratic
19	Hardy Myers	Democratic
20	Drew Davis	Democratic
21	Lonnie J. Roberts	Democratic
22	Annette Farmer	Democratic
23	Glenn E. Myers	Democratic
24	Joyce Cohen	Democratic
25	Glen Whallon	Democratic
26	Ed Lindquist	Democratic
27	Darlene Hooley	Democratic
28	Fred Parkinson	Republican
29	Bill Rutherford	Republican
30	Jeff Gilmour	Democratic
31	Alan C. Riebel	Republican
32	Donna B. Zajonc	Republican
33	Peter Courtney	Democratic
34	John Schoon	Republican
35	Tony Van Vliet	Republican
36	Mae Yih	Democratic
37	Liz VanLeeuwen	Republican
38	Max Rijken	Democratic
39	Grattan Kerans (Majority Leader)	Democratic
40	Margie Hendriksen	Democratic
41	Mary Burrows	Republican
42	Vern Meyer (Speaker)	Republican
43	Larry Campbell	Republican
44	Peggy Jolin	Democratic
45	Andy Anderson	Republican
46	Bill Markham	Republican
47	William Grannell	Democratic
48	Bill Bradbury	Democratic
49	George Trahern	Republican
50	Rebecca DeBoer	Republican
51	Eldon Johnson	Republican
52	Kip Lombard	Republican
53	Robert B. Kennedy	Republican
54	Tom Throop	Democratic
55	Bill C. Bellamy	Republican
56	Wayne H. Fawbush	Democratic
57	Bob Harper	Republican
58	Bob Brogoitti	Republican
59	Max Simpson	Democratic
60	Denny Jones	Republican
