= 60th Oregon Legislative Assembly =

←	59th Legislative Assembly	61st Legislative Assembly	→
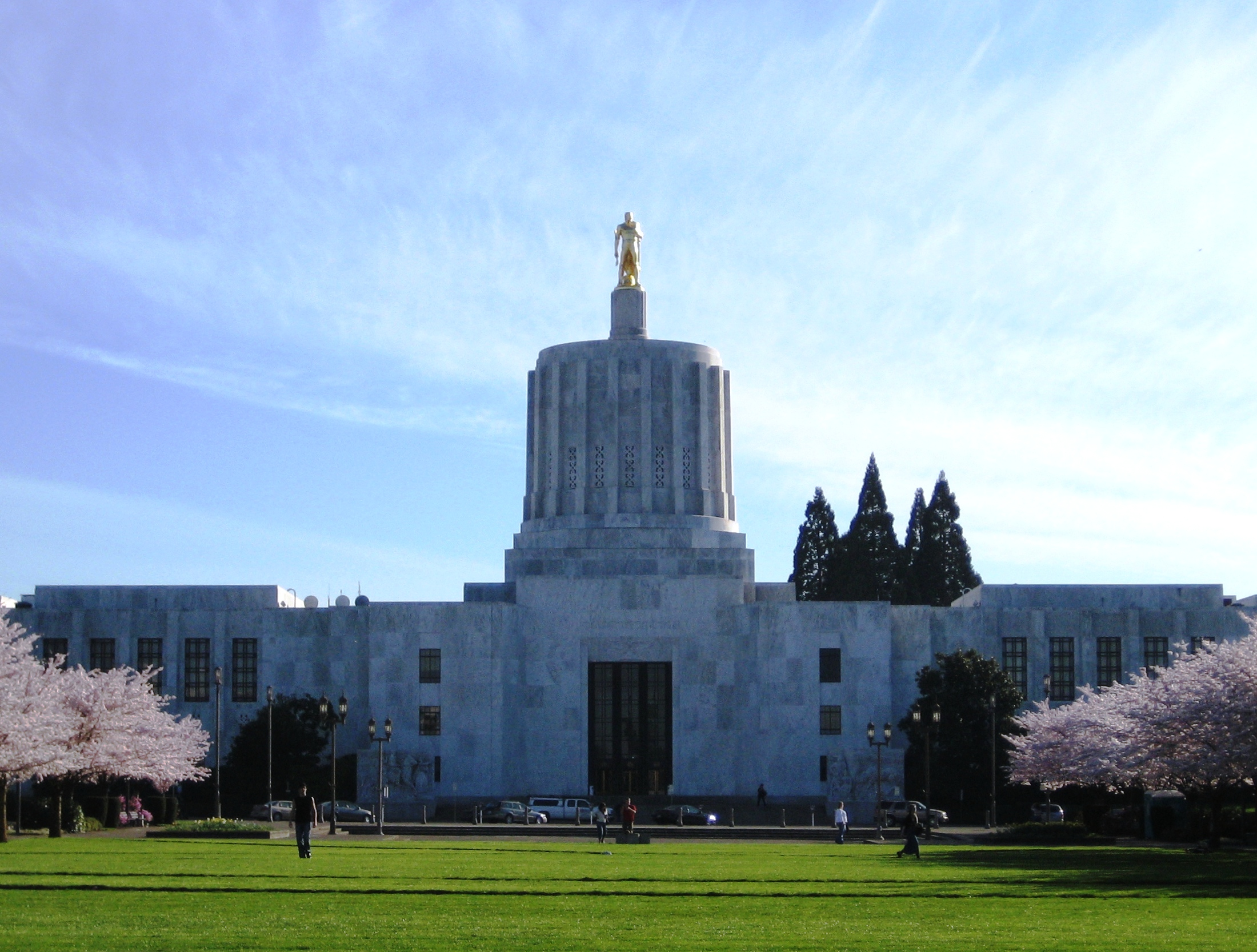
- The legislature took place in the Oregon State Capitol, seen here in 2007

Overview
- Legislative body: Oregon Legislative Assembly
- Jurisdiction: Oregon, United States
- Meeting place: Oregon State Capitol
- Term: 1979
- Website: www.oregonlegislature.gov

Oregon State Senate
- Members: 30 Senators
- Senate President: Jason Boe (D)
- Majority Leader: Fred W. Heard (D)
- Minority Leader: Robert Freeman Smith (R)
- Party control: Democratic Party of Oregon

Oregon House of Representatives
- Members: 60 Representatives
- Speaker of the House: Hardy Myers (D)
- Majority Leader: Grattan Kerans (D)
- Minority Leader: Gary Wilhelms (R)
- Party control: Democratic Party of Oregon

The 60th Oregon Legislative Assembly was the legislative session of the Oregon Legislative Assembly that convened on January 8, 1979, and adjourned July 4th the same year.

== Senate ==
Affiliation	Members
Democratic	23
Republican	7
Total	30
Government Majority	16

Mike Ragsdale resigned his House seat to fill the vacancy in the Senate created by the resignation of Victor Atiyeh.

== Senate Members ==
Composition of the Senate
District	Senator	Party
1	Charles Hanlon	Democratic
2	Dell Isham	Democratic
3	Tom Hartung	Republican
4	Mike Ragsdale	Republican
5	Ted Hallock	Democratic
6	Jan Wyers	Democratic
7	Stephen Kafoury	Democratic
8	William McCoy	Democratic
9	Frank L. Roberts	Democratic
10	Jim Gardner	Democratic
11	Richard Bullock	Democratic
12	Vern Cook	Democratic
13	Walter F. Brown	Democratic
14	Richard E. Groener	Democratic
15	Tony Meeker	Republican
16	L. B. Day	Republican
17	Keith A. Burbidge	Democratic
18	Clifford W. Trow	Democratic
19	John A. Powell	Democratic
20	George F. Wingard	Republican
21	Edward Fadeley	Democratic
22	Ted Kulongoski	Democratic
23	Jason Boe (President)	Democratic
24	Jack Ripper	Democratic
25	E. D. Potts	Democratic
26	Lenn Hannon	Democratic
27	Fred W. Heard (Majority Leader)	Democratic
28	Kenneth Jernstedt	Republican
29	Michael G. Thorne	Democratic
30	Bob Smith (Minority Leader)	Republican

== House ==
Affiliation	Members
Democratic	34
Republican	26
Total	60
Government Majority	8

Mary Alice Ford was appointed to the House seat vacated by Mike Ragsdale.

== House Members ==
Composition of the House
District	House Member	Party
1	Caroline Magruder	Democratic
2	Ted Bugas	Republican
3	Paul Hanneman	Republican
4	Mark Gardner	Democratic
5	Nancy Ryles	Republican
6	Mary Alice Ford, Mike Ragsdale	Republican
7	Norm Smith	Republican
8	Vera Katz	Democratic
9	Thomas L. Mason	Democratic
10	Josephine H. Simpson	Republican
11	Rick Bauman	Democratic
12	Rod Monroe	Democratic
13	Gretchen Kafoury	Democratic
14	Howard Cherry	Democratic
15	Jim Chrest	Democratic
16	Wally Priestley	Democratic
17	George Starr	Democratic
18	Jane Cease	Democratic
19	Hardy Myers (Speaker)	Democratic
20	Drew Davis	Democratic
21	Sue Pisha	Democratic
22	Sandy Richards	Democratic
23	Glenn E. Otto	Democratic
24	Joyce Cohen	Democratic
25	Glen W. Whallon	Democratic
26	Ed Lindquist	Democratic
27	Ted Achilles	Republican
28	Curtis Wolfer	Democratic
29	Bill Rutherford	Republican
30	Jeff Gilmour	Democratic
31	Alan C. Riebel	Republican
32	Donna B. Zajonc	Republican
33	Chick Edwards	Republican
34	John Schoon	Republican
35	Tony Van Vliet	Republican
36	Mae Yih	Democratic
37	Bud Byers	Democratic
38	Max C. Rijken	Democratic
39	Grattan Kerans (Majority Leader)	Democratic
40	David B. Frohnmayer	Republican
41	Mary Burrows	Republican
42	Nancie Fadeley	Democratic
43	Larry Campbell	Republican
44	Bill Rogers	Republican
45	John Kitzhaber	Democratic
46	Bill Markham	Republican
47	William Grannell	Democratic
48	Doc Stevenson	Democratic
49	Cecil L. Johnson	Republican
50	Clayton Klein	Democratic
51	Eldon Johnson	Republican
52	Kip Lombard	Republican
53	Gary Wilhelms (Minority Leader)	Republican
54	Tom Throop	Democratic
55	Bill Belamy	Republican
56	Wayne H. Fawbush	Democratic
57	Jack Duff	Republican
58	Bob Brogoitti	Republican
59	Max Simpson	Democratic
60	Denny Jones	Republican
