= 65th Oregon Legislative Assembly =

1989 Legislative Assembly in Oregon, USA

←	64th Legislative Assembly	66th Legislative Assembly	→
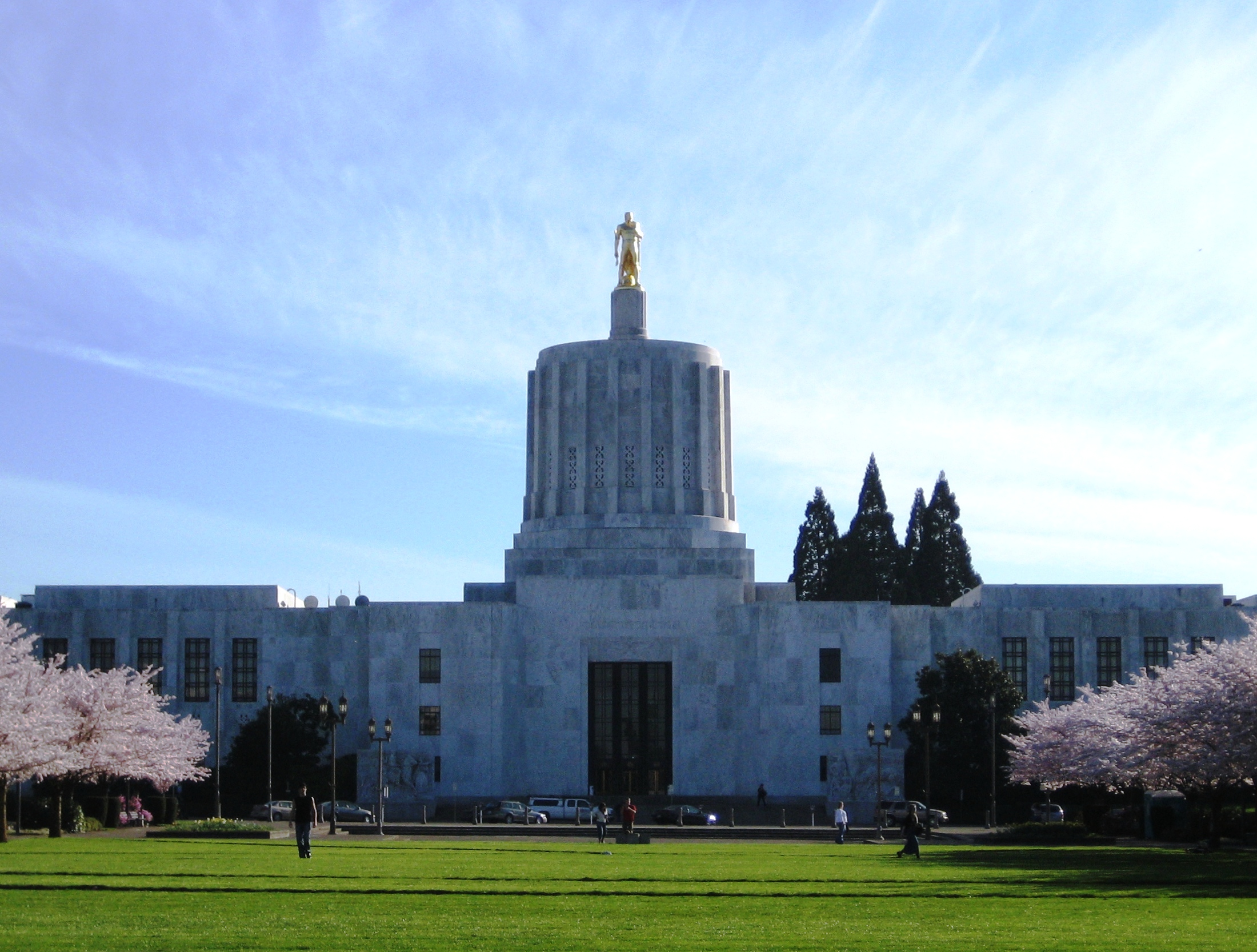
- The legislature took place in the Oregon State Capitol, seen here in 2007

Overview
- Legislative body: Oregon Legislative Assembly
- Jurisdiction: Oregon, United States
- Meeting place: Oregon State Capitol
- Term: 1989
- Website: www.oregonlegislature.gov

Oregon State Senate
- Members: 30 Senators
- Senate President: John Kitzhaber (D)
- Majority Leader: Bill Bradbury (D)
- Minority Leader: Cub Houck (R)
- Party control: Democratic Party of Oregon

Oregon House of Representatives
- Members: 60 Representatives
- Speaker of the House: Vera Katz (D)
- Majority Leader: David Dix (D)
- Minority Leader: Larry Campbell (R)
- Party control: Democratic Party of Oregon

The 65th Oregon Legislative Assembly was the legislative session of the Oregon Legislative Assembly that convened on January 9 and adjourned July 4, 1989.

== Senate ==
Affiliation	Members
Democratic	19
Republican	11
Total	30
Government Majority	8

Composition of the Senate
District	Senator	Party
1	Joan Dukes	Democratic
2	John Brenneman	Republican
3	Robert C. Shoemaker	Democratic
4	Paul Phillips	Republican
5	Jeannette Hamby	Republican
6	Richard Samuel Springer	Democratic
7	Shirley Gold	Democratic
8	Bill McCoy	Democratic
9	Frank L. Roberts	Democratic
10	Jane Cease	Democratic
11	Glenn E. Otto	Democratic
12	Bill Kennemer	Republican
13	Joyce Cohen	Democratic
14	Bob Kintigh	Republican
15	Jim Bunn	Republican
16	Jim Hill	Democratic
17	Cub Houck (Minority Leader)	Republican
18	Clifford W. Trow	Democratic
19	Mae Yih	Democratic
20	Grattan Kerans	Democratic
21	Larry Hill	Democratic
22	Peggy Jolin	Democratic
23	John Kitzhaber (President)	Democratic
24	Bill Bradbury (Majority Leader)	Democratic
25	Ronald D. Grensky	Republican
26	Lenn Lamar L. Hannon	Republican
27	Peter Marik Brockman	Republican
28	Wayne H. Fawbush	Democratic
29	Mike Thorne	Democratic
30	Gene Timms	Republican

== House ==
Affiliation	Members
Democratic	32
Republican	28
Total	60
Government Majority	4

Phil Keisling resigned on January 14, 1991 George Trahern resigned in March 1988, and Bob Repine was appointed in May 1988 to fill the vacancy.

Composition of the House
District	House Member	Party
1	Bruce Hugo	Democratic
2	Tom Hanlon	Democratic
3	Paul Hanneman	Republican
4	Hedy Rijken	Democratic
5	Al Young	Democratic
6	Delna Jones	Republican
7	Ted Calouri	Republican
8	Mary Alice Ford	Republican
9	Tom Brian	Democratic
10	Vera Katz (Speaker)	Democratic
11	Thomas L. Mason	Democratic
12	Phil Keisling	Democratic
13	Judith C. Bauman	Democratic
14	Beverly Stein	Democratic
15	Gene Sayler	Republican
16	Rodger Wehage	Republican
17	Mike Burton	Democratic
18	Margaret Carter	Democratic
19	Ron Cease	Democratic
20	John Minnis	Republican
21	Lonnie J. Roberts	Democratic
22	Rick Kotulski	Democratic
23	Robert R. Shiprack	Democratic
24	Randy Miller	Republican
25	Dave McTeague	Democratic
26	Larry Sowa	Democratic
27	Wayne Clark Jr.	Republican
28	Fred Parkinson	Republican
29	Stan Bunn	Republican
30	Jeff Gilmour	Democratic
31	Gene Derfler	Republican
32	Kevin Mannix	Democratic
33	Peter Courtney	Democratic
34	John Schoon	Republican
35	Tony Van Vliet	Republican
36	Carolyn Oakley	Republican
37	Liz VanLeeuwen	Republican
38	Cedric Hayden	Republican
39	Jim Edmunson	Democratic
40	Carl Hosticka	Democratic
41	David Dix (Majority Leader)	Democratic
42	WIlliam J. Dwyer	Democratic
43	Larry Campbell (Minority Leader)	Republican
44	Samuel L. Dominy	Democratic
45	Norm Gershon	Democratic
46	Bill Markham	Republican
47	James Whitty	Democratic
48	Walter G. Schroeder	Republican
49	Bob Repine, George Trahern	Republican
50	Ernie Calhoon	Democratic
51	Eldon Johnson	Republican
52	Nancy Peterson	Democratic
53	Bernie Agrons	Democratic
54	Bob Pickard	Republican
55	Bev Clarno	Republican
56	Greg Walden	Republican
57	Charles R. Norris	Republican
58	Ray Baum	Republican
59	Michael Nelson	Democratic
60	Denny Jones	Republican
