= 64th Oregon Legislative Assembly =

| ← | 63rd Legislative Assembly | 65th Legislative Assembly | → |
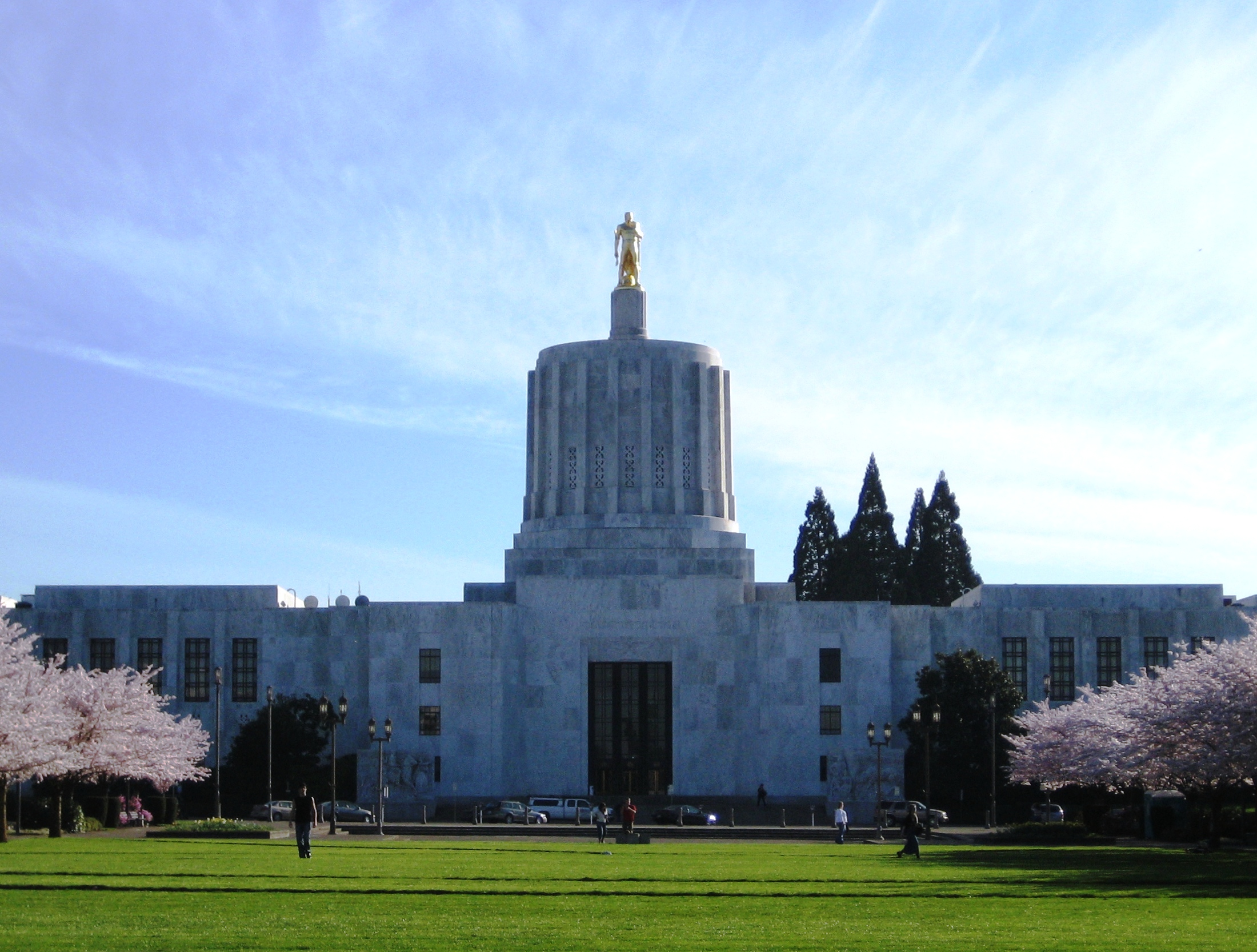
- The legislature took place in the Oregon State Capitol, seen here in 2007

Overview
- Legislative body: Oregon Legislative Assembly
- Jurisdiction: Oregon, United States
- Meeting place: Oregon State Capitol
- Term: 1987–1988

Oregon State Senate
- Members: 30 Senators
- Senate President: John Kitzhaber
- Majority Leader: Bill Bradbury
- Minority Leader: Tony Meeker
- Party control: Democratic Party

Oregon House of Representatives
- Members: 60 Representatives
- Speaker of the House: Vera Katz
- Party control: Democratic Party

The Sixty-Fourth Oregon Legislative Assembly convened for its regular session from January 12 to June 28, 1987, a total of 168 days.

Both chambers were controlled by the Democratic Party of Oregon. The House speaker was Vera Katz (D–10 Portland), and the Senate president was John Kitzhaber (D–23 Roseburg).

Democrat Neil Goldschmidt was governor of Oregon during the 64th legislature.

== Senate ==
| Affiliation | Members |
|---|---|
| Democratic | 17 |
| Republican | 13 |
| Total | 30 |
| Government Majority | 4 |

== House ==
| Affiliation | Members |
|---|---|
| Democratic | 31 |
| Republican | 29 |
| Total | 60 |
| Government Majority | 2 |

| District | Representative | Residence | Counties | Party |
|---|---|---|---|---|
| 1 | Bruce Hugo | Scappoose | Columbia, Washington | Democratic |
| 2 | Tom Hanlon | Cannon Beach | Clatsop, Columbia, Washington | Democratic |
| 3 | Paul Hanneman | Cloverdale | Tillamook, Lincoln, Polk, Washington, Yamhill | Republican |
| 4 | Don Butsch | Newport | Benton, Lane, Lincoln | Republican |
| 5 | Al Young | Hillsboro | Washington | Democratic |
| 6 | Delna Jones | Aloha | Washington | Republican |
| 7 | Ted L. Calouri | Beaverton | Washington | Republican |
| 8 | Mary Alice Ford | Portland | Washington | Republican |
| 9 | Paul Phillips | Tigard | Washington | Republican |
| 10 | Vera Katz | Portland | Multnomah | Democratic |
| 11 | Tom L. Mason | Portland | Multnomah | Democratic |
| 12 | Richard S. Springer | Portland | Multnomah | Democratic |
| 13 | Judy Bauman | Portland | Multnomah | Democratic |
| 14 | Shirley Gold | Portland | Multnomah | Democratic |
| 15 | Gene Sayler | Portland | Multnomah | Republican |
| 16 | Ron McCarty | Portland | Multnomah | Democratic |
| 17 | Mike Burton | Portland | Multnomah | Democratic |
| 18 | Margaret Carter | Portland | Multnomah | Democratic |
| 19 | Ron Cease | Portland | Multnomah | Democratic |
| 20 | John Minnis | Portland | Multnomah | Republican |
| 21 | Lonnie J. Roberts | Portland | Multnomah | Democratic |
| 22 | Rick Kotulski | Corbett | Multnomah, Clackamas | Democratic |
| 23 | Robert R. Shiprack | Beavercreek | Clackamas | Democratic |
| 24 | Randy Miller | Lake Oswego | Clackamas | Republican |
| 25 | Dave McTeague | Milwaukie | Clackamas | Democratic |
| 26 | Larry Sowa | Oregon City | Clackamas | Democratic |
| 27 | Darlene Hooley ^{1} | West Linn | Clackamas, Washington | Democratic |
| 27 | Judie Hammerstad ^{1} | Lake Oswego | Clackamas, Washington | Democratic |
| 28 | Fred Parkinson | Silverton | Marion | Republican |
| 29 | Stan Bunn | Dayton | Marion, Yamhill | Republican |
| 30 | Jeff Gilmour | Jefferson | Marion, Linn | Democratic |
| 31 | Rocky Barilla | Salem | Marion, Polk | Democratic |
| 32 | Charles A. Sides | Salem | Marion | Republican |
| 33 | Michael J. Kopetski | Keizer | Marion, Polk | Democratic |
| 34 | John Schoon | Rickreall | Benton, Polk | Republican |
| 35 | Tony Van Vliet | Corvallis | Benton | Republican |
| 36 | Mike McCracken | Albany | Linn, Benton | Democratic |
| 37 | Liz VanLeeuwen | Halsey | Linn | Republican |
| 38 | Cedric Hayden | Fall Creek | Clackamas, Lane, Linn, Marion | Republican |
| 39 | Ron Eachus ^{2} | Eugene | Lane | Democratic |
| 39 | Jim Edmunson ^{2} | Eugene | Lane | Democratic |
| 40 | Carl Hosticka | Eugene | Lane | Democratic |
| 41 | David Dix | Eugene | Lane | Democratic |
| 42 | Bill Dwyer | Springfield | Lane | Democratic |
| 43 | Larry Campbell | Eugene | Lane, Douglas | Republican |
| 44 | Peg L. Jolin | Cottage Grove | Lane, Douglas | Democratic |
| 45 | Verner Anderson | Roseburg | Douglas | Republican |
| 46 | Bill Markham | Riddle | Douglas, Jackson | Republican |
| 47 | Jim Whitty | Coos Bay | Douglas, Coos | Democratic |
| 48 | Walter G. Schroeder | Gold Beach | Curry, Coos | Republican |
| 49 | George Trahern ^{3} | Grants Pass | Josephine | Republican |
| 49 | Bob Repine ^{3} | Grants Pass | Josephine | Republican |
| 50 | George Gilman | Central Point | Jackson | Republican |
| 51 | Eldon Johnson | Medford | Jackson, Josephine | Republican |
| 52 | Nancy D. Peterson | Ashland | Jackson | Democratic |
| 53 | Bernie Agrons | Klamath Falls | Klamath | Democratic |
| 54 | Bob Pickard | Bend | Klamath, Deschutes | Republican |
| 55 | Bill C. Bellamy | Culver | Jefferson, Deschutes | Republican |
| 56 | Wayne H. Fawbush | Hood River | Gilliam, Wasco, Hood River, Sherman, Wheeler | Democratic |
| 57 | Charles R. Norris | Hermiston | Umatilla | Republican |
| 58 | Robert A. Brogoitti | La Grande | Union, Wallowa | Republican |
| 59 | Ray French | Heppner | Baker, Crook, Grant, Morrow | Republican |
| 60 | Denny Jones | Ontario | Harney, Lake, Malheur | Republican |

^{1} Darlene Hooley resigned April 24, 1987 to accept appointment to the Washington County Board of Commissioners. Judie Hammerstad was appointed April 28, 1987 to fill the vacancy.

^{2} Ron Eachus resigned October 8, 1987 to accept appointment as Public Utility Commissioner. Jim Edmunson was appointed November 4, 1987 to fill the vacancy.

^{3} George Trahern resigned his House seat to accept appointment to the Senate in March 1988. Bob Repine was appointed to fill the vacancy.

== See also ==
- List of Oregon ballot measures#1987
