= 59th Oregon Legislative Assembly =

| ← | 58th Legislative Assembly | 60th Legislative Assembly | → |
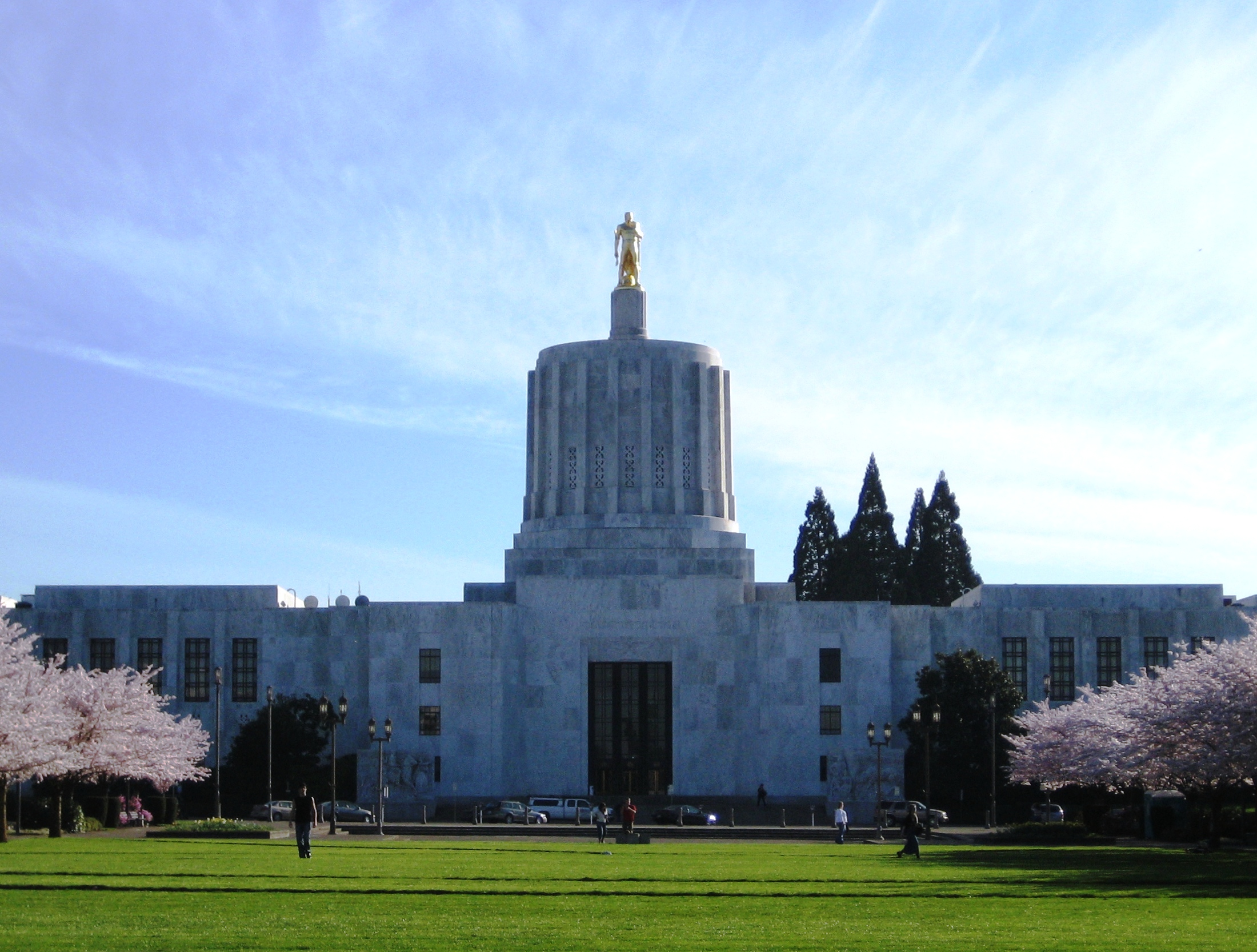
- The legislature took place in the Oregon State Capitol, seen here in 2007

Overview
- Legislative body: Oregon Legislative Assembly
- Jurisdiction: Oregon, United States
- Meeting place: Oregon State Capitol
- Term: 1977
- Website: www.oregonlegislature.gov

Oregon State Senate
- Members: 30 Senators
- Senate President: Jason Boe (D)
- Majority Leader: Fred W. Heard (D)
- Minority Leader: Victor Atiyeh (R)
- Party control: Democratic Party of Oregon

Oregon House of Representatives
- Members: 60 Representatives
- Speaker of the House: Phil Lang (D)
- Majority Leader: Ed Lindquist (D)
- Minority Leader: Roger E. Martin (R)
- Party control: Democratic Party of Oregon

The 59th Oregon Legislative Assembly was the legislative session of the Oregon Legislative Assembly that convened on January 10, 1977, and adjourned July 5, 1977.

== Senate ==
| Affiliation | Members |
|---|---|
| Democratic | 24 |
| Republican | 6 |
| Total | 30 |
| Government Majority | 18 |

Elizabeth W. Browne resigned on July 5, 1977. Ted Kulongoski was appointed in her place on August 2, 1977. Wallace P. Carson Jr. resigned on October 21, 1977. L. B. Day was appointed in his place on November 10, 1977. Betty Roberts resigned September 1, 1977. Raul Soto-Seelig was appointed in her place on September 26, 1977.

=== Members ===
Composition of the Senate
| District | Senator | Party |
|---|---|---|
| 1 | Charles Hanlon | Democratic |
| 2 | Dell Isham | Democratic |
| 3 | Blaine Whipple | Democratic |
| 4 | Victor Atiyeh (Minority Leader) | Republican |
| 5 | Ted Hallock | Democratic |
| 6 | Jan Wyers | Democratic |
| 7 | Stephen Kafoury | Democratic |
| 8 | William McCoy | Democratic |
| 9 | Frank L. Roberts | Democratic |
| 10 | Betty Roberts, Raul Soto-Seelig | Democratic |
| 11 | Mary Wendy Roberts | Democratic |
| 12 | Vern Cook | Democratic |
| 13 | Walter F. Brown | Democratic |
| 14 | Richard E. Groener | Democratic |
| 15 | Anthony Meeker | Republican |
| 16 | Wallace P. Carson Jr., L. B. Day | Republican |
| 17 | Keith A. Burbridge | Democratic |
| 18 | Clifford W. Trow | Democratic |
| 19 | John A. Powell | Democratic |
| 20 | George F. Wingard | Republican |
| 21 | Edward Fadeley | Democratic |
| 22 | Elizabeth W. Browne, Ted Kulongoski | Democratic |
| 23 | Jason Boe (President) | Democratic |
| 24 | Jack Ripper | Democratic |
| 25 | Eugene "Debbs" Potts | Democratic |
| 26 | Lenn Hannon | Democratic |
| 27 | Fred W. Heard (Majority Leader) | Democratic |
| 28 | Kenneth Jernstedt | Republican |
| 29 | Michael G. Thorne | Democratic |
| 30 | Bob Smith | Republican |

== House ==
| Affiliation | Members |
|---|---|
| Democratic | 37 |
| Republican | 23 |
| Total | 60 |
| Government Majority | 14 |

Theodore Kulongoski resigned on August 2, 1977. Clinton Boehringer was appointed on September 6, 1977, to fill the vacancy. Brad Morris resigned on July 31, 1977. Eldon Johnson was appointed on September 6, 1977, to fill the vacancy.

=== Members ===
Composition of the House
| District | House Member | Party |
|---|---|---|
| 1 | Dick Magruder | Democratic |
| 2 | Ted Bugas | Republican |
| 3 | Paul Hanneman | Republican |
| 4 | Mark Gardner | Democratic |
| 5 | Tom Marsh | Democratic |
| 6 | Mike Ragsdale | Republican |
| 7 | Pat Whiting | Democratic |
| 8 | Vera Katz | Democratic |
| 9 | Mary W. Rieke | Republican |
| 10 | Phil Lang (Speaker) | Democratic |
| 11 | Earl Blumenauer | Democratic |
| 12 | Rod Monroe | Democratic |
| 13 | Gretchen Kafoury | Democratic |
| 14 | Howard Cherry | Democratic |
| 15 | Jim Chrest | Democratic |
| 16 | Wally Priestly | Democratic |
| 17 | George W. Starr | Democratic |
| 18 | Lloyd C. Kinsey | Republican |
| 19 | Hardy Myers | Democratic |
| 20 | Drew Davis | Democratic |
| 21 | Richard Gustafson | Democratic |
| 22 | Sandra L. Richards | Democratic |
| 23 | Glenn E. Otto | Democratic |
| 24 | Roger E. Martin (Minority Leader) | Republican |
| 25 | Glen W. Whallon | Democratic |
| 26 | Ed Lindquist (Majority Leader) | Democratic |
| 27 | Ted Achilles | Republican |
| 28 | Curt Wolfer | Democratic |
| 29 | Bill Rutherford | Republican |
| 30 | Jeff Gilmour | Democratic |
| 31 | Alan C. Riebel | Republican |
| 32 | Peg Dereli | Democratic |
| 33 | Bob Vian | Democratic |
| 34 | Bob Marx | Democratic |
| 35 | Tony Van Vliet | Republican |
| 36 | Mae Yih | Democratic |
| 37 | Bud Byers | Democratic |
| 38 | Max C. Rijken | Democratic |
| 39 | Grattan Kerans | Democratic |
| 40 | David B. Frohnmayer | Republican |
| 41 | Mary Burrows | Republican |
| 42 | Nancie Fadeley | Democratic |
| 43 | Clinton Boehringer, Ted Kulongoski | Democratic |
| 44 | Bill Rogers | Republican |
| 45 | Al Shaw | Republican |
| 46 | Bill Markham | Republican |
| 47 | William Grannell | Democratic |
| 48 | Edward Stevenson | Democratic |
| 49 | Cecil L. Johnson | Republican |
| 50 | Clayton Klein | Democratic |
| 51 | Eldon Johnson, Brad Morris | Republican |
| 52 | Kip Lombard | Republican |
| 53 | Gary Wilhelms | Republican |
| 54 | Samuel S. Johnson | Republican |
| 55 | Jack Sumner | Democratic |
| 56 | Wayne H. Fawbush | Democratic |
| 57 | Jack Duff | Republican |
| 58 | Robert A. Brogoitti | Republican |
| 59 | Max Simpson | Democratic |
| 60 | Denny Jones | Republican |
