= 1974 Oregon State Senate election =

- November 5, 1974

15 of 30 seats in the Oregon State Senate 16 seats needed for a majority
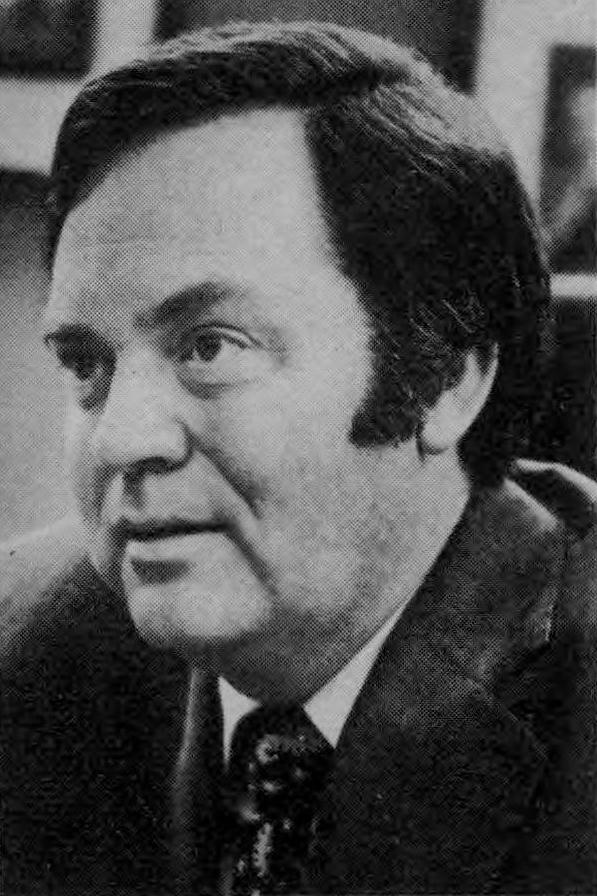

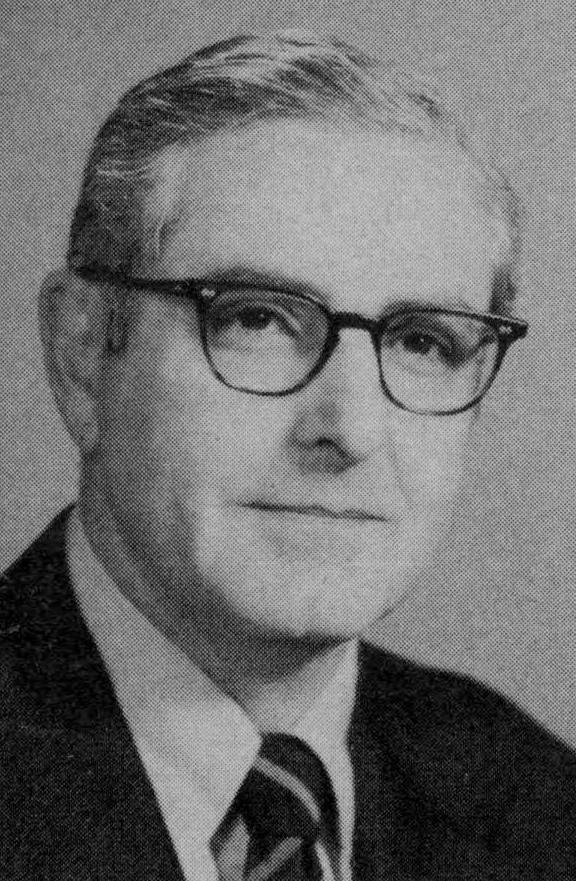
	Majority party	Minority party
Leader	Jason Boe	Victor Atiyeh
Party	Democratic	Republican
Leader's seat	23rd district	4th district
Seats before	18	12
Seats won	12	2
Seats after	21	8
Popular vote	212,088	125,660
Percentage	59.13%	35.04%
	Third party
Party	Independent
Seats before	0
Seats won	1
Seats after	1
Popular vote	20,745
Percentage	5.78%
- Results by party Democratic gain Democratic hold Republican hold Independent gain No election
Senate President before election
Jason Boe
Democratic
Elected Senate President
Jason Boe
Democratic

Elections to the Oregon State Senate were held on November 5, 1974, to elect 15 candidates to the 30-member Senate to serve four-year terms. In the wake of the Watergate scandal, the Democratic Party won 12 seats to the Republicans' 2, resulting in a Senate composition of 21 Democrats and 8 Republicans, with a net gain of 3 for the Democrats. The remaining seat was won by independent Charles Hanlon, unseating Democrat Bill Holmstrom in District 1 in an upset.

At the opening of the 1975 Legislature on January 13, Democrat Jason Boe was re-elected Senate President with the support of all Democrats and Hanlon. On June 25, 1976, long after the Legislature's adjournment, Hanlon announced he would join the Democrats for the remainder on his term.

This election used the same district boundaries used for the 1970 general elections passed after the 1970 U.S. census, electing all legislators in single-member districts with plurality voting. Each Senate district had two House districts nested within them.

== Summary ==
Partisan makeup following the 1972 election
Republican
Democratic

Partisan makeup following the 1974 election
Republican
Democratic
Independent

== District 1 ==
Senate District 1 contained all of Clatsop and Columbia counties, and parts of Washington County. Democratic incumbent Bill Holmstrom lost re-election to independent Charles Hanlon, who would later switch to the Democratic Party in June 1976.

District 1 Democratic primary election
Party	Candidate	Votes	%
Democratic	Bill Holmstrom (incumbent)	6,094	53.31%
Democratic	Raymond E. Steward	5,293	46.30%
Write-in		44	0.38%
Total votes		11,431	100.00%

District 1 Republican primary election
Party	Candidate	Votes	%
Write-in	Bill Holmstrom (incumbent)	246	36.07%
Write-in	Nate Smiley	242	35.48%
Write-in	Raymond E. Steward	133	19.50%
Write-in		61	8.94%
Total votes		682	100.00%

District 1 election
Party	Candidate	Votes	%
Independent	Charles Hanlon	12,597	51.60%
Democratic	Bill Holmstrom (incumbent)	11,795	48.31%
Write-in		22	0.09%
Total votes		24,414	100.00%
Independent gain from Democratic			

== District 3 ==
Senate District 3 contained parts of Washington County. Republican incumbent Tom Hartung lost re-election to Democrat Blaine Whipple.

District 3 Democratic primary election
Party	Candidate	Votes	%
Democratic	Blaine Whipple	4,695	53.56%
Democratic	Bill Hamilton	4,070	46.43%
Write-in		1	0.01%
Total votes		8,766	100.00%

District 3 Republican primary election
Party	Candidate	Votes	%
Republican	Tom Hartung (incumbent)	8,440	99.92%
Write-in		7	0.08%
Total votes		8,447	100.00%

District 3 election
Party	Candidate	Votes	%
Democratic	Blaine Whipple	13,640	50.55%
Republican	Tom Hartung (incumbent)	13,346	49.44%
Write-in		2	0.01%
Total votes		26,988	100.00%
Democratic gain from Republican			

== District 5 ==
Senate District 5 contained parts of Multnomah County. Democratic incumbent Ted Hallock won re-election.

District 5 Democratic primary election
Party	Candidate	Votes	%
Democratic	Ted Hallock (incumbent)	6,781	67.03%
Democratic	Ron Campbell	2,334	23.07%
Democratic	John H. Sweeney	1,001	9.89%
Write-in		1	0.01%
Total votes		10,117	100.00%

District 5 Republican primary election
Party	Candidate	Votes	%
Republican	Craig Berkman	8,312	99.70%
Write-in		25	0.30%
Total votes		8,337	100.00%

District 5 election
Party	Candidate	Votes	%
Democratic	Ted Hallock (incumbent)	15,003	53.15%
Republican	Craig Berkman	13,213	46.81%
Write-in		12	0.04%
Total votes		28,228	100.00%

== District 9 ==
Senate District 9 contained parts of Multnomah County. Democratic incumbent Tom Mahoney retired, and Democrat Frank Roberts won the open seat.

District 9 Democratic primary election
Party	Candidate	Votes	%
Democratic	Frank Roberts	5,424	47.65%
Democratic	John Toran	3,898	34.24%
Democratic	Irvin Franklin Parker	2,060	18.10%
Write-in		1	0.01%
Total votes		11,383	100.00%

District 9 Republican primary election
Party	Candidate	Votes	%
Republican	Raymond D. Conkling	4,428	99.75%
Write-in		11	0.25%
Total votes		4,439	100.00%

District 9 election
Party	Candidate	Votes	%
Democratic	Frank Roberts	15,168	70.07%
Republican	Raymond D. Conkling	6,472	29.91%
Write-in		3	0.01%
Total votes		21,643	100.00%
Democratic hold			

== District 11 ==
Senate District 11 contained parts of Multnomah County. Democratic incumbent John D. Burns retired, and Democrat Mary Roberts won the open seat.

District 11 Democratic primary election
Party	Candidate	Votes	%
Democratic	Mary Roberts	6,405	62.86%
Democratic	Lonnie Roberts	3,063	30.06%
Democratic	Helen M. Zimmerman	721	7.08%
Write-in		1	0.01%
Total votes		10,190	100.00%

District 11 Republican primary election
Party	Candidate	Votes	%
Write-in	Mary Roberts	21	44.68%
Write-in		26	55.32%
Total votes		47	100.00%

District 11 election
Party	Candidate	Votes	%
Democratic	Mary Roberts	15,162	99.80%
Write-in		31	0.20%
Total votes		15,193	100.00%
Democratic hold			

== District 13 ==
Senate District 13 contained parts of Clackamas County. Republican incumbent George Eivers lost re-election to Democrat Walt F. Brown.

District 13 Democratic primary election
Party	Candidate	Votes	%
Democratic	Walt F. Brown	5,390	55.11%
Democratic	Bill Admire	3,017	30.85%
Democratic	Bob Klemson	1,368	13.99%
Write-in		5	0.05%
Total votes		9,780	100.00%

District 13 Republican primary election
Party	Candidate	Votes	%
Republican	George Eivers (incumbent)	7,540	99.96%
Write-in		3	0.04%
Total votes		7,543	100.00%

District 13 election
Party	Candidate	Votes	%
Democratic	Walt F. Brown	16,188	58.36%
Republican	George Eivers (incumbent)	11,545	41.63%
Write-in		1	0.00%
Total votes		27,734	100.00%
Democratic gain from Republican			

== District 14 ==
Senate District 14 contained parts of Clackamas County. In early September, Republican nominee Pat Kelsh withdrew her name from the general election ballot, with Republicans not nominating a replacement. Democratic incumbent Dick Groener won re-election.

District 14 Democratic primary election
Party	Candidate	Votes	%
Democratic	Dick Groener (incumbent)	9,527	99.92%
Write-in		8	0.08%
Total votes		9,535	100.00%

District 14 Republican primary election
Party	Candidate	Votes	%
Republican	Pat Kelsh	6,112	99.92%
Write-in		5	0.08%
Total votes		6,117	100.00%

District 14 election
Party	Candidate	Votes	%
Democratic	Dick Groener (incumbent)	18,410	69.28%
Independent	Norm Stewart	8,148	30.67%
Write-in		3	0.01%
Total votes		26,561	100.00%

== District 16 ==
Senate District 16 contained parts of Linn and Marion counties. Republican incumbent Wallace P. Carson Jr. won re-election.

District 16 Democratic primary election
Party	Candidate	Votes	%
Democratic	Julius Gehring	4,763	59.31%
Democratic	Jean Rhodus	3,263	40.63%
Write-in		5	0.06%
Total votes		8,031	100.00%

District 16 Republican primary election
Party	Candidate	Votes	%
Republican	Wallace P. Carson Jr. (incumbent)	8,330	99.94%
Write-in		5	0.06%
Total votes		8,335	100.00%

District 16 election
Party	Candidate	Votes	%
Republican	Wallace P. Carson Jr. (incumbent)	13,876	59.01%
Democratic	Julius Gehring	9,640	40.99%
Total votes		23,516	100.00%

== District 17 ==
Senate District 17 contained parts of Marion and Polk counties. Democratic incumbent Keith A. Burbidge won re-election.

District 17 Democratic primary election
Party	Candidate	Votes	%
Democratic	Keith A. Burbidge (incumbent)	5,714	59.07%
Democratic	Martin Wolfer	3,958	40.91%
Write-in		2	0.02%
Total votes		9,674	100.00%

District 17 Republican primary election
Party	Candidate	Votes	%
Republican	Al Miller	6,559	99.61%
Write-in		26	0.39%
Total votes		6,585	100.00%

District 17 election
Party	Candidate	Votes	%
Democratic	Keith A. Burbidge (incumbent)	14,499	62.74%
Republican	Al Miller	8,609	37.25%
Write-in		1	0.00%
Total votes		23,109	100.00%

== District 18 ==
Senate District 18 contained parts of Benton and Polk counties. Republican incumbent Dick Hoyt retired, and Democrat Clifford W. Trow won the open seat.

District 18 Democratic primary election
Party	Candidate	Votes	%
Democratic	Clifford W. Trow	3,410	46.65%
Democratic	Pam Tupper	2,325	31.81%
Democratic	Larry Bauer	829	11.34%
Democratic	Rani Rigor	743	10.17%
Write-in		2	0.03%
Total votes		7,309	100.00%

District 18 Republican primary election
Party	Candidate	Votes	%
Republican	Gene M. Lear	6,340	99.97%
Write-in		2	0.03%
Total votes		6,342	100.00%

District 18 election
Party	Candidate	Votes	%
Democratic	Clifford W. Trow	13,359	56.41%
Republican	Gene M. Lear	10,319	43.58%
Write-in		2	0.01%
Total votes		23,680	100.00%
Democratic gain from Republican			

== District 19 ==
Senate District 19 contained parts of Benton and Linn counties. Republican incumbent Hector Macpherson Jr. lost re-election to Democrat John Powell

District 19 Democratic primary election
Party	Candidate	Votes	%
Democratic	John Powell	4,211	53.41%
Democratic	Glenn Huston	3,670	46.54%
Write-in		4	0.05%
Total votes		7,885	100.00%

District 19 Republican primary election
Party	Candidate	Votes	%
Republican	Hector Macpherson Jr. (incumbent)	5,858	98.55%
Write-in		86	1.45%
Total votes		5,944	100.00%

District 19 election
Party	Candidate	Votes	%
Democratic	John Powell	12,417	54.74%
Republican	Hector Macpherson Jr. (incumbent)	10,270	45.25%
Write-in		3	0.01%
Total votes		22,690	100.00%
Democratic gain from Republican			

== District 20 ==
Senate District 20 contained parts of Lane County. For the 1973 Legislature, holdover Democrat Edward Fadeley was assigned to District 20. He switched over to District 21 for the 1974 election and won re-election.

District 20 Democratic primary election
Party	Candidate	Votes	%
Democratic	Jack J. Craig	5,595	58.21%
Democratic	Bill Garrett	3,243	33.74%
Democratic	Roger W. Leasure	771	8.02%
Write-in		3	0.03%
Total votes		9,612	100.00%

District 20 Republican primary election
Party	Candidate	Votes	%
Republican	George F. Wingard (incumbent)	5,796	79.91%
Republican	Shirley Whitehead	1,455	20.06%
Write-in		2	0.03%
Total votes		7,253	100.00%

District 20 election
Party	Candidate	Votes	%
Republican	George F. Wingard (incumbent)	15,223	55.85%
Democratic	Jack J. Craig	12,035	44.13%
Write-in		4	0.01%
Total votes		27,262	100.00%

== District 21 ==
Senate District 21 contained parts of Lane County. For the 1973 Legislature, holdover Republican George F. Wingard was assigned to District 21. He switched over to District 20 for the 1974 election and won re-election.

District 21 Democratic primary election
Party	Candidate	Votes	%
Democratic	Edward Fadeley (incumbent)	6,061	67.74%
Democratic	Cass Lindenberger	2,881	32.20%
Write-in		6	0.07%
Total votes		8,948	100.00%

District 21 Republican primary election
Party	Candidate	Votes	%
Write-in	Edward Fadeley (incumbent)	72	69.23%
Write-in		32	30.77%
Total votes		104	100.00%

District 21 election
Party	Candidate	Votes	%
Democratic	Edward Fadeley (incumbent)	18,307	99.58%
Write-in		78	0.42%
Total votes		18,385	100.00%

== District 22 ==
Senate District 22 contained parts of Douglas and Lane counties. Democratic incumbent Betty Browne won re-election.

District 22 Democratic primary election
Party	Candidate	Votes	%
Democratic	Betty Browne (incumbent)	6,775	99.43%
Write-in		39	0.57%
Total votes		6,814	100.00%

District 22 Republican primary election
Party	Candidate	Votes	%
Republican	Clif Everett	4,513	99.98%
Write-in		1	0.02%
Total votes		4,514	100.00%

District 22 election
Party	Candidate	Votes	%
Democratic	Betty Browne (incumbent)	14,073	57.39%
Republican	Clif Everett	10,443	42.60%
Write-in		3	0.01%
Total votes		24,519	100.00%

== District 26 ==
Senate District 26 contained parts of Jackson and Klamath counties. Republican incumbent L. W. Newbry lost re-election to Democrat Lenn Hannon, who would serve continuously until 2003.

District 26 Democratic primary election
Party	Candidate	Votes	%
Democratic	Lenn Hannon	5,896	99.86%
Write-in		8	0.14%
Total votes		5,904	100.00%

District 26 Republican primary election
Party	Candidate	Votes	%
Republican	L. W. Newbry (incumbent)	6,860	99.87%
Write-in		9	0.13%
Total votes		6,869	100.00%

District 26 election
Party	Candidate	Votes	%
Democratic	Lenn Hannon	12,392	50.03%
Republican	L. W. Newbry (incumbent)	12,344	49.83%
Write-in		6	0.02%
Total votes		24,742	100.00%
Democratic gain from Republican			

== See also ==
- 1974 Oregon gubernatorial election
- List of Oregon Legislative Assemblies
