= Tony Van Vliet =

Tony Van Vliet may refer to:

- Tony Van Vliet (Australian politician) (1933–1982)
- Tony Van Vliet (American politician) (born 1930), member of the Oregon House of Representatives
