= Senator Gold =

Senator Gold may refer to:

- Emanuel R. Gold (1935–2013), New York State Senate
- Shirley Gold (1925–1998), Oregon State Senate
- Thomas R. Gold (1764–1827), New York State Senate
