= Tom Hanlon =

Tom Hanlon may refer to:

- Tom Hanlon (athlete) (born 1967), Scottish athlete in steeplechase
- Tom Hanlon (politician) (born 1945), American politician in the Oregon House of Representatives

== See also ==
- Tommy Hanlon Jr. (1923–2003), American-born actor and television host in Australia
- Tom Hanlin (1907–1953), Scottish fiction writer
