= Ron Eachus =

American politician (1947–2023)

Member of the Oregon House of Representatives from the 39th district
- In office 1985–1987
- Preceded by: Grattan Kerans
- Succeeded by: Jim Edmunson

Personal details
- Born: August 17, 1947 Nyssa, Oregon, U.S.
- Died: October 13, 2023 (aged 76)
- Party: Democratic
- Education: University of Oregon

Ron Eachus (August 17, 1947 – October 13, 2023) was an American politician. He served as a Democratic member for the 39th district of the Oregon House of Representatives.

== Life and career ==
Eachus was born in Nyssa, Oregon. He attended the University of Oregon.

Eachus served in the Oregon House of Representatives from 1985 to 1987.

Eachus was chairman of the Oregon Public Utility Commission during the 1990s.

Eachus died on October 13, 2023, of heart failure, at the age of 76.
