= Mike Ragsdale =

American politician

Member of the Oregon House of Representatives from the 6th district
- In office 1973–1978

Member of the Oregon Senate from the 4th district
- In office 1978–1980

Personal details
- Born: Michael Charles Ragsdale; December 15, 1940 (age 85) La Grande, Oregon, U.S.
- Party: Republican
- Spouse: Diane
- Children: 3

Michael Charles Ragsdale (born December 15, 1940) was an American politician who was a member of the Oregon House of Representatives and Oregon State Senate. He was in the agribusiness.
