= William Grannell =

American politician

William N. Grannell

Member of the Oregon House of Representatives from the 47th district
- In office 1973–1983

Personal details
- Born: January 6, 1938 (age 88) Denver, Colorado
- Party: Democratic
- Profession: Publisher, teacher

William (Bill) N. Grannell (born January 6, 1938), is a former American politician and member of the Oregon House of Representatives. He is a former newspaper publisher for the Coos Bay Empire Builder and junior high school teacher.
