= Gene Timms =

American politician

Minority Leader of the Oregon Senate
- In office 1992–1995
- Preceded by: John Brenneman
- Succeeded by: Dick Springer

Member of the Oregon Senate from the 30th district
- In office 1983–2001
- Preceded by: Bob Smith
- Succeeded by: Steve Harper

Personal details
- Born: May 16, 1932 Burns, Oregon
- Died: April 21, 2014 (aged 81) Burns, Oregon
- Party: Republican
- Children: 2
- Education: Willamette University

Military service
- Branch/service: United States Army

Eugene Dale Timms (May 16, 1932 – April 21, 2014) was an American politician and businessman.

== Early life and education ==
Born in Burns, Oregon, Timms attended Burns High School. He then earned a bachelor's degree in business from Willamette University and served in the United States Army.

== Career ==
After leaving the military, managed his family's business, a creamery. He later owned and operated Big Country Distributor. Timms served in the Oregon State Senate as a Republican from 1983 to 2001, representing the 30th district. He was an advocate for rural health in Oregon.

== Personal life ==
Timms and his wife, Edna, had two children and four grandchildren. Timms died in 2014.
