= Dick Springer =

American politician (1948–2023)

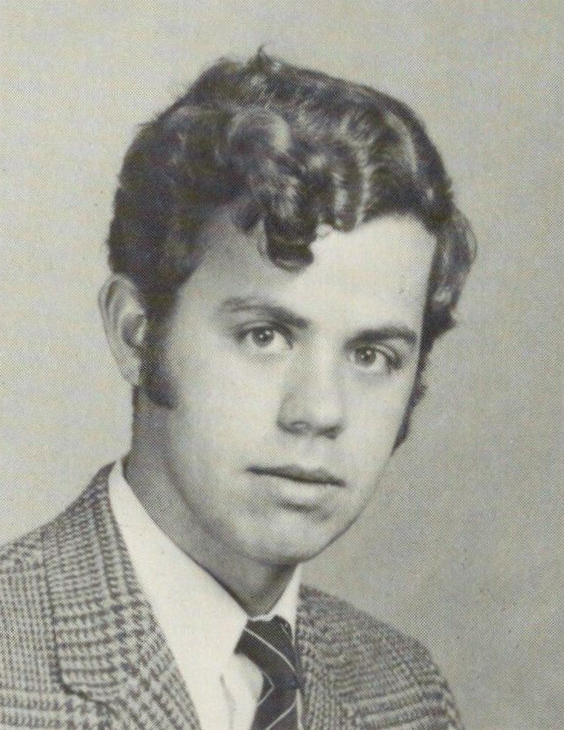
- Springer in the Princeton University yearbook, 1970

Majority Leader of the Oregon Senate
- In office 1993–1995
- Preceded by: Bill Bradbury
- Succeeded by: Brady L. Adams

Minority Leader of the Oregon Senate
- In office 1995–1997
- Preceded by: Gene Timms
- Succeeded by: Clifford W. Trow

Member of the Oregon Senate from the 6th district
- In office 1989–1997
- Preceded by: Jan Wyers
- Succeeded by: Ginny Burdick

Member of the Oregon House of Representatives
- In office 1981–1989
- Preceded by: Jo Simpson
- Succeeded by: Phil Keisling
- Constituency: 10th District (1981–1983); 12th District (1983–1989)

Personal details
- Born: January 25, 1948 Portland, Oregon, U.S.
- Died: April 9, 2023 (aged 75)
- Party: Democratic
- Education: University of Oregon; Princeton University
- Profession: Lawyer

Richard Samuel Springer (January 25, 1948 – April 9, 2023) was an American lawyer and politician, who was a member of the Oregon House of Representatives and the Oregon State Senate. While in the Oregon Senate, he served a stint as its majority leader.

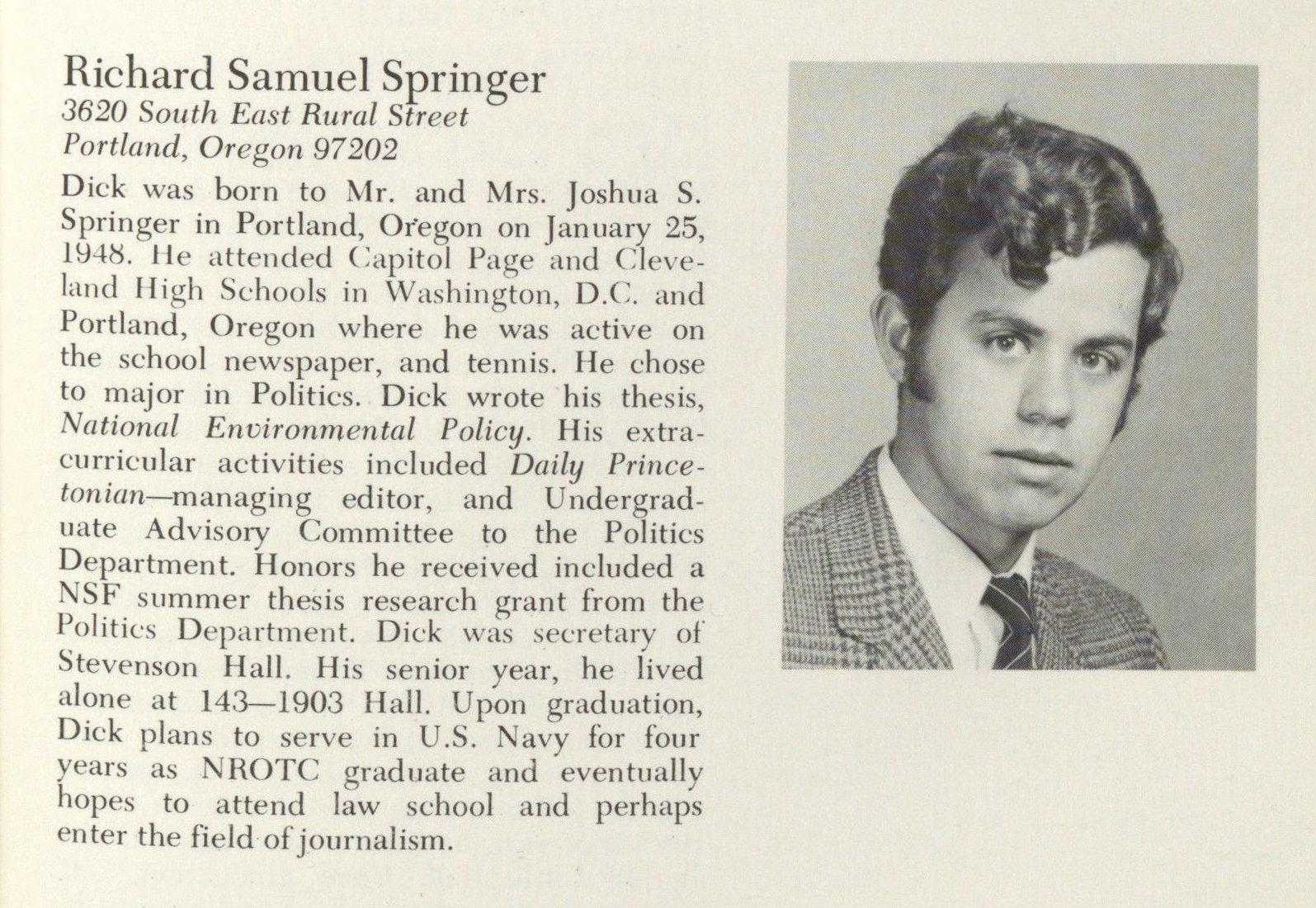
Springer in the Princeton University yearbook, 1970

Springer attended the University of Oregon and Princeton University. He served in the United States Navy in the Vietnam War. He was a member of the Democratic Socialists of America.

Springer was later the district manager for the West Multnomah Soil & Water Conservation District. He died from a heart attack on April 9, 2023, at the age of 75.
