= Bill C. Bellamy =

American politician (born 1949)

Member of the Oregon House of Representatives from the 55th district
- In office 1979–1989
- Preceded by: Jack Sumner
- Succeeded by: Beverly Clarno

Personal details
- Born: December 9, 1949 (age 76) Goldendale, Washington
- Party: Republican
- Profession: vocational agriculture instructor

Bill C. Bellamy (born December 9, 1949) is an American politician who was a member of the Oregon House of Representatives.

Bellamy was born in 1949 at Goldendale, Washington and attended Oregon State University. He worked as a vocational agriculture instructor.
