= Bernie Agrons =

American politician

Member of the Oregon House of Representatives from the 53rd district
- In office 1983–1999

Personal details
- Born: July 13, 1922 Philadelphia, Pennsylvania, U.S.
- Died: October 16, 2015 (aged 93)
- Party: Democratic
- Spouse: Elizabeth Josephine Arnold
- Education: University of California, Berkeley

Bernard Zalmon Agrons (July 13, 1922 – October 16, 2015) was an American politician who was a member of the Oregon House of Representatives. He served from 1983 to 1991 as a Democrat. Born in Philadelphia, Agrons attended the University of California, Berkeley studying forestry and also served in the United States Army Signal Corps. He was married to Elizabeth Josephine (Betty Jo) Arnold from July 21, 1946, until her death on May 11, 2009.
