= Al Young (politician) =

American politician

Member of the Oregon House of Representatives from the 5th district
- In office 1980–1990

Personal details
- Born: July 1, 1942 (age 84) Curwensville, Pennsylvania
- Party: Democratic
- Profession: bricklayer

Alfred Leslie Young (born July 1, 1942), was an American politician who was a member of the Oregon House of Representatives. He was a bricklayer.
