= Tom Throop =

American politician

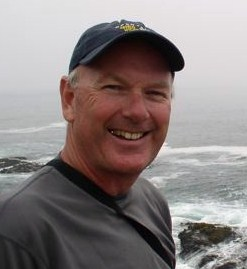

Member of the Oregon House of Representatives from the 54th District
- In office 1979–1987
- Preceded by: Sam Johnson
- Succeeded by: Bob Pickard
- Constituency: Deschutes and Klamath Counties

Personal details
- Born: April 5, 1947 (age 79)
- Party: Democratic
- Spouse: Caryn Talbot Throop
- Children: Lauren E. Throop, Meredy E. Throop
- Education: The College of Idaho

Thomas Huling Throop (born April 5, 1947) is a former Democratic politician from the U.S. state of Oregon. He represented District 54 of the Oregon House of Representatives from 1979 to 1987 and then served for eight years as a member of the Deschutes County Commission.

== Early years ==
Throop graduated from Ontario High School in Ontario, Oregon, in 1965. He attended the College of Idaho in Caldwell, Idaho, on a golf scholarship, graduating in 1969 with a BA in Education. He earned a master's degree in Educational Psychology from the University of Northern Colorado.

== Political career ==
In 1978, Throop was elected State Representative for District 54 of Oregon, which included much of Deschutes and Klamath Counties. He served as Majority Whip and Chair of the Revenue and School Finance Committee for the House of Representatives for three of his four terms. He unsuccessfully coordinated efforts to institute a progressive sales tax in Oregon during a prolonged statewide recession, arguing that such a revision to the tax system would provide stability to Oregon's public sector. He also served on the Environment and Energy Committee and launched several measures relating to Oregon's forests, fisheries, and air quality. He is regarded as an ardent conservationist.

In 1986, Throop was elected as one of three commissioners in Deschutes County, at that time Oregon's fastest-growing county. He concurrently served as a member of the statewide Land Conservation and Development Commission (LCDC). Throop left Oregon in 1994 to become executive director of the Wyoming Outdoor Council, an environmental education and advocacy non-profit organization. During the fall of 1998, Throop was hired as the executive director of the Equality State Policy Center, a Wyoming good governance watchdog. He recently chaired the Wyoming Conservation Voters Education Fund, a grassroots voter education organization benefiting conservation and wildlife.
