= Randy Miller (politician) =

American politician from Oregon

Member of the Oregon House of Representatives from the 37th district
- In office January 13, 2003 – January 10, 2005
- Preceded by: Jeff Kropf
- Succeeded by: Scott Bruun

Member of the Oregon Senate from the 19th district
- In office January 9, 1995 – July 7, 2001
- Preceded by: Joyce Cohen
- Succeeded by: Charles Starr

Personal details
- Party: Republican

Randy Miller Sr. is an American politician from the US state of Oregon. He served 3 terms in the Oregon State Senate, and a term in the State House.

== Career ==
Miller was appointed to the Portland Development Commission in the 1970s aged 29. One accomplishment he had in this role was removing Harbor Drive for Tom McCall Waterfront Park. Miller was first elected in 1994 to the 13th Senate district, and served 3 terms in that district. He was then elected to the 72nd Oregon Legislative Assembly for the 37th House district. In the Senate, one of his main topics of legislation was against the Oregon self gas pumping ban, which he ultimately failed to remove during his service but was lifted in 2023. As of 2023, he was a founder of the convention Reimagine Portland, committed to "build the best version of the city that’s ever been”.

== Personal life ==
Randy Miller has a son, Randy Miller Jr., who is a district court judge for the 11th circuit court.
