= Charles Hanlon =

American politician

Charles J. Hanlon (September 15, 1918 – September 9, 1990) was the first independent member of the U.S. state of Oregon's legislature elected in 50 years, and the fifth in Oregon history. He served three terms in the Oregon Senate, from 1976 to 1986.

He became a Democrat after his first election, in which he defeated the then-Senate Majority Leader, Democrat William Holmstrom. The Oregonian's obituary stated that he was known for his independence throughout his career, noting his opposition to the timber industry's influence on forest management and, specifically, the Oregon Board of Forestry, and his efforts to legalize self-service gasoline in the state. In 1977, he proposed an amendment to the state constitution that would have added two years to House and Senate terms, and imposed a term limit of 12 years. Hanlon was also noted for his constituent services, including a successful effort to force a state barber's licensing board to administer an oral exam to an illiterate barber.

== Life ==
Hanlon was born in Pennsylvania the son of Charles E. Hanlon and Anna Lauri Darby Hanlon, one of five children. His coal miner father volunteered to join a rescue mission at the Kinloch Mine (Parnassus, PA) disaster on March 21, 1929 but perished in the attempt. Of the nearly 300 miners trapped in the explosion ultimately 46 died. Because of this and the start of the Depression he was sent to be raised by an aunt. He served in the United States Army in World War II, and subsequently moved to Ventura, California, where he was an executive for a sand and gravel company. He moved to Oregon in 1958, where he raised cattle and hay on Buck Mountain near Cornelius. He ran for office as an independent, but at the urging of the Republican party, after Holmstrom, who had already secured both the Democratic and Republican nominations for reelection, was accused of ethical misconduct. He chaired committees including revenue, rules, transportation, and agriculture, and served a term as president pro tempore in 1985.

Hanlon represented a district including the city of Gearhart. He launched a petition drive to pass an open primary amendment to the Oregon Constitution in 1975. He first announced he would join the Democratic party in June 1976, bolstering Jason Boe's effort to overcome fellow Democrat Betty Roberts's challenge to his position as Senate president. Hanlon, who had been a registered Democrat two decades prior, said the Senate presidency issue prompted his decision to rejoin the party, though he had been considering it for some time. At the time, The Bend Bulletin stated that he was considered one of the most knowledgeable legislators on the subject of natural resources. He denied that his move was motivated by political gamesmanship, stating that his desire to be appointed chair of a committee was unrelated to joining the party; and he asserted his intention to remain independent, and critical of the two-party system.

Hanlon defeated Holmstrom a second time in 1978, and Representative Ted Bugas in 1982. He was succeeded in his district by Joan Dukes, who said that Hanlon was always more interested in doing what was right, than in doing what was politically expedient. In 1983, he was known for supporting a state sales tax proposal opposed by Senate President Edward Fadeley. According to the Oregonian's obituary, his frustrations over that issue led him to announce his retirement following the session; his comments at the time, however, indicated frustration with the time demands of a job that is intended to be part-time. He reversed the decision to resign and served out the remainder of his term.

Hanlon died of cancer in Salem, Oregon on September 9, 1990; he was survived by his wife Neila and two children.
