= Tom Hanlon (politician) =

American politician

Member of the Oregon House of Representatives from the 2nd district
- In office 1983–1991

Personal details
- Born: August 21, 1945 (age 80) Hempstead, New York; United States
- Party: Democratic
- Profession: fisher

Thomas A. Hanlon (born August 21, 1945) is an American politician who was a member of the Oregon House of Representatives. He worked in the fishery industry.
