= Shirley Gold =

American politician (1925-1998)

Member of the Oregon State Senate from the 7th district
- In office January 9, 1989 – January 13, 1997
- Preceded by: Rod Monroe
- Succeeded by: Kate Brown

Member of the Oregon House of Representatives from the 14th district
- In office January 10, 1983 – January 9, 1989
- Preceded by: Howard Cherry
- Succeeded by: Bev Stein

Member of the Oregon House of Representatives from the 12th district
- In office January 12, 1981 – January 10, 1983
- Preceded by: Rod Monroe
- Succeeded by: Dick Springer

Personal details
- Born: October 2, 1925 New York City, New York
- Died: February 27, 1998 (aged 72) Portland, Oregon
- Party: Democratic

Shirley Gold (October 2, 1925 – February 27, 1998) was an American politician who served in the Oregon House of Representatives from 1981 to 1989. She did not run for re-election in 1988, but instead ran for the Oregon State Senate, where she would serve from 1989 to 1997. She was succeeded in the House by fellow Democrat Bev Stein.

In 1995, Gold was described as a "longtime advocate of child care" as the chair of the Senate Revenue Committee that sponsored two bills that intended to improve childcare workers' pay.

She did not run for re-election to the Senate in 1996, and was succeeded by fellow Democrat Kate Brown, who would later become Secretary of State and then Governor of Oregon.

Gold died of pancreatic cancer on February 27, 1998, in Portland, Oregon at age 72.
