= Jan Wyers =

American politician (born 1939)

Member of the Oregon Senate from the 6th district
- In office January 10, 1977 – January 9, 1989
- Preceded by: Loyal Lang
- Succeeded by: Dick Springer

Personal details
- Born: January 2, 1939 (age 87) Hood River, Oregon
- Party: Democratic
- Profession: attorney

Jan Gerbrand Wyers (born January 2, 1939), is a retired American politician who was a member of the Oregon State Senate. He also worked as an attorney. He later served as a judge in the Multnomah County Circuit Court, until retiring in 2006.
