= Max Rijken =

Dutch-Indonesian born American politician (1920-1987)

Max C. Rijken

Member of the Oregon House of Representatives from the 38th, 4th district
- In office January 13, 1975 – January 12 1987
- Preceded by: Gordon L. Macpherson
- Succeeded by: Don Butsch

Personal details
- Born: 1920 Java, Dutch East Indies (now Indonesia)
- Died: April 14, 1987 Salem, Oregon
- Party: Democratic
- Spouse: Leginah E. Rijken
- Children: Hedy Rijken

Max C. Rijken (1920-1987) is an Indonesian-American politician who was a member of the Oregon House of Representatives from 1975 to 1987.

== Early life ==
Rijken was born on the Indonesian island Java in 1920.

He served in the South West Pacific theatre of World War II, serving in the Royal Netherlands East Indies Army. He was taken as a prisoner of war and was send off to forced labor in a coal mine in the Japanese-occupied Philippines. He survived the Bataan Death March. Following the liberation of the Philippines, he was returned to the Dutch East Indies.

He also served in the Indonesian National Revolution. Following Indonesia's independence He immigrated to Netherlands in 1954 and to the US in 1962 under a Dutch-Indonesian immigration quota.

== Career ==
Rijken was described as a conservative Blue Dog Democrat. He was noted for his work for the elderly, the arts, and history education in schools. Outside of politics, he worked in the paper industry.
