= Rod Monroe =

American politician (1942–2026)

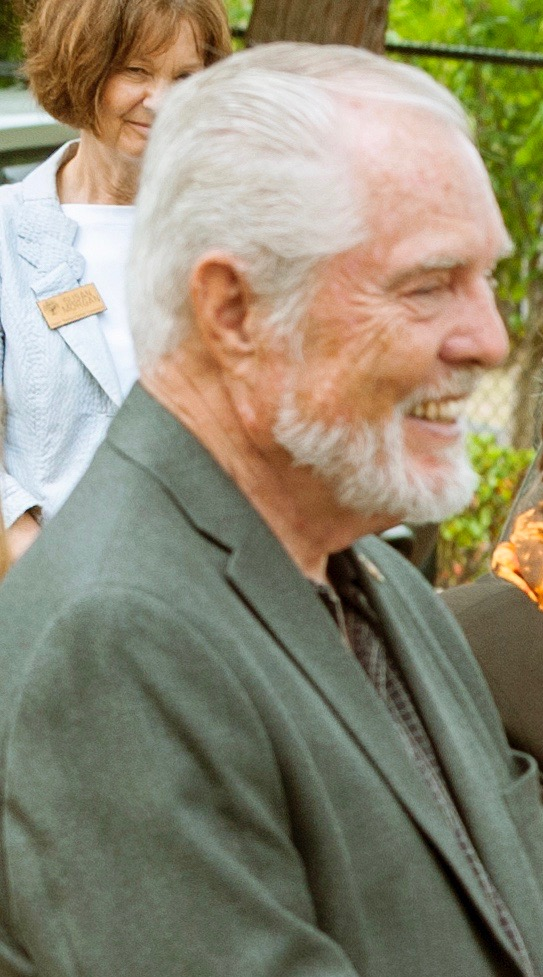
- Monroe in 2016

Member of the Oregon Senate from the 24th district
- In office 2007–2019
- Preceded by: Frank Shields
- Succeeded by: Shemia Fagan

Metro Councilor
- In office 1993–1996, 1998–2004

Member of the Oregon Senate from the 7th district
- In office 1981–1989
- Preceded by: Stephen Kafoury
- Succeeded by: Shirley Gold

Member of the Oregon House of Representatives from the 12th district
- In office 1977–1981
- Preceded by: Grace Olivier Peck
- Succeeded by: Shirley Gold

Personal details
- Born: Wayne Roderick Monroe; August 20, 1942 McBride, British Columbia, Canada
- Died: February 20, 2026 (aged 83) Portland, Oregon, U.S.
- Party: Democratic
- Spouse: Billie Ballrot (m. 1961)
- Education: Portland State College (BA, MA)
- Profession: Teacher
- Rod Monroe's voice Monroe being interviewed by Bruce Broussard; Recorded August 30, 2011

Wayne Roderick Monroe (August 20, 1942 – February 20, 2026) was an American politician who served in the Oregon Senate, representing District 24 in the middle part of Multnomah County, which includes most of eastern Portland and the city of Happy Valley.

== Early life and education ==
Born in McBride, British Columbia, Monroe was raised in Oregon and graduated from Portland's Franklin High School in 1960. He attended college at Warner Pacific University and received bachelor's and master's degrees from Portland State College (now Portland State University) in 1965 and 1969 respectively.

== Career ==
Monroe became a teacher at Tigard High School in Tigard, Oregon, in 1965, teaching history and government and later served on the David Douglas school board.

In 1976, Monroe was elected to the Oregon House of Representatives, representing District 12 in Portland. He served two terms and then was elected to the Oregon Senate in 1980, representing the 7th district in Portland. He was re-elected to a second Senate term in 1984. During this legislative tenure, Monroe was known for sponsoring safety-oriented legislation, such as mandatory seat belt laws, tougher drunk driving legislation, and bans on indoor smoking.

Monroe ran for the Democratic nomination in the 1986 U.S. Senate election in Oregon, but came in second behind Jim Weaver.

In 1988, he lost a close election in the Democratic primary to Oregon House Majority Leader Shirley Gold, who had been elected to Monroe's seat when he was elected to the Senate. In the 1990 Democratic primary, Monroe sought to upset incumbent Judy Bauman for a seat in the Oregon House, but he was narrowly defeated.

In 1992, Monroe was elected to the council of Metro, the regional government for greater Portland. He served three terms, where he advocated for federal funding of light rail projects and the Portland Streetcar, as well as for biking and pedestrian trails such as the Springwater Corridor. In 2004, he was defeated for a fourth term by environmentalist Robert Liberty.

In Oregon's 2006 legislative elections, Monroe was again elected to the Oregon Senate in the District 24 seat vacated by the retiring Frank Shields.

In 2018, Monroe ran for reelection but was defeated in the Democratic primary by former state Representative Shemia Fagan. Fagan ran unopposed in the general election later that year and won the election to become Monroe's successor in the state Senate.

== Personal life and death ==
Monroe lived in Portland, Oregon, with his wife Billie, whom he married in 1961. He died at his home in Portland on February 20, 2026, at the age of 83.

== Electoral history ==
2006 Oregon State Senator, 24th district
Party	Candidate	Votes	%
Democratic	Rod Monroe	17,304	48.7
Republican	T.J. Reilly	15,483	43.6
Independent	Ron McCarty	2,653	7.5
Write-in		85	0.2
Total votes		35,525	100%

2010 Oregon State Senator, 24th district
Party	Candidate	Votes	%
Democratic	Rod Monroe	18,337	51.9
Republican	Rob Wheeler	16,905	47.8
Write-in		103	0.3
Total votes		35,345	100%

2014 Oregon State Senator, 24th district
Party	Candidate	Votes	%
Democratic	Rod Monroe	22,491	95.1
Write-in		1,155	4.9
Total votes		23,646	100%
