= Lonnie J. Roberts =

American politician

Member of the Oregon House of Representatives from the 21st district
- In office 1981–1999
- Succeeded by: Randy Leonard

Personal details
- Born: Lonnie Jerome Roberts; October 6, 1937 (age 88) Portland, Oregon
- Party: Democratic
- Spouse: Joan
- Profession: consultant, trucker

Lonnie Jerome Roberts (born October 6, 1937) is an American politician who was a member of the Oregon House of Representatives.

Roberts was born in Portland in 1937. He attended the University of Portland and Marylhurst College, earning a Master of Science degree in political science. He worked as a consultant and as a trucker. He later served as County Commissioner of Multnomah County, Oregon.
