= Liz VanLeeuwen =

American politician (1925–2022)

Member of the Oregon House of Representatives from the 37th district
- In office 1981–1999

Personal details
- Born: November 5, 1925 Lakeview, Oregon, U.S.
- Died: November 27, 2022 (aged 97) Halsey, Oregon, U.S.
- Party: Republican
- Spouse: George VanLeeuwen
- Education: Oregon State University
- Profession: Farmer

Elizabeth Susan Nelson VanLeeuwen (née Nelson; November 5, 1925 – November 27, 2022) was an American politician who was a member of the Oregon House of Representatives.

== Early life and career ==
VanLeeuwen was born in Lakeview, Oregon, where she lived until attending Oregon State University. She received a Bachelor of Science in Home Making Education and a minor in English in 1947. She married George VanLeeuwen on June 15, 1947, and was a farmer. She also was a news reporter and journalist for a newspaper in Brownsville, Oregon, from 1949 to 1970. She was a school teacher at Monroe High School, a substitute teacher and an adult educator in the 1950s and 1960s. She had a weekly farm report radio program on KWIL in the 1970s.

VanLeeuwen was a founding member of Oregon Women for Agriculture and a member of the Oregon Farm Bureau Women's Committee and Legislative Committee before being elected to the Oregon House of Representatives.

== Political career ==
VanLeeuwen served as a member of the Oregon House of Representatives from 1981 to 1999.

In 1999, she was elected to the Linn County Soil and Water Conservation board and held a position there.

In 2002, VanLeeuwen ran for Oregon's 4th congressional district against Peter DeFazio (D). She lost 64% to 34%.

== Personal life and death ==
VanLeeuwen and her husband George lived in Halsey, Oregon, and had four children. She died there on November 27, 2022, at the age of 97.
