= Mary Burrows =

American politician (1932–2018)

Mary McCauley Burrows
- 1973 Official portrait

Member of the Oregon House of Representatives from the 4th district
- In office 1973–1987

Personal details
- Born: August 27, 1932 Palco, Kansas, United States
- Died: October 23, 2018 (aged 86) Portland, Oregon, United States
- Party: Republican
- Spouse: Chuck Burrows
- Profession: homemaker

Mary Lee Burrows (née McCauley; August 27, 1932 - October 23, 2018) was an American politician who was a member of the Oregon House of Representatives. She was an alumna of Northwest Christian University and a secretary for the California Republican Assembly. Burrows was also the chair for the Lane County campaigns of Senator Bob Packwood and Governor Tom McCall in the 1967 and 1970 elections, respectively.
