= Joyce Cohen =

American politician

Member of the Oregon House of Representatives from the 24th district
- In office 1979–1983

Member of the Oregon Senate from the 13th district
- In office 1983–1995
- Succeeded by: Randy Miller

Personal details
- Born: March 27, 1937 (age 89) McIntosh, South Dakota
- Party: Democratic

Joyce Evyonne Cohen (born March 27, 1937) was an American politician who was a member of the Oregon House of Representatives and Oregon State Senate.
