= Fred Parkinson (politician) =

American politician

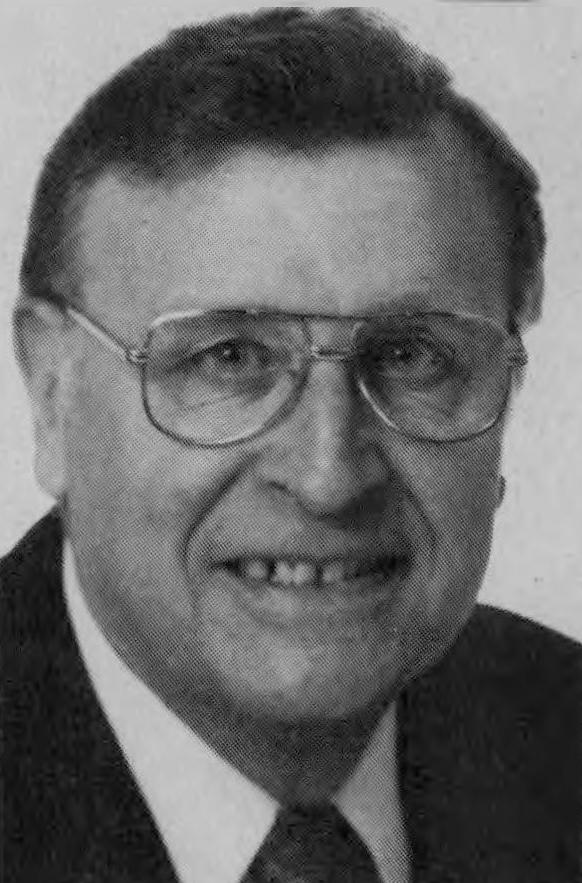

Member of the Oregon House of Representatives from the 28th district
- In office 1981–1993

Personal details
- Born: June 12, 1929 Rexburg, Idaho
- Died: January 5, 2023 (aged 93)
- Party: Republican
- Spouse: Nola Jean Minshew (m. 1951)
- Children: 5
- Parents: Fred Droney Parkinson (father); Mary Yvette Raymond (mother)
- Profession: pharmacist

Fred Raymond Parkinson (Note: While Parkinson's given name was Fred Raymond Parkinson, his legal name was Baby Boy Parkinson until 1960, when he changed it to Fred R. Parkinson.) (June 12, 1929 – January 5, 2023) was an American politician from Oregon.

Parkinson was born in Rexburg, Idaho in 1929, the son of Fred Droney and Mary Yvette (née Raymond) Parkinson. He married Nola Jean Minshew in 1951. He attended Idaho State University where he earned a bachelor of science degree in pharmacy. Parkinson was appointed to the Medford, Oregon city council in 1953. He owned several drug stores, purchasing his first in 1955 in Silverton, Oregon, a second in Mt. Angel in 1968, and a third in McMinnville in 1970. He has elected to the Silverton City Council in 1972, then as the city's mayor in 1974. He served in the Oregon House of Representatives from 1981 to 1993.
