= Bob Brogoitti =

American politician (1920-2009)

Member of the Oregon House of Representatives from the 58 district
- In office January 10, 1977 – July 4, 1989
- Preceded by: Edward Earl Patterson
- Succeeded by: Ray Baum

Personal details
- Born: Robert Allen Brogoitti; June 14 1920 Long Beach, California, US
- Died: April 5 2009 La Grande, Oregon, US
- Party: Republican
- Spouse: Marion (née Hughes)
- Children: 3

Robert Allen Brogoitti (June 14, 1920 – April 5, 2009) was an American politician who served as a member of the Oregon House of Representatives. He was elected 6 times, and served for 12 years.

== Early life ==
Brogoitti was born in Long Beach, California, to Seaborn Epsy "Seb" Brogoitti and Ada Ruth McAlavy. He was of Italian, Irish, and British descent. He was raised in Helix, Oregon, and attended Washington State University. Brogoitti moved to La Grande, Oregon, in 1962 and went on to represent the city in the legislature. Outside of politics, he worked as a rancher.

== Career ==
Brogoitti endorsed Richard Nixon's 1972 Presidential Campaign, and was an agricultural advisor to his administration. He opposed a seat belt mandate in the legislature, citing a belief in "less and not more governmental interference in the private lives of citizens".
