= Mae Yih =

American politician (born 1928)

Member of the Oregon House of Representatives
- In office 1977–1983

Oregon State Senator
- In office 1983–2003
- Succeeded by: Frank Morse

Personal details
- Born: May 4, 1928 (age 98) Shanghai, China
- Party: Democratic
- Spouse: Stephen Yih (deceased)
- Education: Barnard College; Columbia University

Mae Yih
- Traditional Chinese: 鄧稚鳳
- Simplified Chinese: 邓稚凤
Transcriptions
Standard Mandarin
- Hanyu Pinyin: Xié Dèng Zhìfèng

Mae Yih (born Chih Feng Dunn May 24, 1928) is a former member of both houses of the legislature of the U.S. state of Oregon. She is the first Chinese American to serve in a state senate in the United States.

== Early life and education ==
Yih was born Chih Feng Dunn on May 24, 1928, in Shanghai, China, to Chun Woo and Fung Wen Feng Dunn. Her family was quite well off, with her father owning two textile mills, a nightclub and hotel that is now the Peace Hotel, and an automobile dealership. She attended a girls' school, which relocated to a foreign concession during the Japanese occupation of Shanghai, and finished her high school education in 1946. Following high school, Dunn began her college education at St. John's University in Shanghai.

In September 1948, Dunn transferred to Barnard College in New York City, graduating in 1951 with a bachelor's degree in economics. While at Barnard, the president of the college, Millicent McIntosh, encouraged the students to be involved in decision making. She later stated that this served as an inspiration to enter politics. Following the completion of her undergraduate studies, Dunn began work on a master's degree in accounting at Columbia University, which she did not complete.

== Political career ==
In Albany, Yih volunteered at her children's school, eventually running for the local school board. She started service on the Clover Ridge Elementary School board in 1969, moving to the Albany Union High School board in 1975. In 1976, the local Democratic Party chairperson asked Yih to run for the Oregon State House. Yih won the election, defeating a Republican opponent who had 14 years of incumbency. Yih took office in 1977. She went on to serve three two-year terms in the House.

In 1982, Yih decided to run for a seat in the Oregon State Senate. She won this election, and was re-elected in 1986, 1990, 1994, and 1998. Yih was elected Senate President Pro Tempore for the 1993–1995 session. Yih decided not to seek re-election in 2002 and retired at the end of her term in January 2003.

Known as a conservative Democrat, Yih's many accomplishments included passage of laws establishing Enterprise Zones to promote job creations; Office of Oregon Trade Representative in Shanghai to enhance trade between Oregon and China; child support legislation to expedite child support and reduce public assistance; equal property tax relief for Linn County residents by correcting a legislative drafting error permanently; appropriation for regional Adolescent Drug & Alcohol Treatment Center; school curriculum to encourage sexual abstinence to reduce teen pregnancy; lottery funds for the rehabilitation and preventive maintenance of covered bridges and a study for assessing the health of the Willamette River. Yih was also known as a strong supporter of field burning because it is a more effective control of disease and insects than the use of chemicals. Yih introduced and passed legislation to establish sister state relationship with Fujian province, China in 1983. She accompanied Oregon governor Atiyeh to sign the agreement with Governor of Fujian province in 1984. Yih organized legislative leadership trade delegation to visit Fujian province and other cities in China in 1992, 1997, 2000, and 2002. Yih was awarded Honorary Citizen of Fujian Province in 1994.

Following her retirement in 2003, Yih received the Distinguished Service Award from the Albany Chamber of Commerce. This is the same award that her husband received in 1968. The Albany street Yih Lane, where her district office was, is named for her family.

== Personal life ==
On June 7, 1953, Dunn married noted metallurgist Stephen Yih at the Riverside Church in New York City. He worked for Wah Chang Corporation, which transferred him to Albany, Oregon in 1956. Yih accompanied him on the move. Stephen Yih was the founder of Wah Chang Corporation in Albany and was president for 20 years. He died in March 2009. They had two sons—Donald, a physician, and Daniel, an attorney—and four grandchildren. Yih is a member of the Episcopal Church.
