= Grattan Kerans =

American politician (1941–2019)

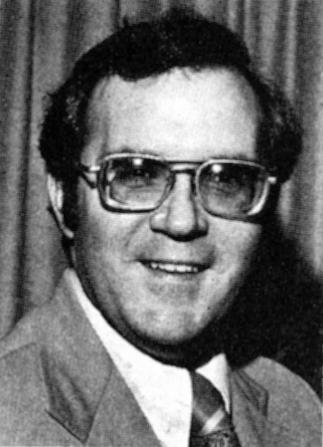

Member of the Oregon State Senate
- In office 1986–1993
- Succeeded by: Pete Sorenson
- Constituency: Lane County

56th Speaker of the Oregon House of Representatives
- In office 1983–1984
- Preceded by: Hardy Myers
- Succeeded by: Vera Katz
- Constituency: Lane County

Member of the Oregon House of Representatives
- In office 1974–1984
- Constituency: Lane County

Personal details
- Born: January 2, 1941 Washington, D.C.
- Died: January 16, 2019 (aged 78) Seattle, Washington
- Party: Democratic
- Spouse: Janet
- Profession: Politician

Grattan Kerans (January 2, 1941 – January 16, 2019) was an American politician from Oregon, who served in the Oregon House of Representatives from 1974 through 1984, and in the Oregon State Senate from 1986 to 1993. He held the position of Speaker of the House during the 1983 legislative session.

== Biography ==
=== Early years ===
Grattan Kerans was born January 2, 1941, in Washington, D.C., the son of Edwin Grattan Kerans and the former Anne Kelley. His father was a dentist for the Veterans Administration and his mother a lawyer. Grattan Kerans' unusual first name was in honor of a grandfather who had been a prominent official in the Democratic Party and who had worked in the presidential administration of Franklin D. Roosevelt.

Kerans attended public schools in Maryland and following graduation attended Montgomery College in Rockville, Maryland.

In 1965 Kerans married the former Janet Raye Holsclaw. The couple had one child, a son. He worked as a shoe salesman, a warehouse employee, and a taxi driver during his younger years.

In 1969 Kerans moved to the American West, relocating to attend the University of Oregon to study political science. Kerans became the editor of the campus daily newspaper of the University of Oregon, the Oregon Daily Emerald, serving in that position from 1970 to 1971. Following graduation he took his editorial capability to the world of politics, becoming editor of the Oregon Democrat Magazine, a publication of the Democratic Party of Oregon.

=== Political career ===
In November 1974, Kerans won election to the Oregon House of Representatives from Lane County, a position he continued to hold through five terms of office. During his 10-year career in the Oregon House, Kerans served as Chair of the Elections Committee and Rules Committee, and as the floor whip for the majority Democrats. In 1983, Kerans was elected by his peers as the Speaker of the House for the biennial legislative session held in that year.

Kerans gave up his seat in the House in 1984 to run for Oregon State Treasurer. Chosen as the Democratic nominee in the May primary election, Kerans went on to lose to Republican Bill Rutherford in the November 1984 general election, falling to defeat by a margin of 18 percentage points.

Finding himself outside of government for the first time in a decade, Kerans took a position as a lobbyist for the City of Eugene, holding the post for one year. He established a publication design company.

During the fall of 1987 Kerans joined the Oregon for Dukakis State Steering Committee and was one of 25 members of the steering committee introduced by Kitty Dukakis at an airport press conference. At the Oregon Democratic State Convention in 1988 Kerans was one of ten Oregon Democrats elected as Dukakis delegates to the 1988 Democratic National Convention in Atlanta, Georgia.

Kerans returned to the Oregon Legislative Assembly after election to the Oregon State Senate from Lane County in 1986. In 1987, he was the lone dissenter in a 24–1 vote appointing Richard G. Reiten as the new director of the state Economic Development Department. Kerans was concerned about Reiten's membership in the all-male Arlington Club, even though Reiten himself was open to the club allowing women to join. Kerans doubted the Arlington Club would change its policies stating, "This is, after all, a 124-year-old club and they haven't changed their minds yet." In 1990, Arlington Club opened its doors to women.

Kerans won re-election to a second term in the Oregon Senate in November 1990, but resigned in 1993, prior to completion of his four-year term, to take a job lobbying for the State System of Higher Education. He had failed to win election as Senate President during the 1993 session.

=== Later years ===
Following his years in the legislature, Kerans worked as a lobbyist for the Oregon University System beginning in 1993 until 2004.

Kerans and his wife retired to Tucson, Arizona in 2008. They moved to Seattle in 2017, where Kerans died in January 2019.
