= John Schoon =

American politician (born 1929)

Member of the Oregon House of Representatives from the 34th district
- In office 1979–1995
- Succeeded by: Lane Shetterly

Personal details
- Born: July 9, 1929 (age 97) Gary, Indiana, U.S.
- Party: Republican
- Spouse: Carol Ann Williams
- Profession: banker

John Edward Schoon (born July 9, 1929) is an American retired politician who was a member of the Oregon House of Representatives.

== Life and career ==
John Edward Schoon was born in Gary, Indiana on July 9, 1929. He attended the University of Maryland and Portland State University, earning Bachelor of Science and Master of Business Administration degrees. He was a banker, working with First National Bank Oregon, in Salem. Schoon also served in the United States Marine Corps, earning an Air Medal. His brother, Dick Schoon, served in the Washington House of Representatives.
