= Larry Campbell (Oregon politician) =

American politician

Member of the Oregon House of Representatives
- In office 1979–1995
- Constituency: Lane County

58th Speaker of the Oregon House of Representatives
- In office 1991–1995
- Preceded by: Vera Katz
- Succeeded by: Beverly Clarno

Personal details
- Born: July 31, 1931 (age 94) Des Moines, Iowa, U.S.
- Party: Republican
- Spouse: Karlyn Mattson
- Profession: Politician

Larry L. Campbell (born July 31, 1931) is an American politician who served as Speaker of the Oregon House of Representatives from 1991 to 1995. A Republican, he was a member of the Oregon House of Representatives from 1979 to 1995, representing Eugene.

== Early years ==
Larry Campbell began his career in the army and was honorably discharged as a Sergeant First Class. Campbell served as the Republican leader from 1982 to 1990. Campbell is credited with engineering his party's 1990 takeover of the state legislature, which lasted 16 years.

== Lobbying career ==
He began working as a lobbyist in 1995, immediately after the end of his legislative term. He was criticized for pre-filing a bill that benefited a client, with whom he had signed a contract while still a legislator.

In 1999, he was considered the most powerful man in Salem. He started the Oregon Victory PAC, which quickly became the biggest lobbying group in the state outside the major parties; it contributed over $750,000 to Oregon politicians in the 1990s. He drew criticism for campaigning on behalf of Republican control of the legislature during the 2007 legislative session.
