= Oregon's 15th Senate district =

Oregon's 15th Senate District as of September 27, 2021

District 15 of the Oregon State Senate comprises central Washington County, including most of Hillsboro as well as Forest Grove and Cornelius. It is composed of Oregon House districts 29 and 30. It is currently represented by Democrat Janeen Sollman of Hillsboro.

== Election results ==
District boundaries have changed over time. Therefore, senators before 2021 may not represent the same constituency as today. From 1993 until 2003, the district covered parts of the northern Willamette Valley; from 2003 until 2013, it stretched from Rockcreek west to Forest Grove; and from 2013 until 2023, it stretched slightly north to cover Helvetia.

The current district is very similar to its previous iterations, changing only by losing North Plains and parts of south Hillsboro and adding rural land south of Cornelius and Forest Grove.

The results are as follows:

Year	Candidate	Party	Percent	Opponent	Party	Percent	Opponent	Party	Percent
1984	Tony Meeker	Republican	72.9%	Douglas Edward Matney	Democratic	27.1%	No third candidate		
1988	Jim Bunn	Republican	53.5%	Susan Sokol Blosser	Democratic	46.5%	No third candidate		
1992	Jim Bunn	Republican	100.0%	Unopposed					
1996	Marilyn Shannon	Republican	51.7%	Stu Rasmussen	Democratic	43.7%	Kelly Keith	Constitution	4.6%
2000	Roger Beyer	Republican	66.5%	Roger Pike	Democratic	33.4%	No third candidate		
2002	Bruce Starr	Republican	62.0%	Ermine Todd	Democratic	34.7%	Tom Humphrey	Constitution	3.3%
2006	Bruce Starr	Republican	55.0%	John Napolitano	Democratic	44.9%	No third candidate		
2010	Bruce Starr	Republican	52.1%	Chuck Riley	Democratic	47.6%	No third candidate		
2014	Chuck Riley	Democratic	45.7%	Bruce Starr	Republican	45.0%	Caitlin Mitchel-Markley	Libertarian	9.0%
2018	Chuck Riley	Democratic	59.3%	Alexander Flores	Republican	40.5%	No third candidate		
2022	Janeen Sollman (Note: Janeen Sollman was the incumbent in this election after being appointed after the resignation of Chuck Riley.)	Democratic	55.5%	Carolina Malmedal	Republican	44.4%	No third candidate		
