= Edward Fadeley =

American judge (1929–2015)

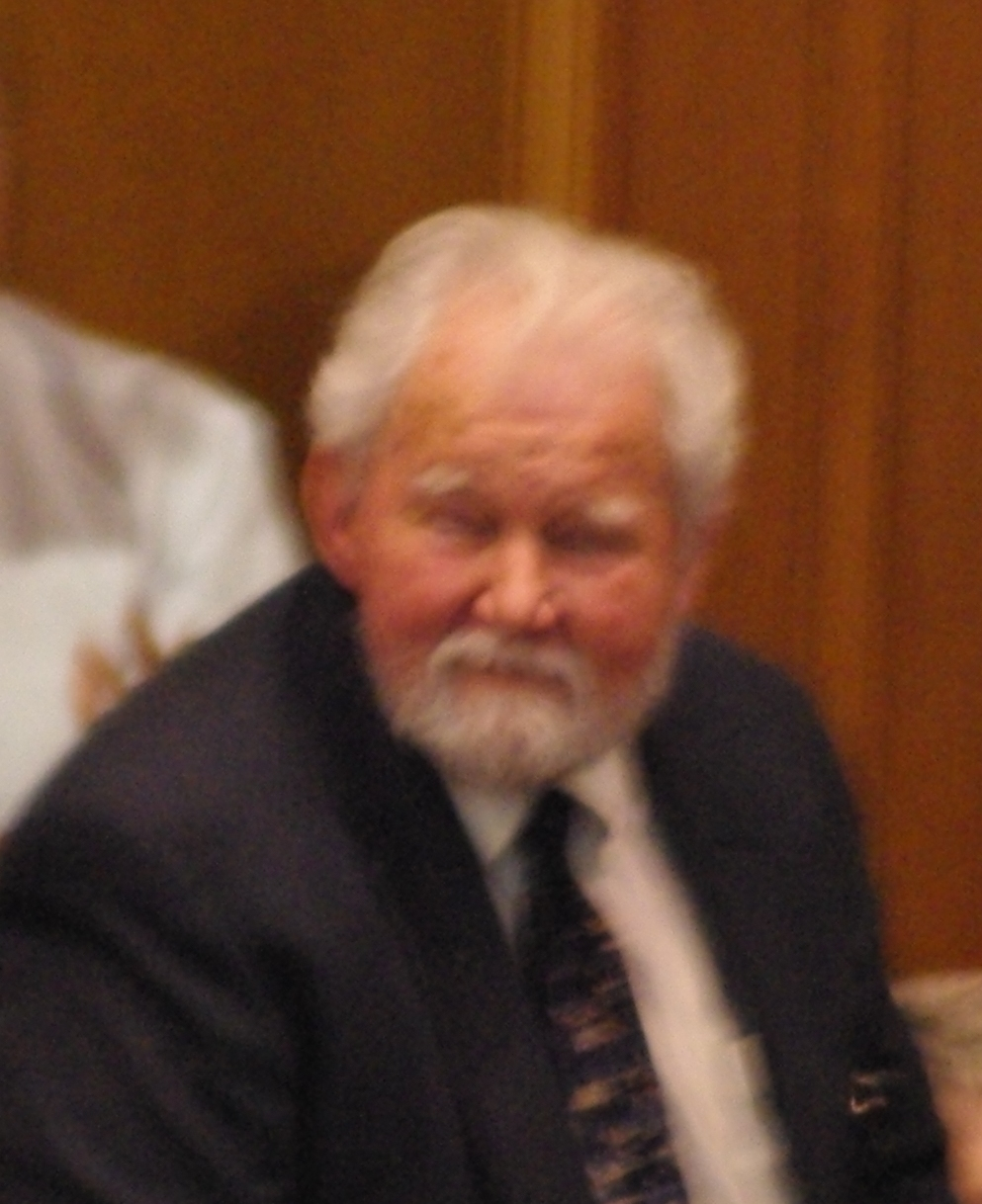
- Fadeley in 2009

88th Justice of the Oregon Supreme Court
- In office January 1, 1989 – January 31, 1998
- Preceded by: J. R. Campbell
- Succeeded by: Susan M. Leeson

President of the Oregon State Senate
- In office 1983–1984
- Preceded by: Fred W. Heard
- Succeeded by: John Kitzhaber

Personal details
- Born: Edward Norman Fadeley; December 13, 1929 Williamsville, Missouri
- Died: August 30, 2015 (aged 85) Springfield, Oregon
- Party: Democratic Party
- Spouse(s): Nancie Fadeley (1953–1984); Darian Fadeley (1987/88–2015)
- Education: University of Missouri; University of Oregon

Military service
- Allegiance: United States
- Branch/service: United States Navy

Edward Norman Fadeley (December 13, 1929 – August 30, 2015) was an American attorney and politician in the state of Oregon. He was the 88th justice of the Oregon Supreme Court. Previously he served in both the Oregon House of Representatives and the Oregon State Senate, serving one session as President of the Oregon Senate. In later years he faced allegations of sexual harassment and was reprimanded for legal ethics violations.

== Early life ==
Edward Norman Fadeley was born on December 13, 1929, in Williamsville, Missouri, the son of Robert Sylvester Fadeley and Nelle Fadeley (née Norman), both teachers. He was raised in Missouri, and at the age of 14 he decided he wanted to become a lawyer. After high school he attended and graduated from the University of Missouri in Columbia.

Fadeley then joined the United States Navy where he served for three years. After the Navy he moved to Eugene, Oregon where he enrolled at the University of Oregon School of Law. There he purchased a house when he arrived in 1954 and announced during the first term that he would finish first in his class. In 1957, Fadeley graduated from law school at the university, first in his class.

== Career ==
Fadeley entered private legal practice, where he remained for 31 years. In 1960, Fadeley was elected to the Oregon House of Representatives as a Democrat from Eugene. He would serve 26 years in the Oregon Legislature. In 1963, he moved to the Oregon State Senate where he would become Senate President in 1983. Beginning in 1971 he would serve several sessions in the legislature with his then-wife Nancie Fadeley, who was serving in the House. While in the legislature in 1983 he failed in an attempt to amend the Oregon Constitution to prevent any sales tax in the state, but did defeat attempts to pass a sales tax during the session.

In 1986, he ran for governor, but lost in the primary election to Neil Goldschmidt. In 1988 Fadeley ran for an open seat on the Oregon Supreme Court to fill the position of J. R. Campbell whose term had expired and won on November 8, 1988, against Vern Cook. He won re-election to a second six-year term in 1994 before resigning from the court on January 31, 1998.

During his campaign in 1988 Fadeley violated the rules of judicial ethics by asking for campaign contributions. This led to the first time in the history of the Oregon Supreme Court that the court censured one of its own members. In 1996, the Commission on Judicial Fitness and Disability filed a complaint against justice Fadeley alleging sexual harassment, among other charges. The following year the Commission recommended Fadeley be suspended, but the Oregon Supreme Court dismissed all allegations after Fadeley resigned from the court.

Mary Botkin, a labor lobbyist, said of Fadeley, "During a period when women went from being office toys and decoration to serious partners in the world of work, I think Ed was one of those people who never really understood the transition." Betty Roberts, Fadeley's former State Senate colleague, said that "He thinks any woman wants to be told -- even in a business setting -- that they are good looking."

Fadeley was later sued by the firm that defended him against the ethics violations allegation for fees owed, but Fadeley claimed the fees charged were "outrageous" as well as that the defense was inadequate. In 2007, Fadeley was suspended by the Oregon Supreme Court for 30 days for violations of ethics rules, including charging an excessive fee.

== Personal life ==
He married Nancie Peacocke and the couple had two children, Shira and Charles. He divorced Nancie in 1984 and married his second wife, Darian, many years later.

He died of heart failure at a hospital in Springfield, Oregon, on August 30, 2015. He had suffered a heart attack around a week prior to his death.
