= Denny Jones =

American politician (1910–2012)

- Jones in c. 1968

Member of the Oregon House of Representatives from the 60th district
- In office 1973–1999
- Preceded by: Bob Smith
- Succeeded by: Tom Butler

Personal details
- Born: September 21, 1910 Morrow County, Oregon, US
- Died: April 25, 2012 (aged 101) Ontario, Oregon, US
- Party: Republican
- Profession: Rancher

Denzil Eugene Jones (September 21, 1910 – April 25, 2012) was an American rancher and Republican politician. Jones is remembered as a 13-term member of the Oregon Legislative Assembly in which he represented citizens from four counties in the sparsely populated Eastern part of the state.

== Biography ==
=== Early years ===
Jones, known by his nickname of "Denny," was born September 21, 1910, in rural Morrow County, Oregon, in a house on a wheat farm located between the towns of Ione and Heppner. His family moved briefly to the state of Montana before returning to Wheeler County in Eastern Oregon, where Jones attended public school in the small town of Spray.

Jones' mother died when he was 5 years old. Following this, his father moved the family to Crook County, where Jones attended school at Prineville. He completed two years of school at Crook County High School before being pulled out by his father, who had designs on making his diminutive son into a professional racing jockey. Jones spent over a year riding horses throughout British Columbia, Canada and in Tijuana, Mexico, before he began to gain too much weight, making a further career in horse racing impossible.

Jones returned to rural Malheur County, Oregon, where he took a job on a cattle ranch. He would remain a ranch hand and rancher for the rest of his working life.

In 1939, Jones went into a business partnership with a cousin who owned two cattle ranches, one near the small Oregon town of Jonesboro and the other in close proximity to Juntura. Jones managed the Jonesburo operation for the next ten years before ultimately buying the operation, on which he ran 400 head of cattle. Jones' ranch would ultimately grow to 550 head of cattle contained on 23,000 acres of high desert rangeland.

Jones ran the ranch for the next 30 years, serving twice during this time as president of the Oregon Cattlemen's Association (OCA). In this capacity Jones gained his first legislative experience engaging in political lobbying on behalf of the interests of the OCA.

=== Political career ===
In 1971 Jones and his wife Mildred passed the ranch on to one of their sons and moved to the town of Ontario, one of the largest communities in Eastern Oregon. Jones was soon approached by a number of local business leaders who sought to convince the retired rancher to run for political office in the Oregon House of Representatives' 60th District, which was recently opened as a result of the retirement of Rep. Bob Smith of Burns.

Jones was amenable to the idea of entering politics and entered the race as a Republican candidate, handily winning election in November 1972. Jones would serve in the Oregon Legislature continuously for the next 26 years, serving from 1973 until forced out of office by term limits in 1999.

Jones was a member for 18 years of the powerful Ways and Means Committee as well as the Oregon Legislative Emergency Board, a legislative executive committee dealing with financial matters which periodically met between the regular bi-annual sessions of the state legislature. He also sat on the Natural Resources Subcommittee.

Jones was regarded as one of the most fiscally conservative members of the Oregon legislature during his time of service there. Jones would later recall that he was "tighter than the bark on a tree" when handling the state's money and opined that the state "didn't waste a dollar" on his financial watch.

=== Death and legacy ===
Jones was born eight days before the first Pendleton Roundup was held in 1910 and was consequently an honored guest at the event's 100th anniversary celebration in 2010. Jones rode atop a restored stagecoach in a parade held to mark the opening of the event, waving to the crowd.

The Oregon State Legislature declared May 26, 2011, to be "Denny Jones Day" in honor of the centenarian legislative veteran. Jones met with Oregon Governor John Kitzhaber as well as top Republican and Democratic leaders of the Oregon House of Representatives and State Senate and was escorted to the floor of both houses for the reading of ceremonial resolutions. Jones was also feted with a mid-day chuck wagon lunch at the capitol, attended by former Oregon Governor Victor Atiyeh.

Jones died April 25, 2012, at his home in Ontario, Oregon.

At the time of his death Jones was remembered by Oregon Congressman Greg Walden, a former legislative colleague:

"Denny defined Eastern Oregon. He spoke little but said so much. He always called it as he saw it, and never wavered from his conservative principles. His word was better than a written contract."

Among Jones' numerous family survivors were four great-great grandchildren.
