= Wayne H. Fawbush =

American politician

Wayne Fawbush

Member of the Oregon Senate from the 23rd district
- In office 1989–1993
- Preceded by: Kenneth Jernstedt
- Succeeded by: Wes Cooley

Member of the Oregon House of Representatives from the 56th district
- In office 1977–1989
- Preceded by: Paul Walden
- Succeeded by: Greg Walden

Personal details
- Born: Wayne Harvey Fawbush; March 17, 1944 (age 82) Hood River, Oregon, U.S.
- Party: Democratic
- Education: University of Oregon

Military service
- Allegiance: United States of America
- Branch/service: United States Air Force
- Rank: captain
- Battles/wars: Vietnam War

Wayne Harvey Fawbush (born March 17, 1944) is an American politician who served as a member of the Oregon House of Representatives and Oregon State Senate.

== Early life and education ==
Fawbush was born in Hood River, Oregon. He graduated from the University of Oregon.

== Career ==
Fawbush owned and operated a commercial farm in Hood River, Oregon where he grew pears and blueberries. He served with the United States Air Force during the Vietnam War. During the Clinton administration, he was a member of the Senior Executive Service assigned as Deputy for Program Operations for the Farmers Home Administration at the United States Department of Agriculture. He served as the first director of the Vermont Sustainable Jobs Fund. He was also a program officer at the Ford Foundation.
