= Jeff Gilmour =

American politician

Jeffery Lynn Gilmour
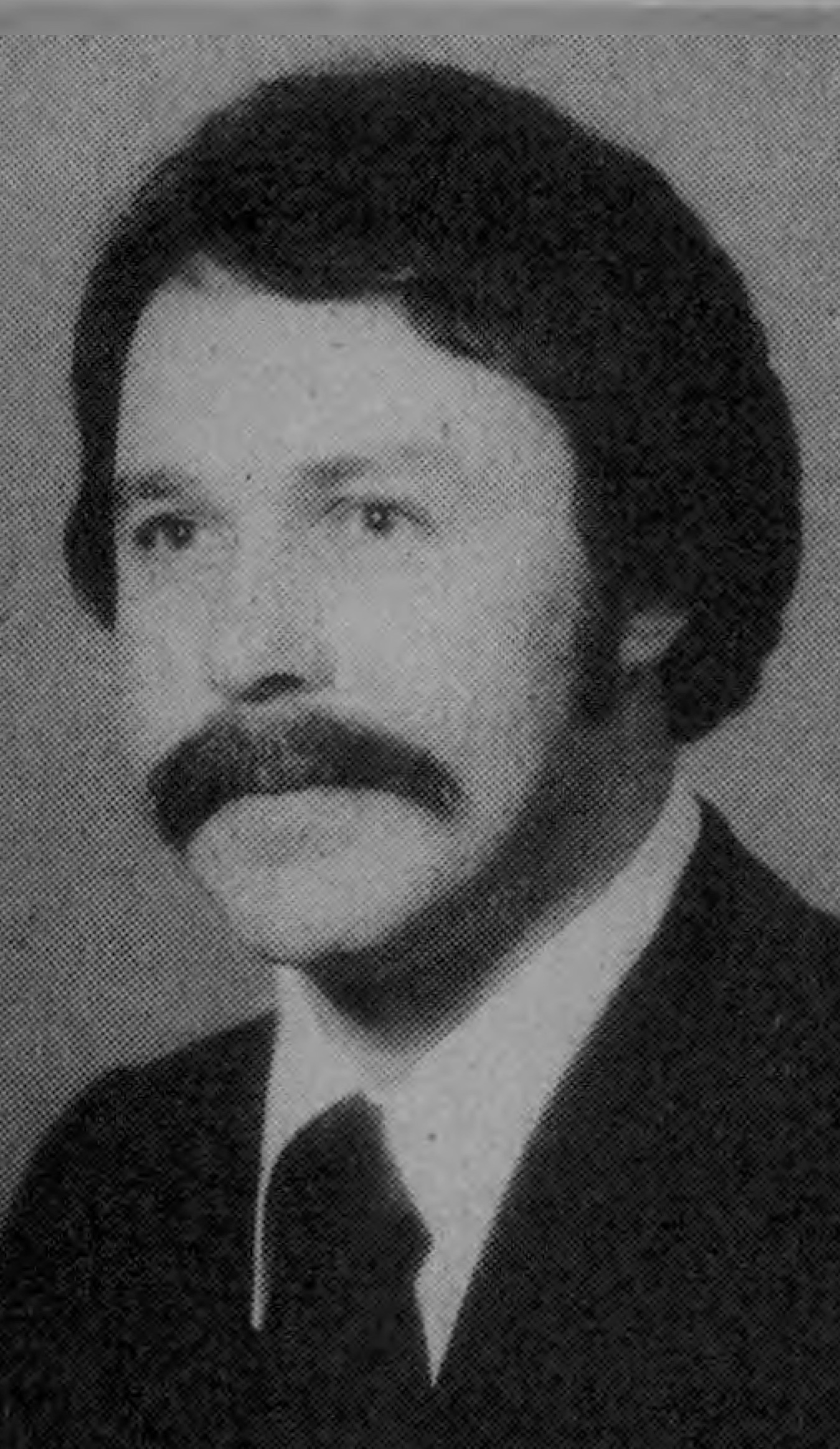

Member of the Oregon House of Representatives from the 30th district
- In office 1973–1993

Personal details
- Born: December 28, 1947 (age 78) Salem, Oregon, United States
- Party: Democratic
- Profession: Farmer

Jeff Gilmour (born December 28, 1947) is a former American politician and member of the Oregon House of Representatives. He is a farmer.
