= Eldon Johnson =

American politician

Member of the Oregon House of Representatives from the 51st district
- In office September 6, 1977 – January 10, 1999
- Preceded by: Brad Morris
- Succeeded by: Jason Atkinson

Personal details
- Born: August 16, 1930 West Point, Nebraska
- Died: September 4, 2015 (aged 85)
- Party: Republican
- Spouse: Barbara Johnson
- Profession: businessman (plumbing, electrical supplies)

Eldon Quinn Johnson (August 16, 1930 – September 4, 2015) was an American politician who was a Republican member of the Oregon House of Representatives. He was appointed in September 1977 to fill the House District 51 seat (representing Medford) vacated by Representative Brad Morris. He was unable to continue to serve in Oregon Legislature due to terms limits enacted by voters in the 1992 General Election, later ruled unconstitutional by the Oregon Supreme Court in 2002. His 11th and final term in office ended January 10, 1999. Johnson was born in West Point, Nebraska and attended school in Tucson, Arizona. He was an electrical and plumbing supply company owner, tile setter and farmer. He also served in the United States Air Force.
