= Bill Markham =

American politician (1922–2021)

Member of the Oregon House of Representatives from the 46th district
- In office 1969–1999

Personal details
- Born: William Edwin Markham; October 9, 1922 Chehalis, Washington, US
- Died: April 5, 2021 (aged 98)
- Party: Republican
- Education: University of Washington
- Profession: construction, timber, logging

William Edwin Markham (October 9, 1922 – April 5, 2021) was an American politician who was a member of the Oregon House of Representatives. He served from 1969 to 1999 as a Republican. Markham was a small business owner in the construction, timber and logging industry. He held a business degree from the University of Washington. He died at the age of 98 in 2021.
