= Clifford W. Trow =

American politician (1929–2023)

Member of the Oregon Senate from the 18th district
- In office 1975–1995

Personal details
- Born: July 27, 1929 Topeka, Kansas, U.S.
- Died: October 31, 2023 (aged 94)
- Party: Democratic
- Spouse: Jo Anne
- Profession: Historian, professor

Clifford Wayne Trow (July 27, 1929 – October 31, 2023) was an American politician who was a member of the Oregon State Senate.

== Life and career ==
Trow was born in Topeka, Kansas on July 27, 1929. He was a history professor at Oregon State University, serving for 31 years. Trow died on October 31, 2023, at the age of 94.
