= Tony Van Vliet (American politician) =

American politician

Member of the Oregon House of Representatives from the 35th district
- In office 1974–1995

Personal details
- Born: January 11, 1930 (age 96) San Francisco, California
- Party: Republican
- Profession: professor

Antone Cornelius (Tony) Van Vliet (born January 11, 1930) was an American politician who was a member of the Oregon House of Representatives.

He was born in San Francisco, California and attended Oregon State University, earning a bachelor of science degree in forestry and masters of science degree in wood science. He later attended Michigan State University, earning a Ph.D. in forest products in 1970. He then worked as a professor at Oregon State's forestry department from 1995 to 1990. At Oregon State, he also was associate director, and later director of the Career Planning and Placement Center
