= 66th Oregon Legislative Assembly =

Legislative Assembly in Oregon, USA

←	65th Legislative Assembly	67th Legislative Assembly	→
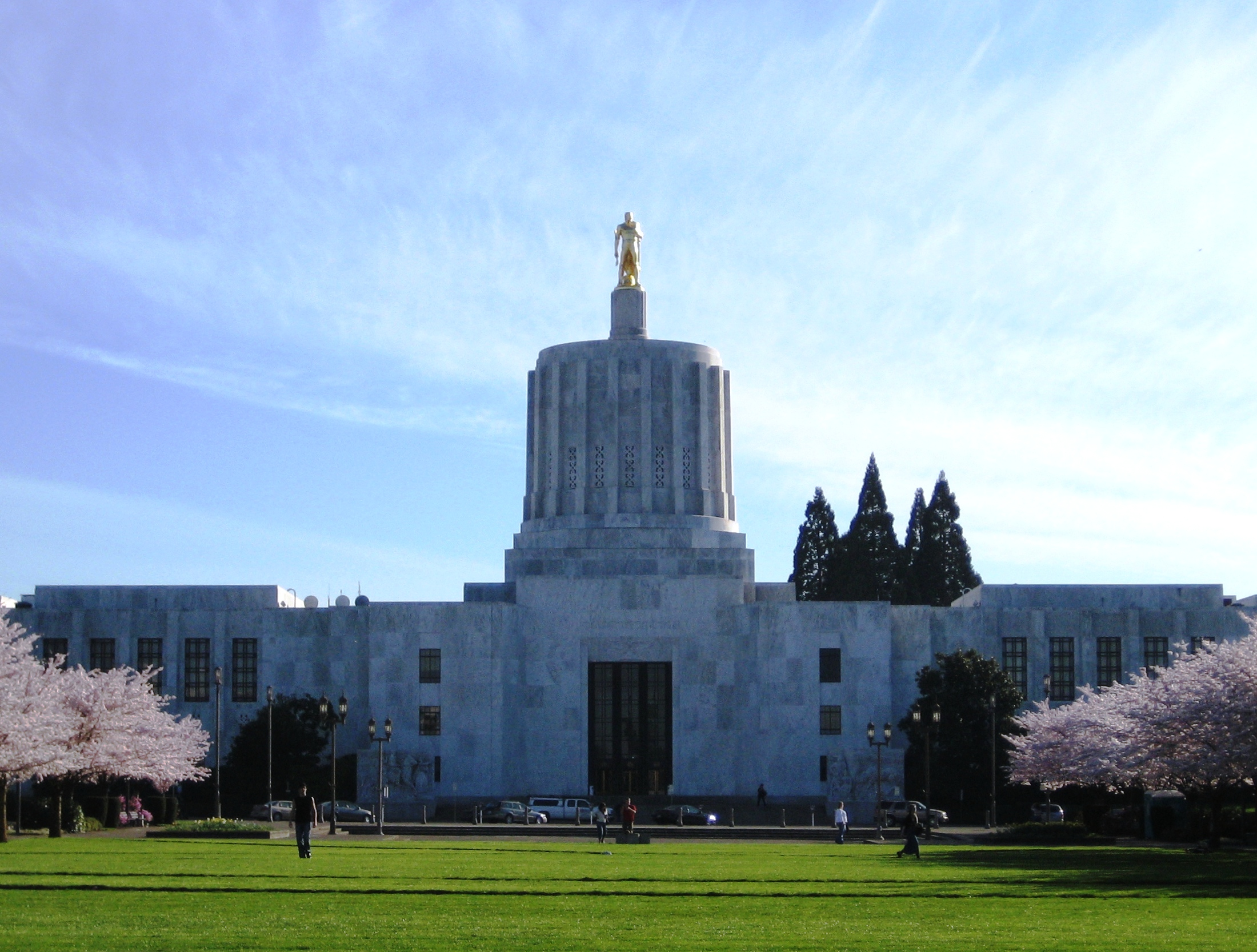
- The legislature took place in the Oregon State Capitol, seen here in 2007

Overview
- Legislative body: Oregon Legislative Assembly
- Jurisdiction: Oregon, United States
- Meeting place: Oregon State Capitol
- Term: 1991
- Website: www.oregonlegislature.gov

Oregon State Senate
- Members: 30 Senators
- Senate President: John Kitzhaber (D)
- Majority Leader: Bill Bradbury (D)
- Minority Leader: John Brenneman (R)
- Party control: Democratic Party of Oregon

Oregon House of Representatives
- Members: 60 Representatives
- Speaker of the House: Larry Campbell (R)
- Majority Leader: Greg Walden (R)
- Minority Leader: Peter Courtney (D)
- Party control: Republican Party of Oregon

The 66th Oregon Legislative Assembly was the legislative session of the Oregon Legislative Assembly that convened on January 14, 1991, and adjourned June 30, 1991. It was held at the Oregon State Capitol in Salem. Democratic members held majorities over the Republican members in both the Senate (20–10) and the House of Representatives (27–33). It was the first time since the 61st Assembly, as well as the most recent legislature as of 2026, in which either party held a two-thirds supermajority in the State Senate.

== Senate ==
Affiliation	Members
Democratic	20
Republican	10
Total	30
Government Majority	10

Jane Cease resigned July 31, 1991 to accept appointment as Administrator of Motor Vehicle Division; Ron Cease was appointed by Multnomah County Commissioners to fill the vacancy on August 22, 1991. Mike Thorne resigned January 17, 1991 to accept his appointment as Director of the Port of Portland; Scott Duff was appointed on February 17, 1991, to fill the vacancy. Larry Hill resigned November 1, 1991, to become a lobbyist; Bill Dwyer was appointed by Lane County Commissioners to the seat on November 26, 1991.

== Senate Members ==
Composition of the Senate
District	Senator	Party
1	Joan Dukes	Democratic
2	John Brenneman	Republican
3	Robert C. Shoemaker	Democratic
4	Paul Phillips	Republican
5	Jeannette Hamby	Republican
6	Richard Samuel Springer	Democratic
7	Shirley Gold	Democratic
8	Bill McCoy	Democratic
9	Frank L. Roberts	Democratic
10	Jane Cease, Ron Cease	Democratic
11	Glenn Edward Otto	Democratic
12	Bill Kennemer	Republican
13	Joyce Cohen	Democratic
14	Bob Kintigh	Republican
15	Jim Bunn	Republican
16	Jim A. Hill	Democratic
17	Tricia Smith	Democratic
18	Clifford W. Trow	Democratic
19	Mae Yih	Democratic
20	Grattan Kerans	Democratic
21	Bill Dwyer, Larry Hill	Democratic
22	Peggy Jolin	Democratic
23	John Kitzhaber	Democratic
24	Bill Bradbury (Majority Leader)	Democratic
25	Ronald D. Grensky	Republican
26	Lenn Hannon	Republican
27	Peter Marik Brockman	Republican
28	Wayne H. Fawbush	Democratic
29	Scott Duff, Mike Thorne	Democratic
30	Gene Timms	Republican

== House ==
Affiliation	Members
Democratic	27
Republican	33
Total	60
Government Majority	5

Judy Bauman resigned on November 1, 1991, to accept appointment as Administrator of the Community Services Division. Kate Brown was appointed on November 26, 1991, to fill the vacancy. Tom Brian changed parties, from a Democrat to Republican on September 5, 1991. Ronald Cease resigned from House and was appointed to the Senate on August 22, 1991. Avel Gordly was appointed on September 30, 1991, to fill the vacancy. William Dwyer resigned from the House and was appointed to Senate on December 4, 1991. Lee Beyer was appointed December 30, 1991 to fill the vacancy. Bob Pickard changed parties from Republican to Democrat on September 12, 1991. Gail Shibley was appointed on January 16, 1991, to fill the vacancy of Phil Keisling who resigned from the sixty-fifth legislative assembly on January 14, 1991.

== House Members ==
Composition of the House
District	House Member	Party
1	Bruce Hugo	Democratic
2	Jacqueline S. Taylor	Democratic
3	Timothy E. Josi	Democratic
4	Hedy Rijken	Democratic
5	John E. Meek	Republican
6	Delna Jones	Republican
7	Ted Calouri	Republican
8	Mary Alice Ford	Republican
9	Tom Brian	Changed from Democrat to Republican Midterm on September 5
10	Vera Katz	Democratic
11	Thomas L. Mason	Democratic
12	Gail Shibley, Phil Keisling	Democratic
13	Judith Bauman, Kate Brown	Democratic
14	Beverly Stein	Democratic
15	Lisa H. Naito	Democratic
16	Tom Novick	Democratic
17	Mike Burton	Democratic
18	Margaret Carter	Democratic
19	Ronald Cease, Avel Gordly	Democratic
20	John Minnis	Republican
21	Lonnie J. Roberts	Democratic
22	Ron P. Sunseri	Republican
23	Robert R. Shiprack	Democratic
24	Randy Miller	Republican
25	Dave McTeague	Democratic
26	Larry Sowa	Democratic
27	Kelly Clark Jr.	Republican
28	Fred Parkinson	Republican
29	Stan Bunn	Republican
30	Jeff Gilmour	Democratic
31	Gene Derfler	Republican
32	Kevin Mannix	Democratic
33	Peter Courtney (Minority Leader)	Democratic
34	John Schoon	Republican
35	Tony Van Vliet	Republican
36	Carolyn L. Oakley	Republican
37	Liz VanLeeuwen	Republican
38	Cedric Ross Hayden	Republican
39	Jim Edmunson	Democratic
40	Carl Hosticka	Democratic
41	Marie D. Bell	Republican
42	William J. Dwyer, Lee Beyer	Democratic
43	Larry Campbell (Speaker)	Republican
44	Sam Dominy	Democratic
45	Ron Johnson	Republican
46	Bill Markham	Republican
47	Jim Whitty	Democratic
48	Walter G. Schroeder	Republican
49	Bob Repine	Republican
50	John W. Watt	Republican
51	Eldon Johnson	Republican
52	Jerry Barnes	Republican
53	Del Parks	Republican
54	Bob Pickard	Changed parties from Republican to Democrat on September 12
55	Bev Clarno	Republican
56	Greg Walden (Majority Leader)	Republican
57	Charles R. Norris	Republican
58	Raymond Baum	Republican
59	Michael R. Nelson	Democratic
60	Denny Jones	Republican
