= Oregon's 10th Senate district =

American legislative district

Oregon's 10th Senate District as of September 27, 2021

District 10 of the Oregon State Senate comprises parts of Marion and Polk counties, including much of south and west Salem as well as Independence and Monmouth. The district is composed of Oregon House districts 19 and 20.

In 2018, Republican Jackie Winters of Salem was elected to this seat, but she died in office of lung cancer on May 29, 2019. Republican Denyc Boles, who had been serving as the Representative for District 19 in the Oregon House of Representatives, was appointed on June 25, 2019 as Winters's replacement. However, during the 2020 election, Democrat Deb Patterson of Salem ousted her in to fulfill the remainder of Jackie Winters's term. She is still the current senator representing this district.

== Election results ==
District boundaries have changed over time. Therefore, senators before 2021 may not represent the same constituency as today. From 1993 until 2003, the district covered parts of east Portland. Since 2003, the district has covered similar portions of the Salem metropolitan area, though the district has shifted slightly in redistricting in both 2013 and 2023, most significantly losing the Fruitland, Four Corners, and Sunnyside neighborhoods of Salem as well as Turner, and Aumsville in 2023 redistricting while gaining more of downtown Salem.

The results are as follows:

| Year | Candidate | Party | Percent | Opponent | Party | Percent | Opponent | Party | Percent |
|---|---|---|---|---|---|---|---|---|---|
| 1984 | Jane Cease | Democratic | 100.0% | Unopposed | | | | | |
| 1988 | Jane Cease | Democratic | 100.0% | Unopposed | | | | | |
| 1992 | Ron Cease | Democratic | 86.2% | Ed Marlhart | Libertarian | 13.8% | No third candidate | | |
| 1996 | Avel Gordly | Democratic | 72.6% | Everett Hall | Republican | 27.4% | No third candidate | | |
| 2000 | Avel Gordly | Democratic | 84.5% | Roy Burkett | Constitution | 14.5% | No third candidate | | |
| 2002 | Jackie Winters | Republican | 54.6% | Bryan Johnston | Democratic | 45.4% | No third candidate | | |
| 2006 | Jackie Winters | Republican | 53.6% | Paul Evans | Democratic | 46.2% | No third candidate | | |
| 2010 | Jackie Winters | Republican | 68.4% | Jackie Pierce | Democratic | 31.3% | No third candidate | | |
| 2014 | Jackie Winters | Republican | 86.6% | Glen E. Ewert | Libertarian | 12.1% | No third candidate | | |
| 2018 | Jackie Winters | Republican | 53.9% | Deb Patterson | Democratic | 45.9% | No third candidate | | |
| 2020 (Note: Off-cycle election due to the death of Jackie Winters in office on May 29, 2019. Denyc Boles was the incumbent as she was appointed to the seat.) | Deb Patterson | Democratic | 48.5% | Denyc Boles | Republican | 47.8% | Taylor Rickey | Libertarian | 3.6% |
| 2022 | Deb Patterson | Democratic | 53.4% | Raquel Moore-Green | Republican | 46.5% | No third candidate | | |
