= Vicki Berger =

American politician

Member of the Oregon House of Representatives from the 20th District
- In office 2003–2015
- Preceded by: Jackie Winters
- Succeeded by: Paul Evans
- Constituency: Marion County; Polk County

Personal details
- Born: 1949 (age 76–77) Salem, Oregon
- Party: Republican
- Spouse: Jerry Berger
- Children: 3
- Education: University of Wyoming
- Profession: Business person

Vicki Berger (born 1949) is an American businessperson and politician in the state of Oregon. A native Oregonian, she is a Salem civic leader and a former Republican member of the Oregon House of Representatives. Her father, Richard Chambers, came up with the idea for the Oregon Bottle Bill.

== Early life ==
Born Vicki Chambers in 1949, she was the youngest of three children of Richard Chambers. In 1967, she graduated from South Salem High School in the state's capital city before she married Jerry Berger in 1969. The couple had three children, and she earned a Bachelor of Arts degree in anthropology in 1974 from the University of Wyoming.

From 1972 to 1975, Berger worked as a bailiff for the county court. She taught racquetball at Chemeketa Community College in the early 1980s and then as a project manager for a local manufacturing company from 1988 to 1995. That year she became a franchisee of a Lazerquick copy shop in West Salem, retaining ownership until 2000.

== Civic leader ==
In 1985, she joined the board of the Salem YMCA where she remained until 1998. From 1995 to 1998 she served as that organization's first female president. Berger was on the Salem-Keizer School District board from 1988 to 1992 and helped lead the campaign for a bond measure for capital improvements in what is the state's second largest school district. In 2001, along with her husband, she shared the award as First Citizens from the local chamber of commerce.

== Political career ==
In August 2001, Berger announced she would run for a seat in the Oregon House of Representatives. In the May 2002, primary she defeated Greg Warnock and Irv Blake to win the Republican nomination. Berger defeated Democrat Lloyd Kumley in the November general election with 13,408 votes to 7,884. She joined the House beginning with the 2003 session representing District 20, which spans parts of Polk and Marion counties.

After running unopposed in the May 2004 primary, she beat Democrat Jeanne E. Deane 17,595 votes to 11,400 votes in general election. Berger again ran without competition in the Republican primary in 2006, and then beat her Democratic Party opponent Connie Garcia, collecting 13,382 votes to Garcia's 9,040. During the 2007 to 2008 legislature she served on the Revenue Committee. In 2007, she worked to pass legislation to amend the Oregon Bottle Bill to require deposits on water bottles. Her father, Richard Chambers, was the person responsible for proposing the original bill that passed the Oregon Legislature in 1971.

She was the first Republican in the House to vote in favor of an increase in the tax on cigarettes to pay for more health insurance of children in 2007. Seeking a fourth term in 2008, Berger was unopposed in the May primary, and then defeated Richard Riggs in the November election to win another term. Her district covers parts of Salem, Independence, and Monmouth, and switched from a primarily Republican district to a primarily Democratic district in 2008. Berger is considered a moderate Republican whose votes are occasionally inline with the Democrats. Berger calls herself a fiscally conservative and business-oriented politician. In 2008, she became the first person in the Oregon House to be cross-nominated by the Independent Party of Oregon.

Berger did not run for reelection in 2014. Her seat was the only one to change party control in the Oregon House of Representatives that year, with Democrat Paul Evans, a former mayor of Monmouth, defeating Republican candidate Kathy Goss. In 2017, following her departure from the Oregon House of Representatives, Berger was appointed to the Oregon Parks and Recreation Department Commission. She served two terms on this Commission, representing Oregon’s Fifth Congressional District. Berger later served as the Chair of the Oregon State Fair Council. While she continues to serve as a council member, she was succeeded by a new chair in January 2024.

== Electoral history ==
2004 Oregon State Representative, 20th district
Party	Candidate	Votes	%
Republican	Vicki Berger	17,595	60.5
Democratic	Jeanne E. Deane	11,400	39.2
Write-in		97	0.3
Total votes		29,092	100%

2006 Oregon State Representative, 20th district
Party	Candidate	Votes	%
Republican	Vicki Berger	13,382	59.5
Democratic	Connie Garcia	9,040	40.2
Write-in		79	0.4
Total votes		22,501	100%

2008 Oregon State Representative, 20th district
Party	Candidate	Votes	%
Republican	Vicki Berger	15,826	54.5
Democratic	Richard Riggs	13,138	45.2
Write-in		87	0.3
Total votes		29,051	100%

2010 Oregon State Representative, 20th district
Party	Candidate	Votes	%
Republican	Vicki Berger	15,143	63.0
Democratic	Mike Powers	8,816	36.7
Write-in		70	0.3
Total votes		24,029	100%

2012 Oregon State Representative, 20th district
Party	Candidate	Votes	%
Republican	Vicki Berger	16,745	62.6
Democratic	Jackie Pierce	9,916	37.0
Write-in		103	0.4
Total votes		26,764	100%
