= Bud Pierce =

American physician and politician (born 1956)

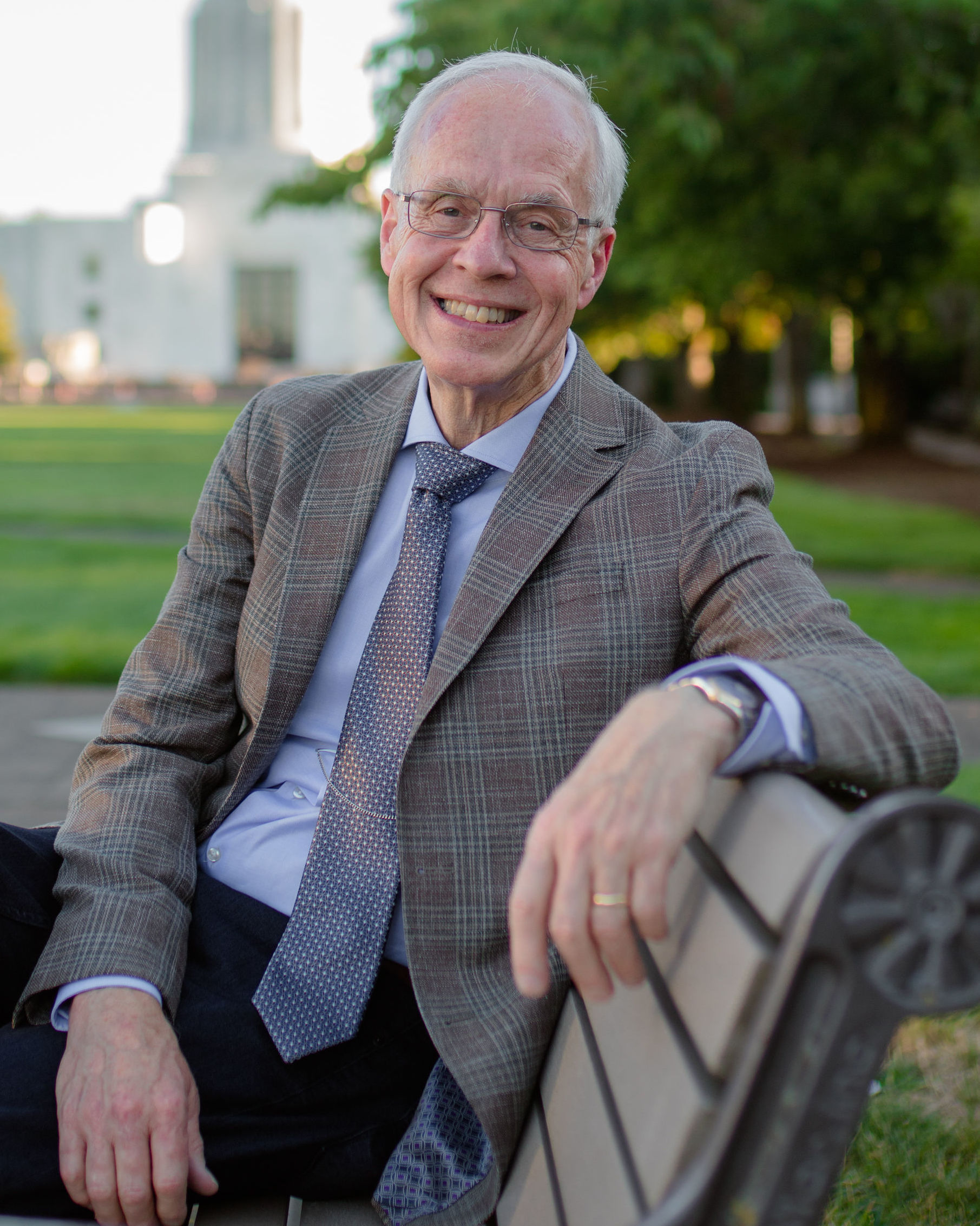

Personal details
- Born: October 3, 1956 (age 70) Wiesbaden, West Germany
- Party: Republican
- Spouse: Selma Moon (m. 1981; died 2020)
- Children: 2
- Education: University of California, Riverside (BS); University of California, Los Angeles (MS, PhD, MD)

Military service
- Allegiance: United States
- Branch/service: United States Marine Corps; United States Navy Reserve
- Years of service: 1979–1985 (Active); 1989–1997 (Reserve)
- Unit: United States Marine Corps Reserve

William C. "Bud" Pierce (born October 3, 1956) is an American physician and politician. He was the Republican nominee for Governor of Oregon in the 2016 special election.

== Early life and career ==
Pierce was born in Germany and raised in Riverside County, California. His father worked as a public school custodian and his mother was a homemaker. He graduated from Moreno Valley High School in 1974 and attended college at the University of California, Riverside, graduating in 1979, and medical school at the University of California, Los Angeles, receiving a Ph.D. in 1985 and M.D. in 1987. He served in the United States Marine Corps Reserve from 1979 to 1985, and moved to Salem, Oregon in 1994, where he currently works as an oncologist and hematologist. Pierce is also a clinical assistant professor of medicine at Oregon Health & Science University and College of Osteopathic Medicine of the Pacific, Northwest.

== Political career ==
=== 2016 gubernatorial election ===
In March 2015, Pierce announced he would explore a campaign for governor. He won the Republican primary for governor on May 17, 2016, and received about 48% of the vote, defeating his closest challenger, businessman Allen Alley, by nearly 20 points. Pierce faced incumbent governor Kate Brown in the general election in November.

In May 2016, Pierce endorsed Republican presidential nominee Donald Trump. However, in September he released a statement stating he "was hopeful that Donald Trump would rise to the occasion and unify the party and nation during the general election. As each day goes by, more of the opposite has taken place. At this point in time I need to see more from Donald Trump in the way of specific policy proposals and a more inclusive tone in order to vote for him." Following the release of video footage showing Donald Trump making lewd comments about women, Pierce condemned the comments, stating, "Mr. Trump's comments are degrading, unbecoming, and unacceptable, period."

In September 2016, during a debate with Kate Brown, Pierce generated controversy and boos from the audience for saying educated women are less susceptible to domestic abuse. He later apologized for his remarks.

On November 8, 2016, Pierce lost to Brown, receiving 43% of the vote.

=== 2022 gubernatorial election ===
On November 30, 2020, Pierce announced he would be once again running for governor in the 2022 election. In his announcement, he criticized Governor Brown (who was term limited in 2022), saying, "Oregon is currently suffering under the guidance of an oppressive and poorly performing governor." Pierce lost the primary to Christine Drazan, who went on to lose the general election to Tina Kotek.

== Political positions ==
Pierce opposed Oregon Ballot Measure 97 in 2016. It would have imposed a gross receipts tax on C Corporations with sales exceeding $25 million. In 2016, Pierce called for a more moderate Oregon Republican Party.

He is against vaccine mandates saying in February 2022, regarding COVID-19 deaths, "Most of those were 65 and over, past working age. Few people of working age have died, and society shouldn’t be brought to a halt." "It’s time to end the mandates."

== Personal life ==
Pierce married Selma Moon Pierce on June 6, 1981. The couple had two children and attended Salem First Christian Church in Salem, Oregon. Selma Pierce was also involved in politics; she ran for Oregon's 20th House district in 2018 and 2020, losing both times to Democrat Paul Evans. Selma died after being struck by a car in Salem in 2020.

== Electoral history ==
Republican primary results by county. Red indicates a win by Pierce, yellow a win by Alley.

Oregon gubernatorial special election, 2016 Republican primary
Party	Candidate	Votes	%
Republican	Bud Pierce	171,158	47.66
Republican	Allen Alley	103,388	28.79
Republican	Bruce Cuff	41,598	11.58
Republican	Bob Niemeyer	35,669	9.93
Republican	Bob Forthan	4,290	1.19
Republican	Write-ins	3,020	0.84
Total votes		359,123	100
Democratic	Kate Brown	1,008,558	50.90%
Republican	Bud Pierce	854,924	43.14%
Independent Party	Cliff Thomason	48,262	2.44%
Libertarian	James Foster	46,049	2.32%
Constitution	Aaron Donald Auer	19,537	0.99%
	write-ins	4,281	0.22%
Total votes		1,981,611	100.00%

Oregon gubernatorial election, 2022 Republican primary
Party	Candidate	Votes	%
Republican	Christine Drazan	85,255	22.99
Republican	Bob Tiernan	66,089	17.82
Republican	Stan Pulliam	41,123	11.09
Republican	Bridget Barton	40,886	11.02
Republican	Bud Pierce	32,965	8.89
Republican	Marc Thielman	30,076	8.12
Republican	Kerry McQuisten	28,727	7.74
Republican	Bill Sizemore	13,261	3.57
Republican	Jessica Gomez	9,970	2.69
Republican	Tim McCloud	4,400	1.19
Republican	Nick Hess	4,287	1.15
Republican	Court Boice	4,040	1.09
Republican	Brandon Merritt	3,615	0.97
Republican	Reed Christensen	3,042	0.82
Republican	Amber Richardson	1,924	0.52
Republican	Raymond Baldwin	459	0.12
Republican	David Burch	406	0.11
Republican	John Presco	174	0.05
Republican	Stefan Strek	171	0.05
Total votes		370,910	100

Party political offices
Preceded by Dennis Richardson	Republican nominee for Governor of Oregon; 2016	Succeeded by Knute Buehler
