= Raquel Moore-Green =

American politician

Member of the Oregon House of Representatives from the 19th district
- In office July 23, 2019 – 2023
- Preceded by: Denyc Boles
- Succeeded by: Tom Andersen

Personal details
- Party: Republican

Raquel Moore-Green is an American politician from the state of Oregon. A Republican, she was a member of the Oregon House of Representatives, appointed on July 23, 2019 by the Marion County Commission to replace Denyc Boles, after she was appointed to replace Jackie Winters in the Senate. She represented House District 19 which included Turner, Aumsville, and parts of Salem.

Moore-Green had previously worked on local campaigns, served as a legislative assistant, and owns a small business.

== Electoral history ==
2020 Oregon State Representative, 19th district
Party	Candidate	Votes	%
Republican	Raquel Moore-Green	20,659	54.4
Democratic	Jacqueline M Leung	17,253	45.4
Write-in		86	0.2
Total votes		37,998	100%

2022 Oregon State Senator, 10th district
Party	Candidate	Votes	%
Democratic	Deb Patterson	32,007	53.4
Republican	Raquel Moore-Green	27,853	46.5
Write-in		83	0.1
Total votes		59,943	100%
