= Bill Hansell =

American politician

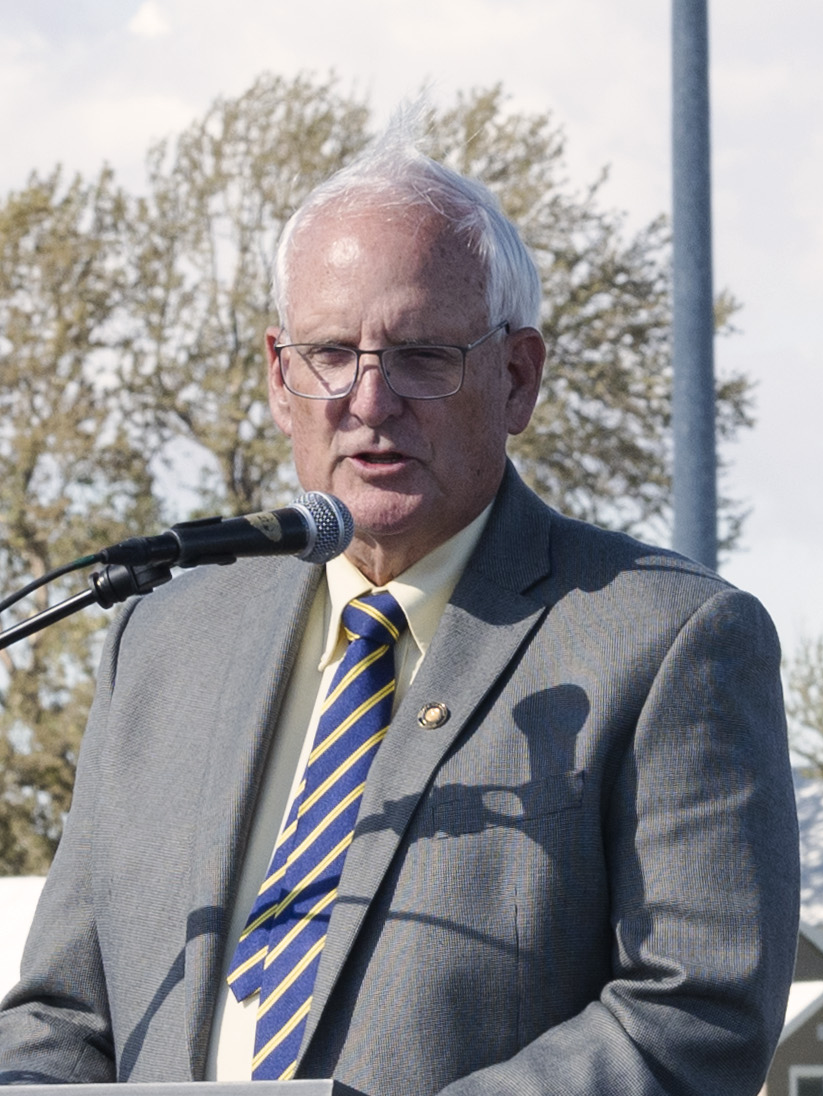

Member of the Oregon State Senate from the 29th district
- In office 2013 – January 13, 2025
- Preceded by: David Nelson
- Succeeded by: Todd Nash

Personal details
- Born: January 23, 1945 (age 81) Athena, Oregon, U.S.
- Party: Republican
- Spouse: Margaret (Eversaul) Hansell
- Education: University of Oregon
- Occupation: Politician; farmer

William S. Hansell is an American politician, farmer, and minister from Oregon. He served over four decades in local and state government positions including eight terms as an Umatilla County commissioner and three four-terms in the Oregon State Senate, representing a large rural district in eastern Oregon. As a young man, he spent twelve years as an evangelical Christian missionary in California and Australia.

== Early life ==
Hansell was born on January 23, 1945, in Athena, Oregon. He grew up on a farm in Umatilla County, Oregon. His family has been farming in that area for four generations. The family's farm has two parcels, one near Hermiston where they raised potatoes and the other near Athena, where they grow dryland wheat.

Hansell attended University of Oregon, earning a degree in political science. He was well-known on campus and was elected senior class president. While at the university, he married fellow student Margaret Eversaul. After receiving his degree, he went on to Harvard University where he earned a certificate from the John F. Kennedy School of Government.

After college, he became involved in Campus Crusade for Christ, a non-denominational Christian ministry. He and his wife spent seven years serving as evangelical missionaries in Berkley and Sacramento, California. He then became the national campus director for the organization's mission in Australia, where he worked for five more years. In 1979, he returned to Oregon to work on his family's farm.

== Political career ==
Hansell was elected to the Umatilla County commission in 1982. He served as a county commissioner through 2012. While serving as a county commissioner, he was elected president of the Association of Oregon Counties and then president of the National Association of Counties. While on the board of the national organization, he testified before the United States Congress, advocating for agriculture and rural affairs legislation.

As the 2012 legislative session came to a close, the retiring state senator from District 29, David Nelson, encouraged Hansell to run for his seat. After some consideration, Hansell decided to seek the District 29 senate seat as a Republican. He won the District 29 senate seat in the 2012 election. He took his seat in January 2013. District 29 covers a large part of rural eastern Oregon, including Gilliam, Morrow, Wallowa, Sherman, Umatilla, and Union counties plus part of Wasco County. Geographically, the district is the second largest in the state. He was re-elected to the senate in 2016 and 2020.

He was a conservative Republican legislator who received a 100 percent score from the Oregon Chamber of Commerce in 2020. His career voting record received a 56 percent positive score from the American Conservative Union and a 37 percent career rating from the Oregon League of Conservation Voters. He earned 20 percent positive rating from the state government employees' labor union.

In 2019 and 2020, when the senate's Democratic majority scheduled floor votes on several controversial bill, Hansell joined fellow Republicans in two walkouts that shut down the senate due to a lack of quorum. On June 20, 2019, all 11 Republican state senators, including Hansell, walked out of the Oregon State Capitol, going into hiding or fleeing the state. Their aim was to prevent a vote on a cap-and-trade bill that was intended to lower greenhouse gas emissions by 2050 to combat climate change. The Senate had 30 seats with 1 vacant due to a death. Without the Republican senators, the remaining 18 Democratic senators could not reach a quorum of 20 to hold a vote.

In 2021, he opted not to walkout when Democrats pushed a controversial gun control bill through the legislature. Hansell and five other Republican senators decided to show up and vote on the bill. While all six Republicans opposed the bill, their presence in the chamber created a quorum. As a result, the bill came to a vote and was passed by a 16 to 7 margin with all six of the Republicans voting against the bill. After the vote, Hansell and the other Republican senators received anonymous death threats.

Over the course of his political career, Hansell was known for his strong conservative views, honest dealing, and genial manner. He championed natural resource stewardship, domestic violence issues, and cancer-related legislation. He actively supported Future Farmers of America and other youth programs. He also tried to get the legislature to designate the potato as the state vegetable.

He served on numerous committees during his time in the senate. This included the powerful joint emergency board, the joint ways and means committee, and the joint legislative administration committee. He also served on the senate's rules committee, environment and natural resources committee, labor and business committee, workforce committee, semiconductor committee, and redistricting committee.

In March 2023, Hansell announced that he would not run for re-election in 2024. He made the early announcement in order to give potential candidates time to prepare for a senate run. After making his retirement announcement, Hansell said he would not endorse a candidate until after the 2024 Republican primary.

While participating in a Republican-led walkout in May 2023 Hansell reached the 10 unexcused absence threshold set by measure 113, disqualifying him from running for reelection after his current term ends. After a challenge from five Republican Senators the measure was unanimously upheld by the Oregon Supreme Court on February 1, 2024, confirming Hansell's disqualification after the end of his term in January 2025.

== Personal life ==
Hansell is married to Margaret (Eversaul) Hansell. Together, they have six children and 11 grandchildren. He is a cancer survivor.

He is a member of the Oregon State Library board of trustees, Oregon Growth Board, Pacific Northwest Economic Region Energy and Environment Committee, the Hanford Clean-up Board, and chairman of the Umatilla Army Depot Reuse Authority. He is also a member of the Athena Baptist Church, Athena Chamber of Commerce, Weston Chamber of Commerce, and the Pendleton Salvation Army board of directors. In addition, he is a volunteer for 4-H youth programs and Future Farmers of America.

== Electoral history ==
2012 Oregon State Senator, 29th district
Party	Candidate	Votes	%
Republican	Bill Hansell	30,552	68.4
Democratic	Antone Minthorn	13,975	31.3
Write-in		108	0.2
Total votes		44,635	100%

2016 Oregon State Senator, 29th district
Party	Candidate	Votes	%
Republican	Bill Hansell	37,785	80.3
Independent	Barbara E Dickerson	9,114	19.4
Write-in		176	0.4
Total votes		47,075	100%

2020 Oregon State Senator, 29th district
Party	Candidate	Votes	%
Republican	Bill Hansell	45,084	75.9
Democratic	Mildred A O'Callaghan	14,214	23.9
Write-in		94	0.2
Total votes		59,392	100%
