= David Nelson (Oregon politician) =

American Republican politician

Member of the Oregon State Senate from the 29th district
- In office 1997–2013
- Preceded by: Gordon H. Smith
- Succeeded by: Bill Hansell

Personal details
- Born: August 6, 1941 (age 85) Pendleton, Oregon, U.S.
- Party: Republican
- Spouse: Alice
- Children: 4
- Education: University of California, Berkeley; University of Oregon (Bachelor's)
- Occupation: Politician

David Nelson (born August 6, 1941) is a Republican politician from the U.S. state of Oregon. He served four terms in the Oregon State Senate. He lives in Pendleton, and represented District 29.

== Early life and education ==
David Nelson was born in Pendleton, Oregon, United States. He attended the University of California at Berkeley, but then transferred to the University of Oregon, where he earned a bachelor's degree in Political Science in 1964. He then managed, and later purchased, a wheat farm in Brady, Montana. He earned a law degree from the University of Montana Law School in 1967.

== Political experience ==
Nelson was County Attorney for Pondera County, Montana for 1971-1975. He served as a senator in the Oregon State Senate from 1996 to 2013; and was Oregon State Senate Majority Leader in 2001.

== Organizations ==
David Nelson has been a member of the following organizations: American Bar Association, Babe Ruth Association, Eastern Oregon Symphony, Education Foundation of Pendleton, Oregon Wheat League, Pendleton Swim Association, and the Rotary Club

== Personal life ==
Nelson and his wife Alice have four children and four grandchildren.
