= 2016 Oregon Ballot Measure 97 =

Measure 97
- Increases corporate minimum tax when sales exceed $25 million; funds education, healthcare, senior services

Results
Choice	Votes	%
Yes	808,310	40.97%
No	1,164,658	59.03%
Total votes	1,972,968	100.00%
Results by county
Yes
50%-60%
No
50%-60%
60%-70%
70%-80%
80%-90%
- Source: Oregon Secretary of State

Oregon Ballot Measure 97 was a ballot measure in the 2016 election in the U.S. state of Oregon. The initiative asked voters to determine whether or not to impose a 2.5 percent gross receipts tax on C corporations with Oregon sales exceeding $25 million. S corporations and benefit companies (companies that benefit society and the environment, as determined under state law) would be exempt from the tax. It was estimated the measure would raise $3 billion annually for the state, if passed.

The nonpartisan Oregon Legislative Revenue Office determined that of the some 250,000 businesses registered in Oregon, 951 would be subject to the tax; of these, the hundred largest taxpayers would pay about two-thirds of the monies raised. The same report estimated that wholesale companies in Oregon would see their taxes grow by almost $600 million, a 583 percent increase. Taxes on Oregon retailers would increase by $535 million, a 766 percent jump. Health care firms operating in Oregon would experience a 1,211 percent increase in their taxes, adding almost $100 million per year to the cost of health care across the state.

During the state's general election held in November 2016, Oregon voters defeated the measure 59 percent (opposed) to 41 percent.

== Support and opposition ==
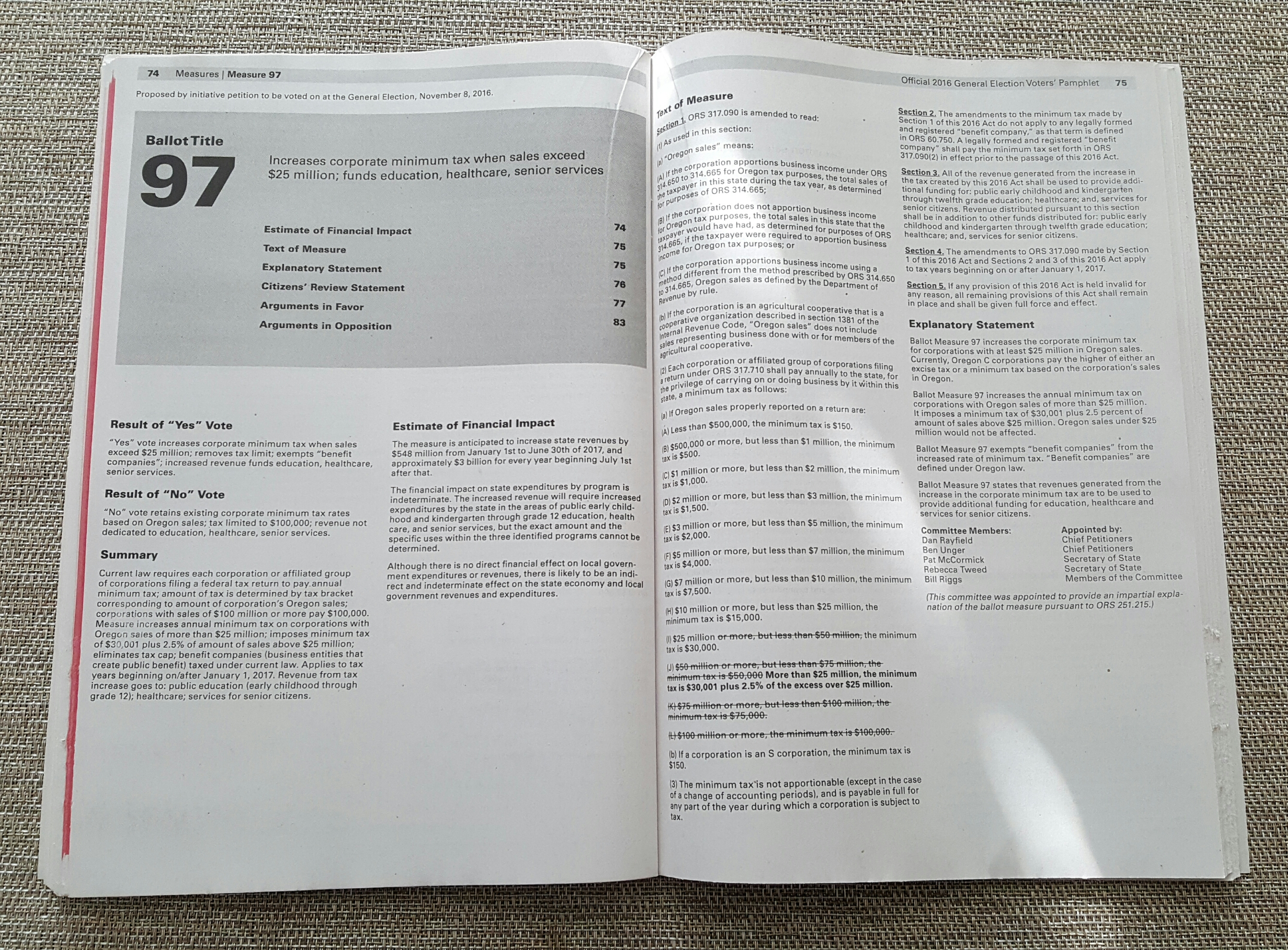
Listing in the 2016 voters' pamphlet

The campaigns for and against the ballot measure raised the most money ever over a ballot measure in Oregon. By the week before Election Day, combined fundraising for the two campaigns had reached $40 million. Opponents of the measure outspent proponents of the measure; the anti-Measure 97 campaign, the Defeat the Tax on Oregon Sales Committee, raised almost $26 million, while the pro-Measure 97 committee Yes on 97 raised $14 million. A separate pro-Measure 97 group, Defend Oregon, also raised funds in support of the measure's passage.

The major supporters of the Measure 97 were labor unions, and in particular the Oregon Education Association, the state's primary teachers' union, which contributed a total of $2.1 million to the campaign in support of Measure 97. The Service Employees International Union (SEIU) Local 503, which is "the largest union representing Oregon state government workers", gave almost $3 million to the pro-Measure 97 campaign. The American Federation of Teachers and the Oregon American Federation of State, County and Municipal Employees also contributed to the pro-Measure 97 campaign.

Major corporations mostly opposed the law. Companies and trade associations that contributed to the campaign against the measure include, among others, Amazon.com, General Motors, Kroger/Fred Meyer, J.P. Morgan Chase, Wal-Mart, Costco, Safeway/Albertsons, the Oregon Association of Realtors, Jive Software, Comcast, Pacific Seafood, and the Craft Brew Alliance.

Governor Kate Brown, a Democrat, supported the measure, while Brown's opponent in the 2016 gubernatorial election, Republican nominee William C. "Bud" Pierce, opposed the measure.

== Polling ==
A poll conducted by DHM Research during September 1–6 showed 60 percent of respondents were in favor of Measure 97, with 30 percent opposed. Another poll conducted by icitizen during September 2–7 found that 59 percent of 610 respondents were in favor of the measure passing, with 21 percent opposed. However, support decreased to 40 percent and opposition increased to 31 percent after participants heard arguments against Measure 97. The poll's margin of error was 4 percent.

Vote tallies by county:

County	No	Votes	Yes	Votes	Total
Baker	75.35	6,574	24.65	2,151	8,725
Benton	48.32	23,163	51.68	24,770	47,933
Clackamas	63.79	134,595	36.21	76,409	211,004
Clatsop	57.91	11,205	42.09	8,143	19,348
Columbia	68.08	17,958	31.92	8,419	26,377
Coos	68.84	21,396	31.16	9,686	31,082
Crook	80.16	9,736	19.84	2,409	12,145
Curry	60.32	7,438	39.68	4,893	12,331
Deschutes	66.14	64,682	33.86	33,116	97,798
Douglas	75.39	40,075	24.61	13,075	53,150
Gilliam	83.19	866	16.81	175	1,041
Grant	78.42	3,354	21.58	923	4,277
Harney	79.13	3,143	20.87	829	3,972
Hood River	50.78	5,489	49.22	5,320	10,809
Jackson	62.02	66,885	38.98	40,958	107,843
Jefferson	74.99	7,050	25.01	2,351	9,401
Josephine	66.37	29,184	33.63	14,786	43,970
Klamath	74.59	22,591	25.41	7,696	30,287
Lake	77.94	3,031	22.06	858	3,889
Lane	52.58	99,759	47.42	89,955	189,714
Lincoln	54.86	13,702	45.14	11,276	24,978
Linn	72.01	41,935	27.99	16,296	58,231
Malheur	69.57	7,088	30.43	3,101	10,189
Marion	65.28	88,569	34.72	47,099	135,668
Morrow	76.70	3,184	23.30	967	4,151
Multnomah	42.93	167,422	57.07	222,576	389,998
Polk	64.53	25,833	35.47	14,201	40,034
Sherman	88.96	911	11.04	113	1,024
Tillamook	64.69	8,851	35.31	4,832	13,683
Umatilla	66.74	18,063	33.26	8,999	27,062
Union	72.59	9,289	27.41	3,508	12,797
Wallowa	69.79	3,020	30.21	1,307	4,327
Wasco	67.19	7,943	32.81	3,879	11,822
Washington	59.11	156,510	40.89	108,253	264,763
Wheeler	78.68	646	21.32	175	821
Yamhill	69.36	33,518	30.64	14,806	48,324

== See also ==
- Corporate tax in the United States
- List of Oregon ballot measures
