= Deb Patterson (politician) =

American politician

Member of the Oregon State Senate from the 10th district

State Senator
- Incumbent
- Assumed office January 10, 2021
- Preceded by: Denyc Boles

Personal details
- Party: Democratic
- Website: https://www.oregonlegislature.gov/patterson

Deb Patterson is an American politician, former healthcare administrator, and ordained United Church of Christ minister who serves as a member of the Oregon State Senate from the 10th district. A Democrat, she first won the seat in a 2020 special election and won full terms in 2022 and 2026.

== Education ==
Patterson earned a bachelor's from Yankton College and a master's from the University of South Dakota. She also holds a Master of Health Administration from the Washington University School of Medicine in St. Louis and a master's and a doctorate from Eden Theological Seminary.

== Career in health care and ministry ==
Before entering public office, Patterson worked for more than two decades in healthcare administration. She was executive director of the International Parish Nurse Resource Center and of Northwest Parish Nurse Ministries in Portland, Oregon, and vice president of a children's health philanthropy.

She also served on the senior management team of a multi-hospital health system in the Midwest.

She has been an ordained United Church of Christ minister for more than 30 years and has served congregations in Missouri, Illinois, and Oregon, most recently Smyrna United Church of Christ in the Mid-Willamette Valley.

== Political career ==
In November 2018, Patterson ran against incumbent Republican state senator Jackie Winters and lost. After Winters died, Denyc Boles was appointed to the seat. On November 3, 2020, Patterson defeated Boles by 576 votes in a special general election. Patterson won re-election in 2022, defeating Republican State Representative Raquel Moore-Green by 4,154 votes.

Patterson has chaired the Senate Committee on Health care since 2021. Her legislation includes SB 844 (2021), which created a board to review prescription drug prices, SB 972 (2023), which requires the Oregon Health Authority to move the state's insurance marketplace to its own platform, SB 1508 (2024), which capped out-of-pocket insulin costs at $35 a month, and SB 951 (2025), restricting corporate involvement in medical practices.

== Electoral history ==
2018 Oregon State Senator, 10th district
Party	Candidate	Votes	%
Republican	Jackie Winters	33,145	53.9
Democratic	Deb Patterson	28,210	45.9
Write-in		135	0.2
Total votes		61,490	100%

2020 Oregon State Senator, 10th district
Party	Candidate	Votes	%
Democratic	Deb Patterson	37,725	48.5
Republican	Denyc Boles	37,149	47.8
Libertarian	Taylor A Rickey	2,775	3.6
Write-in		145	0.2
Total votes		77,794	100%

2022 Oregon State Senator, 10th district
Party	Candidate	Votes	%
Democratic	Deb Patterson	32,007	53.4
Republican	Raquel Moore-Green	27,853	46.5
Write-in		83	0.1
Total votes		59,943	100%
