= H. C. Keck House =

Historic building in Portland, Oregon, U.S.

- H. C. Keck House – Mount Olivet Parsonage
- U.S. National Register of Historic Places
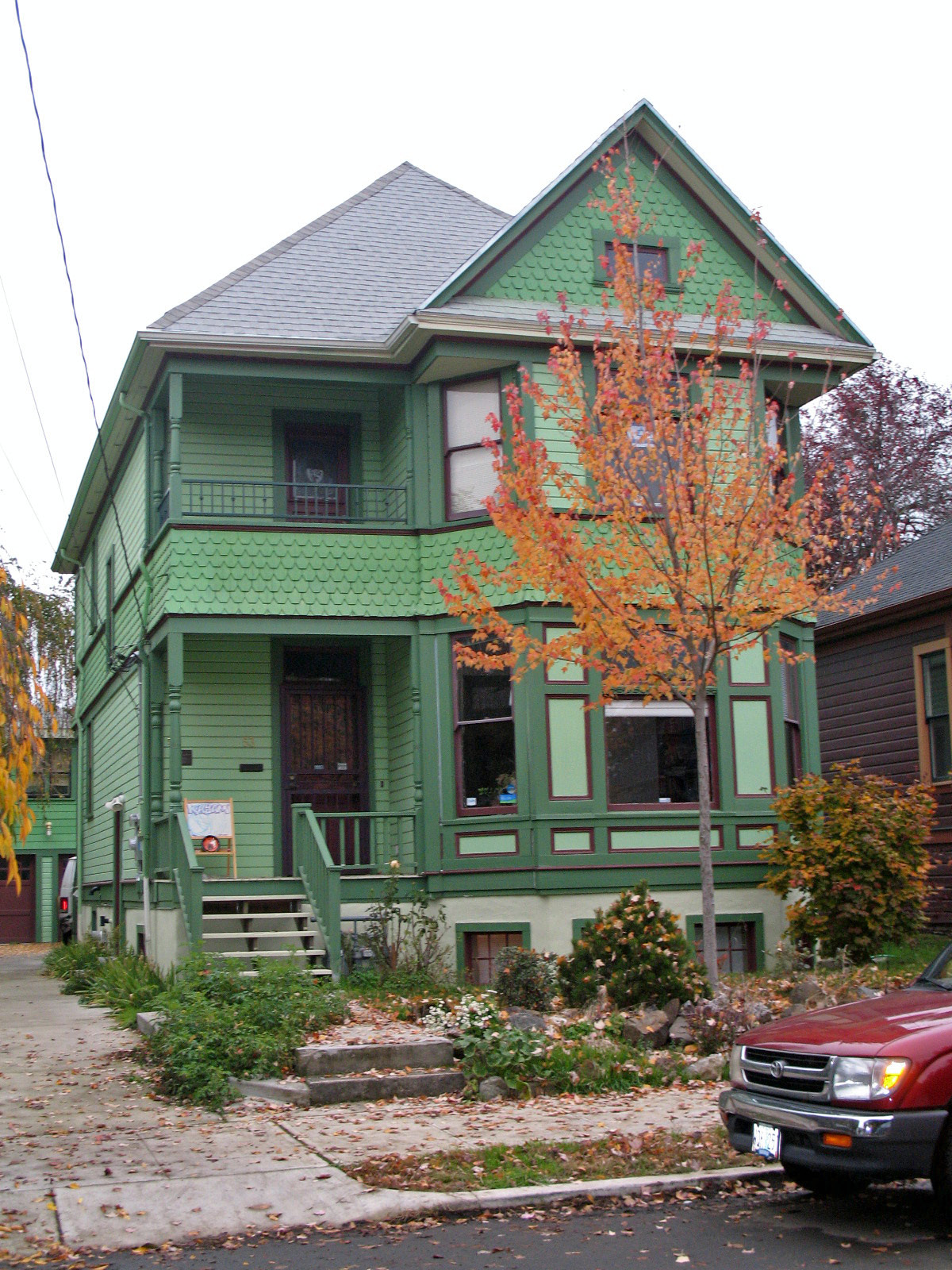
- The house in 2009

- Location within the United States Location within Oregon Location within Portland, Oregon
- Location: 53 NE Thompson Street; Portland, Oregon
- Coordinates: 45°32′21″N 122°39′55″W
- Area: 0.17 acres (0.069 ha)
- Built: 1899
- Built by: Henry C. Keck
- Architectural style: Queen Anne
- MPS: Eliot Neighborhood MPS
- NRHP reference No.: 02001124
- Added to NRHP: October 10, 2002

The H. C. Keck House, also known as the Mount Olivet Parsonage, is a historic building located in the Eliot neighborhood of Portland, Oregon, United States. Built in 1899 by German American carpenter Henry C. Keck, it illustrates the settlement of Albina by ethnic Europeans and is a good example of the use of the Queen Anne style in that period. As the presence of African Americans in Albina increased, the house was purchased by Mount Olivet Baptist Church in 1929 to be its parsonage. In that role, the house was home to locally prominent civil rights leaders Rev. Jonathan L. Caston (in residence 1929–1932) and Rev. J. James Clow (in residence 1936–1963).

The house was relocated in 1929 as part of its acquisition by the church, and again in 2001 to preserve it from demolition. It was inscribed on the National Register of Historic Places in 2002.

== See also ==
- National Register of Historic Places listings in Northeast Portland, Oregon
