= Denyc Boles =

American politician

Member of the Oregon State Senate from the 10th district
- In office June 28, 2019 – January 10, 2021
- Preceded by: Jackie Winters
- Succeeded by: Deb Patterson

Member of the Oregon House of Representatives from the 19th district
- In office January 24, 2018 – June 28, 2019
- Preceded by: Jodi Hack
- Succeeded by: Raquel Moore-Green
- In office July 1, 2014 – January 12, 2015
- Preceded by: Kevin Cameron
- Succeeded by: Jodi Hack

Personal details
- Party: Republican
- Spouse: Jeff Boles
- Children: 3
- Education: Seattle Pacific University (BA); Regent University (MPP)

Denyc Nicole Boles is an American politician from the state of Oregon. A Republican, she was a member of the Oregon House of Representatives from 2014 to 2015 and from 2018 to 2019. She served in the Oregon State Senate, representing the 10th district, from 2019 to 2021.

== Oregon House of Representatives ==
Boles worked as chief of staff for State Representative Kevin Cameron. Cameron resigned on June 2, 2014, to become a member of the Marion County Commission. The members of the Commission then selected Boles to succeed Cameron. She informed the Commission that she would not run for election to the seat in the 2014 elections. She was sworn in on July 1. In October 2017, she announced she was running in the Republican Party primary for Marion County Commissioner.

In January 2018, Boles was again appointed to the House to fill the remainder of Jodi Hack's term.

In May 2018, Boles won a competitive Republican primary. In November 2018, Boles beat Democrat Mike Ellison in the general election for the 19th district in the Oregon House of Representatives.

== Oregon Senate ==
On June 25, 2019, commissioners from Marion and Polk counties appointed Boles to replace former state Senator Jackie Winters as the representative for District 10 in the Oregon State Senate. Winters died of lung cancer on May 29, 2019, leaving the seat vacant. Boles was sworn into office on June 28, 2019. Boles was unopposed in the May 19, 2020, Republican primary to retain the seat. She narrowly lost the general election on November 3, 2020, to Democrat Deb Patterson.

== 2024 U.S. House campaign ==
In August 2023, Boles announced her candidacy for the Republican nomination in Oregon's 6th congressional district in the 2024 election. She cited safety, the economy, and education as her top priorities.

== Personal life ==
Boles grew up in Salem, attending Sprague High School before earning a bachelor's degree from Seattle Pacific University. Boles is married with three children.
