= Tom Andersen =

American politician

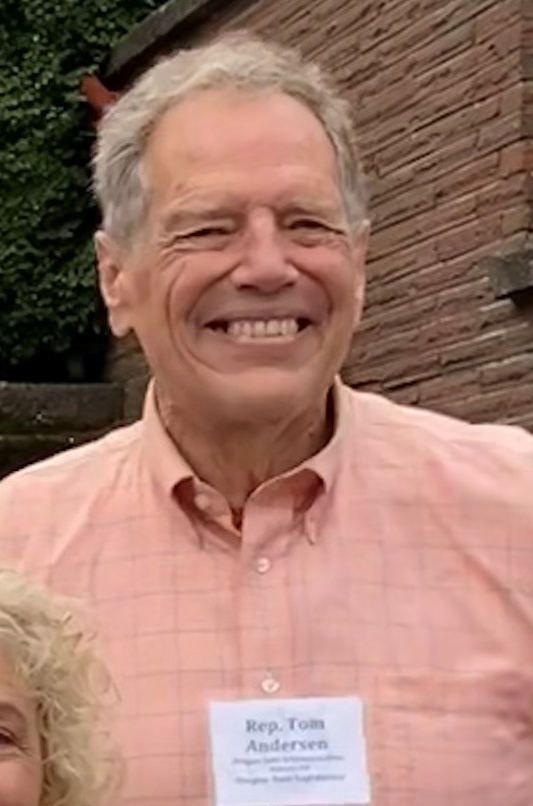

Member of the Oregon House of Representatives from the 19th district
- Incumbent
- Assumed office January 9, 2023
- Preceded by: Raquel Moore-Green

Personal details
- Party: Democratic
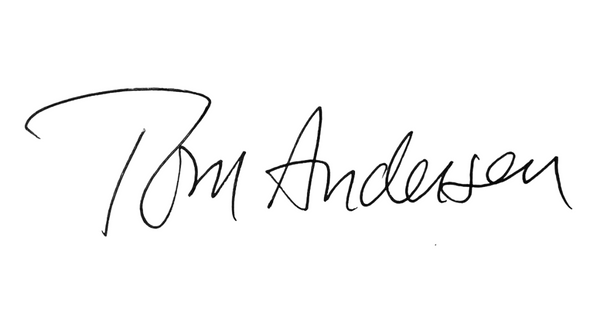
- Signature

Tom Andersen is an American Democratic politician from Oregon who is a member of the Oregon House of Representatives for the 19th district since 2023.

He previously served two terms on the Salem City Council.

== Electoral history ==
2022 Oregon State Representative, 19th district
| Party | Candidate | Votes | % |
|---|---|---|---|
| Democratic | Tom Andersen | 15,289 | 54.4 |
| Republican | TJ Sullivan | 12,779 | 45.5 |
| Write-in | | 40 | 0.1 |
| Total votes | | 28,108 | 100% |

2024 Oregon State Representative, 19th district
| Party | Candidate | Votes | % |
|---|---|---|---|
| Democratic | Tom Andersen | 17,296 | 54.3 |
| Republican | David Brown | 14,534 | 45.6 |
| Write-in | | 45 | 0.1 |
| Total votes | | 31,875 | 100% |
