= George Trahern =

American politician (1936–2026)

Member of the Oregon House of Representatives from the 49th district
- In office 1981–1988
- Succeeded by: Bob Repine

Personal details
- Born: June 29, 1936 Grants Pass, Oregon, U.S.
- Died: May 4, 2026 (aged 89)
- Party: Republican
- Spouse: Darlene Trahern
- Children: Karen Bodeving, Eugene Trahern, Keith Trahern
- Profession: Real estate appraiser, car dealer

George Eugene Trahern (June 29, 1936 – May 4, 2026) was an American politician who was a member of the Oregon House of Representatives and Oregon State Senate.

Trahern was born in Grants Pass, Oregon, and was a real estate appraiser. He served in the House from 1981 until he was appointed to the state senate, serving briefly for one session in 1988. Trahern died on May 4, 2026, at the age of 89.
