= Paul Evans (Oregon politician) =

American politician

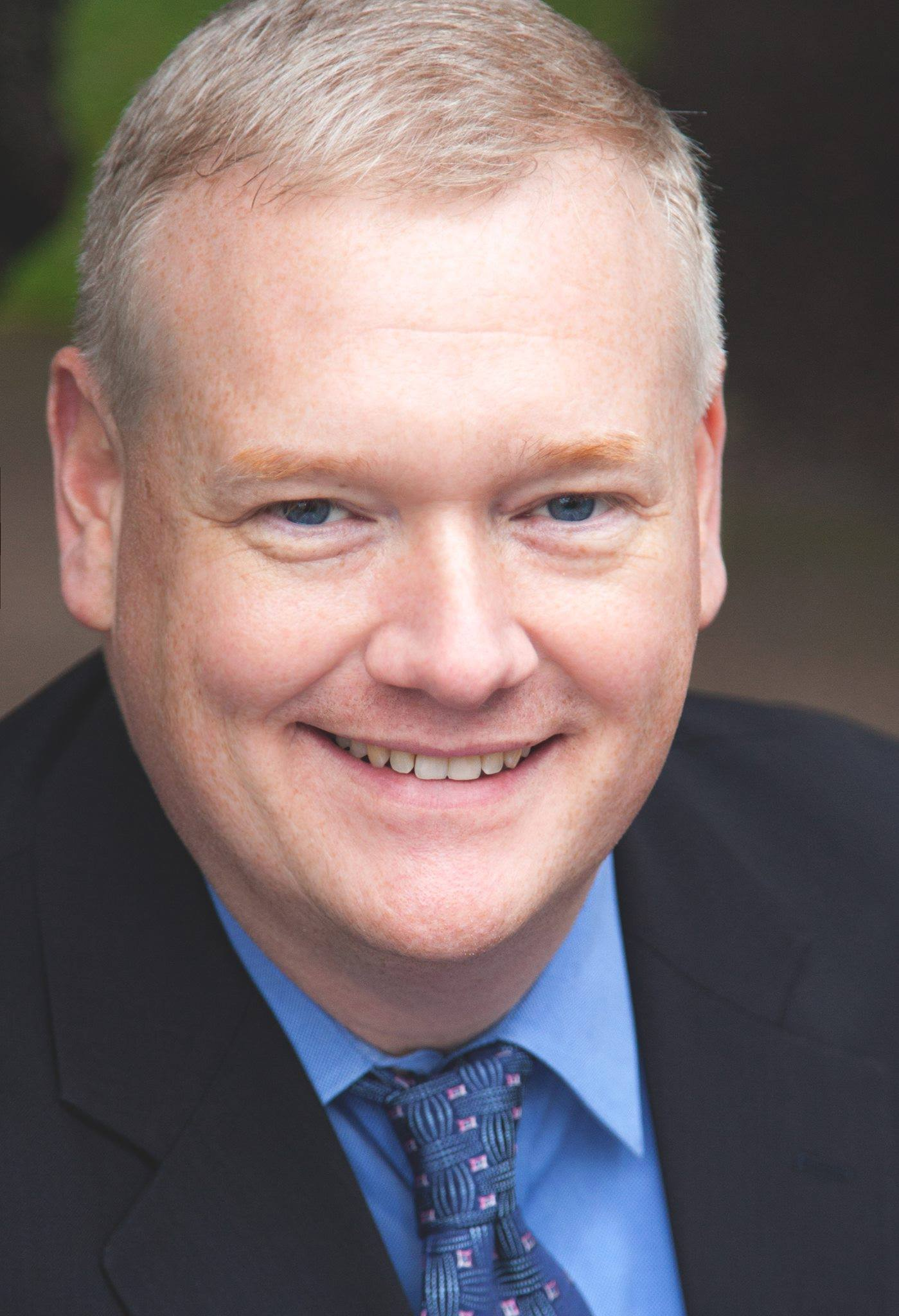

Member of the Oregon House of Representatives from the 20th district
- Incumbent
- Assumed office January 2015
- Preceded by: Vicki Berger

Mayor of Monmouth, Oregon
- In office January 1999 – December 2002

Member of the City Council of Monmouth, Oregon
- In office January 1989 – December 1992

Personal details
- Born: May 22, 1970 (age 56) Salem, Oregon, U.S.
- Party: Democratic
- Education: Air University; Oregon State University (MA); Air Force Officer Training School; Western Oregon University (BS)
- Profession: Politician
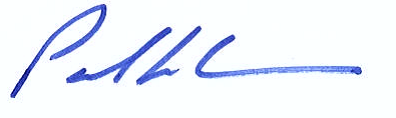
- Signature

Military service
- Allegiance: United States
- Branch/service: United States Air Force
- Years of service: 1993-2013

Paul Lynn Evans (born May 22, 1970) is an American politician. He has served in the Oregon House of Representatives since 2015, representing District 20, which includes parts of Marion and Polk counties. He was the mayor of Monmouth from 1999 to 2002.

== Biography ==
Evans earned his B.S. in Public Policy and Administration from Western Oregon University in 1992 and his M.A. in Interdisciplinary Studies (Environmental Policy, Rhetoric and Social Influence, and American Politics) from Oregon State University in 2001. His professional experience includes working as a volunteer fireman with the Polk County Fire District #1, a teacher at Western Oregon University, Chemeketa Community College and Oregon State University and President of Northwest Passage Trading Company. He served in the United States Air Force from 1993 to 1997, and in the Oregon Air National Guard from 1997 to 2013. Evans served in the military for 20 years before retiring in 2013. During that time, he participated in combat missions in Afghanistan and Iraq, including Operation Enduring Freedom in 2006 and Operation Iraqi Freedom in 2005.

In 2014, Evans defeated Republican candidate Kathy Goss, becoming the only Democrat to win a seat previously held by a Republican in the Oregon House of Representatives that year. In 2016, he retained his seat by defeating Republican challenger Laura Morett. In 2018 he defeated Republican challenger Selma Pierce to retain his seat for a third term.

== Political positions ==
In 2016, Evans introduced a bill which became Ballot Measure 96, which dedicated 1.5% of state lottery revenue to veterans services.

Evans supports overturning Measures 50 and 5, citing difficulty over local communities voting to raise their own taxes.

Evans supports banning firearm sales to youth, but broke with his party in April 2025 on waiting period legislation. The bills would require a 3 day waiting period to receive a gun after passing a background check. He criticized the bill as "an attack on liberty" and being harsh towards veterans. He has stated that the bills have led him to "seriously consider" changing his party affiliation.

== Electoral history ==
2006 Oregon State Senator, 10th district
Party	Candidate	Votes	%
Republican	Jackie Winters	24,641	53.6
Democratic	Paul Evans	21,232	46.2
Write-in		99	0.2
Total votes		45,972	100%

2014 Oregon State Representative, 20th district
Party	Candidate	Votes	%
Democratic	Paul Evans	12,400	51.2
Republican	Kathy B Goss	11,656	48.1
Write-in		165	0.7
Total votes		24,221	100%

2016 Oregon State Representative, 20th district
Party	Candidate	Votes	%
Democratic	Paul Evans	17,408	52.9
Republican	Laura S Morett	15,409	46.8
Write-in		77	0.2
Total votes		32,894	100%

2018 Oregon State Representative, 20th district
Party	Candidate	Votes	%
Democratic	Paul Evans	16,907	53.4
Republican	Selma Pierce	14,652	46.3
Write-in		84	0.3
Total votes		31,643	100%

2020 Oregon State Representative, 20th district
Party	Candidate	Votes	%
Democratic	Paul Evans	20,573	51.8
Republican	Selma Pierce	19,012	47.9
Write-in		102	0.3
Total votes		39,687	100%

2022 Oregon State Representative, 20th district
Party	Candidate	Votes	%
Democratic	Paul Evans	17,316	54.2
Republican	Dan Farrington	14,077	44.1
Libertarian	Taylor A Rickey	502	1.6
Write-in		32	0.1
Total votes		31,927	100%

2024 Oregon State Representative, 20th district
Party	Candidate	Votes	%
Democratic	Paul Evans	20,721	58.0
Republican	Kevin S Chambers	14,938	41.8
Write-in		73	0.2
Total votes		35,732	100%
