= Jodi Hack =

American politician

Member of the Oregon House of Representatives from the 19th district
- In office January 12, 2015 – December 31, 2017
- Preceded by: Denyc Boles
- Succeeded by: Denyc Boles

Personal details
- Party: Republican

Jodi Hack is an American politician from Oregon. She was elected to the Oregon House of Representatives in 2014 in District 19, which covers parts of Salem. She originally sought an interim appointment to the seat after the resignation of Kevin Cameron in 2014, but Cameron's chief of staff Denyc Boles was appointed after confirming she would not run for a full term. Hack defeated Bill Dalton, the Democratic Party nominee, on November 4, 2014.

Hack previously worked as a spokeswoman and grantwriter for the North Santiam School District.

Hack resigned December 31, 2017, to become CEO of the Oregon Home Builders Association.

== Electoral history ==
2014 Oregon State Representative, 19th district
Party	Candidate	Votes	%
Republican	Jodi L Hack	12,664	57.0
Democratic	Bill Dalton	9,522	42.8
Write-in		50	0.2
Total votes		22,236	100%

2016 Oregon State Representative, 19th district
Party	Candidate	Votes	%
Republican	Jodi Hack	17,805	60.9
Democratic	Larry Trott	11,337	38.8
Write-in		110	0.4
Total votes		29,252	100%
