= Lisa Naito =

Lisa Naito may refer to:

- Lisa Naito (Oregon politician)
- Lisa Naito (Hawaii politician)
