= Scott Duff =

American politician

Member of the Oregon State Senate from the 29th district
- In office 1991–1993
- Preceded by: Michael G. Thorne
- Succeeded by: Gordon H. Smith

Personal details
- Born: November 12, 1950
- Died: June 21, 2020 (aged 69)
- Party: Democratic
- Education: Oregon State University; Waseda University

Scott Duff (November 12, 1950 – June 21, 2020) was an American politician. He served as a Democratic member for the 29th district of the Oregon State Senate.

== Life and career ==
Duff attended Oregon State University and Waseda University.

Duff was a wheat grower.

In 1991, Duff was appointed to represent the 29th district of the Oregon State Senate.

Duff died on June 21, 2020 from complications of cancer, at the age of 69.
