= Todd Nash =

American politician

Member of the Oregon State Senate from the 29th district
- Incumbent
- Assumed office January 13, 2025
- Preceded by: Bill Hansell

Wallowa County Commissioner
- In office 2017–2025
- Succeeded by: Lisa Collier

President of the Oregon Cattlemen's Association
- In office 2021–2023
- Preceded by: Tom Sharp
- Succeeded by: Matt McElligott

Personal details
- Party: Republican
- Education: Linn–Benton Community College; Enterprise High School

Todd Nash is an American rancher and politician currently serving in the Oregon State Senate. A member of the Republican Party, he represents the 29th district, which covers most of northeastern Oregon.

== Early life and education ==
Nash was born in Sacramento, California and moved to Oregon at a young age. He graduated from Enterprise High School and attended Linn–Benton Community College.

== Career ==
Nash is a cattle rancher in Wallowa County.

In 2016, he was elected to the Wallowa County Commission, and served in that position for two terms.

From 2021 to 2023, he was president of the Oregon Cattlemen's Association, a ranching trade association and advocacy group.

As OCA president, Nash advocated for changes to the state's management of gray wolves. He took part in a stakeholder work group on updating the state's Wolf Conservation and Management Plan.

=== Oregon State Senate ===
On March 30, 2023, Nash announced his candidacy for Oregon State Senate in district 29 to replace Bill Hansell, who announced his retirement. In the Republican primary, Nash faced a former Morrow County Commissioner, the Mayor of Hermiston, Oregon, and the executive secretary of the Young Republicans of Oregon. Nash defeated all three, earning over 50% of the vote. He was endorsed in the primary by the political action committee of the anti-abotion group Oregon Right to Life. Nash defeated unaffiliated candidate Tania Wildbill in the general election, earning over 80% of the vote.

In the 2025 session, Nash was the chief sponsor of Senate Bill 777, which changed how Oregon compensates livestock producers for losses to wolves. The bill set payments at up to five times fair market value for some animals, capped at $25,000 per animal, and eliminated compensation for missing livestock.

In the 2026 session, Nash supported Senate Bull 1578, which would have allowed counties with fewer than 30 people per square mile to rezone up to 50 acres outside urban growth boundaries for housing. The bill did not advance out of committee.

In the 2026 session, Nash was vice chair of the Senate Committee on Natural Resources and Wildfire, a member of the Senate Committee on Housing and Development, and a member of the Joint Ways and Means Subcommittee on Natural Resources.

Nash represents the 29th district, which encompasses all of Gilliam, Morrow, Sherman, Umatilla, Union, Wallowa, and Wheeler counties, the Warm Springs Reservation, as well as parts of Clackamas, Jefferson, Marion, and Wasco counties.

== Personal life ==
Nash married and has four children. He currently resides in Enterprise with his family.

== Electoral history ==
2024 Oregon State Senator, 29th district
Party	Candidate	Votes	%
Republican	Todd Nash	45,473	81.5
Independent	Tania Wildbill	10,099	18.1
Write-in		253	0.5
Total votes		55,825	100%

2024 Oregon State Senator, 29th district primary
Party	Candidate	Votes	%
Republican	Jim Doherty	4,215	25
Republican	Dave Drotzmann	3,400	20.1
Republican	Andy Huwe	291	1.7
Republican	Todd Nash	8,916	52.8
Write-in		55	0.3
Total votes		16,877	100.00
