= Mike Burton (politician) =

American politician (born 1941)

Michael Leigh Burton (born August 4, 1941, in Alhambra, California) is an American politician. He served in the Oregon House of Representatives from 1985 to 1995 and was Speaker Pro-tempore (temporarily) in the 1991 session.

He was the Executive Officer of Metro, a regional government in the Portland, Oregon metropolitan area, from 1995 to 2003. He was a member of the original Metro Council (elected in 1978) and served until 1982. He was also vice provost and executive director of Portland State University's school of Extended Studies from 2003 to 2011. Following an audit over his travel expenses by PSU, he resigned from the university in June 2011 after being threatened to be put on an administrative leave. He was convicted of official misconduct in 2012 for falsely claiming his pleasure trip to Europe in 2010 as a work related expense. As of 2019, Burton lives in Vancouver, Washington.

== 1995 election ==
Burton was elected to his first term as Executive Officer in 1995. He ran on a platform of maintaining a tight urban growth boundary and expansion of regional parks and facilities.

Metro is responsible for managing the Portland metropolitan region's urban growth boundary and is required by state law to have a 20-year supply of land for future residential development inside the boundary. Every five years, the Metro Council is required to conduct a review of the land supply and, if necessary, expand the boundary to meet that requirement. In its 2002 review, the Metro Council also asked technical staff to determine how much land would be required to meet a 20-year land supply for new jobs.

One of Burton's first acts was the implementation of an Open Spaces and Trails ballot measure approved by the voters. This $135.6 million bond measure called for the purchase of 6,000 acres of land within the Metro area to be preserved.

The region purchased more than 8,000 acres of natural areas, and nearly 74 miles of stream and river frontage have been protected. More than 100 local park projects in neighborhoods across the region offer biking, hiking and wildlife watching opportunities close to home.

== Urban growth issue ==
Burton had to tackle the question of expansion of the urban growth boundary. Under Oregon law, each city or metropolitan area in the state has an urban growth boundary that separates urban land from rural land. Metro is responsible for managing the Portland metropolitan region's urban growth boundary.

The urban growth boundary was not intended to be static. Since the late 1970s, the boundary has been moved about three dozen times. Most of those moves were small – 20 acres or less.

During Burton's tenure there were three significant boundary expansions. In 1998, about 3,500 acres were added to make room for approximately 23,000 housing units and 14,000 jobs. Acreage included areas around the Dammasch state hospital site near Wilsonville, the Pleasant Valley area in east Multnomah, the Sunnyside Road area in Clackamas County, and a parcel of land south of Tualatin.

In 1999, another 380 acres were added based on the concept of "subregional need." An example of "subregional need" would occur when a community needed land to balance the number of homes with the number of jobs available in that area.

In 2002, an unprecedented 18,867 acres were added to the urban growth boundary to provide 38,657 housing units and 2,671 acres for additional jobs. These expansions represented an increase of only about nine percent, even though the area's population has increased by about 17 percent since 1990.

== Re-election ==
Burton was unopposed in his bid for re-election in 1999 but had some difference with his elected council members. The Executive Officer was a position elected at large and the Councilors were elected by districts. The Executive was the head of government and the administrator of all the functions, managing the $450-million budget and its 1,200 employees. The Council adopted a budget and passed policies. The Executive had limited veto power over council activities but did not sit in on council meetings. The result was poor communications and council members feeling they were little more than spectators.

Burton recommended a change in the Charter of Metro to go to the voters in 2000. This charter change eliminated the position of Executive Officer and replaced it with a President of the council and also called for the appointment of a Chief Operations Officer who would run the day-to-day operations. This was, in effect, equivalent to a city manager-council type of government. Burton said at the time that: "It is better to elect leaders and appoint managers".

One council member, Jon Kvistad, said the charter change was a way for Burton to circumvent the term limit on the executive officer imposed by the charter. Burton amended his proposal to insure that he would not be eligible under the new rules to be Council President. The measure easily passed and went into effect at the end of Burton's last term in office.

Burton was succeeded as Metro president by David Bragdon, in January 2003.

== Portland State University School of Extended Studies ==
In 2003, Burton became the vice provost and executive director of Portland State University's School of Extended Studies. Burton resigned from PSU in June 2011 after the university threatened to place him on an administrative leave following an audit.

== Official misconduct ==
Burton claimed $4,500 in pleasure trip to Europe in 2010 as a work expense while employed by the Portland State University. He pled guilty to the charge of official misconduct in May 2012 and was sentenced to 1 1/2 years on bench probation.

PSU was reluctant to pursue a criminal case and Oregon Department of Justice and Multnomah County District Attorney's office expressed concerns about PSU's reluctance to do so.

Multnomah County Court quashed the case in 2013 after Burton appealed and made a settlement with the university.

== See also ==
- Land use in Oregon
