= Mt. Olivet Baptist Church (Portland, Oregon) =

Historic building in Portland, Oregon, U.S.

- U.S. National Register of Historic Places
- Location within Oregon Location within the United States
- Location: 1734 NE 1st Ave., Portland, Oregon, U.S.
- Coordinates: 45°32′8″N 122°39′52″W
- NRHP reference No.: 100007457
- Added to NRHP: February 23, 2022

Mt. Olivet Baptist Church in Portland, Oregon is listed on the National Register of Historic Places. It is at 1734 NE 1st Avenue and was added to the National Register of Historic Places on February 23, 2022.

== See also ==
- National Register of Historic Places listings in Northeast Portland, Oregon
- H. C. Keck House
