= Michael G. Thorne =

American politician (born 1940)

Member of the Oregon State Senate from the 29th district
- In office 1973–1991
- Succeeded by: Scott Duff

Personal details
- Born: Michael Glenn Thorne; September 25, 1940 (age 85) Pendleton, Oregon, U.S.
- Party: Democratic
- Profession: farmer, real estate broker

Michael Glenn Thorne (born September 25, 1940) is an American politician who was a member of the Oregon State Senate.

A native of Pendleton, Oregon, he is a wheat farmer and real estate broker. He was director of the Port of Portland from 1991 to 2001 and director and chief executive officer of the Washington State Ferry System from 2002 to 2004.
