= Jim Whitty =

American politician

Member of the Oregon House of Representatives from the 47th district
- In office 1985–1995

Personal details
- Born: September 11, 1931 North Bend, Oregon
- Died: November 18, 2015 (aged 84) Coquille, Oregon
- Party: Democratic

James Francis Whitty (September 11, 1931 - November 18, 2015), was an American politician who was a member of the Oregon House of Representatives.

He was born in North Bend, Oregon. He attended the University of Portland, where he earned a Bachelor of Arts degree.

His wife, Nikki Whitty, née Hungerford, (1945–2011) was county commissioner of Coos County, Oregon.
