= Oregon's 29th Senate district =

American legislative district

Oregon's 29th Senate District as of September 27, 2021

District 29 of the Oregon State Senate comprises all of Gilliam, Morrow, Sherman, Umatilla, Union, Wallowa, and Wheeler counties as well as parts of Clackamas, Jefferson, Marion, and Wasco counties. The district is composed of Oregon House districts 57 and 58. It is currently represented by Republican Todd Nash of Enterprise.

== Election results ==
District boundaries have changed over time. Therefore, senators before 2021 may not represent the same constituency as today. From 1993 until 2003, it covered parts of northeastern Oregon; from 2003 until 2013, it covered Morrow, Umatilla, Union, and Wallowa counties in northeastern Oregon; and from 2013 until 2023, it expanded to cover Gilliam and Sherman counties as well as parts of eastern Wasco County.

The current district is very similar to its previous iterations, adding south Wasco County as well as the Warm Springs Indian Reservation and Mt. Jefferson, which added lands in Clackamas, Marion, and Jefferson counties.

The results are as follows:

Year	Candidate	Party	Percent	Opponent	Party	Percent
1984	Michael G. Thorne	Democratic	72.5%	James D. Frisbie	Republican	27.5%
1988	Michael G. Thorne	Democratic	100.0%	Unopposed		
1992	Gordon H. Smith	Republican	58.3%	Scott Duff	Democratic	41.7%
1996	David Nelson	Republican	100.0%	Unopposed		
2000	David Nelson	Republican	71.9%	Bill George Duncan	Democratic	28.1%
2004	David Nelson	Republican	98.1%	Unopposed		
2008	David Nelson	Republican	98.1%	Unopposed		
2012	Bill Hansell	Republican	68.4%	Antone Minthorn	Democratic	31.3%
2016	Bill Hansell	Republican	80.3%	Barbara Dickerson	Independent	19.4%
2020	Bill Hansell	Republican	75.9%	Mildred O'Callaghan	Democratic	23.9%
2024	Todd Nash	Republican	81.5%	Tania Wildbill	Nonaffiliated	18.1%
