= Avel Gordly =

American politician (1947–2026)

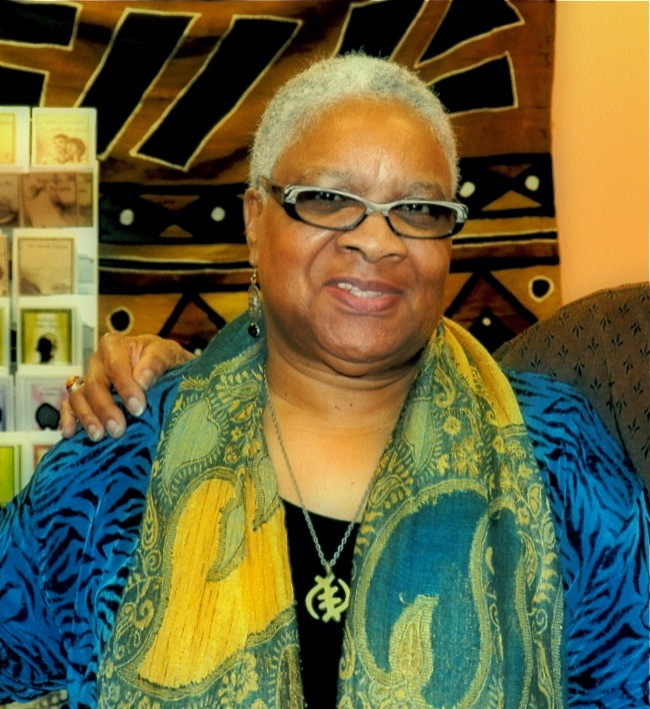
- Avel Gordly in 2011

Member of the Oregon Senate from the 23rd district
- In office 1997–2009
- Preceded by: Ron Cease
- Succeeded by: Jackie Dingfelder

Member of the Oregon House of Representatives from the 19th district
- In office 1991–1996
- Preceded by: Ron Cease
- Succeeded by: Jo Ann Bowman

Personal details
- Born: February 13, 1947 Portland, Oregon, U.S.
- Died: February 16, 2026 (aged 79) Portland, Oregon, U.S.
- Party: Independent (since 2006)
- Other political affiliations: Democratic (until 2006)
- Education: Portland State University
- Occupation: Activist, community organizer, educator

Avel Louise Gordly (February 13, 1947 – February 16, 2026) was an American activist, community organizer, and politician in the U.S. state of Oregon. In 1996, she became the first African-American woman to be elected to the Oregon State Senate, serving from 1997 to 2009.

== Early years ==
Avel Louise Gordly was born on February 13, 1947, in Portland, Oregon, to Fay Lee Gordly, a railroad worker and auxiliary police officer, and Beatrice Bernice Coleman Gordly, a homemaker, part-time clerk at local Black-owned grocery store Neighborhood Bill's, and a Grand Worthy Matron in the Order of the Eastern Star. She was raised in a working-class, predominantly African-American neighborhood in Northeast Portland, along with her older brother, Tyrone Lee Gordly, and younger sister, Fayetta Gordly Burch. Her maternal grandmother, Alberta Louise Randolph, was a prominent community leader and founding member of the Oregon Association of Colored Women's Clubs and the Harriet Tubman Club in Portland. Her paternal grandmother, Lessie Gordly, worked as a domestic laborer and in the shipyards during World War II. Both women were formative influences in Gordly's early life.

Gordly attended Girls Polytechnic High School, where she was one of only 20 Black students. She resisted efforts to steer her toward vocational education, instead advocating for access to academic and business courses. On September 22, 1963, at the age of sixteen, Gordly participated in a civil rights march in Portland organized in response to the bombing of the 16th Street Baptist Church in Birmingham, Alabama. Encouraged by one of her teachers to attend, Gordly later described the event as formative in her awareness of political and social justice issues.

After graduating from high school, Gordly worked for Pacific Northwest Bell for five years before enrolling at Portland State University, where she majored in the Administration of Justice. At Portland State, she was introduced to African American literature through her classes in the then-newly established Black Studies department and became involved in international outreach through her participation in Operation Crossroads Africa. In 1970, she traveled to Nigeria as part of the program, an experience she later described as transformative. She earned a Bachelor of Science degree in 1974, becoming the first person in her immediate family to graduate from college. After graduating, Gordly began working with the Oregon Department of Corrections as a counselor in a women's work release facility.

Gordly was raised in the Mt. Olivet Baptist Church community, where she was active in youth groups and local programming. Through the church community, Gordly participated in public speaking events and community service from a young age. She credited the church with the development of her values of leadership, service, and public responsibility. Faith remained an important part of her adult life, and she remained closely involved with Portland's Black church community throughout her political career.

== Political office ==
Gordly was appointed to the Oregon House of Representatives in 1991, replacing Representative Ron Cease. She was later elected to the seat, ultimately serving three terms, representing parts of north and northeast Portland. In 1996, she was elected to the Oregon State Senate, becoming the first African-American woman to serve in that chamber, from 1997 to 2009. Originally a Democrat, Gordly changed her party affiliation to non-affiliated in 2006 and did not seek re-election in 2008.

During her legislative career, Gordly championed social justice, civil rights, education reform, and mental health reform. During her legislative career Gordly led trade missions to South Africa and Zambia and participated in another to South Korea. As senator, she served as co-chair of Oregon Governor John Kitzhaber's Task Force on Racial and Ethnic Health. In 2001, Gordly sponsored Senate Joint Resolution 31, which officially recognized Juneteenth in Oregon. In 2002, Gordly was the chief petitioner for Oregon Ballot Measure 14, a legislatively referred constitutional amendment that removed racially discriminatory language from the Oregon Constitution, and for Measure 25, which raised Oregon's minimum wage and created a requirement for annual increases based on the Consumer Price Index.

In 2005, Gordly sponsored Senate Bill 300, also known as the Expanded Options Bill, which provides Oregon high school students with opportunities to further their educational experience by taking college-level courses at local postsecondary institutions.

In 2007, Gordly sponsored SB 420, which established Oregon's Environmental Justice Task Force (renamed the Environmental Justice Council in 2022), a diverse, statewide, 13-member council which advises the Governor on environmental justice issues.

In 2008, while Gordly was serving as senator, Oregon Health & Science University opened the Avel Gordly Center for Healing, which provides culturally sensitive mental health and psychiatric services to underserved populations, particularly members of the Black community. At the time of her death in 2026, her childhood home on North Williams Avenue housed the Gordly Burch Center for Black Leadership and Civic Engagement, an organization preserving the history of Oregon's Black leaders and promoting new Black leaders and policy makers in the area.

In 2010, Gordly was the public face of the second attempt to recall then-Portland Mayor Sam Adams.

== Later work ==
After retiring from the legislature, Gordly joined the faculty of Portland State University as an associate professor in the Black Studies Department. In collaboration with historian Patricia A. Schechter, she co-authored her memoir, Remembering the Power of Words (2001, ISBN 0-87071-604-2), published by Oregon State University Press in 2011.

In honor of her legacy, Dr. Schechter and Dr. Carmen Thompson established the Avel Louise Gordly Scholarship for Oregon Black Women, which supports Black female graduates of Oregon high schools attending an Oregon or a historically Black college or university.

In 2017, Gordly was awarded an honorary doctorate in Humane Letters by Portland State University.

The City of Portland declared March 30, 2022, Avel Louise Gordly Day in recognition of her lifetime of public service.

== Personal life and death ==
Gordly had one son, Tyrone Wayne Waters (born 1966), who is a Navy veteran and mental health advocate. Gordly spoke publicly about the challenges of balancing motherhood, mental health, and public life.

Gordly died in Portland on February 16, 2026, at the age of 79.

== See also ==
- List of American politicians who switched parties in office
