= Bob Repine =

American politician

Member of the Oregon House of Representatives for the 49th district
- In office May 1988 – January 7, 1998
- Preceded by: George Trahern
- Succeeded by: Carl Wilson

Personal details
- Party: Republican

Bob Repine is an American politician from Oregon. He was a member of the Oregon House of Representatives for four terms, being appointed in May 1988 to his first term and resigning in January 1998 to accept nomination to head the Oregon Housing Agency, where he served until 2006. He also worked in other executive offices from 2006 to 2017, such as acting director of the Oregon Department of Energy, and director of the Economic and Community Development Department under Governor Kulongoski until his retirement in 2017. After his retirement, he worked to restore the Oregon Liberty Bell in 2020.
