= Jackie Winters =

American politician (1937–2019)

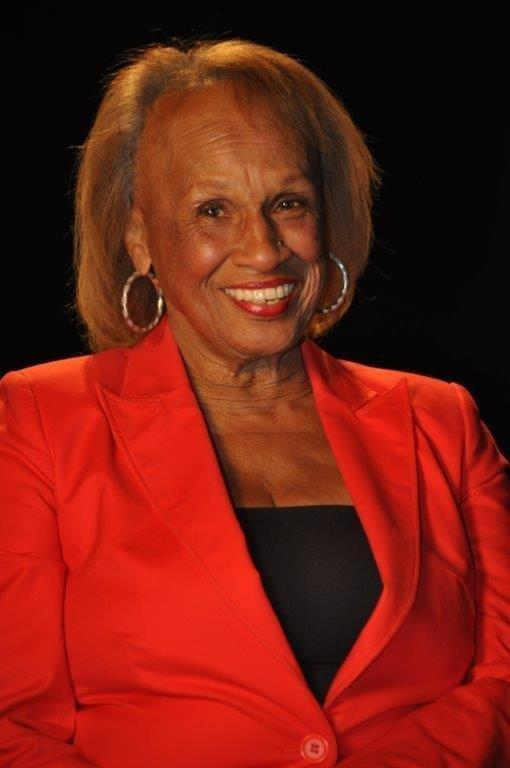

Minority Leader of the Oregon State Senate
- In office November 15, 2017 – January 22, 2019
- Preceded by: Ted Ferrioli
- Succeeded by: Herman Baertschiger Jr.

Member of the Oregon State Senate from the 10th district
- In office January 13, 2003 – May 29, 2019
- Preceded by: Avel Gordly
- Succeeded by: Denyc Boles

Member of the Oregon House of Representatives from the 31st district
- In office January 13, 1999 – January 13, 2003
- Preceded by: Bryan Johnston
- Succeeded by: Betsy Johnson

Personal details
- Born: April 15, 1937 Topeka, Kansas, U.S.
- Died: May 29, 2019 (aged 82) Salem, Oregon, U.S.
- Party: Republican
- Education: Portland Community College; Oregon State University

Jackie Winters (April 15, 1937 – May 29, 2019) was an American Republican politician in the U.S. state of Oregon. She served as a state senator, representing the 10th district in Salem. She was Senate Minority Leader. She died of lung cancer on May 29, 2019.

== Early life ==
Jackie Winters began her lifelong interest in citizen involvement in public policy as she listened to her parents’ discussions around the table, first in Topeka, Kansas where she was born, and later in Portland, Oregon where her family moved in 1943. She attended Portland Public Schools and continued her education through the Oregon State University System’s Continuing Education coursework, with an emphasis on Intergovernmental Relations.

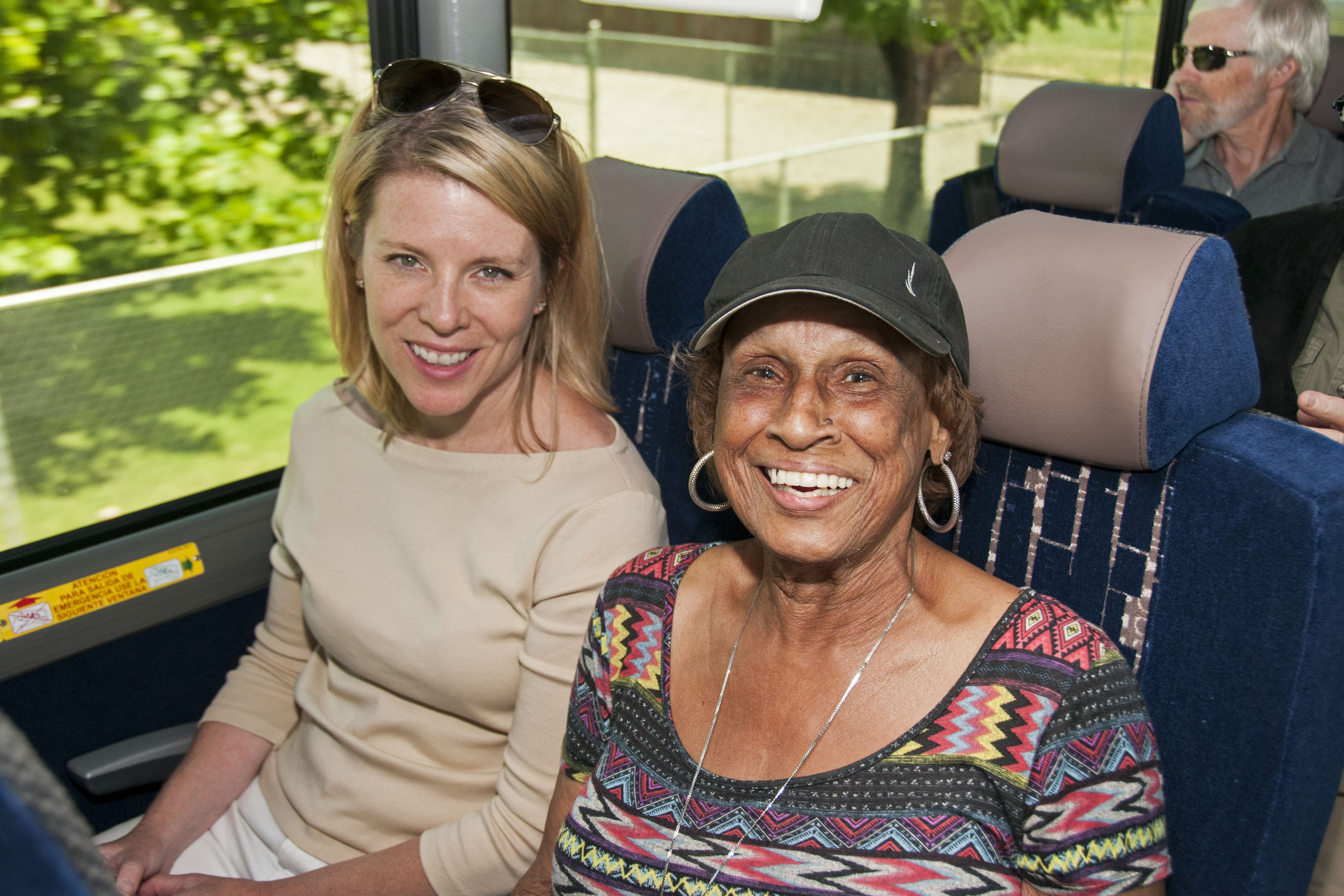
Winters (right) in 2016

She began her governmental service in 1959 at University of Oregon Medical School in the medical records unit and later joined the staff of the Portland Model Cities Program. In 1969 she was recruited to be supervisor of the Office of Economic Opportunity’s New Resources Program at the request of Governor Tom McCall. In 1979 she was appointed Ombudsman by Governor Victor Atiyeh. During this service, she helped create the Oregon Food Share Program, the first statewide non-profit food sharing network, which continues today serving most of Oregon’s neediest families.

In 1985, Winters opened her first Jackie’s Ribs restaurant, in Salem. Over time, she and her family expanded operations to include three restaurants, two franchises, catering services, private parties and numerous appearances in national Bar-B-Q Cook-offs.

== Political career ==
Winters was elected to the Oregon House of Representatives in 1998, and became the first African-American Republican ever to serve in the Oregon Legislative Assembly. She was re-elected to this office in 2000. Jackie Winters was elected to the Oregon State Senate in 2002. She won reelection in 2006, 2010, 2014 and again in 2018.

She ran for the U.S. Congress in 2004, losing in the Republican primary to Jim Zupancic, who went on to lose in the general election to incumbent Darlene Hooley.

On November 15, 2017, Winters was elected as Senate Minority Leader to replace Ted Ferrioli. She became the first black legislative leader in the state.

== Legal dispute ==
In 2018, Winters and the Home Owners Association she serves on was sued for violating the Fair Housing Act and Oregon's own fair housing laws. The HOA board Winters serves on allegedly contacted the Salem-Keizer School District and ordered the bus for a disabled girl to pick her up from a road outside the HOA subdivision instead of her home. When challenged by the girl's mother, the HOA banned buses from entering HOA subdivision entirely. Another family in the subdivision with a disabled child reportedly also had their child's bus service banned from the subdivision.

== Electoral history ==
2006 Oregon State Senator, 10th district
Party	Candidate	Votes	%
Republican	Jackie Winters	24,641	53.6
Democratic	Paul Evans	21,232	46.2
Write-in		99	0.2
Total votes		45,972	100%

2010 Oregon State Senator, 10th district
Party	Candidate	Votes	%
Republican	Jackie Winters	32,956	68.3
Democratic	Jackie Pierce	15,088	31.3
Write-in		191	0.4
Total votes		48,235	100%

2014 Oregon State Senator, 10th district
Party	Candidate	Votes	%
Republican	Jackie Winters	38,129	86.6
Libertarian	Glen E Ewert	5,315	12.1
Write-in		597	1.4
Total votes		44,041	100%

2018 Oregon State Senator, 10th district
Party	Candidate	Votes	%
Republican	Jackie F Winters	33,145	53.9
Democratic	Deb Patterson	28,210	45.9
Write-in		135	0.2
Total votes		61,490	100%

Oregon Senate
Preceded by Ted Ferrioli	Minority Leader of the Oregon Senate; 2017–2019	Succeeded by Herman Baertschiger Jr.
