= Delna Jones =

American politician

Member of the Oregon House of Representatives from the 6th district
- In office January 10, 1983 – January 11, 1993
- Preceded by: Mary Alice Ford
- Succeeded by: Ken Strobeck

Personal details
- Born: September 4, 1940 (age 85) Phoenix, Arizona
- Party: Republican

Delna Jones (born September 4, 1940) is an American politician who served in the Oregon House of Representatives from the 6th district from 1983 to 1993.
