= Lisa Naito (Hawaii politician) =

American politician

Member of the Hawaii House of Representatives
- In office 1975–1978

Personal details
- Born: Brooklyn, New York, U.S.
- Died: September 2011 (aged 76)
- Party: Democratic

Lisa Naito (died September 2011) was an American politician. She served as a Democratic member of the Hawaii House of Representatives.

== Life and career ==
Naito was born in Brooklyn, New York.

Naito served in the Hawaii House of Representatives from 1975 to 1978.

Naito died in September 2011, at the age of 76.
