= Ray Baum =

American politician

Raymond Sims Baum (August 18, 1955 – February 9, 2018) was an American lawyer, lobbyist, and politician

Baum was born and raised in La Grande, Oregon. He studied at Brigham Young University and Willamette University College of Law. Baum was admitted to the Oregon bar in 1983 and practiced law in La Grande. Baum was elected to the Oregon House of Representatives in 1988. He was majority leader in the state house for the Republican Party starting in 1995 but did not seek reelection in 1996. In 2003 Ted Kulongoski appointed Baum a member of the Oregon Public Utility Commission. He served there until 2011, serving as chairman starting in 2010. Baum worked for the National Association of Broadcasters and served as vice-president of government affairs. In December 2016, Ray joined U.S. Representative Greg Walden's staff as Staff Director on the Energy and Commerce Committee. There, he worked with the FCC on telecommunications issues.

== Personal life ==
Baum's wife is Kristine Baum. In February 2018, Ray Baum died at Suburban Hospital in Bethesda, Maryland from prostate cancer. Representative Greg Walden arranged to have RAY BAUM’S Act named in his honor due to his significant work in telecommunications.
