= Bruce Hugo =

American politician

Member of the Oregon House of Representatives from the 1st district
- In office 1983–1993

Personal details
- Born: September 11, 1945 Portland, Oregon, U.S.
- Died: January 4, 2017 (aged 71) St. Helens, Oregon, U.S.
- Party: Democratic
- Spouse: Linda Hugo
- Profession: communications consultant

Bruce Chadwick Hugo (September 11, 1945 – January 4, 2017) was an American politician and member of the Oregon House of Representatives. He was a communications consultant. After voting to legalize video poker, he became addicted to it and spent hundreds of dollars of Columbia county money on gaming machines in a bar in Scappoose.

He died on January 4, 2017.
