= Oregon Federation of Colored Women's Clubs =

Oregon women achieved the vote in 1912 and throughout the state women in organizations organized around racial groups and ethnicities. Portland had a significant number of African American women’s clubs and organizations, including the Oregon Federation of Colored Women's Clubs.

== Club history ==
Black women organized voter registration drives, public lectures, and events featuring well-known activist leaders to educate communities on important political issues. These clubs played important roles both locally and nationally in improving interracial relations and promoting civic engagement and uplift within African American communities. There were three pillars of community building in early Black Portland: women’s social clubs, newspapers and civic organizations. The Oregon Association of Colored Women's Clubs was formed in 1912 as the Colored Women’s Council and was a conglomeration of several smaller civic and literary clubs. Their motto was "Lift As We Climb." Katherine Gray was the first president when the club became the Oregon Federation of Colored Women’s Clubs.

== Suffrage ==
Women in the Oregon Federation of Colored Women’s Clubs were also involved in the Suffrage movement. At a meeting of the Colored Women’s Council of Portland on May 12, 1912 members formed the Colored Women’s Equal Suffrage League. Their goal was “spreading equal suffrage ideas among those of the race.” Katherine Gray was the first president, Mrs. Lancaster was vice president, Edith Gray was treasurer, and Hattie Redmond was secretary. Redmond later served as president.

== National association and consolidation ==
The Oregon club was organized under a regional and national branches of the National Association of Colored Women’s Clubs (NACWC), which was based in Washington D.C. NACWC was originally called the National Association of Colored Women (1896–1914) and was formed at a convention in Washington, D.C., when the National Federation of Afro-American Women and the National League of Colored Women merged.

By 1988, the club was called the Oregon Association of Color Women's Clubs, and had six active components: Altruistic Club, Fleur de Lis Club, Katherine Gray Club, Literary Research Club, Multnomah Women's Club, and the Harriet Tubman Club. They focused on charitable and educational work, awarded a Katherine Gray Scholarship and Women of the Year and Family of the Year awards, and supported local federated girls' clubs.
