= Oregon's 19th House district =

Legislative districts in the state of Oregon

Oregon's 19th House district after redistricting after the 2020 Census

District 19 of the Oregon House of Representatives is one of 60 House legislative districts in the state of Oregon. As of 2021, the district is contained entirely within Marion County and covers southeastern Salem, including the Salem airport, McNary Field and Willamette University. The current representative for the district is Democrat Tom Andersen of Salem.

== Election results ==
District boundaries have changed over time. Therefore, representatives before 2021 may not represent the same constituency as today. General election results from 2000 to present are as follows:

Year	Candidate	Party	Percent	Opponent	Party	Percent	Write-in percentage
2000	Jo Ann Bowman	Democratic	81.21%	Ivars Bitans	Republican	18.79%	
2002 (Note: Dan Doyle was the incumbent in this election. He previously represented District 30, but was moved to this district due to redistricting following the 2000 United States census.)	Dan Doyle	Republican	64.30%	Fred Fleischman	Democratic	35.32%	0.38%
2004	Dan Doyle	Republican	55.90%	Brian Grisham	Democratic	44.10%	
2006 (Note: Kevin Cameron was the incumbent in this election. He was appointed to this seat on February 17, 2005 to replace Dan Doyle, who resigned from office.)	Kevin Cameron	Republican	56.60%	Brian Grisham	Democratic	43.15%	0.25%
2008	Kevin Cameron	Republican	55.50%	Hanten Day	Democratic	44.14%	0.36%
2010	Kevin Cameron	Republican	61.16%	Claudia Kyle	Democratic	38.58%	0.27%
2012	Kevin Cameron	Republican	58.41%	Claudia Kyle	Democratic	41.35%	0.24%
2014	Jodi Hack	Republican	56.95%	William Dalton	Democratic	42.82%	0.22%
2016	Jodi Hack	Republican	60.87%	Larry Trott	Democratic	38.76%	0.38%
2018 (Note: Denyc Boles was the incumbent in this election. She was appointed to this seat on January 24, 2018 to replace Jodi Hack, who resigned from office to become CEO of the Oregon Home Builders Association.)	Denyc Boles	Republican	53.25%	Mike Ellison	Democratic	46.56%	0.19%
2020	Raquel Moore-Green	Republican	54.20%	Jacqueline Leung	Democratic	45.60%	0.20%
2022	Tom Andersen	Democratic	54.39%	TJ Sullivan	Republican	45.46%	0.14%
2024	Tom Andersen	Democratic	54.3%	David Brown	Republican	45.6%	0.1%

== See also ==
- Oregon Legislative Assembly
- Oregon House of Representatives
