= Ron Cease =

American politician

Member of the Oregon House of Representatives from the 19th district
- In office 1985–1991
- Succeeded by: Avel Gordly

Member of the Oregon Senate from the 10th district
- In office 1991–1997
- Preceded by: Jane Cease
- Succeeded by: Avel Gordly

Personal details
- Born: March 3, 1931 (age 95) Britton, South Dakota
- Party: Democratic
- Spouse: Jane Cease
- Profession: Professor

Ronald Clayton Cease (born March 3, 1931), is an American politician who was a member of the Oregon House of Representatives and Oregon State Senate.

Cease was born in Britton, South Dakota in 1931 and attended the Vanport Extension Center (later Portland State University). He was a professor of Public Administration and Political Science at Portland State University from 1966 to 2000. From 2001 to 2008, he sat on the Oregon Department of Forestry's (ODF) Committee for Family Forestlands. His wife, Jane Cease, also was an Oregon state legislator, serving stints in the State House of Representatives and the State Senate.
