= Jane Cease =

American politician

Member of the Oregon House of Representatives from the 19th district
- In office 1979–1985

Member of the Oregon Senate from the 10th district
- In office 1985–1991
- Succeeded by: Ron Cease

Personal details
- Born: January 23, 1936 (age 90) Columbus, Mississippi
- Party: Democratic
- Spouse: Ron Cease
- Education: Tulane University

Jane Hardy Cease (born January 23, 1936), was an American politician who was a member of the Oregon House of Representatives and Oregon State Senate.

Cease was born in Columbus, Mississippi and attended Tulane University. She married Ron Cease in 1960; they moved to Oregon in 1966. She served in the Oregon House of Representatives from 1979 to 1985, when she resigned to serve in the Oregon State Senate. Her replacement to the seat was her husband, Ron. She served in the State Senate from 1985 to 1991, when she was succeeded once again by her husband, Ron.
