= Oregon's 20th House district =

Legislative districts in the state of Oregon

Oregon's 20th House district after redistricting after the 2020 Census

District 20 of the Oregon House of Representatives is one of 60 House legislative districts in the state of Oregon. As of 2021, the boundary for the district includes portions of Marion and Polk counties. The district contains west and south Salem, Independence, and Monmouth and includes Western Oregon University. The current representative for the district is Democrat Paul Evans of Monmouth.

== Election results ==
District boundaries have changed over time. Therefore, representatives before 2021 may not represent the same constituency as today. General election results from 2000 to present are as follows:

Year	Candidate	Party	Percent	Opponent	Party	Percent	Opponent	Party	Percent	Write-in percentage
2000	Karen Minnis	Republican	56.32%	Mike Weatherby	Democratic	43.68%	No third candidate			
2002	Vicki Berger	Republican	62.81%	Lloyd Kurnley	Democratic	36.93%	No third candidate			0.26%
2004	Vicki Berger	Republican	60.82%	Jeanne Deane	Democratic	39.18%	No third candidate			
2006	Vicki Berger	Republican	59.53%	Connie Garcia	Democratic	40.13%	No third candidate			0.35%
2008	Vicki Berger	Republican	54.48%	Richard Riggs	Democratic	45.22%	No third candidate			0.30%
2010	Vicki Berger	Republican	63.04%	Mike Powers	Democratic	36.69%	No third candidate			0.27%
2012	Vicki Berger	Republican	62.57%	Jackie Pierce	Democratic	37.05%	No third candidate			0.38%
2014	Paul Evans	Democratic	51.20%	Kathy Goss	Republican	48.12%	No third candidate			0.68%
2016	Paul Evans	Democratic	52.92%	Laura Morett	Republican	46.84%	No third candidate			0.23%
2018	Paul Evans	Democratic	53.43%	Selma Pierce	Republican	46.30%	No third candidate			0.27%
2020	Paul Evans	Democratic	51.84%	Selma Pierce	Republican	47.90%	No third candidate			0.26%
2022	Paul Evans	Democratic	54.24%	Dan Farrington	Republican	44.09%	Taylor Rickey	Libertarian	1.57%	0.10%
2024	Paul Evans	Democratic	58.0%	Kevin S Chambers	Republican	41.8%	No third candidate			0.2%

== See also ==
- Oregon Legislative Assembly
- Oregon House of Representatives
