= 2024 Oregon elections =

- November 5, 2024

A general election was held in the U.S. state of Oregon on November 5, 2024. Primary elections were held on May 21, 2024.

In the early hours of October 28 an incendiary device was placed in a ballot drop box in Portland damaging 3 ballots.

== Federal ==
=== United States House of Representatives ===
All six of Oregon's seats in the United States House of Representatives were up for re-election in 2024. These seats were represented by four Democrats and two Republicans prior to the election.

In Oregon's 5th district, Democratic state representative Janelle Bynum defeated incumbent Republican Lori Chavez-DeRemer, flipping the district. Democratic state representative Maxine Dexter was elected to Oregon's 3rd district, replacing retiring Democratic representative Earl Blumenauer. Incumbent representatives Suzanne Bonamici, Cliff Bentz, Val Hoyle, and Andrea Salinas all won reelection in their respective districts.

== State offices ==
=== Secretary of state ===
After winning the election for Secretary of State in 2020, Democrat and former state legislator Shemia Fagan resigned from office on May 8, 2023, after revelations that she took a consulting job at a cannabis company while her office was auditing Oregon's marijuana industry, which many considered to be a conflict of interest. Cheryl Myers took office as acting Secretary of State while Governor Tina Kotek sought for another person to serve Fagan's remaining term. On June 28, 2023, Kotek announced former Portland city auditor LaVonne Griffin-Valade to serve the remaining term.

In the May primary election, Oregon State Treasurer Tobias Read was nominated by the Democratic Party and State Senator Dennis Linthicum was nominated by the Republican Party. The Progressive Party and Pacific Green Party both nominated Dr. Nathalie Paravicini.

In the general election, Read was elected with 54% of the vote.

=== Attorney general ===
Ellen Rosenblum, a Democrat and former judge on the Oregon Court of Appeals, was first elected in 2012, and was re-elected to the position in 2016 and 2020. Rosenblum has announced that she will not run for re-election.

In the May primary, Speaker of the House Dan Rayfield was nominated by the Democratic Party. The Republican Party nominated attorney Will Lathrop.

In the general election, Rayfield was elected with 54% of the vote.

=== State treasurer ===
Democrat and former state legislator Tobias Read was elected to a second term in 2020. Read is running for Secretary of State.

In the May primary, State Senators Elizabeth Steiner and Brian Boquist were nominated by the Democratic and Republican Parties, respectively.

In the general election, Steiner was elected with a plurality of 49% of the vote.

=== Legislature ===
All 60 seats in the Oregon House of Representatives and 15 of 30 seats in the Oregon State Senate were up for election in 2024.

In the general election, Democrats gained one seat in each chamber, enough for a three-fifths supermajority and the possibility of passing tax increases without Republican votes.

== Local elections ==
=== Portland ===
Incumbent Democratic mayor Ted Wheeler was eligible to run for re-election to a third term in office but decided not to run. Incumbent city auditor Simone Rede is eligible to run for re-election, and has stated her intention to do so. In addition, the Portland City Council was expanded from five seats to twelve (three each from one of four districts), all of which were elected for the first time.

The 2024 Portland elections were the first to use ranked-choice voting after it was instituted by the passage of a 2022 ballot measure. All elected city positions were up for election, but will return to staggered rotation in subsequent elections. All seats are nonpartisan.

== Ballot measures ==
There were five statewide Oregon ballot measures on the general election ballot. As a result of the election, two passed and three were rejected by voters.

=== Measure 115 ===
Ballot Measure 115
- Impeachment of Elected State Executives Amendment: Authorizes impeachment of statewide elected officials by Oregon Legislature with two-thirds vote by each House; establishes process.

Results
Choice	Votes	%
Yes	1,340,837	64.20%
No	747,543	35.80%

Oregon Ballot Measure 115, entitled the Impeachment of Elected State Executives Amendment, was a successful amendment to the Constitution of Oregon. As approved by voters, it amended the state Constitution to grant the Oregon State Legislature the power to impeach and remove statewide elected officials in the Executive branch of the Oregon state government: the Oregon Governor, Oregon Secretary of State, Oregon Attorney General, Oregon State Treasurer, and Oregon Commissioner of Labor and Industries.

Under the amendment, grounds for impeachment are "malfeasance or corrupt conduct in office, willful neglect of statutory or constitutional duty or other felony or high crime." The measure requires a two-thirds supermajority vote of the Oregon House of Representatives to impeach a statewide elected official. If successfully impeached, the chief justice of the Oregon Supreme Court would preside over a trial in the Oregon State Senate. After the conclusion of the trial, a vote of the state senators would be held on conviction of the official and would require another two-thirds supermajority vote to convict.

==== Background of Measure 115 ====
On May 1, 2023, then Oregon secretary of state Shemia Fagan announced that she would resign following reporting from Willamette Week that she had been working as a private consultant for the owners of La Mota, a cannabis dispensary chain operating in Oregon, while the Audits Division, which reported to Fagan, worked on an audit of the Oregon Liquor and Cannabis Commission. Fagan's resignation followed calls from Republican leaders in both chambers of the Oregon State Legislature for her to resign and occurred after Governor Tina Kotek launched an ethics investigation into Fagan's actions. Over a month after Fagan's resignation, each house of the Oregon Legislature voted unanimously to send the proposed impeachment referral to voters for the 2024 general election.

As of 2024, Oregon was the only state without an impeachment doctrine enshrined in its state Constitution. The only mechanism Oregon had for removing elected officials from office was recall, a process that had never in Oregon's history been successful at removing a governor or other statewide elected official.

Proponents of the measure argued that it was needed to expedite the removal of a statewide official for malfeasance and to give state legislators a mechanism for doing so that can be utilized by legislators in all other states. Oregon Rep. Jami Cate, a Lebanon Republican, cited the past ethics violations of previous elected officials, including Fagan, as evidence that this was a tool needed by the state legislature. Opponents argued that the current recall system was already sufficient and that voters should retain the right to remove officials that they themselves elected.

=== Measure 116 ===
Ballot Measure 116
- Independent Public Service Compensation Commission Amendment: Establishes “Independent Public Service Compensation Commission” to determine salaries for specified officials; eliminates legislative authority to set such salaries.

Results
Choice	Votes	%
Yes	981,715	47.54%
No	1,083,451	52.46%

Oregon Ballot Measure 116, the Independent Public Service Compensation Commission Amendment, was a proposed amendment to the Oregon Constitution. If approved, it would have established an "Independent Public Service Compensation Commission", which would determine salaries for politicians and other government figures in the state. Newspaper editorials by The Oregonian and Willamette Week opposed the amendment, stating that the Commission would not be independent from the Oregon Legislature, which would later determine who would get appointed to the Commission and how it would operate.

=== Measure 117 ===
Ballot Measure 117
- Ranked-Choice Voting for Federal and State Elections Measure: Gives voters option to rank candidates in order of preference; candidates receiving majority of votes in final round wins.

Results
Choice	Votes	%
Yes	893,668	42.30%
No	1,219,013	57.70%

Oregon Ballot Measure 117, the Ranked-Choice Voting for Federal and State Elections Measure, was a proposed state initiative. If approved, primary and general elections for statewide and federal offices would have been done through ranked-choice (instant-runoff) voting, as opposed to the current plurality voting system, starting in 2028. It would also have made the office of the secretary of state provide voter education on how to use the system. Other states that had adopted similar measures are Maine and Alaska. Two Oregon counties had already adopted RCV for local elections, being Benton and Multnomah.

=== Measure 118 ===
Ballot Measure 118
- Corporate Tax Revenue Rebate for Residents Initiative: Increases highest corporate minimum taxes; distributes revenue to eligible individuals; state replaces reduced federal benefits.

Results
Choice	Votes	%
Yes	477,516	22.53%
No	1,641,682	77.47%

Oregon Ballot Measure 118, the Corporate Tax Revenue Rebate for Residents Initiative, was a proposed state initiative. If accepted, the measure would have increased the state corporate minimum tax to 3% on businesses with sales of more than $25 million, and then used those funds to give a tax rebate of $1,600 to all Oregonians regardless of their income level.

The measure received overwhelming opposition from Oregon politicians across the political spectrum (including Governor Tina Kotek and State Treasurer Tobias Read), public policy organizations, and businesses. Opponents of the measure believed that an increased sales tax would be passed on to consumers through price increases, and criticized the tax rebate for its lack of income or age test (i.e. that even Oregon billionaires would receive an annual check). The primary donors who supported the bill are Californian residents who wish to promote the idea of a universal basic income.

Measure 118 was considered the most controversial of the five, and it united a broad coalition of politicians and business executives opposing it. It was overwhelmingly rejected by a majority of voters in all of Oregon's 36 counties.

=== Measure 119 ===
Ballot Measure 119
- Unionization of Cannabis Workers Initiative: Cannabis retailers/producers must remain neutral regarding communications to their employees from labor organizations; penalties.

Results
Choice	Votes	%
Yes	1,166,425	56.74%
No	889,265	43.26%

Oregon Ballot Measure 119, the Unionization of Cannabis Workers Initiative, was a successful initiative. As approved by voters, it would have made it easier for workers in the Cannabis industry to unionize. According to the Oregon Department of Employment, there were 7,281 workers that this initiative would have affected.

On May 20, 2025, a federal judge at the United States District Court for the District of Oregon struck down Measure 119, declaring it unconstitutional. The judge assigned to the case cited the measure as a violation of the free speech of cannabis business owners, and that it was preempted by the NLRA. At the request of the union UFCW Local 555, the Oregon Legislature passed House Bill 4162 in 2026 to fully repeal Ballot Measure 119 following the court ruling.

=== Polling ===
A poll was conducted by Public Policy Polling (a firm affiliated with the Democratic Party), and sponsored by the Northwest Progressive Institute. It was administered on October 16–17, 2024, with a sample of 716 likely voters. These figures have a margin of error of ± 3.7%.

Measure	For	Against	Undecided
Measure 115	53%	24%	22%
Measure 116	49%	26%	25%
Measure 117	41%	40%	20%
Measure 118	29%	54%	17%
Measure 119	49%	29%	23%

=== Results ===
Measure	Description	Votes	
Measure	Description	Yes	No
Measure 115	Amends Constitution: Authorizes impeachment of statewide elected officials by Oregon Legislature with two-thirds vote by each House; establishes process	1,340,837 (64.20%)	747,543 (35.80%)
Measure 116	Amends Constitution: Establishes "Independent Public Service Compensation Commission" to determine salaries for specified officials; eliminates legislative authority to set such salaries	981,715 (47.54%)	1,083,451 (52.46%)
Measure 117	Gives voters option to rank candidates in order of preference; candidate receiving majority of votes in final round wins	893,668 (42.30%)	1,219,013 (57.70%)
Measure 118	Increases highest corporate minimum taxes; distributes revenue to eligible individuals; state replaces reduced federal benefits	477,516 (22.53%)	1,641,682 (77.47%)
Measure 119	Cannabis retailers/processors must remain neutral regarding communications to their employees from labor organizations; penalties	1,166,425 (56.74%)	889,265 (43.26%)

==== Results by county ====
Results of each ballot measure

Measure 115

Measure 116

Measure 117

Measure 118

Measure 119

Yes

80-90%
70-80%
60-70%
50-60%

No

80-90%
70-80%
60-70%
50-60%

County	Measure 115			Measure 116			Measure 117			Measure 118			Measure 119		
County	Yes	No	Total	Yes	No	Total	Yes	No	Total	Yes	No	Total	Yes	No	Total
Baker	4392 (47.86%)	4785 (52.14%)	9177	2864 (31.46%)	6240 (68.54%)	9104	2241 (24.21%)	7017 (75.79%)	9258	1296 (13.97%)	7979 (86.03%)	9275	3217 (35.78%)	5774 (64.22%)	8991
Benton	31814 (67.07%)	15623 (32.93%)	47437	27182 (58.14%)	19573 (41.86%)	46755	27239 (56.79%)	20725 (43.21%)	47964	12999 (27.14%)	34890 (72.86%)	47889	30589 (65.47%)	16135 (34.53%)	46724
Clackamas	143553 (63.81%)	81405 (36.19%)	224958	104845 (46.97%)	118372 (53.03%)	223217	88555 (38.67%)	140454 (61.33%)	229009	50305 (21.95%)	178859 (78.05%)	229164	122254 (55.27%)	98925 (44.73%)	221179
Clatsop	13389 (62.22%)	8130 (37.78%)	21519	10461 (48.77%)	10987 (51.23%)	21448	9000 (41.11%)	12895 (58.89%)	21895	5342 (24.34%)	16608 (75.66%)	21950	12136 (56.93%)	9180 (43.07%)	21316
Columbia	16932 (57.4%)	12566 (42.6%)	29498	11731 (40.33%)	17359 (59.67%)	29090	10130 (34.03%)	19639 (65.97%)	29769	6082 (20.41%)	23719 (79.59%)	29801	14409 (49.61%)	14638 (50.39%)	29047
Coos	18246 (54.57%)	15193 (45.43%)	33439	13004 (39.68%)	19766 (60.32%)	32770	10283 (30.63%)	23287 (69.37%)	33570	6494 (19.18%)	27363 (80.82%)	33857	15217 (46.55%)	17471 (53.45%)	32688
Crook	7667 (49.43%)	7845 (50.57%)	15512	5490 (35.81%)	9840 (64.19%)	15330	3712 (23.79%)	11891 (76.21%)	15603	2215 (14.15%)	13434 (85.85%)	15649	5577 (36.82%)	9569 (63.18%)	15146
Curry	7094 (53.85%)	6080 (46.15%)	13174	5694 (43.68%)	7341 (56.32%)	13035	4263 (32.3%)	8935 (67.7%)	13198	3024 (22.88%)	10194 (77.12%)	13218	6309 (48.77%)	6626 (51.23%)	12935
Deschutes	75997 (63.41%)	43861 (36.59%)	119858	57345 (48.85%)	60052 (51.15%)	117397	50258 (41.93%)	69606 (58.07%)	119864	26870 (22.47%)	92723 (77.53%)	119593	62226 (53.55%)	53974 (46.45%)	116200
Douglas	28193 (48.27%)	30211 (51.73%)	58404	20123 (34.95%)	37457 (65.05%)	57580	15173 (25.8%)	43628 (74.2%)	58801	8637 (14.51%)	50880 (85.49%)	59517	22871 (39.95%)	34376 (60.05%)	57247
Gilliam	459 (42.5%)	621 (57.5%)	1080	381 (35.44%)	694 (64.56%)	1075	260 (23.79%)	833 (76.21%)	1093	173 (15.71%)	928 (84.29%)	1101	373 (35.09%)	690 (64.91%)	1063
Grant	1695 (40.46%)	2494 (59.54%)	4189	1214 (29.31%)	2928 (70.69%)	4142	979 (23.25%)	3231 (76.75%)	4210	515 (12.15%)	3724 (87.85%)	4239	1369 (33.44%)	2725 (66.56%)	4094
Harney	1680 (41.66%)	2353 (58.34%)	4033	1270 (31.67%)	2740 (68.33%)	4010	864 (21.19%)	3214 (78.81%)	4078	471 (11.5%)	3625 (88.5%)	4096	1387 (35.11%)	2563 (64.89%)	3950
Hood River	8260 (69.72%)	3588 (30.28%)	11848	6668 (57.11%)	5007 (42.89%)	11675	6172 (51.96%)	5707 (48.04%)	11879	3079 (25.82%)	8848 (74.18%)	11927	7197 (62.04%)	4403 (37.96%)	11600
Jackson	60620 (54.13%)	51360 (45.87%)	111980	48747 (44.09%)	61821 (55.91%)	110568	43580 (38.68%)	69098 (61.32%)	112678	24118 (21.36%)	88797 (78.64%)	112915	56020 (50.87%)	54106 (49.13%)	110126
Jefferson	5861 (52.7%)	5261 (47.3%)	11122	4192 (37.98%)	6844 (62.02%)	11036	3237 (28.9%)	7965 (71.1%)	11202	1960 (17.45%)	9275 (82.55%)	11235	4615 (42.28%)	6300 (57.72%)	10915
Josephine	18853 (41.19%)	26917 (58.81%)	45770	13960 (30.48%)	31840 (69.52%)	45800	12720 (27.49%)	33545 (72.51%)	46265	8006 (17.11%)	38785 (82.89%)	46791	17220 (37.88%)	28239 (62.12%)	45459
Klamath	16846 (50.69%)	16386 (49.31%)	33232	11228 (34.29%)	21518 (65.71%)	32746	8919 (26.72%)	24460 (73.28%)	33379	4870 (14.4%)	28959 (85.6%)	33829	12720 (39.06%)	19848 (60.94%)	32568
Lake	1807 (45.3%)	2182 (54.7%)	3989	1205 (30.33%)	2768 (69.67%)	3973	854 (21.23%)	3168 (78.77%)	4022	480 (11.77%)	3599 (88.23%)	4079	1235 (31.9%)	2636 (68.1%)	3871
Lane	126114 (64.21%)	70280 (35.79%)	196394	104384 (54.11%)	88536 (45.89%)	192920	87502 (43.96%)	111562 (56.04%)	199064	44081 (21.98%)	156480 (78.02%)	200561	110031 (57.03%)	82908 (42.97%)	192939
Lincoln	17480 (62.74%)	10383 (37.26%)	27863	13886 (50.17%)	13794 (49.83%)	27680	12166 (43.2%)	15998 (56.8%)	28164	7566 (26.72%)	20745 (73.28%)	28311	15992 (57.98%)	11588 (42.02%)	27580
Linn	36845 (54.66%)	30563 (45.34%)	67408	25478 (38.24%)	41155 (61.76%)	66633	20842 (30.68%)	47098 (69.32%)	67940	13063 (19.12%)	55254 (80.88%)	68317	30260 (45.73%)	35905 (54.27%)	66165
Malheur	5777 (55.43%)	4646 (44.57%)	10423	3395 (32.97%)	6903 (67.03%)	10298	2494 (23.97%)	7909 (76.03%)	10403	1981 (19.05%)	8416 (80.95%)	10397	4168 (40.81%)	6044 (59.19%)	10212
Marion	89601 (60.56%)	58342 (39.44%)	147943	64133 (44.02%)	81561 (55.98%)	145694	52631 (35.38%)	96108 (64.62%)	148739	32412 (21.73%)	116767 (78.27%)	149179	75558 (52.08%)	69510 (47.92%)	145068
Morrow	2032 (45.45%)	2439 (54.55%)	4471	1501 (34.06%)	2906 (65.94%)	4407	1108 (24.88%)	3345 (75.12%)	4453	702 (15.61%)	3794 (84.39%)	4496	1773 (40.6%)	2594 (59.4%)	4367
Multnomah	303176 (80.28%)	74484 (19.72%)	377660	198771 (52.73%)	178186 (47.27%)	376957	220355 (56.95%)	166600 (43.05%)	386955	105773 (27.3%)	281666 (72.7%)	387439	280752 (74.44%)	96378 (25.56%)	377130
Polk	25735 (57.31%)	19167 (42.69%)	44902	19320 (43.66%)	24930 (56.34%)	44250	15992 (35.44%)	29138 (64.56%)	45130	9498 (20.98%)	35764 (79.02%)	45262	22346 (50.79%)	21654 (49.21%)	44000
Sherman	651 (58.97%)	453 (41.03%)	1104	274 (24.77%)	832 (75.23%)	1106	205 (18.34%)	913 (81.66%)	1118	122 (10.83%)	1004 (89.17%)	1126	307 (28.24%)	780 (71.76%)	1087
Tillamook	8902 (58.63%)	6282 (41.37%)	15184	6674 (44.15%)	8443 (55.85%)	15117	5369 (34.96%)	9990 (65.04%)	15359	3263 (21.07%)	12227 (78.93%)	15490	7480 (49.92%)	7504 (50.08%)	14984
Umatilla	17338 (59.37%)	11863 (40.63%)	29201	10405 (36.08%)	18433 (63.92%)	28838	8253 (28.23%)	20982 (71.77%)	29235	5096 (17.37%)	24242 (82.63%)	29338	11617 (40.53%)	17049 (59.47%)	28666
Union	6757 (48.9%)	7062 (51.1%)	13819	4868 (35.55%)	8827 (64.45%)	13695	3876 (27.84%)	10046 (72.16%)	13922	1920 (13.71%)	12086 (82.86%)	14006	5338 (39.61%)	7504 (60.39%)	13477
Wallowa	2317 (47.99%)	2511 (52.01%)	4828	1724 (36.08%)	3054 (63.92%)	4778	1402 (29.01%)	3430 (70.99%)	4832	832 (17.14%)	4021 (82.86%)	4853	1788 (37.91%)	2928 (62.09%)	4716
Wasco	7043 (56.33%)	5460 (43.67%)	12503	5273 (42.78%)	7053 (57.22%)	12326	4310 (34.22%)	8285 (65.78%)	12595	2524 (19.91%)	10154 (80.09%)	12678	6032 (49.14%)	6243 (50.86%)	12275
Washington	196795 (70.38%)	82821 (29.62%)	279616	151162 (54.9%)	124201 (45.1%)	275363	139282 (49.47%)	142245 (50.53%)	281527	71116 (25.23%)	210739 (74.77%)	281855	170221 (62.17%)	103575 (37.83%)	273796
Wheeler	338 (40.67%)	493 (59.33%)	831	258 (31.62%)	558 (68.38%)	816	207 (24.82%)	627 (75.18%)	834	132 (15.77%)	705 (84.23%)	837	303 (37.04%)	515 (62.96%)	818
Yamhill	30578 (56.61%)	23433 (43.39%)	54011	22605 (42.22%)	30932 (57.78%)	53537	19235 (35.18%)	35439 (64.82%)	54674	10499 (19.11%)	44429 (80.89%)	54928	25518 (47.88%)	27773 (52.12%)	53291
