= Jewel Lansing =

American writer and politician (1930–2024)

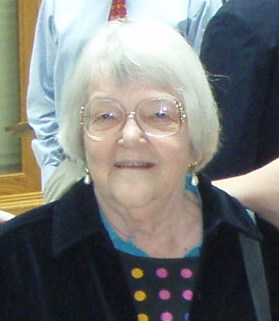
Jewel Lansing, 2009

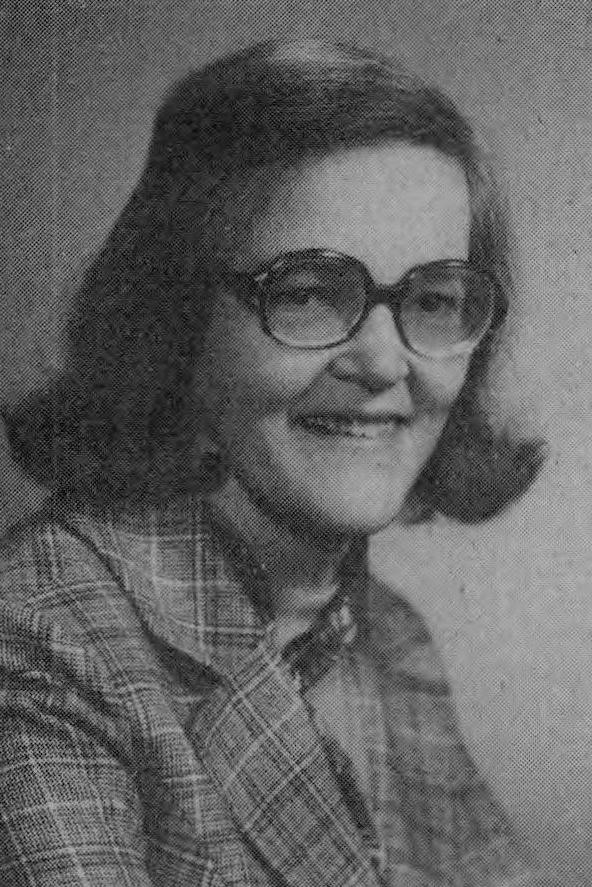
Jewel Lansing in the 1976 Marion County Voters' Pamphlet

Jewel Beck Lansing (May 13, 1930 – April 10, 2024) was an American writer and politician from Portland in the U.S. state of Oregon. She served as Portland City Auditor from 1983 to 1986.

== Early life and education ==
Lansing grew up in rural Montana. She received a bachelor's degree in journalism from the University of Montana and a master's degree in education from Stanford University. She moved to Portland in 1961.

== Political career ==
Lansing pioneered performance auditing in Portland and Multnomah County. She served as Multnomah County auditor from 1975 to 1982, and Portland City Auditor from 1983 to 1986. She was one of the first two women elected to Multnomah County government, and was the fifth elected to Portland government.

She was also the Democratic nominee for Treasurer of Oregon in 1976 and 1980, narrowly losing to Republican Clay Myers in both general elections.

== Personal life and death ==
Lansing was married and lived in southwest Portland with her husband, Ron. The couple raised two daughters, and a son. She died on April 10, 2024, at the age of 93.

== Books authored ==
Lansing published several books.

- Portland: People, Politics, and Power, 1851-2001. Oregon State University Press, 2003.
- Campaigning for Office: A Woman Runs (out of print). R & E Publishers, 1991.
- 101 Campaign Tips for Women Candidates and Their Staffs (out of print). R & E Publishers, 1991.
- Deadly Games in City Hall (fiction/murder mystery). Skylark Press, 1997.
- My Montana: A History and Memoir, 1930 to 1950. Inkwater Press, 2007.
- A Czech Family Heritage: Bohemia-U.S.A. - 1765-1996 (out of print)
- with Ole J. Lokberg: The Beck Family Book: Norway-U.S.A. - 1700-1989 (out of print)
- with Fred Leeson: Multnomah: The Tumultuous Story of Oregon's Most Populous County. Oregon State University Press, 2012.
