= Patrick Sheehan (Oregon politician) =

Member of the Oregon House of Representatives

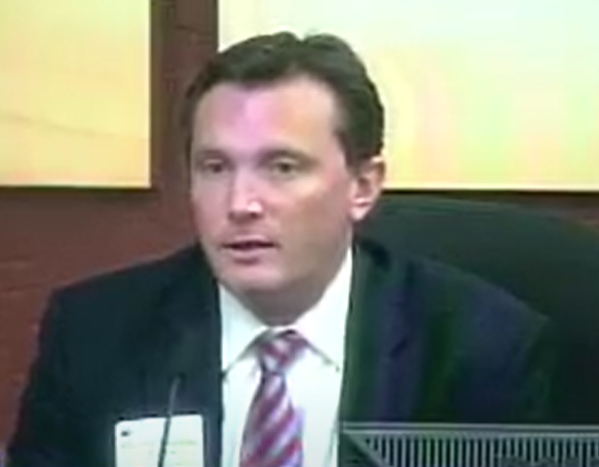
- Sheehan in 2012

Member of the Oregon House of Representatives from the 51st district
- In office January 10, 2011 – January 14, 2013
- Preceded by: Brent Barton
- Succeeded by: Shemia Fagan

Personal details
- Party: Republican
- Patrick Sheehan's voice Sheehan speaking at a debate before the 2012 Oregon House of Representatives election Recorded October 23, 2012

Patrick Sheehan is an American former Republican politician and current real estate agent. He served in the Oregon House of Representatives from 2011 until 2013, representing the 51st district, which includes Clackamas, Happy Valley, Sunnyside, Damascus, and parts of southeast Portland.

In 2010, Democrat Brent Barton declined to run for reelection in order to run for the Oregon Senate. Sheehan received 12,409 votes in the general election, compared to Democrat Cheryl Myers' 10,330. In 2012, Sheehan lost to Democrat Shemia Fagan, receiving 11,199 votes to Fagan's 12,584.

== Electoral history ==
2010 Oregon State Representative, 51st district
Party	Candidate	Votes	%
Republican	Patrick Sheehan	12,409	54.5
Democratic	Cheryl Myers	10,330	45.3
Write-in		42	0.2
Total votes		22,781	100%

2012 Oregon State Representative, 51st district
Party	Candidate	Votes	%
Democratic	Shemia Fagan	12,584	52.8
Republican	Patrick Sheehan	11,199	47.0
Write-in		66	0.3
Total votes		23,849	100%
