= American Coalition of Life Activists =

American anti-abortion group, 1994–2002

The American Coalition of Life Activists (ACLA) was a controversial anti-abortion advocacy group in the United States. The organization was known for its extreme tactics, including the creation of "wanted-style" posters targeting abortion providers, which led to significant legal battles over the limits of free speech and the definition of threats.

== History ==
During a 1995 meeting, the group unveiled a "wanted" poster that listed the names and addresses of a "Deadly Dozen" abortion providers. The poster accused them of "crimes against humanity" and offered a $5,000 reward for the "arrest, conviction and revocation of license to practice medicine" of these physicians. The poster was published in Life Advocate magazine. A second poster targeted a doctor, Robert Crist, offered a reward for persuading him "to turn from his child killing," and included his name, address, and photo.

In 1996 the coalition revealed its "Nuremberg Files" which included dossiers on abortion providers, politicians, judges, clinic employees and other abortion rights supporters. They claimed that these dossiers could be used for trials for "crimes against humanity" when the nation's laws changed to prohibit abortion. Neal Horsley, an activist, published the information on his website. His website greyed the names of those injured and crossed out the names of those killed by anti-abortion activists.

== Legal Challenges ==
The ACLA's activities led to significant legal challenges, most notably in the case of Planned Parenthood of Columbia/Willamette v. American Coalition of Life Activists. Planned Parenthood successfully sued the ACLA, arguing that their posters and website constituted a threat to abortion providers. Although the posters and website did not contain explicit threats, the jury awarded $107 million in damages. The coalition appealed the verdict on First Amendment grounds. Initially, a panel of the 9th Circuit Court of Appeals overturned the verdict, ruling that the ACLA's actions were protected speech under the First Amendment since they did not directly threaten harm to the plaintiffs and were not communicated privately. However, the en banc 9th Circuit reversed this decision, holding that the ACLA could be held liable for damages because the website's content was intended as a deliberate threat, anticipating that someone might act on it, which is not protected by the First Amendment.

The decision was heavily influenced by the fact that several abortion providers had been murdered following the publication of such materials. The majority of the en banc Ninth Circuit concluded that the posters and website were designed to intimidate, rather than persuade, abortion providers, which constituted a "true threat" under the FACE Act.

== Broader Implications ==
The case highlighted the ongoing debate over the limits of free speech and the definition of threats. It underscored the tension between advocating controversial political views and inciting violence. Legal scholars and commentators have debated whether the court's decision appropriately balanced First Amendment protections with the need to prevent intimidation and violence against specific individuals.
