= 2022 Portland, Oregon, Auditor election =

2022 Portland City Auditor election
- May 17, 2022

Candidate	Simone Rede	Brian Setzler
Party	Nonpartisan	Nonpartisan
Popular vote	119,978	29,259
Percentage	80.22%	19.56%
Auditor before election
Mary Hull Caballero
Nonpartisan
Elected Auditor
Simone Rede
Nonpartisan

The 2022 Portland City Auditor election took place on May 17, 2022, to elect the Auditor of Portland, Oregon in the US. Incumbent Mary Hull Caballero did not seek re-election.

A two-way race between longtime government auditor Simone Rede and accountant Brian Setzler resulted in Rede winning with 80.22% of the vote in the primaries, avoiding a general election runoff.

== Candidates ==
- Simone Rede, government auditor
- Brian Setzler, accountant

== Results ==
2022 Portland City Auditor election
Party	Candidate	Votes	%
Nonpartisan	Simone Rede	119,978	80.22%
Nonpartisan	Brian Setzler	29,259	19.56%
Nonpartisan	Write-ins	324	0.22%
Total votes		201,124	100

== See also ==
- 2022 Portland, Oregon City Commission election
