= Planned Parenthood of Columbia/Willamette v. American Coalition of Life Activists =

2002 US legal case

- Court: United States Court of Appeals for the Ninth Circuit
- Full case name: Planned Parenthood of Columbia/Willamette v. American Coalition of Life Activists
- Argued: December 11 2001
- Decided: July 10 2002
- Citation: 290 F.3d 1058

Case history
- Procedural history: Affirmed decision for the plaintiffs from 41 F. Supp. 2d 1130 (D. Or. 1999)

Holding
- “Pro-life” speech advocating violence against specific individuals is a true threat that is not protected by the First Amendment.

Court membership
- Judges sitting: Mary M. Schroeder (Chief Judge), Stephen Reinhardt, Alex Kozinski, Diarmuid O'Scannlain, Pamela Ann Rymer, Andrew Kleinfeld, Michael Daly Hawkins, Barry G. Silverman, Kim McLane Wardlaw, Marsha Berzon, Johnnie B. Rawlinson

Case opinions
- Majority: Rymer, joined by Schroeder, Hawkins, Silverman, Wardlaw, Rawlinson
- Dissent: Reinhardt, joined by Kozinski, Kleinfeld, Berzon
- Dissent: Kozinski, joined by Reinhardt, O'Scannlain, Kleinfeld, Berzon
- Dissent: Berzon, joined by Reinhardt, Kozinski, Kleinfeld, O'Scannlain

Laws applied
- First Amendment to the United States Constitution, Freedom of Access to Clinic Entrances Act

Planned Parenthood of Columbia/Willamette v. American Coalition of Life Activists, 290 F.3d 1058 (2002), (Note: Willamette, indicating a region in Oregon, is misspelled as "Williamette" in some Ninth Circuit documents.) was a freedom of speech case of the United States Court of Appeals for the Ninth Circuit over statements by anti-abortion activists who publicized personal information about specific abortion doctors, and indirectly suggested the possibility of violence against those individuals. The Ninth Circuit ultimately affirmed the decision of the United States District Court for the District of Oregon that the speech was a true threat that is not protected by the First Amendment to the United States Constitution.

== Background ==
In the mid-1990s, the American Coalition of Life Activists (ACLA) and affiliated groups distributed "WANTED" posters, with references to the anti-abortion Nuremberg Files, both in print form and over the Internet. The posters named four specific abortion doctors and two specific women's health clinics in Oregon, claiming that those doctors and their colleagues should be put on trial for crimes against humanity and found guilty. While the posters did not include direct calls to violent action, the targeted individuals sued under the Freedom of Access to Clinic Entrances Act (FACE) of 1994, which prohibits such a statement when "a reasonable person would foresee that the statement would be interpreted by those to whom the maker communicates the statement as a serious expression of intent to harm."

The ACLA claimed that the posters were protected as speech under the First Amendment. A jury at the United States District Court for the District of Oregon ruled in favor of the physicians in 1999, finding the posters to be threats under the FACE statute and enjoining ACLA from further distributing them. The jury also ordered the activists to pay damages of $108 million (later reduced to $4.3 million) to the targeted doctors. The ACLA appealed to the Ninth Circuit.

== Opinion ==
A three-judge panel at the Ninth Circuit initially overturned the jury verdict at the district court, holding that per First Amendment precedent, if the doctors faced threats they would most likely be from third parties who were inspired by the ACLA posters, but the ACLA would not be directly responsible. At the request of Planned Parenthood, this decision was reviewed by a larger en banc panel at the Ninth Circuit, to determine if the ACLA truly intended for its own members and agents to physically harm the physicians.

The en banc panel explored whether the "WANTED" posters distributed by ACLA, which included the names of the abortion doctors and their home addresses, constituted true threats that could be restricted and did not qualify for protection under the First Amendment. The en banc panel restored the district court 's jury verdict in favor of Planned Parenthood, overturning the earlier ruling by the smaller panel of judges.

In a 6-5 ruling, the en banc panel focused on the fact that three abortion doctors were known to have been murdered in the past after they had been pictured on similar "WANTED" posters distributed by anti-abortion activists. The majority distinguished political hyperbole, which is protected under the First Amendment, from true threats, which are not protected. The panel held that a true threat is one “where a reasonable person would foresee that the listener will believe he will be subjected to physical violence upon his person.” The posters were also found to be a "threat of force" of the type prohibited under the Freedom of Access to Clinic Entrances Act.

The majority also held that the original district court injunction against distributing the posters was supported by Supreme Court precedent, per Madsen v. Women's Health Center, as an acceptable technique for achieving safety for abortion providers while restricting speech as little as possible. In another Supreme Court precedent, Brandenburg v. Ohio, speech that indirectly advocates violence can be protected by the First Amendment, but only if violent action against a specific person is not imminently likely. Instead, the Ninth Circuit en banc panel found that the ACLA posters transcended mere hyperbole and advocated direct and imminent violent action against specific persons.

Several of the judges in the minority issued dissenting opinions, disagreeing that a reasonable person would view the posters as advocating direct and imminent lawless action, and suggesting that using contextual innuendo to restrict political expression could create a chilled speech effect.

== Impact ==
The ACLA attempted to appeal the Ninth Circuit decision to the U.S. Supreme Court twice, and both requests were rejected. The Ninth Circuit ruling was criticized in some quarters, as it was possibly influenced by post-September 11 fear about terroristic threats and could even prevent the media from discussing such threats. Others warned that while abortion doctors should not have to live under constant threat, the ruling could restrict many other types of political speech by conflating hyberbole and innuendo with true threats, while the ruling may have also expanded the "reasonable person" standard without sufficient support.
