= Planned Parenthood =

US nonprofit reproductive health services organization

- Planned Parenthood Federation of America, Inc.
- Abbreviation: PPFA
- Predecessor: American Birth Control League, Birth Control Clinical Research Bureau, Birth Control Federation of America
- Formation: October 16, 1916; 110 years ago (Note: Planned Parenthood dates its beginnings to 1916 when Margaret Sanger opened her first birth control center in Brooklyn. The American Birth Control League was founded by Sanger in 1921. Its successor organization was formed in 1939 and adopted the name Planned Parenthood in 1942.)
- Founder: Margaret Sanger
- Legal status: 501(c)(3)
- Purpose: Reproductive health and education
- Headquarters: Manhattan, New York City, U.S.; Washington, D.C., U.S.
- Region served: United States, and worldwide through Planned Parenthood Global and IPPF
- Members: 600+ clinic locations: ≈58 medical or related affiliates; ≈101 non-medical affiliates
- Key people: Alexis McGill Johnson; (president and CEO)
- Revenue: $392 million (2024)
- Expenses: $403 million (2024)
- Website: Official website

The Planned Parenthood Federation of America, Inc. (PPFA), or simply Planned Parenthood, is an American nonprofit organization that provides reproductive and sexual healthcare and sexual education in the United States and globally. It is a member of the International Planned Parenthood Federation (IPPF).

PPFA has its roots in Brooklyn, New York, where Margaret Sanger opened the first birth control clinic in the United States, in 1916. Sanger founded the American Birth Control League in 1921, and 14 years after her exit as its president, ABCL's successor organization became Planned Parenthood in 1942.

Planned Parenthood consists of 159 medical and non-medical affiliates, which operate over 600 health clinics in the United States. It partners with organizations in 12 countries globally. The organization directly provides a variety of reproductive health services and sexual education, contributes to research in reproductive technology and advocates for the protection and expansion of reproductive rights. Research shows that closures of Planned Parenthood clinics lead to increases in maternal mortality rates.

PPFA is the largest single provider of reproductive health services and the largest single provider of abortions in the United States. In its 2023 Annual Report, PPFA reported seeing over two million patients and performing a total of 9.13 million discrete services including 392,715 abortions. Its combined annual revenue is US$1.3 billion, including approximately $530 million in government funding such as Medicaid reimbursements. Throughout its history, PPFA and its member clinics have been the subject of support, criticism, controversy, protests, and violent attacks. (Note: For violence, see §Violence by anti-abortion activists.)

== History ==
=== Origins ===
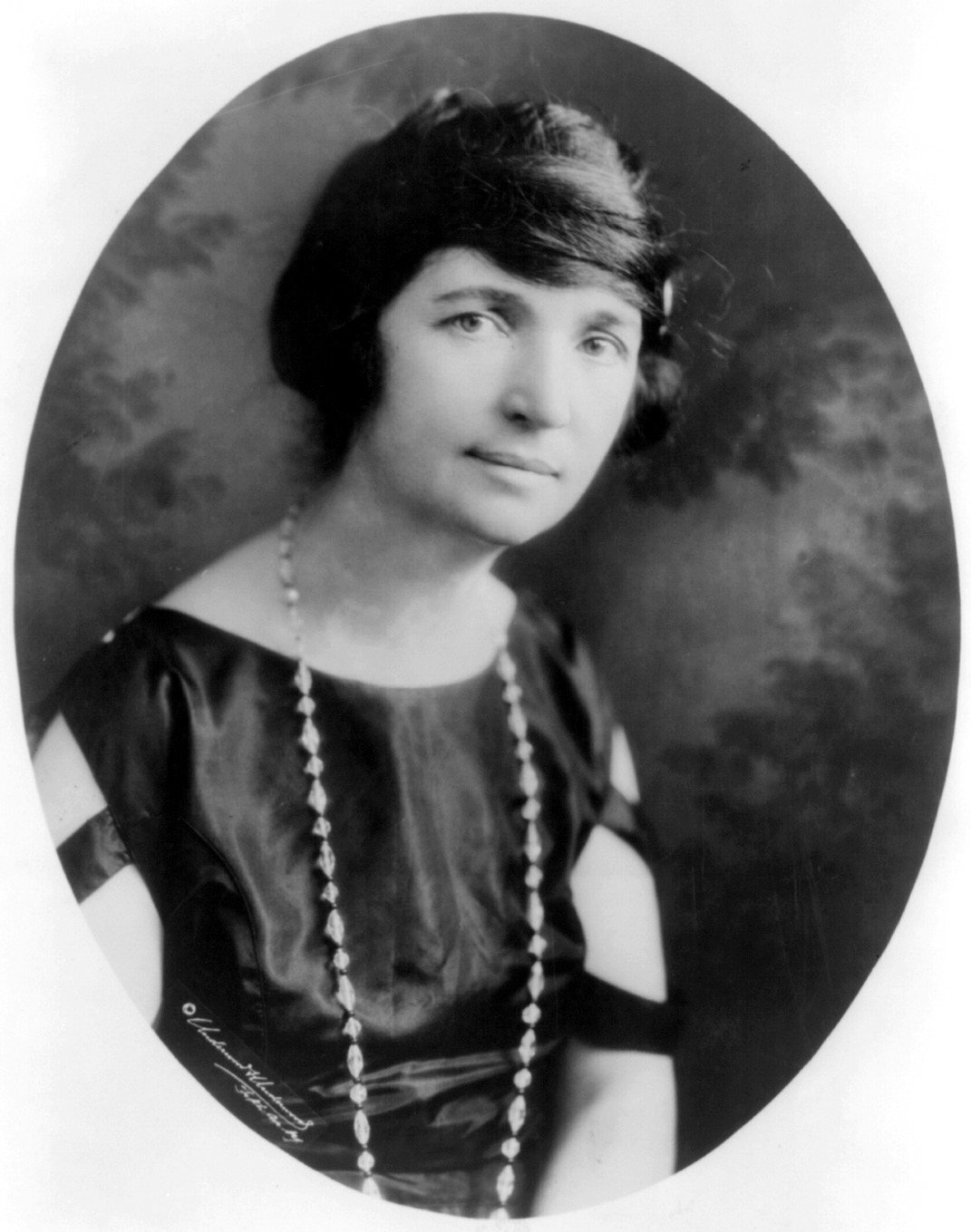
Margaret Sanger (1922), the first president and founder of Planned Parenthood

The origins of Planned Parenthood date to October 16, 1916, when Margaret Sanger, her sister Ethel Byrne, and Fania Mindell opened the first birth control clinic in the U.S. in the Brownsville section of the New York borough of Brooklyn. They distributed birth control, birth control advice, and birth control information. All three women were arrested and jailed for violating provisions of the Comstock Act, accused of distributing obscene materials at the clinic. The so-called Brownsville trials brought national attention and support to their cause. Sanger and her co-defendants were convicted on misdemeanor charges, which they appealed through two subsequent appeals courts. While the convictions were not overturned, the judge who issued the final ruling also modified the law to permit physician-prescribed birth control. The women's campaign led to major changes in the laws governing birth control and sex education in the United States.

In 1921, the clinic was organized into the American Birth Control League, the core of the only national birth-control organization in the U.S. until the 1960s. By 1941, it was operating 222 centers and had served 49,000 clients. In 1923, Sanger opened the Birth Control Clinical Research Bureau (BCCRB) for dispensing contraceptives under the supervision of licensed physicians and studying their effectiveness.

Some found the ABCL's title offensive and "against families", so the League began discussions for a new name. In 1938, a group of private citizens organized the Citizens Committee for Planned Parenthood to aid the American Birth Control League in spreading scientific knowledge about birth control to the general public. The BCCRB merged with the ABCL in 1939 to form the Birth Control Federation of America (BCFA). In 1942 the name of the BCFA was changed to the Planned Parenthood Federation of America.

=== 1940s–1960s ===
Under the leadership of National Director D. Kenneth Rose, the PPFA expanded its programs and services through the 1940s, adding affiliate organizations throughout the country. By the end of World War II, the Federation was no longer solely a center for birth control services or a clearing house for contraceptive information but had emerged as a major national health organization. PPFA's programs included a full range of family planning services including marriage education and counseling, and infertility services. The leadership of the PPFA, largely consisting of businessmen and male physicians, endeavored to incorporate its contraceptive services unofficially into regional and national public health programs by emphasizing less politicized aspects such as child spacing.

During the 1950s, the Federation further adjusted its programs and message to appeal to a family-centered, more conservative post-war populace, while continuing to function, through its affiliated clinics, as the more reliable source of contraceptives in the country.

From 1942 to 1962, PPFA concentrated its efforts on strengthening its ties to affiliates, expanding public education programs, and improving its medical and research work. By 1960, visitors to PPFA centers across the nation numbered over 300,000 per year.

Largely relying on a volunteer workforce, by 1960 the Federation had provided family planning counseling in hundreds of communities across the country. Planned Parenthood was one of the founding members of the International Planned Parenthood Federation when it was launched at a conference in Bombay (now Mumbai), India, in 1952.

In 1961, the population crisis debate, along with funding shortages, convinced PPFA to merge with the World Population Emergency Campaign, a citizens' fund-raising organization to become PPFA-World Population.

Both Planned Parenthood and Margaret Sanger are strongly associated with the abortion issue today. For much of the organization's history, however, and throughout Sanger's life, abortion was illegal in the U.S., and discussions of the issue were often censored. During this period, Sanger – like other American advocates of birth control – publicly condemned abortion, arguing that it would not be needed if every woman had access to birth control.

=== 1960s–present ===
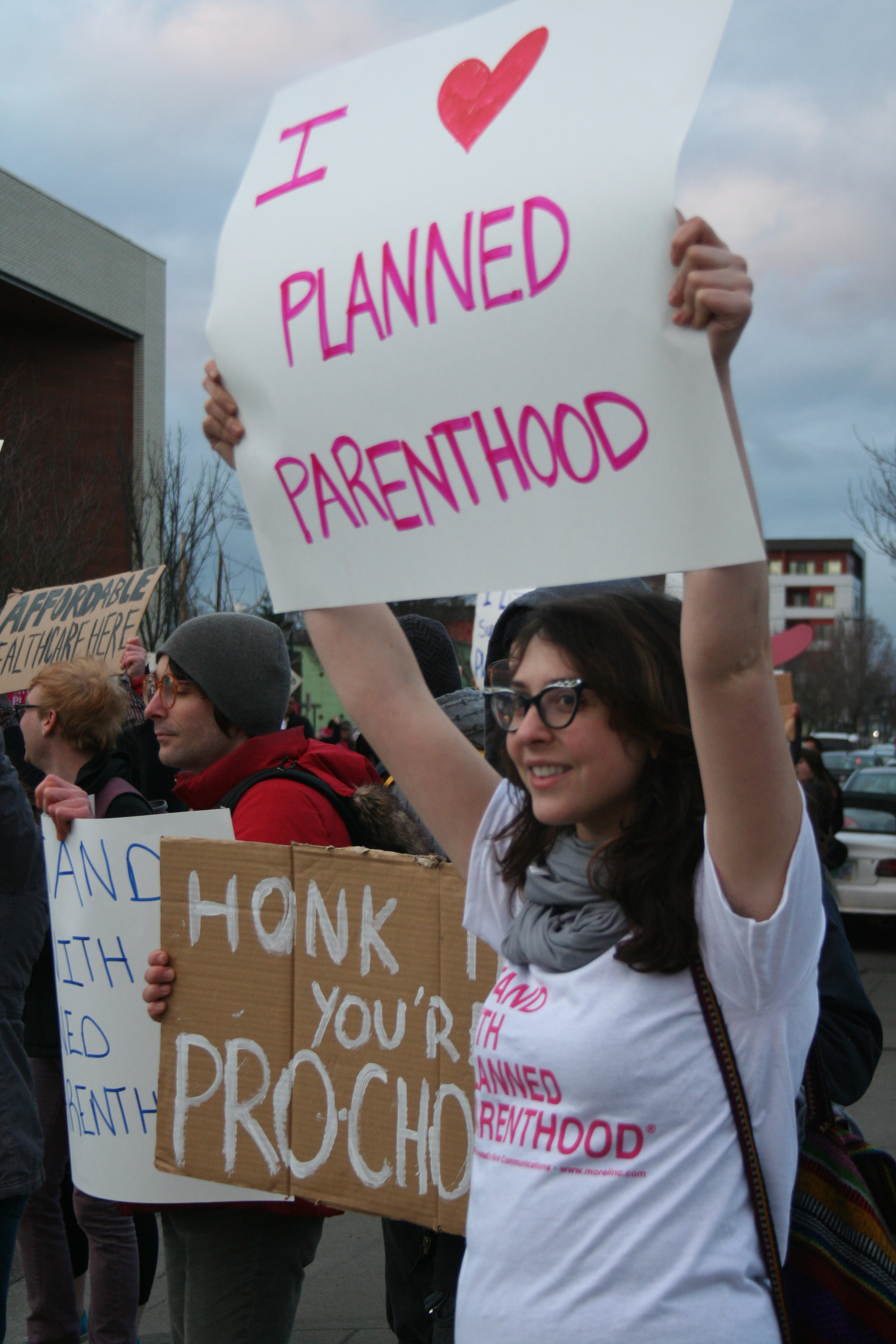
A Planned Parenthood supporter participates in a demonstration in support of the organization.

Following Margaret Sanger, Alan Frank Guttmacher became president of Planned Parenthood, serving from 1962 until 1974. During his tenure, the Food and Drug Administration (FDA) approved the sale of the original birth control pill, giving rise to new attitudes towards women's reproductive freedom. Also during his presidency, Planned Parenthood lobbied the federal government to support reproductive health, culminating with President Richard Nixon's signing of Title X to provide government subsidies for low-income women to access family planning services. The Center for Family Planning Program Development was also founded as a semi-autonomous division during this time. The center became an independent organization and was renamed the Guttmacher Institute in 1977.

Planned Parenthood began to advocate abortion law reform beginning in 1955, when the organization's medical director, Mary Calderone, convened a national conference of medical professionals on the issue. The conference was the first instance of physicians and other professionals advocating reform of the laws which criminalized abortion, and it played a key role in creating a movement for the reform of abortion laws in the U.S. Focusing, at first, on legalizing therapeutic abortion, Planned Parenthood became an increasingly vocal proponent of liberalized abortion laws during the 1960s, culminating in its call for the repeal of all anti-abortion laws in 1969. In the years that followed, the organization played a key role in landmark abortion rights cases such as Roe v. Wade (1973) and Planned Parenthood v. Casey (1992). Once abortion was legalized during the early 1970s, Planned Parenthood also began acting as an abortion provider.

Faye Wattleton became the first African American president of the Planned Parenthood Federation of America in 1978. Wattleton, who was also the youngest president in Planned Parenthood's history, served in this role until 1992. During her term, Planned Parenthood grew to become the seventh largest charity in the country, providing services to four million clients each year through its 170 affiliates, whose activities were spread across 50 states.

From 1996 to 2006, Planned Parenthood was led by Gloria Feldt. Feldt activated the Planned Parenthood Action Fund (PPAF), the organization's political action committee, launching what was the most far-reaching electoral advocacy effort in its history. The PPAF serves as the nonpartisan political advocacy arm of PPFA. It engages in educational and electoral activity, including legislative advocacy, voter education, and grassroots organizing to promote the PPFA mission. Feldt also launched the Responsible Choices Action Agenda, a nationwide campaign to increase services to prevent unwanted pregnancies, improve the quality of reproductive care, and ensure access to safe and legal abortions. Another initiative was the commencement of a "Global Partnership Program", to build a vibrant activist constituency in support of family planning.

On February 15, 2006, Cecile Richards, the daughter of former Texas governor Ann Richards, and formerly the deputy chief of staff to the U.S. Rep. Nancy Pelosi (the Democratic Leader in the United States House of Representatives), became president of the organization. In 2012, Richards was voted one of Time magazine's 100 Most Influential People in the World.

Richards' tenure as president of the organization ended on April 30, 2018. Current Planned Parenthood board member Joe Solmonese was appointed as transition chair to temporarily oversee the day-to-day operations of Planned Parenthood after Richards' departure.

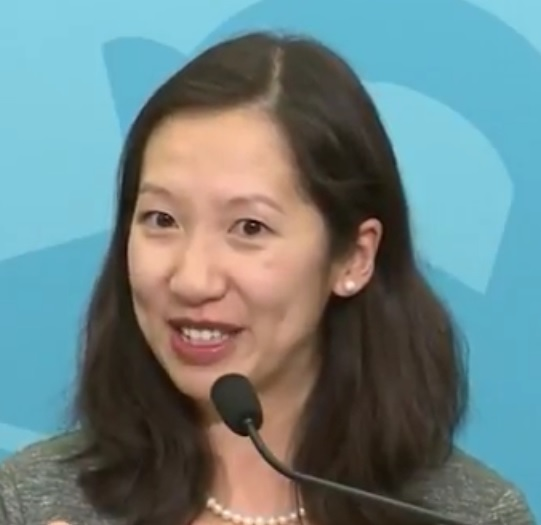
Leana Wen in April 2017

On September 12, 2018, the organization announced that Leana Wen would take over as president, effective November 2018. Wen was removed as president of Planned Parenthood by the organization's board of directors on July 16, 2019. Alexis McGill Johnson, a board member and former chairwoman, became the organization's acting president.

==== Unionization campaign ====
Since 2017, frontline Planned Parenthood staff have been publicly engaged in unionization campaigns at many Planned Parenthood locations. Workers have criticized the organization for its low salaries, poor working conditions and a disconnect between leadership and rank and file workers. Planned Parenthood Rocky Mountains challenged the results of its union election at the National Labor Relations Board and hired Fisher Phillips law firm to run an anti-union campaign, before eventually agreeing to a contract in 2018. Planned Parenthood North Central States disciplined its union's entire bargaining team and fired a union organizer after she accused a coworker of assault. The regional affiliate agreed to a contract in 2023 after 37 bargaining sessions over the course of 16 months.

==== Data breaches ====
In October 2021, a hacker gained access to the data network of the Los Angeles branch of Planned Parenthood and obtained the personal information of approximately 400,000 patients. On December 1, 2021, The Washington Post reported that the breach was a ransomware attack. The organization did not say if they paid the ransom or if the perpetrators made any demands. There was no indication as to who was responsible for the hack. The Metropolitan Washington branch of Planned Parenthood was also hacked in 2020 with donor and patient information compromised, including dates of birth, social security numbers, financial information, and medical data.

=== Margaret Sanger Awards ===
In 1966, PPFA began awarding the Margaret Sanger Award annually to honor, in their words, "individuals of distinction in recognition of excellence and leadership in furthering reproductive health and reproductive rights." In the first year, it was awarded to four men: Carl G. Hartman, William Henry Draper Jr., Lyndon B. Johnson, and Martin Luther King Jr. Later recipients have included John D. Rockefeller III, Katharine Hepburn, Jane Fonda, Hillary Clinton, and Ted Turner.

== Services ==
The services provided by PPFA affiliates vary by location, with just over half of all Planned Parenthood affiliates in the U.S. performing abortions. Services provided by PPFA include birth control and long-acting reversible contraception; emergency contraception; clinical breast examinations; cervical cancer screening; pregnancy testing and pregnancy options counseling; prenatal care; testing and treatment for sexually transmitted infections; sex education; vasectomies; LGBT services; and abortion. Contrary to the assumption of some, Planned Parenthood conducts cancer screenings but does not provide mammograms, although Planned Parenthood physicians do refer their patients to other outside clinics where they can get mammograms.

In 2013, PPFA reported seeing 2.7 million patients in 4.6 million clinical visits. Roughly 16 percent of its clients are teenagers. According to PPFA, in 2014 the organization provided 3.6 million contraceptive services, 4.5 million sexually transmitted infection services, about one million cancer related services, over one million pregnancy tests and prenatal services, over 324,000 abortion services, and over 100,000 other services, for a total of 9.5 million discrete services. PPFA is well known for providing services to minorities and to poor people; according to PPFA, approximately four out of five of their clients have incomes at or below 150 percent of the federal poverty level. Services for men's health include STI testing and treatment, vasectomy procedures, and erectile dysfunction services. Education is available regarding male birth control and lowering the risk of sexually transmitted infections.

In 2015, Planned Parenthood launched the Planned Parenthood Direct app, which – as of 2025 – focuses on delivering birth control pills, providing care for urinary tract infections (UTIs), and (in some states) delivering medication abortion pills directly to patients.

Planned Parenthood won the 2020 Webby Award for Machine Learning and Bots for their Sex Education chatbot.

== Facilities ==
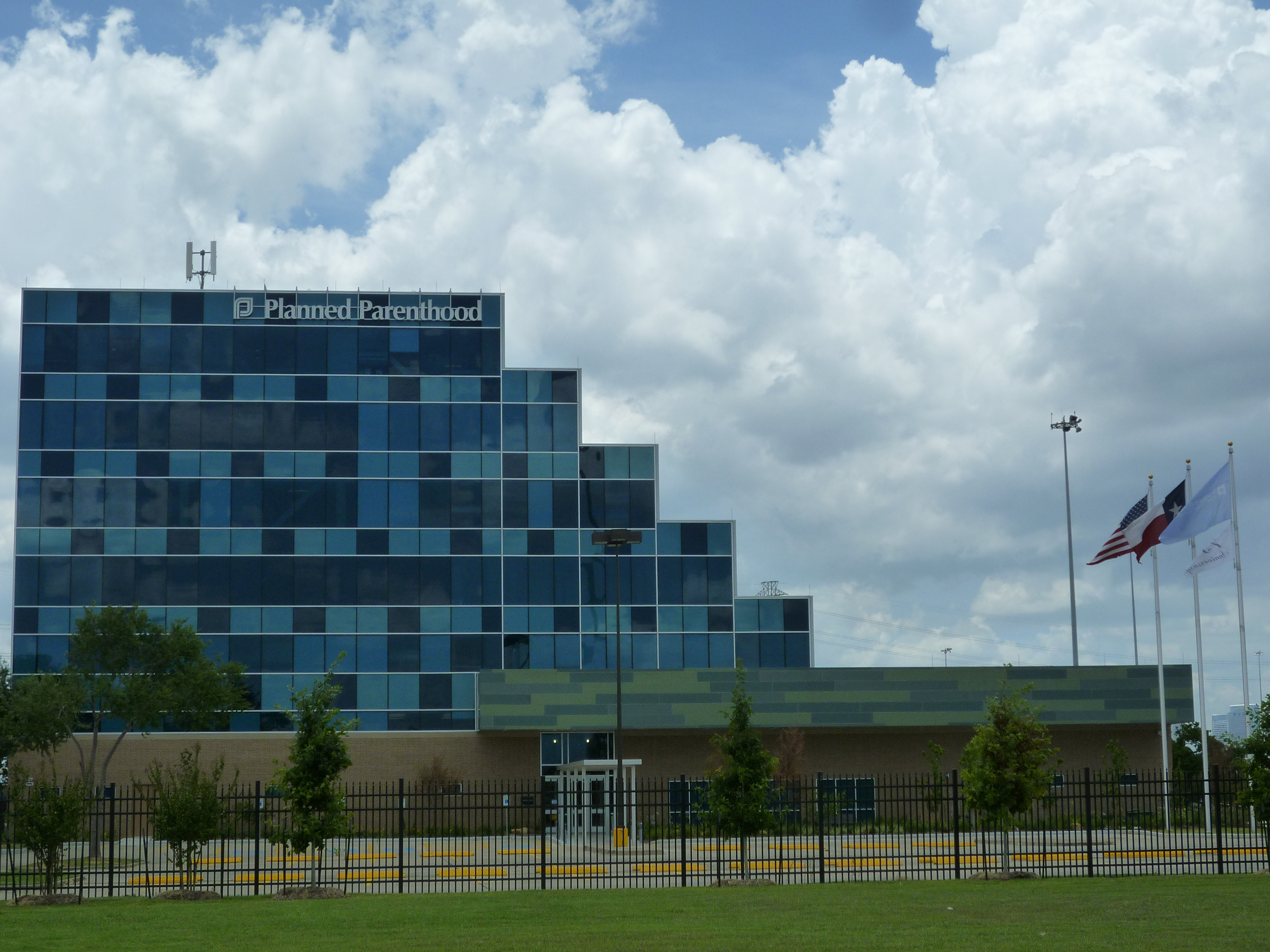
Location in Houston, Texas

PPFA has two national offices in the United States: one in Washington, D.C., and one in New York City. It has three international offices, including a hub office in London, England. It has 68 medical and related affiliates and 101 other affiliates including 34 political action committees. These affiliates together operate more than 700 health centers in all 50 states in the U.S. plus the District of Columbia. PPFA owns about $54 million in property, including real estate. In addition, PPFA spends a little over $1 million per year for rented space. The largest facility, a $26 million, 78,000-square-foot (7,200-square-meter) structure, was completed in Houston, Texas, in May 2010.

== Worldwide availability ==
PPFA's international outreach and other activities are performed by Planned Parenthood Global, a division of PPFA, and by the International Planned Parenthood Federation (IPPF) which now consists of more than 149 Member Associations working in more than 189 countries. The IPPF is further associated with International Planned Parenthood Federation affiliates in the Caribbean and the Americas, and IPPF European Network, as well as other organizations like Family Planning Queensland, Pro Familia (Germany) (de) and mouvement français pour le planning familial (French Movement for Family Planning) (fr). Offices are located in New York, NY; Washington, D.C.; Miami, FL; Guatemala City, Guatemala; Abuja, Nigeria; and Nairobi, Kenya. The organization's focus countries are Guatemala, Nicaragua, Costa Rica, Ecuador, Peru, Senegal, Burkina Faso, Nigeria, Sudan, South Sudan, Uganda, Ethiopia, and Kenya. The Bloomberg Philanthropies donated $50 million for Planned Parenthood Global's reproductive health and family planning efforts in Tanzania, Nicaragua, Burkina Faso, Senegal and Uganda. Among specific countries and territories serviced by Planned Parenthood Global's reproductive planning outreach are Brazil, Colombia, El Salvador, French Guiana, Guatemala, Haiti, Honduras, Martinique, Mexico, Panama, Paraguay, Peru, Suriname, Venezuela, Puerto Rico, U.S. Virgin Islands, Dominican Republic, Barbados, Bolivia, Ecuador, Guadeloupe, Saint Martin, Guyana, Cape Verde and Samoa.

== Funding ==
Planned Parenthood has received federal funding since 1970, when President Richard Nixon signed into law the Family Planning Services and Population Research Act, amending the Public Health Service Act. Title X of that law provides funding for family planning services, including contraception and family planning information. The law had support from both Republicans and Democrats. Nixon described Title X funding as based on the premise that "no American woman should be denied access to family planning assistance because of her economic condition."

Donors to Planned Parenthood have included the Bill & Melinda Gates Foundation, the Buffett Foundation, the Ford Foundation, the Turner Foundation, the Cullmans, and others. The Bill & Melinda Gates Foundation's contributions to the organization have been specifically marked to avoid funding abortions. Some donors, such as the Buffett Foundation, have supported reproductive health that can include abortion services. Anti-abortion groups have advocated the boycott of donors to Planned Parenthood. Corporate donors include CREDO Mobile.

In the fiscal year ending June 30, 2023, total revenue was $2,026 million: non-government health services revenue was $350 million, government revenue (such as Medicaid reimbursements) was $792 million, private contributions totaled $684 million, and $210 million came from other operating revenue. According to Planned Parenthood, 64 percent of the group's revenue is put towards the provision of health services, while non-medical services such as sex education and public policy work make up another 12 percent. Management expenses, fundraising, and international family planning programs account for about 24 percent.

Planned Parenthood receives over a third of its money in government grants and contracts (about $792 million in FY 2022). By law (Hyde Amendment), federal funding cannot be allocated for abortions (except in rare cases), but some opponents of abortion have argued that allocating money to Planned Parenthood for the provision of other medical services allows other funds to be reallocated for abortions.

A coalition of national and local anti-abortion groups have lobbied federal and state governments to stop funding Planned Parenthood. As a result, federal and state legislators have proposed legislation to reduce funding levels. Eight states‍—‌Alabama, Arkansas, Indiana, Kansas, Louisiana, New Hampshire, Ohio, and Utah‍—‌have enacted such proposals. In some cases, the courts have overturned such actions, citing conflict with federal or state laws; in others the federal executive branch has provided funding in lieu of the states. In some states, Planned Parenthood was completely or partially defunded.

In August 2015, Louisiana governor Bobby Jindal attempted to end Louisiana's contract with Planned Parenthood to treat Medicaid patients at a time when there was an epidemic of sexually transmitted infections in Louisiana. Planned Parenthood and three patients sued the state of Louisiana, with the United States Department of Justice siding with Planned Parenthood.

On February 2, 2016, the U.S. House failed to override President Obama's veto of H.R. 3762 (Restoring Americans' Healthcare Freedom Reconciliation Act of 2015) which would have prohibited Planned Parenthood from receiving any federal Medicaid funds for one year.

Late in 2016, the Obama administration issued a rule effective in January 2017 banning U.S. states from withholding federal family-planning funds from health clinics that give abortions, including Planned Parenthood affiliates; this rule mandates that local and state governments give federal funds for services related to sexually transmitted infections, pregnancy care, fertility, contraception, and breast and cervical cancer screening to qualified health providers whether or not they give abortions. However, this rule was blocked by a federal judge the day before it would have taken effect. In 2017, it was overturned by new legislation.

The proposed American Health Care Act (H.R. 1628), announced by Congressional Republicans in March 2017, would have made Planned Parenthood "ineligible for Medicaid reimbursements or federal family planning grants."

On August 19, 2019, Planned Parenthood voluntarily withdrew from Title X funding due to a regulatory gag order stating that medical institutions that receive Title X funding cannot refer patients for abortions.

Planned Parenthood Federation of America, Inc. v. Kennedy
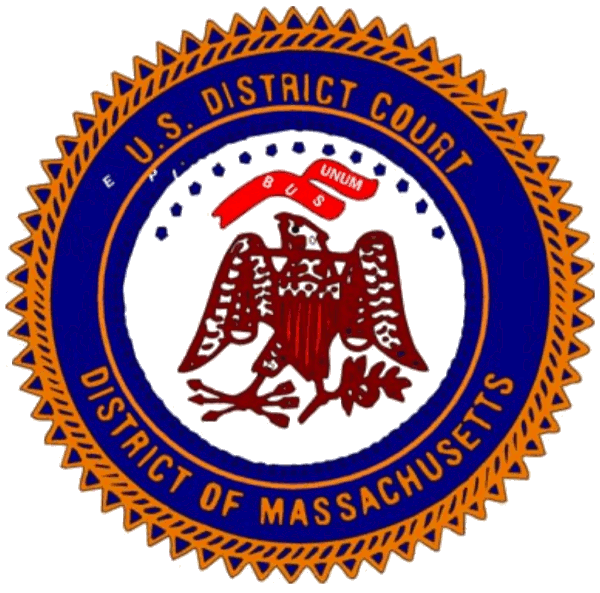
- Court: District of Massachusetts
- Started: July 7, 2025
- Docket nos.: 1:25-cv-11913 (D. Mass.); 25-1698 (1st Cir.)

Case history
- Appealed to: First Circuit

Outcome
- Dismissed by plaintiffs in January 2026

Court membership
- Judge sitting: Indira Talwani

The One Big Beautiful Bill Act, passed in July 2025, placed a one year prohibition on Medicaid being used to fund any organizations which receive over $800,000 in Medicaid funding and provide abortions. In July 2025, Planned Parenthood sued the Trump administration over the provision and a federal judge issued a temporary injunction against defunding. In September 2025, the First U.S. Circuit Court of Appeals overrode the injunction, allowing defunding. In January 2026, Planned Parenthood filed a notice of voluntary dismissal.

== Political advocacy ==
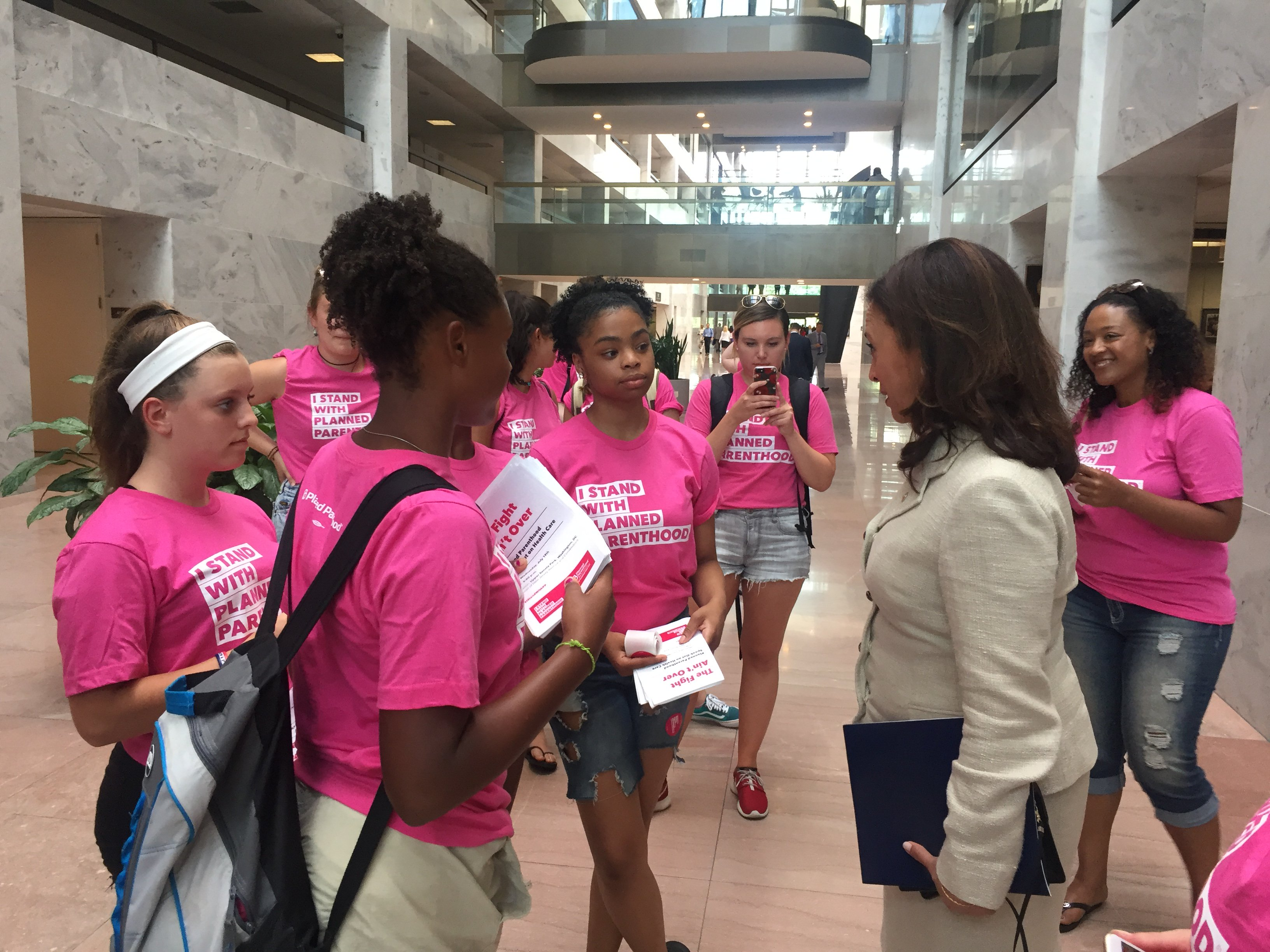
Planned Parenthood activists meeting with then-Senator Kamala Harris in 2017

Planned Parenthood is an advocate for the legal and political protection of reproductive rights. This advocacy includes helping to sponsor abortion rights and women's rights events. The Federation opposes restrictions on women's reproductive health services, including parental consent laws for minors. To justify this position, Planned Parenthood has cited the case of Becky Bell, who died following an illegal abortion rather than seek parental consent for a legal one. Planned Parenthood also takes the position that laws requiring parental notification before an abortion can be performed on a minor are unconstitutional on privacy grounds.

The organization opposes laws requiring ultrasounds before abortions, stating that their only purpose is to make abortions more difficult to obtain. Planned Parenthood has also opposed initiatives that require waiting periods before abortions, and bans on late-term abortions including intact dilation and extraction, which has been illegal in the U.S. since 2003. Planned Parenthood supports the wide availability of emergency contraception such as the Plan B pill. It opposes conscience clauses, which allow pharmacists to refuse to dispense drugs against their beliefs. Planned Parenthood has been critical of hospitals that do not provide access to emergency contraception for rape victims. Citing the need for medically accurate information in sex education, Planned Parenthood opposes abstinence-only education in public schools. Instead, Planned Parenthood is a provider of, and endorses, comprehensive sex education, which includes a discussion of both abstinence and birth control.

Planned Parenthood's advocacy activities are executed by the Planned Parenthood Action Fund, which is registered as a 501(c)(4) charity, and files financial information jointly with PPFA. The committee was founded in 1996, by then-president Gloria Feldt, to maintain supportive health rights and supporting political candidates of the same mindset. In the 2012 election cycle, the committee gained prominence based on its effectiveness in spending on candidates. Although the Planned Parenthood Action Fund (PPAF) shares some leadership with the Planned Parenthood Federation of America, the president of PPAF, Cecile Richards, testified before Congress in September 2015 that she did not manage the organization. The Planned Parenthood Action Fund has 58 active, separately incorporated chapters in 41 states and maintains national headquarters in New York and Washington, D.C. Planned Parenthood has received grants from the Obama administration to help promote the Patient Protection and Affordable Care Act, or ObamaCare.

=== Political spending ===
Planned Parenthood spends money on politics and elections through the Planned Parenthood Action Fund (its federal political action committee), through its Super PAC, and through a variety of related 501(c)(4) entities. Planned Parenthood endorsed Obama in the 2008 and 2012 presidential elections. In the 2014 election cycle, Planned Parenthood spent $6,587,100 on contributions to candidates and political parties (overwhelmingly to Democrats) and on independent expenditures.

== Before the U.S. Supreme Court ==
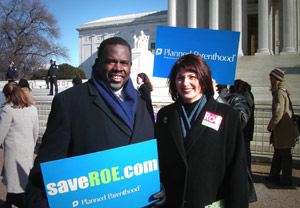
Former Planned Parenthood president Gloria Feldt with Congressman Albert Wynn in front of the U.S. Supreme Court

Planned Parenthood regional chapters have been active in the American courts. Several cases in which Planned Parenthood has been a party have reached the U.S. Supreme Court. Notable among these cases is the 1992 case Planned Parenthood v. Casey, the case that sets forth the current constitutional abortion standard. In this case, "Planned Parenthood" was the Southeast Pennsylvania Chapter, and "Casey" was Robert Casey, the governor of Pennsylvania. The ultimate ruling was split, and Roe v. Wade was narrowed but upheld in an opinion written by Sandra Day O'Connor, Anthony Kennedy, and David Souter. Harry Blackmun and John Paul Stevens concurred with the main decision in separately written opinions. The Supreme Court struck down spousal consent requirements for married women to obtain abortions, but found no "undue burden"—an alternative to strict scrutiny, which tests the allowable limitations on rights protected under the Constitution—from the other statutory requirements. Dissenting were William Rehnquist, Antonin Scalia, Clarence Thomas, and Byron White. Blackmun, Rehnquist, and White were the only justices who voted on the original Roe v. Wade decision in 1973 who were still on the Supreme Court to rule on this case, and their votes on this case were consistent with their votes on the original decision that legalized abortion. Only Blackmun voted to maintain Roe v. Wade in its entirety.

Planned Parenthood v. Casey, along with Roe v. Wade, was eventually overturned by Dobbs v. Jackson Women's Health Organization in 2022.

Other related cases include:

- Planned Parenthood of Central Missouri v. Danforth (1976). Planned Parenthood challenged the constitutionality of a Missouri law encompassing parental consent, spousal consent, clinic bookkeeping, and allowed abortion methods. Portions of the challenged law were held to be constitutional, others not. The decision was superseded by Dobbs v. Jackson Women's Health Organization (2022).
- Planned Parenthood Association of Kansas City v. Ashcroft (1983). Planned Parenthood challenged the constitutionality of a Missouri law encompassing parental consent, clinic record keeping, and hospitalization requirements. Most of the challenged law was held to be constitutional. The decision was superseded by Dobbs v. Jackson Women's Health Organization (2022).
- Planned Parenthood of Columbia/Willamette v. American Coalition of Life Activists (2002). The American Coalition of Life Activists (ACLA) released a flier and "Wanted" posters with complete personal information about doctors who performed abortions. A civil jury and the Ninth Circuit Court of Appeals both found that the materials were "true threats" and not protected speech. ACLA appealed the decision to the Supreme Court, but the appeal was rejected.
- Gonzales v. Planned Parenthood (2003). Planned Parenthood sued U.S. Attorney General Alberto Gonzales for an injunction against the enforcement of the Partial-Birth Abortion Ban Act of 2003. Planned Parenthood argued the act was unconstitutional because it violated the Fifth Amendment, namely in that it was overly vague, violated women's constitutional right to have access to abortion, and did not include language for exceptions for the health of the mother. Both the district court and the Ninth Circuit Court of Appeals agreed, but that decision was overturned in a 5–4 ruling by the Supreme Court.
- Ayotte v. Planned Parenthood of Northern New England (2006). Planned Parenthood et al. challenged the constitutionality of a New Hampshire parental notification law related to access to abortion. In Sandra Day O'Connor's final decision before retirement, the Supreme Court sent the case back to lower courts with instructions to seek a remedy short of wholesale invalidation of the statute. New Hampshire ended up repealing the statute via the legislative process. The decision was superseded by Dobbs v. Jackson Women's Health Organization (2022).
- Medina v. Planned Parenthood South Atlantic (2025). A South Carolina woman and Planned Parenthood South Atlantic challenged South Carolina's decision to exclude Planned Parenthood from the state's Medicaid program on the basis that it provides abortions. The Supreme Court ruled that Medicaid's "any-qualified-provider" provision does not clearly and unambiguously confer a private right upon a Medicaid beneficiary to choose a specific provider.

== Other court cases ==
Some state attorneys general have subpoenaed medical records of patients treated by Planned Parenthood. Planned Parenthood has gone to court to keep from turning over these records, citing medical privacy and concerns about the motivation for seeking the records.

In 2006, Kansas Attorney General Phill Kline, a Republican, released some sealed patient records obtained from Planned Parenthood to the public. His actions were described as "troubling" by the state Supreme Court, but Planned Parenthood was compelled to turn over the medical records, albeit with more stringent court-mandated privacy safeguards for the patients involved. In 2007 Kline's successor, Paul J. Morrison, a Democrat, notified the clinic that no criminal charges would be filed after a three-year investigation, as "an objective, unbiased and thorough examination" showed no wrongdoing. Morrison stated that he believed Kline had politicized the Attorney General's office. In 2012, a Kansas district attorney found that the practices of the Kansas City-area Planned Parenthood clinic was "within accepted practices in the medical community" and dropped all of the remaining criminal charges. In all, the Planned Parenthood clinic had faced 107 criminal charges from Kline and other Kansas prosecutors, all of which were ultimately dismissed.

In 2006, the Indiana Court of Appeals ruled that Planned Parenthood was not required to turn over its medical records in an investigation of possible child abuse. In 2005, Planned Parenthood Minnesota, North Dakota, and South Dakota was fined $50,000 for violating a Minnesota state parental consent law.

In 2012, a Texas state court judge, Gary Harger, denied Planned Parenthood's request for a temporary restraining order against the State of Texas, concluding that the State may exclude otherwise qualified doctors and clinics from receiving state funding if the doctors or clinics advocate for abortion rights.

In 2022, Nicole Moore, a Black woman who was the director of Planned Parenthood's multicultural brand engagement from January 2020 to November 2021, filed a lawsuit alleging that she faced months of racial discrimination while working at Planned Parenthood.

== Impact ==
A 2016 study found that the exclusion of Planned Parenthood-affiliated clinics from Texas's Medicaid fee-for-service family-planning program was linked to reductions in the provision of contraception and an increase in child-bearing for women who used injectable contraceptives and who were covered by Medicaid.

A 2020 study found that closure of Planned Parenthood clinics resulted in increases in the maternal mortality rate: "Planned Parenthood clinic closures negatively impacted all women, increasing mortality by 6–15% across racial/ethnic groups."

== Debate and opposition ==
=== Margaret Sanger and eugenics ===
In the 1920s, various theories of eugenics were popular among intellectuals in the U.S. In her campaign to promote birth control, Sanger teamed with eugenics organizations such as the American Eugenics Society, although she argued against many of their positions. Scholars describe Sanger as believing that birth control and sterilization should be voluntary, and not based on race. Sanger advocated for "voluntary motherhood"—the right to choose when to be pregnant—for all women, as an important element of women's rights. As part of her efforts to promote birth control, however, Sanger found common cause with proponents of eugenics, believing that she and they both sought to "assist the race toward the elimination of the unfit".

Critics of Planned Parenthood often refer to Sanger's connection with supporters of eugenics to discredit the organization by associating it, and birth control, with the more negative modern view of eugenics. Reacting to criticisms of Sanger's endorsement of eugenics, in 2020 Planned Parenthood took steps to distance itself from their founder by removing some mentions of Sanger from their website and renaming the Planned Parenthood building on Bleecker Street (which previously was named after Sanger). (Note: In 2016, Planned Parenthood had published a fact sheet explaining Sanger's positions on a variety of topics: "Opposition Claims About Margaret Sanger" (PDF). Planned Parenthood.) Essayist Katha Pollitt and Sanger biographer Ellen Chesner criticized Planned Parenthood for succumbing to pressure from the anti-abortion movement.

=== Abortion ===
Planned Parenthood has occupied a central position in the abortion debate in the U.S. and has been among the most prominent targets of the U.S. anti-abortion movement for decades. Some members of Congress, overwhelmingly Republican, have attempted since the 1980s to end federal funding of the organization, nearly leading to a government shutdown over the issue in 2011. Planned Parenthood has consistently maintained that federal money received by Planned Parenthood is not used to fund abortion services, but anti-abortion activists have argued that the federal funding frees up other resources that are, in turn, used to provide abortions.

Planned Parenthood is the largest single provider of abortions in the U.S., but pro-choice advocates have argued that the organization's family planning services reduce the need for abortions; in the words of Megan Crepeau of the Chicago Tribune, Planned Parenthood could be "characterized as America's largest abortion preventer". Anti-abortion activists dispute the evidence that greater access to contraceptives reduces abortion frequency.

==== Undercover videos by anti-abortion activists ====
Periodically, anti-abortion advocates have tried to demonstrate that Planned Parenthood does not follow applicable state or federal laws. The groups called or visited Planned Parenthood health centers posing as victims of statutory rape, minors who by law need parental notification before an abortion, racist donors seeking to earmark donations to reduce the African American population, or pimps seeking abortions for underage prostitutes. As a result of some of these videos, several Planned Parenthood workers have been disciplined or fired. An article in Salon stated that a 2005 inspection by the Bush administration's Department of Health and Human Services "yielded no evidence of clinics around the nation failing to comply with laws on reporting child abuse, child molestation, sexual abuse, rape or incest".

===== Live Action videos =====
Beginning in 2010, Live Action released several series of undercover videos filmed in Planned Parenthood centers. Live Action said one series showed Planned Parenthood employees at many affiliates actively assisting or being complicit in aiding a prostitution ring, advising patients on how to procure sex-selective abortions. No criminal convictions resulted, but some Planned Parenthood employees and volunteers were fired for not following procedure, and the organization committed to retraining its staff. Additionally, one center was placed on probation.

===== Center for Medical Progress videos =====
In 2015, an anti-abortion organization named the Center for Medical Progress (CMP) released several videos that had been secretly recorded. Members of the CMP posed as representatives of a biotechnology company in order to gain access to both meetings with abortion providers and abortion facilities. The videos showed how abortion providers made fetal tissue available to researchers, although no problems were found with the legality of the process. All of the videos were found to be altered, according to analysis by Fusion GPS and its co-founder Glenn R. Simpson, a former investigative reporter for The Wall Street Journal. The CMP disputed this finding, attributing the alterations to the editing out of "bathroom breaks and waiting periods". CMP had represented a longer version of the tapes as being "complete", as well as a shorter, edited version. The analysis by Fusion GPS concluded that the longer version was also edited, with skips and missing footage. Nonetheless, the videos attracted widespread media coverage; after the release of the first video, conservative lawmakers in Congress singled out Planned Parenthood and began to push bills that would strip the organization of federal family planning funding. No such attempts by Congress to cut federal family planning money from Planned Parenthood have become law. Conservative politicians in several states have also used this as an opportunity to cut or attempt to cut family planning funding at the state level.

Officials in twelve states initiated investigations into claims made by the videos, but none found Planned Parenthood clinics to have sold tissue for profit as alleged by CMP and other anti-abortion groups. An investigation by the U.S. House of Representatives Oversight and Government Reform Committee found no evidence of wrongdoing by Planned Parenthood. A select committee, the U.S. House Committee on Energy and Commerce Select Investigative Panel on Planned Parenthood, was formed to further investigate Planned Parenthood. The Republican-controlled Select Investigative Panel released its final report on December 30, 2016, recommending that Planned Parenthood be defunded. The report was heavily criticized as partisan and inaccurate by Democratic members of the committee, Planned Parenthood, and some news media.

In January 2016, a Texas grand jury chartered to investigate Planned Parenthood found no wrongdoing by Planned Parenthood but instead indicted CMP founder David Daleiden and member Sandra Merritt for creating and using false government IDs and attempting to purchase fetal tissue. The charges against Daleiden and Merritt in Texas were dismissed six months later on the grounds that the grand jury's indictment authority had extended only to Planned Parenthood. In March 2017, Daleiden and Merritt were charged with 15 felonies in the State of California – one for each of the people whom they had filmed without consent, and one for criminal conspiracy to invade privacy. In June 2017, all the invasion of privacy charges (but not that of conspiracy) were dismissed with leave to amend, but in July 2017, the State of California re-filed amended charges.

== Violence by anti-abortion activists ==
In the U.S., abortion providers have been threatened with death, and facilities that provide abortions have been attacked or vandalized. Planned Parenthood clinics have been the target of many instances of violence by anti-abortion activists, including but not limited to bombing, arson and attacks with chemical weaponry. In 1994, John Salvi entered a Brookline, Massachusetts Planned Parenthood clinic and opened fire, murdering receptionist Shannon Elizabeth Lowney and wounding three others. He fled to another Planned Parenthood clinic where he murdered Leane Nichols and wounded two others. In 2012, a Grand Chute, Wisconsin, Planned Parenthood clinic was subject to a bombing perpetrated by an unknown individual. In 2015, a Planned Parenthood clinic in Pullman, Washington was heavily damaged by arson.

=== 2015 shooting ===
On November 27, 2015, a gunman shot and killed two civilians and a police officer during a five-hour gun battle at the Colorado Springs, Colorado clinic. The 57-year-old gunman, Robert Dear, surrendered to police and was taken into custody. During his arrest, he gave a "rambling" interview in which, at one point, he said "no more baby parts", echoing language used in the news media about the clinic following the Center for Medical Progress videos. Dear was declared incompetent to stand trial for the shooting, citing experts' finding that he has "delusional disorder, persecutory type" and is now confined indefinitely to a state mental hospital.

== See also ==
- Susan G. Komen for the Cure § Relationship with Planned Parenthood
- Timeline of reproductive rights legislation
- United States abortion-rights movement
