= Neal Horsley =

American anti-abortion extremist

- Born: Otis O'Neal Horsley, Jr. April 15, 1944; Bremen, Georgia, US
- Died: April 13, 2015 (aged 70); Carrollton, Georgia, US
- Political party: The Creator's Rights Party
- Spouse: Carol Horsley
- Children: Christian Horsley, Nathanael Horsley

Otis O'Neal Horsley, Jr. (April 15, 1944 – April 13, 2015) was a militant anti-abortion activist and Christian Reconstructionist who produced a website called the Nuremberg Files, which provided the home addresses of abortion providers in the United States.

== Early life and education ==
Otis O'Neal Horsley, Jr. was born on April 15, 1944 in Bremen, Georgia to Otis O'Neal Horsley, Sr. (1920 – 1943) and Miriam Horsley (née Adamson; 1922 – 2006). Horsley spent time in prison as a young man for marijuana distribution. Later, in 1985, he received a master's degree from Westminster Theological Seminary in Philadelphia, Pennsylvania.

== The "Nuremberg Files" ==
The Nuremberg Files is a website that displays the names and locations of various doctors who perform abortions throughout the United States. They came under fire as controversial because they provided photos, addresses, and other personal data of abortion providers. They also updated the listings of those doctors who had been killed or injured by anti-abortion activists, suggesting approval for such anti-abortion violence. The name is a reference to the Nuremberg Trials that took place shortly after World War II, where members of Nazi German leadership were sentenced to death and lengthy prison terms for their involvement in the Holocaust and other Nazi war crimes.

While the original site was shut down in 2002, it has reappeared more than once on other ISPs. Horsley was forced to change his Internet service provider numerous times due to the site's content, and his website has been hacked on several occasions.

It has been stated that information from the Nuremberg Files site was used by James Charles Kopp to track down and kill Buffalo doctor Barnett Slepian in 1998. Kopp fled the country (becoming a fugitive in Canada) but allegedly maintained contact with Horsley while on the run. Kopp was later arrested in France and extradited to New York, where he is serving a life sentence.

After Slepian's murder, Planned Parenthood's president Gloria Feldt denounced Horsley's website at a press conference. The publicity generated hundreds of thousands of hits (Horsley claimed 400,000). Horsley was named as a co-conspirator in a successful civil suit, Planned Parenthood v. American Coalition of Life Activists, filed by Planned Parenthood over the information compiled by him and "Unwanted Posters" of doctors, which was judged by the court to constitute a threat of violence, even without an explicit call to violence. The U.S. Supreme Court has twice refused to hear the case, upholding the ruling, but asking that the punitive damages be reconsidered. Punitive damages were reduced from $108 million to $4.7 million. The ruling also provides for $11 million in treble damages and $526,000 in compensatory damages.

As part of the judgment, Horsley was to take down the "Nuremberg Files" section of his website. The verdict was later overturned on appeal, and the files returned. The case was reheard en banc, and the court determined that the files constituted "true threats" that are not constitutionally protected. Karin Spaink ran a mirror of the site in the Netherlands for about a week after the district court decision. She later decided to take down the mirror website.

== Waagner incident ==
In 2001, self-described militant Clayton Waagner, an armed bank robber who had escaped from an Illinois prison, showed up at Horsley's home brandishing a firearm. Horsley alleged that Waagner told him that he was stalking and planned to kill 42 abortion clinic workers who were profiled on the website, and presented evidence that he was the author of hundreds of phony anthrax letters that had been sent to abortion clinics and elected officials. Going to the media after his meeting with Waagner brought more attention to Horsley and his website. Waagner was arrested in December 2001, and in December 2003, would be sentenced to 19 years in a federal prison in addition to 48 years for other crimes.

== Lawsuits ==
During an appearance on Upfront Tonight on CNBC, Geraldo Rivera accused Horsley of "aiding and abetting a homicide" in the Slepian murder. Horsley sued Rivera for libel and slander, but the 11th Circuit Court of Appeals found against Horsley, concluding that Rivera was merely "expressing his belief that Horsley shared in the moral culpability for Dr. Slepian's death". Horsley also unsuccessfully sued Gloria Feldt of Planned Parenthood and Kim Gandy of the National Organization for Women for similar statements.

== Run for governor ==
In 2010, Horsley ran unsuccessfully for governor of Georgia, under his Creator's Rights Party, on a nullification platform.

== Elton John ==
Horsley was arrested in 2010 for making terrorist threats, after posting a YouTube video stating: "We're here today to remind Elton John that he has to die". The charges were subsequently dropped.

== Bestiality ==
During an interview in 2005 Horsley said that he had engaged in bestiality when he was a 'rowdy' adolescent 'in a state of perpetual confusion' pre-conversion, saying "I did everything that crossed my mind that looked like I [...] I was a fool. When you grow up on a farm in Georgia, your first girlfriend is a mule."

== Death ==
Horsley died on April 13, 2015, in Carrollton, Georgia, two days before his 71st birthday.
