= Cheryl Myers =

American politician

Secretary of State of Oregon
- Acting
- In office May 8, 2023 – June 30, 2023
- Governor: Tina Kotek
- Preceded by: Shemia Fagan
- Succeeded by: LaVonne Griffin-Valade

Personal details
- Born: South Korea
- Political party: Democratic

Cheryl Myers is an American politician serving as the deputy Oregon secretary of state and tribal liaison since 2021. She was the acting secretary of state in 2023. A member of the Democratic Party, Myers ran for the Oregon House of Representatives in 2010 but was defeated by Republican Patrick Sheehan.

== Early life and education ==
Myers was born in South Korea and later orphaned. She was raised in Southeast Portland, after being adopted by a working-class Oregon family. She graduated from Marshall High School.

== Career ==
Myers began her career in public service as a member of the school board of the North Clackamas School District. She was appointed in 2005 and served until 2013, eventually becoming the school board chair. She later served on several other boards, including the Center for Women's Leadership, Planned Parenthood Columbia Willamette, Campus Compact, and Metropolitan Family Service. Since 2018, Myers has served on the board of directors of Holt International Children's Services, the organization that facilitated her own adoption process.

In 2010, Democrat Brent Barton declined to run for reelection in the 51st district of the Oregon House of Representatives in order to run for the Oregon Senate. Myers ran uncontested for the Democratic nomination but lost to Republican Patrick Sheehan in the general election, receiving 10,330 votes compared to Sheehan's 12,409. Sheehan lost reelection in 2012 to Democrat Shemia Fagan, Myers's future boss.

In 2011, Governor John Kitzhaber appointed Myers to work in the governor's office as an advocate for minority, women and emerging small business. She later served as Oregon's Director of Economic and Business Equity.

In December 2020, then Secretary-elect Shemia Fagan announced that she would appoint Myers as the Deputy Secretary of State. She was the first Asian American or Pacific Islander to serve in the position. She is also the tribal liaison.

On May 8, 2023, Myers assumed the role of acting Secretary of State following Secretary Fagan's resignation, prompted by concerns about her moonlighting as a consultant for a cannabis dispensary chain. As Oregon's chief elections officer, Myers presided over the local elections in Oregon on May 16, 2023. On June 30, 2023, Governor Tina Kotek appointed LaVonne Griffin-Valade to serve as the Secretary of State of Oregon, after which Myers resumed her role as the Deputy Secretary of State.

== Electoral history ==
=== 2010 ===
Oregon State House's 51st District Democratic Primary Election, 2010
Party	Candidate	Votes	%
Democratic	Cheryl Myers	3,354	98.07%
	Misc.	66	1.93%
Total votes		3,420	100%

Oregon's State House 51st District Election, 2010
Party	Candidate	Votes	%	±%
Republican	Patrick Sheehan	12,409	54.47%	N/A
Democratic	Cheryl Myers	10,330	45.34%	N/A
	Misc.	42	0.18%	
Total votes		22,781	100.0%	
Republican gain from Democratic				

== See also ==
- List of female lieutenant governors in the United States

Political offices
Preceded by Shemia Fagan	Secretary of State of Oregon; Acting; 2023	Succeeded by LaVonne Griffin-Valade
