= Planned Parenthood Direct =

American healthcare business

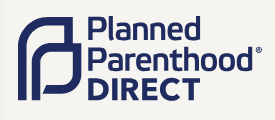
- Founded: 2015
- Owner: Planned Parenthood Direct
- Industry: Health Care
- Website: plannedparenthooddirect.com

Planned Parenthood Direct app
- Developer: Planned Parenthood Direct
- Release: 2015
- Operating system: iOS, Android, Web

Planned Parenthood Direct is mobile app that provides reproductive health services using a telehealth model. It is published by a healthcare corporation of the same name.

== History ==
Planned Parenthood Direct initiated services in 2015, when it launched the Planned Parenthood Direct app in California. At that time, the app's functionality focused on testing for sexually transmitted diseases (STDs). Testing kits are mailed directly to patients homes, then the patient sends the kit back, and the results are conveyed to the patient via the app.

By 2019, Planned Parenthood Direct was providing services in 27 states and Washington DC. The services focused on delivering birth control pills, and providing care for urinary tract infections (UTI). In September 2019, in response to government plans to reduce healthcare funding to Planned Parenthood, Planned Parenthood Direct created expansion plans to reach all fifty states.

In 2024, Planned Parenthood Direct expanded services to deliver medication abortion pills directly to patients in some states. Patient requests for medication abortion pills are provided to up to 10 weeks into pregnancy, and require a Planned Parenthood health care provider (physician or advanced practice nurse) to prescribe the drugs. If approved by the health care provider, the drugs are mailed directly to the home of the patient. This service is only available for patients that reside in states where medication abortion is legal.

== Services and products ==
The primary products of Planned Parenthood Direct are software apps that run on iPhones, Android phones, PCs, and Mac computers. The apps share the same name as the company: Planned Parenthood Direct. They also produce a web site accessible through web browsers that provides the same functionality as the phone app.

The apps and web site provide reproductive health services using a telehealth model, which permits users to obtain some health services from home, without visiting a physician's office. The provided services vary from state to state, depending on state law.

Services vary from state to state, but can include emergency contraception, testing for sexually transmitted diseases, birth control pills, and medication abortion.
