= Portland City Auditor =

Elected official of Portland City

Auditor of the City of Portland, Oregon
- Flag of Portland, Oregon
- Incumbent; Simone Rede since 2023
- Term length: Four years
- Formation: 1868
- Salary: $168,758
- Website: www.portlandoregon.gov/auditor/

The Portland city auditor is one of the fourteen citywide elected positions in Portland, Oregon (the others being the mayor and twelve city councilors). The auditor is functionally independent of City Council and accountable only to the public. The auditor exists "to promote open and accountable government by providing independent and impartial reviews, access to public information, and services for City government and the public." The current auditor, since January 2023, is Simone Rede.

== Duties ==
Portland has had a city auditor since 1868, and the position has been elected by voters since 1891.

== History ==
From 2015 until leaving office in 2022, Auditor Hull Caballero and the City Commission had disagreements as to the budget of the Auditor's office. Hull Caballero sought more autonomy for her office.

In 2020, Mayor Ted Wheeler was fined for making the list of his top contributors in a font "too small for the average reader" on campaign literature. City law requires the names of top donors on websites and literature of city candidates.

== List ==
Name	Term	Election	Previous office/occupation
A.L. Barbur	January 1907-July 1917		
George R. Funk	July 1917–February 1938 †		
Edwin W. Jones	February 1938–December 1938 ^{1}		
Will E. Gibson	December 1938–December 1958		
Ray Smith	January 1959–August 1970 †		
James L. Hamill	August 21, 1970–November 18, 1970		
George Yerkovich	November 19, 1970–December 1982		
Jewel B. Lansing	January 1983–December 1986		Multnomah County Auditor (1975-1982)
Barbara Clark	January 1987–December 1998		
Gary Blackmer	January 1999–May 2009 ^{2}		Multnomah County Auditor (1991-1998)
LaVonne Griffin-Valade	May 2009–December 2014		Multnomah County Auditor (2007-2009)
Mary Hull Caballero	January 2015–December 2022		
Simone Rede	January 2023–Present	2022, 2024	

=== Notes ===
1. Edwin W. Jones served as acting City Auditor due to the death of George R. Funk.
2. Blackmer resigned after being appointed as Oregon State Auditor by Governor Ted Kulongoski.

† died in office

== See also ==
- Government of Portland, Oregon
