= LaVonne Griffin-Valade =

American politician and author

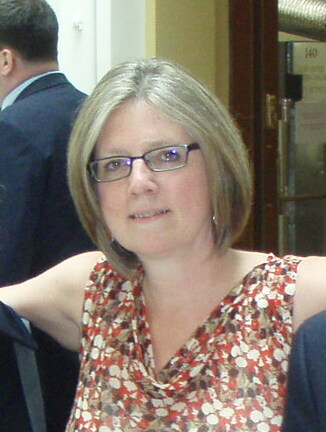
- Griffin-Valade in 2009

29th Secretary of State of Oregon
- In office June 30, 2023 – January 6, 2025
- Governor: Tina Kotek
- Preceded by: Cheryl Myers (acting)
- Succeeded by: Tobias Read

City Auditor of Portland
- In office May 2009 – December 31, 2014
- Preceded by: Gary Blackmer
- Succeeded by: Mary Hull Caballero

Multnomah County Auditor
- In office January 2007 – 2009

Personal details
- Born: 1952 or 1953 (age 72–73) John Day, Oregon, U.S.
- Party: Democratic
- Education: Western Oregon University (BA); Portland State University (MPA, MFA)

LaVonne Griffin-Valade (born 1952 or 1953) is an American politician and author who served as the 29th Oregon Secretary of State from 2023 to 2025. Following the resignation of Shemia Fagan as secretary of state, Governor Tina Kotek appointed Griffin-Valade to the office in June 2023 to complete Fagan's term, which ran until January 2025. Previously, Griffin-Valade was the Portland City Auditor and auditor for Multnomah County, Oregon. She has published four crime fiction novels as well as other essays and stories.

== Early life and education ==
Griffin-Valade was born in John Day, Oregon. Her mother worked in a mill and her father was a truck driver and member of the Teamsters. She was raised in a farmhouse between Dayville and Mount Vernon before her family moved to John Day. She attended Grant Union High School in John Day, but got married between her junior and senior years of high school and did not graduate. Griffin-Valade completed her high school education at Dayville School.

Griffin-Valade worked in the juvenile department of Crook County, Oregon, as an administrative assistant before attending Western Oregon University. She earned a bachelor's degree in humanities.

Griffin-Valade worked in Marion County, Oregon, as an elementary school teacher and mentoring homeless youth and in Washington County, Oregon, with youth in foster care who were aging out of the system. While she worked, Griffin-Valade attended Portland State University and graduated with a Master of Public Administration.

== Auditing and writing career ==
In 1998, Griffin-Valade was hired by the Multnomah County Auditor's Office as a senior management auditor. She was elected the auditor of Multnomah County in 2006, taking office in January 2007. After Gary Blackmer resigned as Portland City Auditor in the middle of his term in 2009, Griffin-Valade ran in a special election to succeed him, resigning her position as county auditor to run. She was unopposed in the election. Griffin-Valade chose not to run for reelection in 2014.

After she left office, Griffin-Valade enrolled at Portland State University and obtained her Master of Fine Arts. In 2021, she began to write crime fiction, releasing four crime novels about a sergeant in the Oregon State Police who returns to Grant County after a long absence. Griffin-Valade has also published essays in Oregon Humanities Magazine and a story in the 2019 Clackamas Literary Review.

== Secretary of state ==
Shemia Fagan, the Oregon Secretary of State, resigned her position in May 2023 after it was revealed that she was consulting for a cannabis company while her department was conducting an audit of the Oregon Liquor and Cannabis Commission (OLCC). On June 28, Governor Tina Kotek appointed Griffin-Valade to serve as secretary of state for the remainder of Fagan's four-year term, through January 2025. She was sworn into office on June 30. Griffin-Valade has stated that she does not plan to run for a full term in the 2024 election. Though the secretary of state is typically next-in-line in the succession to become governor, as Oregon does not have a lieutenant governor, Griffin-Valade is ineligible to succeed Kotek as governor as she is an appointee rather than elected official, and Tobias Read, the Oregon State Treasurer, is next-in-line behind Kotek.

Kotek directed the Oregon Department of Justice to investigate Fagan's audit of the OLCC. The review found that Fagan's consulting position did not influence the work of the auditors. Though an outside firm recommended that the audit be taken down, Griffin-Valade concluded that Fagan's conflict of interest did not compromise the audit and certified it.

In May 2023, Republican members of the Oregon Legislative Assembly began walking out of sessions to deny the Democratic majority a quorum, which in Oregon requires two-thirds of all members to be present. Ten members exceeded ten absences, a threshold set by Oregon Ballot Measure 113 to disqualify them from running for reelection. As the measure was not worded clearly, Deputy Secretary of State Cheryl Myers, serving as secretary of state on an interim basis after Fagan's resignation, requested an opinion from the Oregon Department of Justice. In August, Griffin-Valade announced that they were ineligible to run for reelection. Eight of the affected members sued Griffin-Valade to be restored to the ballot. On February 1, 2024, the Oregon State Supreme Court ruled that the members were ineligible to run for reelection.

An advocacy group challenging Donald Trump's eligibility to run for president for the 2024 United States presidential election contacted Griffin-Valade in July 2023 seeking to have her disqualify Trump from the Oregon ballot on the basis of Trump leading an insurrection against the United States with the January 6 United States Capitol attack, as specified by the Fourteenth Amendment to the United States Constitution. In November, she ruled that she did not have the authority to remove him from the Republican primary ballot as it is a nominating contest where the delegates selected choose the party nominees. The group sued Griffin-Valade to have Trump removed from the ballot.

== Personal life ==
Griffin-Valade has two children from her first marriage and two children with her second husband, Tom Griffin-Valade.

Griffin-Valade survived breast cancer in the 1990s.

== Electoral history ==
2006 Multnomah County auditor election
Party	Candidate	Votes	%
Nonpartisan	LaVonne Griffin-Valade	55,128	57.60%
Nonpartisan	Steve March	40,109	41.91%
Write-in		476	0.50%
Total votes		95,713	100.0%

Political offices
Preceded by Cheryl Myers; Acting	Secretary of State of Oregon; 2023–2025	Succeeded by Tobias Read
