= Oregon's 26th House district =

Legislative districts in the state of Oregon

Oregon's 26th House district after redistricting after the 2020 Census

District 26 of the Oregon House of Representatives is one of 60 House legislative districts in the state of Oregon. As of 2021, the boundary for the district contains portions of Clackamas and Washington counties. The district includes Wilsonville and Sherwood as well as parts of King City. Representative Courtney Neron Misslin left her office on May 9, 2025 to accept an appointment to the senate to finish out deceased Senator Aaron Woods's term. Sue Rieke Smith was appointed on June 7 to represent the district.

== Election results ==
District boundaries have changed over time. Therefore, representatives before 2021 may not represent the same constituency as today. General election results from 2000 to present are as follows:

Year	Candidate	Party	Percent	Opponent	Party	Percent	Opponent	Party	Percent	Write-in percentage
2000	Kathy Lowe	Democratic	65.47%	Al Ritter	Republican	34.53%	No third candidate			
2002 (Note: Jerry Krummel was the incumbent in this election. He previously represented District 27, but was moved to this district due to redistricting following the 2000 United States census.)	Jerry Krummel	Republican	63.67%	Rick Ross	Democratic	36.29%	No third candidate			0.04%
2004	Jerry Krummel	Republican	58.43%	Rick Ross	Democratic	38.70%	Charles Frank Radley	Libertarian	2.87%	
2006	Jerry Krummel	Republican	59.18%	Lee Coleman	Democratic	38.16%	Charles Frank Radley	Libertarian	2.53%	0.14%
2008 (Note: Matt Wingard was the incumbent in this election. He was appointed to this seat on August 20, 2008 to replace Jerry Kummel, who resigned from office.)	Matt Wingard	Republican	50.25%	Jessica Adamson	Democratic	44.56%	Marc Delphine	Libertarian	4.89%	0.29%
2010	Matt Wingard	Republican	61.15%	Sandy Webb	Democratic	38.66%	No third candidate			0.19%
2012	John Davis	Republican	55.47%	Wynne Wakkila	Democratic	44.31%	No third candidate			0.22%
2014	John Davis	Republican	57.85%	Eric Squires	Democratic	37.63%	Chuck Huntting	Libertarian	4.19%	0.33%
2016	Rich Vial	Republican	54.82%	Ray Lister	Democratic	45.04%	No third candidate			0.14%
2018	Courtney Neron Misslin	Democratic	50.82%	Rich Vial	Republican	47.03%	Tim Nelson	Libertarian	2.02%	0.14%
2020	Courtney Neron Misslin	Democratic	54.05%	Peggy Stevens	Republican	43.58%	Tim Nelson	Libertarian	2.27%	0.09%
2022	Courtney Neron Misslin	Democratic	53.24%	Jason Fields	Republican	46.69%	No third candidate			0.07%
2024	Courtney Neron Misslin	Democratic	56.1%	Jason Fields	Republican	43.8%	No third candidate			0.1%

== See also ==
- Oregon Legislative Assembly
- Oregon House of Representatives
