= Sue Rieke Smith =

American politician and teacher from Oregon

Member of the Oregon House of Representatives from the 26th district
- Incumbent
- Assumed office June 7, 2025
- Preceded by: Courtney Neron Misslin

Personal details
- Party: Democratic
- Profession: Teacher, politician
- Website: https://www.drsuefororegon.com/

Sue Rieke Smith is an American politician from Oregon. A Democrat, she represents District 26 in the Oregon House of Representatives. The district is located in northern Oregon and includes portions of Clackamas County and Washington County. She was appointed to fill the vacancy created by Courtney Neron Misslin, who was appointed to the Oregon Senate to fill a seat opened by the death of Senator Aaron Woods. She has worked as a trauma and public health nurse, educator, and as the superintendent of the Tigard-Tualatin School District and the Springfield School District.

== Education ==
Rieke Smith attended Pacific Lutheran University and earned a doctorate in educational leadership and policy at the University of Oregon in 2015.
