= Courtney Neron Misslin =

American politician and teacher from Oregon

Member of the Oregon Senate from the 13th district
- Incumbent
- Assumed office May 9, 2025
- Preceded by: Aaron Woods

Member of the Oregon House of Representatives from the 26th district
- In office January 14, 2019 – May 9, 2025
- Preceded by: Rich Vial
- Succeeded by: Sue Rieke Smith

Personal details
- Born: Courtney Brook Misslin; March 1979 (age 47)
- Party: Democratic
- Children: 2
- Education: University of Oregon
- Profession: Teacher, politician

Courtney Brook Neron Misslin (born March 1979) is an American politician and former teacher from Oregon. A Democrat, she has represented the 13th district in the Oregon Senate since 2025. She previously served in the Oregon House of Representatives, representing the 26th district from 2019 to 2025, anc chaired the House Education Committee. She was appointed to the Senate in May 2025 to finish the term of Senator Aaron Woods.

== Early life and education ==
Neron Misslin grew up in Tigard, Oregon. She earned a French degree from the University of Oregon and a Master's in Teaching from Pacific University. She taught French and Spanish at Tualatin High School, reading and special education in Milton-Freewater, and world languages at Tigard High School. She lives in Wilsonville with her two children.

== Political career ==
Neron Misslin was elected to the Oregon House in 2018, defeating Republican incumbent Rich Vial, and was re-elected in 2020, 2022, and 2024. She chaired the House Education Committee in the 2023 and 2025 sessions. After Senator Aaron Woods's death, Clackamas, Washington, and Yamhill county commissioners appointed her to the Senate. She won a full term in the seat in 2026, beating Republican Glenn Lancaster.

== Electoral history ==
2018 Oregon State Representative, 26th district
Party	Candidate	Votes	%
Democratic	Courtney Neron	17,211	50.8
Republican	Rich Vial	15,928	47.0
Libertarian	Tim E Nelson	683	2.0
Write-in		46	0.1
Total votes		33,868	100%

2020 Oregon State Representative, 26th district
Party	Candidate	Votes	%
Democratic	Courtney Neron	23,815	54.1
Republican	Peggy Stevens	19,201	43.6
Libertarian	Tim E Nelson	1,002	2.3
Write-in		40	0.1
Total votes		44,058	100%

2022 Oregon State Representative, 26th district
Party	Candidate	Votes	%
Democratic	Courtney Neron	17,606	53.2
Republican	Jason Fields	15,439	46.7
Write-in		24	0.1
Total votes		33,069	100%

2024 Oregon State Representative, 26th district
Party	Candidate	Votes	%
Democratic	Courtney Neron	20,931	56.1
Republican	Jason E Fields	16,345	43.8
Write-in		31	0.1
Total votes		37,307	100%
