= Fowler Middle School =

Fowler Middle School is the name of several middle schools located in the United States:

- Fowler Middle School, in the Frisco Independent School District of Frisco, Texas
- Fowler Middle School, in the Tigard-Tualatin School District of Portland, Oregon
