= Durham Education Center =

Alternative public school in Oregon, US

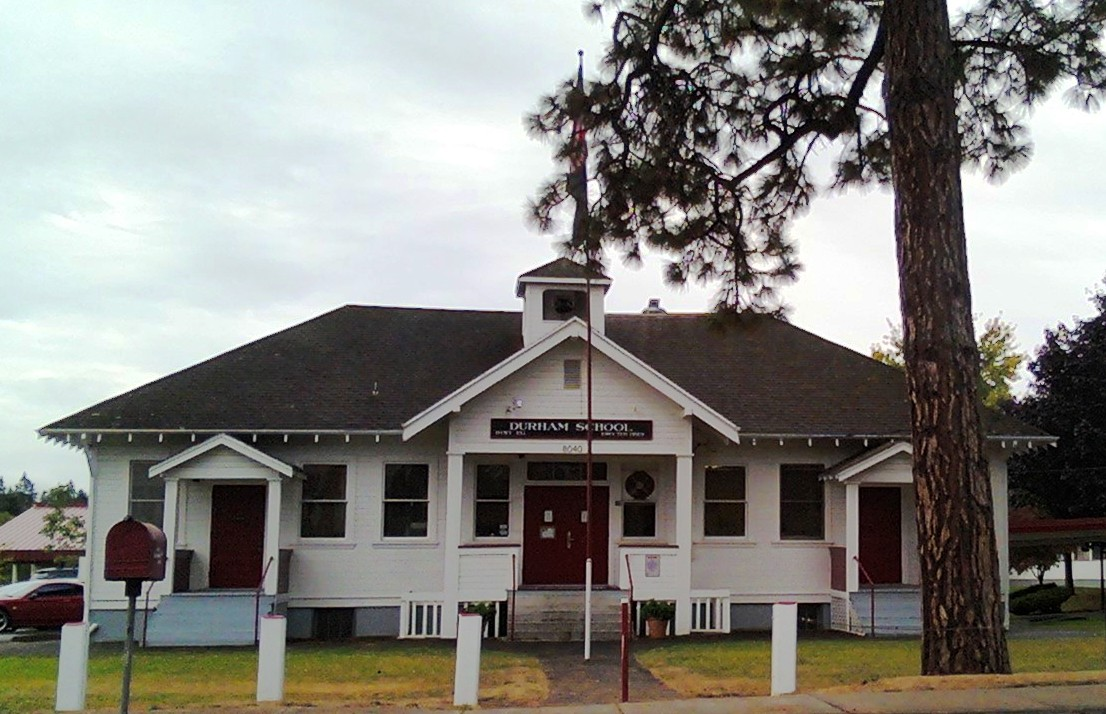

Location
- 8040 SW Durham Road; Tigard, Washington County, Oregon 97224; United States; 45.4039341°N 122.7599859°W

Information
- Type: Public
- School district: Tigard-Tualatin School District
- Principal: Jennifer Nelson
- Grades: 6-12
- Enrollment: 87
- Website: www.ttsd.k12.or.us/durham-education-center

Durham Education Center, also known as Durham Center, was a public alternative school in Tigard, Oregon, United States. As of 2019, Durham Center became Creekside Community High School.

== Academics ==
In 2008, 80% of the school's seniors received their high school diploma. Of 120 students, 96 graduated, 14 dropped out, and 10 are still in high school.
