= Bull Mountain, Oregon =

Unincorporated community in the state of Oregon, United States

- Unincorporated community
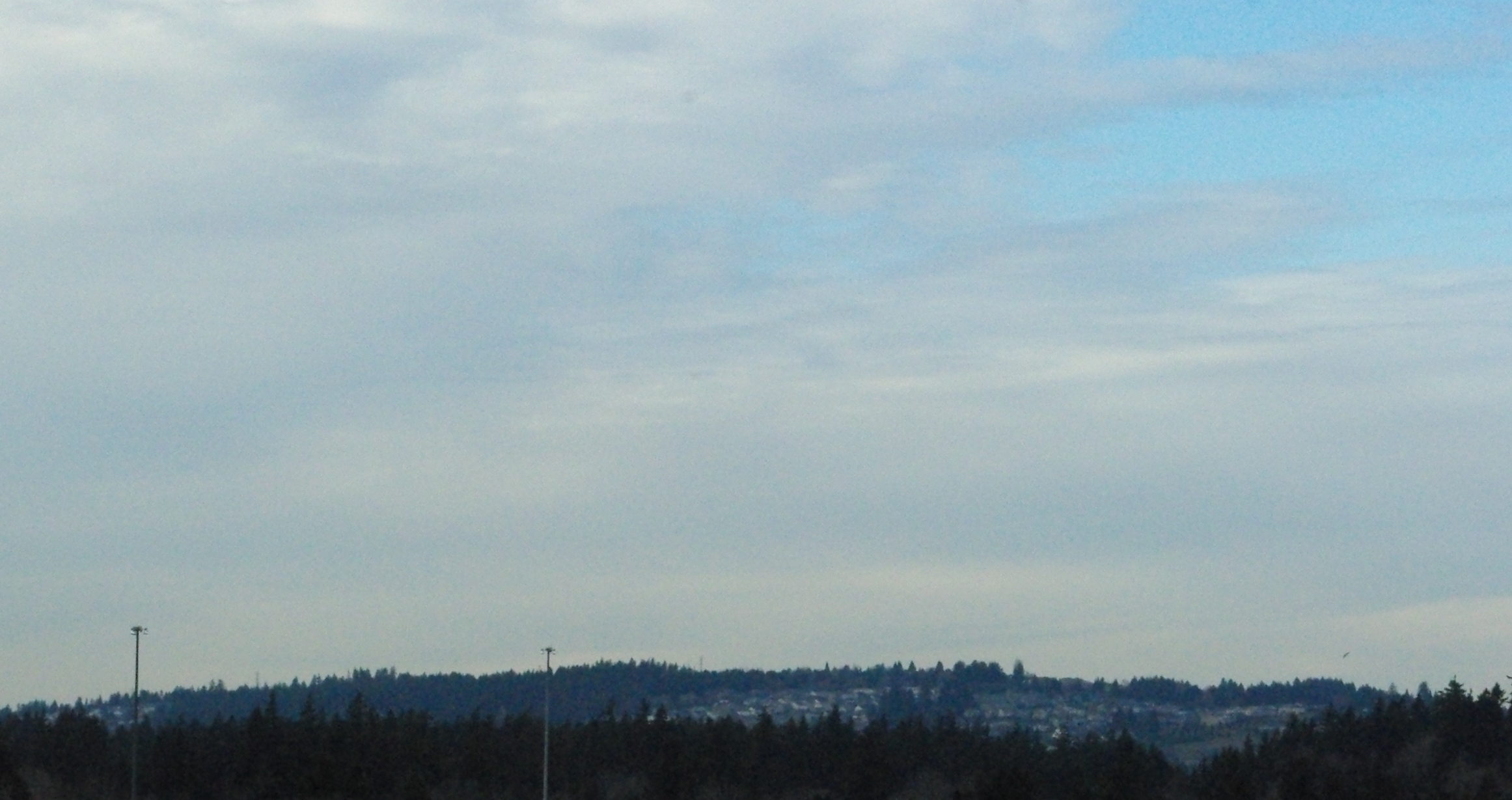
- Top of Bull Mountain

- Location within the state of Oregon Bull Mountain, Oregon (the United States)
- Coordinates: 45°24′45″N 122°49′55″W
- Country: United States
- State: Oregon
- County: Washington

Area
  - Total: 1.98 sq mi (5.14 km^{2})
  - Land: 1.98 sq mi (5.14 km^{2})
  - Water: 0 sq mi (0.00 km^{2})
- Elevation: 561 ft (171 m)

Population (2020)
  - Total: 9,992
  - Density: 5,035.6/sq mi (1,944.27/km^{2})
- Time zone: UTC-8 (Pacific (PST))
  - Summer (DST): UTC-7 (PDT)
- ZIP codes: 97223, 97224
- Area code: 503
- FIPS code: 41-09535
- GNIS feature ID: 2584409

Bull Mountain // is an unincorporated community and census-designated place in Washington County, Oregon, United States. Bull Mountain is located mostly on a hill for which the community is named. It is bordered on the east by Tigard, on the south by King City, and Beaverton lies to the north. The northeastern part of the Bull Mountain hill is now within the Tigard city limits, as the city has steadily annexed portions of the unincorporated region on its boundary. In 2010, the community became a census-designated place. As of the 2020 census, Bull Mountain had a population of 9,992. Fire protection and EMS services are provided through Tualatin Valley Fire and Rescue.

== Demographics ==
As of the census of 2020, there were 9,992 people in 3,259 households residing in the city. The population density was 5,016.1 inhabitants per square mile (1,936.7/km^{2}). The racial makeup of the city was 81.4% White, 4.0% African American, 0.8% Native American, 8.4% Asian, 0.9% Pacific Islander, and 3.6% from two or more races. Hispanic or Latino of any race were 5.57% of the population.

There were 3,259 households. The average household size was 2.93.

25.2% of residents were under the age of 18, and 11.8% were 65 years of age or older. The gender makeup of the city was 49% male and 51% female.

Historical population
Census	Pop.	Note	%±
2020	9,992		—
U.S. Decennial Census

== Annexation and incorporation controversy ==
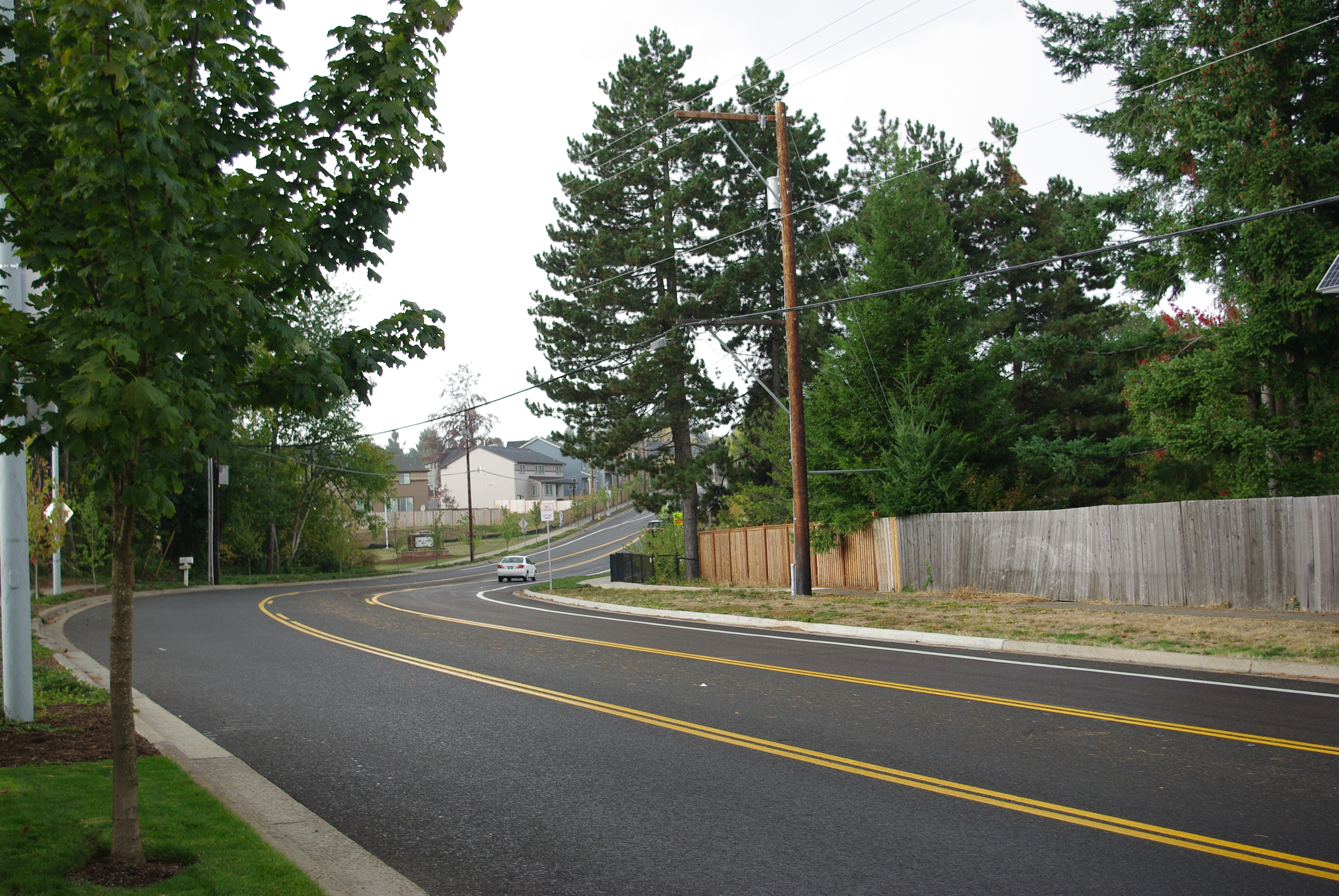
Bull Mountain Road

The Bull Mountain area has been considered a candidate for annexation by the City of Tigard, which includes Bull Mountain in its ultimate planned boundary. The debate over Bull Mountain's future has been rather acrimonious.

In 2004, Tigard proposed to annex the entire area under Oregon Revised Statutes (ORS) § 195.205 (2005) (Urban Service Provider Annexation method) instead of ORS § 222.125 (2005) method. At the time, ORS. § 195.205 was ambiguous regarding the method of counting votes, and Tigard had planned to use a single combined voting method where the unincorporated votes would be counted with the votes of the city voters, and thus the unincorporated voters would be heavily outnumbered. This variation of gerrymandering outraged many of the residents of the unincorporated area, and triggered a campaign against the annexation. A group called "Friends of Bull Mountain" (FOBM) was then formed. The group retained legal counsel Larry Derr and challenged the combined voting method under the provisions of ORS § 268 (2005) requiring separate double majority vote counting for annexations within the Portland Metro Urban Growth Boundary.

In the face of this legal challenge Tigard relented and allowed the double majority vote counting method. As a result, the annexation measure [34-98] failed, a majority of city voters (64.71%) favored the annexation, but 88.62% of unincorporated voters rejected the annexation.

As is common in such annexation disputes, a key issue was taxes; many Bull Mountain residents thought that annexation with Tigard would increase their property taxes without a significant increase in public services, and that Tigard was only interested in annexation to expand its tax base. They also felt the ORS 195 combined voting method was "taxation without representation". Some residents of Tigard have complained in response that Bull Mountain residents use Tigard city parks and other services without paying for them.

However, Washington County has been actively encouraging suburban parts of the county to join cities, in order to limit the need for county-provided urban-level services. After the defeat of the referendum, Tigard has been examining small annexations on a case-by-case basis.

Many residents advocated incorporation in order to allow Bull Mountain residents to control their own destiny (and avoid further annexation by Tigard), in spring of 2006 a petition for a ballot measure was filed.

The Washington County Board of Commissioners voted in August 2006 to allow the incorporation ballot initiative to proceed. A feasibility study was conducted by ECONorthwest and it was determined that Bull Mountain has a sufficient tax base to fund city government and services for its residents. The City of Tigard protested the city boundaries, noting that Tigard-owned properties were included in the proposed City of Bull Mountain, and asked that Washington County adjust the boundaries. That request was denied. Tigard also filed a request to annex 61.5 acres (249,000 m^{2}) which are part of the proposed Bull Mountain boundaries. Many in Bull Mountain complained that Tigard's annexation attempt is little more than an 11th-hour attempt to acquire a large segment of land without due respect for the incorporation process and proposed incorporation boundary. The effort was challenged legally in the Washington County courts. This legal challenge was rejected by the state Land Use Board of Appeals: "the city had not unlawfully obtained consent to the annexation," and the petition for appeal was dismissed by the Oregon Court of Appeals.

The referendum on the incorporation question was on the November 2006 ballot and failed by a vote of 1,734 to 1,887.

== Education ==
The majority is in the Tigard-Tualatin School District 23J. A northern portion is in the Beaverton School District 48J.

== Friends of Bull Mountain ==
The Friends of Bull Mountain (FOBM) is a grassroots community organization in the U.S. state of Oregon acting as local advocates for meaningful citizen involvement and responsible land use planning in keeping with the vision of the Bull Mountain Community Plan. The FOBM group played a key role in defeating the attempt by city of Tigard to annex Bull Mountain.

After the 2004 annexation defeat, FOBM worked closely with Oregon House Representative Jerry Krummel who successfully introduced legislation based on ideas and testimony provided by FOBM. Notable changes in the 2005 legislature included House Bill 2484 which codified double-majority vote for all "Service Provider" annexations under ORS 195. Also, HB 2477 eliminated the three-mile (5 km) veto which allowed cities to prevent incorporation of a new city within three miles (5 km). The enactment of HB 2477 allowed the Bull Mountain community to attempt incorporation.
