= Matt Wingard =

American politician

Member of the Oregon House of Representatives from the 26th district
- In office August 19, 2008 – 2013
- Preceded by: Jerry Krummel
- Succeeded by: John Davis

Personal details
- Born: Black River Falls, WI
- Party: Republican
- Education: University of Southern California, University of Minnesota College and Design

Matt Wingard is an American politician in the state of Oregon. He was appointed to fill a vacancy in the Oregon House of Representatives in 2008, and was elected to the seat in 2008 and re-elected in 2010. He represented District 26, which encompasses southeastern Washington County, including Sherwood; and southwestern Clackamas County, including Wilsonville. He did not seek re-election to a third term.

== Early life ==
Wingard received a BA in Broadcast Journalism at the University of Southern California. He began his career as a television reporter in Yakima, Washington, for KIMA-TV. He then served as a campaign manager and congressional aide to Congressman Doc Hastings who represents Central Washington State. In 2001, Wingard returned to Oregon and worked as legislative administrator at the Oregon State Capitol before starting his own consulting company in 2002. Wingard is the spokesman for the Oregon Connections Academy, an online charter school, that had an enrollment of 1,500 students as of 2007. He has been a vocal supporter of school choice.

== Political career ==
Wingard was appointed by Washington and Clackamas county commissioners to fill a vacancy in the Oregon House following the resignation of Jerry Krummel in August 2008, and announced his plans to seek election to a full term. During the campaign, it was revealed he was convicted in 2001 for misdemeanor assault for hitting his son on the head with a screwdriver. Wingard did community service and the conviction was eventually expunged. He won the November general election with 50% of the vote, defeating Democrat Jessica Adamson (45%) and Libertarian Marc Delphine (5%). In 2010, Wingard won reelection with 61% of the vote, defeating Democrat Sandy Webb (39%).

During his two terms, Wingard's accomplishments include authoring HB2476, which toughens sentences against athletic coaches who sexually abuse their young athletes. The bill was signed into law on August 4, 2009. Wingard authored HB2512, which directs the Department of Transportation to issue Fallen Public Safety Officer registration plates. Wingard introduced House Bill 2754 to provide tax-credit scholarships to low- and middle-income children throughout Oregon. It failed to pass a key legislative deadline in mid-April. Wingard also co-sponsored HB3471 with Democrat Rep. Michael Dembrow (NE Portland) to provide free college tuition to Oregon foster children.

Wingard has been a longtime supporter of school choice and was the chief architect of the GOP education bills included in the Legislature's 2011 education reform package that passed over the objections of the state's teachers union. Wingard called the package, which included bills increasing access to online education and expanding their charter schools, "the most consequential legislation on education reform in Oregon history." After the reform bills passed, a Democratic lobbyist claimed Wingard had "outwitted his Democratic co-chair every step of the way."

Wingard is a believer in "individual responsibility, limited government, constitutional democracy, property rights, and the free market."

In February 2010, Wingard ignited a minor controversy when he extensively quoted an article during a speech on the floor of the Oregon House. Some claimed it was plagiarism, but Wingard says he didn't have time to cite his source.

== Leadership Resignation ==
In early June 2012, Wingard resigned from his post as the Deputy Republican Leader of the Oregon House of Representatives following allegations that he pressured a young woman who worked in his office at the capitol into a sexual relationship. Then Republican House leader Kevin Cameron, told Wingard he would make a public call for his resignation if necessary.

Wingard admitted to the Willamette Week that the two did have a sexual relationship, but denied using his position to pressure her and claimed that "a small group of socially conservative and well-connected Republicans, including one local party official, had been deeply involved in encouraging that staffer to make claims against me and had also spent the last two years digging around in my private life looking for more mud to sling."

After Wingard abandoned his re-election campaign, his accuser recanted her most serious claims and he remained in office until the end of his term. His accuser went on to say, "While he and I have an obvious disagreement about the nature of our relationship, I appreciate Mr. Wingard's tireless support for education reform in Oregon."

Wingard's alleged wrongdoing, and his ensuing interactions with Cameron, became the subject of international press coverage amid speculation about a visit by several Republican lawmakers to a topless bar in California. Steve Duin of the Oregonian wrote, "Wingard actually fondled the sweet young things that House leadership is seemingly content to ogle. As The Oregonian's Michelle Cole reported Thursday, Wingard is one of seven House Republicans who topped off a three-day golf holiday in Palm Springs last January by checking out the topless dancers at a local bar. That midnight ramble might never have gone public had not Wingard's sexual relationship with Samantha Berrier, a 20-year-old staffer, come to light. While Wingard disagreed with Berrier's insistence that he pressured her into his bed, he eventually realized he was unelectable for a millennium or two and announced in June he would not seek re-election."

== Personal ==
He has served on the Clackamas County Economic Development Commission and the Portfolio Options Committee of the Oregon Public Utility Commission.

== Electoral history ==
2008 Oregon State Representative, 26th district
Party	Candidate	Votes	%
Republican	Matt Wingard	15,432	50.3
Democratic	Jessica Adamson	13,684	44.6
Libertarian	Marc Delphine	1,503	4.9
Write-in		89	0.3
Total votes		30,708	100%

2010 Oregon State Representative, 26th district
Party	Candidate	Votes	%
Republican	Matt Wingard	16,362	61.1
Democratic	Sandy Webb	10,382	38.7
Write-in		52	0.2
Total votes		26,796	100%

== See also ==
- Seventy-fourth Oregon Legislative Assembly (2007–2008)
