= Rich Vial =

American politician

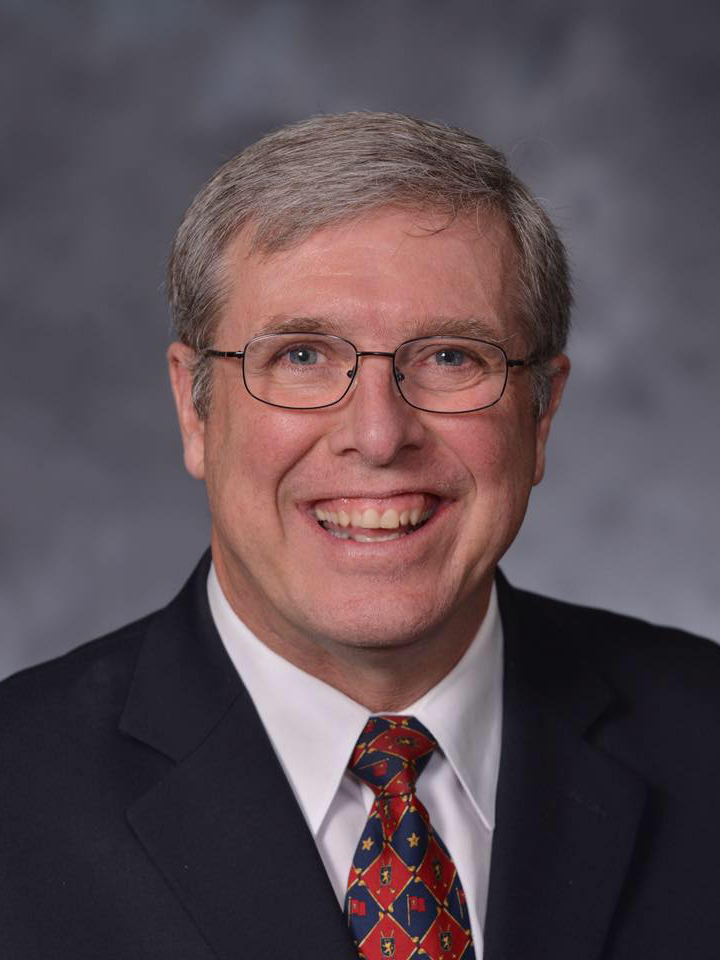

Member of the Oregon House of Representatives from the 26th district
- In office January 9, 2017 – January 14, 2019
- Preceded by: John Davis
- Succeeded by: Courtney Neron Misslin

Oregon Deputy Secretary of State
- In office April 2019 – January 2020

Personal details
- Born: September 28, 1954 (age 72) Lynwood, California, U.S.
- Party: Nonpartisan
- Other political affiliations: Non-affiliated
- Education: Brigham Young University; Willamette University College of Law
- Occupation: Small business owner, farmer, attorney

Armand Richard Vial (born September 28, 1954) is an American lawyer, farmer, small business owner, and Nonpartisan candidate for Oregon's State Senate District 18, which covers parts of Washington County, in the November 2022 midterm election. He previously served in the Oregon House of Representatives in 2016 representing the 26th district. He has served in the state legislature as a Republican.

== Biography ==
Vial was born in Lynwood, California. He attended Brigham Young University, from where he graduated in 1978, and the Willamette University College of Law. He has served on the Washington County Land Use Advisory Committee, and the Clean Water Services Advisory Committee.

He ran for the state House as a Republican in 2016. During his campaign, a complaint filed by Kathleen Stuart, the director of a state Democratic Party organization, alleged that Vial did not reside in the district he was campaigning to represent. The case was resolved in Vial's favor. He defeated Democratic candidate Ray Lister in the general election.

Vial is the former Chair of the Washington County Planning Commission and has previously served as Chair of the Groner School District Board and the Washington County Fair Board.

Vial was defeated in 2018 by Courtney Neron, a Democrat. After leaving the state legislature, Vial served as the Oregon Deputy Secretary of State under Bev Clarno from April 2019 to January 2020.

In 2020, Vial changed his political affiliation to Nonpartisan. In 2020, he announced his candidacy for Secretary of State, organizing a nominating convention to be held on July 25, but did not receive the signatures necessary to qualify.

In August 2022, Vial qualified to run as the non-affiliated candidate for the Oregon State Senate District 18 in the November 8, 2022 General Election.

== Personal life ==
Vial and his wife, Paula, who have been married since 1975, have 13 children, including 7 Vietnamese refugee children, and 46 grandchildren.

Vial and his family are members of the Church of Jesus Christ of Latter-day Saints and Vial has previously served as a Mormon Bishop.

== Electoral history ==
2016 Oregon State Representative, 26th district
Party	Candidate	Votes	%
Republican	Richard Vial	18,704	54.8
Democratic	Ray M Lister	15,365	45.0
Write-in		47	0.1
Total votes		34,116	100%

2018 Oregon State Representative, 26th district
Party	Candidate	Votes	%
Democratic	Courtney Neron	17,211	50.8
Republican	Rich Vial	15,928	47.0
Libertarian	Tim E Nelson	683	2.0
Write-in		46	0.1
Total votes		33,868	100%

2022 Oregon State Senator, 18th district (2 year term)
Party	Candidate	Votes	%
Democratic	Wlnsvey Campos	30,534	56.5
Republican	Kimberly Rice	17,848	33.0
Independent	Rich Vial	5,599	10.4
Write-in		59	0.1
Total votes		54,040	100%
