= Creekside Community High School =

Location
- 8040 SW Durham Road; Tigard, (Washington County), Oregon 97224; United States; 45°24′14″N 122°45′36″W

Information
- Type: Public
- Opened: 2019
- School district: Tigard-Tualatin School District
- Principal: Russ Romas
- Teaching staff: 16.00 (on an FTE basis)
- Grades: 9-12
- Enrollment: 167 students
- Student to teacher ratio: 10.44
- Website: Creekside Community High School

Creekside Community High School is a public high school located in Tigard, Oregon, United States. Formerly the Durham Education Center, the alternative high school accepts students in grades 9–12, while also a part of the Tigard-Tualatin School District. The school formally opened for the 2019–2020 school year. As outlined by the Hands-on Learning PDF, Creekside Community aims to "lead the way towards a future of holistic community health."

Creekside Community offers a paid internship with the SupaFresh Youth Farm The farm employs up to 50 youth per year in paid internships that include Work Readiness Training, Leadership Development and Support Services. The hands-on, student-centered approach to learning at the farm empowers and supports youth to learn by doing.

== History ==
The Durham Education Center, now Creekside Community High School, takes its roots to the Durham School established in 1920.

The historic 1920 schoolhouse comes as a rebuild from its original model constructed in 1889 which, as described by early alumnus Fred Olson, contained four components: the main single room building, woodshed, "and two 4’x4’ smaller structures at opposite corners of the yard."

== Demographics ==
The demographic breakdown of the students enrolled in 2024-25 was:

- Native American/Alaskan Native - 0.0%
- Asian - 0.0%
- Black - 1%
- Hispanic - 37%
- Native Hawaiian/Pacific Islander - 1%
- White - 50%
- Multiracial - 11%

The demographic breakdown of the 15 teachers working at the school in 2024-25 was:

- Native American/Alaskan Native - 0.0%
- Asian - 14%
- Black - 0.0%
- Hispanic - 24%
- Native Hawaiian/Pacific Islander - 0.0%
- White - 57%
- Multiracial - 5%
