= Metzger, Oregon =

Place in Oregon, United States

- Census-designated place (CDP) & unincorporated community
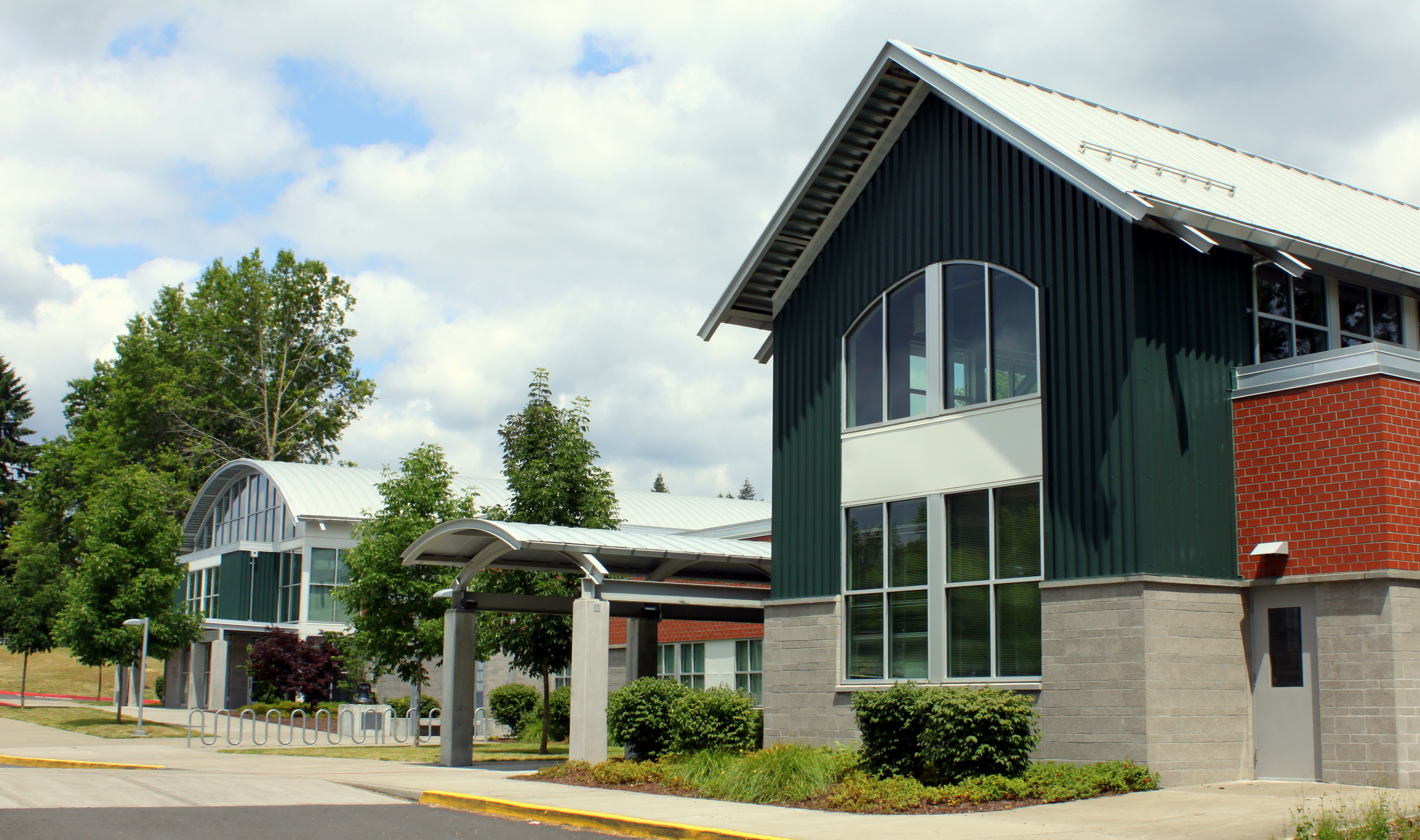
- Metzger Elementary School

- Location of Metzger, Oregon
- Coordinates: 45°26′58″N 122°45′43″W
- Country: United States
- State: Oregon
- County: Washington

Area
  - Total: 0.76 sq mi (1.97 km^{2})
  - Land: 0.76 sq mi (1.97 km^{2})
  - Water: 0 sq mi (0.00 km^{2})
- Elevation: 203 ft (62 m)

Population (2020)
  - Total: 4,272
  - Density: 5,621.5/sq mi (2,170.47/km^{2})
- Time zone: UTC-8 (Pacific (PST))
  - Summer (DST): UTC-7 (PDT)
- ZIP code: 97223
- Area codes: 503 and 971
- FIPS code: 41-47800
- GNIS feature ID: 2408826

Metzger is a census-designated place and unincorporated community, in Washington County, Oregon, United States. As of the 2020 census, the CDP population was 4,272. It is named for Herman Metzger, who platted the community. It is a suburb located within Portland, Oregon.

== History ==
Herman Metzger platted the community, which was actively marketed from 1908–1909. The main line of the Oregon Electric Railway passed through the community, and had a stop that was located off Locust Street east of Jefferson.

== Geography ==
According to the United States Census Bureau, the CDP has a total area of 0.7 square miles (1.8 km^{2}), all land.

Washington Square, a major shopping mall, lies immediately west of Metzger. Ash Creek flows east to west through Metzger, fed by an unnamed creek that joins at Metzger Park.

== Demographics ==
Historical population
Census	Pop.	Note	%±
2020	4,272		—
U.S. Decennial Census

=== 2020 census ===
As of the 2020 census, Metzger had a population of 4,272.

The median age was 41.1 years. 18.8% of residents were under the age of 18 and 19.5% of residents were 65 years of age or older. For every 100 females there were 93.7 males, and for every 100 females age 18 and over there were 91.0 males age 18 and over.

100.0% of residents lived in urban areas, while 0.0% lived in rural areas.

There were 1,774 households in Metzger, of which 25.8% had children under the age of 18 living in them. Of all households, 43.6% were married-couple households, 20.6% were households with a male householder and no spouse or partner present, and 27.0% were households with a female householder and no spouse or partner present. About 30.4% of all households were made up of individuals and 12.9% had someone living alone who was 65 years of age or older.

There were 1,852 housing units, of which 4.2% were vacant. The homeowner vacancy rate was 0.7% and the rental vacancy rate was 3.3%.

Racial composition as of the 2020 census
Race	Number	Percent
White	3,161	74.0%
Black or African American	105	2.5%
American Indian and Alaska Native	55	1.3%
Asian	177	4.1%
Native Hawaiian and Other Pacific Islander	53	1.2%
Some other race	276	6.5%
Two or more races	445	10.4%
Hispanic or Latino (of any race)	588	13.8%

=== 2010 census ===
As of the 2010 census, there were 3,765 people, 1,631 households, and 928 families residing in the CDP. The population density was 5,118.5 inhabitants per square mile (1,976.3/km^{2}). There were 1,735 housing units at an average density of 2,853.7 per square mile (1,101.8/km^{2}). The racial makeup of the CDP was 80.1% White, 3.1% Asian, 2.8% African American, 0.8% Native American, 2.1% Pacific Islander, 6.6% from other races, and 4.4% from two or more races. Hispanic or Latino of any race were 13.7% of the population.

There were 1,631 households, out of which 26.9% had children under the age of 18 living with them, 40.5% were married couples living together, 11.2% had a female householder with no husband present, and 43.1% were non-families. 33.1% of all households were made up of individuals, and 10.2% had someone living alone who was 65 years of age or older. The average household size was 2.31 and the average family size was 2.95.

In the CDP, the population was spread out, with 22.6% under the age of 18, 8.0% from 18 to 24, 2.4% from 25 to 44, 26.5% from 45 to 64, and 10.5% who were 65 years of age or older. The median age was 35.9 years. For every 100 females, there were 98.5 males. For every 100 females age 18 and over, there were 94.0 males.

=== Income and poverty ===
The median income for a household in the CDP in 2017 was $52,852, and the median income for a family was $63,750. Males had a median income of $52,000 versus $39,940 for females. The per capita income for the CDP was $34,905. About 13.1% of families and 13.2% of the population were below the poverty line, including 12.3% of those under age 18 and 15.5% of those age 65 or over.

== Education ==
The vast majority is in the Tigard-Tualatin School District 23J. A small part to the north is in the Beaverton School District 48J.

== See also ==
- Tualatin Valley Fire and Rescue
