= John Davis (Oregon politician) =

American politician

Member of the Oregon House of Representatives from the 26th district
- In office January 14, 2013 – January 9, 2017
- Preceded by: Matt Wingard
- Succeeded by: Rich Vial

Personal details
- Party: Republican
- Education: University of Oxford; George Fox University; Willamette University College of Law
- Website: johndavisfororegon.com

John Davis is an American politician and a Republican member of the Oregon House of Representatives representing District 26 from 2013 until 2017.

== Education ==
Davis attended the University of Oxford, earned his BA from George Fox University, and his JD from Willamette University College of Law.

== Elections ==
- 2012 Incumbent Republican Representative Matt Wingard was unopposed for the District 26 seat in the May 15, 2012 Republican Primary, winning with 3,067 votes, but withdrew before the general election; Davis won the July 9 special election by precinct committee persons to replace him, and won the November 6, 2012 General election with 15,141 votes (55.5%) against Democratic nominee Wynne Wakkila.

== Legislation ==
In February 2015, Davis introduced a bill to mandate reflective clothing for bicycle riders, but revised the bill in March to address bicycle lighting rather than clothing.

== Electoral history ==
2012 Oregon State Representative, 26th district
Party	Candidate	Votes	%
Republican	John Davis	15,141	55.5
Democratic	Wynne Wakkila	12,096	44.3
Write-in		60	0.2
Total votes		27,297	100%

2014 Oregon State Representative, 26th district
Party	Candidate	Votes	%
Republican	John Davis	13,546	57.8
Democratic	Eric D Squires	8,811	37.6
Libertarian	Chuck Huntting	982	4.2
Write-in		77	0.3
Total votes		23,416	100%
