= Tigard High School =

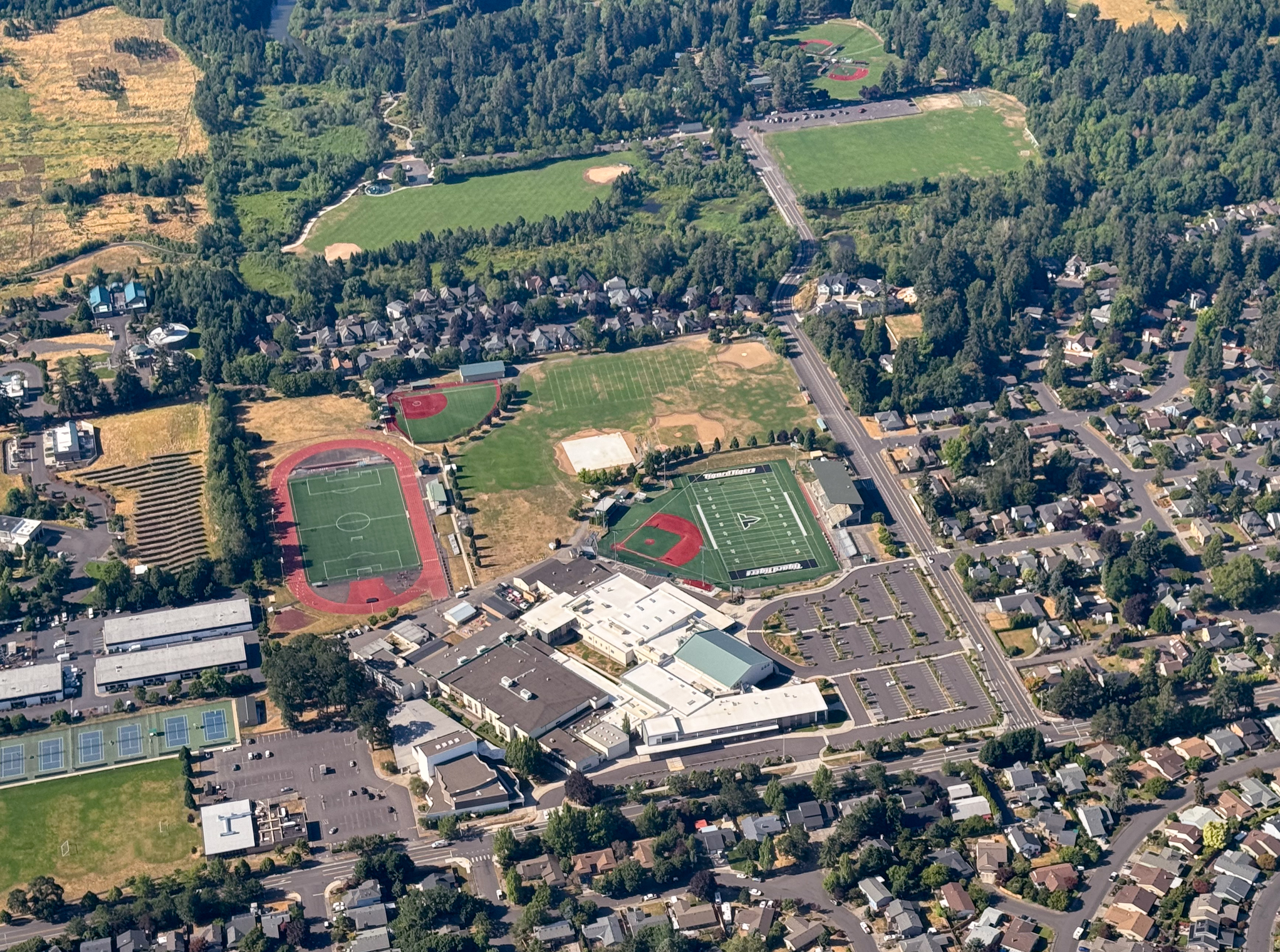

Location
- 9000 SW Durham Road; Tigard, Oregon 97224; United States; 45°24′12″N 122°46′03″W

Information
- Type: Public
- Opened: 1927
- School district: Tigard-Tualatin School District
- Principal: Melissa Baran
- Teaching staff: 84.61 (on an FTE basis)
- Grades: 9-12
- Enrollment: 1,771 (2024-2025)
- Student to teacher ratio: 20.93
- Colors: Green, black, and white
- Athletics conference: OSAA Three-Rivers League 6A-5
- Nickname: Tigers
- Rival: Tualatin High School
- Newspaper: The Paw
- Yearbook: The Tiger
- Feeder schools: Fowler Middle School and Twality Middle School
- Website: ths.ttsdschools.org

Tigard High School (THS) is a public high school located in Tigard, Oregon, United States. It is one of two high schools in the Tigard-Tualatin School District and educates students in grades 9–12.

== History ==
Tigard High School originally was in a different location from recent times. The school first opened in 1927. It occupied the site of the first Tigard school which occupied a log building from 1853 near downtown Tigard.

The current Tigard High School building opened in 1953.

The school was remodeled in 2004, mostly on the east side of the school.

In November 2016, voters approved Measure 34-248, which provided $291,315,000 for the school district. $62 million of that funding went to build new Tigard High buildings and repair existing ones. A new second-story wing has been added and the commons expanded. After completion, the commons will be the only place to eat lunch. Currently, students who qualify for free or reduced lunch eat in one building and other students in the commons. District spokeswoman Susan Stark Haydon was quoted as saying "expanding that area (commons) will eliminate that equity challenge". The school rebuilt the locker rooms for equality while also adding a new weight room as part of the upgrade. Through construction, the schools' office was moved to the new structure facing Southwest Durham Road. The school also updated security by changing entrances to make them safer.

== Academics ==
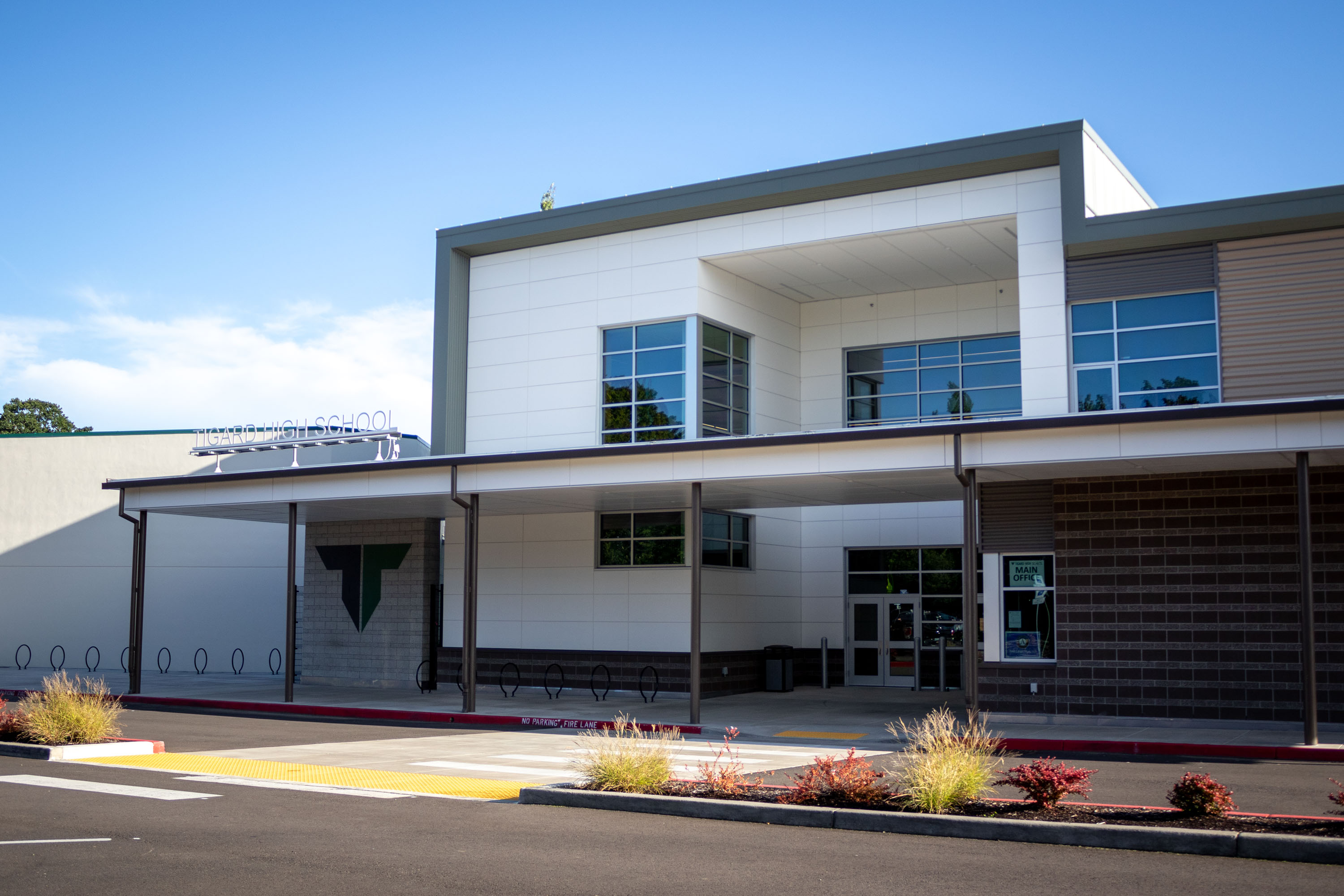
School entrance

Tigard High School has offered the International Baccalaureate curriculum since January 1987.

== Demographics ==
The demographic breakdown of the 1,752 students enrolled in 2021-22 was:

- Male - 53.2%
- Female - 46.8%
- Native American/Alaskan Native - 0.6%
- Asian - 5.0%
- Black - 2.1%
- Hispanic - 26.9%
- Native Hawaiian/Pacific Islander - 1.8%
- White - 54.1%
- Multiracial - 8.6%

16.7% of the students were free lunch eligible.

== Notable alumni ==
- Steve Cooke, baseball player
- Katherine Dunn, author
- Nick Duron, former MLB pitcher
- Gary Hansen, politician
- Nathaniel Hansen, film producer
- Nico Harrison, former pro basketball player and former Dallas Mavericks general manager.
- Mike Kinkade, baseball player
- Lori L. Lake, author
- Kaitlin Olson, actress
- Dan Rayfield, politician
- Craig Rosebraugh, writer
