= Tualatin High School =

Public school in Tualatin, Oregon, United States

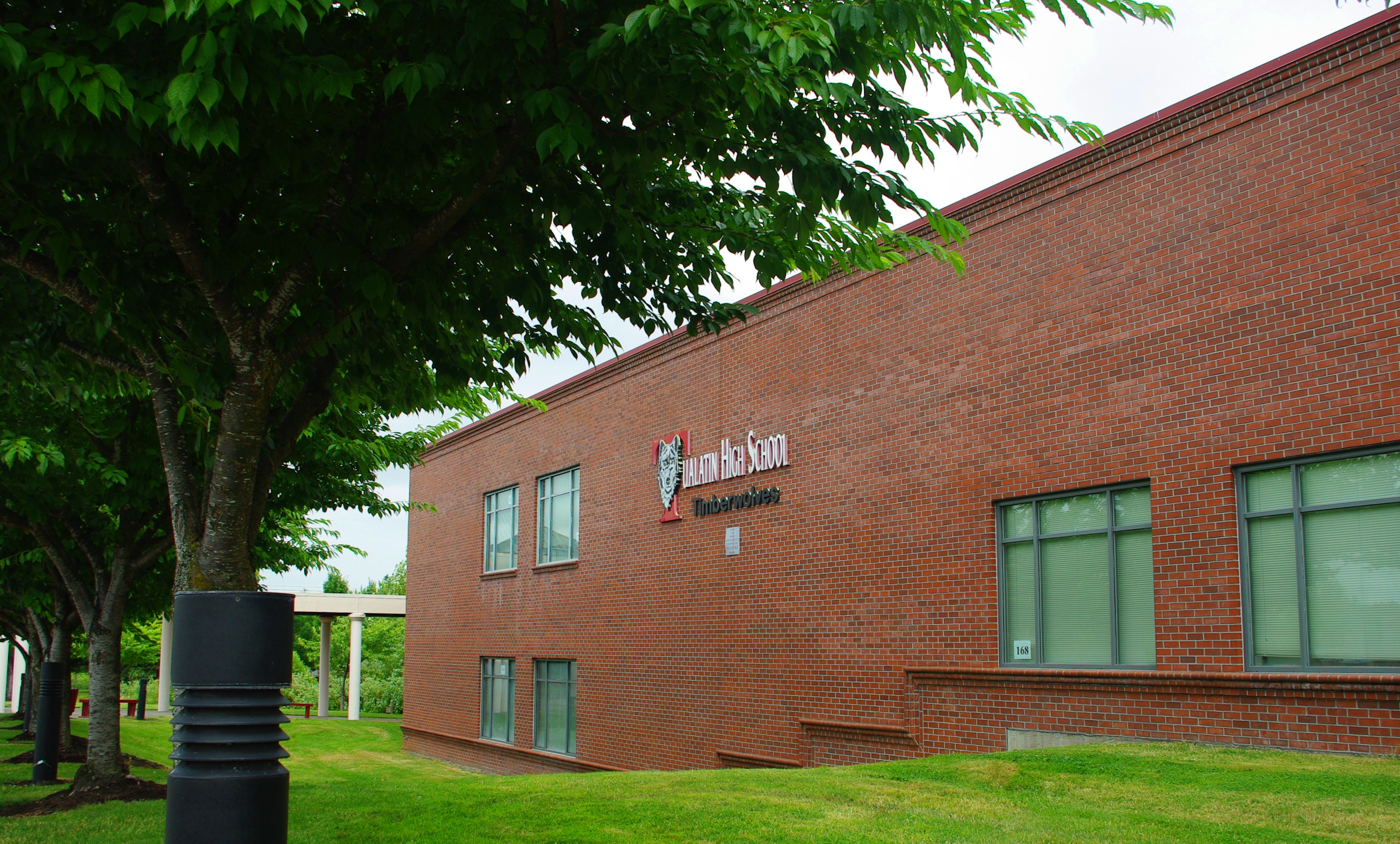

Location
- 22300 SW Boones Ferry Road; Tualatin, (Washington County), Oregon 97062; United States; 45°21′30″N 122°46′14″W

Information
- Type: Public
- Opened: 1992
- School district: Tigard-Tualatin School District
- Principal: Michael Dellerba
- Teaching staff: 98.26 (on an FTE basis)
- Grades: 9-12
- Enrollment: 1,747 (2022-2023)
- Student to teacher ratio: 17.78
- Colors: Crimson, black, and silver
- Athletics conference: OSAA Three Rivers League 6A-5
- Mascot: Timberwolf
- Team name: Timberwolves
- Rival: Tigard High School
- Newspaper: The Wolf
- Feeder schools: Hazelbrook Middle School; Twality Middle School
- Website: Tualatin High School

Tualatin High School (TuHS) is a public high school located in Tualatin, Oregon, United States. Students in grades 9 through 12 attend the school, which is part of the Tigard-Tualatin School District.

== History ==
Tualatin High School's roots reach back to 1865 when a small red schoolhouse was built in the village. The schoolhouse went on to become Tualatin Elementary School and is now the location of the Tualatin Food Bank. It was replaced in 1900 with a new, two-room school on Boones Ferry Road, which is still a major thoroughfare in the city. A four-year high school program was offered for the first time in 1909 after the school was hoisted up and two more rooms were added beneath. However, the seven-member class of 1936 was the last class to graduate from the old Tualatin School. After that, students were sent to nearby high schools in Sherwood and Tigard. The move was further solidified in 1969 when Tualatin residents voted to officially join Tigard School District 23J.

In 1990, following rapid growth in Tualatin, the name of the district changed to the Tigard-Tualatin School District, a signal of Tualatin's emerging importance in the area's academic structure. Two years later, in 1992, the new Tualatin High School opened on a 64-acre (260,000 m^{2}) campus. Students from area junior high schools voted on the school colors and mascot.

For several years, the school lacked a swimming pool and auditorium, as well as proper spectator stands for its state-of-the-art football field. As a result, many extracurricular activities, such as plays and sporting events, took place on the grounds of the school's rival, Tigard High School. This was corrected in summer 1998, when the school completed its new sports stadium. Later that year, it opened its own auditorium and swim center. Since then, the softball and baseball facilities and a multi-purpose field have been converted to turf.

The new T.E.C.H. Wing (Tualatin Engineering, Computers, and Health) opened in spring 2006. In the 2018–2019 school year, construction was in place all around the school to add a new main office, an addition to the T.E.C.H. Wing, extensions to the commons, new classrooms, and a new locker room for the boys and girls.

During the summer of 2003, school sequences of the 2005 independent film Thumbsucker (film) were filmed at the school.

== Academics ==
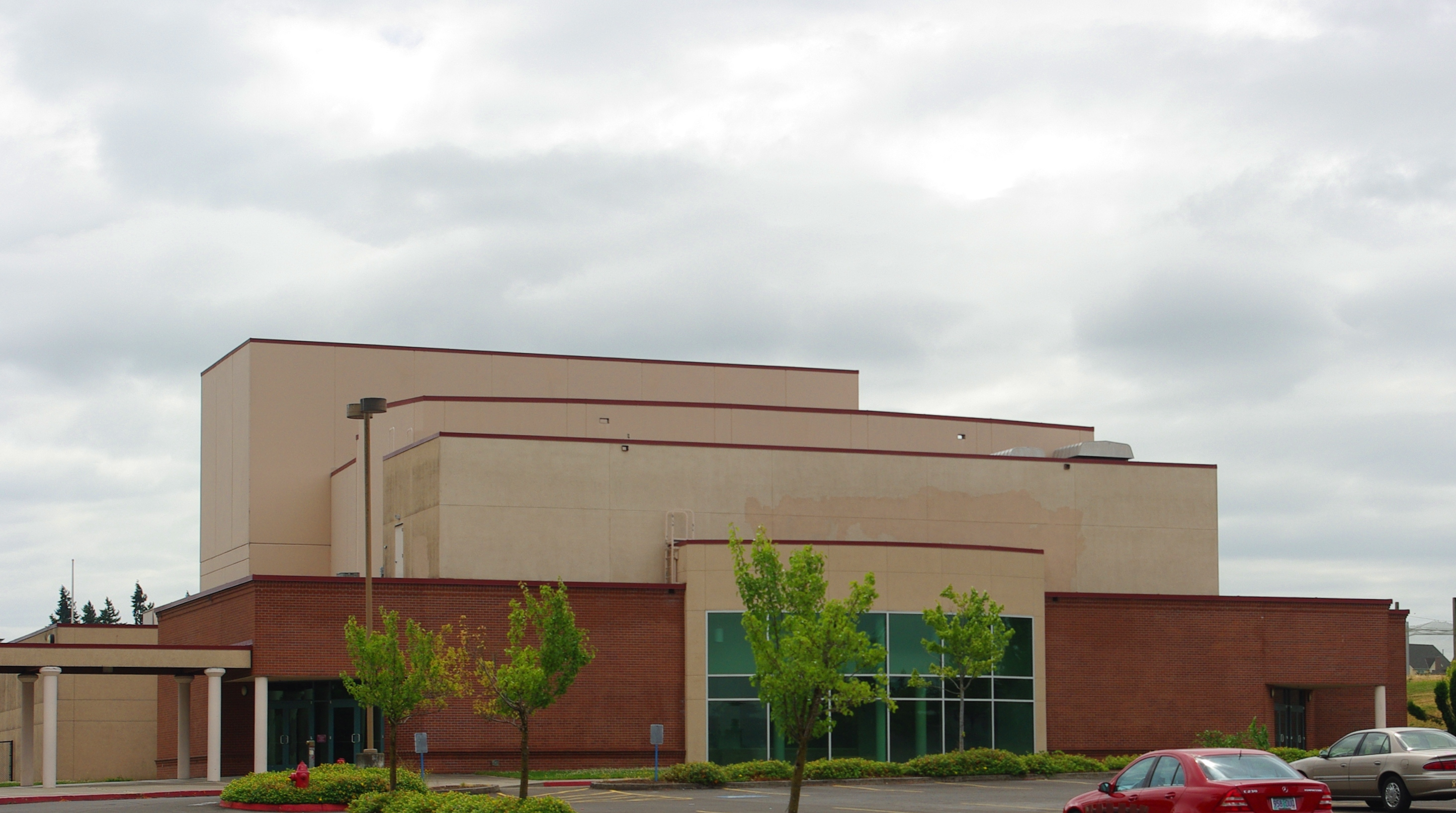
School auditorium

In 2008, 85% of the school's seniors received a high school diploma. Of 370 students, 314 graduated, 35 dropped out, five received a modified diploma, and 16 were still in high school the following year.

== Athletics ==
As of the 2025-2026 school year Tualatin has won 38 State championships with a majority of them coming from cheerleading (11), girls soccer (5), boys basketball (4) and girls water polo (4).

The cheerleading team has won 4 national titles to go along with their 11 state titles, including 3 national championships from 2023-2026.

=== State championships ===
- Boys' basketball: 2013, 2022, 2023, 2026 -(4 total)
- Girls' basketball: 2025 -(1 total)
- Boys' golf: 2002, 2003, 2004 -(3 total)
- Girls' soccer: 2005, 2006, 2011, 2013, 2014 -(5 total)
- Cheerleading: 1994, 1998, 1999, 2003, 2006, 2011, 2012, 2018, 2020, 2025, 2026 -(11 total)
- Dance/drill: 2025 -(1 total)
- Girls' water polo: 2010, 2011, 2013, 2014 -(4 total)
- Girls' flag football: 2026 -(1 total)
- Girls' golf: 2012 -(1 total)
- Girls' softball: 2015, 2018 -(2 total)
- Boys' track and field: 2019 -(1 total)
- Girls' track and field: 2023 -(1 total)

=== Speech & Debate ===
- 1997: Won the state Cross-Examination Debate championship.
- 1998: Won the state Cross-Examination Debate championship.
- 2005: Won the state Cross-Examination Debate championship.

=== National champions ===
- Cheerleading: 1999, 2023, 2024, 2026

=== Theatre ===
- 2013: Rashomon was chosen for presentation at the State Thespian Conference.
- 2024: The Curious Incident of the Dog in the Night-time was chosen for presentation at the State Thespian Conference.

== Notable alumni ==
- Danah Al-Nasrallah, track and field athlete
- Ben Bowman, politician
- Ian Fuller, soccer player
- Bret Harrison, actor
- Taylor Hart, college football, University of Oregon
- Luke Staley, college football, Doak Walker Award winner, Brigham Young University
- Jarad vanSchaik, soccer player
- Courtney Verloo, soccer player
- Mariano Kis, track and field athlete
- John Miller, football player

== Demographics ==
The demographic breakdown of the 1,734 students enrolled in 2024-25 was:

=== Gender ===
- Male - 53%
- Female - 47%

=== Race ===
- Native American/Alaskan Native - 0.2%
- Asian - 6.7%
- Black - 1.8%
- Hispanic - 29.9%
- Native Hawaiian/Pacific Islander - 2.1%
- White - 50.3%
- Multiracial - 7.0%

=== Other ===
25% of the students were eligible for free or reduced price lunches.

There were 98 full-time equivalent teachers.
