= Jerry Krummel =

American politician

Member of the Oregon House of Representatives from the 26th district
- In office January 2001 – August 1, 2008
- Succeeded by: Matt Wingard

Personal details
- Born: Walla Walla, Washington
- Party: Republican
- Spouse: Gerri
- Education: University of Utah, Lewis & Clark College
- Occupation: Educator

Gerald A. "Jerry" Krummel is a Republican politician from the U.S. state of Oregon. A native of Washington, he served as mayor of Wilsonville, Oregon in the 1990s. An educator and athletic trainer, he is a former member of the Oregon House of Representatives, representing Wilsonville and parts of Washington and Clackamas counties.

== Early life ==
Gerald A. Krummel was born in Walla Walla, Washington, and later earned a degree at the University of Utah in Salt Lake City, Utah. He then graduated from Lewis & Clark College in Portland, Oregon with a masters in teaching degree. Following college he began working as a school athletic trainer, first for the Portland Public Schools and then at Lewis & Clark. Krummel then became the head of the training program at Western Oregon State College (now Western Oregon University) in Monmouth before starting his own athletic training business in 1990.

== Political career ==
In 1989, Krummel started his political career when he was appointed to a Wilsonville, Oregon, city committee. The following year he was elected to the city council followed by election as mayor, serving six years as mayor. In 1998, he was elected to the Oregon House of Representatives to District 27 representing parts of Clackamas and Washington counties.

Krummel won re-election in 2000, 2002, 2004, and 2006, but redistricting changed the constituency to District 26. He collaborated closely with a community group known as Friends of Bull Mountain who have advocated changes to Oregon land use laws. On August 4, 2007, Krummel announced that he would not seek re-election to the Oregon House of Representatives. He resigned his office on August 1, 2008, and moved to Reno, Nevada.
