= King City, Oregon =

- City
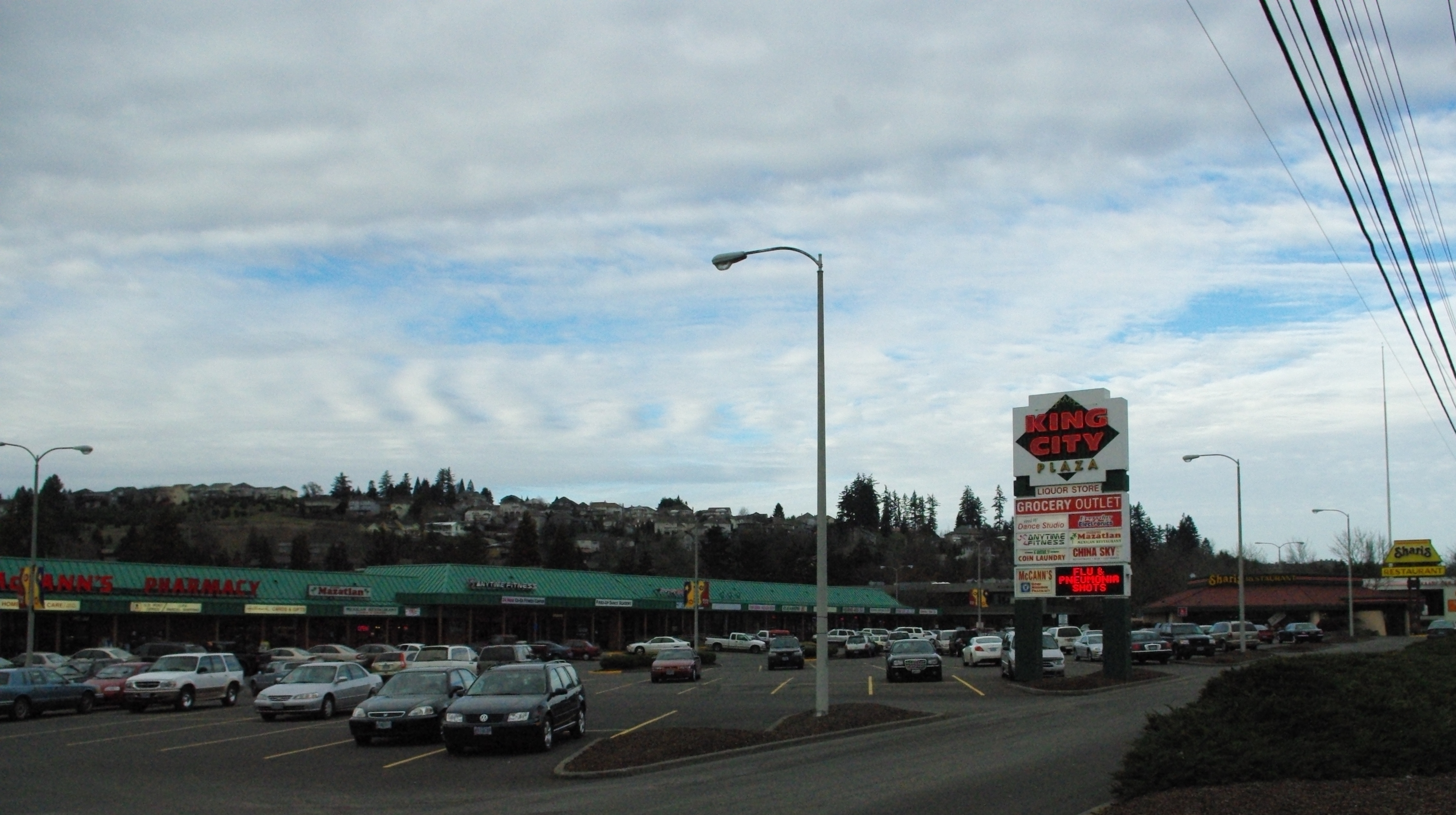
- Strip mall on 99W

- Location in Oregon

- Location in the United States
- Coordinates: 45°24′04″N 122°48′25″W
- Country: United States
- State: Oregon
- County: Washington
- Incorporated: 1966

Government
  - Mayor: Rachel Kazmierski

Area
  - Total: 0.81 sq mi (2.10 km^{2})
  - Land: 0.81 sq mi (2.10 km^{2})
  - Water: 0 sq mi (0.00 km^{2})
- Elevation: 180 ft (55 m)

Population (2020)
  - Total: 5,184
  - Density: 6,390.4/sq mi (2,467.36/km^{2})
- Time zone: UTC-8 (Pacific)
  - Summer (DST): UTC-7 (Pacific)
- ZIP code: 97224
- Area codes: 503 and 971
- FIPS code: 41-39150
- GNIS feature ID: 2411545
- Website: www.ci.king-city.or.us

King City is a city in Washington County, Oregon, United States. Its name was picked by the Tualatin Development Company, Inc., which used a royalty theme in naming the city streets. The population was 5,184 at the 2020 census. Fire protection and EMS services are provided through Tualatin Valley Fire and Rescue.

== History ==
The community was built by the Tualatin Development Company starting in 1964. Created as a planned community for adults, King City was incorporated in March 1966. Build-out of the original 273 acres (110 ha) finished about 1978. Originally, King City was developed as an age-restricted community governed by the rules of the King City Civic Association (KCCA) in which people under 50 could not live in the city.

The KCCA rules were later changed to conform to the 1988 amendments to the Federal Fair Housing Act, which set the age restriction to 55 or older. Later, the city, which was at first contiguous with the boundaries of KCCA, expanded to include newer, non-age restricted developments. Future expansion to the west is planned for the city, within the limits of the Portland Metropolitan Urban Growth Boundary. In 2024, the City Council passed an annexation on the far West side of the King City Urban Growth Boundary. This annexation was approved by 100% of land owners and increased the City land area by approximately 215 acres.

== Geography ==
According to the United States Census Bureau, the city has a total area of 0.72 square miles (1.86 km^{2}), all of it land.

== Demographics ==
Historical population
Census	Pop.	Note	%±
1970	1,427		—
1980	1,853		29.9%
1990	2,060		11.2%
2000	1,949		−5.4%
2010	3,111		59.6%
2020	5,184		66.6%
U.S. Decennial Census

=== 2020 census ===
As of the 2020 census, King City had a population of 5,184. The median age was 59.3 years, 14.9% of residents were under the age of 18, and 41.8% of residents were 65 years of age or older. For every 100 females there were 70.5 males, and for every 100 females age 18 and over there were 66.2 males age 18 and over. As of the 2020 census, 100.0% of residents lived in urban areas, while 0% lived in rural areas. As of the 2020 census, there were 2,628 households in King City, of which 17.0% had children under the age of 18 living in them. Of all households, 38.2% were married-couple households, 12.5% were households with a male householder and no spouse or partner present, and 45.1% were households with a female householder and no spouse or partner present. About 46.2% of all households were made up of individuals and 37.3% had someone living alone who was 65 years of age or older. As of the 2020 census, there were 2,734 housing units, of which 3.9% were vacant. Among occupied housing units, 77.9% were owner-occupied and 22.1% were renter-occupied. The homeowner vacancy rate was 1.1% and the rental vacancy rate was 2.2%.

Racial composition as of the 2020 census
Race	Number	Percent
White	3,997	77.1%
Black or African American	103	2.0%
American Indian and Alaska Native	21	0.4%
Asian	362	7.0%
Native Hawaiian and Other Pacific Islander	17	0.3%
Some other race	270	5.2%
Two or more races	414	8.0%
Hispanic or Latino (of any race)	615	11.9%

=== 2010 census ===
As of the census of 2010, there were 3,111 people, 1,735 households, and 729 families living in the city. The population density was 4,320.8 inhabitants per square mile (1,668.3/km^{2}). There were 1,920 housing units at an average density of 2,666.7 per square mile (1,029.6/km^{2}). The racial makeup of the city was 89.0% White, 1.8% African American, 0.4% Native American, 5.2% Asian, 0.3% Pacific Islander, 1.3% from other races, and 2.1% from two or more races. Hispanic or Latino of any race were 4.5% of the population.

There were 1,735 households, of which 12.0% had children under the age of 18 living with them, 34.2% were married couples living together, 6.2% had a female householder with no husband present, 1.6% had a male householder with no wife present, and 58.0% were non-families. 54.1% of all households were made up of individuals, and 43.7% had someone living alone who was 65 years of age or older. The average household size was 1.75 and the average family size was 2.63.

The median age in the city was 63.9 years. 13% of residents were under the age of 18; 2.3% were between the ages of 18 and 24; 15.4% were from 25 to 44; 21.4% were from 45 to 64; and 48% were 65 years of age or older. The gender makeup of the city was 38.2% male and 61.8% female.

=== 2000 census ===
At the 2000 census, there were 1,949 people, 1,389 households and 480 families living in the city. The population density was 4,652.9 inhabitants per square mile (1,796.5/km^{2}). There were 1,488 housing units at an average density of 3,552.4 per square mile (1,371.6/km^{2}). The racial makeup of the city was 98.31% White, 0.15% Native American, 0.92% Asian, 0.10% from other races, and 0.51% from two or more races. Hispanic or Latino of any race were 0.51% of the population.

There were 1,389 households, of which 0.6% had children under the age of 18 living with them, 31.4% were married couples living together, 2.9% had a female householder with no husband present, and 65.4% were non-families. 63.4% of all households were made up of individuals, and 55.2% had someone living alone who was 65 years of age or older. The average household size was 1.40 and the average family size was 2.09.

Age distribution was 0.9% under the age of 18, 0.5% from 18 to 24, 3.0% from 25 to 44, 16.7% from 45 to 64, and 78.9% who were 65 years of age or older. The median age was 76 years. For every 100 females, there were 50.2 males. For every 100 females age 18 and over, there were 49.8 males.

The median household income was $28,617, and the median family income was $49,444. Males had a median income of $39,917 versus $33,750 for females. The per capita income for the city was $27,536. None of the families and 2.4% of the population were living below the poverty line, including no persons under the age of 18 and 2.1% of those over 64.

== Education ==
It is in the Tigard-Tualatin School District 23J.
