= Aaron Woods (politician) =

American politician (1950–2025)

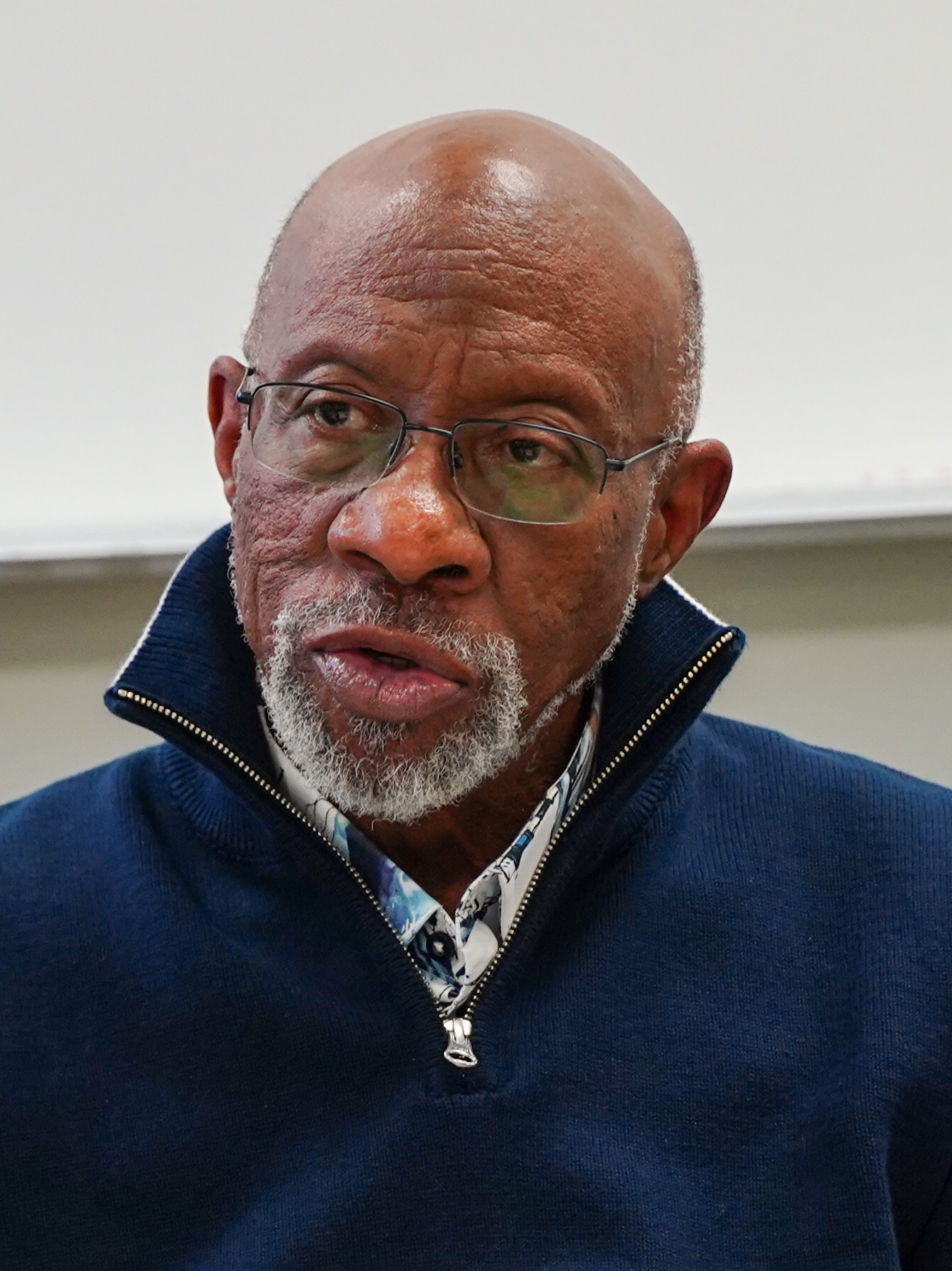
- Woods in 2024

Member of the Oregon Senate from the 13th district
- In office January 9, 2023 – April 18, 2025
- Preceded by: Kim Thatcher
- Succeeded by: Courtney Neron Misslin

Personal details
- Born: 1950
- Died: April 19, 2025 (aged 75) Colorado, U.S.
- Party: Democratic
- Education: Marylhurst University (BA, MBA)
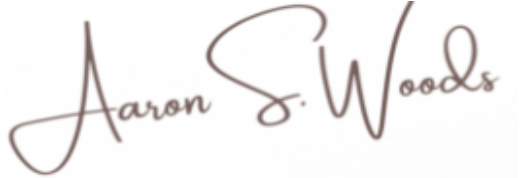
- Signature
- Website: https://aaronwoods4senate.com

Military service
- Branch/service: United States Army

Aaron L. Woods (1950 – April 19, 2025) was an American politician who served as a member of the Oregon State Senate for the 13th district from 2023 to 2025. Elected in November 2022, he assumed office on January 9, 2023.

== Early life and education ==
Woods was born in 1950, and raised in Chicago. He earned a Bachelor of Arts degree and Master of Business Administration from Marylhurst University.

== Career ==
Woods served in the United States Army. From 1996 to 1999, he worked as a senior manager at Tektronix. From 2000 to 2009, he worked in multiple positions at Xerox. Woods was elected to the Oregon State Senate in November 2022.

== Death ==
Woods died in Colorado on April 19, 2025, while receiving treatments for pancreatic cancer. He was 75.

== Electoral history ==
2022 Oregon State Senator, 13th district
Party	Candidate	Votes	%
Democratic	Aaron Woods	37,474	58.0
Republican	John D Velez	27,045	41.9
Write-in		69	0.1
Total votes		64,588	100%
