= Tigard-Tualatin School District =

School district in Oregon, USA

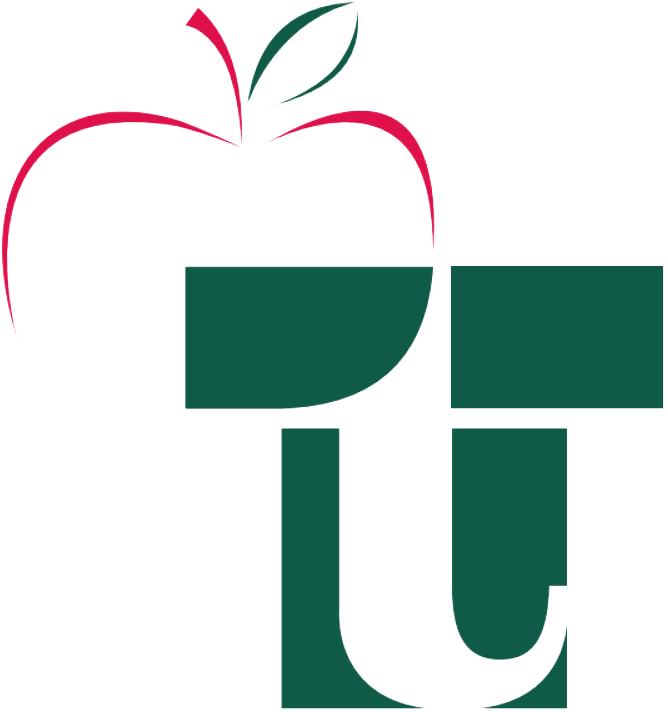

Location
- Washington County, Oregon United States

District information
- Type: Public school district
- Grades: K-12
- Established: 1875
- Superintendent: Iton Udosenata
- Budget: 361,266,958

Students and staff
- Students: 12,625
- Teachers: 648.77 (on an FTE basis)
- Staff: 1,268.29 (on an FTE basis)

Other information
- Website: www.ttsdschools.org

The Tigard-Tualatin School District (23J) is a school district serving part of the suburban Portland metropolitan area in Oregon including all or portions of the cities of Tigard, Tualatin, Durham, and King City, as well as most of the unincorporated communities of Metzger and Bull Mountain.

== History ==
Tigard Elementary School District 23 was established in 1875 under the name of the East Butte School District 23, while the Tualatin district was started as the Bridgeport district (26J). These districts later merged, as did the Tigard high school district (2J) and the Tualatin school district (26J).

From its inception until 1992, the district operated only one "senior" high school, Tigard High, which covered grades 10–12. Fowler and Twality Junior High Schools covered grades 7–9. In 1992, a second high school, Tualatin High, was opened, and the district took the opportunity to switch to a middle school system in which the two high schools would cover grades 9–12, the existing junior high schools changed to middle schools covering grades 6–8, and the elementary schools covered grades K-5. A third middle school, Hazelbrook, was also added in 1992.

When Tualatin High opened, new school attendance boundaries were drawn; most students at Twality would attend Tualatin High and most students at Fowler would attend Tigard High. Students living in certain areas were given the option of attending either high school. Today, all students at Fowler attend Tigard High, all students at Hazelbrook attend Tualatin High, and students at Twality are split across Tigard High and Tualatin High.

== Service area ==
Most of the district is in Washington County. Its boundary includes most of the municipalities of Tigard and Tualatin, all of Durham and King City, the majority of the census-designated places of Bull Mountain and Metzger, and small sections of Lake Oswego and Rivergrove.

A portion is in Clackamas County, where it includes most of that county's portion of Tualatin.

== Demographics ==
In the 2009 school year, the district had 170 students classified as homeless by the Department of Education, or 1.3% of students in the district.

== School Board ==
There are five school board members, each serving four-year terms.

Position	Name	Term ends
1	David Jaimes (chair)	2029
2	Kristin Miles	2027
3	Tristan Irvin (vice chair)	2029
4	Jill Zurschmeide	2027
5	Crystal Weston	2029

== Schools ==
=== High schools ===
- Tigard High School
- Tualatin High School

=== Middle schools ===
==== Fowler Middle School ====
In 2025, Fowler Middle School served pretzels prepared on premises that was contaminated with an Alto Shaam granular oven cleaner. Contamination occurred as a result of school staff accidentally sprinkling the oven cleaner onto pretzels. The Alto Shaam cleaner that was mistaken for salt contains sodium hydroxide which can rapidly cause corrosive injuries. 50 students have consumed pretzels sprinkled with the cleaner. In October 2026, a lawsuit was filed against the district also naming Fowler Middle School's lead cook Joyce A. Webb, and principal Cindy Pellicci as co-defendants.

The school is planned for a rebuild starting in 2027 with plans of opening up for 2029-2030 school year.school year.

- Hazelbrook Middle School
- Twality Middle School

=== Elementary schools ===
- Alberta Rider
- Art Rutkin
- Bridgeport
  - In 2004 the school had some classes in Spanish for students from Spanish-speaking households.
- Byrom
- Charles F. Tigard
- Deer Creek
- Durham
- James Templeton
- Mary Woodward
- Metzger
- Tualatin

One of its 11 elementary schools is slated for closure for fall 2028.

=== Alternative schools ===
- Tigard-Tualatin Online Academy
- Creekside Community High School

== Partnerships ==
In the 1980s the district began its relationship with the Portland Japanese School, a weekend Japanese educational program. The Japanese school used Twality Middle School until 1992, when Hazelbrook Middle School opened. The Japanese school is now held at Hazelbrook. Every summer the Japanese school sends some Tigard-Tualatin school employees to Japan so they can study Japanese culture.

== See also ==
- List of school districts in Oregon
