= 1996 United States Senate elections =

- November 5, 1996; January 30 (Oregon special)
- Class 2

34 (Note: 33 Class 2 seats, as well as 1 Class 3 seat in special election. Does not count the Oregon special election.) of the 100 seats in the United States Senate 51 seats needed for a majority
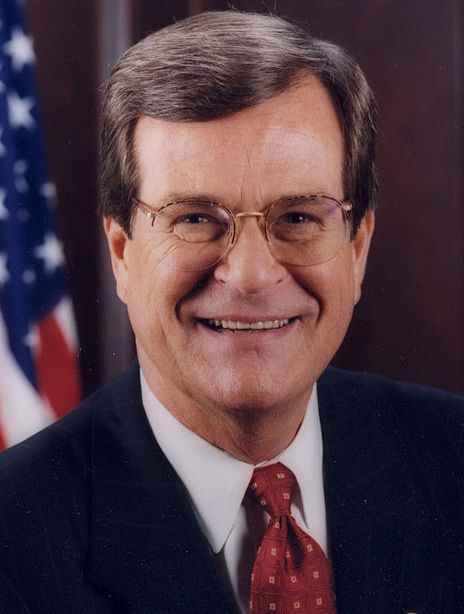

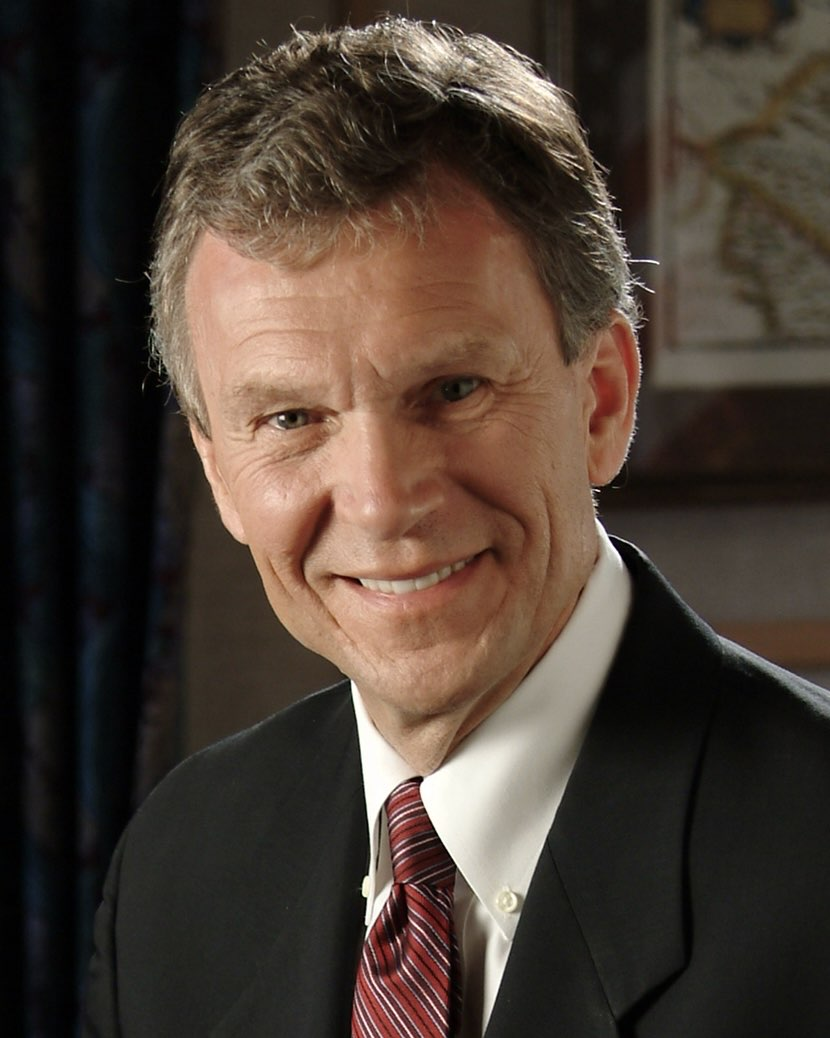
	Majority party	Minority party
Leader	Trent Lott	Tom Daschle
Party	Republican	Democratic
Leader since	June 12, 1996	January 3, 1995
Leader's seat	Mississippi	South Dakota
Seats before	53	47
Seats won	55	45
Seat change	▲2	▼2
Popular vote	24,785,416	23,951,995
Percentage	49.5%	47.8%
Seats up	19	15
Races won	21	13
- Results of the elections (excluding Oregon's Senate special election): Democratic gain Democratic hold Republican gain Republican hold No election Rectangular inset (Kansas): both seats up for election
Majority Leader before election
Trent Lott
Republican
Elected Majority Leader
Trent Lott
Republican

The 1996 United States Senate elections were held on November 5, 1996, with the 33 seats of Class 2 contested in regular elections. Special elections were also held to fill vacancies. They coincided with the presidential election of the same year, in which Democrat Bill Clinton was re-elected president.

Republicans held a 54–46 majority going into 1996, but a January special election in Oregon resulted in Democrats reducing the majority to 53–47. Despite the re-election of Clinton and Al Gore, and despite Democrats picking up a net two seats in the elections to the United States House of Representatives held the same day, the Republicans had a net gain of two seats in the Senate, following major Republican gains two years before in the 1994 elections. As such, combined with neither party making a net gain of Senate seats in 1992, Clinton became the only two-term president to not have any Senate coattails in either of his runs since the ratification of the 17th Amendment in 1913. The Republicans' 55–45 majority also marked the highest number of Senate seats that the party has held since 1920; this achievement would later be tied with the results of the 1998 and 2004 elections.

The Republicans won open seats previously held by Democrats in Alabama, Arkansas, and Nebraska. The only Democratic pickup occurred in South Dakota, where Democrat Tim Johnson narrowly defeated incumbent Republican Larry Pressler. The cycle featured an unusually high number of retirements, with 13 in total.

== Results summary ==
↓
45	55
Democratic	Republican

Does not include Oregon's January 1996 special election. Includes Kansas's special election for the Class III seat vacated by Bob Dole.

Parties					Total
Parties	Democratic	Republican	Libertarian	Other	Total
Last elections (1994)	48	52	0	0	100
Before these elections	47	53	0	0	100
Not up	32	34	—	—	66
Up	15	19	—	—	34
Class 2 (1990→1996)	15	18	—	—	33
Special: Class 3	—	1	—	—	1
Incumbent retired	8	5	—	—	13
Held by same party	5	5	—	—	10
Replaced by other party	▼3 Democrats replaced by ▲3 Republicans		—	—	3
Result	5	8	—	—	13
Incumbent ran	7	14 (Note: In Kansas special election, interim appointee Sheila Frahm lost nomination to represent the state and Sam Brownback became the party's new nominee.)	—	—	21
Won re-election	7	12	—	—	19
Lost re-election	▼1 Republican replaced by ▲1 Democrat		—	—	1
Lost renomination, but held by same party	0	1	—	—	1
Result	8	13	—	—	21
Total elected	13	21	0	0	34
Net gain/loss	▼2	▲2	Steady	Steady	2
Nationwide vote	23,951,995	24,785,416	362,208	969,246	50,068,865
Share	47.84%	49.50%	0.72%	1.94%	100%
Result	45	55	—	—	100

Sources:

- Party Division in the Senate, 1789–Present, via Senate.gov
- Clerk of the U.S. House of Representatives:

== Gains, losses, and holds ==
=== Retirements ===
Map of retirements: Republican incumbent Democratic incumbent Democratic incumbent retired Republican incumbent retired or lost nomination

Five Republicans and eight Democrats retired instead of seeking re-election.

State	Senator	Age at end of term	Assumed office	Replaced by
Alabama	Howell Heflin	75	1979	Jeff Sessions
Arkansas	David Pryor	62	1979	Tim Hutchinson
Colorado	Hank Brown	56	1991	Wayne Allard
Georgia	Sam Nunn	58	1972 (Note: Elected in the special election to finish Richard B. Russell's term and a regular election to the next term.)	Max Cleland
Illinois	Paul Simon	68	1985	Dick Durbin
Kansas (regular)	Nancy Kassebaum	64	1978	Pat Roberts
Louisiana	Bennett Johnston	64	1972	Mary Landrieu
Maine	William Cohen	56	1979	Susan Collins
Nebraska	Jim Exon	75	1979	Chuck Hagel
New Jersey	Bill Bradley	53	1979	Robert Torricelli
Oregon (regular)	Mark Hatfield	74	1967	Gordon H. Smith
Rhode Island	Claiborne Pell	78	1961	Jack Reed
Wyoming	Alan Simpson	65	1979	Mike Enzi

=== Defeats ===
One Republican sought re-election but lost in the general election. One Republican also sought election to finish the unexpired term but lost in the primary.

State	Senator	Assumed office	Replaced by
Kansas (special)	Sheila Frahm	1996 (Note: Appointed to the seat following the resignation of Bob Dole.)	Sam Brownback
South Dakota	Larry Pressler	1979	Tim Johnson

=== Vacancies ===
One Republican seat was vacant and was filled by a Democrat.

State	Senator	Replaced by
Oregon (special)	Bob Packwood	Ron Wyden

== Change in composition ==
=== Before the November elections ===
After the January 1996 special election in Oregon.

D_{1} Ore. (Sp); Gain	D_{2}	D_{3}	D_{4}	D_{5}	D_{6}	D_{7}	D_{8}	D_{9}	D_{10}
D_{20}	D_{19}	D_{18}	D_{17}	D_{16}	D_{15}	D_{14}	D_{13}	D_{12}	D_{11}
D_{21}	D_{22}	D_{23}	D_{24}	D_{25}	D_{26}	D_{27}	D_{28}	D_{29}	D_{30}
D_{40} Mass. Ran	D_{39} La. Retired	D_{38} Iowa; Ran	D_{37} Ill. Retired	D_{36} Ga. Retired	D_{35} Del. Ran	D_{34} Ark. Retired	D_{33} Ala. Retired	D_{32}	D_{31}
D_{41} Mich. Ran	D_{42} Minn. Ran	D_{43} Mont. Ran	D_{44} Neb. Retired	D_{45} N.J. Retired	D_{46} R.I. Retired	D_{47} W.Va. Ran	R_{53} Wyo. Retired	R_{52} Va. Ran	R_{51} Texas; Ran
Majority →									R_{51} Texas; Ran
R_{41} Me. Retired	R_{42} Miss. Ran	R_{43} N.H. Ran	R_{44} N.M. Ran	R_{45} N.C. Ran	R_{46} Okla. Ran	R_{47} Ore. (reg); Retired	R_{48} S.C. Ran	R_{49} S.D. Ran	R_{50} Tenn. Ran
R_{40} Ky. Ran	R_{39} Kan. (Sp); Ran	R_{38} Kan. (reg); Retired	R_{37} Idaho; Ran	R_{36} Colo. Retired	R_{35} Alaska; Ran	R_{34}	R_{33}	R_{32}	R_{31}
R_{21}	R_{22}	R_{23}	R_{24}	R_{25}	R_{26}	R_{27}	R_{28}	R_{29}	R_{30}
R_{20}	R_{19}	R_{18}	R_{17}	R_{16}	R_{15}	R_{14}	R_{13}	R_{12}	R_{11}
R_{1}	R_{2}	R_{3}	R_{4}	R_{5}	R_{6}	R_{7}	R_{8}	R_{9}	R_{10}

=== After the November elections ===
D_{1}	D_{2}	D_{3}	D_{4}	D_{5}	D_{6}	D_{7}	D_{8}	D_{9}	D_{10}
D_{20}	D_{19}	D_{18}	D_{17}	D_{16}	D_{15}	D_{14}	D_{13}	D_{12}	D_{11}
D_{21}	D_{22}	D_{23}	D_{24}	D_{25}	D_{26}	D_{27}	D_{28}	D_{29}	D_{30}
D_{40} Minn. Re-elected	D_{39} Mich. Re-elected	D_{38} Mass. Re-elected	D_{37} La. Hold	D_{36} Iowa; Re-elected	D_{35} Ill. Hold	D_{34} Ga. Hold	D_{33} Del. Re-elected	D_{32}	D_{31}
D_{41} Mont. Re-elected	D_{42} N.J. Hold	D_{43} R.I. Hold	D_{44} W.Va. Re-elected	D_{45} S.D. Gain	R_{55} Neb. Gain	R_{54} Ark. Gain	R_{53} Ala. Gain	R_{52} Wyo. Hold	R_{51} Va. Re-elected
Majority →									R_{51} Va. Re-elected
R_{41} Me. Hold	R_{42} Miss. Re-elected	R_{43} N.H. Re-elected	R_{44} N.M. Re-elected	R_{45} N.C. Re-elected	R_{46} Okla. Re-elected	R_{47} Ore. (reg); Hold	R_{48} S.C. Re-elected	R_{49} Tenn. Re-elected	R_{50} Texas; Re-elected
R_{40} Ky. Re-elected	R_{39} Kan. (Sp); Hold	R_{38} Kan. (reg); Hold	R_{37} Idaho; Re-elected	R_{36} Colo. Hold	R_{35} Alaska; Re-elected	R_{34}	R_{33}	R_{32}	R_{31}
R_{21}	R_{22}	R_{23}	R_{24}	R_{25}	R_{26}	R_{27}	R_{28}	R_{29}	R_{30}
R_{20}	R_{19}	R_{18}	R_{17}	R_{16}	R_{15}	R_{14}	R_{13}	R_{12}	R_{11}
R_{1}	R_{2}	R_{3}	R_{4}	R_{5}	R_{6}	R_{7}	R_{8}	R_{9}	R_{10}

Key	D_{#} / Democratic; R_{#} / Republican

== Summary of contests ==
=== Special elections during the 104th Congress ===
In these special elections, the winner was seated in the fall of 1996 (excluding Oregon), once they qualified and their elections were certified. Sorted by election date, then state, then class.

State	Incumbent			Results	Candidates
State	Senator	Party	Electoral history	Results	Candidates
Oregon (Class 3)	Bob Packwood	Republican	1968; 1974; 1980; 1986; 1992	Incumbent resigned. New senator elected January 30, 1996 and seated February 6, 1996. Democratic gain.	▌ ✓ Ron Wyden (Democratic) 47.8%; ▌Gordon H. Smith (Republican) 46.2%; Others: ▌Karen Shilling (American Independent) 2.1%; ▌Gene Nanni (Libertarian) 1.3%; ▌Vickie Valdez (Socialist) 0.7%; ▌Lou Gold (Pacific Green) 0.6%
Kansas (Class 3)	Sheila Frahm	Republican	1996 (appointed)	Interim appointee lost nomination. New senator elected November 5, 1996 and seated November 7, 1996. Republican hold.	▌ ✓ Sam Brownback (Republican) 53.9%; ▌Jill Docking (Democratic) 43.3%; ▌Donald R. Klaassen (Reform) 2.8%

=== Elections leading to the next Congress ===
In these general elections, the winners were elected for the term beginning January 3, 1997; ordered by state.

All of the elections involved the Class 2 seats.

State	Incumbent			Results	Candidates
State	Senator	Party	Electoral history	Results	Candidates
Alabama	Howell Heflin	Democratic	1978; 1984; 1990	Incumbent retired. Republican gain.	▌ ✓ Jeff Sessions (Republican) 52.5%; ▌Roger Bedford Jr. (Democratic) 45.5%; Others: ▌Mark Thornton (Libertarian) 1.4%; ▌Charles R. Hebner (Natural Law) 0.6%
Alaska	Ted Stevens	Republican	1968 (appointed); 1970; 1972; 1978; 1984; 1990	Incumbent re-elected.	▌ ✓ Ted Stevens (Republican) 76.7%; ▌Jeff Whittaker (Green) 12.5%; ▌Theresa Obermeyer (Democratic) 10.3%
Arkansas	David Pryor	Democratic	1978; 1984; 1990	Incumbent retired. Republican gain.	▌ ✓ Tim Hutchinson (Republican) 52.7%; ▌Winston Bryant (Democratic) 47.3%
Colorado	Hank Brown	Republican	1990	Incumbent retired. Republican hold.	▌ ✓ Wayne Allard (Republican) 51.4%; ▌Tom Strickland (Democratic) 45.7%; ▌Randy MacKenzie (Natural Law) 2.9%
Delaware	Joe Biden	Democratic	1972; 1978; 1984; 1990	Incumbent re-elected.	▌ ✓ Joe Biden (Democratic) 60.0%; ▌Raymond J. Clatworthy (Republican) 38.1%; Others: ▌Mark Jones (Libertarian) 1.2%; ▌Jacqueline Kossoff (Natural Law) 0.6%
Georgia	Sam Nunn	Democratic	1972 (special); 1972; 1978; 1984; 1990	Incumbent retired. Democratic hold.	▌ ✓ Max Cleland (Democratic) 48.9%; ▌Guy Millner (Republican) 47.5%; ▌John Gregory Cashin (Libertarian) 3.6%
Idaho	Larry Craig	Republican	1990	Incumbent re-elected.	▌ ✓ Larry Craig (Republican) 57.0%; ▌Walt Minnick (Democratic) 39.9%; Others: ▌Mary J. Charbonneau (Independent) 2.0%; ▌Susan Vegors (Natural Law) 1.0%
Illinois	Paul Simon	Democratic	1984; 1990	Incumbent retired. Democratic hold.	▌ ✓ Dick Durbin (Democratic) 56.1%; ▌Al Salvi (Republican) 40.7%; Others: ▌Steven H. Perry (Reform) 1.4%; ▌Robin J. Miller (Libertarian) 1%; ▌Chad Koppie (U.S. Taxpayers) 0.4%; ▌James E. Davis (Natural Law) 0.3%
Iowa	Tom Harkin	Democratic	1984; 1990	Incumbent re-elected.	▌ ✓ Tom Harkin (Democratic) 51.8%; ▌Jim Ross Lightfoot (Republican) 46.7%; Others: ▌Sue Atkinson (Independent) 0.8%; ▌Fred Gratzon (Natural Law) 0.3%; ▌Joe Sulentic (Independent) 0.2%; ▌Shirley E. Pena (Socialist Workers) 0.2%
Kansas	Nancy Kassebaum	Republican	1978; 1978 (appointed); 1984; 1990	Incumbent retired. Republican hold.	▌ ✓ Pat Roberts (Republican) 62.0%; ▌Sally Thompson (Democratic) 34.4%; Others: ▌Mark S. Marney (Reform) 2.3%; ▌Steven Rosile (Libertarian) 1.2%
Kentucky	Mitch McConnell	Republican	1984; 1990	Incumbent re-elected.	▌ ✓ Mitch McConnell (Republican) 55.5%; ▌Steve Beshear (Democratic) 42.8%; Others: ▌Dennis L. Lacy (Libertarian) 0.7%; ▌Patricia Jo Metten (Natural Law) 0.6%; ▌Mac McElroy (U.S. Taxpayers) 0.4%
Louisiana	Bennett Johnston	Democratic	1972; 1972 (appointed); 1978; 1984; 1990	Incumbent retired. Democratic hold.	▌ ✓ Mary Landrieu (Democratic) 50.1%; ▌Woody Jenkins (Republican) 49.9%
Maine	William Cohen	Republican	1978; 1984; 1990	Incumbent retired. Republican hold.	▌ ✓ Susan Collins (Republican) 49.2%; ▌Joseph E. Brennan (Democratic) 43.8%; ▌John Rensenbrink (Green) 4.0%; ▌William P. Clarke (U.S. Taxpayers) 3%
Massachusetts	John Kerry	Democratic	1984; 1990	Incumbent re-elected.	▌ ✓ John Kerry (Democratic) 52.2%; ▌Bill Weld (Republican) 44.7%; ▌Susan Gallagher (Conservative) 2.7%; ▌Robert Stowe (Natural Law) 0.3%
Michigan	Carl Levin	Democratic	1978; 1984; 1990	Incumbent re-elected.	▌ ✓ Carl Levin (Democratic) 58.4%; ▌Ronna Romney (Republican) 39.9%; Others: ▌Kenneth L. Proctor (Libertarian) 1.0%; ▌William Roundtree (Workers World) 0.3%; ▌Joseph S. Mattingly (Natural Law) 0.3%; ▌Martin P. McLaughlin (Socialist Equality) 0.2%
Minnesota	Paul Wellstone	DFL	1990	Incumbent re-elected.	▌ ✓ Paul Wellstone (DFL) 50.3%; ▌Rudy Boschwitz (Republican) 41.3%; ▌Dean Barkley (Reform) 7%; Others: ▌Tim Davis (Grass Roots) 0.6%; ▌Roy Ezra Carlton (Libertarian) 0.2%; ▌Steve Johnson (Natural Law) 0.2%; ▌Thomas A. Fiske (Socialist Workers) 0.1%
Mississippi	Thad Cochran	Republican	1978; 1978 (appointed); 1984; 1990	Incumbent re-elected.	▌ ✓ Thad Cochran (Republican) 71.0%; ▌James Hunt (Democratic) 27.4%; ▌Ted Weill (Independence) 1.6%
Montana	Max Baucus	Democratic	1978; 1984; 1990	Incumbent re-elected.	▌ ✓ Max Baucus (Democratic) 49.5%; ▌Denny Rehberg (Republican) 44.7%; ▌Becky Shaw (Reform) 4.7%; ▌Stephen Heaton (Natural Law) 1%
Nebraska	Jim Exon	Democratic	1978; 1984; 1990	Incumbent retired. Republican gain.	▌ ✓ Chuck Hagel (Republican) 56.1%; ▌Ben Nelson (Democratic) 41.7%
New Hampshire	Bob Smith	Republican	1990; 1990 (appointed)	Incumbent re-elected.	▌ ✓ Bob Smith (Republican) 49.3%; ▌Richard N. Swett (Democratic) 46.2%; ▌Ken Blevens (Libertarian) 4.5%
New Jersey	Bill Bradley	Democratic	1978; 1984; 1990	Incumbent retired. Democratic hold.	▌ ✓ Robert Torricelli (Democratic) 52.7%; ▌Dick Zimmer (Republican) 42.5%; Others: ▌Richard J. Pezzullo (Independent) 1.8%; ▌Mary Jo Christian (Independent) 0.8%; ▌Paul A. Woomer (Independent) 0.5%; ▌Olga L. Rodriguez (Independent) 0.5%; ▌Mark Wise (Independent) 0.5%; ▌Wilburt Kornegay (Independent) 0.4%; ▌Steven J. Baeli (Independent) 0.3%
New Mexico	Pete Domenici	Republican	1972; 1978; 1984; 1990	Incumbent re-elected.	▌ ✓ Pete Domenici (Republican) 64.7%; ▌Art Trujillo (Democratic) 29.8%; ▌Abraham Guttman (Green) 4.4%; ▌Bruce M. Bush (Libertarian) 1.1%
North Carolina	Jesse Helms	Republican	1972; 1978; 1984; 1990	Incumbent re-elected.	▌ ✓ Jesse Helms (Republican) 52.6%; ▌Harvey Gantt (Democratic) 45.9%; Others: ▌Ray Ubinger (Libertarian) 1.0%; ▌J. Victor Pardo (Natural Law) 0.4%
Oklahoma	Jim Inhofe	Republican	1994 (special)	Incumbent re-elected.	▌ ✓ Jim Inhofe (Republican) 56.7%; ▌James Boren (Democratic) 40.1%; Others: ▌Bill Maguire (Independent) 1.3%; ▌Agnes Marie Regier (Libertarian) 1.2%; ▌Chris Nedbalek (Independent) 0.7%
Oregon	Mark Hatfield	Republican	1966; 1972; 1978; 1984; 1990	Incumbent retired. Republican hold.	▌ ✓ Gordon H. Smith (Republican) 49.8%; ▌Tom Bruggere (Democratic) 45.9%; Others: ▌Brent Thompson (Reform) 1.5%; ▌Gary Kutcher (Green) 1.0%; ▌Paul Mohn (Libertarian) 0.9%; ▌Christopher Phelps (Socialist) 0.4%; ▌Michael L. Hoyes (Natural Law) 0.3%
Rhode Island	Claiborne Pell	Democratic	1960; 1966; 1972; 1978; 1984; 1990	Incumbent retired. Democratic hold.	▌ ✓ Jack Reed (Democratic) 63.3%; ▌Nancy J. Mayer (Republican) 35%; ▌Donald W. Lovejoy (Independent) 1.7%
South Carolina	Strom Thurmond	Republican	1954 (write-in) (Note: Senator Strom Thurmond was originally elected as a Democrat in 1954, but as a write-in candidate, a special election in 1956 and 1960 before switching to a Republican in 1964. Thurmond won re-election as a Republican in 1966, 1972, 1978, 1984 and 1990.); 1954 (appointed); 1956 (resigned); 1956 (special); 1960; 1966; 1972; 1978; 1984; 1990	Incumbent re-elected.	▌ ✓ Strom Thurmond (Republican) 53.4%; ▌Elliot Close (Democratic) 44.0%; Others: ▌Richard T. Quillian (Libertarian) 1.1%; ▌Peter J. Ashy (Reform) 0.8%; ▌Annette C. Estes (Natural Law) 0.7%
South Dakota	Larry Pressler	Republican	1978; 1984; 1990	Incumbent lost re-election. Democratic gain.	▌ ✓ Tim Johnson (Democratic) 51.3%; ▌Larry Pressler (Republican) 48.7%
Tennessee	Fred Thompson	Republican	1994 (special)	Incumbent re-elected.	▌ ✓ Fred Thompson (Republican) 61.4%; ▌J. Houston Gordon (Democratic) 36.8%; Others: ▌John Jay Hooker (Independent) 0.8%; ▌Bruce Gold (Independent) 0.3%; ▌Robert O. Watson (Independent) 0.3%; ▌Greg Samples (Independent) 0.2%; ▌Philip L. Kienlen (Independent) 0.1%
Texas	Phil Gramm	Republican	1984; 1990	Incumbent re-elected.	▌ ✓ Phil Gramm (Republican) 54.8%; ▌Victor Morales (Democratic) 43.9%; Others: ▌Michael Bird (Libertarian) 0.9%; ▌John Huff (Natural Law) 0.4%
Virginia	John Warner	Republican	1978; 1979 (appointed); 1984; 1990; 1996	Incumbent re-elected.	▌ ✓ John Warner (Republican) 52.5%; ▌Mark Warner (Democratic) 47.4%
West Virginia	Jay Rockefeller	Democratic	1984; 1990	Incumbent re-elected.	▌ ✓ Jay Rockefeller (Democratic) 76.6%; ▌Betty Burks (Republican) 23.4%
Wyoming	Alan Simpson	Republican	1978; 1979 (appointed); 1984; 1990	Incumbent retired. Republican hold.	▌ ✓ Mike Enzi (Republican) 54.1%; ▌Kathy Karpan (Democratic) 42.2%; ▌W. David Herbert (Libertarian) 2.5%; ▌Lloyd Marsden (Natural Law) 1.2%

== Closest races ==
Sixteen races, as well as the Oregon special election in January, had margins less than 10%:

State	Party of winner	Margin
Louisiana	Democratic	0.34%
Georgia	Democratic	1.3%
Oregon (special)	Democratic (flip)	1.5%
South Dakota	Democratic (flip)	2.6%
New Hampshire	Republican	3.0%
Oregon (regular)	Republican	3.9%
Montana	Democratic	4.9%
Virginia	Republican	5.1%
Iowa	Democratic	5.1%
Maine	Republican	5.3%
Arkansas	Republican (flip)	5.4% (Note: Arkansas was the "tipping point" state.)
Colorado	Republican	5.7%
North Carolina	Republican	6.7%
Alabama	Republican (flip)	7.0%
Massachusetts	Democratic	7.5%
Minnesota	Democratic	9.0%
South Carolina	Republican	9.4%

== Alabama ==
Alabama election
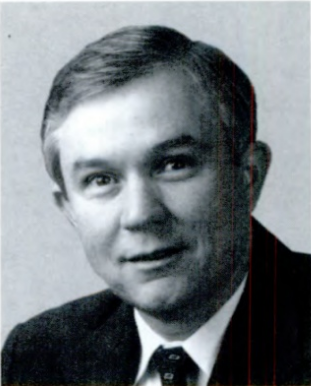

Nominee	Jeff Sessions	Roger Bedford
Party	Republican	Democratic
Popular vote	786,436	681,651
Percentage	52.5%	45.5%
- County results Sessions: 40–50% 50–60% 60–70% 70–80% Bedford: 40–50% 50–60% 60–70% 70–80% 80–90%
U.S. senator before election
Howell Heflin
Democratic
Elected U.S. Senator
Jeff Sessions
Republican

Incumbent Democrat Howell Heflin decided to retire. Republican and future Attorney General of the United States Jeff Sessions won the open seat, becoming only the second Republican U.S. Senator elected to represent Alabama since Reconstruction. This seat would remain controlled by Republicans until the election of Doug Jones in 2017.

In the 1968 presidential election, Alabama supported American Independent Party candidate George Wallace over both Richard Nixon and Hubert Humphrey. Wallace was the official Democratic candidate in Alabama, while Humphrey was listed as the "National Democratic". In 1976, Democratic candidate Jimmy Carter from Georgia carried the state, the region, and the nation, but Democratic control of the region slipped after that.

Since 1980, conservative Alabama voters have increasingly voted for Republican candidates at the Federal level, especially in Presidential elections. By contrast, Democratic candidates have been elected to many state-level offices and, until 2010, comprised a longstanding majority in the Alabama Legislature.

Roger Bedford won the Democratic primary over Glen Browder. Sessions won the Republican primary over Sid McDonald and Charles Woods, defeating McDonald in the runoff. Sessions then defeated Bedford by a seven-point margin.

June 4 Democratic primary results
Party	Candidate	Votes	%
Democratic	Roger Bedford	141,360	44.77%
Democratic	Glen Browder	91,203	28.89%
Democratic	Natalie Davis	71,588	22.67%
Democratic	Marilyn Q. Bromberg	11,573	3.67%
Total votes		315,724	100.00%

June 25 Democratic runoff results
Party	Candidate	Votes	%
Democratic	Roger Bedford	141,747	61.59%
Democratic	Glen Browder	88,415	38.41%
Total votes		230,162	100.00%

June 4 Republican primary results
Party	Candidate	Votes	%
Republican	Jeff Sessions	82,373	37.81%
Republican	Sid McDonald	47,320	21.72%
Republican	Charles Woods	24,409	11.20%
Republican	Frank McRight	21,964	10.08%
Republican	Walter D. Clark	18,745	8.60%
Republican	Jimmy Blake	15,385	7.06%
Republican	Albert Lipscomb	7,672	3.52%
Total votes		217,868	100.00%

June 25 Republican runoff results
Party	Candidate	Votes	%
Republican	Jeff Sessions	81,681	59.26%
Republican	Sid McDonald	56,156	40.74%
Total votes		137,837	100.00%

General election results
Party	Candidate	Votes	%
Republican	Jeff Sessions	786,436	52.45%
Democratic	Roger Bedford	681,651	45.46%
Libertarian	Mark Thornton	21,550	1.44%
Natural Law	Charles Hebner	9,123	0.61%
Independent	Write-ins	633	0.04%
Total votes		1,499,393	100.00%
Republican gain from Democratic			

== Alaska ==
Alaska election
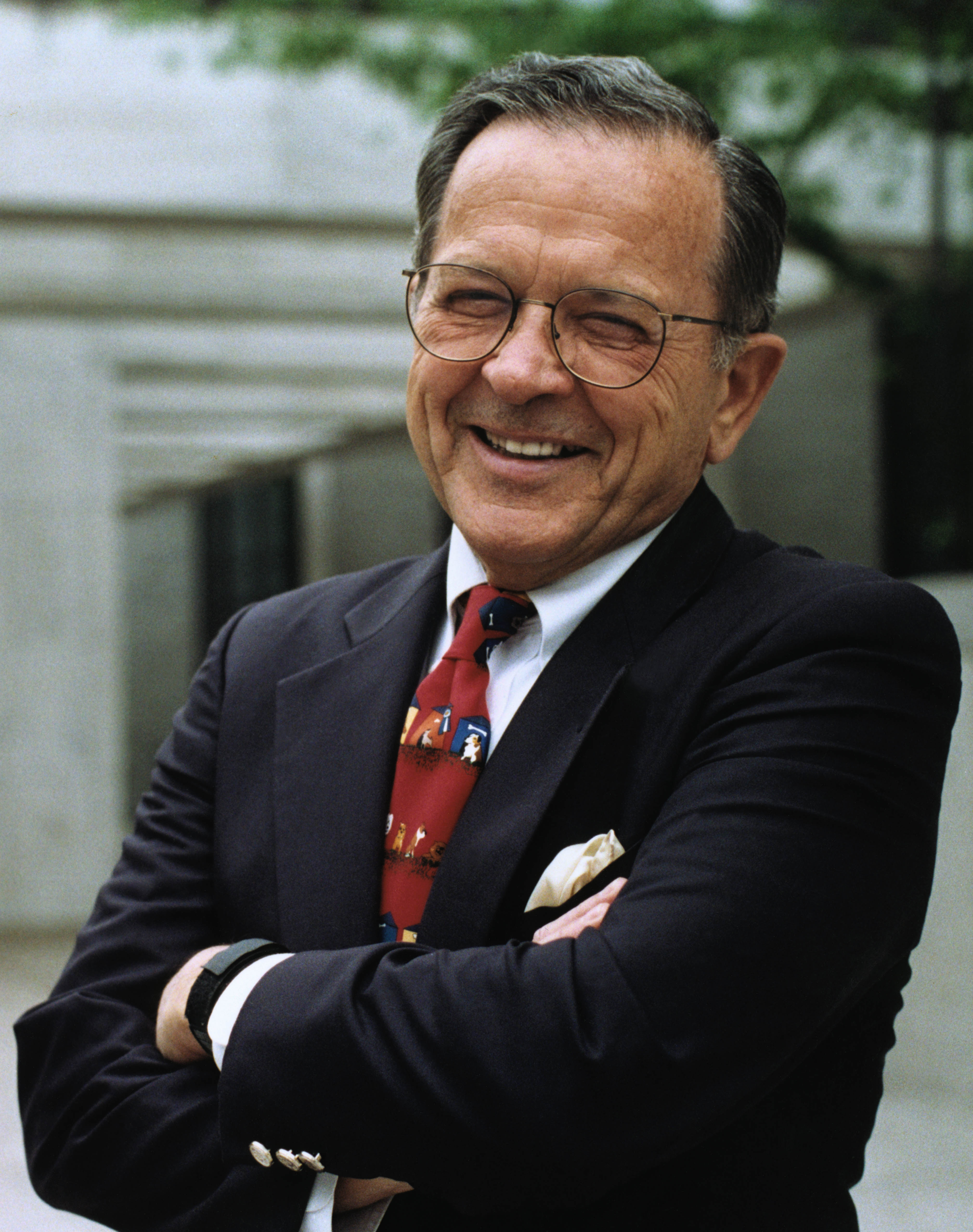

Nominee	Ted Stevens	Jed Whittaker
Party	Republican	Green
Popular vote	177,893	29,037
Percentage	76.71%	12.52%
Nominee	Theresa Obermeyer
Party	Democratic
Popular vote	23,977
Percentage	10.34%
- Results by state house district Stevens: 50–60% 60–70% 70–80% 80–90%
U.S. senator before election
Ted Stevens
Republican
Elected U.S. Senator
Ted Stevens
Republican

Incumbent Republican Ted Stevens ran for re-election to a sixth term. He defeated Republican Dave W. Cuddy in the open primary.

In the general election, Stevens faced off against Democratic nominee Theresa Obermeyer, a former member of the Anchorage School Board, and Green Party nominee Jed Whittaker, a commercial fisherman.

The race drew national attention for Obermeyer's erratic behavior: she blamed Stevens for her husband's failure to pass the bar exam and contended that he had passed the bar by fraud. She "trailed" him to campaign events, frequently wearing a prisoner's outfit and once dragging a ball and chain behind her. During the campaign, she was arrested and served 30 days in prison in California and Oregon for probation violations.

Stevens was re-elected in an overwhelming landslide and Whittaker finished ahead of Obermeyer.

Open primary
Party	Candidate	Votes	%
Republican	Ted Stevens (incumbent)	71,043	58.87%
Republican	Dave W. Cuddy	32,994	27.34%
Democratic	Theresa Obermeyer	4,072	3.37%
Green	Jed Whittaker	3,751	3.11%
Democratic	Joseph A. Sonneman	2,643	2.19%
Democratic	Michael Beasley	1,968	1.63%
Democratic	Henry J. Blake Jr.	1,157	0.96%
Democratic	Lawrence Freiberger	921	0.76%
Republican	Charles E. McKee	842	0.70%
Democratic	Frank Vondersaar	655	0.54%
Democratic	Robert Alan Gigler	631	0.52%
Total votes		138,492	100.00%

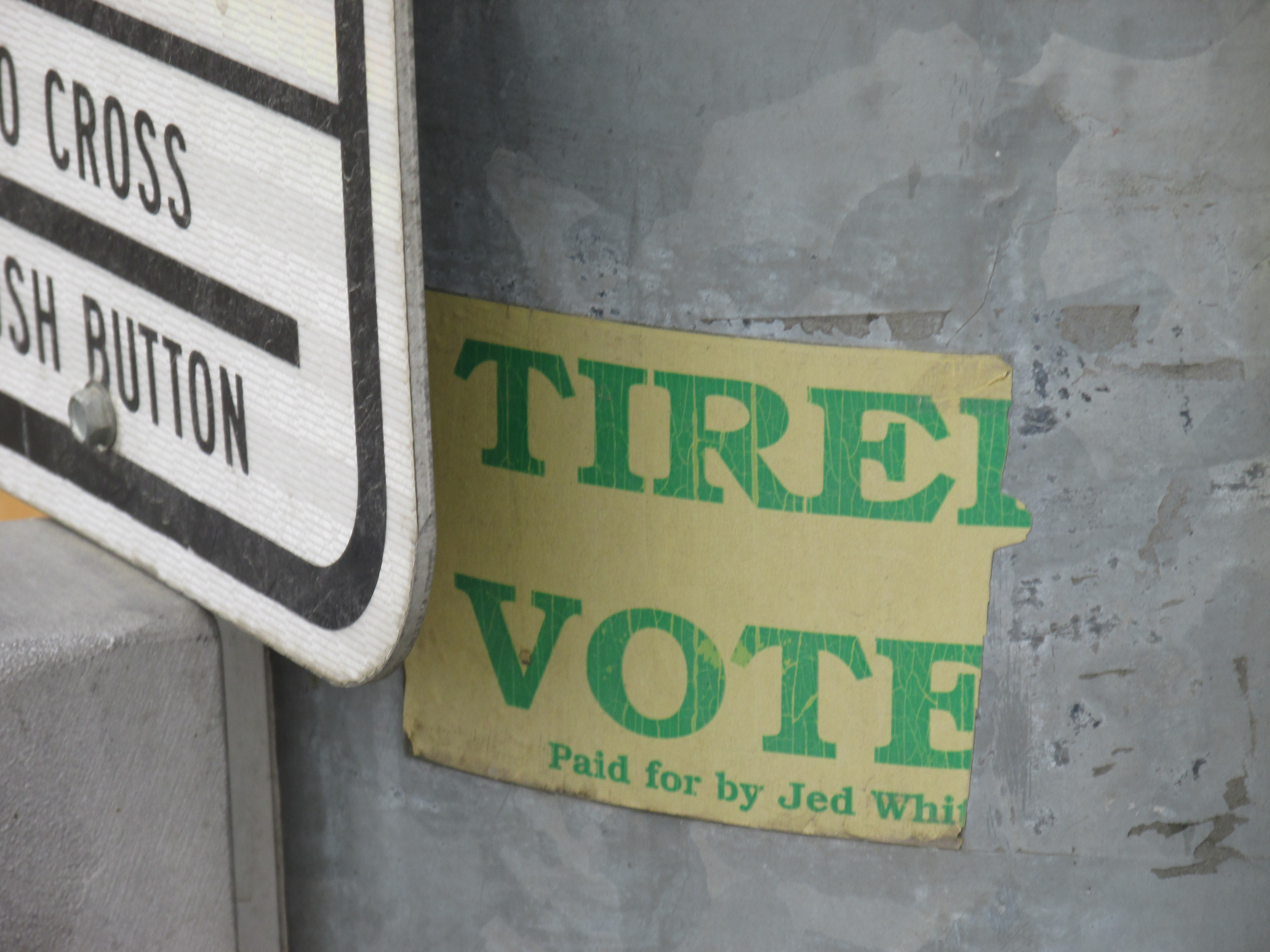
Remnant of Whittaker's campaign bumper sticker, photographed on a light pole on South Cushman Street in Fairbanks in 2014. The bumper sticker read "Tired of Ted? Vote for Jed!"

1996 United States Senate election in Alaska
Party	Candidate	Votes	%	±%
Republican	Ted Stevens (incumbent)	177,893	76.71%	+10.48%
Green	Jed Whittaker	29,037	12.52%	
Democratic	Theresa Obermeyer	23,977	10.34%	−21.85%
Write-ins		1,009	0.44%	
Majority		148,856	64.19%	+30.15%
Turnout		231,916		
Republican hold		Swing		

== Arkansas ==
Arkansas election
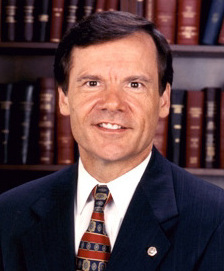

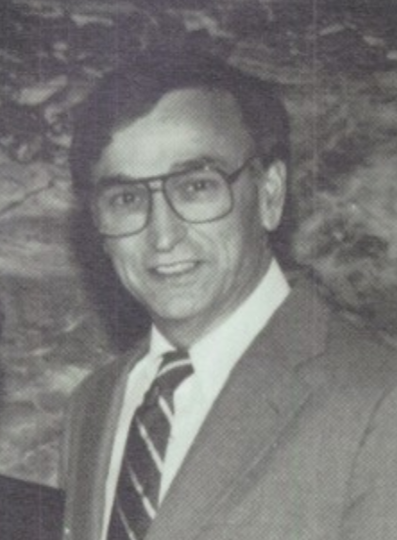
Nominee	Tim Hutchinson	Winston Bryant
Party	Republican	Democratic
Popular vote	445,942	400,241
Percentage	52.7%	47.3%
- County results Hutchinson: 50–60% 60–70% 70–80% Bryant: 50–60% 60–70% 70–80%
U.S. senator before election
David Pryor
Democratic
Elected U.S. Senator
Tim Hutchinson
Republican

Incumbent Democrat David Pryor decided to retire. Republican Tim Hutchinson ran unopposed in the Republican primary. Arkansas Attorney General Winston Bryant defeated State Senator Lu Hardin narrowly in the Democratic primary runoff. Hutchinson narrowly prevailed in the general election despite Bill Clinton's victory in the state, winning the open seat.

Arkansas U.S. Senate election 1996
Party	Candidate	Votes	%
Republican	Tim Hutchinson	445,942	52.7%
Democratic	Winston Bryant	400,241	47.3%
Majority		45,701	5.4%
Turnout		846,183	100.0%
Republican gain from Democratic			

== Colorado ==
Colorado election
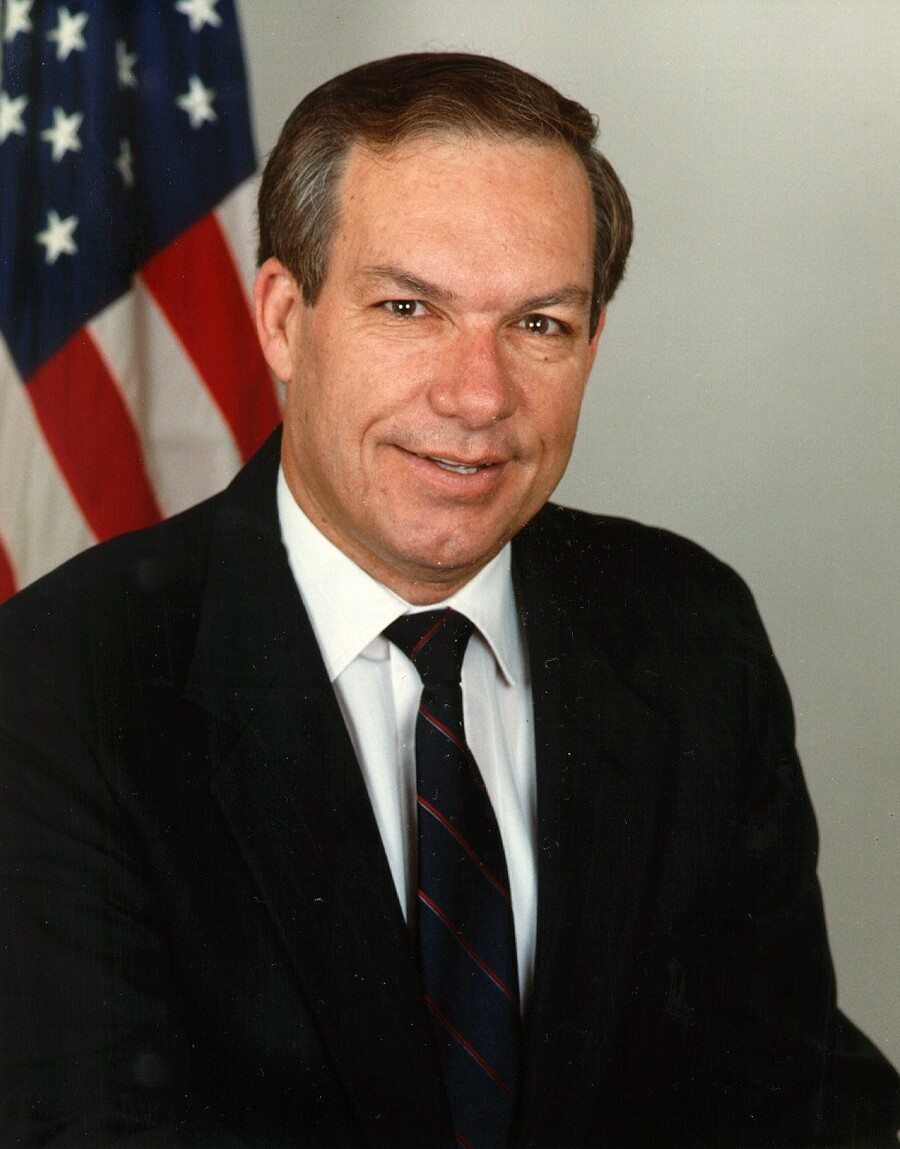

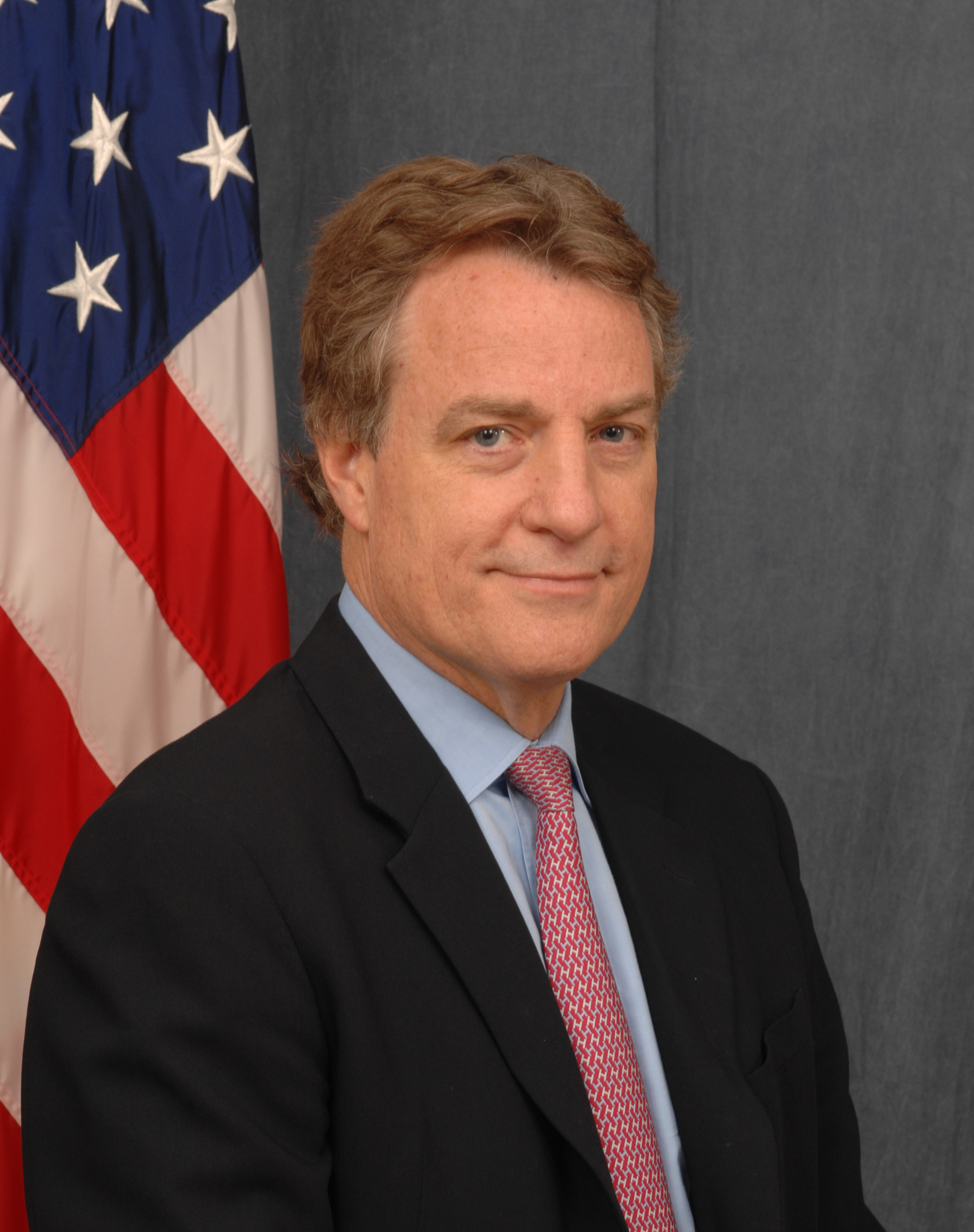
Nominee	Wayne Allard	Tom Strickland
Party	Republican	Democratic
Popular vote	750,315	667,600
Percentage	51.4%	45.7%
- County results Allard: 40–50% 50–60% 60–70% 70–80% Strickland: 50–60% 60–70%
U.S. senator before election
Hank Brown
Republican
Elected U.S. Senator
Wayne Allard
Republican

Incumbent Republican Hank Brown decided to retire instead of seeking a second term. Republican Congressman Wayne Allard won the open seat after defeating Gale Norton in the primary, beating Democrat Tom Strickland, attorney and former U.S. Attorney for the District of Colorado, who himself had defeated Gene Nichol in the Democratic primary.

Democratic primary
Party	Candidate	Votes	%
Democratic	Tom Strickland	87,294	66.13%
Democratic	Gene Nichol	44,709	33.87%
Total votes		132,003	100.00%

Republican primary
Party	Candidate	Votes	%
Republican	Wayne Allard	115,064	56.83%
Republican	Gale Norton	87,394	43.17%
Total votes		202,458	100.00%

General election
Party	Candidate	Votes	%	±%
Republican	Wayne Allard	750,315	51.41%	−4.27%
Democratic	Tom Strickland	667,600	45.74%	+4.08%
Natural Law	Randy MacKenzie	41,620	2.85%	
Write-ins		66	<0.01%	
Majority		82,715	5.67%	−8.35%
Turnout		1,459,601		
Republican hold		Swing		

== Delaware ==
Delaware election
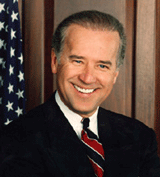

Nominee	Joe Biden	Raymond Clatworthy
Party	Democratic	Republican
Popular vote	165,465	105,088
Percentage	60.0%	38.1%
- County results Biden: 50–60% 60–70%
U.S. senator before election
Joe Biden
Democratic
Elected U.S. Senator
Joe Biden
Democratic

Incumbent Democrat Joe Biden won re-election to a fifth term, beating Republican businessman Raymond Clatworthy, who claimed the Republican nomination in a landslide.

Republican primary
Party	Candidate	Votes	%
Republican	Raymond J. Clatworthy	18,638	82.24%
Republican	Vance Phillips	3,307	14.59%
Republican	Wilfred Plomis	717	3.17%
Total votes		22,662	100.00%

General election
Party	Candidate	Votes	%	±%
Democratic	Joe Biden (incumbent)	165,465	60.04%	−2.64%
Republican	Raymond J. Clatworthy	105,088	38.13%	+2.30%
Libertarian	Mark Jones	3,340	1.21%	−0.28%
Natural Law	Jacqueline Kossoff	1,698	0.62%	
Majority		60,377	21.91%	−4.94%
Turnout		275,591		
Democratic hold		Swing		

== Georgia ==
Georgia election
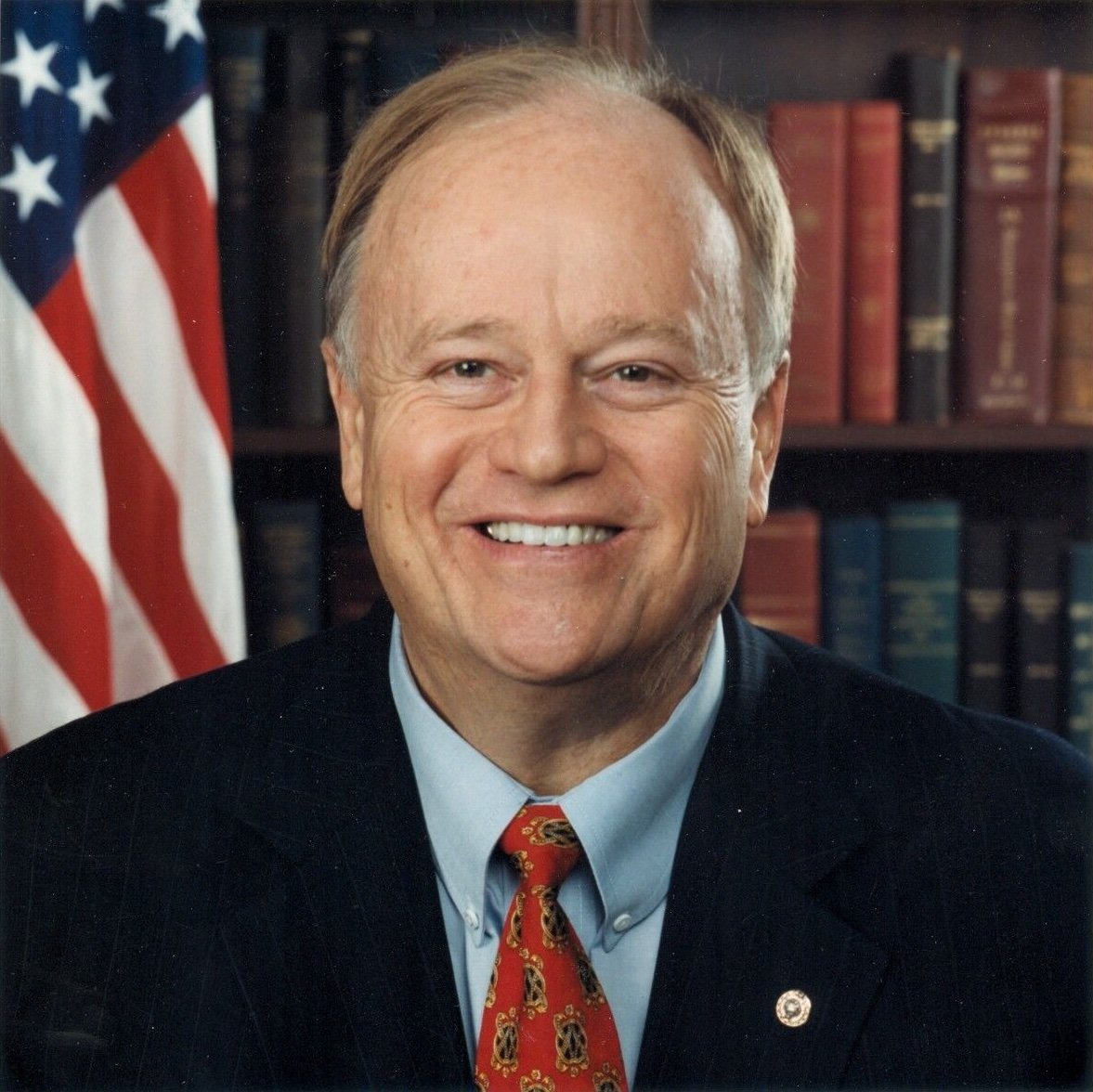

Nominee	Max Cleland	Guy Millner
Party	Democratic	Republican
Popular vote	1,103,993	1,073,969
Percentage	48.9%	47.5%
- County results Cleland: 40–50% 50–60% 60–70% 70–80% Millner: 40–50% 50–60% 60–70%
U.S. senator before election
Sam Nunn
Democratic
Elected U.S. Senator
Max Cleland
Democratic

Incumbent Democrat Sam Nunn decided to retire instead of seeking a fifth term. Republicans nominated Guy Millner, a multi-millionaire businessman who had also run unsuccessfully against Zell Miller in the 1994 gubernatorial election. Millner emerged as the victor from a crowded six-person primary in July 1996, which included State Senator Clint Day and former gubernatorial candidate Johnny Isakson. However, Max Cleland, the Secretary of State of Georgia, ran unopposed in the Democratic primary.

Despite this seat being held by Democrats since 1852, the election became tightly contested between Cleland and Millner. It was the closest race for that seat since at least 1852. Nonetheless, Cleland defeated Millner on November 5. Cleland narrowly edged out a victory with 1,103,993 votes (48.87%) to Millner's 1,073,969 votes (47.54%) – a margin of 1.33%.

The Class 2 United States Senate seat had been reliably Democratic, with a member of that party holding it since 1852. Additionally, no Republican had ever held this seat since it was established in 1789. In fact, during the previous election, Sam Nunn was unanimously re-elected and defeated Mike Hicks by an almost 60% margin in 1984. Republican Paul Coverdell narrowly unseated Democrat Wyche Fowler in Georgia's other United States Senate seat in 1992. On October 9, 1995, four-term incumbent Class 2 Senator Sam Nunn announced his retirement. This left the seat open for the first time since 1972.

After the retirement of Sam Nunn, Democrats began seeking a successor for him. Eventually, Secretary of State of Georgia Max Cleland entered the race. Cleland was the only Democratic candidate to file for election, and thus he became the nominee by default on July 9, 1996. During the primary, he received 517,697 votes – 100%.

Republicans also saw opportunity with an open Senate seat in Georgia. Six candidates filled to enter the primary election and become the Republican nominee after July 9, 1996.

After the Republican primary, Guy Millner emerged as the nominee. Charles Bullock, a political scientist at the University of Georgia, noted that defeated rival Johnny Isakson was more likely to win the moderate vote due to his pro-abortion rights views on abortion. Several polls earlier that year showed Cleland defeating both Millner and Isakson. In contrast to Isakson's opinion, Guy Millner was opposed to abortion except in the case of rape, incest, or to save the life of the mother. Isakson was later elected United States senator after Zell Miller retired from his seat in 2004. Opponent Max Cleland quickly labeled Millner as an extremist, saying, "I think people in this state want to elect a moderate ... not an extremist, not an ideologue, and not somebody hung up on some ideological agenda." In response, Millner began campaigning on other issues to capture more moderate voters.

On election day, Democratic nominee Max Cleland narrowly won against Republican Guy Millner. It was one of the closest United States Senate elections in the history of Georgia. Cleland received 1,103,993 votes to Millner's 1,073,969 votes. Libertarian candidate Jack Cashin obtained 81,262 votes, while only eight people voted for Independent Arlene Rubinstein.

General election
Party	Candidate	Votes	%
Democratic	Max Cleland	1,103,993	48.87%
Republican	Guy Millner	1,073,969	47.54%
Libertarian	Jack Cashin	81,262	3.60%
Independent	Arlene Rubinstein	8	0.00%
Majority		30,024	1.33%
Turnout		2,259,232	
Democratic hold			

== Idaho ==
Idaho election
- November 4, 1996
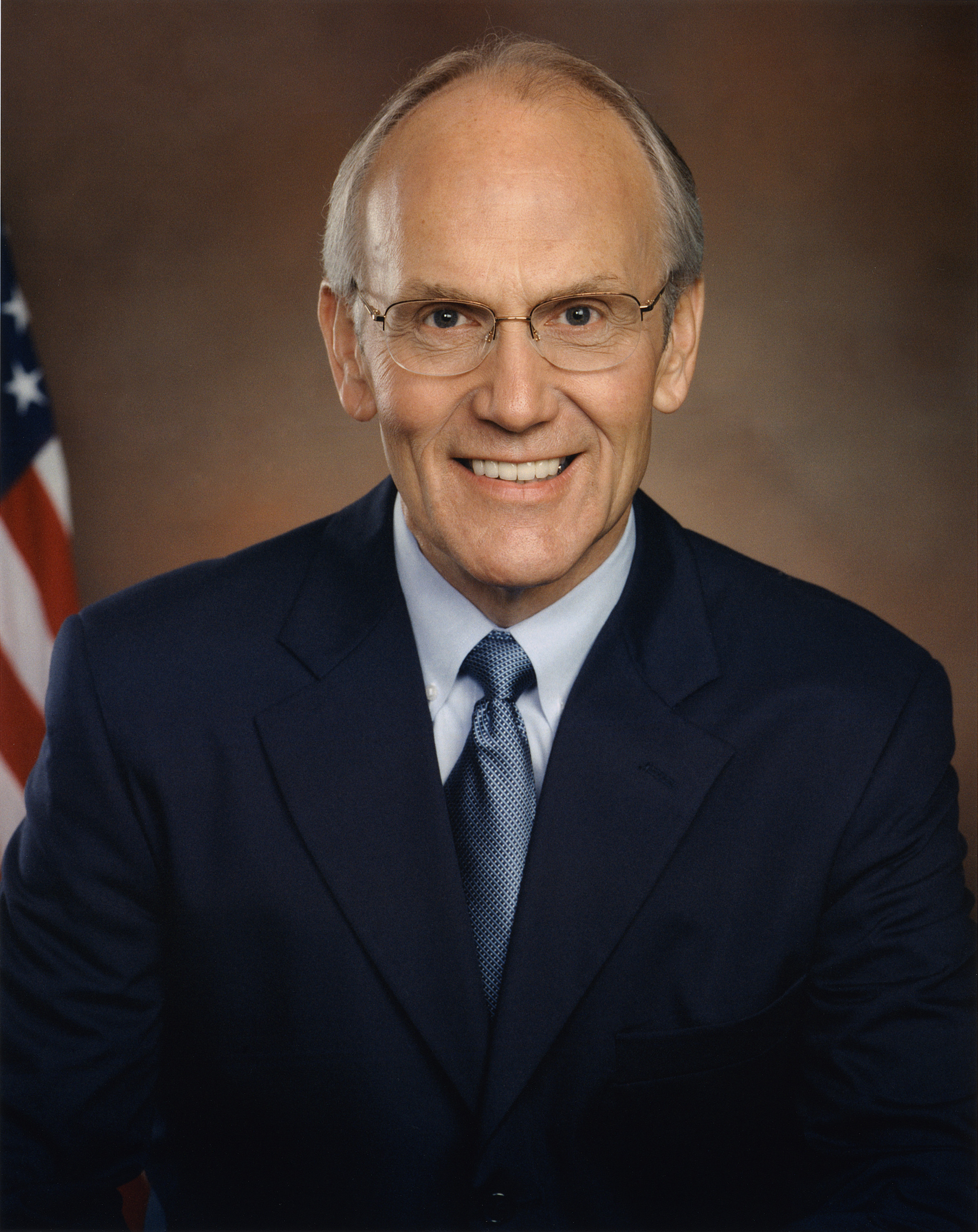

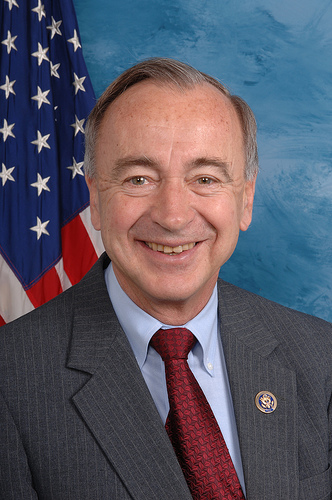
Nominee	Larry Craig	Walt Minnick
Party	Republican	Democratic
Popular vote	283,532	198,422
Percentage	57.0%	39.9%
- County results Craig: 40–50% 50–60% 60–70% 70–80% Minnick: 50–60% 60–70%
U.S. senator before election
Larry Craig
Republican
Elected U.S. Senator
Larry Craig
Republican

Incumbent Larry Craig won re-election against Democrat Walt Minnick, businessman and former Nixon Administration official, in a landslide.

Democratic primary
Party	Candidate	Votes	%
Democratic	Walt Minnick	34,551	100.00%
Total votes		34,551	100.00%

Republican primary
Party	Candidate	Votes	%
Republican	Larry Craig (incumbent)	106,817	100.00%
Total votes		106,817	100.00%

General election
Party	Candidate	Votes	%	±%
Republican	Larry Craig (incumbent)	283,532	57.02%	−4.27%
Democratic	Walt Minnick	198,422	39.91%	+1.20%
Independent	Mary J. Charbonneau	10,137	2.04%	
Natural Law	Susan Vegors	5,142	1.03%	
Majority		85,110	17.12%	−5.47%
Turnout		497,233		
Republican hold		Swing		

== Illinois ==
Illinois election
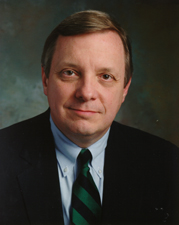

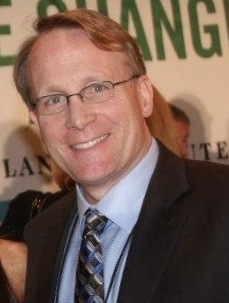
Nominee	Dick Durbin	Al Salvi
Party	Democratic	Republican
Popular vote	2,384,028	1,728,824
Percentage	56.09%	40.67%
- County results Durbin: 40–50% 50–60% 60–70% Salvi: 40–50% 50–60% 60–70%
U.S. senator before election
Paul Simon
Democratic
Elected U.S. Senator
Dick Durbin
Democratic

Incumbent Democrat Paul Simon opted to retire rather than seek a third term. In the Democratic primary, Congressman Dick Durbin emerged victorious over future governor Pat Quinn, while State Representative Al Salvi won the Republican primary in an upset over incumbent Lieutenant Governor Bob Kustra. Though the election was initially anticipated to be close, Durbin defeated Salvi by a comfortable 15-point margin of victory, allowing him to win what would be the first of several terms in the Senate.

Democratic primary
Party	Candidate	Votes	%
Democratic	Dick Durbin	512,520	64.87%
Democratic	Pat Quinn	233,138	29.51%
Democratic	Ronald F. Gibbs	17,681	2.24%
Democratic	Jalil Ahmad	17,211	2.18%
Democratic	Paul H. D. Park	9,505	1.20%
Total votes		790,055	100.00%

Republican primary
Party	Candidate	Votes	%
Republican	Al Salvi	377,141	47.64%
Republican	Bob Kustra	342,935	43.32%
Republican	Robert Marshall	43,937	5.55%
Republican	Martin Paul Gallagher	17,276	2.18%
Republican	Wayne S. Kurzeja	10,356	1.31%
Total votes		791,645	100.00%

Illinois general election
Party	Candidate	Votes	%	±%
Democratic	Dick Durbin	2,384,028	56.09%	−8.98%
Republican	Al Salvi	1,728,824	40.67%	+5.74%
Reform	Steven H. Perry	61,023	1.44%	
Libertarian	Robin J. Miller	41,218	0.97%	
Constitution	Chad N. Koppie	17,563	0.40%	
Natural Law	James E. Davis	13,838	0.33%	
Write-ins		4,228	0.10%	
Majority		655,204	15.41%	−14.72%
Turnout		4,250,722		
Democratic hold		Swing		

== Iowa ==
Iowa election
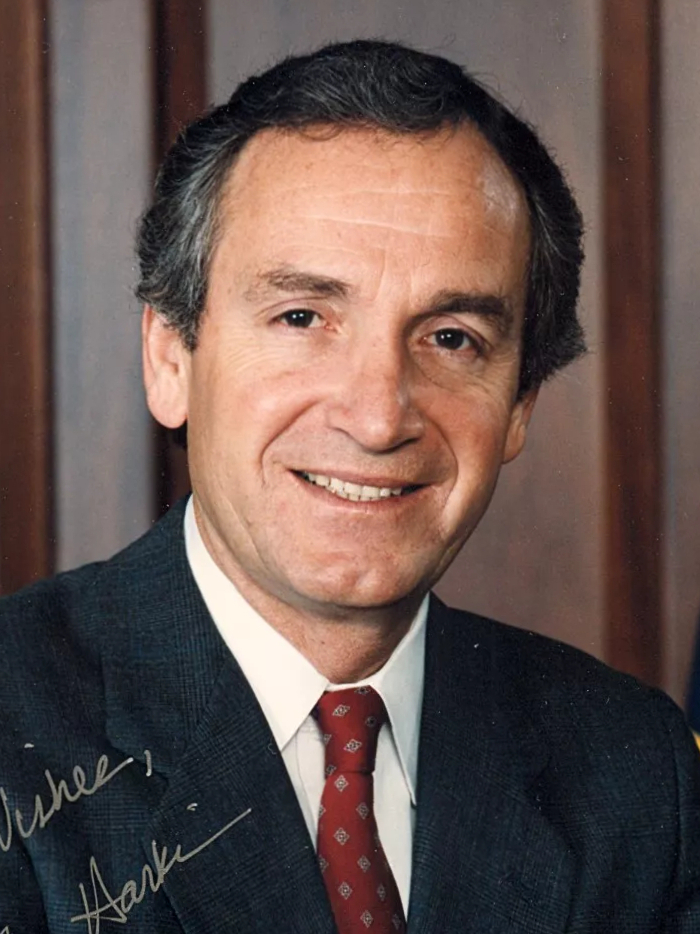

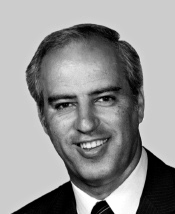
Nominee	Tom Harkin	Jim Ross Lightfoot
Party	Democratic	Republican
Popular vote	634,166	571,807
Percentage	51.81%	46.71%
- County results Harkin: 30-40% 40–50% 50–60% 60–70% Lightfoot: 40-50% 50-60% 60-70% 70–80% 80-90%
U.S. senator before election
Tom Harkin
Democratic
Elected U.S. Senator
Tom Harkin
Democratic

Incumbent Democrat Tom Harkin sought re-election to a third term unopposed in the Democratic primary, and he was challenged by Congressman Jim Ross Lightfoot from Iowa's 3rd congressional district, who won the Republican primary over Maggie Tinsman. Lightfoot had won the Republican primary against two opponents, while Harkin had won his primary uncontested, so both moved on to the general election, where they engaged in a toughly-fought campaign. Ultimately, Harkin was successful in his bid, and defeated Lightfoot, albeit by the thinnest margin of his career — 5.1 points.

Democratic primary
Party	Candidate	Votes	%
Democratic	Tom Harkin (incumbent)	98,737	99.19%
Democratic	Write-ins	810	0.81%
Total votes		99,547	100.00%

Republican primary
Party	Candidate	Votes	%
Republican	Jim Ross Lightfoot	101,608	61.48%
Republican	Maggie Tinsman	40,955	24.78%
Republican	Steve Grubbs	22,554	13.65%
Republican	Write-ins	153	0.09%
Total votes		165,270	100.00%

Iowa general election
Party	Candidate	Votes	%	±%
Democratic	Tom Harkin (incumbent)	634,166	51.81%	−2.66%
Republican	James Ross Lightfoot	571,807	46.71%	+1.30%
Independent	Sue Atkinson	9,768	0.80%	
Natural Law	Fred Gratzon	4,248	0.35%	
Independent	Joe Sulentic	1,941	0.16%	
Socialist Workers	Shirley E. Pena	1,844	0.15%	
Write-ins		280	0.02%	
Majority		62,359	5.09%	−3.96%
Turnout		1,224,054		
Democratic hold		Swing		

== Kansas ==
Due to the resignation of Bob Dole, who was campaigning for the presidential election, there were two elections in Kansas, as both seats were up for election.

=== Kansas (regular) ===
Kansas election
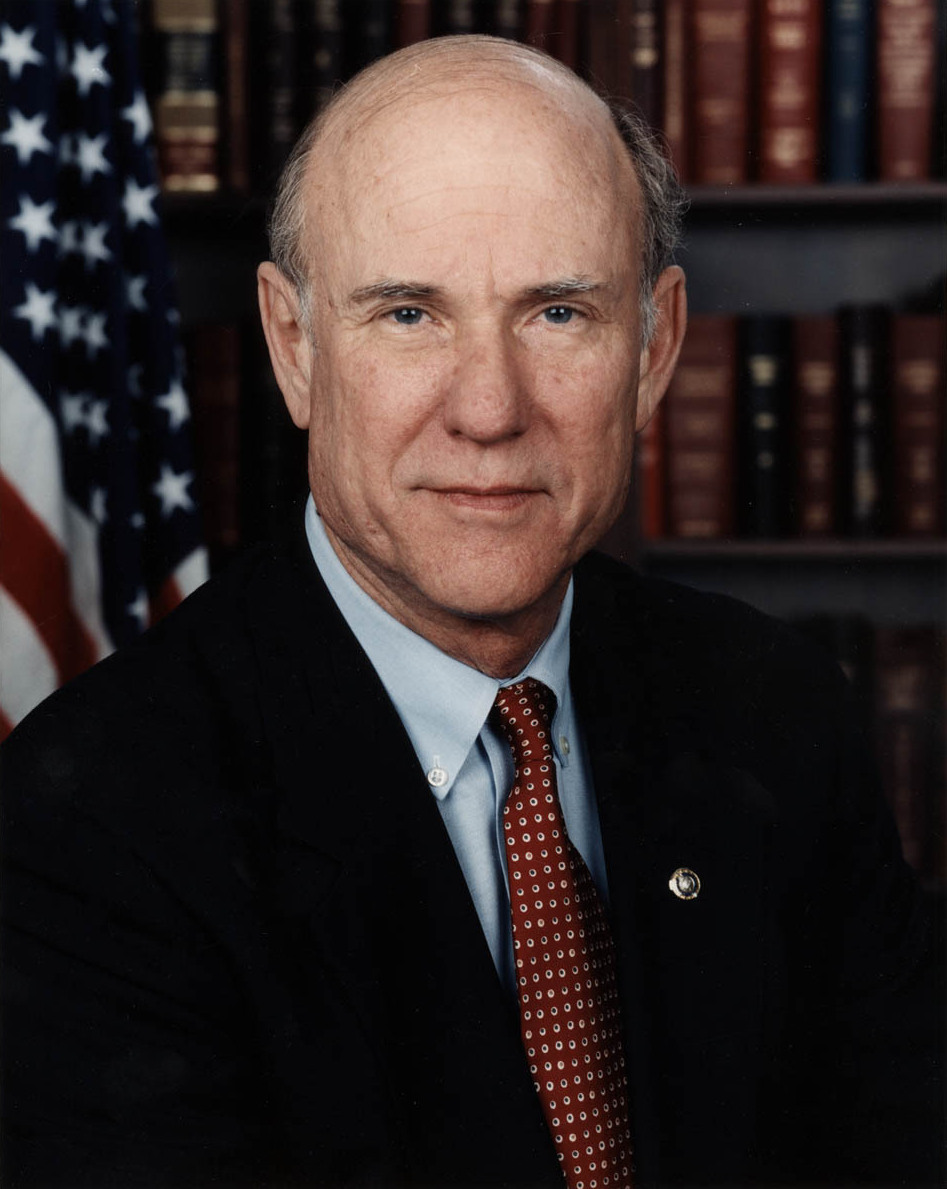

Nominee	Pat Roberts	Sally Thompson
Party	Republican	Democratic
Popular vote	652,677	362,380
Percentage	62.0%	34.4%
- County results Roberts: 40-50% 50-60% 60-70% 70-80% 80-90% Thompson: 60–70%
U.S. senator before election
Nancy Kassebaum
Republican
Elected U.S. Senator
Pat Roberts
Republican

Incumbent Republican Nancy Kassebaum decided to retire instead of seeking a fourth term. Republican Pat Roberts won the open seat, beating the Democratic Kansas State Treasurer Sally Thompson. Thompson faced no primary opposition, while Roberts faced token opposition.

Term limits were an issue during the campaign; while Roberts said that he was not totally opposed to term limits, he was wary of limits that did not apply to current members of Congress, saying that the proposed limits should apply to everyone. While Thompson signed the national term limits pledge from the group Americans for Limited Terms, Roberts declined to do so, becoming the only major party candidate for the U.S. Senate in the 1996 elections to not sign the pledge. However, he did say that "I plan only to serve two terms in the U.S. Senate." In 2014, he was elected to a fourth term in office.

Democratic Party primary
Party	Candidate	Votes	%
Democratic	Sally Thompson	121,476	100.00%
Total votes		121,476	100.00%

Republican primary
Party	Candidate	Votes	%
Republican	Pat Roberts	245,411	78.21%
Republican	Tom Little	25,052	7.98%
Republican	Tom Oyler	23,266	7.42%
Republican	Richard L. Cooley	20,060	6.39%
Total votes		313,789	100.00%

General election
Party	Candidate	Votes	%	±%
Republican	Pat Roberts	652,677	62.02%	−11.57%
Democratic	Sally Thompson	362,380	34.44%	+8.05%
Reform	Mark S. Marney	24,145	2.29%	
Libertarian	Steven Rosile	13,098	1.25%	
Majority		290,297	27.59%	−19.61%
Turnout		1,052,300		
Republican hold		Swing		

=== Kansas (special) ===
Kansas special election
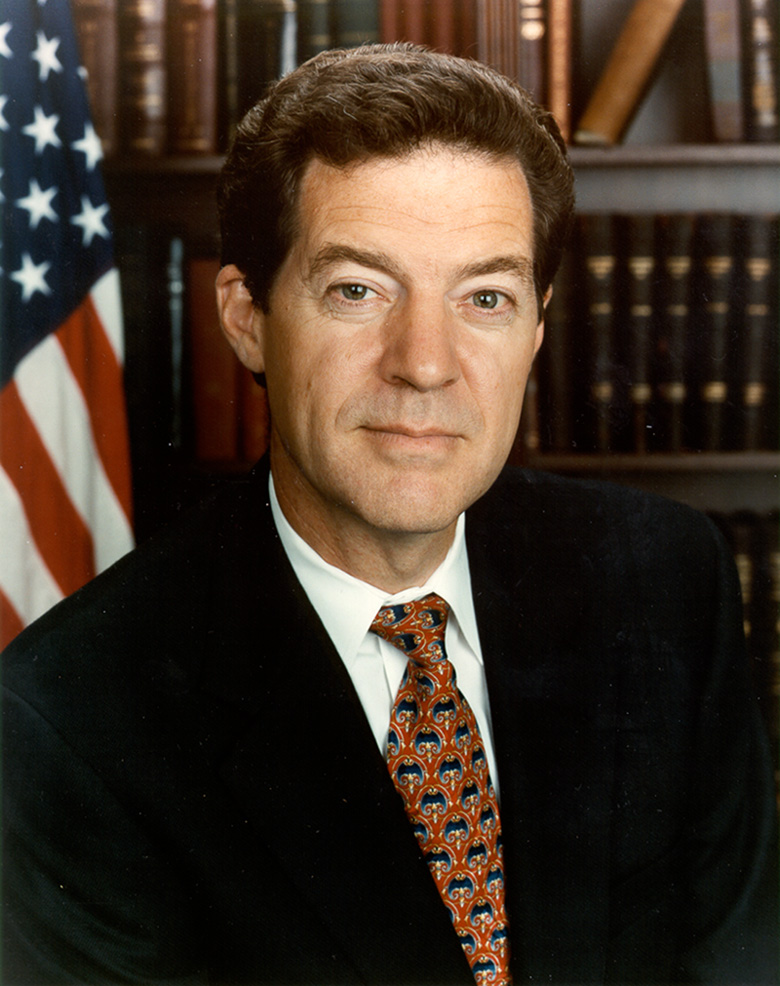

Nominee	Sam Brownback	Jill Docking
Party	Republican	Democratic
Popular vote	574,021	461,344
Percentage	53.9%	43.3%
- County results Brownback: 40–50% 50–60% 60–70% 70–80% Docking: 50–60% 60–70%
U.S. senator before election
Sheila Frahm
Republican
Elected U.S. Senator
Sam Brownback
Republican

Incumbent Republican Sheila Frahm, who was recently appointed to the seat, was defeated in the primary by Sam Brownback, who went on to win the general election by ten points over Jill Docking, businesswoman and daughter-in-law of former Kansas Governor Robert Docking, who herself had defeated Joan Finney in the Democratic primary. Brownback would remain in office until 2011, when he retired to successfully run for governor of Kansas in 2010.

Democratic primary
Party	Candidate	Votes	%
Democratic	Jill Docking	127,012	74.39%
Democratic	Joan Finney	43,726	25.61%
Total votes		170,738	100.00%

Republican primary
Party	Candidate	Votes	%
Republican	Sam Brownback	187,914	54.82%
Republican	Sheila Frahm (incumbent)	142,487	41.57%
Republican	Christina Campbell-Cline	12,378	3.61%
Total votes		342,779	100.00%

General election
Party	Candidate	Votes	%	±%
Republican	Sam Brownback	574,021	53.91%	−8.78%
Democratic	Jill Docking	461,344	43.33%	+12.30%
Reform	Donald R. Klaassen	29,351	2.76%	
Majority		112,677	10.58%	−21.08%
Turnout		1,064,716		
Republican hold		Swing		

== Kentucky ==
Kentucky election
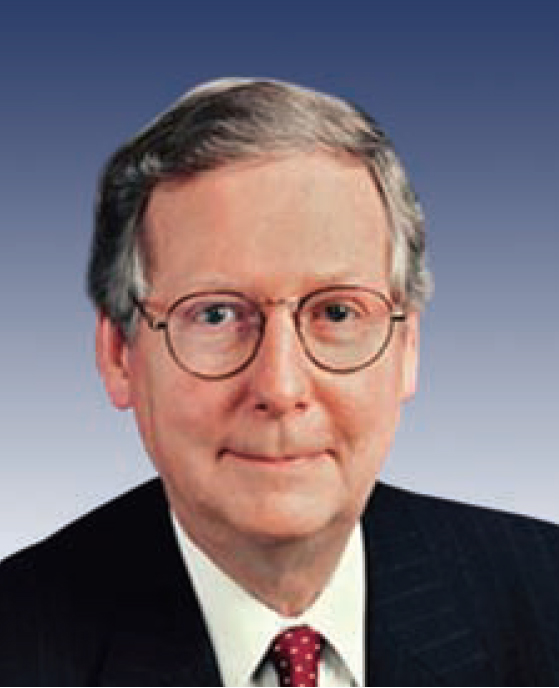

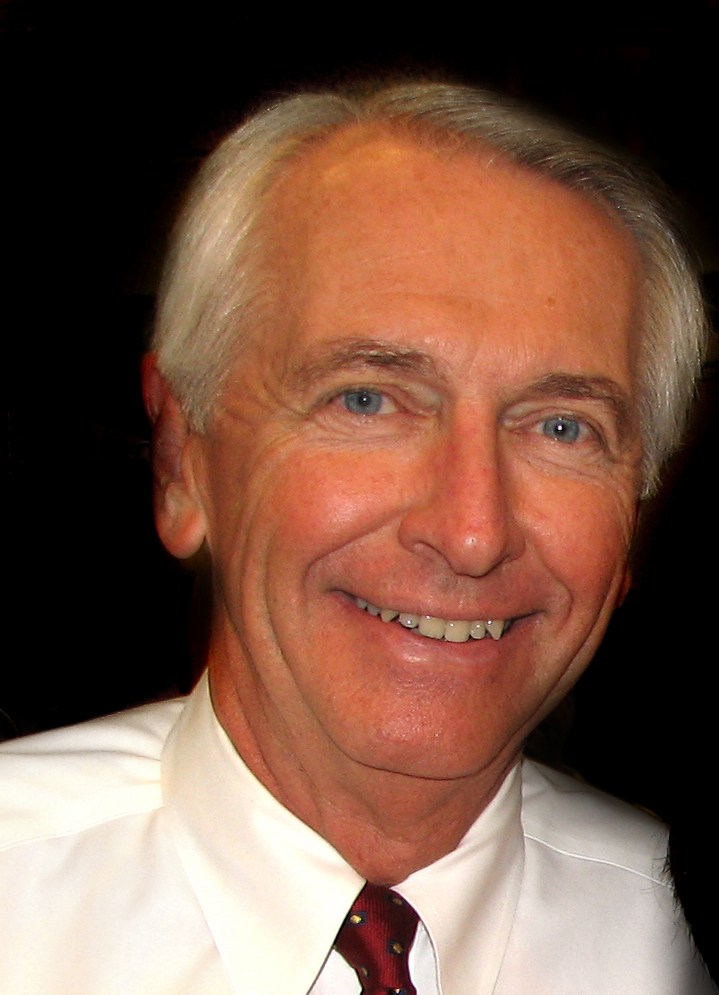
Nominee	Mitch McConnell	Steve Beshear
Party	Republican	Democratic
Popular vote	724,794	560,012
Percentage	55.5%	42.9%
- County results McConnell: 40–50% 50–60% 60–70% 70–80% 80–90% Beshear: 40–50% 50–60% 60–70% 70–80%
U.S. senator before election
Mitch McConnell
Republican
Elected U.S. Senator
Mitch McConnell
Republican

Incumbent Republican Mitch McConnell won re-nomination over Tommy Klein and then won re-election to a third term with a 12.6% margin of victory over Steve Beshear, a former lieutenant governor, who had defeated Tom Barlow in the Democratic primary. McConnell's landslide victory occurred at the same time that President Bill Clinton was re-elected to a second term, winning by a 7.5% margin nationwide, but carrying Kentucky by a 0.9% margin.

Democratic primary
Party	Candidate	Votes	%
Democratic	Steve Beshear	177,859	66.38%
Democratic	Tom Barlow	64,235	23.97%
Democratic	Shelby Lanier	25,856	9.65%
Total votes		267,950	100.00%

Republican primary
Party	Candidate	Votes	%
Republican	Mitch McConnell (incumbent)	88,620	88.59%
Republican	Tommy Klein	11,410	11.41%
Total votes		72,373	100.00%

In 1996, Beshear started out trailing against McConnell, with an early general election poll placing McConnell ahead of Beshear 50% to 32%. The campaign ultimately became quite harsh, with the McConnell campaign sending "Hunt Man," a take off of Chicken George dressed in "the red velvet coat, jodhpurs, black riding boots and black helmet of a patrician fox hunter." This was done as a means of criticizing Beshear's membership in a fox hunting club in Lexington, and undercut the Beshear campaign's message that McConnell was a Republican in the mold of Newt Gingrich and that Beshear was the only friend of the working class in the race. Beshear did not make much traction with the electorate during the campaign. By October 1996, Beshear had narrowed the gap between himself and McConnell slightly, with McConnell leading Beshear 50% to 38%. Beshear was later elected governor in 2007.

General election
Party	Candidate	Votes	%	±%
Republican	Mitch McConnell (incumbent)	724,794	55.45%	+3.27%
Democratic	Steve Beshear	560,012	42.85%	−4.97%
Libertarian	Dennis L. Lacy	8,595	0.66%	
Natural Law	Patricia Jo Metten	8,344	0.64%	
U.S. Taxpayers	Mac Elroy	5,284	0.40%	
Write-ins		17	0.00%	
Majority		164,782	12.61%	+8.23%
Turnout		1,307,046		
Republican hold		Swing		

== Louisiana ==
Louisiana election
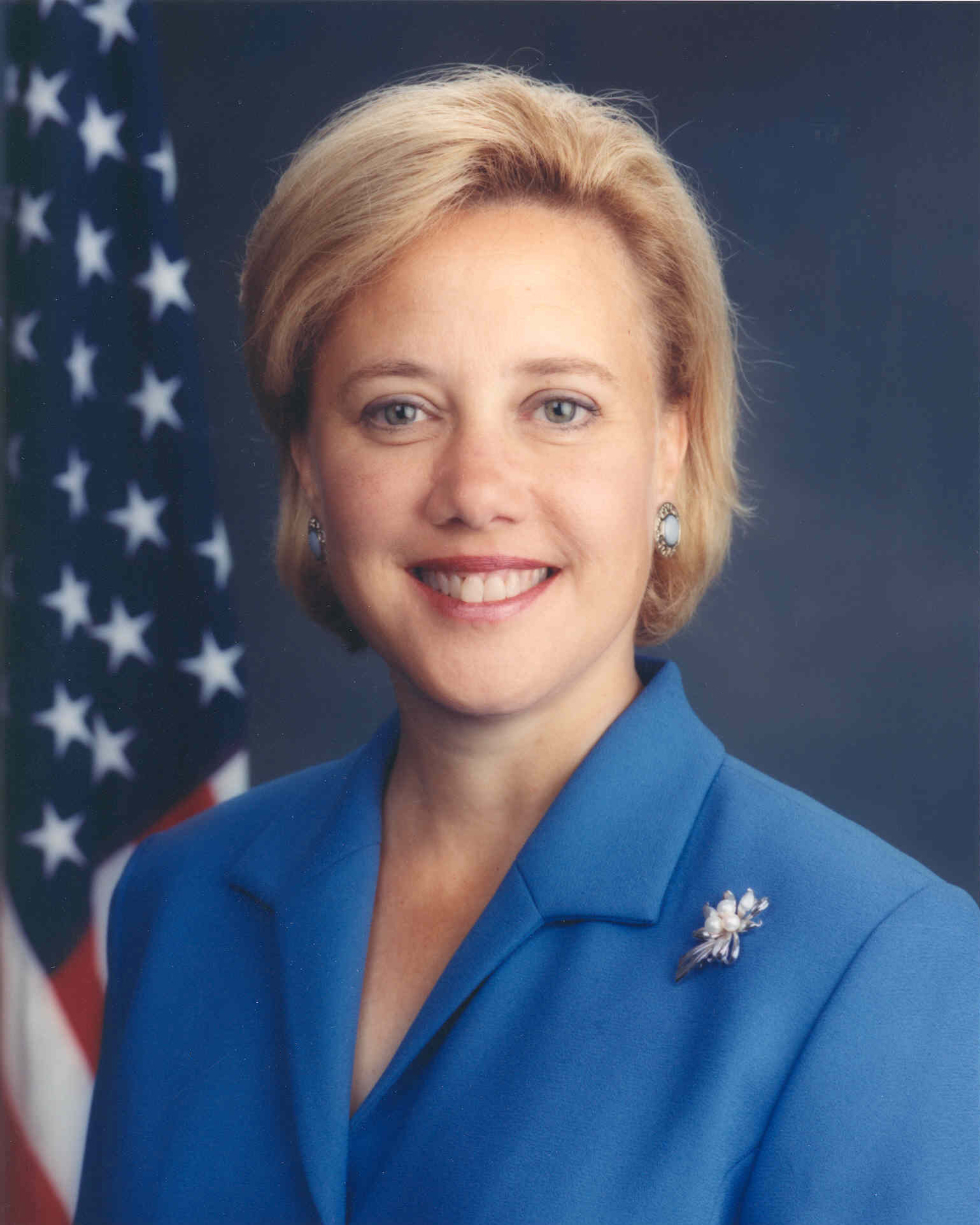

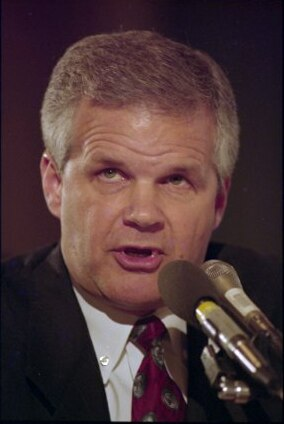
Nominee	Mary Landrieu	Woody Jenkins
Party	Democratic	Republican
Popular vote	852,945	847,157
Percentage	50.17%	49.83%
- Parish results Landrieu: 50–60% 60–70% 70–80% Jenkins: 50–60% 60–70%
U.S. senator before election
J. Bennett Johnston
Democratic
Elected U.S. Senator
Mary Landrieu
Democratic

Incumbent Democrat J. Bennett Johnston chose to retire. After the jungle primary election, state treasurer Mary Landrieu went into a runoff election with State Representative Woody Jenkins of Baton Rouge, a former Democrat who had turned Republican two years earlier. She prevailed by 5,788 votes out of 1.7 million cast, the narrowest national result of the thirty-three races for the U.S. Senate that year and one of the closest election margins in Louisiana history. At the same time, Democrat Bill Clinton carried Louisiana by a considerable margin of 927,837 votes to 712,586 cast for Republican Bob Dole.

The multi-candidate field for the primary included Democratic state Attorney General Richard Ieyoub and the former Ku Klux Klan leader, David Duke, running again as a Republican. Among the minor candidates was Peggy Wilson, an at-large member of the New Orleans City Council, and Troyce Guice, who had sought the same seat thirty years earlier when it was held by the veteran Senator Allen J. Ellender.

Louisiana United States Senate jungle primary election, September 21, 1996
Party	Candidate	Votes	%
Republican	Woody Jenkins	322,244	26.23%
Democratic	Mary Landrieu	264,268	21.51%
Democratic	Richard Ieyoub	250,682	20.41%
Republican	David Duke	141,489	11.52%
Republican	Jimmy Hayes	71,699	5.84%
Republican	Bill Linder	58,243	4.74%
Republican	Chuck McMains	45,164	3.68%
Republican	Peggy Wilson	31,877	2.60%
Democratic	Troyce Guice	15,277	1.24%
Independent	Nicholas J. Accardo	10,035	0.82%
Independent	Arthur D. "Jim" Nichols	7,894	0.64%
Democratic	Sadie Roberts-Joseph	4,660	0.38%
Independent	Tom Kirk	1,987	0.16%
Independent	Darryl Paul Ward	1,770	0.14%
Independent	Sam Houston Melton, Jr.	1,270	0.10%
Turnout		1,228,559	100.00%

1996 Louisiana United States Senate election
Party	Candidate	Votes	%	±%
Democratic	Mary Landrieu	852,945	50.17%	−3.78%
Republican	Woody Jenkins	847,157	49.83%	+6.35%
Majority		5,788	0.34%	−10.13%
Turnout		1,700,102		
Democratic hold		Swing		

Jenkins refused to concede and charged massive election fraud, orchestrated by the Democratic political organization of New Orleans, provided Landrieu's narrow margin of victory. He took his case to the Republican-controlled U.S. Senate and petitioned for Landrieu's unseating pending a new election. In a hearing, carried live by C-SPAN, the Senate Rules Committee in a party-line 8–7 vote agreed to investigate the charges. The decision briefly placed Landrieu's status in the U.S. Senate under a cloud.

Only a month into the probe, however, it emerged that Thomas "Papa Bear" Miller, a detective hired by Jenkins to investigate claims of fraud, had coached witnesses to claim they had participated in election fraud. Three witnesses claimed Miller had paid them to claim that they had either cast multiple votes for Landrieu or drove vans of illegal voters across town. The others told such bizarre tales that FBI agents dismissed their claims out of hand. It also emerged that Miller had several felony convictions on his record, including a guilty plea to attempted murder. The Democrats walked out of the probe in protest, but the probe continued.

The investigation dragged on for over ten months, angering the Democrats and exacerbating partisan friction in the day-to-day sessions of the Senate Agriculture, Nutrition and Forestry Committee to which Landrieu was assigned as a freshman member of the 105th Congress. Finally, in October 1997, the Rules Committee concluded that while there were major electoral irregularities, none of them were serious enough to burden Louisiana with a new election at that stage. It recommended that the results stand.

The Landrieu-Jenkins contest was not the only U.S. Senate election in 20th century Louisiana in which the results were hotly disputed. Future Senator John H. Overton claimed the renomination and hence reelection of Senator Joseph E. Ransdell was tainted by fraud. In 1932, Senator Edwin S. Broussard claimed that his primary defeat by Overton was fraudulent. In both cases, the Senate seated the certified winners, Ransdell and Overton, respectively.

== Maine ==
Maine election
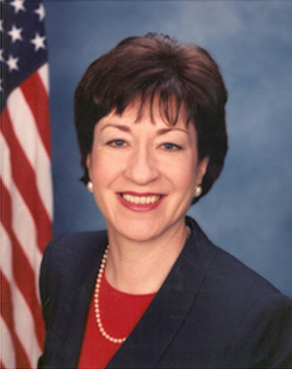

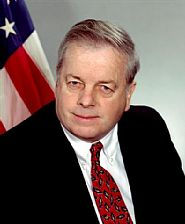
Nominee	Susan Collins	Joseph E. Brennan
Party	Republican	Democratic
Popular vote	298,422	266,226
Percentage	49.18%	43.88%
- County results Collins: 40–50% 50–60% Brennan: 40–50%
U.S. senator before election
William Cohen
Republican
Elected U.S. Senator
Susan Collins
Republican

Incumbent Republican William Cohen decided to retire instead of seeking a fourth term. To replace him, Congressman and former governor of Maine Joseph E. Brennan won the Democratic primary over Sean Faircloth and Richard A. Spencer, while political consultant and 1994 nominee for governor of Maine Susan Collins won the Republican primary over W. John Hathaway. A competitive general election ensued, but Collins ultimately won out over Brennan, keeping the seat in the Republican column. With Collins's election to the Senate in 1996, Maine became only the second state after California to have two sitting women senators.

Democratic primary
Party	Candidate	Votes	%
Democratic	Joseph Brennan	48,335	56.68%
Democratic	Sean Faircloth	21,204	24.87%
Democratic	Richard A. Spencer	10,236	12.00%
Democratic	Jean Hay Bright	4,524	5.31%
Democratic	Jerald Leonard	939	1.10%
Democratic	Write-ins	35	0.04%
Total votes		85,273	100.00%

Republican primary
Party	Candidate	Votes	%
Republican	Susan Collins	53,339	55.50%
Republican	W. John Hathaway	29,792	31.00%
Republican	Robert A. G. Monks	12,943	13.47%
Republican	Write-ins	33	0.03%
Total votes		96,107	100.00%

Maine general election
Party	Candidate	Votes	%	±%
Republican	Susan Collins	298,422	49.18%	−12.16%
Democratic	Joseph E. Brennan	266,226	43.88%	+5.24%
Independent	John C. Rensenbrink	23,441	3.86%	
Constitution	William P. Clarke	18,618	3.07%	
Write-ins		70	0.01%	
Majority		32,196	5.31%	−17.39%
Turnout		606,777		
Republican hold		Swing		

== Massachusetts ==
Massachusetts election
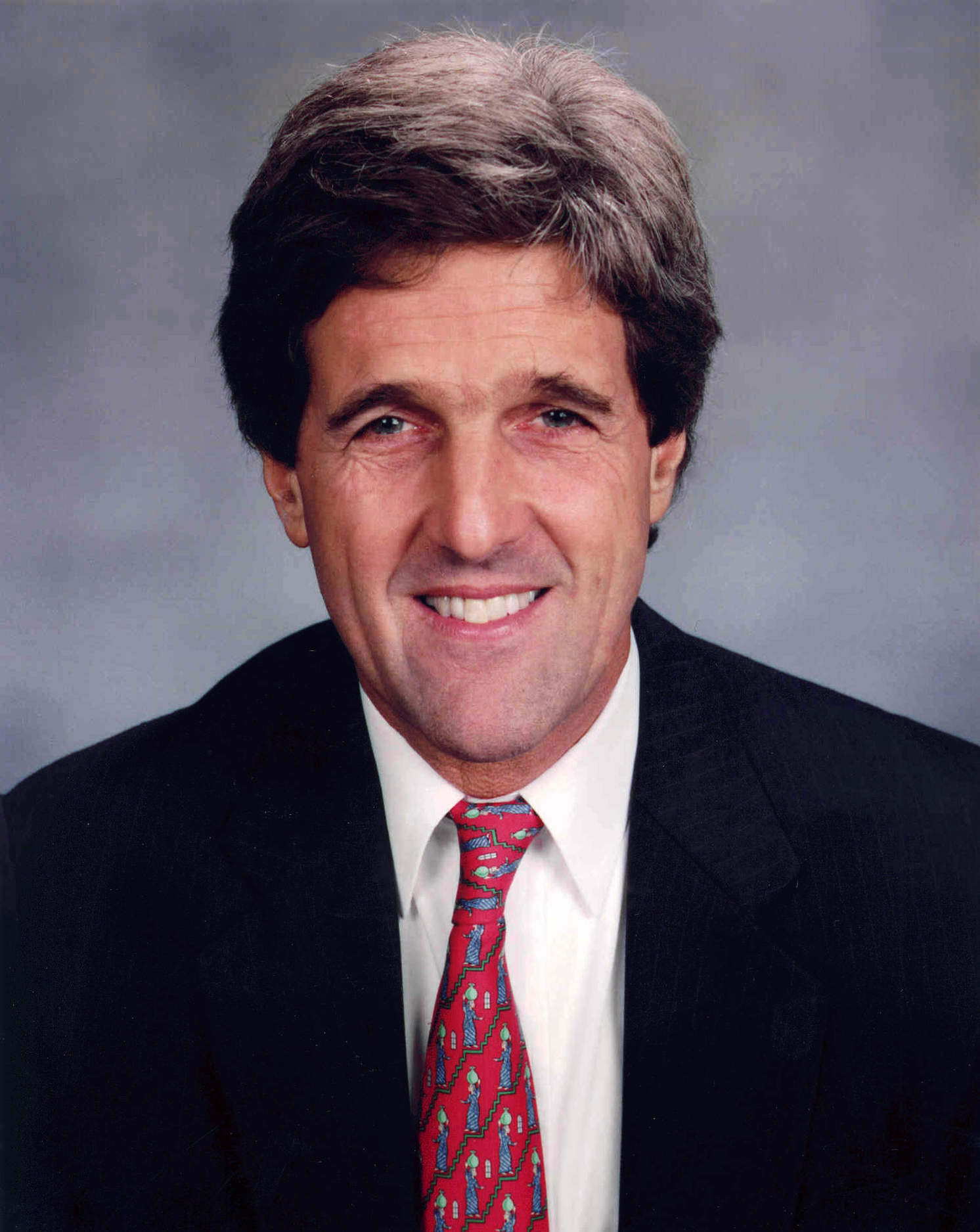

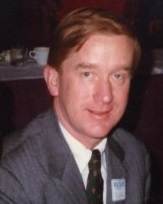
Nominee	John Kerry	Bill Weld
Party	Democratic	Republican
Popular vote	1,334,135	1,143,120
Percentage	52.2%	44.7%

Kerry
40–50%
50–60%
60–70%
70–80%
Weld
40–50%
50–60%
60–70%
70–80%
U.S. senator before election
John Kerry
Democratic
Elected U.S. Senator
John Kerry
Democratic

Incumbent Democrat John Kerry won re-election to a third term over the Republican governor of Massachusetts,

On November 29, 1995, Governor Bill Weld announced his candidacy for the Senate seat occupied by U.S. Senator Kerry with a formal announcement on March 27, 1996. Kerry's previous two opponents in 1984 and 1990 had no prior elected office experience. The election was one of many competitive senate elections in 1996.

At the federal level, Democrats controlled both U.S. Senate seats and eight of ten U.S. House seats. No Republican won a senate election since 1972. In the 1984 presidential election, President Ronald Reagan won 49 of 50 states, with Massachusetts being his worst performance (excluding Walter Mondale's home-state of Minnesota. Reagan carried the state with just 51% of the vote. In 1994, incumbent Democrat Ted Kennedy won re-election against businessman Mitt Romney with just 58% of the vote, the lowest percentage since his first senate election campaign in 1962.

The first debate between Weld and Kerry was held in Faneuil Hall on April 8 with a second debate held on June 3. A third debate was held at the Emerson Majestic Theater on July 2. The Weld and Kerry campaigns agreed to eight debates and a spending cap of $6.9 million negotiated at Senator Kerry's Beacon Hill home on August 7; Senator Kerry later mortgaged his house to raise funds in October. On the same day the spending cap was agreed upon, Governor Weld jumped into the Charles River. He later spoke at the 1996 Republican National Convention on August 14 before debating U.S. Senator Kerry again on August 19. Senator Kerry spoke at the 1996 Democratic National Convention and debated Governor Weld again on September 16.

General election
Party	Candidate	Votes	%
Democratic	John Kerry (incumbent)	1,334,135	52.20%
Republican	William Weld	1,143,120	44.72%
Conservative	Susan C. Gallagher	70,007	2.74%
Natural Law	Robert C. Stowe	7,169	0.28%
	All others	1,511	0.06%
Turnout		2,555,942	
Democratic hold			

== Michigan ==
Michigan election
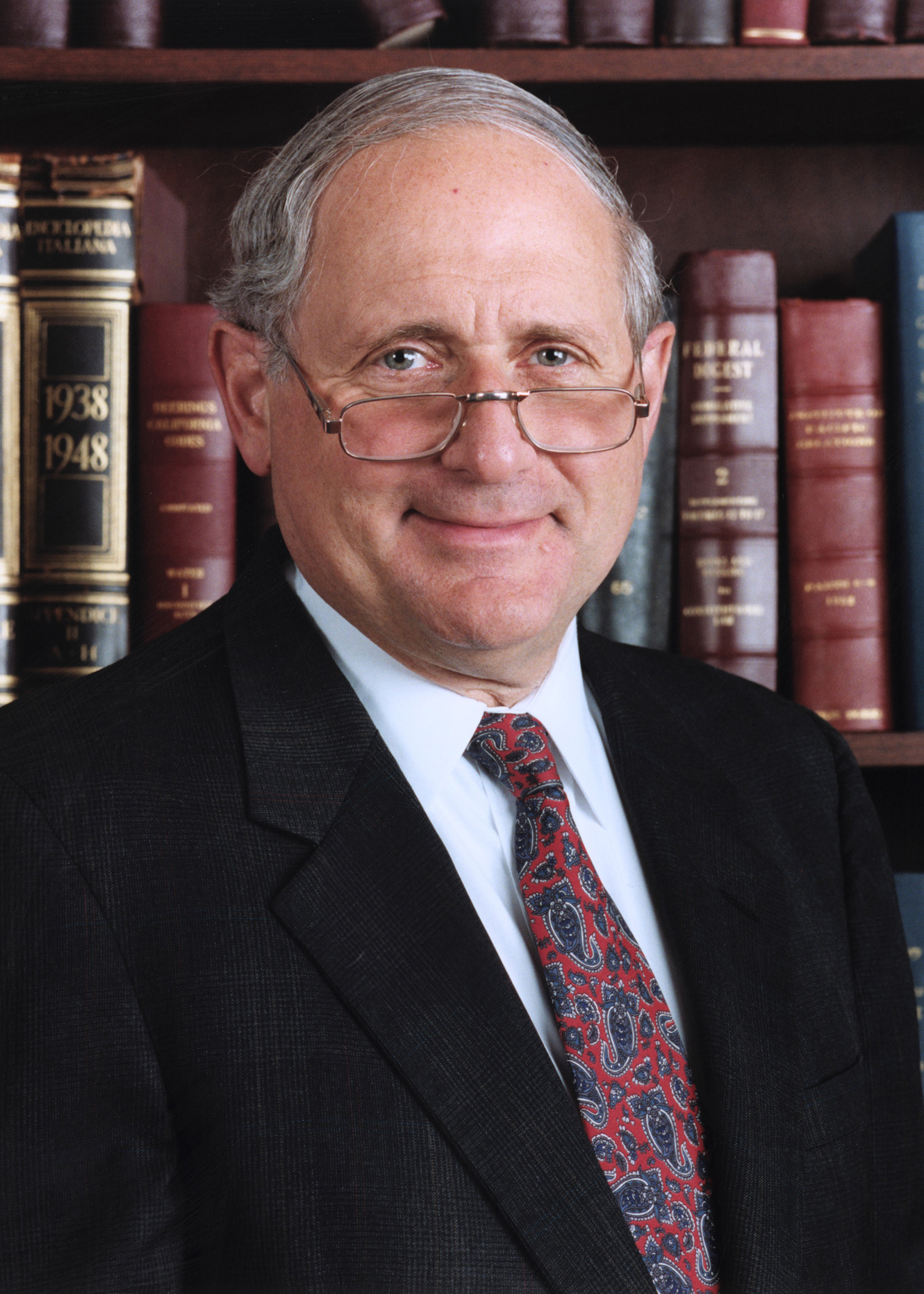

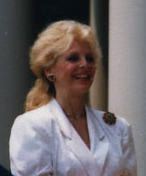
Nominee	Carl Levin	Ronna Romney
Party	Democratic	Republican
Popular vote	2,195,738	1,500,106
Percentage	58.4%	39.9%
- County results Levin: 40–50% 50–60% 60–70% 70–80% Romney: 40–50% 50–60% 60–70%
U.S. senator before election
Carl Levin
Democratic
Elected U.S. Senator
Carl Levin
Democratic

Incumbent Democrat Carl Levin won re-election to a fourth term over Ronna Romney radio talk show host and former daughter-in-law of Michigan governor George W. Romney. Both ran unopposed in the primary.

General election
Party	Candidate	Votes	%
Democratic	Carl Levin (incumbent)	2,195,738	58.4%
Republican	Ronna Romney	1,500,106	39.9%
Libertarian	Kenneth L. Proctor	36,911	1.0%
Workers World	William Roundtree	12,235	0.3%
Natural Law	Joseph S. Mattingly	11,306	0.3%
Socialist	Martin P. McLaughlin	5,975	0.1%
Majority		695,632	18.5%
Turnout		3,763,371	100.00%
Democratic hold			

== Minnesota ==
Minnesota election

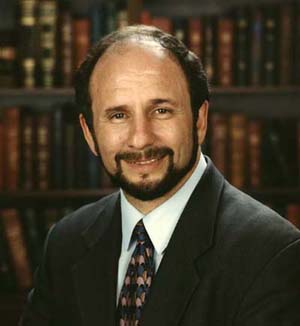

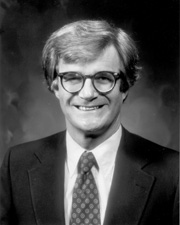

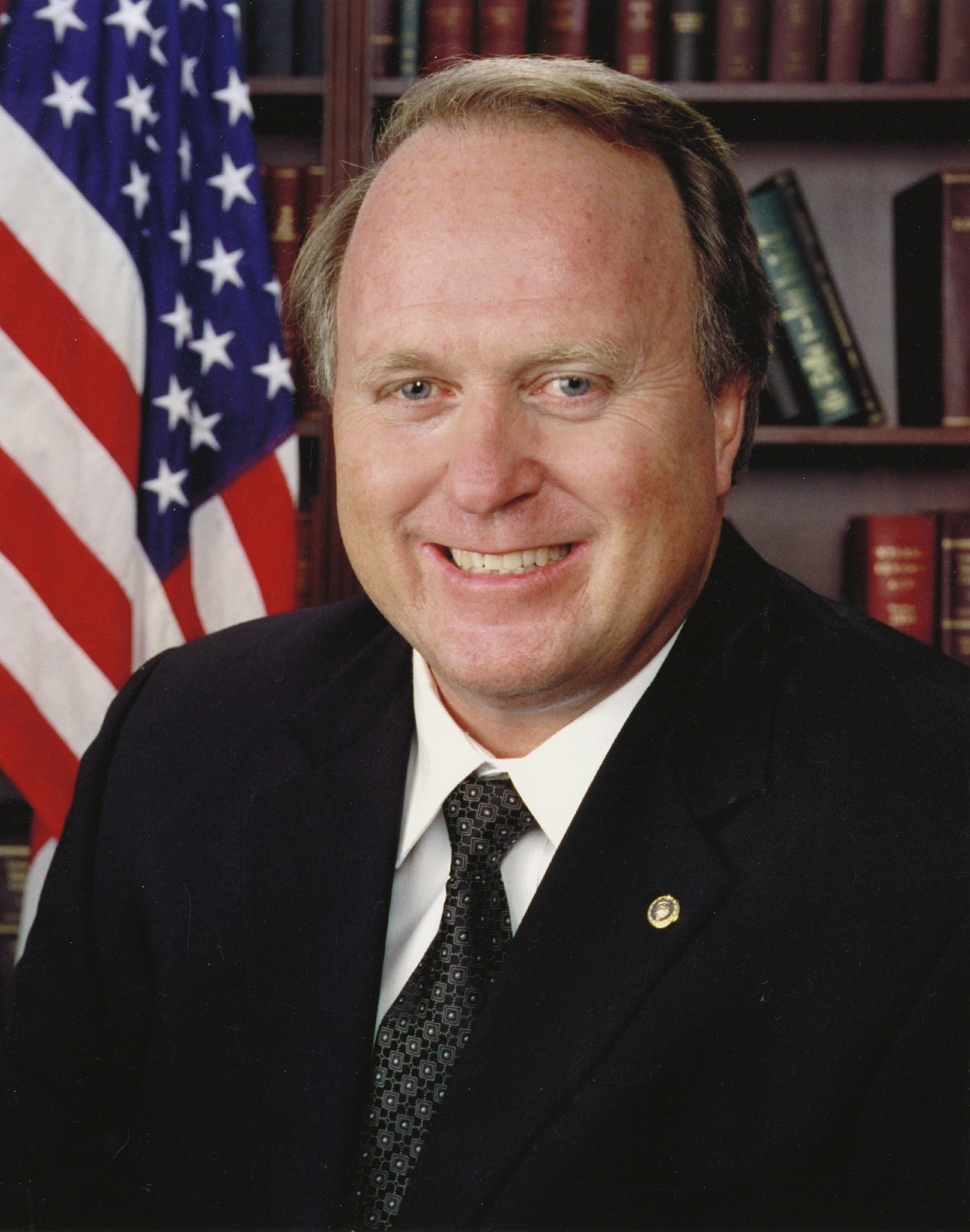
Nominee	Paul Wellstone	Rudy Boschwitz
Party	Democratic (DFL)	Republican
Popular vote	1,098,430	901,194
Percentage	50.3%	41.3%
Nominee	Dean Barkley
Party	Reform
Popular vote	152,328
Percentage	7.0%
- Wellstone: 40–50% 50–60% 60–70% Boschwitz: 30–40% 40–50% 50–60%
U.S. senator before election
Paul Wellstone
Democratic (DFL)
Elected U.S. Senator
Paul Wellstone
Democratic (DFL)

Incumbent Democrat Paul Wellstone won re-nomination in a landslide, and he faced Republican Rudy Boschwitz, who had also handily won the Republican nomination in the general election. Wellstone won re-election to a second term with a majority, though he would die before his term expired.

Democratic–Farmer–Labor primary
Party	Candidate	Votes	%
Democratic (DFL)	Paul Wellstone	194,699	86.41%
Democratic (DFL)	Richard Franson	16,465	7.31%
Democratic (DFL)	Ed Hansen	9,990	4.43%
Democratic (DFL)	Oloveuse S. Savior	4,180	1.86%
Turnout		225,334	

Republican primary
Party	Candidate	Votes	%
Republican	Rudy Boschwitz	158,678	80.59%
Republican	Stephen Young	16,324	8.29%
Republican	Bert McKasy	12,711	6.46%
Republican	Monti Moreno	6,536	3.32%
Republican	John J. Zeleniak	2,655	1.35%
Turnout		196,904	

Boschwitz filed to run a rematch against Wellstone. The incumbent was an unapologetic liberal. Rudy released ads accusing Wellstone of being "embarrassingly liberal" and calling him "Senator Welfare". Boschwitz accused Wellstone of supporting flag burning, a move that some believe possibly backfired. Like the 1990 election, Wellstone had a massive grassroots campaign which inspired college students, poor people and minorities to get involved in politics for the very first time. Prior to that accusation, Boschwitz had significantly outspent Wellstone on campaign advertising and the race was closely contested, but Wellstone went on to beat Boschwitz by a nine-point margin in a three-way race (Dean Barkley received 7%). Despite losing here, Barkley was later appointed near the end of the next term after Wellstone's 2002 death.

Minnesota general election
Party	Candidate	Votes	%
Democratic	Paul Wellstone (incumbent)	1,098,430	50.32%
Republican	Rudy Boschwitz	901,194	41.28%
Reform	Dean Barkley	152,328	6.98%
Grassroots	Tim Davis	14,139	0.65%
Libertarian	Roy Ezra Carlton	5,428	0.25%
Resource Party	Howard Hanson	4,381	0.20%
Natural Law	Steve Johnson	4,321	0.20%
Socialist Workers	Thomas A. Fiske	1,554	0.07%
Independent	Write-In	1,130	0.05%
Majority		197,236	9.04%
Total votes		2,182,905	100.00%
Democratic hold			

== Mississippi ==
Mississippi election
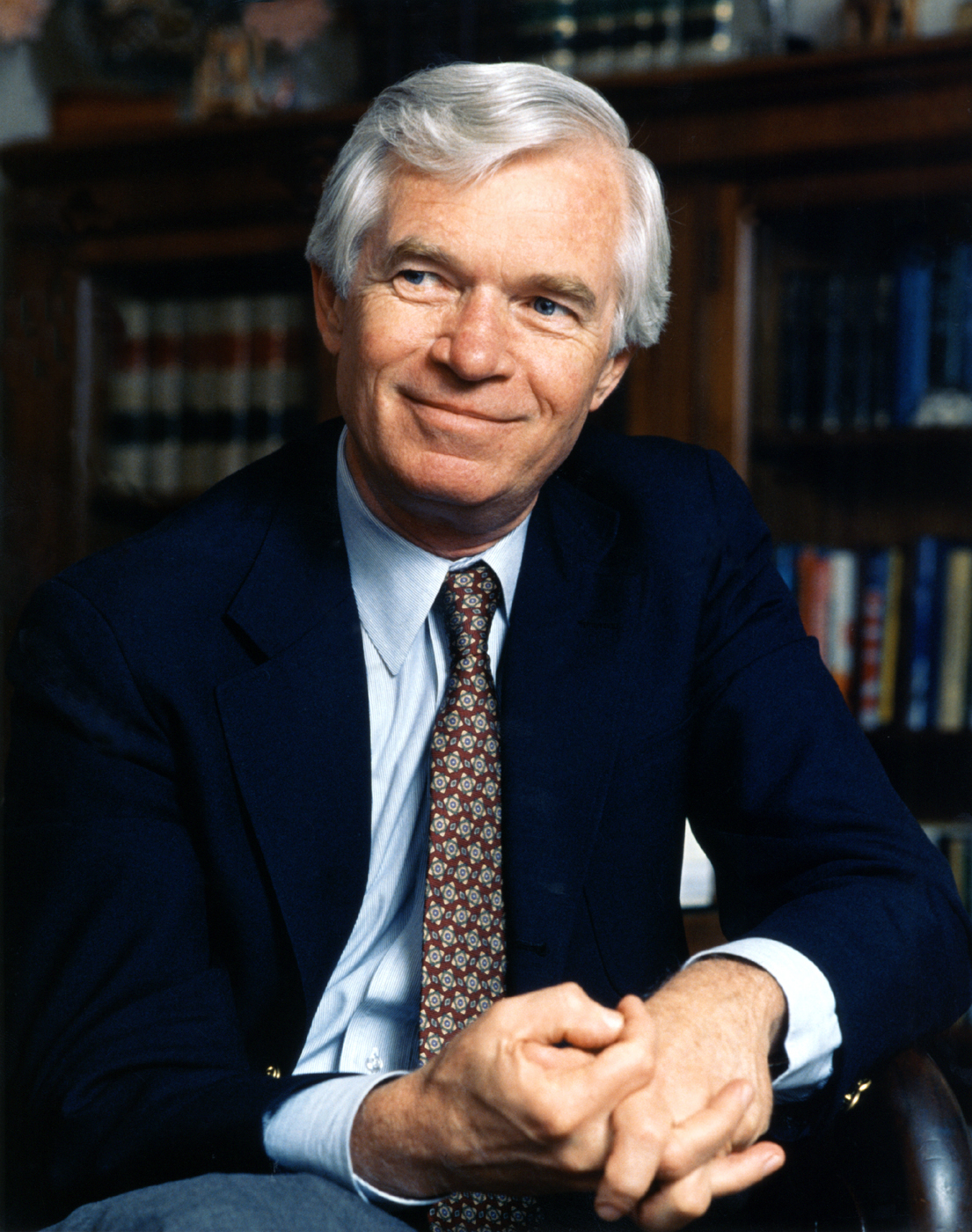

Nominee	Thad Cochran	Bootie Hunt
Party	Republican	Democratic
Popular vote	624,154	240,647
Percentage	71.0%	27.4%
- County results Cochran: 40–50% 50–60% 60–70% 70–80% 80–90% >90% Hunt: 50–60%
U.S. senator before election
Thad Cochran
Republican
Elected U.S. Senator
Thad Cochran
Republican

Incumbent Republican Thad Cochran won re-election to a fourth term, unopposed in the Republican primary, by a landslide over Democrat Bootie Hunt, who defeated Shawn O'Hara in the Democratic primary.

Mississippi general election
Party	Candidate	Votes	%
Republican	Thad Cochran (incumbent)	624,154	71.0%
Democratic	Bootie Hunt	240,647	27.4%
Independent	Ted Weill	13,861	1.6%
Majority		383,507	43.6%
Turnout		878,662	100.00%
Republican hold			

== Montana ==
Montana election
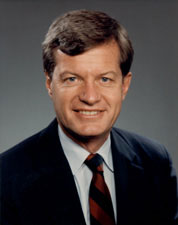

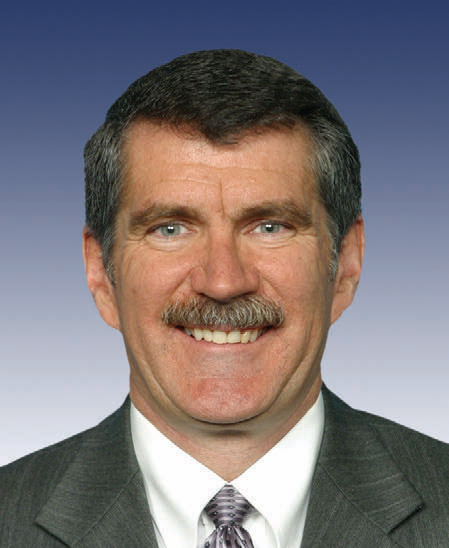
Nominee	Max Baucus	Denny Rehberg
Party	Democratic	Republican
Popular vote	201,935	182,111
Percentage	49.56%	44.69%
- County results Baucus: 40–50% 50–60% 60–70% 70–80% Rehberg: 40–50% 50–60% 60–70% 70–80%
U.S. senator before election
Max Baucus
Democratic
Elected U.S. Senator
Max Baucus
Democratic

Incumbent Democrat Max Baucus, who was first elected in 1978 and was re-elected in 1984 and 1990, ran for re-election. He was unopposed in the Democratic primary, and moved on to the general election, where he faced a stiff challenge in Denny Rehberg, the lieutenant governor of Montana and the Republican nominee, who had faced nominal opposition. Despite Bob Dole's victory over Bill Clinton and Ross Perot in the state that year in the presidential election, Baucus managed to narrowly win re-election over Rehberg to secure a fourth term in the Senate by just under five percent. Shaw and Heaton's totals were greater than Baucus's margin of victory over Rehberg. This was the closest election of Baucus's senate career, having won every other election by at least ten points.

Democratic Party primary
Party	Candidate	Votes	%
Democratic	Max Baucus (incumbent)	85,976	100.00%
Total votes		85,976	100.00%

Reform primary
Party	Candidate	Votes	%
Reform	Becky Shaw	930	68.03%
Reform	Webb Sullivan	437	31.97%
Total votes		1,367	100.00%

Republican primary
Party	Candidate	Votes	%
Republican	Denny Rehberg	82,158	73.81%
Republican	Ed Borcherdt	14,670	13.18%
Republican	John K. McDonald	14,485	13.01%
Total votes		111,313	100.00%

Montana general election
Party	Candidate	Votes	%	±%
Democratic	Max Baucus (incumbent)	201,935	49.56%	−18.57%
Republican	Denny Rehberg	182,111	44.69%	+15.31%
Reform	Becky Shaw	19,276	4.73%	
Natural Law	Stephen Heaton	4,168	1.02%	
Majority		19,824	4.86%	−33.88%
Turnout		407,490		
Democratic hold		Swing		

== Nebraska ==
Nebraska election
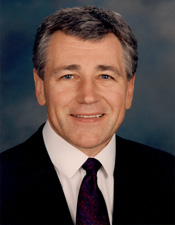

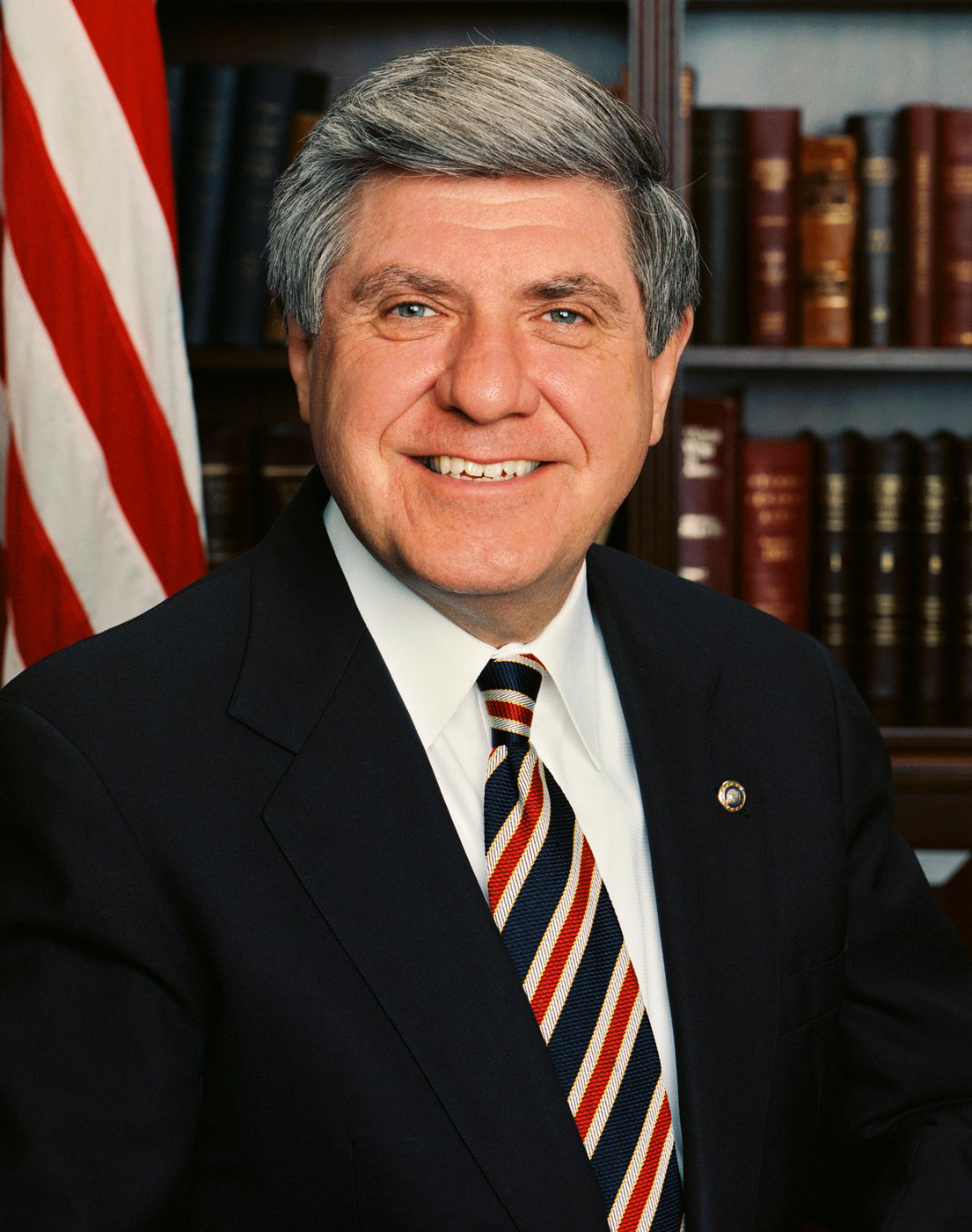
Nominee	Chuck Hagel	Ben Nelson
Party	Republican	Democratic
Popular vote	379,933	281,904
Percentage	56.1%	41.7%
- County results Hagel: 50-60% 60-70% 70-80% 80-90% Nelson: 40–50% 50–60%
U.S. senator before election
J. James Exon
Democratic
Elected U.S. Senator
Chuck Hagel
Republican

Incumbent Democrat J. James Exon decided to retire instead of seeking a fourth term. Republican businessman Chuck Hagel won the Republican primary over Nebraska Attorney General Don Stenberg. Ben Nelson, governor of Nebraska, was unopposed in the Democratic primary. Hagel won the open seat by 14 points over Nelson. Nelson would later serve alongside Hagel, being elected to the U.S. Senate in 2000.

Democratic primary
Party	Candidate	Votes	%
Democratic	Ben Nelson	93,140	97.00%
Democratic	Write-ins	2,882	3.00%
Total votes		96,022	100.00%

Republican primary
Party	Candidate	Votes	%
Republican	Chuck Hagel	112,953	62.24%
Republican	Don Stenberg	67,974	37.46%
Republican	Write-ins	544	0.30%
Total votes		181,471	100.00%

General election
Party	Candidate	Votes	%	±%
Republican	Chuck Hagel	379,933	56.14%	+15.21%
Democratic	Ben Nelson	281,904	41.65%	−17.25%
Libertarian	John DeCamp	9,483	1.40%	
Natural Law	Bill Dunn	4,806	0.71%	
Write-ins		663	0.10%	
Majority		98,029	14.48%	−3.49%
Turnout		676,958		
Republican gain from Democratic		Swing		

== New Hampshire ==
New Hampshire election
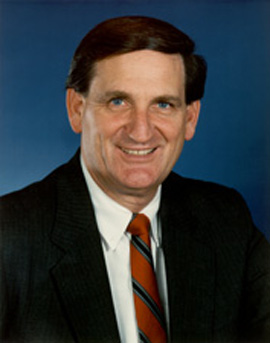

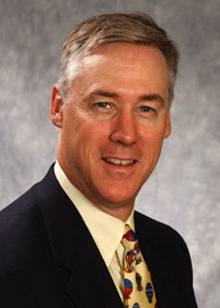
Nominee	Bob Smith	Richard Swett
Party	Republican	Democratic
Popular vote	242,304	227,397
Percentage	49.2%	46.1%
- Smith: 40–50% 50–60% 60–70% 70–80% 80–90% Swett: 40–50% 50–60% 60–70% 80–90% >90%
U.S. senator before election
Bob Smith
Republican
Elected U.S. Senator
Bob Smith
Republican

Incumbent Republican Bob Smith won re-election to a second term over Democrat Richard Swett. Both were unopposed in their respective primaries. Smith had established himself as the most conservative Senator from the Northeast, and Bill Clinton's coattails nearly caused his defeat. On the night of the election many American media networks incorrectly projected that Swett had won. Smith would lose re-nomination to John Sununu in 2002 after briefly leaving the Republican party, and Sununu would succeed him in the Senate.

General election
Party	Candidate	Votes	%
Republican	Bob Smith (incumbent)	242,304	49.2%
Democratic	Richard Swett	227,397	46.1%
Libertarian	Ken Blevens	22,265	4.5%
Majority		14,907	3.1%
Turnout		491,996	100.00%
Republican hold			

== New Jersey ==
New Jersey election
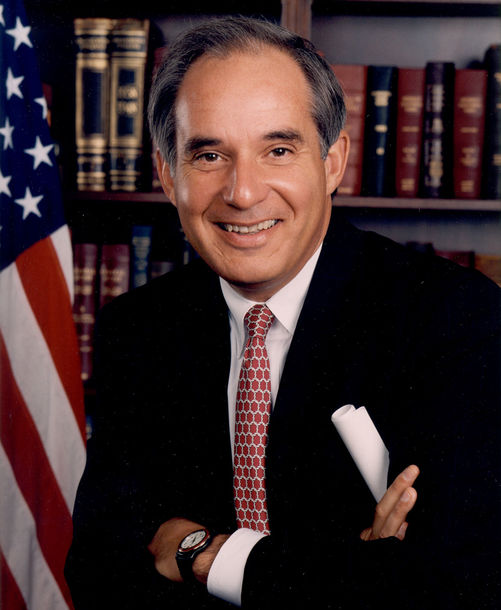

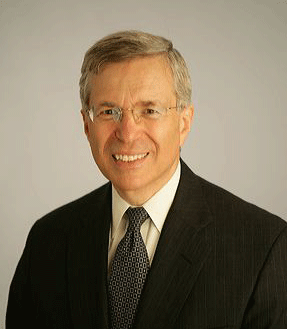
Nominee	Robert Torricelli	Dick Zimmer
Party	Democratic	Republican
Popular vote	1,519,328	1,227,817
Percentage	52.7%	42.6%
- Torricelli: 40–50% 50–60% 60–70% Zimmer: 40–50% 50–60% 60–70%
U.S. senator before election
Bill Bradley
Democratic
Elected U.S. Senator
Robert G. Torricelli
Democratic

Incumbent Democrat Bill Bradley decided to retire instead of seeking a fourth term. Democratic Congressman Robert G. Torricelli won the election, beating Republican Congressman Dick Zimmer.

Zimmer was the front-runner for the GOP nomination from the start, getting endorsements from Republican leaders across the state, including Governor Christine Todd Whitman. Both DuHaime, an anti-abortion candidate, and LaRossa, a pro-gun candidate, attempted to portray Zimmer as too liberal for the party. Zimmer treated the two challengers as if they did not exist.

Republican Primary Results
Party	Candidate	Votes	%
Republican	Dick Zimmer	144,121	68.0%
Republican	Richard DuHaime	42,155	19.9%
Republican	Dick LaRossa	25,608	12.1%

Democratic U.S. Representative Robert Torricelli easily won his party primary unopposed. Republican U.S. Representative Dick Zimmer won his party's nomination easily. Torricelli defeated Zimmer in the general election by 10 points, a margin less than President Bill Clinton, who carried New Jersey by almost 18%. Independents made up 4.8% of the vote.

Like other Democratic candidates around the country, Torricelli tried to portray "Zig-Zag Zimmer" as a clone of House Speaker Newt Gingrich and flip-flopping on his positions on issues like Medicare, gun control and an increase in the minimum wage during the campaign. Zimmer tried to cast his opponent as a tax-and-spend liberal with ethical flaws. Military morale was also a part of the campaign.

General election results
Party	Candidate	Votes	%
Democratic	Robert G. Torricelli	1,519,328	52.7%
Republican	Dick Zimmer	1,227,817	42.6%
Independent	Richard J. Pezzullo	50,971	1.8%
Independent	Paul A. Woomer	15,183	0.5%
Independent	Olga L. Rodriguez	14,319	0.5%
Independent	Mark Wise	13,683	0.5%
Independent	Wilburt Kornegay	11,107	0.4%
Independent	Steven J. Baeli	7,749	0.3%
Majority		291,511	10.1%
Turnout		2,860,157	100.0%
Democratic hold			

== New Mexico ==
New Mexico election
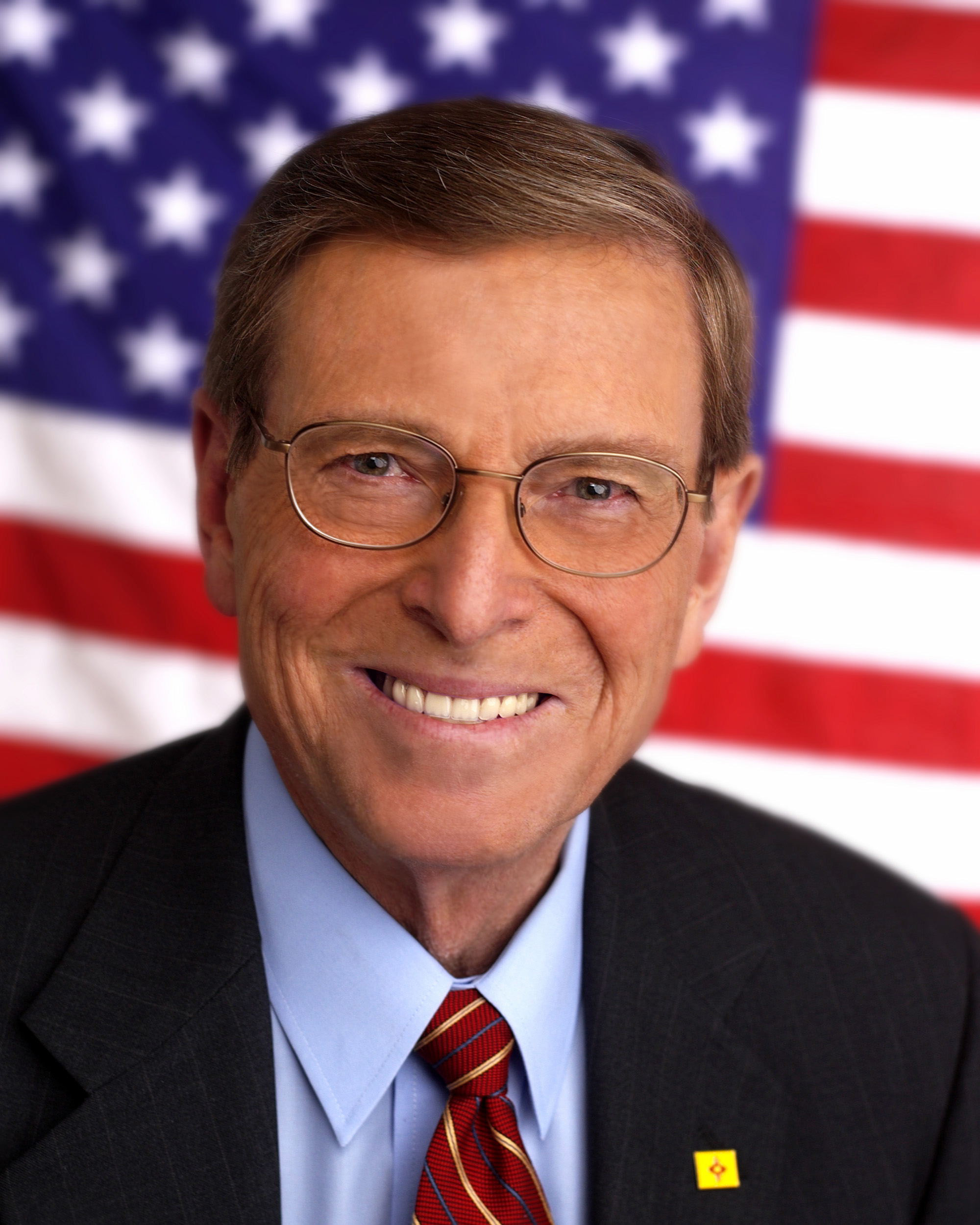

Nominee	Pete Domenici	Art Trujillo
Party	Republican	Democratic
Popular vote	357,171	164,356
Percentage	64.7%	29.8%
- County results Domenici: 50–60% 60–70% 70–80% 80–90% Trujillo: 50–60%
U.S. senator before election
Pete Domenici
Republican
Elected U.S. Senator
Pete Domenici
Republican

Incumbent Republican Pete Domenici ran for re-election to a fifth term and faced no Republican opposition. Art Trujillo defeated Eric Treisman in the Democratic primary. Domenici defeated Trujilo in a landslide, 65%-30%.

Democratic primary
Party	Candidate	Votes	%
Democratic	Art Trujillo	84,721	70.55%
Democratic	Eric Treisman	35,363	29.45%
Total votes		120,084	100.00%

Republican primary
Party	Candidate	Votes	%
Republican	Pete Domenici (incumbent)	69,394	100.00%
Total votes		69,394	100.00%

General election
Party	Candidate	Votes	%	±%
Republican	Pete Domenici (incumbent)	357,171	64.73%	−8.19%
Democratic	Art Trujillo	164,356	29.78%	+2.75%
Green	Abraham J. Gutmann	24,230	4.39%	
Libertarian	Bruce M. Bush	6,064	1.10%	
Majority		192,815	34.94%	−10.93%
Turnout		551,821		
Republican hold		Swing		

== North Carolina ==
North Carolina election
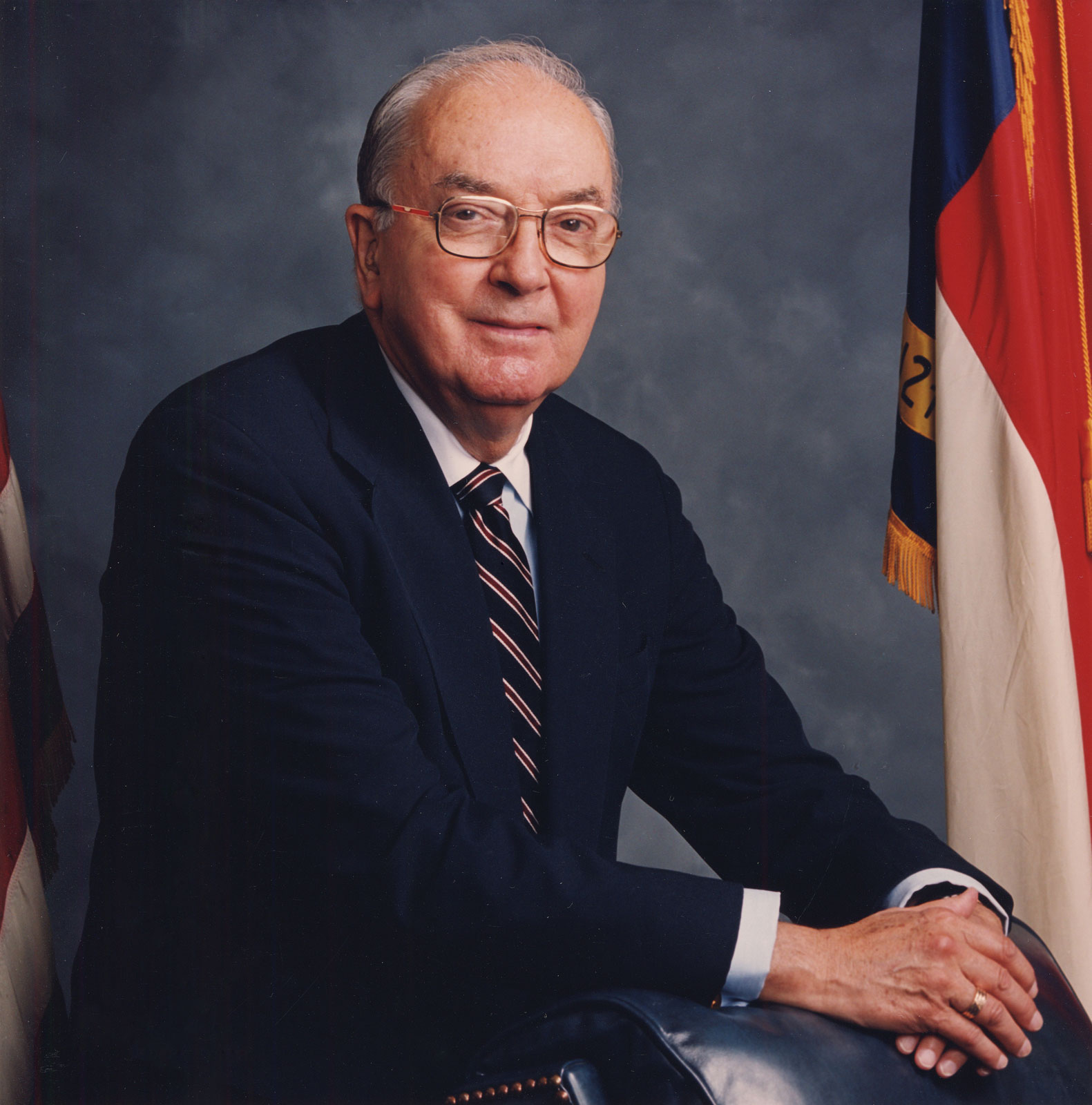

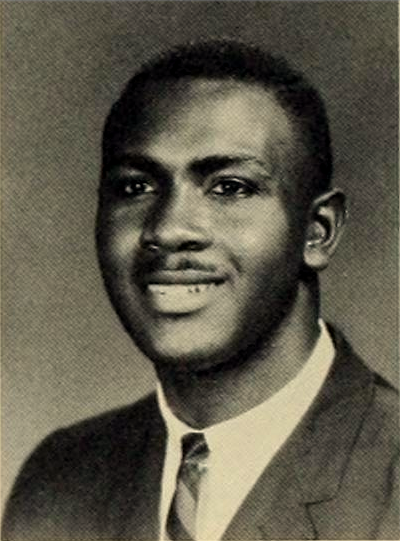
Nominee	Jesse Helms	Harvey Gantt
Party	Republican	Democratic
Popular vote	1,345,833	1,173,875
Percentage	52.6%	45.9%
- County results Helms: 40-50% 50-60% 60-70% 70-80% Gantt: 40–50% 50–60% 60–70%
U.S. senator before election
Jesse Helms
Republican
Elected U.S. Senator
Jesse Helms
Republican

The election was a rematch of the 1990 election: between the Republican incumbent Jesse Helms and the Democratic nominee Harvey Gantt. Gantt won the Democratic primary over Charles Sanders. Helms was unopposed. Helms won re-election to a fifth and final term by a slightly wider margin than in 1990.

1996 North Carolina U.S. Senate Democratic primary election
Party	Candidate	Votes	%	±%
Democratic	Harvey Gantt	308,337	52.40%	+14.88%
Democratic	Charles Sanders	245,297	41.68%	N/A
Democratic	Ralph McKinney	34,829	5.92%	N/A
Majority		53,040	10.72%	
Turnout		588,463	100.0%	
Republican hold				

Jesse Helms won the Republican Party's nomination unopposed.

1996 North Carolina U.S. Senate election
Party	Candidate	Votes	%	±%
Republican	Jesse Helms (incumbent)	1,345,833	52.64%	+0.08%
Democratic	Harvey Gantt	1,173,875	45.92%	−1.49%
Libertarian	Ray Ubinger	25,396	0.99%	N/A
Natural Law	Victor Pardo	11,209	0.44%	N/A
Turnout		2,556,456		

== Oklahoma ==
Oklahoma election
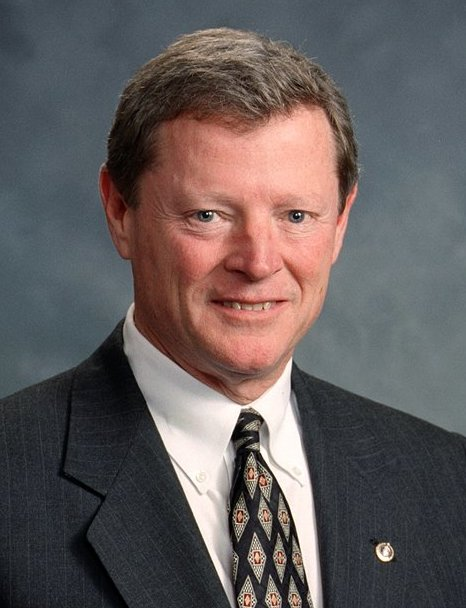
Nominee	Jim Inhofe	James Boren
Party	Republican	Democratic
Popular vote	670,610	474,162
Percentage	56.7%	40.1%
- County results Inhofe: 40-50% 50-60% 60-70% 70-80% Boren: 40–50% 50–60% 60–70%
U.S. senator before election
Jim Inhofe
Republican
Elected U.S. Senator
Jim Inhofe
Republican

Incumbent Republican Jim Inhofe won re-election to his first full term over Democratic businessman James Boren. He improved upon his margin in 1994 in the special election for the remainder of Democrat David Boren's term. Both candidates were unopposed in the primary.

General election
Party	Candidate	Votes	%
Republican	Jim Inhofe (incumbent)	670,610	56.7%
Democratic	Jim Boren	474,162	40.1%
Independent	Bill Maguire	15,092	1.3%
Libertarian	Agnes Marie Regier	14,595	1.2%
Independent	Chris Nedbalek	8,691	0.7%
Majority		196,448	16.6%
Turnout		1,183,150	100.00%
Republican hold			

== Oregon ==
Oregon had two elections due to a resignation, one in January, and then a second in November.

=== Oregon (special) ===
Oregon special election
- January 30, 1996
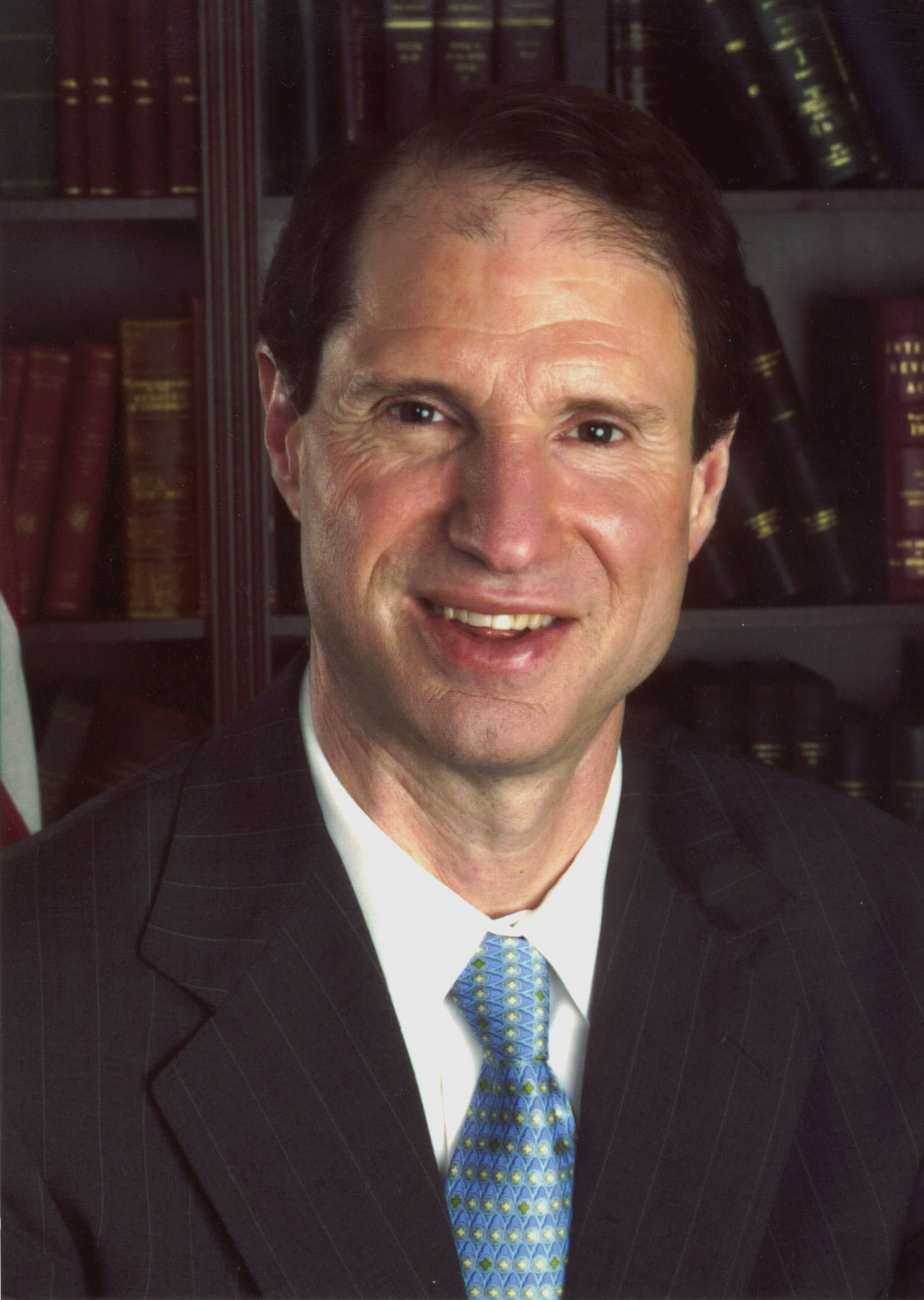

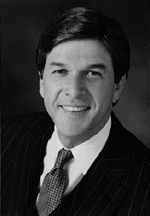
Nominee	Ron Wyden	Gordon Smith
Party	Democratic	Republican
Popular vote	571,739	553,519
Percentage	47.8%	46.3%
- County results Wyden: 40–50% 50–60% 60–70% Smith: 40-50% 50-60% 60-70% 70-80%
U.S. senator before election
Vacant
Elected U.S. Senator
Ron Wyden
Democratic

A special election was held on January 30, 1996, to fill the seat vacated by Republican Bob Packwood, who had resigned on October 1, 1995, due to sexual misconduct allegations.

In the primaries held on December 5, 1995, Democratic U. S. Representative Ron Wyden and Republican President of the Oregon State Senate Gordon H. Smith were nominated. Wyden narrowly defeated fellow U.S. Representative Peter DeFazio in the Democratic primary, while Smith won by a large margin, with the next closest candidate being Norma Paulus. Wyden then defeated Smith in the general election by just over one percentage point. Smith would win the regularly-scheduled election to the Senate later that year and serve alongside Wyden until 2009, when he was succeeded by Democrat Jeff Merkley.

Democratic primary
Party	Candidate	Votes	%
Democratic	Ron Wyden	212,532	49.46%
Democratic	Peter DeFazio	187,411	43.61%
Democratic	Anna Nevenic	11,201	2.61%
Democratic	Michael Donnelly	8,340	1.94%
Democratic	Write-in Candidates	7,959	1.85%
Democratic	J.J.T. Van Dooremolen	2,279	0.53%
Majority		25,121	5.85%
Total votes		429,722	100.00%

Republican primary
Party	Candidate	Votes	%
Republican	Gordon H. Smith	246,060	63.63%
Republican	Norma Paulus	98,158	25.38%
Republican	Jack Roberts	29,687	7.68%
Republican	John Thomas	3,272	0.85%
Republican	Brian Boquist	3,228	0.84%
Republican	Tony G. Zangaro	1,638	0.42%
Republican	Sam Berry	1,426	0.37%
Republican	Jeffrey Brady	1,160	0.3%
Republican	Valentine Christian	943	0.24%
Republican	Robert J. Fenton	632	0.16%
Republican	Lex Loeb	508	0.13%
Majority		147,902	38.25%
Total votes		386,712	100%

General election
Party	Candidate	Votes	%
Democratic	Ron Wyden	571,739	47.78%
Republican	Gordon H. Smith	553,519	46.26%
American Independent	Karen Shilling	25,597	2.14%
Libertarian	Gene Nanni	15,698	1.31%
Independent	Write-In Candidates	14,958	1.25%
Socialist	Vickie Valdez	7,872	0.66%
Pacific Green	Lou Gold	7,225	0.60%
Majority		18,220	1.52%
Total votes		1,196,608	100.0%
Democratic gain from Vacant			

=== Oregon (regular) ===
Oregon general election
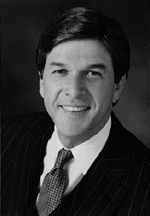

Nominee	Gordon Smith	Tom Bruggere
Party	Republican	Democratic
Popular vote	667,336	624,370
Percentage	49.8%	45.9%
- County results Smith: 40-50% 50-60% 60-70% 70-80% Bruggere: 40–50% 50–60% 60–70%
U.S. senator before election
Mark Hatfield
Republican
Elected U.S. Senator
Gordon H. Smith
Republican

Incumbent Republican Mark Hatfield decided to retire after thirty years in the Senate. Oregon State Senate President Gordon H. Smith, who had run for the Senate earlier that year, won the Republican primary with nominal opposition, while businessman Tom Bruggere won a contested Democratic primary over Harry Lonsdale, who had run in two previous Senate elections and was the Democratic nominee in 1990. The contest between Smith and Bruggere was one of the toughest that year, but ultimately, Smith was able to keep the seat in the Republican column and defeated Bruggere by a four-point margin.

Democratic primary
Party	Candidate	Votes	%
Democratic	Tom Bruggere	151,288	49.61%
Democratic	Harry Lonsdale	76,059	24.94%
Democratic	Bill Dwyer	30,871	10.12%
Democratic	Jerry Rust	27,773	9.11%
Democratic	Anna Nevenich	16,827	5.52%
Democratic	Write-ins	2,150	0.70%
Total votes		304,968	100.00%

Republican primary
Party	Candidate	Votes	%
Republican	Gordon H. Smith	224,428	78.06%
Republican	Lon Mabon	23,479	8.17%
Republican	Kirby Brumfield	15,744	5.48%
Republican	Jeff Lewis	13,359	4.65%
Republican	Robert J. Fenton	8,958	3.12%
Republican	Write-ins	1,532	0.53%
Total votes		287,500	100.00%

This was the second Senatorial race for Gordon Smith in 1996; he had previously lost to Ron Wyden in the special election to fill Bob Packwood's seat.

Both candidates spent heavily from their own resources. Bruggere won the Democratic nomination with $800,000 of his own money in the primary race, and was one of 134 candidates for the U.S. Congress to finance their own elections in excess of $50,000 in that cycle. Smith had already spent $2.5 million of his own money earlier that same year in an unsuccessful effort to defeat Democrat Ron Wyden in the 1996 special election to replace Bob Packwood, who had resigned.

Shortly after their respective primary victories, the rivals met for a highly publicized lunch, and agreed to run issue-oriented campaigns. However, in the final weeks of the campaign, Bruggere supporters ran advertisements alleging a pollution problem with Smith's frozen foods business, which the Smith campaign characterized as a breach of that agreement. A Boston Globe profile highlighted their similarities as corporate candidates with minimal political experience.

In the general election race, most Oregon daily newspapers endorsed Smith over Bruggere. The race was close, with neither side claiming victory for several days after the elections absentee ballots were tallied. After all votes were counted, Smith won by 4 percentage points. It was the last of the 1996 Senate elections to be determined; overall, the Republicans gained two seats in the Senate, increasing their majority from 53 to 55 seats.

Oregon general election
Party	Candidate	Votes	%	±%
Republican	Gordon H. Smith	677,336	49.80%	−3.89%
Democratic	Tom Bruggere	624,370	45.90%	−0.29%
Reform	Brent Thompson	20,381	1.50%	
Pacific Green	Gary Kutcher	14,193	1.04%	
Libertarian	Stormy Mohn	12,697	0.93%	
Socialist	Christopher Phelps	5,426	0.40%	
Natural Law	Michael L. Hoyes	4,425	0.33%	
Write-ins		1,402	0.10%	
Majority		52,966	3.89%	−3.60%
Turnout		1,360,230		
Republican hold		Swing		

== Rhode Island ==
Rhode Island election
- November 4, 1996
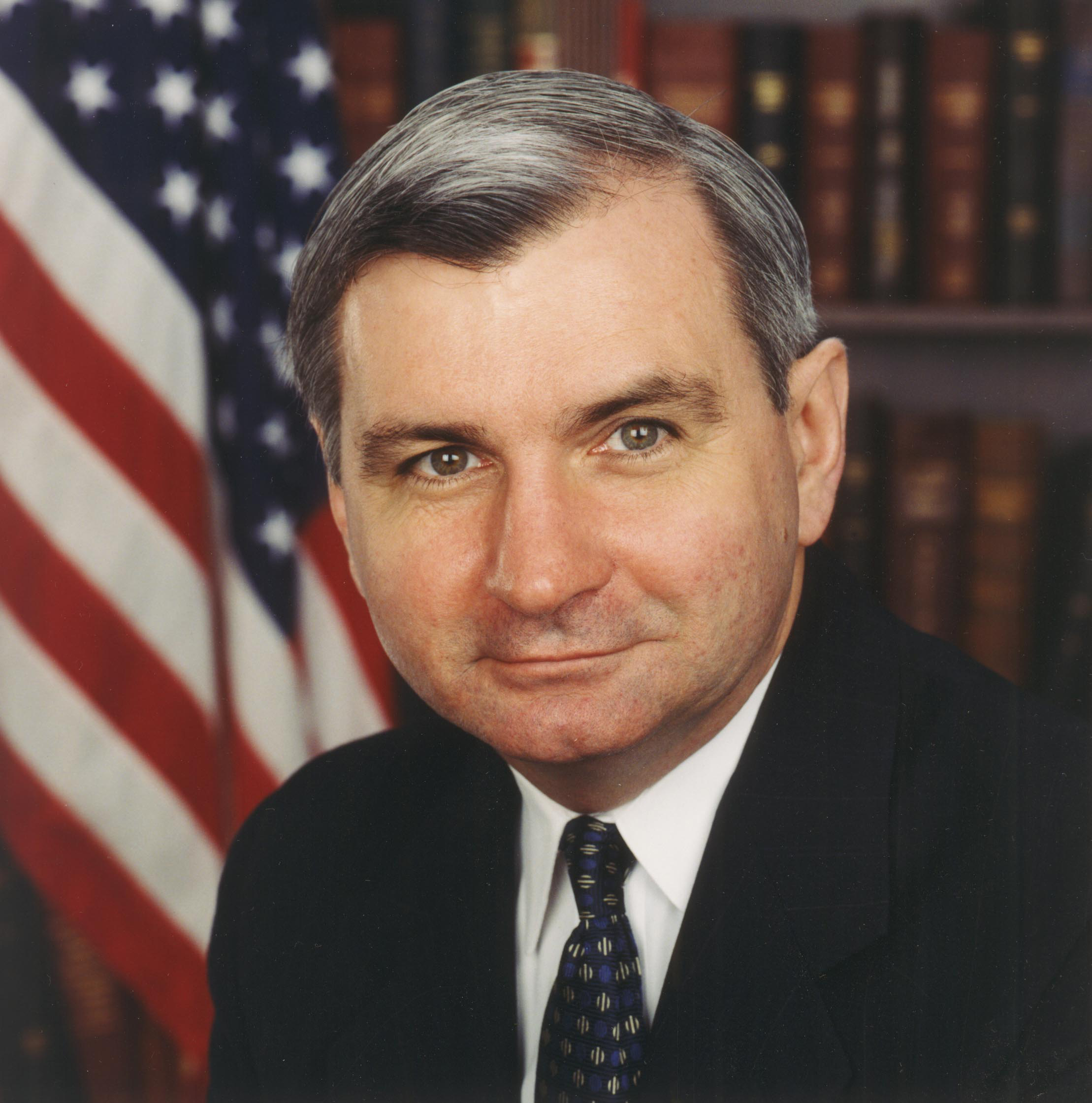
Nominee	Jack Reed	Nancy Mayer
Party	Democratic	Republican
Popular vote	230,676	127,368
Percentage	63.3%	35.0%
- Reed: 40–50% 50–60% 60–70% 70–80% Mayer: 40–50% 50–60%
U.S. senator before election
Claiborne Pell
Democratic
Elected U.S. Senator
Jack Reed
Democratic

Incumbent Democrat Claiborne Pell decided to retire. Incumbent U.S. Representative Jack Reed won the Democratic primary with little opposition, while state Treasurer Nancy Mayer won the Republican nomination. Reed defeated Mayer in a landslide, 63%-35%. Rhode Island has been reliably Democratic at the federal level since the 1930s, but Republicans still had success during the 1980s. In fact, Republican John Chafee won re-election just two years earlier in 1994 by a similar margin.

Democratic primary
Party	Candidate	Votes	%
Democratic	Jack Reed	59,336	86.13%
Democratic	Donald Gill	9,554	13.87%
Total votes		68,890	100.00%

Republican primary
Party	Candidate	Votes	%
Republican	Nancy Mayer	11,600	77.47%
Republican	Thomas R. Post, Jr.	2,302	15.37%
Republican	Theodore Leonard	1,072	7.16%
Total votes		14,974	100.00%

General election
Party	Candidate	Votes	%	±%
Democratic	Jack Reed	230,676	63.31%	+1.48%
Republican	Nancy Mayer	127,368	34.96%	−3.21%
Independent	Donald W. Lovejoy	6,327	1.74%	
Majority		103,308	28.35%	+4.69%
Turnout		364,371		
Democratic hold		Swing		

== South Carolina ==
South Carolina election
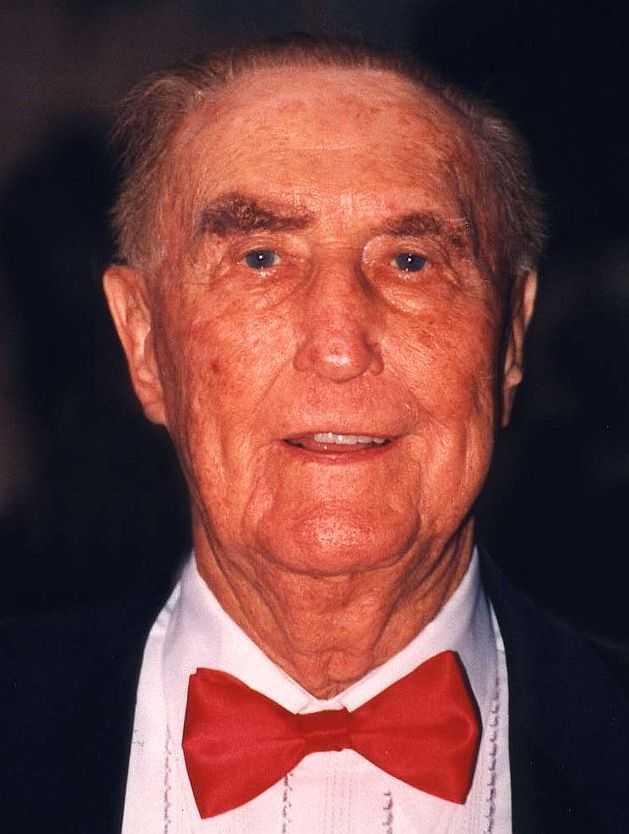

Nominee	Strom Thurmond	Elliott Springs Close
Party	Republican	Democratic
Popular vote	620,626	511,226
Percentage	53.4%	44.0%
- County results Thurmond: 40–50% 50–60% 60–70% 70–80% Close: 40-50% 50–60% 60–70%
U.S. senator before election
Strom Thurmond
Republican
Elected U.S. Senator
Strom Thurmond
Republican

Popular incumbent Republican Strom Thurmond won re-election against Democratic challenger Elliott Springs Close.

The South Carolina Democratic Party held their primary on June 11, 1996. Elliott Springs Close, a 43-year-old political novice from Columbia, entered the Democratic primary and faced opposition from photographer Cecil J. Williams. Close was a wealthy heir of a textile business, a brother-in-law of President Clinton's chief of staff Erskine Bowles, who styled himself as a fiscal conservative and a social moderate. Even though he proclaimed himself as such, he took positions that would align himself with the liberal wing of the Democratic party. Close would not have voted to balance the budget, he agreed with the "Don't ask, don't tell" policy of the military initiated by Clinton, and he supported continuing welfare as a federal entitlement program.

Democratic primary
Party	Candidate	Votes	%
Democratic	Elliott Springs Close	102,953	62.1%
Democratic	Cecil J. Williams	62,783	37.9%
Total votes		165,736	100.00%

The South Carolina Republican Party held their primary on June 11, 1996, and the contest pitted 93-year-old incumbent Senator Strom Thurmond against two relatively unknown candidates. Secretary of State Jim Miles was the only Republican statewide official who had not endorsed Strom Thurmond and it was rumored that he was considering entering the primary. Thurmond's press secretary, Mark Goodin, criticized Miles for not endorsing Thurmond and told those who contributed to Miles campaign fund that they were contributing to a contest against Thurmond, not the state's other Senator, Democrat Fritz Hollings. Miles soon endorsed Thurmond which left Harold G. Worley, a state representative from Myrtle Beach, and Charlie Thompson, an educator from Charleston, as the only opponents to Thurmond's election. Worley spent $600,000 of his own money and based his campaign almost solely on Thurmond's age. He questioned Thurmond's mental ability to make decisions and whether he had the capacity to fill out a full term, which would put Thurmond at one-hundred years old. Nevertheless, Thurmond cruised to a primary victory and Worley only carried Horry County.

Republican primary
Party	Candidate	Votes	%
Republican	Strom Thurmond	132,145	60.6%
Republican	Harold G. Worley	65,666	30.1%
Republican	Charlie Thompson	20,185	9.3%
Total votes		217,996	100.00%

The race between Thurmond and Close boiled down to whether Thurmond could retain the affection of voters who had re-elected him over and over or whether Close could convince the voters that Thurmond's age was an impediment to effective service for the state. Thurmond therefore adopted a non-confrontational approach to the campaign. He chose to not debate Close, not only because he had not debated an opponent since Olin D. Johnston in the 1950 Senate election, but also because it would only emphasize the 50-year age difference between the candidates. Thurmond energetically traversed the state greeting the voters and pointed out to them that with his experience, he could more effectively serve the state than a political neophyte.

Close ran television advertisements that highlighted the age issue by declaring that although Thurmond had admirably served the state for over fifty years, it was time for someone new to represent South Carolina. He poured almost a million dollars into his campaign, but his campaign never remained focused. For instance, trying to not appear too wealthy, Close traded his fancy foreign car for a Cadillac. He acquired a speeding ticket in the Cadillac and a newspaper criticized him for driving a luxury automobile. Frustrated, Close then switched his Cadillac for a Buick. Another instance of his jumbled campaign came when said that his family's textile factories did not lay off an employee during the Great Depression. Yet a week after this statement, three mills were closed and 850 employees were out of work.

By the day of the election on November 5, polls had shown that the voters thought it was time for Thurmond to retire, but they did not want to throw him out of office. Close spent almost a million dollars of his fortune to defeat Thurmond and his decision to raise a million dollars from outside sources was attacked by the Thurmond campaign of a lack of confidence by Close in his own campaign. Thurmond spent a little more than $2.6 million on the race and was said to have "dodged the bullet" by The State reporter Lee Bandy after his victory. The campaign aides of Thurmond stated he could have been defeated had either former Governor Richard Riley or 5th district congressman John M. Spratt, Jr. run against him.

South Carolina general election
Party	Candidate	Votes	%	±%
Republican	Strom Thurmond (incumbent)	620,326	53.4%	−10.8%
Democratic	Elliott Springs Close	511,226	44.0%	+11.5%
Libertarian	Richard T. Quillian	12,994	1.1%	−0.7%
Reform	Peter J. Ashy	9,741	0.8%	+0.8%
Natural Law	Annette C. Estes	7,697	0.7%	+0.7%
No party	Write-Ins	141	0.0%	−0.1%
Majority		109,100	9.4%	−22.3%
Turnout		1,162,125	64.0%	+8.8%
Republican hold		Swing		

== South Dakota ==
South Dakota election
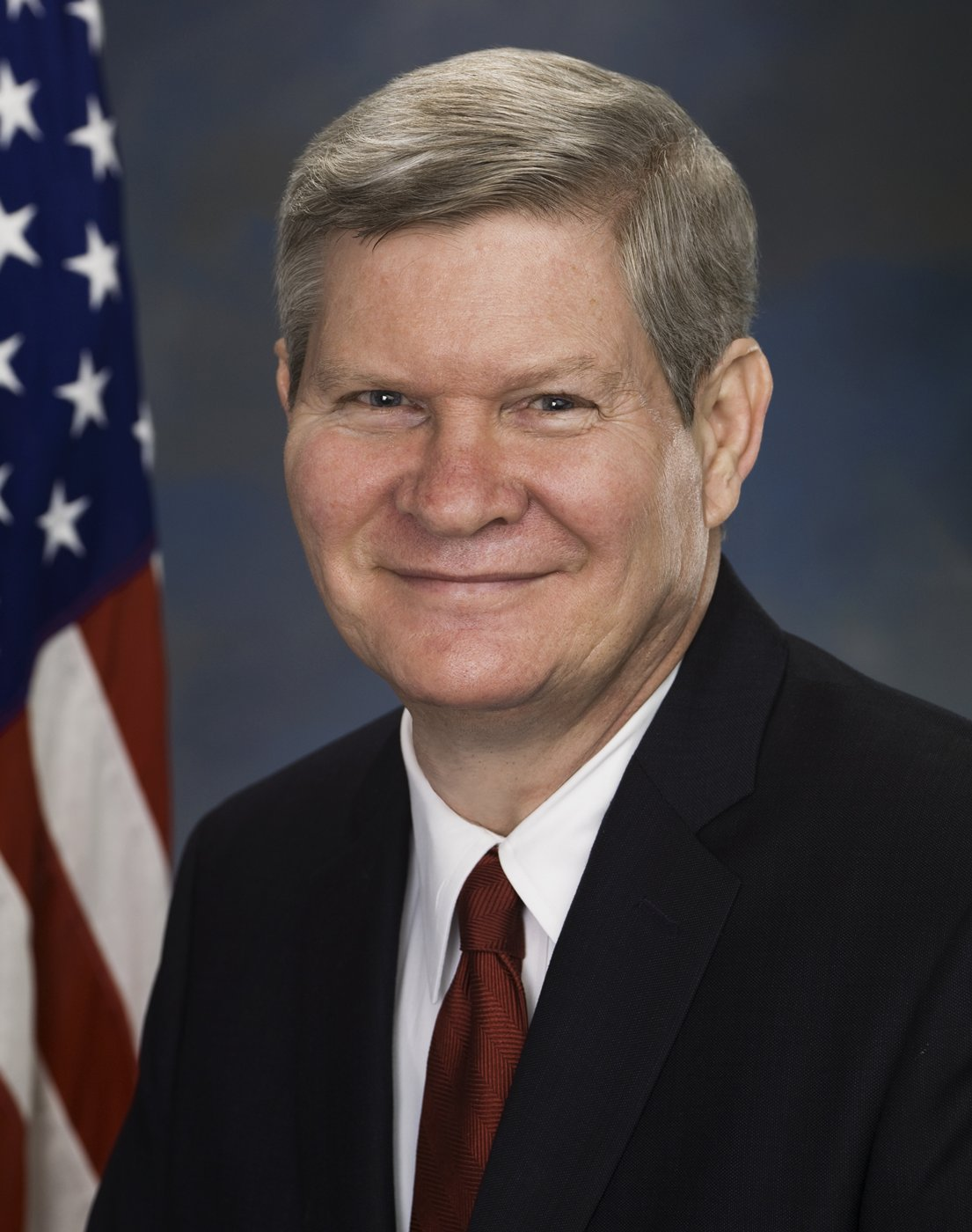

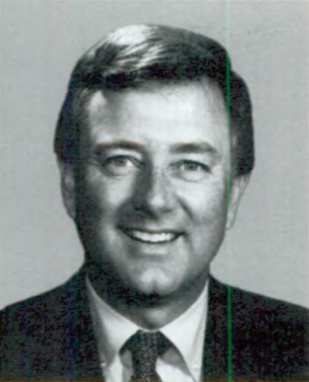
Nominee	Tim Johnson	Larry Pressler
Party	Democratic	Republican
Popular vote	166,533	157,954
Percentage	51.3%	48.7%
- County results Johnson: 50–60% 60–70% 70–80% 80–90% Pressler: 50–60% 60–70% 70–80%
U.S. senator before election
Larry Pressler
Republican
Elected U.S. Senator
Tim Johnson
Democratic

Incumbent Republican Larry Pressler ran for re-election to a fourth term, but narrowly lost to Democratic nominee Tim Johnson by 9,000 votes.

Pressler and Johnson swapped leads in their own polls all year. The two candidates also swapped charges. Pressler said that Johnson was too liberal for the state, while Johnson contended that Pressler was beholden to the out-of-state interests that have fattened his campaign coffers.

Seeking a fourth term, Pressler noted his seniority; his close ties to his longtime Senate colleague, Republican presidential candidate Bob Dole; and, most emphatically, the power he wielded as the chairman of the Commerce, Science and Transportation Committee.

Yet the massive changes in telecommunications law that he shepherded through the Senate since becoming chairman last year proved to be a mixed blessing politically for Pressler.

Political action committees related to industries affected by the legislation were generous donors to his campaign, and Pressler assured South Dakota voters that, over the long run, the bill will lower prices and provide jobs. But both telephone and cable television rates had gone up in South Dakota that year, leading Pressler to pull an ad stating that phone rates were going down.

Despite this apparently negative short-term effect, Pressler said that Johnson's votes against the "telecom" bill, along with his opposition to the GOP's seven-year balanced-budget plan and changes in farm policy, proved Johnson votes inconsistently with his moderate rhetoric.

"You say one thing in South Dakota and vote liberal all the time in Washington," intoned an announcer in a Pressler TV ad. In another ad, which Pressler called "the essence of my campaign," the senator himself called Johnson a liberal.

Johnson countered that Pressler's vote for the deficit- reducing budget-reconciliation package was a blow against the interests of farmers and seniors, two groups that helped fuel Pressler's victories in the past. Johnson also warned that farmers will be more vulnerable in years of poor yield under the new farm law. The so-called Freedom To Farm Act received mixed reviews from major agriculture groups in the state. The results were 51% for Johnson and 49% for Pressler.

General election results
Party	Candidate	Votes	%	±%
Democratic	Tim Johnson	166,533	51.32%	+6.25%
Republican	Larry Pressler (incumbent)	157,954	48.68%	−3.71%
Majority		8,579	2.64%	−4.68%
Turnout		324,487		
Democratic gain from Republican		Swing		

== Tennessee ==
Tennessee election
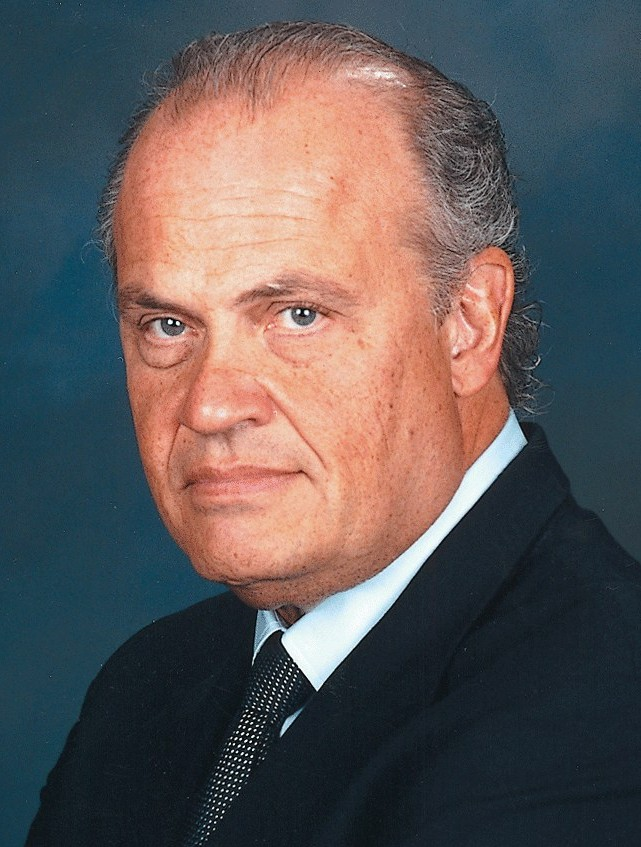

Nominee	Fred Thompson	Houston Gordon
Party	Republican	Democratic
Popular vote	1,091,554	654,937
Percentage	61.37%	36.82%
- County results Thompson: 50–60% 60—70% 70–80% Gordon: 50–60% 60–70%
U.S. senator before election
Fred Thompson
Republican
Elected U.S. Senator
Fred Thompson
Republican

Republican Senator Fred Thompson ran for re-election to a second term. Thompson defeated the Democratic challenger, Covington lawyer Houston Gordon, in the general election.

Tennessee general election
Party	Candidate	Votes	%	±%
Republican	Fred Thompson (incumbent)	1,091,554	61.37%	+0.93%
Democratic	Houston Gordon	654,937	36.82%	−1.79%
Independent	John Jay Hooker	14,401	0.81%	
Independent	Bruce Gold	5,865	0.33%	
Independent	Robert O. Watson	5,569	0.31%	
Independent	Greg Samples	4,104	0.23%	
Independent	Philip L. Kienlen	2,173	0.12%	
Write-ins		61	0.00%	
Majority		436,617	24.55%	+2.71%
Turnout		1,778,664		
Republican hold				

== Texas ==
Texas election
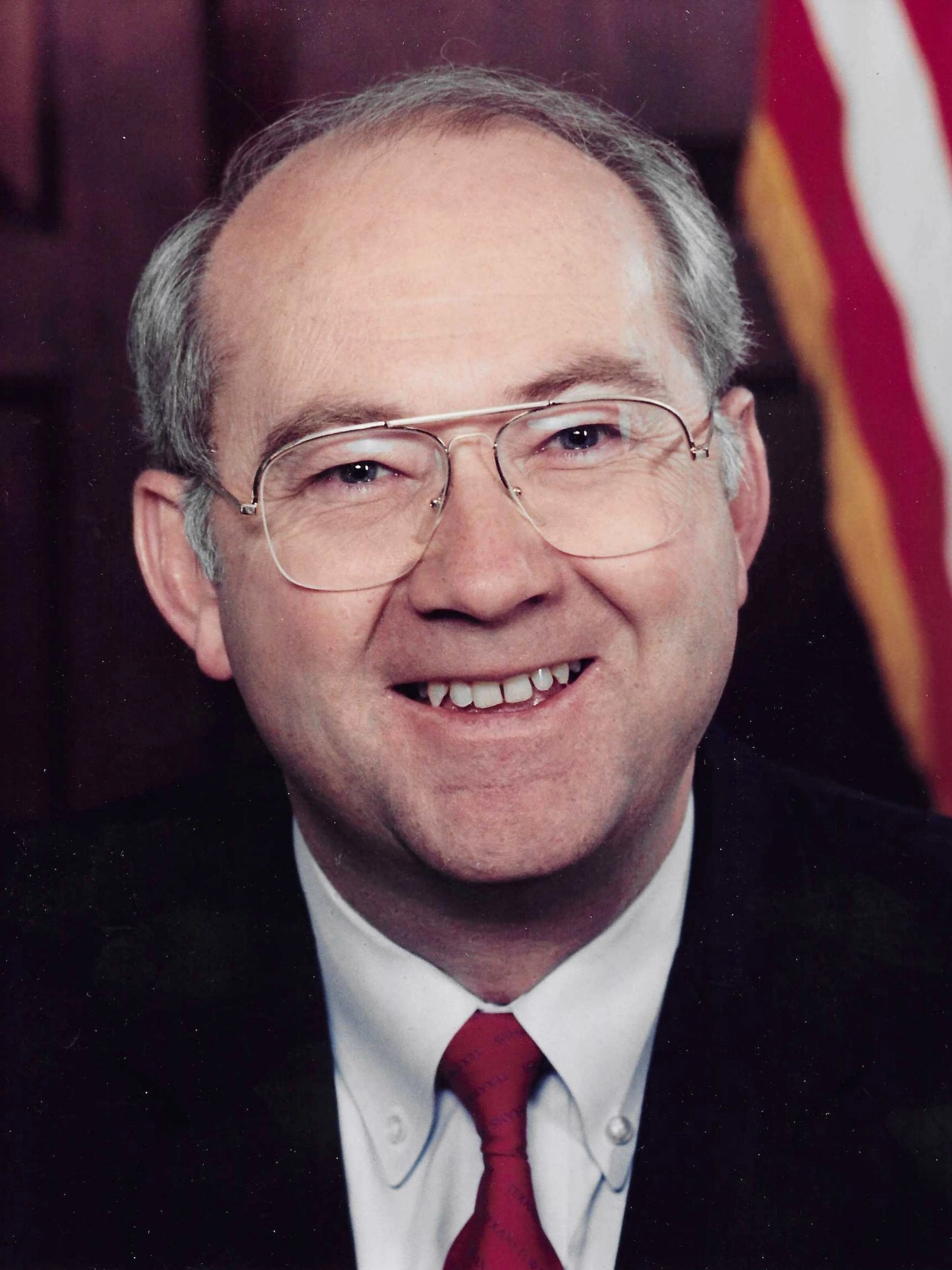

Nominee	Phil Gramm	Victor Morales
Party	Republican	Democratic
Popular vote	3,027,680	2,428,776
Percentage	54.8%	43.9%
- County results Gramm: 40–50% 50–60% 60–70% 70–80% 80–90% Morales: 40–50% 50–60% 60–70% 70–80% 80–90%
U.S. senator before election
Phil Gramm
Republican
Elected U.S. Senator
Phil Gramm
Republican

Incumbent Republican Phil Gramm won re-election to a third term over Democratic Navy veteran Victor Morales.

Gramm was easily renominated in the Republican primary. Morales, who never ran for public office before, pulled a major upset in the primary by defeated three politicians: U.S. Congressman John Wiley Bryant, U.S. Congressman Jim Chapman, and former State Supreme Court litigator John Odam. In the March run-off, he defeated Bryant with 51% of the vote. He became the first minority in Texas history to become a United States Senate nominee from either major party. Despite having no staff, raising only $15,000, and not accepting any special interest money, he obtained 2.5 million votes.

Gramm previously ran for president earlier in the year, but lost to fellow U.S. Senator Bob Dole in the Republican presidential primary. Gramm was the heavy favorite. A September poll showed Gramm leading 50% to 40%. A late October poll showed him leading with 53% to 31%.

Exit Polls showed that Gramm performed well with Anglos (68% to 31%), while Morales won African Americans (79% to 19%) and Latinos (79% to 20%) respectively.

General election
Party	Candidate	Votes	%
Republican	Phil Gramm (incumbent)	3,027,680	54.8%
Democratic	Victor M. Morales	2,428,776	43.9%
Libertarian	Michael Bird	51,516	0.9%
Natural Law	John Huff	19,469	0.4%
Majority		598,904	10.9%
Turnout		5,527,441	100.00%
Republican hold			

== Virginia ==
Virginia election
- Turnout: 50.2% (voting eligible)
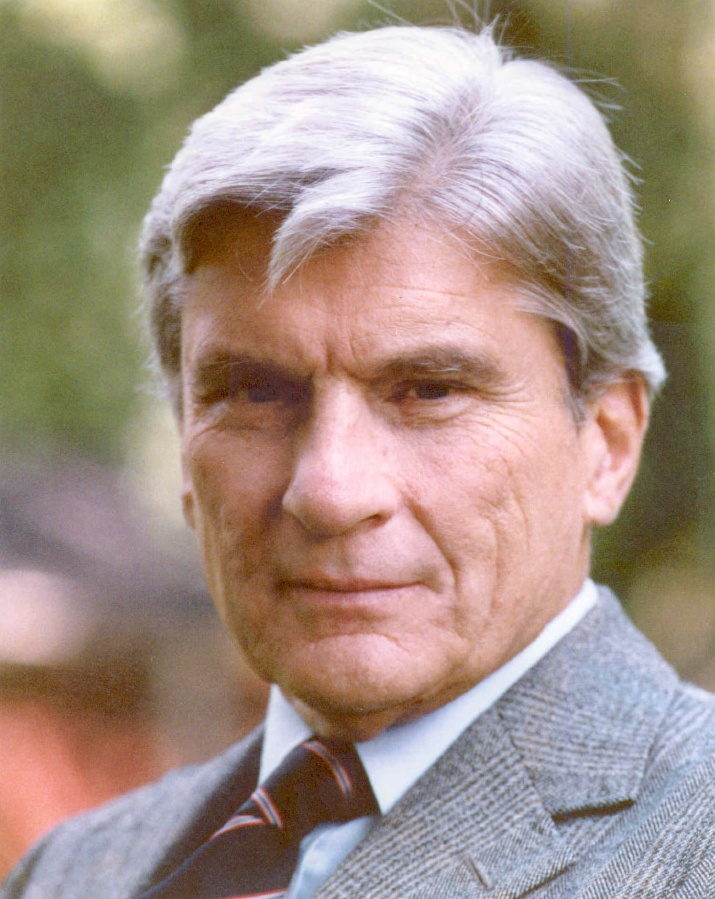

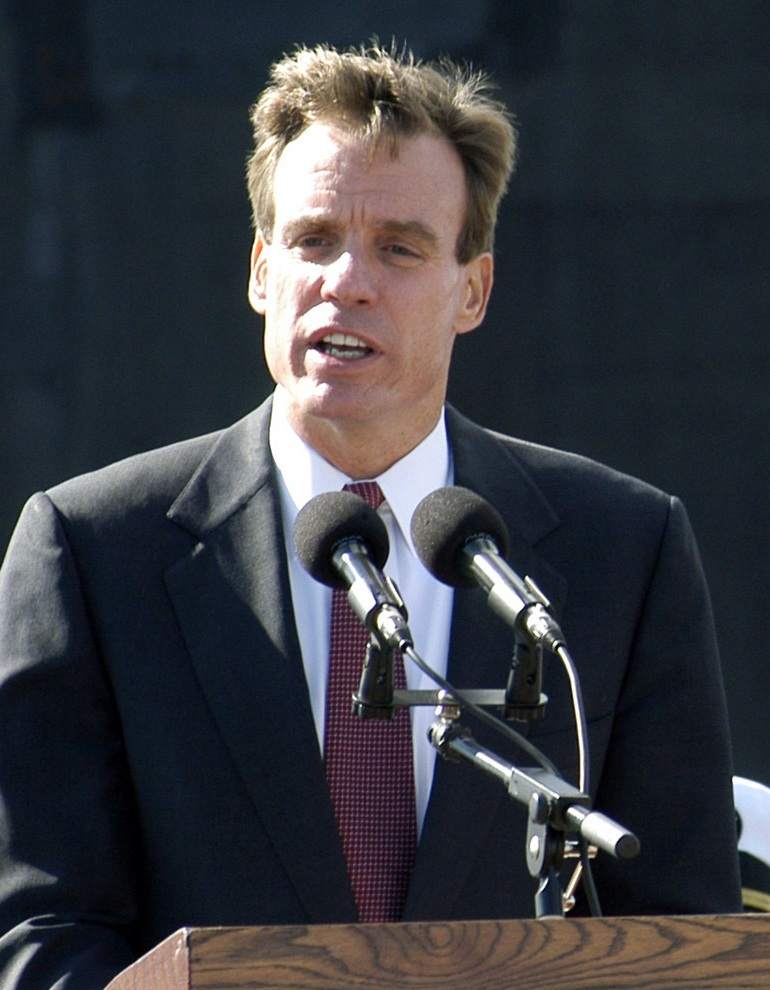
Nominee	John Warner	Mark Warner
Party	Republican	Democratic
Popular vote	1,235,743	1,115,981
Percentage	52.5%	47.4%
- County and independent city results J. Warner: 50–60% 60–70% 70–80% M. Warner: 50–60% 60–70% 70–80%
U.S. senator before election
John Warner
Republican
Elected U.S. Senator
John Warner
Republican

Incumbent Republican John Warner won re-election to a fourth term. Warner, a moderate Republican who held this Senate seat from 1979, remained a popular and powerful political figure. A former United States Secretary of the Navy, he was at this time chairman of the Senate Rules Committee.

Democratic convention vote
Party	Candidate	Votes	%
Democratic	Mark Warner	626	66.53%
Democratic	Leslie Byrne	301	31.99%
Democratic	Nancy B. Spannaus	14	1.49%
Total votes		941	100.00%

Warner easily won renomination over former OMB director James C. Miller III, despite opposition by a number of conservative Republicans, who distrusted him because of his moderate positions. (Warner is pro-abortion rights and pro-gun control, and refused to support 1994 Senate nominee Oliver North due to his role in the Iran-Contra Affair.)

Warner was endorsed by such notable figures as Bob Dole, George H. W. Bush, Gerald Ford and Colin Powell, while Miller was endorsed by the Christian Coalition of America and the National Rifle Association of America (NRA).

Republican primary
Party	Candidate	Votes	%
Republican	John Warner (incumbent)	323,520	65.55%
Republican	James C. Miller III	170,015	34.45%
Total votes		493,535	100.00%

The two Warners (no relation) competed in one of the closest Senate elections in Virginia history. The incumbent, who was a moderate Republican, was very popular and did not even have a major opponent in his last re-election bid in 1990. Although Mark Warner was relatively unknown, he became one of John Warner's strongest challengers. The Democrat self-financed his campaign and ended up outspending the Republican. In October, the Democrat outspent the incumbent 5–1.

The incumbent had to compete in a primary against James C. Miller III, who was more conservative, because he decided to endorse an independent in the 1994 U.S. Senate election, opting not to endorse the controversial Republican nominee, Oliver North. Despite this, North did endorse John Warner in the 1996 election. In the general election, the incumbent called the Democrat a "robber baron," "Carpetbagger," and a "Connecticut Yankee" who raised money from outside the state. Mark Warner tried to compete in the Southern part of the state, which is traditionally Republican territory. He earned the endorsement from the Reform Party of Virginia.

In June, the incumbent was leading 58%–24%. On September 19, the incumbent led 54%–34%.

Virginia general election
Party	Candidate	Votes	%	±%
Republican	John Warner (incumbent)	1,235,744	52.48%	−28.43%
Democratic	Mark Warner	1,115,982	47.39%	+47.39%
Write-ins		2,989	0.13%	+0.81%
Majority		119,762	5.09%	−57.67%
Turnout		2,354,715		
Republican hold		Swing		

Mark Warner lost the parts of the state that are outside the three largest metropolitan areas, 51%–49%, a very impressive result for a Democrat in this heavily Republican territory. However, John Warner's strength among moderates enabled him to carry Northern Virginia 55%–45%, which got him over the top. Warner would win election to the U.S. Senate in 2008, receiving John Warner's endorsement.

== West Virginia ==
1996 United States Senate election in West Virginia
- November 5, 1996
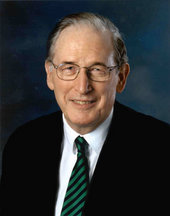

Nominee	Jay Rockefeller	Betty Burks
Party	Democratic	Republican
Popular vote	456,526	139,088
Percentage	76.65%	23.35%
- County results Rockefeller: 50–60% 60–70% 70–80% 80–90% >90%
U.S. senator before election
Jay Rockefeller
Democratic
Elected U.S. Senator
Jay Rockefeller
Democratic

Incumbent Democrat Jay Rockefeller won re-election to a third term victory over Betty Berks.

Incumbent Democrat Jay Rockefeller ran for re-election to a third term. He defeated Bruce Barilla, a Christian activist, in the Democratic primary by a wide margin. He faced Republican Betty A. Burks and won by a wide margin in the general election, 77%-23%. West Virginia, a longtime Democratic stronghold, began to shift red after Arch A. Moore Jr. was twice elected governor. Though Bush started a Republican winning streak at the presidential level in 2000, Rockefeller never faced a competitive re-election campaign in his tenure.

General election
Party	Candidate	Votes	%
Democratic	Jay Rockefeller (incumbent)	456,526	76.7%
Republican	Betty A. Burks	139,088	23.3%
Majority		317,438	53.4%
Turnout		695,614	100.00%
Democratic hold			

== Wyoming ==
1996 United States Senate election in Wyoming
- November 5, 1996
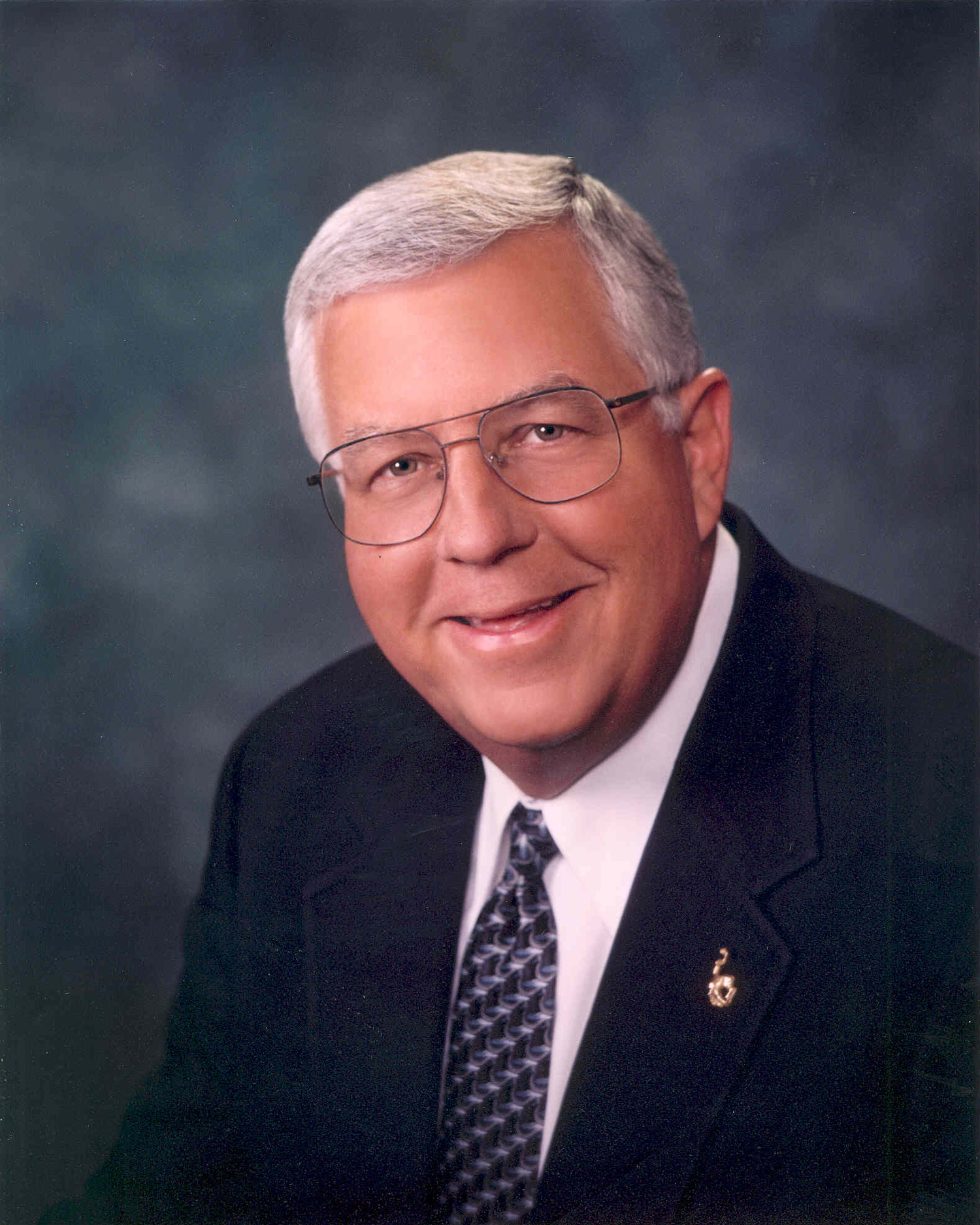

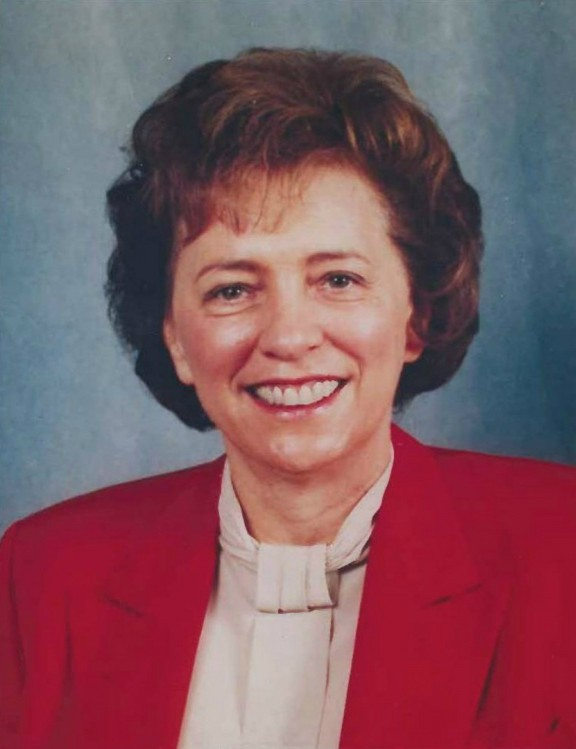
Nominee	Mike Enzi	Kathy Karpan
Party	Republican	Democratic
Popular vote	114,116	89,103
Percentage	54.1%	42.2%
- County results Enzi: 40–50% 50–60% 60–70% Karpan: 40–50% 50–60%
U.S. senator before election
Alan K. Simpson
Republican
Elected U.S. Senator
Mike Enzi
Republican

Incumbent Republican Alan K. Simpson decided to retire. Democrat Kathy Karpan, Wyoming Secretary of State, won the Democratic primary over Mickey Kalinay. Wyoming State Senator Mike Enzi won the Republican primary over John Barrasso and Curt Meier. Barrasso was later appointed to the U.S. Senate after the death of Craig L. Thomas and re-elected in his own right three times.

Enzi defeated Karpan by 12 points in the general election. Wyoming is one of the most Republican states in the country, and Enzi's re-election margin was similar to Bob Dole's 13-point margin over incumbent U.S. President Bill Clinton in the state.

Democratic primary
Party	Candidate	Votes	%
Democratic	Kathy Karpan	32,419	86.07%
Democratic	Mickey Kalinay	5,245	13.93%
Total votes		37,664	100.00%

Republican primary
Party	Candidate	Votes	%
Republican	Mike Enzi	27,056	32.47%
Republican	John Barrasso	24,918	29.90%
Republican	Curt Meier	14,739	17.69%
Republican	Nimi McConigley	6,005	7.21%
Republican	Kevin Meenan	6,000	7.20%
Republican	Kathleen P. Jachkowski	2,269	2.72%
Republican	Brian E. Coen	943	1.13%
Republican	Cleveland B. Holloway	874	1.05%
Republican	Russ Hanrahan	524	0.63%
Total votes		83,328	100.00%

General election
Party	Candidate	Votes	%	±%
Republican	Mike Enzi	114,116	54.06%	−9.87%
Democratic	Kathy Karpan	89,103	42.21%	+6.15%
Libertarian	David Herbert	5,289	2.51%	
Natural Law	Lloyd Marsden	2,569	1.22%	
Majority		25,013	11.85%	−16.02%
Turnout		211,077		
Republican hold		Swing		

== See also ==
- 1996 United States elections
  - 1996 United States gubernatorial elections
  - 1996 United States presidential election
  - 1996 United States House of Representatives elections
- 104th United States Congress
- 105th United States Congress
