= Jerry Rust =

American politician and activist

- Rust in 1982

Member of the Lane Community College Board of Education
- Incumbent
- Assumed office July 1, 2025
- Preceded by: Denise Diamond

Member of the Lane County Board of Commissioners
- In office January 1977 – January 1997
- Preceded by: Frank Elliott
- Succeeded by: Pete Sorenson

Personal details
- Born: March 10, 1943 (age 83) Grant County, Oregon
- Party: Democratic
- Spouse(s): Sidney Roscoe (m. 1968; died 1993) Zhang "Star" Yucai (m. 2005; died 2021)
- Children: 3
- Education: University of Oregon
- Profession: Politician, environmentalist

Gerald Harrison Rust Jr. (born March 10, 1943) is an American politician, activist and environmentalist. He co-founded the Hoedads Reforestation Cooperative, served for two decades on the Lane County, Oregon, Board of Commissioners, and unsuccessfully ran for Governor of Oregon and for the United States Senate. Since 2025, he has served on the Lane Community College Board of Education.

== Early life and career ==
Rust was born in 1943 outside Prairie City, Oregon, in Grant County, and grew up on a farm in Douglas County outside Roseburg. He graduated from Glide High School. His parents were Republicans.

According to Rust, he was inspired to enter public service after listening to President John F. Kennedy's inaugural speech, in which he implored Americans to "ask not what your country can do for you, ask what you can do for your country." He attended the University of Oregon, graduating in 1965 with a degree in political science.

While a student in 1964, Rust protested against the looming Vietnam War and later was a draft dodger. After graduation, he joined the Peace Corps and served for two years in India. He was a longstanding supporter of and participant in Eugene's activist counterculture, attributing its staying power to the existence of the university. Rust was a friend of Ken Kesey. Reflecting on his involvement in the counterculture scene in 1987 after serving in elected office, he said:

I always liked Kesey’s statement that ‘We’re not the counterculture, were the culture,’ Rust says. “The other guys are the counterculture The ones who want to have nuclear war or at least the ones who are compelling us to prepare for nuclear war — eating too much red meat, harvesting our resources faster than they can be replenished, consuming all the oil, dominating Third World countries, discriminating against blacks and women (and) gays. Kesey turns the question around and says ‘I’d rather choose to be on the side of culture and progress. And to me, the backward elements of our society ought to be thought of as the counterculture.

Rust and John Sundquist founded the Hoedads Reforestation Cooperative in 1971. Rust had returned from his Peace Corps stint in India in the late 1960s and found work planting trees beginning in December 1969. Both Rust and Sundquist had a love of tree planting but realized that the economics of the industry favored those who organized work crews to bid on jobs with the government or forest owners, rather than merely laboring. The Hoedads operated as a worker cooperative.

In founding the Hoedads, Rust, Sundquist, and other early members explained their structure using the countercultural vocabulary of the time:

So it was a really heady, yeasty, times-they-are-a-changin’ time, when people like me didn’t want to work for ‘The Man.’ We wanted to do something else and that’s what kind of led us naturally to this dirty little profession of planting trees...I just figured that we wanted to, we figured that we were getting paid $3.25 an hour while some contractor was raking off thousands of dollars. And why shouldn’t we just all get together, form a little—We didn’t know what a co-op was except that it was going to be a democratically-controlled group of people that, you know, stood for the right thing and went out and planted the trees and shared the money, based on merit or whatever logic we applied to it.

The Hoedads emphasized racial and gender equality in the workplace and had an all-women and all-Latino crew; they included people from all walks of life but were united by opposition to the Vietnam War. Hundreds of Hoedad volunteers worked on Rust's 1976 campaign for county commissioner. He later remarked: “When I die, dig my grave with a silver hoedad and hope I grow into something good."

Following his tenure as Lane County Commissioner, Rust worked for two years as an English teacher in China, and has intermittently returned. He had previously visited Fujian Province in 1984 on a state delegation. In 2001, he became director and president of the Northwest Power Pool corporation, which connects Oregon's main electrical utilities. In 2012, he published a murder mystery novel titled The Covered Bridge Murders.

== Political career ==
In 1976, Rust was elected to the Lane County Commission, defeating incumbent Frank Elliott and Andy Maxon for Position No. 3, representing South Eugene. Running an unconventional campaign, he was credited with turning out voters who would otherwise not vote. He was re-elected in 1980, 1984, 1988 and 1992.

As county commissioner, Rust fought to preserve Lane County's covered bridges, which currently number 20. Facing opposition from county staff and fellow commissioners who sought to replace the bridges with more modern, cement-and-steel bridges, Rust persuaded the Oregon State Legislature to pass a bill setting aside funds for covered bridge maintenance, obtained via Oregon State Lottery funds, which also establish the Oregon State Covered Bridge Committee, chaired by State Senator Mae Yih. Presently, Lane County has the highest amount of covered bridges of any county west of the Mississippi River.

For the first two years of his tenure, Rust was one of three county commissioners; the county switched to a five-member board in 1979.

Rust ran in the 1982 Oregon gubernatorial election. He campaigned on establishing a state-owned bank similar to the Bank of North Dakota, renewable energy, forest preservation, and environmental conservation. He finished third in the Democratic primary with 7.3% of the vote, losing to Ted Kulongoski, who went on to lose the general election to incumbent Governor Victor Atiyeh.

Rust ran for the United States Senate in the 1996 election. Rust ran an environmentally-focused campaign, supporting the preservation of old-growth forests and the Northern spotted owl.

Ultimately, he lost the Democratic primary to Tom Bruggere, who went on to lose the general election to Republican Gordon Smith. Rust finished fourth in the primary, behind Bruggere, Harry Lonsdale, and Bill Dwyer, receiving 9.1% of the vote.

In 2010, Rust attempted a comeback run for the Lane County Commission after incumbent Bill Fleenor retired. He ran for the West Lane County district, including the rural areas to the west of Eugene, and campaigned on improving energy infrastructure in Lane County, revitalizing the county's economy, and preserving Eugene's urban growth boundary. He also suggested expanding the county's wine industry. Rust was endorsed by U.S. Representative Peter DeFazio and the Eugene Weekly newspaper. In the May primary election, Rust received 47.6% of the vote, advancing to a runoff against Jay Bozievich, who received 36.3%, with the remainder going to three other candidates. Bozievich was a "Tea Party" Republican and former Libertarian who had served on the Lane Community College board. In the November runoff, Bozievich defeated Rust, 55.2% to 44.3%.

Rust ran to represent the 9th district of the Oregon House of Representatives in 2022.

Rust ran for District 9 in the Oregon House of Representatives in 2022, centered on the south-central Oregon coast. As Republican incumbent Boomer Wright was running unopposed with no Democrat having filed in time, Rust mounted a write-in campaign for the Democratic nomination. He ultimately received a sufficient amount of write-in votes, securing the nomination. Rust lost the general election to Wright, 39.8% to 60.1%.

In 2025, Rust entered the race for Lane Community College Board of Education. He was endorsed by LCC's faculty union, the Lane Community College Education Association, as well as the Eugene Weekly, alongside fellow candidates Austin Fölnagy, Devon Lawson and Jesse Maldonado. Rust was elected with 66.5% of the vote, defeating Jeffrey Cooper, who had the support of the right-wing faction on the Lane County Board of Commissioners. He took office in July 2025 and was selected as vice-chair of the board for the 2025–26 term.

In March 2026, Rust, along with fellow LCC board members Austin Fölnagy and Zach Mulholland, voted against a tuition increase which ultimately passed by a 4–3 vote.

=== Political views ===
In 2010, Rust was described as a "liberal Democrat." His views have also been described as moderate, and he emphasized bipartisanship during his 2022 state legislative campaign. The Los Angeles Times called him one of Oregon's "most outspoken political environmentalists."

During his 1996 U.S. Senate campaign, Rust championed campaign finance reform and support for public lands. He advocated for an increased minimum wage and increased investment in education and healthcare at the expense of military funding, stating he would "redirect priorities towards human and community renewal." Rust opposes clear-cutting. He supports banning agricultural pesticides near waterways and a stronger Endangered Species Act.

On foreign policy, Rust has supported reducing the U.S. military budget and using the money to invest in public services. Nuclear disarmament was a major theme of his statewide campaigns. In 1982, Rust opposed U.S. involvement in the Salvadoran Civil War and warned it could become "another Vietnam." During his 1996 campaign, he indicated support for Israel as "the only democracy in the Middle East."

In 1996, Rust advocated for an expansion of the Oregon Bottle Bill.

During his 2010 campaign, Rust said he was undecided about a potential expansion of the EmX bus line to West Eugene. The extension was ultimately approved, opening in 2017.

Rust supports abortion rights.

== Personal life ==
While attending the University of Oregon, Rust met his future wife, Sidney Roscoe; they married in 1968 and had three children together: Trevor, Molly, and Henry. She died of brain cancer in 1993. After his departure from elected office, he moved to Portland and served as president of the Kenton Neighborhood Association. He later retired to rural Lane County outside Florence, Oregon. In 2005, Rust married Zhang "Star" Yucai, originally from Yantai, Shandong Province, China, whom he met while teaching English there. She was a communications industry professional and had been a student of his, and he chose her English name, as was common practice with his students. Zhang died of cancer on September 28, 2021.

Rust lives on a farm on the Siuslaw River, between Florence and Mapleton.
