= 1996 United States Senate election in Oregon =

- November 5, 1996
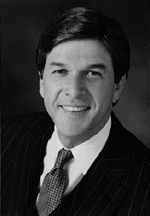

Nominee	Gordon Smith	Tom Bruggere
Party	Republican	Democratic
Popular vote	667,336	624,370
Percentage	49.80%	45.90%
- County results Smith: 40–50% 50–60% 60–70% 70–80% Bruggere: 40–50% 50–60% 60–70%
U.S. senator before election
Mark Hatfield
Republican
Elected U.S. Senator
Gordon H. Smith
Republican

The 1996 United States Senate election in Oregon was held on November 5, 1996. Incumbent Republican United States Senator Mark Hatfield decided to retire after thirty years in the Senate. Oregon State Senate President Gordon H. Smith, who had run for the Senate earlier that year, won the Republican primary, while businessman Tom Bruggere won a contested Democratic primary. The contest between Smith and Bruggere was one of the toughest that year, but ultimately, Smith was able to keep the seat in the Republican column and defeated Bruggere by a narrow margin. This is the last time that Oregon simultaneously voted for presidential and U.S. Senate candidates of different political parties.

== Democratic primary ==
=== Candidates ===
- Tom Bruggere, businessman
- Bill Dwyer, State Senator
- Harry Lonsdale, businessman and nominee for the U.S. Senate in 1990
- Anna Nevenich, nurse and perennial candidate
- Jerry Rust, Lane County Commissioner and candidate for Governor of Oregon in 1982

=== Results ===
Results by county, Democratic primary: Tom Bruggere: 55–60% 50–55% 45–50% 40–45% 35–40% 25–30%; Harry Lonsdale: 30–35% 25–30%

Democratic primary results
Party	Candidate	Votes	%
Democratic	Tom Bruggere	151,288	49.61%
Democratic	Harry Lonsdale	76,059	24.94%
Democratic	Bill Dwyer	30,871	10.12%
Democratic	Jerry Rust	27,773	9.11%
Democratic	Anna Nevenich	16,827	5.52%
Democratic	Write-ins	2,150	0.70%
Total votes		304,968	100.00%

== Republican primary ==
=== Candidates ===
- Kirby Brumfield
- Robert J. Fenton, candidate for the U.S. Senate in the 1996 special election
- Jeff Lewis, nominee for the State House of Representatives in 1994
- Lon Mabon, conservative activist
- Gordon H. Smith, President of the Oregon State Senate and nominee for the U.S. Senate in the 1996 special election

=== Results ===
Republican primary results
Party	Candidate	Votes	%
Republican	Gordon H. Smith	224,428	78.06%
Republican	Lon Mabon	23,479	8.17%
Republican	Kirby Brumfield	15,744	5.48%
Republican	Jeff Lewis	13,359	4.65%
Republican	Robert J. Fenton	8,958	3.12%
Republican	Write-ins	1,532	0.53%
Total votes		287,500	100.00%

== General election ==
=== Campaign ===
This was the second Senatorial race for Gordon Smith in 1996; he had previously lost to Ron Wyden in the special election to fill Bob Packwood's seat.

Both candidates spent heavily from their own resources. Bruggere won the Democratic nomination with $800,000 of his own money in the primary race, and was one of 134 candidates for the U.S. Congress to finance their own elections in excess of $50,000 in that cycle. Smith had already spent $2.5 million of his own money earlier that same year in an unsuccessful effort to defeat Democrat Ron Wyden in the 1996 special election to replace Bob Packwood, who had resigned.

Shortly after their respective primary victories, the rivals met for a highly publicized lunch, and agreed to run issue-oriented campaigns. However, in the final weeks of the campaign, Bruggere supporters ran advertisements alleging a pollution problem with Smith's frozen foods business, which the Smith campaign characterized as a breach of that agreement. A Boston Globe profile highlighted their similarities as corporate candidates with minimal political experience.

In the general election race, most Oregon daily newspapers endorsed Smith over Bruggere. The race was close, with neither side claiming victory for several days after the election, as absentee ballots were tallied. After all votes were counted, Smith won by 4 percentage points. It was the last of the 1996 Senate elections to be determined; overall, the Republicans gained two seats in the Senate, increasing their majority from 53 to 55 seats.

=== Results ===
United States Senate election in Oregon, 1996
Party	Candidate	Votes	%	±%
Republican	Gordon H. Smith	677,336	49.80%	−3.89%
Democratic	Tom Bruggere	624,370	45.90%	−0.29%
Reform	Brent Thompson	20,381	1.50%	
Pacific Green	Gary Kutcher	14,193	1.04%	
Libertarian	Stormy Mohn	12,697	0.93%	
Socialist	Christopher Phelps	5,426	0.40%	
Natural Law	Michael L. Hoyes	4,425	0.33%	
Write-ins		1,402	0.10%	
Majority		52,966	3.89%	−3.60%
Turnout		1,360,230		
Republican hold		Swing		

== See also ==
- 1996 United States Senate elections
