= 1990 United States Senate election in Oregon =

- November 6, 1990
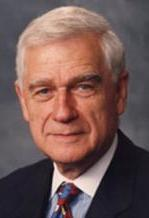

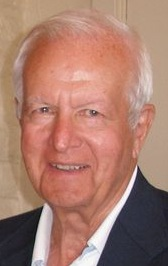
Nominee	Mark Hatfield	Harry Lonsdale
Party	Republican	Democratic
Popular vote	590,095	507,743
Percentage	53.68%	46.19%
- County results Hatfield: 40–50% 50–60% 60–70% Lonsdale: 40–50% 50–60%
U.S. senator before election
Mark Hatfield
Republican
Elected U.S. Senator
Mark Hatfield
Republican

The 1990 Oregon United States Senate election was held on November 6, 1990, to select the U.S. Senator from the state of Oregon. Republican candidate Mark Hatfield was re-elected to a fifth term, defeating Democratic businessman Harry Lonsdale.

== Primaries ==
The front-runners emerged quickly: for the Republicans, Hatfield was in his fourth term and was the 8th most senior U.S. Senator, having previously served as Governor of Oregon for two terms and Oregon Secretary of State. For the Democrats, Harry Lonsdale, who had founded the biotechnology company Bend Research, announced in early 1990 that he intended to aggressively challenge Hatfield over the incumbent's ties to special interests, and his positions on abortion rights and timber management.

=== Republican primary ===
==== Campaign ====
In the Republican primary, Hatfield received a token challenge from Randy Prince, an environmentalist and former Eugene mayoral candidate who had once protested old-growth forest logging by tree sitting for 40 days. Despite an early miscue by Hatfield in which he missed the deadline for submitting a photograph for the primary voter's guide, Hatfield handily defeated Prince to move on to the general election.

==== Results ====
1990 Republican primary for United States Senator from Oregon
Party	Candidate	Votes	%
Republican	Mark Hatfield (incumbent)	208,327	79%
Republican	Randy Prince	54,722	21%
Total votes		263,099	100.00%

=== Democratic primary ===
==== Campaign ====
Representative Ron Wyden of Oregon's 3rd congressional district considered challenging Hatfield, but decided against it. Lonsdale, who was unknown as a politician, announced his campaign in March, and came out swinging directly at Hatfield and mostly ignored his primary challengers. Lonsdale's main campaign themes were abortion rights, which Hatfield opposed; and timber management, in which Lonsdale opposed exporting timber from Oregon forests and wanted to restrict logging in old-growth forests. Lonsdale also criticized Hatfield as being out-of-touch with Oregonians after so many years in the Senate. Lonsdale announced that he would refuse to take special-interest contributions in his campaign, and would finance the campaign himself with the millions he had made from Bend Research. Lonsdale easily defeated his competition: Salem attorney Steve Anderson, Pleasant Hill computer programmer Neale S. Hyatt, Milwaukie retired truck driver Brooks Washburne, Eugene activist Bob Reuschlein, and Frank A. Clough, also of Eugene.

==== Results ====
Democratic primary for the United States Senate from Oregon, 1990
Party	Candidate	Votes	%
Democratic	Harry Lonsdale	162,529	64.13%
Democratic	Steve Anderson	34,305	13.54%
Democratic	Neale S. Hyatt	20,684	8.16%
Democratic	Brooks Washburne	13,766	5.43%
Democratic	Bob Reuschlein	12,383	4.89%
Democratic	Frank Clough	8,235	3.25%
Democratic	miscellaneous	1,535	0.61%
Total votes		253,437	100.00%

== General election ==
=== Campaign ===
Once the primaries concluded, Hatfield, who had been first elected U.S. Senator in 1966, rolled out his usual campaign honed from his decades of experience: he refused debates, never engaged his opponent directly, and focused on small, friendly campaign appearances that stressed the influence he wielded as a U.S. Senator with seniority and influence.

Lonsdale's self-financed campaign made heavy use of TV attack ads, criticizing Hatfield as being out of step with Oregonians on every issue, but primarily in terms of timber and abortion. He also made use of a nationwide anti-incumbency sentiment, and tore into Hatfield for being too closely tied to Washington special interests, and attempted to tie Hatfield to the Savings and loan crisis of the mid-1980s through his advisor Gerry Frank of the Meier & Frank chain of Oregon department stores, who had ties to a Salem savings and loan. By early October, polls showed the gap closing from 25 down to about 4 points in an early October poll conducted by The Oregonian newspaper, and by the end of October, some polls showed Lonsdale in the lead.

With the polls running against him and time running out, Hatfield, who had not been seriously challenged since first being elected in 1966 and had never lost an election, abandoned his tactic of staying above the fray and not engaging Lonsdale directly. In the media and in television ads, he charged Lonsdale with hypocrisy in his environmental stand, alleging that Lonsdale had allowed his company to illegally dump toxic chemicals into the environment. Lonsdale vigorously denied the charges, which were later shown to have violated no laws, but the tactic may have stalled Lonsdale's momentum. Hatfield went on to win in all but Multnomah, Columbia, Jackson, Baker, and Lincoln counties to win by more than 7 percentage points statewide.

=== Results ===
1990 United States Senate election in Oregon
Party	Candidate	Votes	%
Republican	Mark Hatfield (incumbent)	590,095	53.68%
Democratic	Harry Lonsdale	507,743	46.19%
Write-In	Misc.	1,417	0.13%
Total votes		1,099,255	100.00%
Republican hold			

County	Mark Hatfield Republican		Harry Lonsdale Democratic	
County	%	#	%	#
Baker	49.61%	2,975	50.11%	3,005
Benton	56.25%	16,382	43.72%	12,733
Clackamas	55.76%	65,299	44.21%	51,775
Clatsop	54.35%	7,007	45.65%	5,886
Columbia	49.64%	7,620	49.88%	7,658
Coos	49.88%	11,184	49.64%	11,130
Crook	55.61%	2,930	44.30%	2,334
Curry	50.49%	4,109	49.00%	3,988
Deschutes	50.39%	14,592	49.56%	14,354
Douglas	56.44%	19,177	43.52%	14,787
Gilliam	54.49%	461	45.27%	383
Grant	53.02%	1,669	46.86%	1,475
Harney	57.46%	1,663	42.47%	1,229
Hood River	56.76%	3,395	43.24%	2,586
Jackson	48.56%	26,868	51.41%	28,447
Jefferson	53.23%	2,313	46.70%	2,029
Josephine	50.82%	12,016	49.14%	11,618
Klamath	50.52%	10,010	49.70%	9,801
Lake	54.61%	1,677	45.39%	1,394
Lane	52.29%	56,497	47.38%	50,903
Lincoln	44.23%	7,108	55.73%	8,957
Linn	60.50%	20,287	39.49%	13,241
Malheur	61.37%	4,943	38.49%	3,100
Marion	60.50%	51,242	39.17%	33,172
Morrow	56.90%	1,439	42.86%	1,084
Multnomah	49.27%	117,366	50.54%	120,408
Polk	61.39%	12,170	38.60%	7,653
Sherman	58.46%	594	41.34%	420
Tillamook	51.53%	4,892	48.41%	4,596
Umatilla	57.10%	8,926	42.89%	6,704
Union	54.70%	4,834	45.06%	3,982
Wallowa	55.31%	1,812	44.60%	1,461
Wasco	56.60%	4,978	43.39%	3,816
Washington	57.05%	68,134	42.93%	51,268
Wheeler	42.77%	340	38.87%	309
Yamhill	56.57%	13,186	43.14%	10,057

== Aftermath ==
This would be Hatfield's last term as U.S. Senator. He announced his retirement from the Senate in 1996. Despite stating that he was finished with politics following his loss to Hatfield, Lonsdale sought the Democratic nomination for Oregon's other Senate seat, held by Republican Bob Packwood in the 1992 Senate election, but lost in an extremely close and bitter primary to U.S. Congressman Les AuCoin. Lonsdale tried again for the Democratic nomination for the seat vacated by Hatfield in the 1996 Senate election, but lost by a wide margin to Mentor Graphics founder Tom Bruggere, who in turn lost to Republican Gordon Smith.
