= 2008 United States Senate election in Oregon =

- November 4, 2008
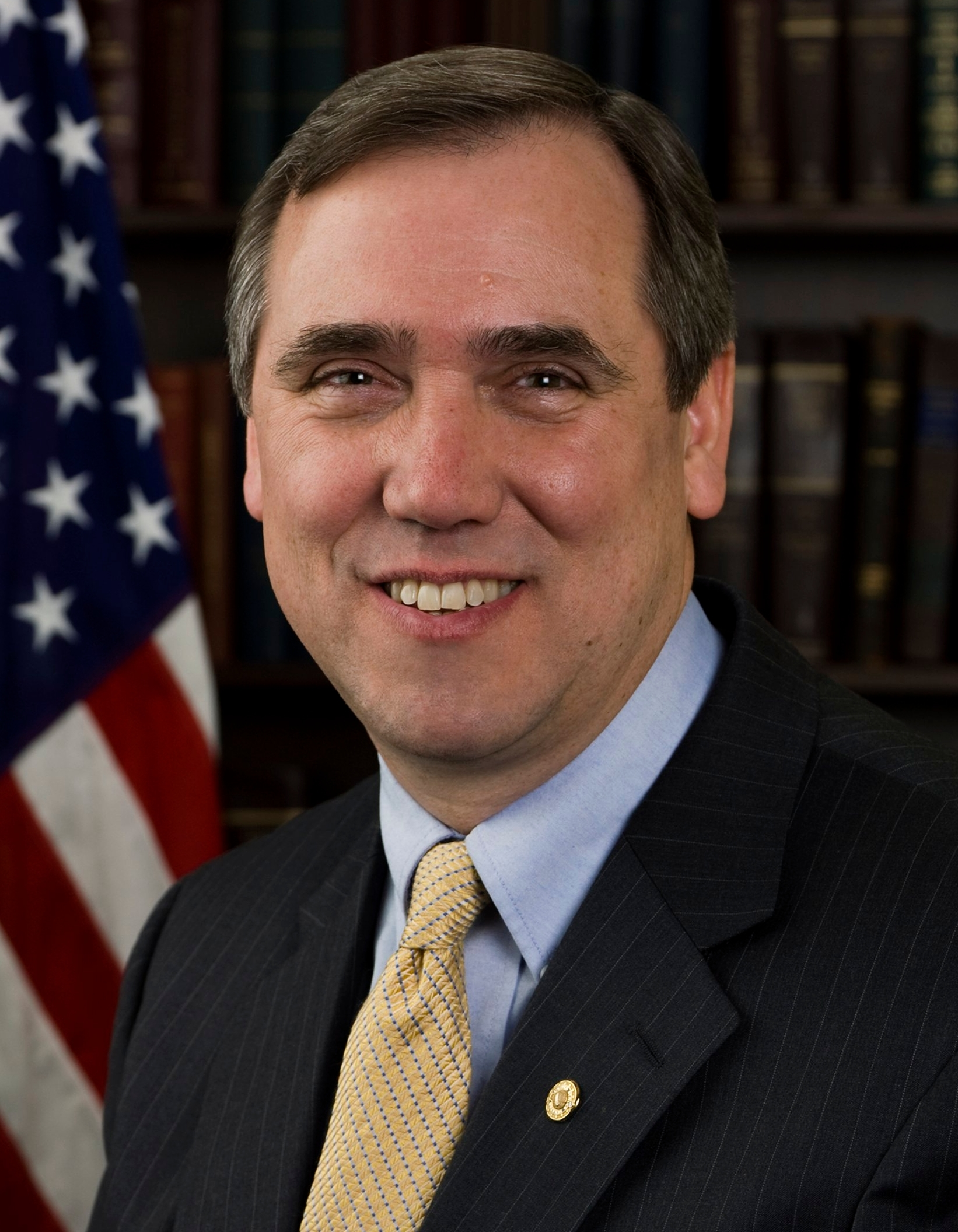

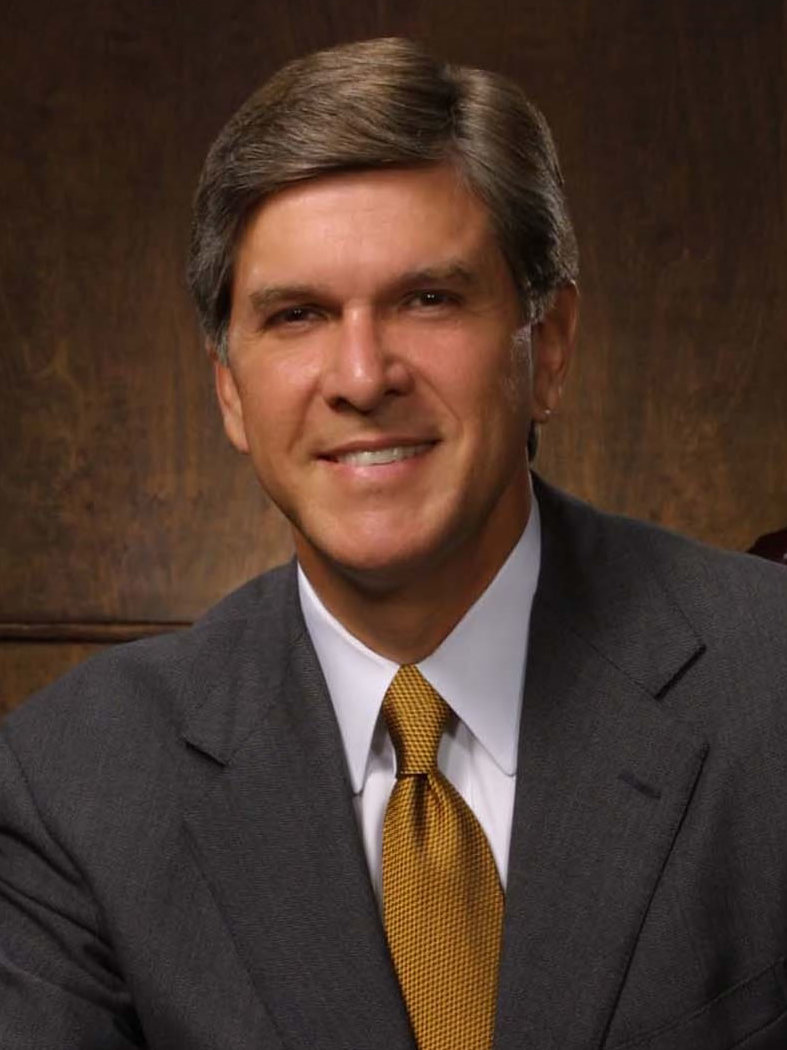

| Nominee | Jeff Merkley | Gordon Smith | David Brownlow |
| Party | Democratic | Republican | Constitution |
| Popular vote | 864,392 | 805,159 | 92,565 |
| Percentage | 48.90% | 45.55% | 5.24% |
- Merkley: 40–50% 50–60% 60–70% Smith: 40–50% 50–60% 60–70% 70–80%
U.S. senator before election
Gordon Smith
Republican
Elected U.S. Senator
Jeff Merkley
Democratic

The 2008 United States Senate election in Oregon was held on November 4, 2008, to elect a member of the United States Senate to represent the state of Oregon. Democratic speaker of the house Jeff Merkley defeated Republican two-term incumbent Gordon Smith and David Brownlow of the Constitution Party of Oregon. Merkley won by a narrow margin, with Smith not conceding until two days after the election. While Smith carried all but six counties, he could not overcome a 142,000-vote deficit in Multnomah County, home to Portland, more than double Merkley's overall margin of 58,200 votes.

Merkley became the first Democrat to win this seat since 1960, and since Smith was the only Republican holding statewide office in Oregon at the time, this was the first time since 1860 that no Republicans won or held statewide office in Oregon. Merkley's inauguration marked the first time since 1967 that Democrats held both of Oregon's United States Senate seats.

This was one of the most competitive races during the 2008 United States Senate elections, and the race was the most expensive in Oregon history. As of late October 2008, advertising related to the race exceeded $27 million, outstripping the $15 million spent on a 2007 tobacco tax ballot measure and the $14.7 million spent in the gubernatorial election of 2006. Constitution Party candidate David Brownlow was seen by some as a spoiler, as his number of votes was more than the margin between Merkley and Smith. However, Brownlow drew votes away from opponents of the Iraq War, which Smith supported. As of 2026, this is the last Oregon U.S. Senate race that was decided by a single-digit margin.

== Republican primary ==
=== Candidates ===
==== Nominee ====
- Gordon Smith, incumbent U.S. senator

==== Eliminated in primary ====
- Gordon Leitch, ophthalmologist

=== Results ===
Republican primary results
| Party | Candidate | Votes | % |
|---|---|---|---|
| Republican | Gordon Smith (incumbent) | 296,330 | 85.41% |
| Republican | Gordon Leitch | 48,560 | 14.00% |
| Republican | Write-ins | 2,068 | 0.69% |
| Total votes | | 309,943 | 100.00% |

== Democratic primary ==
=== Candidates ===
==== Nominee ====
- Jeff Merkley, speaker of the Oregon House of Representatives (2007–2009) from HD-47 (1999–2009)

==== Eliminated in primary ====
- Steve Novick, attorney
- Candy Neville, real estate broker
- Roger Obrist, construction worker
- Pavel Goberman, perennial candidate
- David Loera, doctor

==== Declined ====
- Earl Blumenauer, U.S. representative from OR-03 (1996–2025)
- Bill Bradbury, Oregon secretary of state (1999–2009)
- Peter DeFazio, U.S. representative from OR-04 (1987–2023)
- Darlene Hooley, U.S. representative from OR-05 (1997–2009)
- John Kitzhaber, former governor of Oregon (1995–2003)

=== Campaign ===
In the Democratic primary, although Democrats held all statewide offices in Oregon, there was no clear Democratic challenger; former Oregon Gov. John Kitzhaber indicated early on that he was not interested. In January 2007, while the campaign was still in its infancy, Portland lawyer and political activist Steve Novick wrote a lengthy critique of Gordon Smith's record in the Portland Willamette Week. The article outlined a strategy to beat Smith, who Novick argued was actually more vulnerable than appeared. On April 18, 2007, Novick formally announced his candidacy for Senate.

By the end of May, both Congressmen Earl Blumenauer and Peter DeFazio had announced they were not interested in entering the race, depleting what was considered by many the "first-tier" list of candidates for the position leaving Democrats searching for more candidates. With no high-profile Democrats in the race, it was believed by that the most likely candidates would come from the state legislature. Since the legislature was still in session at the time it was considered unlikely that any prominent lawmakers would jump into the race until the end of June or later. Of those, Jeff Merkley, then Speaker of the Oregon House of Representatives was considered to be the most likely to challenge Smith due to rumors that he had been in talks with the Democratic Senatorial Campaign Committee (DSCC).

The rumors that Merkley was being courted by the DSCC were confirmed when it was reported that he had travelled to the East Coast to discuss a possible run at the invitation of Senator Charles Schumer of New York, who as chairman of the DSCC was in charge of recruiting possible challengers to take on Smith. Around the same time, State Senator Alan Bates from Jackson County was reported to be contemplating running for the Democratic nomination. Eventually Bates decided against running and on August 1, 2007, Merkley filed papers, officially entering the race.

Merkley and Novick gave back-to-back speeches at the yearly summit of the Democratic Party of Oregon in Sunriver. There Novick threw a political jab, challenging Merkley's statements that he had been an opponent of the war from the start by pointing to his support of a Republican-drafted non-binding resolution in 2003, two days after the invasion began, that praised President Bush for the invasion of Iraq and the efforts of the troops and prayed for their safety. The critique drew noticeably negative reactions from the crowd and Merkley won a straw poll at the summit with 103 votes to Novick's 50.

Merkley went on to dismiss the criticism, pointing out that Legislative resolutions carry no force of law and are only statements of principle, that a legislator could freely pick and choose which parts of the resolution to support, and that he made clear that "you stand up and clarify what parts you're supporting and what parts you're opposed to and I did that more clearly than any member on the floor of the House."

By the end of November 2007, six Democratic candidates had filed papers to run for the seat: Novick, Merkley, real estate agent Candy Neville of Eugene, retired mental health counselor David Loera of Salem, retired construction worker Roger Obrist of Damascus, and perennial candidate Pavel Goberman of Beaverton. Some pointed discussions ensued among the candidates over a debate schedule and formats.

On January 22, 2008, four of the Democratic candidates had their first debate in Pendleton, Oregon hosted by the East Oregonian newspaper.

Merkley went on to defeat Novick and the four other candidates in the Democratic primary on May 20, 2008.

=== Results ===
Results by county, Democratic primary: Jeff Merkley: 50–55% 45–50% 40–45% 35–40% 30–35%; Steve Novick: 50–55% 45–50% 40–45%

Democratic primary results
| Party | Candidate | Votes | % |
|---|---|---|---|
| Democratic | Jeff Merkley | 246,482 | 44.82% |
| Democratic | Steve Novick | 230,889 | 41.98% |
| Democratic | Candy Neville | 38,367 | 6.98% |
| Democratic | Roger S. Obrist | 12,647 | 2.30% |
| Democratic | Pavel Goberman | 12,056 | 2.19% |
| Democratic | David Loera | 6,127 | 1.11% |
| Democratic | Write-ins | 3,398 | 0.62% |
| Total votes | | 549,966 | 100.00% |

== Constitution primary ==
=== Candidates ===
==== Nominee ====
- David Brownlow

== General election ==
=== Predictions ===
| Source | Ranking | As of |
|---|---|---|
| The Cook Political Report | Tossup | October 23, 2008 |
| CQ Politics | Tossup | October 31, 2008 |
| Rothenberg Political Report | Lean D (flip) | November 2, 2008 |
| Real Clear Politics | Tossup | October 30, 2008 |

=== Fundraising ===
Campaign finance reports as of December 31, 2008
| Candidate | Raised | Spent | Cash on hand |
|---|---|---|---|
| Gordon Smith (R) | $13,609,610 | $13,941,337 | $75,663 |
| Jeff Merkley (D) | $6,512,231 | $6,501,315 | $11,226 |
Source: Federal Election Commission

=== Polling ===
Aggregate polls

| Source of poll aggregation | Dates administered | Dates updated | Gordon Smith (R) | Jeff Merkley (D) | Other/Undecided (Note: Calculated by taking the difference of 100% and all other candidates combined.) | Margin |
|---|---|---|---|---|---|---|
| RealClearPolitics | October 23 – October 30, 2008 | October 30, 2008 | 42.5% | 47.8% | 9.7% | Merkley +5.3% |
| Rasmussen Reports | February 13 – October 30, 2008 | October 30, 2008 | 46.0% | 47.0% | 7.0% | Merkley +1.0% |
| Average | | | 44.3% | 47.4% | 8.3% | Merkley +3.1% |

| Poll source | Date(s) administered | Sample size (Note: Key: A – all adults RV – registered voters LV – likely voters V – unclear) | Margin of error | Gordon Smith (R) | Jeff Merkley (D) | Dave Brownlow (C) | Other | Undecided |
|---|---|---|---|---|---|---|---|---|
| Rasmussen Reports | October 30, 2008 | 500 (LV) | ± 4.5% | 46% | 49% | – | 4% (Note: "Some other candidate" with 4%.) | 1% |
| Public Policy Polling (D) | October 28–30, 2008 | 1,424 (LV) | ± 2.6% | 43% | 51% | 4% | – | 2% |
| Research 2000 | October 27–29, 2008 | 600 (LV) | ± 4.0% | 42% | 48% | – | 5% | 5% |
| SurveyUSA (Note: Poll sponsored by KATU-TV Portland) | October 25–26, 2008 | 672 (LV) | ± 3.9% | 42% | 49% | 5% | – | 4% |
| Davis, Hibbitts & Midghall Inc. | October 23–25, 2008 | 500 (LV) | ± 4.4% | 40% | 45% | 3% | – | 12% |
| Riley Research & Association | October 10–20, 2008 | 499 (RV) | ± 4.4% | 35% | 36% | 4% | – | 25% |
| Research 2000 | October 14–15, 2008 | 600 (LV) | ± 4.0% | 41% | 47% | – | 6% | 6% |
| Rasmussen Reports | October 14, 2008 | – | – | 47% | 47% | – | – | 6% |
| SurveyUSA | October 11–12, 2008 | 584 (LV) | ± 4.1% | 41% | 46% | 7% | – | 6% |
| Research 2000 | September 22–24, 2008 | 600 (LV) | ± 4.0% | 40% | 45% | – | 6% | 9% |
| SurveyUSA (Note: Poll sponsored by KATU-TV Portland and Roll Call Newspaper, Capital Hill) | September 22–23, 2008 | 708 (LV) | ± 3.8% | 42% | 44% | 8% | – | 6% |
| Rasmussen Reports | September 15, 2008 | 700 (LV) | ± 4.0% | 46% | 45% | – | – | 9% |
| Davis, Hibbitts & Midghall Inc. (Note: Poll sponsored by KATU-TV Portland and FOX 12) | September 11–14, 2008 | 500 (LV) | ± 4.4% | 42% | 39% | – | – | 19% |
| Benenson Strategy Group (D) (Note: Poll sponsored by Merkley's campaign) | September 7–9, 2008 | 702 (LV) | ± 3.7% | 41% | 43% | 6% | – | 10% |
| Benenson Strategy Group (D) | August 15, 2008 | – (LV) | – | 47% | 38% | 4% | – | 11% |
| Rasmussen Reports | August 7, 2008 | 500 (LV) | ± 4.5% | 47% | 39% | – | 5% | 9% |
| Rasmussen Reports | August 7, 2008 | 500 (LV) | ± 4.5% | 50% (Note: Leaners included) | 44% | – | 1% | 6% |
| SurveyUSA | August 2–4, 2008 | 629 (LV) | ± 4.0% | 49% | 37% | 8% | – | 6% |
| Rasmussen Reports | July 15, 2008 | 500 (LV) | ± 4.5% | 41% | 43% | – | 4% | 11% |
| Benenson Strategy Group (D) | June 15, 2008 | – (LV) | – | 48% | 38% | 4% | – | 9% |
| Rasmussen Reports | June 11, 2008 | 500 (LV) | ± 4.0% | 47% | 38% | – | 8% | 7% |
| U.S. Chamber of Commerce (R) | May 27–29, 2008 | 300 (LV) | – | 38% | 34% | – | 11% (Note: Frohnmayer with 11%) | 16% |
| Feldman Group (D) (Note: Poll sponsored by the DSCC) | May 12–16, 2008 | 800 (LV) | – | 45% | 42% | – | – | 14% |
| Rasmussen Reports | May 7, 2008 | 500 (LV) | ± 4.0% | 45% | 42% | – | 4% | 9% |
| Rasmussen Reports | March 25, 2008 | 500 (LV) | – | 47% | 34% | – | – | 19% |
| Rasmussen Reports | February 13, 2008 | 500 (LV) | – | 48% | 30% | – | – | 22% |
| Riley Research Associates | November 30–December 12, 2007 | 401 (LV) | ± 4.9% | 39% | 12% | – | 14% (Note: Independent John Frohnmayer with 14%) | 35% |
| SurveyUSA (Note: Poll sponsored by Roll Call Newspaper and Capitol Hill) | October 24–30, 2007 | 641 (RV) | ± 4.0% | 48% | 39% | – | – | 13% |
| Riley Research & Associates | August 10–15, 2007 | 406 (LV) | ± 4.9% | 38% | 19% | – | 7% (Note: Independent John Frohnmayer with 7%) | 36% |

Hypothetical polling

Gordon Smith vs. Peter DeFazio

| Poll source | Date(s) administered | Sample size | Margin of error | Gordon Smith (R) | Peter DeFazio (D) | Undecided |
|---|---|---|---|---|---|---|
| Grove Insight (D) | February 2007 | – (LV) | ± 4.0% | 38% | 42% | 20% |

Gordon Smith vs. Steve Novick

| Poll source | Date(s) administered | Sample size | Margin of error | Gordon Smith (R) | Steve Novick (D) | Other | Undecided |
|---|---|---|---|---|---|---|---|
| Rasmussen Reports | May 7, 2008 | 500 (LV) | ± 4.0% | 47% | 41% | 4% | 9% |
| Rasmussen Reports | February 13, 2008 | 500 (LV) | – | 48% | 35% | – | 22% |
| SurveyUSA | October 24–30, 2007 | 641 (RV) | ± 4.0% | 45% | 39% | – | 16% |
| Lake Research Partners (D) (Note: Poll sponsored by Novick's campaign) | July 7–11, 2007 | 500 (LV) | – | 50% | 27% | – | 23% |

== Results ==
2008 United States Senate election in Oregon
| Party | Candidate | Votes | % | ±% |
|---|---|---|---|---|
| Democratic | Jeff Merkley | 864,392 | 48.90% | +9.30% |
| Republican | Gordon Smith (incumbent) | 805,159 | 45.55% | −10.66% |
| Constitution | David Brownlow | 92,565 | 5.24% | +3.52% |
| Write-in | | 5,388 | 0.30% | +0.19% |
| Total votes | | 1,767,504 | 100.00% | N/A |
| Democratic gain from Republican | | | | |

=== By county ===
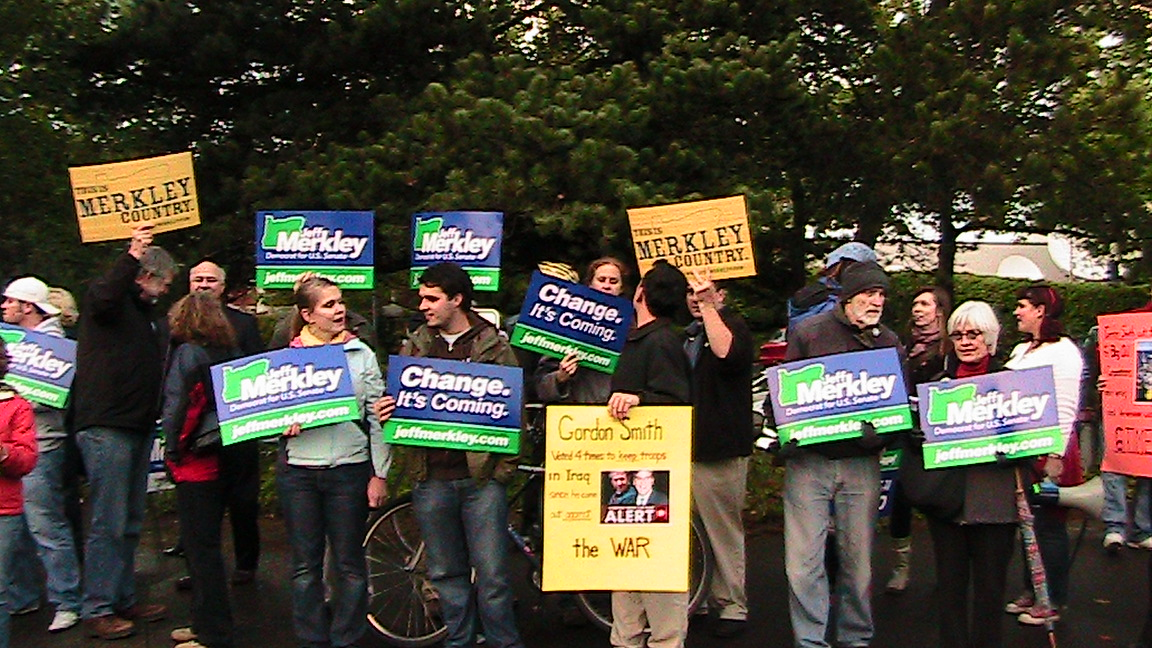
Merkley supporters at a campaign rally

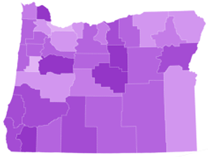
Brownlow's performance by county: List: 8-9% 7-8% 6-7% 5-6% 4-5% 3-4%

| County | Jeff Merkley Democratic | | Gordon Smith Republican | | David Brownlow Constitution | | Various candidates Other parties | | Margin | | Total |
| County | # | % | # | % | # | % | # | % | # | % | Total |
|---|---|---|---|---|---|---|---|---|---|---|---|
| Baker | 2,203 | 25.82% | 5,662 | 66.37% | 652 | 7.64% | 14 | 0.16% | -3,459 | -40.55% | 8,531 |
| Benton | 24,911 | 55.89% | 17,933 | 40.23% | 1,567 | 3.52% | 163 | 0.37% | 6,978 | 15.66% | 44,574 |
| Clackamas | 83,558 | 45.00% | 92,780 | 49.97% | 8,851 | 4.77% | 479 | 0.26% | -9,222 | -4.97% | 185,668 |
| Clatsop | 8,795 | 49.28% | 7,939 | 44.48% | 1,062 | 5.95% | 52 | 0.29% | 865 | 4.80% | 17,848 |
| Columbia | 11,166 | 46.46% | 10,679 | 44.44% | 2,091 | 8.70% | 95 | 0.40% | 487 | 2.02% | 24,031 |
| Coos | 12,621 | 42.29% | 14,838 | 49.72% | 2,319 | 7.77% | 67 | 0.22% | -2,217 | -7.43% | 29,845 |
| Crook | 2,735 | 27.33% | 6,436 | 64.31% | 804 | 8.03% | 32 | 0.32% | -3701 | -36.98% | 10,007 |
| Curry | 4,410 | 36.88% | 6,679 | 55.86% | 843 | 7.05% | 25 | 0.21% | -2,269 | -18.98% | 11,957 |
| Deschutes | 31,024 | 40.59% | 41,108 | 53.78% | 4,113 | 5.38% | 197 | 0.26% | -10,084 | -13.19% | 76,442 |
| Douglas | 17,387 | 34.02% | 29,969 | 58.63% | 3,626 | 7.09% | 130 | 0.25% | -12,582 | -24.61% | 51,112 |
| Gilliam | 302 | 27.94% | 699 | 64.66% | 78 | 7.22% | 2 | 0.19% | -397 | -36.72% | 1,081 |
| Grant | 748 | 19.65% | 2,821 | 74.12% | 232 | 6.10% | 5 | 0.13% | -2,073 | -54.47% | 3,806 |
| Harney | 755 | 21.11% | 2,574 | 71.98% | 242 | 6.77% | 5 | 0.14% | -1,819 | -50.87% | 3,576 |
| Hood River | 5,045 | 52.90% | 4,070 | 42.68% | 423 | 4.23% | 18 | 0.19% | 975 | 10.22% | 9,536 |
| Jackson | 41,828 | 42.94% | 49,225 | 50.53% | 6,071 | 6.23% | 296 | 0.30% | -7,397 | -7.59% | 97,420 |
| Jefferson | 2,705 | 33.48% | 4,788 | 59.26% | 564 | 6.98% | 22 | 0.27% | -2083 | -25.78% | 8,079 |
| Josephine | 14,153 | 34.97% | 22,790 | 56.30% | 3,409 | 8.42% | 125 | 0.31% | -8,637 | -21.33% | 40,477 |
| Klamath | 7,005 | 24.58% | 19,241 | 67.51% | 2,152 | 7.55% | 104 | 0.36% | -12,236 | -42.93% | 28,502 |
| Lake | 2,697 | 74.79% | 668 | 18.52% | 234 | 6.49% | 7 | 0.19% | -2,029 | -56.27% | 3,606 |
| Lane | 103,631 | 58.09% | 66,936 | 37.52% | 7,393 | 4.14% | 449 | 0.25% | 36,695 | 20.57% | 178,409 |
| Lincoln | 12,097 | 52.13% | 9,464 | 40.78% | 1,598 | 6.89% | 47 | 0.20% | 2,633 | 11.35% | 23,206 |
| Linn | 18,403 | 36.94% | 27,047 | 54.29% | 4,180 | 8.39% | 192 | 0.39% | -8,644 | -17.35% | 49,822 |
| Malheur | 2,218 | 22.08% | 7,355 | 73.21% | 469 | 4.67% | 5 | 0.05% | -5,137 | -51.13% | 10,047 |
| Marion | 49,626 | 41.02% | 62,560 | 51.71% | 8,359 | 6.91% | 441 | 0.36% | -12,934 | -10.69% | 120,098 |
| Morrow | 988 | 24.63% | 2,751 | 68.57% | 266 | 6.63% | 7 | 0.17% | -1,763 | -43.94% | 4,012 |
| Multnomah | 242,518 | 68.87% | 95,950 | 27.25% | 12,410 | 3.52% | 1,284 | 0.36% | 146,568 | 41.62% | 352,162 |
| Polk | 13,906 | 39.77% | 18,718 | 53.53% | 2,195 | 6.28% | 147 | 0.42% | -4,812 | -13.76% | 34,966 |
| Sherman | 277 | 27.08% | 685 | 66.96% | 54 | 5.28% | 7 | 0.68% | -408 | -39.88% | 1,023 |
| Tillamook | 5,540 | 42.89% | 6,516 | 50.44% | 826 | 6.39% | 36 | 0.28% | -976 | -7.55% | 12,918 |
| Umatilla | 5,948 | 23.80% | 17,933 | 71.14% | 1,068 | 4.27% | 47 | 0.19% | -11,985 | -47.34% | 24,996 |
| Union | 3,329 | 27.15% | 8,230 | 67.13% | 676 | 5.51% | 25 | 0.20% | -4,901 | -39.98% | 12,260 |
| Wallowa | 940 | 21.62% | 3,226 | 74.20% | 177 | 4.07% | 5 | 0.11% | -2,286 | -52.58% | 4,348 |
| Wasco | 4,586 | 41.36% | 5,762 | 51.96% | 718 | 6.47% | 23 | 0.21% | -1,176 | -10.60% | 11,089 |
| Washington | 111,367 | 48.84% | 106,114 | 46.53% | 9,886 | 4.34% | 678 | 0,30% | 5,253 | 2.31% | 228,045 |
| Wheeler | 212 | 26.80% | 509 | 64.35% | 68 | 8.60% | 2 | 0.25% | -297 | -37.55% | 701 |
| Yamhill | 16,787 | 39.66% | 22,475 | 53.10% | 2,909 | 6.87% | 155 | 0.37% | -5,688 | -13.44% | 42,326 |
| Totals | 864,392 | 48.90% | 805,159 | 45.55% | 92,565 | 5.24% | 5,388 | 0.30% | 59233 | 3.35% | 1,767,504 |

Counties that flipped from Republican to Democratic

- Clatsop (largest city: Astoria)
- Columbia (largest city: St. Helens)
- Hood River (largest city: Hood River)
- Lane (largest city: Eugene)
- Lincoln (largest city: Newport)
- Benton (largest city: Corvallis)
- Washington (largest city: Hillsboro)

== See also ==
- List of United States senators from Oregon
- 2008 United States Senate elections
- 2008 Oregon legislative election
- 2008 United States presidential election in Oregon

== Notes ==
Partisan clients
