= Marmot Construction Works =

Reforestation cooperative

Marmot Construction Works, Inc.
- Company type: Cooperative
- Founded: 1976
- Defunct: 1985
- Services: Reforestation

Marmot Construction Works, Inc. was a worker-managed reforestation cooperative based in Seattle and Bellingham, Washington active from 1976-1985.

== History ==
Marmot was founded in 1976 by four people who had previously worked together on trail maintenance. The company was able to be established after a friend of one of the founders put a $200,000 inheritance in escrow to serve as a surety bond. Marmot developed capital as it acquired contracts and members bought shares of the company. During its history, Marmot struggled with deciding whether to orient towards being an urban or rural company. It maintained offices in Seattle and Bellingham.

Marmot was part of a larger network of forestry cooperatives in the Pacific Northwest known as the Northwest Forest Workers Association. The company dissolved in 1985 during the timber industry recession.

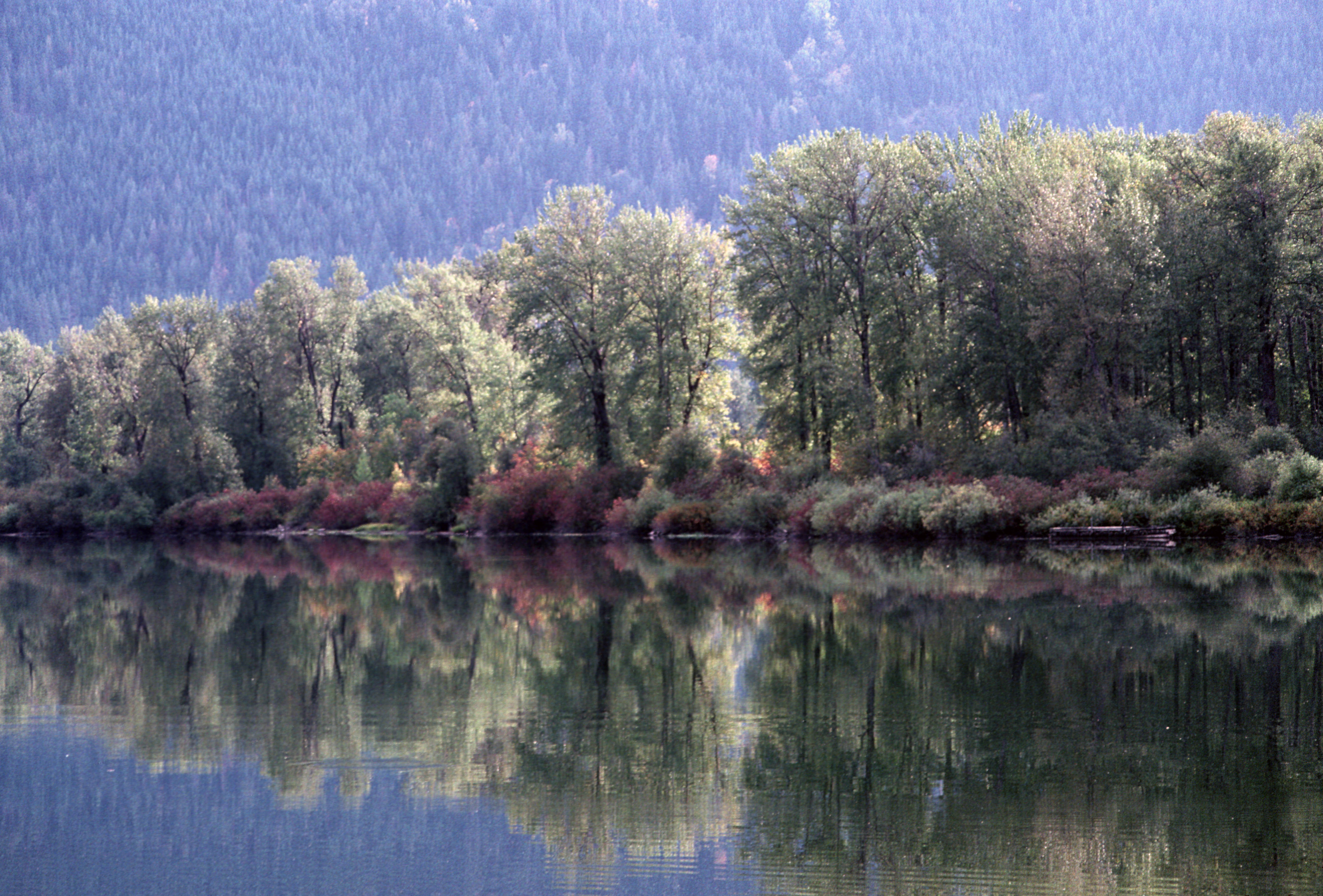
Forest surrounding Lake Wenatchee, one of the areas where Marmot operated.

== Management ==
Economist Christopher Eaton Gunn described Marmot as "a conventional corporation with co-op bylaws." Marmot's structures mirrored a traditional corporation, but its internal operation was controlled collectively. Workers were allowed to become members after a trial period of several months of work, and all major company decisions were voted on by members at monthly meetings. Smaller day-to-day decisions were made by designated committees. Though members were required to own a share of stock, it was their status as a member of the co-op that allowed them to participate in company decisions. At its height, Marmot had around thirty worker-owners.

According to Gunn, Marmot placed a greater emphasis on member education than other similar cooperatives at the time. New members were tasked with reading a packet about worker self-management and the history of the organization. Workers were also required to read information about forestry, tree planting, and safety. Marmot also focused its efforts on recruiting women as leaders to gain skills in forestry and maintained a gender balance in its workforce.

== See also ==
- Hoedad's Reforestation Cooperative
