= 1982 Oregon gubernatorial election =

- November 2, 1982
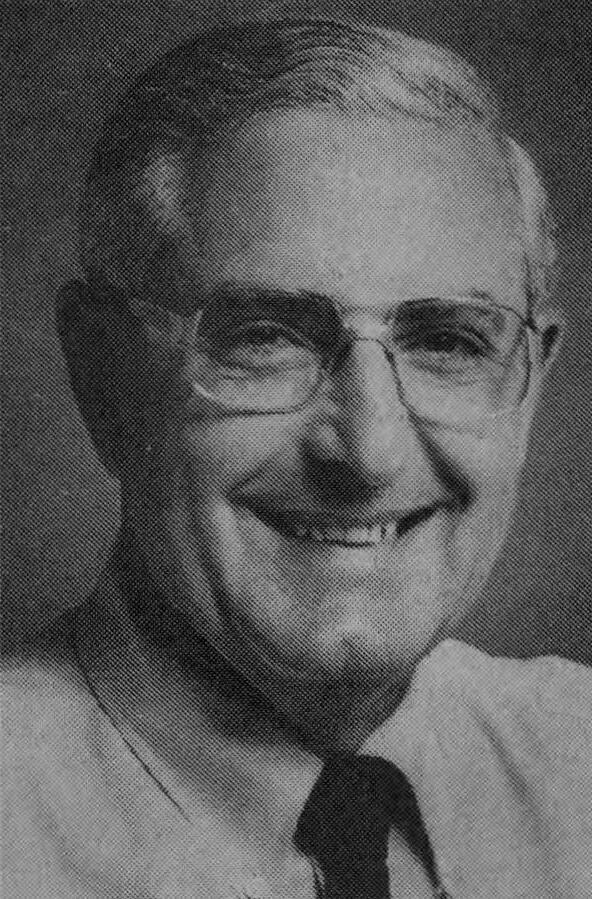

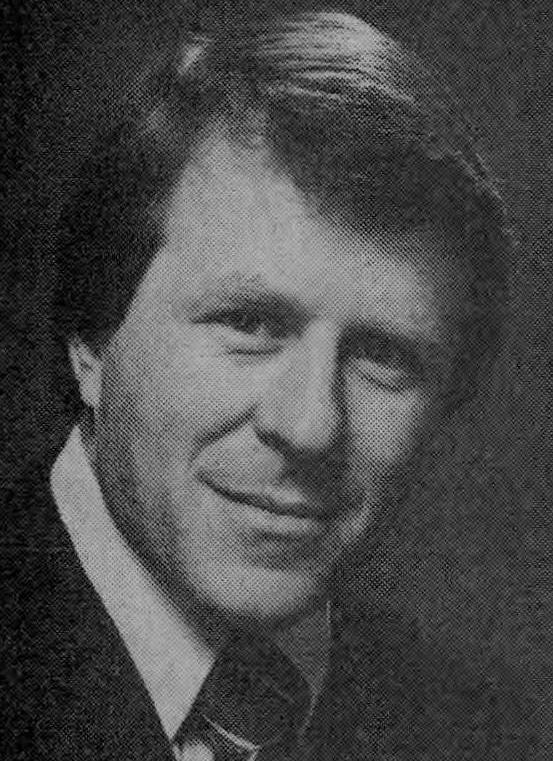
| Nominee | Victor Atiyeh | Ted Kulongoski |
| Party | Republican | Democratic |
| Popular vote | 639,841 | 374,316 |
| Percentage | 61.40% | 35.92% |
- County results Atiyeh: 50–60% 60–70% 70–80%
Governor before election
Victor Atiyeh
Republican
Elected Governor
Victor Atiyeh
Republican

The 1982 Oregon gubernatorial election took place on November 2, 1982. Incumbent Republican Governor Victor Atiyeh won re-election to a second term in a landslide, defeating Democratic state senator Ted Kulongoski and carrying every county in the state. To date, this is the last time that a Republican was elected Governor of Oregon, and the most recent gubernatorial election in which every county voted for the same nominee. Twenty years later, Kulongoski was elected governor and served two terms.

== Primary election ==
Oregon held primary elections on May 18, 1982.

=== Republican party ===
==== Candidates ====
- Victor G. Atiyeh, incumbent governor
- Bruce Broussard
- Cliff Everett, timber grower
- Walter Huss, former Chair of the Oregon Republican Party
- John Michael Wiley Todd

==== Results ====
Republican primary results
| Party | Candidate | Votes | % |
|---|---|---|---|
| Republican | Victor G. Atiyeh (inc.) | 208,333 | 82.41% |
| Republican | Cliff Everett | 17,741 | 7.02% |
| Republican | Walter Huss | 16,892 | 6.68% |
| Republican | Bruce Broussard | 5,173 | 2.05% |
| Republican | John Michael Wiley Todd | 3,891 | 1.54% |
| Republican | Ted Kulongoski (write-in) | 441 | 0.17% |
| Republican | Don Clark (write-in) | 127 | 0.05% |
| Republican | Jerry Rust (write-in) | 60 | 0.02% |
| Republican | Archie Weinstein (write-in) | 36 | 0.01% |
| Republican | Stan Terry (write-in) | 15 | 0.01% |
| Republican | Steve Anderson (write-in) | 5 | 0.00% |
| Republican | E. Allen Propst (write-in) | 4 | 0.00% |
| Republican | Scattering | 80 | 0.03% |
| Total votes | | 252,798 | 100.00% |

=== Democratic party ===
==== Candidates ====
- Steve Anderson
- Don Clark, Multnomah County commissioner
- Ted Kulongoski, labor lawyer and Oregon state senator and nominee for U.S. Senate in 1980
- E. Allen Propst, perennial candidate
- Jerry Rust, Lane County commissioner
- Stan Terry, business owner
- Archie Weinstein, former Lane County commissioner
- M. A. Yegge

==== Results ====
Democratic primary results
| Party | Candidate | Votes | % |
|---|---|---|---|
| Democratic | Ted Kulongoski | 186,580 | 59.54% |
| Democratic | Don Clark | 60,850 | 19.42% |
| Democratic | Jerry Rust | 22,962 | 7.33% |
| Democratic | Archie Weinstein | 12,624 | 4.03% |
| Democratic | E. Allen Propst | 10,245 | 3.27% |
| Democratic | Stan Terry | 9,922 | 3.17% |
| Democratic | Steve Anderson | 7,480 | 2.39% |
| Democratic | M. A. Yegge | 1,825 | 0.58% |
| Democratic | Victor G. Atiyeh (write-in) | 735 | 0.23% |
| Democratic | Walter Huss (write-in) | 78 | 0.23% |
| Democratic | Cliff Everett (write-in) | 13 | 0.00% |
| Democratic | Bruce Broussard (write-in) | 2 | 0.00% |
| Democratic | Scattering | 60 | 0.02% |
| Total votes | | 313,376 | 100.00% |

== General election ==
=== Candidates ===
- Victor G. Atiyeh, Republican
- Ted Kulongoski, Democratic
- Paul Cleveland, Libertarian

=== Results ===
1982 Oregon gubernatorial election
| Party | Candidate | Votes | % | ±% |
|---|---|---|---|---|
| Republican | Victor G. Atiyeh (inc.) | 639,841 | 61.40% | +6.70% |
| Democratic | Ted Kulongoski | 374,316 | 35.92% | −9.01% |
| Libertarian | Paul Cleveland | 27,394 | 2.63% | |
| Write-in | Scattering | 458 | 0.04% | |
| Total votes | | 1,042,009 | 100.00% | |
| Majority | | 265,525 | 25.48% | |
| Republican hold | | Swing | +15.71% | |

=== Results by county ===
As of 2026, this is the most recent gubernatorial election in which a Republican has carried Benton County, Lane County, Lincoln County, and Multnomah County. Additionally, Clatsop County has voted Republican only once since this election. (Note: In 2014)

| County | Victor G. Atiyeh Republican | | Ted Kulongoski Democratic | | Paul Cleveland Libertarian | | Scattering Write-in | | Margin | | Total votes cast |
| County | # | % | # | % | # | % | # | % | # | % | Total votes cast |
|---|---|---|---|---|---|---|---|---|---|---|---|
| Baker | 4,628 | 67.41% | 2,065 | 30.08% | 172 | 2.51% | 0 | 0.00% | 2,563 | 37.33% | 6,865 |
| Benton | 18,739 | 65.35% | 9,277 | 32.35% | 641 | 2.24% | 17 | 0.06% | 9,462 | 33.00% | 28,674 |
| Clackamas | 65,755 | 64.03% | 33,897 | 33.01% | 3,013 | 2.93% | 28 | 0.03% | 31,858 | 31.02% | 102,693 |
| Clatsop | 8,264 | 61.47% | 4,929 | 36.66% | 248 | 1.84% | 4 | 0.03% | 3,335 | 24.80% | 13,445 |
| Columbia | 8,112 | 56.89% | 5,825 | 40.85% | 320 | 2.24% | 3 | 0.02% | 2,287 | 16.04% | 14,260 |
| Coos | 12,448 | 52.27% | 10,577 | 44.41% | 787 | 3.30% | 5 | 0.02% | 1,871 | 7.86% | 23,817 |
| Crook | 3,425 | 68.75% | 1,452 | 29.14% | 100 | 2.01% | 5 | 0.10% | 1,973 | 39.60% | 4,982 |
| Curry | 4,583 | 60.37% | 2,729 | 35.95% | 278 | 3.66% | 1 | 0.01% | 1,854 | 24.42% | 7,591 |
| Deschutes | 16,712 | 70.02% | 6,545 | 27.42% | 605 | 2.53% | 6 | 0.03% | 10,167 | 42.60% | 23,868 |
| Douglas | 19,854 | 59.26% | 12,497 | 37.30% | 1,146 | 3.42% | 7 | 0.02% | 7,357 | 21.96% | 33,504 |
| Gilliam | 745 | 75.18% | 235 | 23.71% | 11 | 1.11% | 0 | 0.00% | 510 | 51.46% | 991 |
| Grant | 2,319 | 66.68% | 1,057 | 30.39% | 102 | 2.93% | 0 | 0.00% | 1,262 | 36.29% | 3,478 |
| Harney | 2,100 | 68.01% | 918 | 29.73% | 68 | 2.20% | 2 | 0.06% | 1,182 | 36.29% | 3,088 |
| Hood River | 4,029 | 66.14% | 1,925 | 31.60% | 137 | 2.25% | 1 | 0.02% | 2,104 | 34.54% | 6,092 |
| Jackson | 32,459 | 62.64% | 17,857 | 34.46% | 1,484 | 2.86% | 17 | 0.03% | 14,602 | 28.18% | 51,817 |
| Jefferson | 3,068 | 72.09% | 1,090 | 25.61% | 96 | 2.26% | 2 | 0.05% | 1,978 | 46.48% | 4,256 |
| Josephine | 14,917 | 66.82% | 6,448 | 28.89% | 953 | 4.27% | 5 | 0.02% | 8,469 | 37.94% | 22,323 |
| Klamath | 14,322 | 66.27% | 6,492 | 30.04% | 786 | 3.64% | 10 | 0.05% | 7,830 | 36.23% | 21,610 |
| Lake | 2,120 | 67.15% | 940 | 29.78% | 97 | 3.07% | 0 | 0.00% | 1,180 | 37.38% | 3,157 |
| Lane | 53,776 | 51.74% | 47,855 | 46.04% | 2,273 | 2.19% | 31 | 0.03% | 5,921 | 5.70% | 103,935 |
| Lincoln | 9,123 | 59.53% | 5,693 | 37.15% | 505 | 3.30% | 4 | 0.03% | 3,430 | 22.38% | 15,325 |
| Linn | 21,214 | 63.68% | 11,280 | 33.86% | 819 | 2.46% | 3 | 0.01% | 9,934 | 29.82% | 33,316 |
| Malheur | 6,496 | 73.59% | 2,115 | 23.96% | 216 | 2.45% | 0 | 0.00% | 4,381 | 49.63% | 8,827 |
| Marion | 50,374 | 65.80% | 24,246 | 31.67% | 1,864 | 2.43% | 69 | 0.09% | 26,128 | 34.13% | 76,553 |
| Morrow | 1,665 | 64.39% | 834 | 32.25% | 87 | 3.36% | 0 | 0.00% | 831 | 32.13% | 2,586 |
| Multnomah | 128,961 | 55.60% | 97,322 | 41.96% | 5,468 | 2.36% | 185 | 0.08% | 31,639 | 13.64% | 231,936 |
| Polk | 12,300 | 65.80% | 5,851 | 31.30% | 537 | 2.87% | 6 | 0.03% | 6,449 | 34.50% | 18,694 |
| Sherman | 823 | 71.82% | 299 | 26.09% | 24 | 2.09% | 0 | 0.00% | 524 | 45.72% | 1,146 |
| Tillamook | 5,485 | 58.76% | 3,609 | 38.67% | 238 | 2.55% | 2 | 0.02% | 1,876 | 20.10% | 9,334 |
| Umatilla | 11,909 | 66.53% | 5,589 | 31.22% | 401 | 2.24% | 1 | 0.01% | 6,320 | 35.31% | 17,900 |
| Union | 5,796 | 62.89% | 3,193 | 34.65% | 225 | 2.44% | 2 | 0.02% | 2,603 | 28.24% | 9,216 |
| Wallowa | 2,271 | 70.05% | 889 | 27.42% | 82 | 2.53% | 0 | 0.00% | 1,382 | 42.63% | 3,242 |
| Wasco | 5,644 | 58.60% | 3,744 | 38.87% | 239 | 2.48% | 4 | 0.04% | 1,900 | 19.73% | 9,631 |
| Washington | 71,024 | 69.52% | 28,470 | 27.87% | 2,631 | 2.58% | 35 | 0.03% | 42,554 | 41.65% | 102,160 |
| Wheeler | 440 | 66.57% | 204 | 30.86% | 17 | 2.57% | 0 | 0.00% | 236 | 35.70% | 661 |
| Yamhill | 13,941 | 66.27% | 6,368 | 30.27% | 724 | 3.44% | 3 | 0.01% | 7,573 | 36.00% | 21,036 |
| Total | 639,841 | 61.40% | 374,316 | 35.92% | 27,394 | 2.63% | 458 | 0.04% | 265,525 | 25.48% | 1,042,009 |

==== Counties that flipped from Democratic to Republican ====
- Columbia
- Lane
- Multnomah
