= 2002 United States Senate election in Oregon =

- November 5, 2002
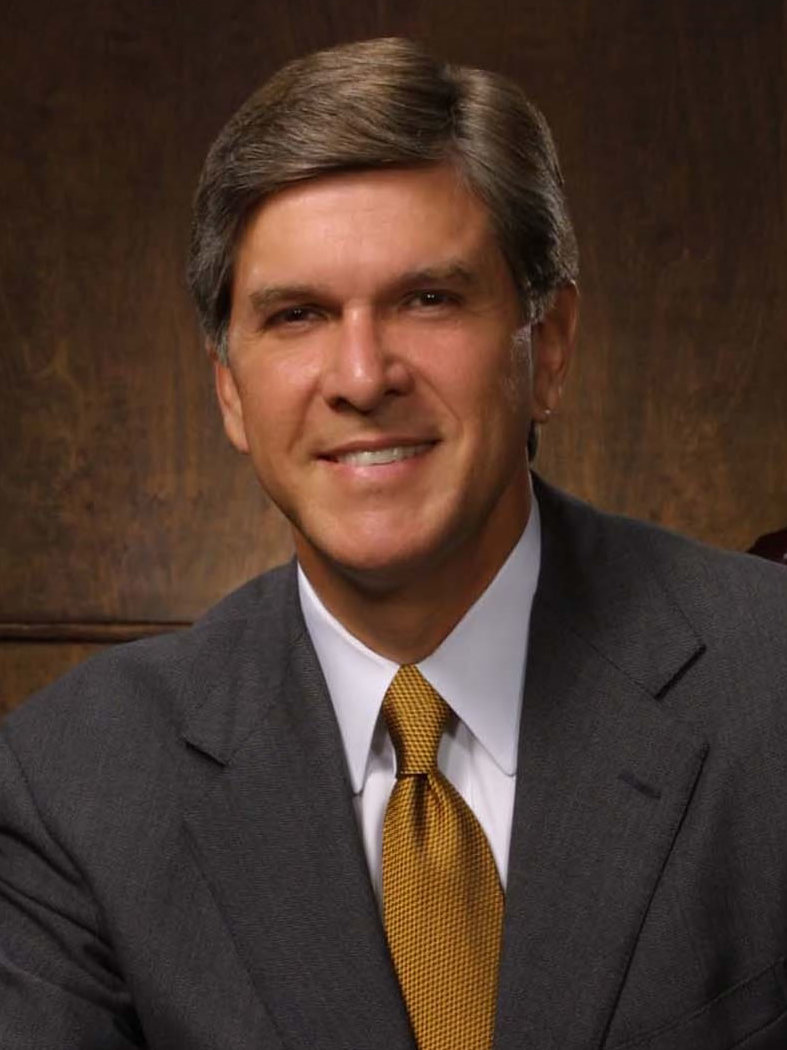

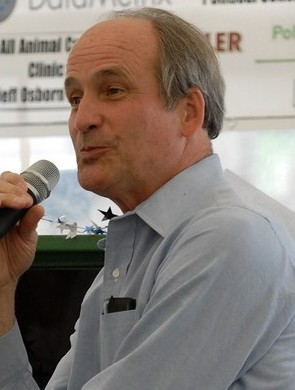
Nominee	Gordon Smith	Bill Bradbury
Party	Republican	Democratic
Popular vote	712,287	501,898
Percentage	56.21%	39.61%
- County results Smith: 40–50% 50–60% 60–70% 70–80% 80–90% Bradbury: 50–60%
Senator before election
Gordon Smith
Republican
Elected Senator
Gordon Smith
Republican

The 2002 United States Senate election in Oregon was held on November 5, 2002. Incumbent Republican United States Senator Gordon Smith ran for re-election to a second term. Oregon Secretary of State Bill Bradbury emerged as the Democratic nominee, and though a competitive gubernatorial election occurred at the same time, Bradbury's campaign was never able to gain traction and Smith overwhelmingly won re-election (Bradbury only carried Multnomah County). As of 2026, this is the last time the Republicans have won a U.S. Senate election in Oregon or any mainland West Coast states.

Along with Maine and New Mexico, this was one of the three Republican-held Senate seats up for election in a state that Al Gore won in the 2000 presidential election.

== Democratic primary ==
=== Candidates ===
- Bill Bradbury, Oregon Secretary of State
- Craig Hanson
- Greg Haven

=== Results ===
Democratic primary results
Party	Candidate	Votes	%
Democratic	Bill Bradbury	279,792	85.89%
Democratic	Craig Hanson	27,472	8.43%
Democratic	Greg Haven	13,995	4.30%
Democratic	Write-ins	4,480	1.38%
Total votes		325,739	100.00%

== Republican primary ==
- Gordon Smith, incumbent United States Senator

=== Results ===
Republican primary results
Party	Candidate	Votes	%
Republican	Gordon Smith (Incumbent)	306,504	98.89%
Republican	Write-ins	3,439	1.11%
Total votes		309,943	100.00%

== General election ==
=== Campaign ===
Smith, who had only served one term in the U.S. Senate, had slightly lower than a 50% approval rating before the summer of 2002 began. By July 2002, Smith had raised over $5 million, while Bradbury raised only about $1 million.

=== Predictions ===
Source	Ranking	As of
Sabato's Crystal Ball	Likely R	November 4, 2002

=== Results ===
United States Senate election in Oregon, 2002
Party	Candidate	Votes	%	±%
Republican	Gordon H. Smith (Incumbent)	712,287	56.21%	+6.41%
Democratic	Bill Bradbury	501,898	39.61%	−6.30%
Libertarian	Dan Fitzgerald	29,979	2.37%	+1.43%
Constitution	Lon Mabon	21,703	1.71%	
Write-ins		1,354	0.11%	
Majority		210,389	16.60%	+12.71%
Turnout		1,267,221		
Republican hold		Swing		

==== Counties that flipped from Democratic to Republican ====
- Clatsop (largest city: Astoria)
- Lane (largest city: Eugene)
- Lincoln (largest city: Newport)
- Benton (largest city: Corvallis)

== See also ==
- 2002 United States Senate elections
