= 1992 United States Senate election in Oregon =

- November 3, 1992
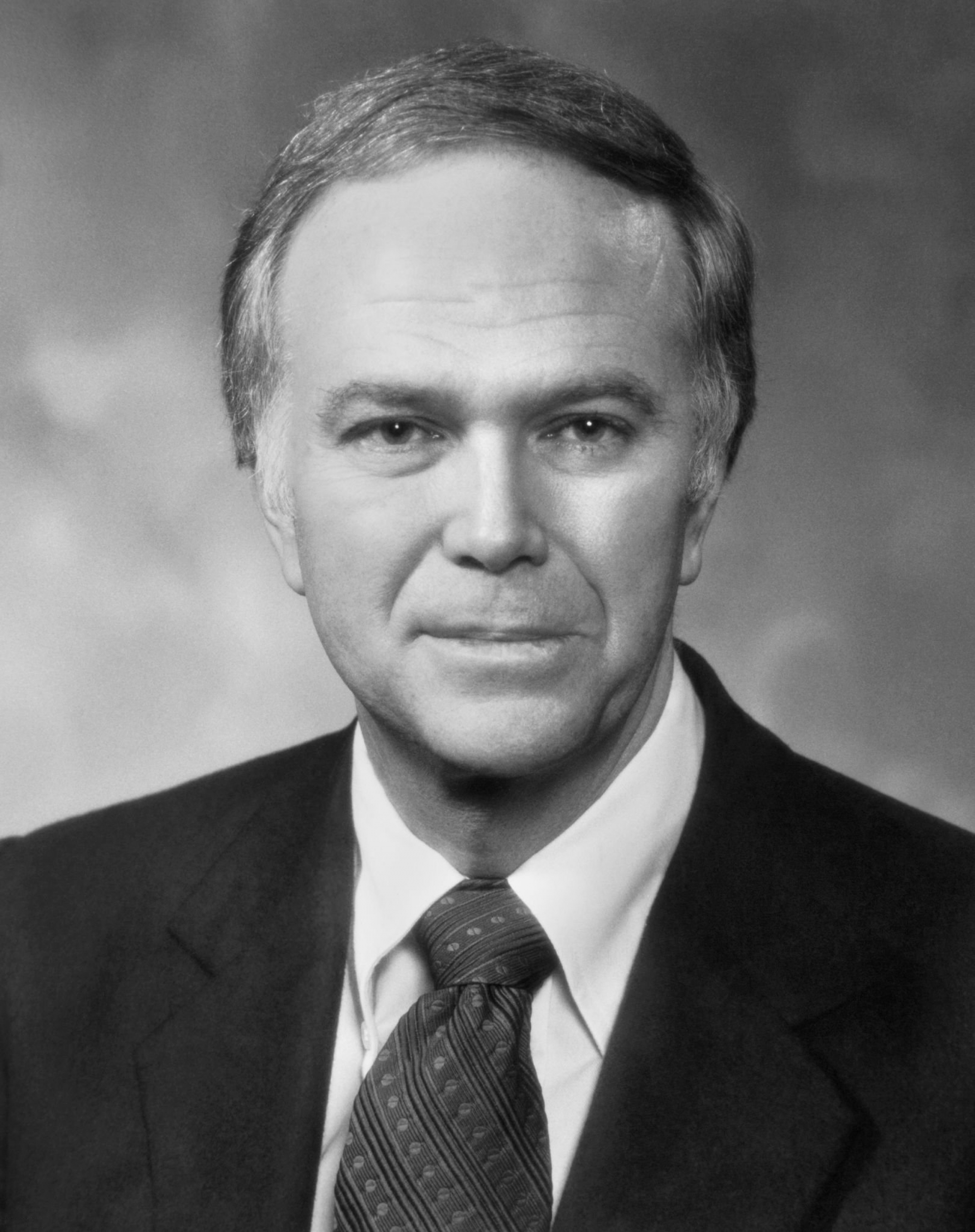

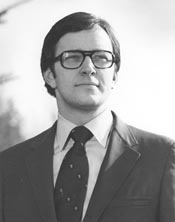
Nominee	Bob Packwood	Les AuCoin
Party	Republican	Democratic
Popular vote	717,455	639,851
Percentage	52.14%	46.50%
- County results Packwood: 50–60% 60–70% 70–80% AuCoin: 40–50% 50–60%
U.S. senator before election
Bob Packwood
Republican
Elected U.S. Senator
Bob Packwood
Republican

The 1992 United States Senate election in Oregon was held on November 3, 1992. Incumbent Republican U.S. Senator Bob Packwood won re-election to his fifth term. As of 2026, this is the last time the Republicans won the Class 3 U.S. Senate seat in Oregon.

== Background ==
As the election season got underway, analysts from both major parties predicted that Packwood would have one of the toughest seats to defend in what was anticipated to be a volatile election year. Packwood was regarded as one of the nation's "most powerful elected officials" with "extraordinary political instincts". But the state's largest newspaper, The Oregonian, had described AuCoin (Packwood's presumed main challenger) as having "persistence, imagination and clout [that] have made him the most powerful congressman in Oregon and one of the most influential members from the Northwest."

== Democratic primary ==
=== Campaign ===
For AuCoin, however, first came the Democratic primary. He faced Portland attorney Joe Wetzel and Bend businessman Harry Lonsdale in what became a "brutal, bitter" contest. Lonsdale, who had run a close race against incumbent Mark Hatfield for Oregon's other Senate seat in 1990, emerged as AuCoin's principal rival; Wetzel, who criticized Packwood and AuCoin as long-term, ineffective members of Congress, trailed throughout the race, and was not invited to an April debate sponsored by the City Club of Portland. Lonsdale took on "the Les AuCoin-Mark Hatfield-Bob Packwood coalition" as his primary cause, stating "I consider Les AuCoin a good man who has been corrupted by PAC money over the years".

In a race the Seattle Times called "as negative as many voters can remember", Lonsdale attacked AuCoin as "corrupt" and tied to the timber industry. Lonsdale's environmental credentials also came under scrutiny, and AuCoin noted Lonsdale's reversal of support for nuclear power and belated opposition to the re-opening of Trojan Nuclear Power Plant. AuCoin turned accusations of undue influence back on Lonsdale, pointing out that his company (Bend Research) had received millions in federal defense contracts.

Even during the primary, Packwood and AuCoin traded barbs on various issues. Packwood joined Lonsdale in criticizing AuCoin for his involvement in what was reported as a rash of check-bouncing among members of Congress; AuCoin characterized the issue as a series of mistakes, rather than gross abuses. In what was believed to be an unprecedented move, Packwood attempted to influence the Democratic primary's outcome by running television ads against AuCoin.

Ultimately, the results of the Democratic primary were so close that an automatic recount was triggered. AuCoin held a news conference on May 23 in the South Park Blocks stating he would wait for the recount, but the margin was currently 248 votes in his favor. On June 18, over a month after the primary election, AuCoin was certified as having won by 330 votes. Upon conceding the race, Lonsdale pondered mounting a write-in campaign, reiterating that Oregon needed an "outsider" in the Senate.

=== Results ===
Results by county AuCoin: 30–40%; 40–50%; 50–60%; Lonsdale: 30–40%; 40–50%; 50–60%

Democratic primary for the United States Senate from Oregon, 1992
Party	Candidate	Votes	%
Democratic	Les AuCoin	153,029	42.18%
Democratic	Harry Lonsdale	152,699	42.09%
Democratic	Joseph Wetzel	31,183	8.87%
Democratic	Bob Bell	23,700	6.53%
Democratic	Miscellaneous	1,194	0.33%
Total votes		361,805	100.00%

== Republican primary ==
=== Campaign ===
Packwood had gone through a divorce in 1991, and his ex-wife threatened to run against him amid mounting concerns about his "eye for the ladies". The socially conservative Oregon Citizens Alliance (OCA) was at the apex of its statewide prominence with 1992's anti-gay Measure 9 and its newly formed American Heritage Party (AHP). The group endorsed Republican challenger Joe Lutz, who had run against Packwood in the past on a family values platform; but Lutz soon withdrew, announcing a divorce of his own. As early as January, the OCA considered backing former gubernatorial candidate Al Mobley as an independent or as a member of the AHP. Mobley ultimately decided in mid-August not to run, stating that he could not bear the idea that he might be responsible for causing AuCoin to be elected. Packwood's most significant challenge thus came from little-known conservative Medford attorney John DeZell, who campaigned on the family values issue. Packwood cruised to victory over DeZell and several other candidates.

=== Results ===
Results by county Packwood: 50–60%; 60–70%; 70–80%

Republican primary for the United States Senate from Oregon, 1992
Party	Candidate	Votes	%
Republican	Bob Packwood (incumbent)	176,939	59.10%
Republican	John DeZell	61,128	20.42%
Republican	Stephanie J. Salvey	27,088	9.05%
Republican	Randy Prince	20,358	6.80%
Republican	Valentine Christian	10,501	3.51%
Republican	Miscellaneous	3,397	1.14%
Total votes		299,411	100.00%

== General election ==
=== Campaign ===
By the end of June, when the recount was complete, AuCoin was nearly out of campaign funds; Packwood entered the general election race with $3.2 million and was ranked sixth nationwide among Senators raising funds outside their home state during the 1990–1992 election season.

AuCoin opposed weakening the Endangered Species Act (ESA) to erase the Northern Spotted Owl's impact on the timber industry, but Packwood ("one of the timber industry's chief allies," according to Oregon State University political scientist William Lunch) assailed "environmental extremists" and introduced legislation to convene a presidential cabinet committee to exempt the endangered owl from the ESA.

In September, Packwood pulled ads that had falsely criticized AuCoin for missing votes while speaking to special interest groups. By October, Packwood had raised $8 million, spending $5.4 million more than AuCoin, and leading all Senate incumbents. Yet that fall, the two candidates were in a dead heat, with Packwood continuing to criticize AuCoin on attendance, his House bank account and the spotted owl, and AuCoin echoing the campaign of popular Presidential candidate Bill Clinton by accusing Packwood of favoring the wealthy over the middle class.

The outcome of the bruising race was too close to call on election night, but on the following day, Packwood emerged as the winner with about 52% of the vote to AuCoin's 47. In his victory press conference, Packwood endorsed AuCoin for Secretary of the Interior in the Clinton administration. When told of Packwood's comments, AuCoin responded by saying "I think that's real special."

=== Results ===
General election results
Party	Candidate	Votes	%
Republican	Bob Packwood (incumbent)	717,455	52.14%
Democratic	Les AuCoin	639,851	46.50%
Write-In	Miscellaneous	12,934	0.94%
Independent	Harry Lonsdale	5,793	0.42%
Total votes		1,376,033	100.00%
Republican hold			

== Aftermath ==
Magnifying the controversy of the race was a decision by The Washington Post to delay until after the election coverage of its year-long investigation into detailed claims of sexual abuse and assault made by 10 women against Packwood. The paper ultimately published the story two months after election day. Oregon's largest daily newspaper, The Oregonian, did not break the story either, despite its own investigation and its congressional correspondent being subjected to Packwood's advances. The paper's editor would later admit to having been less than aggressive in pursuing the story due to concerns about "...ruining a man's career."

A group of Oregon voters battled Packwood lawyers in briefs before the Senate Rules Committee in an unsuccessful attempt to persuade the panel to refuse to seat the senator on the grounds of election fraud for lying about the abuses. The senator admitted to the acts in 1994 and resigned after the Senate Ethics Committee censured him for his conduct in 1995.

AuCoin was considered for Secretary of the Interior and Secretary of the Army in the new Clinton administration, though he was not offered either post. When news of Packwood's resignation broke, AuCoin stated that he would not come out of retirement to run for the seat. He also stated that he would not engage in professional lobbying, but was criticized the next year for becoming the chairman of the government relations practice group in the law firm Bogle & Gates.

== See also ==
- 1992 United States Senate elections
