= 1996 United States Senate special election in Oregon =

- January 30, 1996
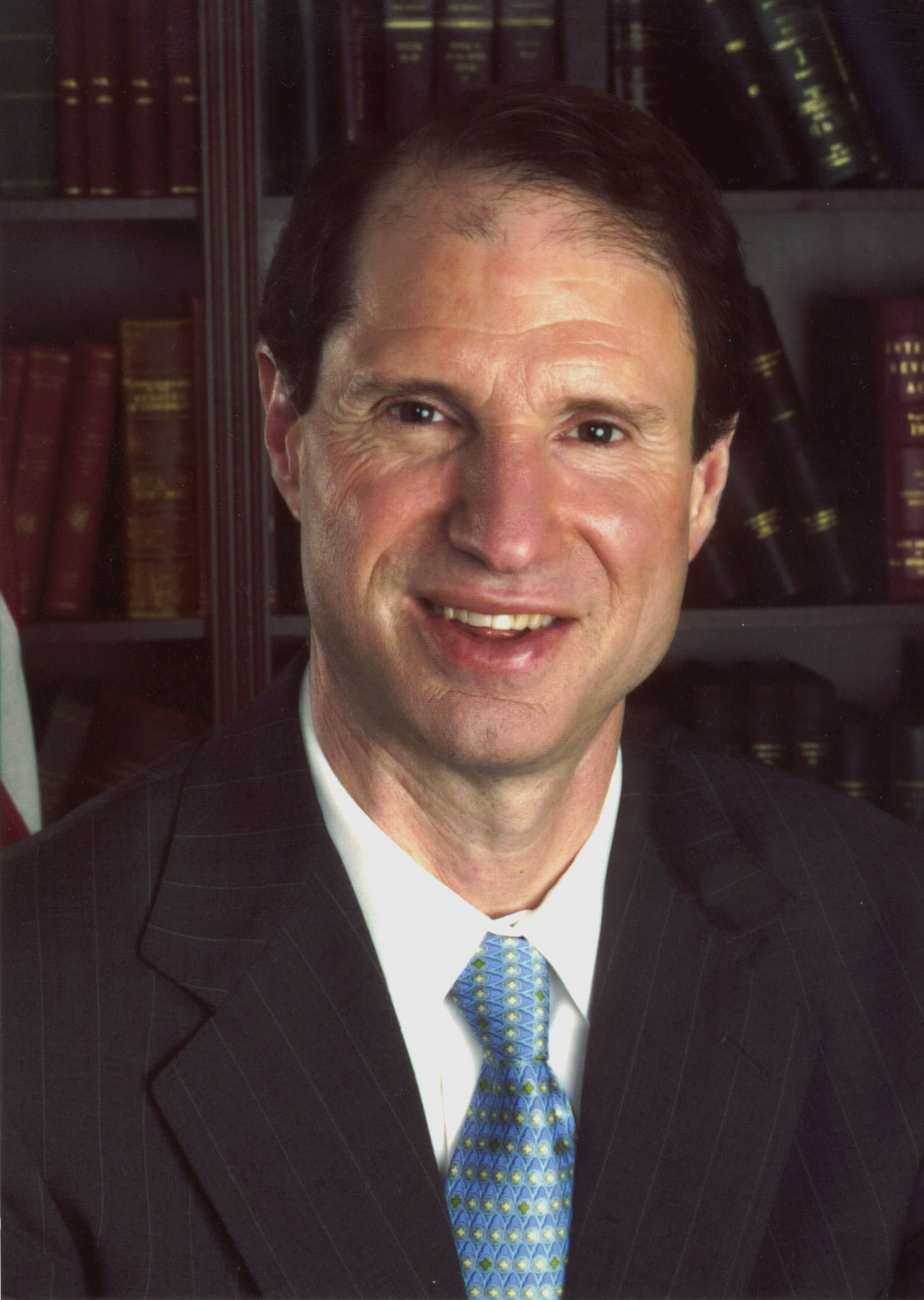

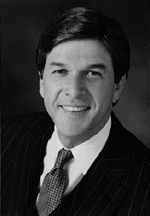
Nominee	Ron Wyden	Gordon Smith
Party	Democratic	Republican
Popular vote	571,739	553,519
Percentage	47.78%	46.26%
- County results Wyden: 40–50% 50–60% 60–70% Smith: 40–50% 50–60% 60–70% 70–80%
U.S. senator before election
Vacant
Elected U.S. Senator
Ron Wyden
Democratic

The 1996 United States Senate special election in Oregon was held on January 30, 1996, to fill the seat vacated by Republican Bob Packwood, who had resigned from the Senate due to sexual misconduct allegations. Governor at the time John Kitzhaber was not permitted by state law to appoint anyone to temporarily fill in for the rest of Packwood's term and called for a special election on January 30, 1996.

In the primaries held on December 5, 1995, Democratic U.S. Representative Ron Wyden and Republican Oregon State Senate President Gordon H. Smith were nominated. Wyden then defeated Smith in the general election. Smith won the regularly-scheduled election to Oregon’s other Senate seat later that year and served alongside Wyden until 2009. Wyden's victory made him the first Democratic senator from Oregon since 1969, when Wayne Morse left office after narrowly losing re-election to Packwood.

== Democratic primary ==
=== Candidates ===
- Peter DeFazio, U.S. representative
- Michael Donnelly, businessman and president of Wild Oregon Water
- Anna Nevenic, nurse and perennial candidate
- J.J.T. Van Dooremolen
- Ron Wyden, U.S. representative

=== Results ===
Results by county Wyden: 30–40%; 40–50%; 50–60%; 60–70%; DeFazio: 40–50%; 50–60%; 60–70%; 70–80%; 80–90%

Democratic primary results
Party	Candidate	Votes	%
Democratic	Ron Wyden	212,532	49.46%
Democratic	Peter DeFazio	187,411	43.61%
Democratic	Anna Nevenic	11,201	2.61%
Democratic	Michael Donnelly	8,340	1.94%
Democratic	Write-in Candidates	7,959	1.85%
Democratic	J.J.T. Van Dooremolen	2,279	0.53%
Plurality		25,121	5.85%
Total votes		429,722	100.00%

== Republican primary ==
=== Candidates ===
- Sam Berry, attorney
- Brian Boquist, businessman and rancher
- Jeffrey Brady, dentist
- Valentine Christian, candidate for the U.S. Senate in 1992
- Robert J. Fenton
- Lex Loeb
- Norma Paulus, Oregon Superintendent of Public Instruction, former Oregon Secretary of State, and nominee for governor of Oregon in 1986
- Jack Roberts, commissioner of the Oregon Bureau of Labor and Industries
- Gordon H. Smith, president of the Oregon State Senate
- John Thomas, policeman
- Tony G. Zangaro

=== Results ===
Results by county Smith: 50–60%; 60–70%; 70–80%; 80–90%

Republican primary results
Party	Candidate	Votes	%
Republican	Gordon H. Smith	246,060	63.63
Republican	Norma Paulus	98,158	25.38
Republican	Jack Roberts	29,687	7.68
Republican	John Thomas	3,272	0.85
Republican	Brian Boquist	3,228	0.84
Republican	Tony G. Zangaro	1,638	0.42
Republican	Sam Berry	1,426	0.37
Republican	Jeffrey Brady	1,160	0.3
Republican	Valentine Christian	943	0.24
Republican	Robert J. Fenton	632	0.16
Republican	Lex Loeb	508	0.13
Majority		147,902	38.25%
Total votes		386,712	100

== General election ==
=== Results ===
General election results
Party	Candidate	Votes	%
Democratic	Ron Wyden	571,739	47.78%
Republican	Gordon H. Smith	553,519	46.26%
American Independent	Karen Shilling	25,597	2.14%
Libertarian	Gene Nanni	15,698	1.31%
Independent	Write-In Candidates	14,958	1.25%
Socialist	Vickie Valdez	7,872	0.66%
Pacific Green	Lou Gold	7,225	0.60%
Plurality		18,220	1.52%
Total votes		1,196,608	100.0%
Democratic gain from Republican			

== See also ==
- 1996 United States Senate elections
