= 2006 Oregon Ballot Measures 46 and 47 =

Referendums strengthening campaign finance laws

Oregon ballot measures 46 and 47 were two ballot measures presented as a single package to voters; 46 would have amended the Constitution to allow limitations on campaign financing (heavily favoring popular vote, and requiring a 75% vote for such changes in the Legislature); and 47 detailed specific limitations. While Measure 47 passed, 46 did not, and the Secretary of State and Attorney General now refuse to enforce Measure 47 despite not having made constitutional challenges in court during cases filed against them to compel enforcement.

== Measure 46 ==
Measure 46
- Amends Constitution: Allows laws regulating election contributions, expenditures adopted by initiative or 3/4 of both legislative Houses.

Results
Choice	Votes	%
Yes	520,342	40.32%
No	770,251	59.68%
Valid votes	1,290,593	92.21%
Invalid or blank votes	109,057	7.79%
Total votes	1,399,650	100.00%
Registered voters/turnout		65.29%
- Results by county

Oregon Ballot Measure 46 would have amended the Oregon Constitution to allow laws to be passed or amended that would prohibit or limit contributions and expenditures of any kind to influence the outcome of any election. Under the measure, laws could be passed that prohibit or limit how much an individual or entity can give to a candidate for state or local (but not federal) office or other political campaign and how much an individual, entity, candidate or other political campaign can spend to influence the outcome of any state or local election.

At present the free speech guarantee in the state Constitution, Article 1, section 8, does not allow laws that prohibit or impose involuntary limits on political campaign contributions or expenditures in elections for state or local public office. Under this measure, the Oregon legislature or voters by initiative would have had the authority to restrict or limit political campaign contributions and expenditures, subject to federal law.

If it had passed, the measure would have required a three-fourths (3/4) vote of both the Oregon Senate and the Oregon House of Representatives to amend previously enacted laws, or pass new laws, prohibiting or limiting political campaign contributions or expenditures. Ordinarily, a simple majority vote of both the Oregon Senate and Oregon House is required to amend existing laws or pass new laws. Under the measure, voters by a simple majority could have adopted new laws or amend existing laws prohibiting or limiting political campaign contributions or expenditures.

The measure would not have applied to elections for federal offices, which are President of the United States, United States Senator, and United States Representative. Federal law does not currently allow states to prohibit or limit contributions or expenditures for or against ballot measures. The measure would not affect the free speech guarantee under the First Amendment of the United States Constitution.

=== Arguments in favor ===
Supporters of the measure argued that corporate money and moneyed interests had a corrupting and undue influence on elected officials and the legislative process. Supporters argued that measures 46 and 47 were campaign finance reform that would drive out mostly out-of-state contributions that they felt had corrupted the political system. Among the supporters was FairElections Oregon, a coalition of Oregon groups and people working on campaign finance reform. The coalition included:

- Sierra Club of Oregon
- OSPIRG (Oregon State Public Interest Research Group)
- Alliance for Democracy
- Physicians for Social Responsibility
- Pacific Green Party
- Democratic Party of Clackamas County
- Oregon Gray Panthers
- Northwest Progressive Community
- Health Care for All Oregon
- Universal Health Care for Oregon
- First Unitarian Church, Economic Justice Action Group

=== Arguments in opposition ===
Numerous groups organized in opposition to the measure, even while many supported the overall goal of campaign finance reform. The main arguments against measures 46 and 47 were that measures went too far in amending Oregon's Constitution and would undermine free speech protections. In addition, it was argued that while well-intentioned, it was too unclear what the long-term effects of the measure would be on the electoral system in Oregon. Groups which came out in opposition to the measure were:

- Oregon AFSCME
- ACLU of Oregon
- American Federation of Teachers-Oregon
- Basic Rights Oregon
- Ecumenical Ministries of Oregon
- Eugene Springfield Solidarity Network
- NARAL Pro-Choice Oregon
- Oregon Action
- Oregon AFL-CIO
- Oregon Education Association
- Oregon School Employees Association
- Our Oregon
- Planned Parenthood Advocates of Oregon
- SEIU/OPEU Locals 49 and 503
- Stand for Children

=== Election results ===
Measure 46 was rejected but Measure 47 passed by 53-47 percent. The Oregon Secretary of State and Attorney General refused to enforce Measure 47. The chief petitioners on Measure 47 and others sued the Oregon Secretary of State and Attorney General to compel them to implement and enforce Measure 47. The Oregon Supreme Court ruled the provisions of the measure, "properly read, requires Measure 47 to be codified and held in abeyance pending an appropriate constitutional amendment or judicial decision that will render it operative."

== Measure 47 ==
Measure 47
- Revises campaign finance laws: Limits or prohibits contributions and expenditures; adds disclosure, new reporting requirements.

Results
Choice	Votes	%
Yes	694,918	53.04%
No	615,256	46.96%
Valid votes	1,310,174	93.61%
Invalid or blank votes	89,476	6.39%
Total votes	1,399,650	100.00%
Registered voters/turnout		66.28%
County results
For
60–70%
50–60%
Against
50–60%

Oregon Ballot Measure 47 would have limited or prohibited certain political campaign contributions and expenditures. The measure would have applied to all elections for state and local offices but not to ballot measures or candidates for federal offices.

Current law requires reporting of certain contributions and expenditures, but does not limit contributors, contributions to, or expenditures for public office candidates. Measure limits individual contributions to candidates, political committees, "small donor committees," political parties, with annual cap for all contributions; limits political committee, political party contributions to candidates and each other; allows unlimited contributions by "small donor committees" (accepting only individual contributions not exceeding $50 annually). Prohibits corporate, union, organizational contributions and expenditures except through political committees funded solely by individuals. Prohibits candidate loans. Limits: candidate's spending to own candidacy; "independent expenditures" (defined) by individuals, political entities, organizations. Establishes: new disclosure, reporting requirements; procedure for increasing measure's limits to comply with state and federal constitutions. Unspent candidate funds revert to state. Other provisions.

=== Specific provisions of the measure ===
Under this measure:

- Corporations and labor unions may not contribute to candidates, political committees or political parties.
- Limits on contributions to candidates apply separately to primary and general elections. An individual may not contribute more than $500 per election regarding candidates for any particular statewide office or more than $100 per election regarding candidates for any non-statewide office.
- Per year, an individual may not contribute more than $50 to any single small donor committee, more than $500 to any other single political committee, more than $2,000 in aggregate to a political party, or more than $2,500 in aggregate contributions.
- A political committee may not contribute more than $2,000 per election regarding candidates for any particular statewide office or more than $400 per election regarding candidates for any non-statewide office. During a calendar year, a political committee may not contribute an aggregate amount exceeding $2,000 to a political party.
- A small donor committee accepting only contributions of $50 or less per individual per year may contribute any amount to candidates, political committees and political parties.
- A political party finance committee may not contribute more than $50,000 per election regarding candidates for any particular statewide office or more than $10,000 per election regarding candidates for any particular non-statewide office. A political party may have unlimited finance committees.
- A candidate may not contribute to the candidate's own campaign more than $50,000 per election for statewide office or $10,000 per election for other office. The candidate may contribute 50% more if the candidate is not the incumbent. A candidate who contributes more than $5,000 to the candidate's own campaign must report all subsequent candidate contributions within three business days and disclose in every paid communication the amount the candidate contributed.
- A candidate may not make loans to the candidate's own campaign.
- A corporation, labor union or other entity may not make independent expenditures supporting or opposing a candidate or political party.
- An individual may not make independent expenditures exceeding $10,000 per calendar year.
- Advertisements funded by independent expenditures must disclose the names and businesses of persons who contributed $1000 or more toward the expenditure.
- Persons whose independent expenditures exceed $200 per year must report the expenditures.
- A corporation or labor union may establish a political committee consisting only of contributions from individuals.
- An individual whose contributions exceed $500 per year must obtain a unique identifier from the Secretary of State and list it with subsequent contributions. The Secretary of State must report these individuals' campaign contributions on the Internet, which committees and candidates must monitor to avoid penalties.
- Some unobligated funds of candidate committees may forfeit to the State of Oregon, after each election cycle.
- Courts are directed to modify limits if necessary to comply with federal or state Constitutions.
- Civil fines and citizen actions to enforce the measure are provided.

=== Election results ===
Measure 46 was rejected but Measure 47 passed by 53-47 percent. The Oregon Secretary of State and Attorney General have refused to enforce Measure 47, event though no court has found any of it to be unconstitutional. The chief petitioners on Measure 47 and others have sued the Oregon Secretary of State and Attorney General to compel them to implement and enforce Measure 47. The case is currently before the Oregon Supreme Court awaiting judgement as oral arguments are now completed.

== See also ==
- List of Oregon ballot measures
