= Hoedads Reforestation Cooperative =

Forestry labor cooperative in Oregon, US

- Type: Worker-owned
- Industry: Reforestation
- Founded: Eugene, Oregon 1971
- Founder: Jerry Rust, John Sundquist
- Defunct: 1994
- Fate: Dissolved
- Number of locations: Western United States
- Website: www.hoedadsonline.com

The Hoedads Reforestation Cooperative (formally, Hoedads Cooperative Inc.) was a worker-owned tree planting and forestry labor cooperative based in Eugene, Oregon, United States. It was active throughout the American West from 1971 to 1994. For several years they were country's largest worker-owned cooperative. They were noted for their success in applying the cooperative model successfully to treeplanting. They were also known for their experimentation with and early embrace of concepts such as environmentalism, feminism and alternative economics.

The Hoedads took their name from their use of the "hoedad" (or "hoedag"), a hand implement similar to a hoe used to plant bare-root trees on steep slopes (Hartzell 1987: 29, 45-46).

== Origins ==
The Hoedads were started by Jerry Rust (later a Lane County Commissioner) and John Sundquist. Rust had returned from a Peace Corps stint in India in the late 1960s and found work planting trees. Both Rust and Sundquist had a love of tree planting but realized that the economics of the industry favored those who organized work crews to bid on jobs with the government or forest owners, rather than merely laboring. They organized their first work unit in 1971, and successfully bid on reforestation projects, beginning with a subcontract in the Tiller District of the Umpqua National Forest (Hartzell 1987). The eventual success of the early Hoedads crew was such that by the late summer of 1973, the group was ready to expand. A meeting was called near Eugene, Oregon which attracted nearly 200 interested workers. Gary Ruvkun, writing in the Coevolution Quarterly 1976 and in the Next Whole Earth Catalog 1980, explained how the coop expanded:

A woodsy type character with a full beard, and huge build, and powerful voice called us all around him to chat ... He and his friends standing next to him had planted trees as a cooperative crew for a few years already and had really enjoyed working together, unlike commercial tree planting operations with a crew boss and hourly wage workers. They went on to explain the advantages of a cooperative tree planting for making money as well as for our souls. But these boys didn't just want to enjoy their crew, being true new age entrepreneurs, they did not want to give the assembled crowd any work. They offered to get contracts for us, all of us, if we could organize ourselves into cohesive cooperative crews like their crew ... They then went on to explain how to organize a crew, the necessity of some money, a crew crummy (the rig in which you ride to work), a treasurer, a crew ideology or by-laws, etc. A lot of information was passed on how they intended for us to work together.

== Economics ==
The early success of the Hoedads mirrored a unique situation in both American society and in the forestry industry. Generations of clear cutting in the American West had left a huge unmet need for replanting. The U.S. Forest Service, and large landowners, solicited bids to replant trees on a contract basis. Thus work was readily available. The main barrier to entry was to organize a crew, and in many cases, to have land or assets available to pledge as collateral when bidding on a contract. Tree planting itself is hard work, however is not hard to learn and thus motivated crews could quickly be trained and put to work.

The hippie and back to the land movements of the era influenced the Hoedads heavily. There existed large numbers of able bodied young people interested in working the land in a cooperative fashion. Tree planting also lends itself to work in an egalitarian manner; the work is not complex and all planters on a crew can perform the same task.

Many Hoedads had educational backgrounds far beyond what is typical in the logging industry. For example, co-founder Jerry Rust mentioned his surprise upon realizing everyone in his crew had a college degree, and it was not uncommon for crews to have members with post-graduate degrees. Thus many crew members had aspirations beyond merely laboring and actively participated in building the cooperative structure of the Hoedads. However, this also led to a high turnover, as some members grew tired of the repetitive and backbreaking aspects of tree planting work and moved on to other endeavors after a year or two.

== Cooperative structure ==
The Hoedads' embrace of direct worker democracy led to some long debates and experiments in pay structure. One of the earliest debates was in how members should be paid — by the tree, as was common in the forest industry, or by the hour. Each work crew functioned independently and could set its own policy. Some crews paid by the tree, some by the hour, and some by some combination thereof. Other crews chose "equal pay for equal effort," paying each planter an equal share of the revenue earned by the crew on any particular day.

== Environmentalism and feminism ==
The Hoedads are credited as being the first group to challenge the notion of forestry work as an all-male domain and most Hoedads work crews included women. Some work crews even were all female.

== End of the cooperative ==
The Hoedads Reforestation Cooperative ended in 1994 or 1995. By the 1990s, growing environmental consciousness led to reduced clearcutting. Fewer contracts for forest replanting were available. Additionally, the co-op faced multiple lawsuits from a group called the Associated Reforestation Contractors (ARC), created specifically to challenge the worker-owned business model.

Hoedad-style cooperative reforestation became less appealing to timber companies and related businesses, which chose instead to recruit migrant workers, many from Latin America. Undocumented workers and temporary migrants on H-2B visas were willing to work for low wages on commercial tree planting crews.
