= Bill Bradbury =

American politician (1949–2023)

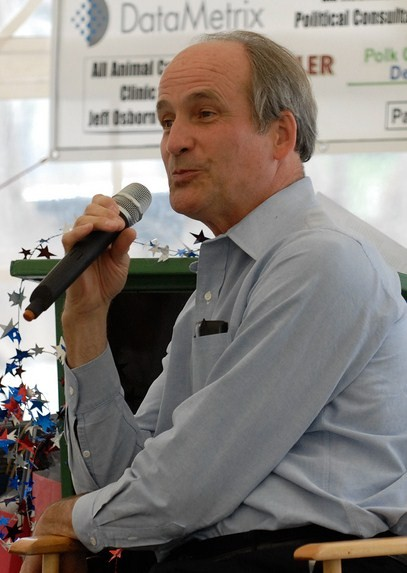
- Bradbury in 2009

23rd Secretary of State of Oregon
- In office November 8, 1999 – January 5, 2009
- Governor: John Kitzhaber; Ted Kulongoski
- Preceded by: Phil Keisling
- Succeeded by: Kate Brown

51st President of the Oregon State Senate
- In office 1993–1994
- Preceded by: John Kitzhaber
- Succeeded by: Gordon Smith

Member of the Oregon State Senate
- In office 1985–1995

Member of the Oregon House of Representatives
- In office 1981–1985

Personal details
- Born: May 29, 1949 Chicago, Illinois, U.S.
- Died: April 14, 2023 (aged 73)
- Party: Democratic
- Spouse: Katy Eymann
- Relations: Richard O. Eymann (father in-law)
- Children: 2
- Education: Antioch College (BA)

Bill Bradbury (May 29, 1949 – April 14, 2023) was an American politician who served as a member of the Oregon Legislative Assembly and as the 23rd Oregon secretary of state from 1999 to 2009. Bradbury was an unsuccessful candidate for the 2010 Oregon gubernatorial election. In 2010, he was appointed to the Northwest Power and Conservation Council by Oregon Governor Ted Kulongoski.

== Early life and education ==
Bradbury was born in Chicago, Illinois, in 1949, the third child of William and Lorraine Bradbury. He grew up in Chicago, where his father was an associate professor of sociology at the University of Chicago. In September 1958, Bill's mother and father were killed in an automobile accident in Montana. Bill and his sister Kathy were injured, but survived, and moved to Swarthmore, Pennsylvania, to be raised by their aunt and uncle.

Bradbury graduated from the University of Chicago Laboratory High School in 1967. He attended Antioch College in Yellow Springs, Ohio where he studied communications, and moved to Oregon in 1969 where he worked as a news reporter, director, and producer in Bandon, Eugene, and Portland.

== Career ==
=== State representative (1981–1995) ===
Bradbury was elected to the Oregon House of Representatives from Curry and southern Coos County in 1980. He was elected to the Oregon State Senate in 1984, where he was elected by his colleagues to serve in the leadership posts of Senate majority leader in 1986, and senate president in 1993. During Bradbury's time as president of the Senate, Jeff Golden, now Senator from District 3, served as his chief of staff.

As a legislator, Bill focused on environmental protection and economic development. He worked to pass legislation to establish Small Business Development Centers at community colleges around the state, to develop the Salmon and Trout Enhancement Program (STEP), to develop a relief plan to assist displaced timber workers, and prevent offshore oil drilling off the Oregon Coast.

Bradbury left the Oregon Legislature in 1995 and founded and became the executive director of For the Sake of the Salmon, a regional non-profit organization which sought to restore salmon stocks and watershed restoration. MSNBC called Bradbury an "environmental activist".

=== Secretary of state (1999–2009) ===
Following the resignation of Phil Keisling, Governor John Kitzhaber appointed Bradbury to be Oregon Secretary of State in November 1999. He was elected to the office in 2000, and re-elected in 2004, serving for nine years. As the state's second-highest-ranking constitutional officer, he was auditor of public accounts, chief elections officer, and manager of the state's official legislative and executive records. He also chaired the Oregon State Land Board, which oversees management of state-owned lands, and was appointed by the Governor to chair the Oregon Sustainability Board. As Secretary of State, Bradbury was a Superdelegate for Barack Obama at the 2008 Democratic National Convention.

Following the passage of Measure 60 in 1998, Oregon moved to conduct all its elections by mail. As Secretary of State, Bradbury implemented the system, the first of its kind in the nation, which has increased voter participation in Oregon and decreased vote fraud. He also increased the transparency of financial transactions in our elections by having the Secretary of State's website host ORESTAR, an electronic reporting system for campaign contributions and spending. Bradbury also took the lead in coordinating state agencies to create an online business registry in Oregon to reduce paperwork and filing fees.

Bradbury was the Democratic challenger to incumbent Senator Gordon H. Smith in the 2002 United States Senate election in Oregon, but was defeated by over 18 points. He only carried one county in the state, Multnomah County, home to Portland.

After leaving office, Bradbury traveled the state, giving over 200 presentations on climate change and its effects on Oregon.

=== 2010 Oregon gubernatorial election ===
Bradbury was a candidate for the Democratic nomination for Governor of Oregon in 2010, but lost in the primary to former governor John Kitzhaber. Bradbury had been endorsed by former Democratic National Committee Chairman and Presidential candidate Howard Dean; former Oregon Governor Barbara Roberts; former Vice President Al Gore; the Oregon Education Association; the American Federation of Teachers-Oregon (AFT-OR); and the Oregon School Employees Association (OSEA).

== Personal life and death ==
Bradbury was diagnosed with multiple sclerosis in 1981.

Bradbury lived in Salem and Bandon, Oregon, with his wife Katy Eymann, whom he married in 1986. She is the daughter of Richard O. Eymann, who served as speaker of the Oregon House of Representatives in the 1970s. Bradbury had two daughters, Abby and Zoë, from a previous marriage.

Bradbury died while on an around-the-world cruise with his wife, on April 14, 2023. He was 73.

== Electoral history ==
- 2010 Democratic Primary Governor
  - John Kitzhaber, 242,545
  - Bill Bradbury, 110,298
  - Roger Obrist, 16,057
  - Misc., 5,504
- 2004 General Election Secretary of State
  - Bill Bradbury (D) (inc.), 1,000,052
  - Betsy Close (R), 690,228
  - Richard Morley (L), 56,678
  - Misc., 3,871
- 2004 Democratic Primary Secretary of State
  - Bill Bradbury, 311,602
  - Paul Damian Wells, 41,196
  - Misc., 1,839
- 2002 General Election United States Senate
  - Gordon Smith (R) (inc.), 712,287
  - Bill Bradbury (D), 501,898
  - Lon Mabon (C), 21,703
  - Dan Fitzgearld (L), 29,979
  - Misc., 1,354
- 2002 Democratic Primary United States Senate
  - Craig Hanson, 27,472
  - Greg Haven, 13,995
  - Bill Bradbury, 279,792
  - Misc., 4,480
- 2000 General Election Secretary of State
  - Bill Bradbury (D), 725,265
  - Lloyd Marbet (G), 64,555
  - Lynn Snodgrass (R), 652,803
  - Ed Pole (L), 24,286
  - Misc., 926
- 2000 Democratic Primary Secretary of State
  - Bill Bradbury, 290,870
  - Misc., 4,513

== See also ==
- Secretary of state (U.S. state government)

Party political offices
Preceded by Tom Bruggere	Democratic nominee for U.S. Senator from Oregon (Class 2); 2002	Succeeded by Jeff Merkley
Political offices
Preceded by Phil Keisling	Secretary of State of Oregon; 1999–2009	Succeeded by Kate Brown
