= Walter Huss =

American politician (1918–2006)

Chair of the Oregon Republican Party
- In office August 1978 – May 1979
- Preceded by: Steve Young
- Succeeded by: Robert Voy

Personal details
- Born: May 19, 1918 Portland, Oregon, U.S.
- Died: August 28, 2006 (aged 88) Portland, Oregon, U.S.
- Party: Republican
- Spouse: Rosalie Huss

Walter L. Huss (May 19, 1918 – August 28, 2006) was a fundamentalist minister, anti-communist activist, and newspaper publisher who served as chairman of the Oregon Republican Party between August 1978 and May 1979. Huss ran multiple times for statewide office in Oregon as a Republican, but never won a primary.

== Career ==
=== 1964 congressional campaign ===
Huss was a candidate for congress in 1964, running in the republican primary to represent Oregon's 3rd congressional district. He ultimately finished second behind Lyle Dean, with 21,087 votes to Dean's 27,325. Dean went on to lose the general election to incumbent congresswoman Edith Green.

=== 1966 senatorial campaign ===
In 1966 Huss ran in the Republican primary for Oregon's Class 2 senate seat. He finished second behind Mark Hatfield, who went on to win the general election. Hatfield was an opponent of the Vietnam War, which Huss supported.

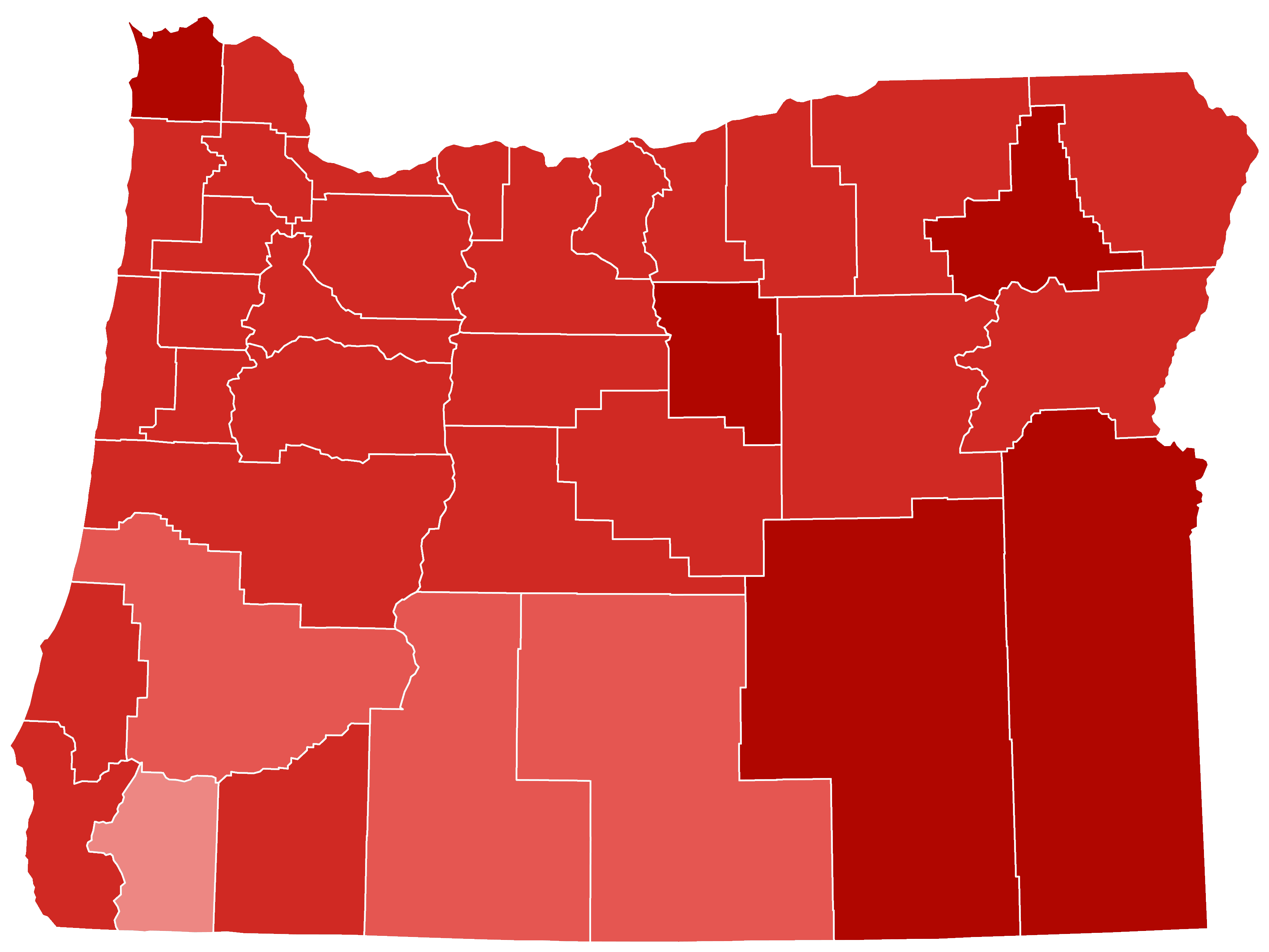
Results of the 1966 Republican Primary for US Senate Hatfield: 50–60% 60–70% 70–80% 80–90%

=== Chair of Oregon Republican Party ===
On August 5, 1978, at a GOP organizational meeting in Bend, Oregon, Huss defeated incumbent Oregon party chair Steve Young in a delegate vote by a margin of 51 to 44. His candidacy for chair was supported by conservative activists. Less than 8 months later (on March 16, 1978), Huss announced his intention to resign effective April 30th of that year, under pressure from fellow conservatives who felt he had been insufficiently focused on his job as chair. Huss ultimately stayed on as chair past April to finish overseeing a financial audit started under his leadership, leaving the job in May.

During Huss's tenure as chair, he repeatedly clashed with moderates in the party. At one point, moderate Republicans including secretary of state Norma Paulus and state treasurer Clay Myers organized a rival organization, the Council of Elected Republicans, to raise funds without going through the state party. Huss also came under fire for saying he preferred candidates who were Christians. Accused of antisemitism for these comments by the likes of Republican gubernatorial nominee Victor Atiyeh, Huss denied any ill intent, saying in part that "one of my best friends is a Jew — Jesus Christ."

=== 1980 senatorial campaign ===
Instead of running for office in 1980, Huss campaigned for his wife, Rosalie, who ran in the Republican primary against incumbent senator Bob Packwood. Packwood won both the primary and the general.

=== 1982 gubernatorial campaign ===
In 1982 Huss ran against incumbent governor Victor Atiyeh in the Republican gubernatorial primary. Atiyeh won both the primary and the general elections.

== Extremist ties ==
Huss owned a rare Canadian antisemitic tract that had been sold and circulated at Silver Shirt, German American Bund, and American Defenders meetings in Portland in the late 1930s. In the 1980s, Huss was on the mailing lists for the Institute for Historical Review and David Duke's National Association for the Advancement of White People. For much of his life, he subscribed to Gerald L. K. Smith's antisemitic magazine The Cross and the Flag. In 1978, Gerald Ford asked colleagues in Oregon whether they'd managed to oust Huss from his position, referring to him as "that nut."

In the 1970s and 1980s, Huss received newsletters from militia-linked Christian Identity figures such as Jack Mohr and Sheldon Emry. In the mid-1990s, Huss attended survivalist training sessions run by Bo Gritz, where he listened to and recorded lectures by Eustace Mullins.
