= Tom Bruggere =

American politician

Thomas Bruggere
- Born: February 18, 1946 (age 80); Berkeley, California, U.S.
- Education: Bachelor of Arts in Mathematics, University of California, Santa Barbara (1968); Masters of Science in Computer Science, University of Wisconsin (1972); Masters of Business Administration, Pepperdine University (1975).
- Occupations: computer software and engineering
- Known for: founder of Mentor Graphics
- Political party: Democratic

Tom Bruggere (born February 18, 1946, in Berkeley, California) is an American entrepreneur and politician from Oregon. He founded the company Mentor Graphics and has been involved with several other startup companies. He was the Democratic party nominee for the 1996 United States Senate election in Oregon.

== Early life ==
Tom Bruggere was born in Berkeley, California. He stated of his early life that he "grew up with a picture of Jack and Bobby Kennedy over [his] bed."

He has a Bachelor of Arts in Mathematics from the University of California, Santa Barbara, a Masters of Science in Computer Science from the University of Wisconsin, and a Masters of Business Administration from Pepperdine University. He served in the Army in the Vietnam War, from 1968 to 1970. Prior to running for office, he served on several government boards, including the Oregon State Board of Higher Education.

Bruggere was an engineer with Burroughs Corporation Medium Systems Plant in Pasadena, California, in the early to mid-1970s, then with Tektronix, Inc. in the late 1970s.

He is Protestant.

== Leadership of Mentor Graphics ==
Bruggere founded Mentor Graphics, a Tektronix spinoff, in 1981. A 1991 article in Oregon Business magazine stated: "One of [Tektronix'] main contributions to Oregon has been the many companies that spun off from former employees," citing the success of Bruggere and a number of other creative former Tektronix employees with Mentor Graphics as the prime example. He was one of the people credited with founding the Oregon Center for Advanced Technology Education and served as chairman of the center in the early 2000s. Mentor Graphics is credited with having established the industry of electronic design automation. He resigned as president and CEO in October 1993, and was succeeded in both roles by Wally Rhines. Upon leaving Mentor Graphics, he cited a desire "to do something else, something in public policy."

== 1996 U.S. Senate race ==
Bruggere won the Democratic nomination for the United States Senate seat vacated by the retiring Mark Hatfield in 1996. Spending $800,000 of his own money in the primary race, he was one of 134 candidates for the U.S. Congress to finance their own elections in excess of $50,000 in that cycle.

Bruggere's Republican opponent, Gordon Smith, was also heavily self-financed, having spent $2.5 million of his own money earlier that same year in an unsuccessful effort to defeat Democrat Ron Wyden in the special election to replace Bob Packwood, who had resigned.

In the general election race, most Oregon daily newspapers endorsed Smith over Bruggere. Bruggere lost a close election to Smith, with neither side claiming victory for several days after the election, when absentee ballots were tallied.

== Further business ventures ==
Bruggere was the founding Chairman of Stamps.com and Sensoria. He resigned from the Stamps.com board in October 2000.

He has also served on the boards of Will Vinton Studios, OpenMarket, and Sirigen and on the advisory boards of Mercy Corps and of the Technology Management Program at UCSB.

As of 2011, he was part of the management team of 13therapeutics, a biotech spin-off of the Oregon Health & Science University (OHSU).

Party political offices
Preceded by Harry Lonsdale	Democratic nominee for U.S. Senator from Oregon (Class 2); 1996	Succeeded by Bill Bradbury
