= Harry Lonsdale =

American scientist, businessman, and politician

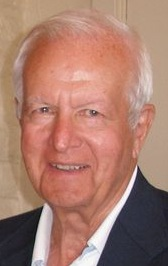
- Born: January 19, 1932; Westfield, New Jersey, U.S.
- Died: November 11, 2014 (aged 82); Indio, California, U.S.
- Education: Rutgers University
- Occupations: Businessman, scientist
- Political party: Democratic

Harold K. Lonsdale (January 19, 1932 – November 11, 2014) was an American scientist, businessman, and politician. A Democrat, he ran for United States Senate in the U.S. state of Oregon three times, losing twice in the primaries and once as the Democratic candidate, losing in the 1990 general election to incumbent Republican Mark Hatfield. In 2011 Lonsdale sponsored a research challenge to determine the origin of life on Earth.

== Early life ==
Lonsdale was born in Westfield, New Jersey, the son of a Sicilian immigrant mother and a Welsh father who had been orphaned at age 2. In 1953, he received a bachelor's degree in chemistry from Rutgers University and four years later received a Ph.D. in chemistry from Penn State University. Lonsdale joined the United States Air Force, where he once witnessed an above-ground nuclear test, an event which he found thrilling, but also one which left him with strong anti-war feelings.

== Business career ==
Following his Air Force stint, he moved to San Diego, California to work for defense contractor General Atomics on membrane research. After General Atomics, Lonsdale was a scientist at Alza Corporation in Palo Alto, California for several years. By the mid 1970s, Lonsdale and his wife had grown weary of congestion and the lack of open space in California's Silicon Valley; on one occasion, his family moved a planned outdoor picnic to their kitchen after no suitable outdoor location could be found. Soon afterward, Lonsdale quit Alza and the family moved to Bend, Oregon, where with his partner Richard Baker, he started Bend Research, Inc., a company focused on development of new technologies for industries such as the pharmaceutical industry. In 1989, Pfizer completed the purchase of a minority interest in the company, making Lonsdale a millionaire.

== Political career ==
In the mid-1980s, Lonsdale became active in many business, environmental, and civic concerns, including the Native Forest Council. He joined the board of the Oregon Museum of Science and Industry, headed a task force to have the planned Superconducting Super Collider built in Oregon, and was a co-chairman of Governor Neil Goldschmidt's science council.

=== 1990 Senate election ===
In 1990, Lonsdale announced that he would challenge incumbent Republican Senator Mark Hatfield for his seat in the U.S. Senate. Lonsdale's two main campaign themes were abortion rights (which Hatfield opposed) and timber management, in which Lonsdale opposed exporting timber from Oregon forests and wanted to restrict logging in old-growth forests. Lonsdale also refused to take special-interest contributions in his campaign, instead financing the campaign himself.

After winning the Democratic nomination, Lonsdale considered a longshot, began to close in on Hatfield as he attacked the Republican's record on abortion and the environment in numerous television ads. Hatfield, who had always relied on his stature as a statesman in campaigns, was forced to change his usual tactic of not engaging his opponent. Hatfield turned the environment issue against Lonsdale, accusing him of hypocrisy by presenting allegations that Lonsdale had allowed his company to dispose of toxic waste into the environment. The change of tactics stalled Lonsdale's momentum, and Hatfield would win the election handily, though this would be his last Senate campaign.

=== 1992 Senate election ===
In 1991, Lonsdale made plans for another Senate run at Oregon's other Senate seat, this one held by Bob Packwood. This time, he received a stronger challenge for the Democratic nomination, chiefly from U.S. Congressman Les AuCoin, who resigned his seat in Oregon's 1st congressional district to run for the Senate. Lonsdale went after AuCoin, whom he accused of having been corrupted by PAC money over the years. Lonsdale also criticized AuCoin's ties to the timber industry. AuCoin turned accusations of undue influence back on Lonsdale, pointing out that Bend Research had received millions in federal defense contracts, and noted Lonsdale's reversal of support for nuclear power and belated opposition to the re-opening of Trojan Nuclear Power Plant. Lonsdale received surprising support from Packwood, who believed AuCoin to be a stronger competitor, and ran television ads against AuCoin.

The results of the Democratic primary were so close that an automatic recount was triggered. On June 18, over a month after the primary election, AuCoin was certified as having won by 330 votes. Upon conceding the race, Lonsdale pondered mounting a write-in campaign, reiterating that Oregon needed an "outsider" in the Senate. Lonsdale would receive fewer than 6,000 write-in votes in the general election, in which Packwood won re-election.

=== 1996 Senate election ===
Following Hatfield's retirement from the Senate in 1996, Lonsdale ran again in the 1996 primary, but lost to Mentor Graphics founder Tom Bruggere by a wide margin.

=== Other campaigns ===
Lonsdale did not seek office again, though he sponsored several petitions related to campaign finance reform through the early 2000s. In 2006, one of his sponsored measures limiting campaign financing, Measure 47, passed, but did not go into effect because a companion measure (Measure 46) that would have amended the Oregon Constitution to allow limitations on campaign financing failed to pass.

== Scientific endeavors ==
In 2011, Lonsdale, an avowed atheist, announced a $50,000 award to the best proposal that offered "a cogent hypothesis for how life first arose, including its plausible chemistry, and for how primitive life could have evolved to modern biological cells, including the present genetic material and metabolism." The campaign received more than 70 and in June 2012 the prize was awarded to chemists John Sutherland and Matthew Powner.

== Personal ==
Lonsdale married his high-school sweetheart Connie shortly after graduating from Rutgers. The couple had two children and divorced in 1985. He was briefly married to Portland attorney Susan Hammer in 1986. He married Bryn Hazell in 1993. He retired from Bend Research in 1994 and moved to Southern California, where he died after suffering a heart attack in 2014.

Party political offices
Preceded by Margie Hendriksen	Democratic nominee for U.S. Senator from Oregon (Class 2); 1990	Succeeded by Tom Bruggere
