= Gordon H. Smith =

American politician (born 1952)

Gordon Smith
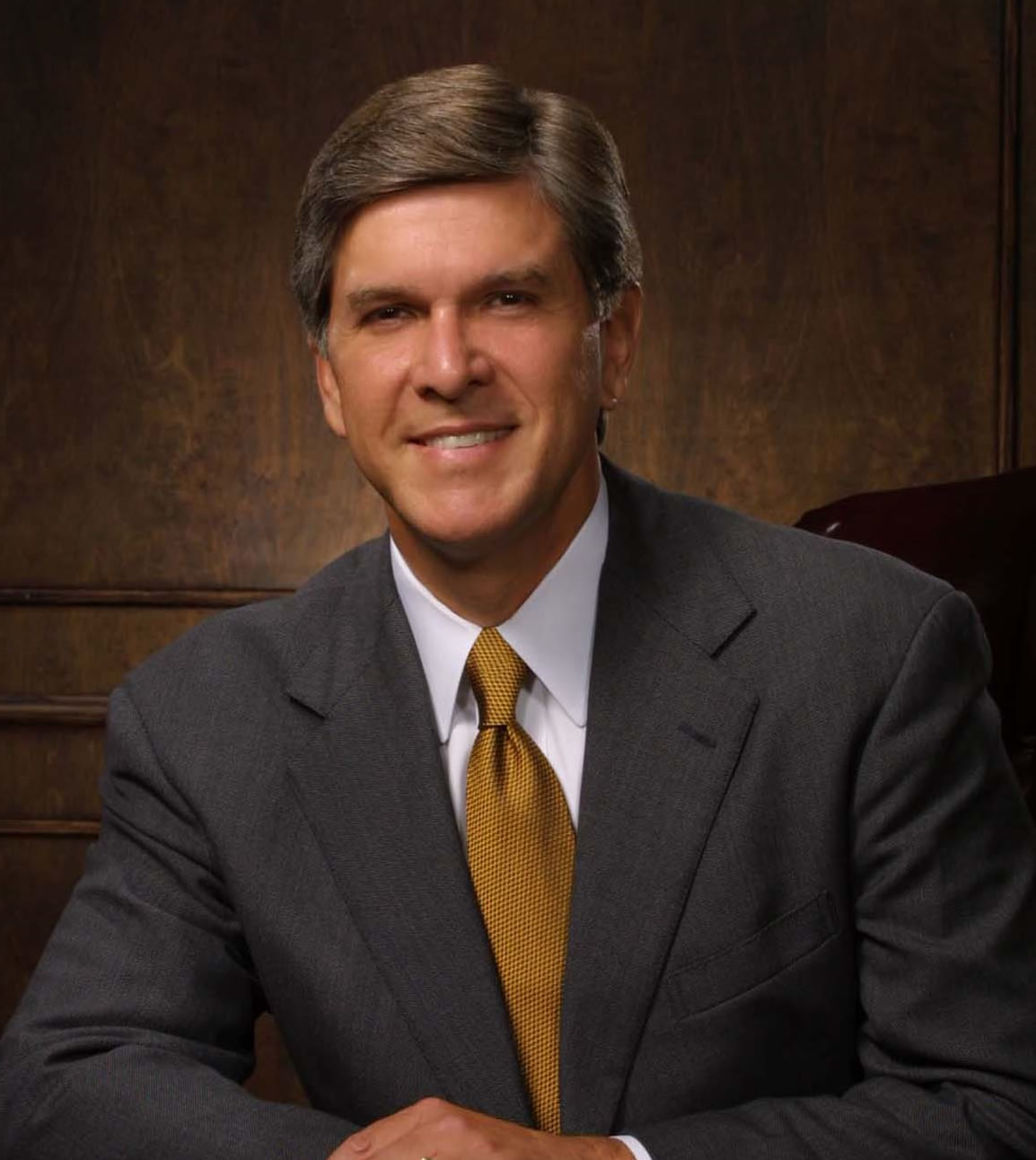

United States Senator from Oregon
- In office January 3, 1997 – January 3, 2009
- Preceded by: Mark Hatfield
- Succeeded by: Jeff Merkley

Chair of the Senate Aging Committee
- In office January 3, 2005 – January 3, 2007
- Preceded by: Larry Craig
- Succeeded by: Herb Kohl

President of the Oregon State Senate
- In office January 3, 1995 – January 3, 1997
- Preceded by: Bill Bradbury
- Succeeded by: Brady Adams

Member of the Oregon State Senate from the 29th district
- In office January 3, 1993 – January 3, 1997
- Preceded by: Scott Duff
- Succeeded by: David Nelson

Personal details
- Born: Gordon Harold Smith; May 25, 1952 (age 74) Pendleton, Oregon, U.S.
- Party: Republican
- Spouse: Sharon Smith
- Children: 3
- Relatives: Milan Smith (brother); Tom Udall (cousin); Mark Udall (cousin); See Udall family
- Education: Brigham Young University (BA); Southwestern Law School (JD)
- Smith's voice Smith on voting rights for African Americans. Recorded July 20, 2006

Gordon Harold Smith (born May 25, 1952) is an American politician, businessman, and religious leader who served as a United States senator from the state of Oregon. A Republican, he served two terms in the Senate from 1997 to 2009. From 2009 to 2022, he served as president of the National Association of Broadcasters (NAB). He served as an area seventy for the Church of Jesus Christ of Latter-day Saints (LDS Church) from 2012 to 2022, and since March 2025 has served as the church's director of hosting at Temple Square. As of 2026, he is the last Republican to represent Oregon in the U.S. Senate.

== Early life and family ==
Smith was born in Pendleton, Oregon, to Jessica (Udall) and Milan Dale Smith on May 25, 1952. Smith's family moved to Bethesda, Maryland during his childhood, when his father became an Assistant United States Secretary of Agriculture. He was involved with the Boy Scouts of America and earned the rank of Eagle Scout. After graduating from high school, he served for two years as an LDS Church missionary in New Zealand.

Smith then went to college at Brigham Young University, received a Juris Doctor degree from Southwestern University School of Law, and became an attorney in New Mexico and Arizona. He moved back to Oregon in the 1980s to become director of the family-owned Smith Frozen Foods company in Weston, Oregon.

In the 1980s, Smith and his wife, Sharon, adopted three children, two sons (Morgan and Garrett) and a daughter (Brittany). On September 8, 2003, Garrett, then a 21-year-old college student majoring in culinary arts, died by suicide. Smith wrote a book entitled Remembering Garrett, One Family’s Battle with a Child’s Depression. In 2004, President George W. Bush signed the Garrett Lee Smith Memorial Act, authorizing $82 million for suicide-prevention and awareness programs at colleges.

Smith is also a member of the Udall political family. His mother was a cousin of the late Representatives Mo Udall (D-AZ) and Stewart Udall (D-AZ), and Smith is a second cousin of Senators Mark Udall (D-CO) and Tom Udall (D-NM). He is a double second cousin of both of them, as their great-grandparents were a pair of brothers and a pair of sisters who married. All three of them were candidates for Senate in the 2008 elections. Smith was the only Republican and incumbent senator of the group, and the only one of the three to lose his electoral bid. Smith's brother, Milan Dale Smith Jr., is a federal judge appointed by President George W. Bush in 2006. Smith is a member of the board of directors of the International Republican Institute. In 2010, another second cousin, fellow Republican Mike Lee of Utah, was elected to the Senate.

On March 31, 2012, Smith was called as an area seventy in the LDS Church. He served until August 2022.

== Early political career ==
Smith entered politics with his election to the Oregon State Senate in 1992, and became president of that body in 1995. Later in 1995, he ran in a special election for a Senate seat vacated by the resignation of Bob Packwood, but was narrowly defeated in the January 1996 special election by then-Congressman Ron Wyden. Smith carried all but eight counties, but could not overcome an 89,000-vote deficit in Multnomah County, home to Portland–far exceeding the overall margin of 18,200 votes.

== U.S. Senate ==
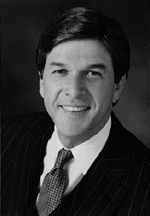
Smith during his first term in the U.S. Senate

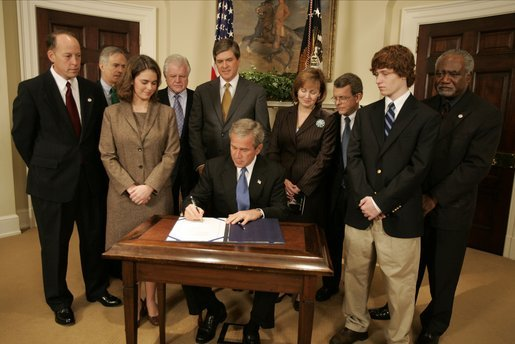
Smith watches as President George W. Bush signs the Garrett Lee Smith Memorial Act on October 21, 2004

=== Elections ===
U.S. Senator Mark Hatfield, a fellow Republican, announced his retirement later in 1996. Smith became the first person to run for the Senate twice in one year. This time he won, easily defeating Lon Mabon (whose organization, the Oregon Citizens Alliance, had previously endorsed Smith over Wyden) in the Republican primary and Democrat Tom Bruggere in the general election by a close margin. Before his election, Oregon had not elected a senator from the eastern part of the state since 1938.

Smith was re-elected in 2002, defeating Oregon Secretary of State Bill Bradbury by 210,389 votes.

Smith's approval rating was 52%, with 38% disapproving.

=== Political positions ===
In 1996, Smith was endorsed by the conservative political activist group the Oregon Citizens Alliance (OCA) in his race against Wyden. After losing that initial race for Packwood's seat, Smith then renounced the OCA endorsement and won in his subsequent race for the seat being vacated by Senator Hatfield.

In October 1999, Smith was one of four Republicans to vote in favor of the Comprehensive Test Ban Treaty. The treaty was designed to ban underground nuclear testing and was the first major international security pact to be defeated in the Senate since the Treaty of Versailles.

Smith is pro-life. In 2003, he voted for the Partial-Birth Abortion Ban Act, legislation that prohibits the intact dilation and extraction procedure.

In 2006, he voted to pass another controversial bill, this time crossing party lines to vote for the Stem Cell Research Enhancement Act. The measure, which would have expanded federal funding of stem cell research to cell lines extracted from embryos discarded during fertility treatment, became the first bill to be vetoed by President George W. Bush. Smith was one of 19 Senate Republicans who voted for the measure.

In January 2006, Smith began circulating a draft of the Digital Content Protection Act of 2006. The legislation would grant the Federal Communications Commission the authority to authorize a technology known as the "broadcast flag". This technology would enable the producers of television programming to ensure the programs cannot be recorded by viewers in their homes, for instance using a digital video recorder or onto recordable DVDs.

==== Conservatism ====
Smith is often described as politically moderate, but has strong conservative credentials as well. In a 2007 web video, Smith refers to "the values that make us Republicans, that make us conservatives".

Smith is a member of the moderate Republican Main Street Partnership, and a February 2006 National Journal congressional rating placed Smith in the exact ideological center of the Senate.

However, Smith is described as a moderate Republican by GovTrack.us, and throughout 2006 Smith voted with Republican leader Bill Frist (TN) 82 percent of the time. Based on five senate votes in 2006, the abortion rights advocacy group NARAL gave Smith a score of 15 percent on abortion rights (100 percent being a completely pro-choice score.) For votes cast in 2006, Smith received a 14 percent rating from the League of Conservation Voters (out of a possible 100 percent). Smith's votes have run contrary to widespread public sentiment on several issues, notably minimum wage and the Oregon Death with Dignity Act.

Smith was also a key advocate for embattled conservative Trent Lott's return to a leadership post within the Republican Party in 2006. Lott had resigned his position as Senate Republican Leader in 2002, following controversy surrounding his perceived support of Sen. Strom Thurmond's (R-SC) segregationist politics. After the party lost control of the Senate in November 2006, Republicans elected Lott to the post of Minority Whip (the second-highest Republican position in the Senate.) During the closed-door election, Sen. Judd Gregg (R-NH) nominated Lott for the position. Smith then seconded the nomination and delivered a supportive address before casting his vote. Lott defeated Sen. Lamar Alexander (R-TN) in a 25 to 24 vote.

==== War in Iraq ====
In October 2002, Smith voted in favor of authorizing military force against Iraq, an important step in the run-up to the March 2003 invasion. Smith was one of several Republican Senators for whom political concerns have clashed with party loyalty on the subject of the war in Iraq near an election year.

In December 2006 Smith spoke out against the war for the first time, after having voted in support of it four years prior. Smith said that to continue the current policy in Iraq "may even be criminal".

Several weeks after stating his opposition to the occupation of Iraq, however, Smith declined to sign onto a bipartisan resolution to oppose Bush's plan to escalate troop levels in Iraq by 21,500, prompting questions about the sincerity of his opposition to the continued US military presence in Iraq. Smith cited the controversial nature of the word "escalate" in defending his choice. The bill's sponsors have since changed the word to "increase." Smith expressed support for the bill, but subsequently voted to prevent it from being debated by the full Senate.

In March 2007, Smith was one of only two Republicans to vote for a resolution aimed at withdrawing most American combat troops from Iraq in 2008, the other being Chuck Hagel of Nebraska. The vote was 50 for to 48 against. Smith said in July 2007 that he would vote for a bill authorizing a timeline in which to leave Iraq. He was one of three Republican senators, the other two being Hagel and Olympia Snowe of Maine, to support the Levin Amendment (S.AMDT.2085) to the 2008 Defense Authorization bill (H.R.1585) that would begin a withdrawal of US forces from Iraq. Smith was willing to cross party lines in support of bills for withdrawing troops from Iraq.

In a private meeting with LDS Church leaders in 2009, Smith said that he supported the Iraq War because he "felt the Lord’s hand in it". He told the church leaders that he believed that the introduction of the "rule of law" would help the LDS Church spread into the Middle East.

==== Gay rights ====
Smith supported legislation expanding hate crime laws to encompass crimes against gays, and, with Senator Ted Kennedy, introduced such legislation in every Congress. As a result, he was one of a few Republican senators supported by gay rights groups in the United States, including the Human Rights Campaign. Smith also stood up in each Congress to talk about a separate hate crime as an illustration of why improved hate crime legislation was necessary, and had additional crimes published in the Congressional Record each day that Congress was in session.

Gay rights groups have expressed disappointment at Smith's support for the Federal Marriage Amendment in 2004, which would define marriage as between a man and a woman.

Leading up to the 2006 midterm elections, Smith joined Senate Democrats to introduce legislation that would guarantee homosexual employees of the federal government domestic partnership benefits.

=== Committee assignments ===
Smith chaired the Special Committee on Aging until Democrats took control of the Senate in 2007.

Smith served on the following Senate committees: Commerce, Science and Transportation, Energy and Natural Resources, Finance, and Indian Affairs.

He was the Ranking Member of the Senate Finance Subcommittee on International Trade and Global Competitiveness.

== Post-Senate career ==
In the aforementioned private meeting with LDS Church leaders in 2009, Smith shared information he said "may be classified" about Iran's nuclear program. (Smith's spokesman has since stated that none of the information shared was, in fact, classified.) Smith also mentioned instances in which he had pushed officials of various international governments to allow an increased LDS Church missionary presence in their countries.

Smith was named as president and CEO of the National Association of Broadcasters on September 18, 2009, and began his tenure with the trade association on November 1, 2009. Since then, Smith has led the association's lobbying efforts on Capitol Hill and at the Federal Communications Commission regarding issues affecting the television and radio broadcast industry. These issues include voluntary incentive auctions of broadcast TV spectrum, efforts by record labels to institute a performance fee on local radio stations for music airplay, and retransmission consent rules. Broadcast industry executives have credited Smith's leadership with improving NAB's lobbying clout and influence. In October 2012, Smith was named as one of Washington's top lobbyists by The Hill. He was named Radio Ink‘s Radio Executive Of The Year in 2018. He announced his retirement from the NAB, effective January 1, 2022 and was replaced by NAB’s Chief Operating Officer, Curtis LeGeyt.

=== LDS Church service ===
On March 31, 2012, Smith was called as an LDS Church area seventy. He was released from this position in August 2022. On March 19, 2025, he and his wife were announced as the LDS Church's directors of hosting.

== Electoral history ==
=== 2002 election ===
The 2002 Oregon United States Senate election was held on November 5, 2002 and was the first time Smith ran for re-election as senator. Smith easily defeated underfunded Democratic challenger, Oregon Secretary of State Bill Bradbury in the general election. He carried all but one county in the state, Multnomah County, home to Portland.

=== 2008 election ===
In Smith's second bid for re-election he faced State House Speaker Jeff Merkley. Smith earned 40% favorable and 20% unfavorable ratings in a December 2007 poll. Smith's office characterized the relatively low numbers as a reflection on Congress in general; a spokesman for Steve Novick's campaign (Novick lost to Merkley in the primary) suggested that the public was frustrated with elected officials and looking to outsiders to effect change, and Merkley's campaign highlighted Smith's shifts in position on the war in Iraq. The result was too close to call for almost two days. Ultimately, Merkley was declared the winner by 49% to 46%, with 5% going to David Brownlow, a Constitution Party candidate. While Smith carried all but six counties, he could not overcome a 142,000-vote deficit in Multnomah County.

In 2008, Smith's double second cousins, Democrats Tom and Mark Udall (see above), also ran in U.S. Senate elections, in New Mexico and Colorado respectively, and both won their races.

=== Table ===
Senate elections in Oregon results: 1996 (special), 1996–2008 (general)
Year	Democrat	Votes	Pct	Republican	Votes	Pct	3rd Party	Party	Votes	Pct	3rd Party	Party	Votes	Pct	3rd Party	Party	Votes	Pct	3rd Party	Party	Votes	Pct	
1996	Ron Wyden	571,739	48%	Gordon Smith	553,519	47%	Karen E. Shilling	American Independent	25,597	2%	Gene Nanni	Libertarian	15,698	1%	Vickie Valdez	Socialist	7,872	1%	Lou Gold	Pacific	7,225	1%	
1996	Tom Bruggere	624,370	46%	Gordon Smith	677,336	50%	Brent Thompson	Reform	20,381	1%	Gary Kutcher	Pacific	14,193	1%	Paul Mohn	Libertarian	12,697	1%	Christopher Phelps	Socialist	5,426	<1%	*
2002	Bill Bradbury	501,898	40%	Gordon Smith	712,287	56%	Dan Fitzgerald	Libertarian	29,979	2%	Lon Mabon	Constitution	21,703	2%									*
2008	Jeff Merkley	864,392	49%	Gordon Smith	805,159	46%	David Brownlow	Constitution	92,565	5%													*

*Write-in and minor candidate notes: In 1996, Michael L. Hoyes of the Natural Law Party received 4,425 votes and other minor candidates received 1,402 votes. In 2002, minor candidates received 1,354 votes. In 2008, minor candidates received 5,388 votes.

== See also ==
- Lee–Hamblin family

Oregon Senate
Preceded by Bill Bradbury	President of the Oregon Senate; 1995–1997	Succeeded by Brady Adams
Party political offices
Preceded by Bob Packwood	Republican nominee for U.S. Senator from Oregon (Class 3); 1996	Succeeded by John Lim
Preceded by Mark Hatfield	Republican nominee for U.S. Senator from Oregon (Class 2); 1996, 2002, 2008	Succeeded by Monica Wehby
U.S. Senate
Preceded by Mark Hatfield	U.S. Senator (Class 2) from Oregon; 1997–2009; Served alongside: Ron Wyden	Succeeded by Jeff Merkley
Preceded by Larry Craig	Chair of the Senate Aging Committee; 2005–2007	Succeeded by Herb Kohl
Preceded by Herb Kohl	Ranking Member of the Senate Aging Committee; 2007–2009	Succeeded by Mel Martínez
U.S. order of precedence (ceremonial)
Preceded by Rudy Boschwitz as Former U.S. Senator	Order of precedence of the United States as Former U.S. Senator	Succeeded by Richard Bryan as Former U.S. Senator
