= George H. Taylor (meteorologist) =

American climatologist

- Born: June 27, 1927 (age 99); Santa Barbara, California
- Died: November 8, 2022 (aged 95)
- Education: UCSB, University of Utah
- Known for: Climate change skepticism
- Scientific career
- Fields: Climatology, meteorology
- Workplaces: Oregon State University
- Thesis: An airborne pollution-monitoring program in an area of complex mountain-valley terrain (1975)

George H. Taylor (June 27, 1927 — November 8, 2022) was the director of the Oregon Climate Service at Oregon State University in Corvallis from 1989 until his retirement on 1 May 2008.

== Education and career ==
Born in Santa Barbara, California, Taylor held a B.A. in mathematics from the University of California, Santa Barbara (1969) and a M.S. in meteorology from the University of Utah (1975). In 1989, he became the director of the Oregon Climate Service at Oregon State University (OSU); in this capacity, he tracked weather and issued long-range weather forecasts for the state of Oregon. Beginning in 1991, he was popularly known as "Oregon's state climatologist." However, in 2007, the then-governor of Oregon, Ted Kulongoski, said that there was no such position in the state and demanded that Taylor stop using such a title, saying "he's not my weatherman".

Taylor was also the president of the American Association of State Climatologists from 1998 to 2000. In 2008, after he retired from OSU, he founded, and became the president of, the consulting firm Applied Climate Services.

== Views on global warming ==
Taylor expressed a skeptical position on global warming. While his position was at odds with the scientific consensus on the topic, he argued that "consensus in science doesn't really mean much. What matters is the truth. Often consensus is wrong." Taylor considered global warming to be primarily caused by natural variability, not human activity, though he acknowledged that both have played a role. In 2005, Taylor testified before the Environment Committee of the Oregon House of Representatives in opposition to a bill that would increase the fuel efficiency standards for automobiles in Oregon to match California's. In his testimony, he said, "I believe the effect of greenhouse gas is a relatively minor one," and "I really believe natural variation and natural factors are a bigger cause of climate change than you and I."

== Personal life ==
Taylor was a vegetarian, rode a bike to Oregon State University when he worked there, and engaged in many environmentalist practices.

== Death ==
Taylor died November 8, 2022 suffering from Parkinson's Disease and Lewy Body Dementia.
