= AASC =

AASC may refer to:

- Australian Army Service Corps
- American Association of State Climatologists
- Avon and Somerset Constabulary, the territorial police force covering Avon and Somerset, England
