= 2006 Oregon gubernatorial election =

- November 7, 2006
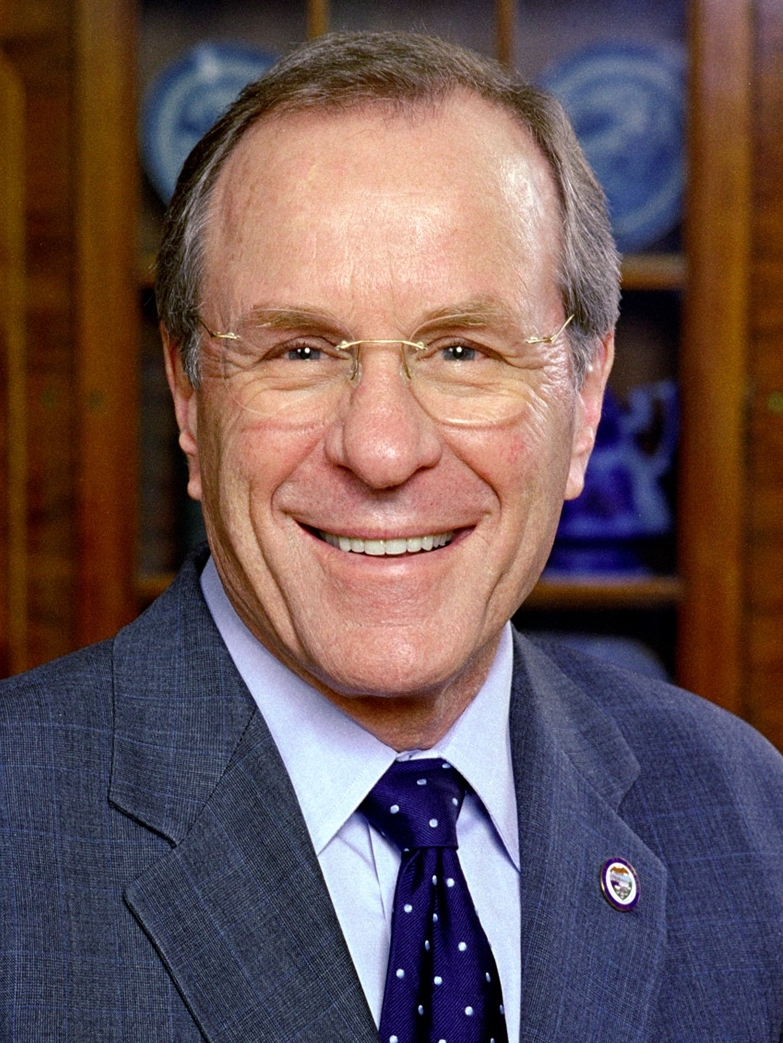

Nominee	Ted Kulongoski	Ron Saxton
Party	Democratic	Republican
Popular vote	699,786	589,748
Percentage	50.73%	42.75%
- County results Kulongoski: 40–50% 50–60% 60–70% Saxton: 40–50% 50–60% 60–70% 70–80%
Governor before election
Ted Kulongoski
Democratic
Elected Governor
Ted Kulongoski
Democratic

The 2006 Oregon gubernatorial election took place on November 7, 2006. Incumbent Democratic Governor Ted Kulongoski ran for a second and final term. He faced several challengers in his primary, whom he dispatched to win his party's nomination a second time, while Republican nominee Ron Saxton, the former chair of the Portland Public Schools Board and a candidate for governor in 2002 emerged from a crowded primary. Kulongoski and Saxton were initially going to be challenged in the general election by State Senator Ben Westlund, but Westlund withdrew his candidacy before the general election. There were multiple independent and third party challengers on the ballot as well. In a hard-fought campaign, Kulongoski won re-election by a surprisingly wide margin. As of 2026, this marks the last occasion in which Columbia, Marion, and Wasco counties have voted Democratic in a gubernatorial election.

== Democratic primary ==
Democratic primary results by county: Ted Kulongoski: 60–65% 55–60% 50–55% 45–50% 40–45%; Jim Hill: 40–45%

=== Candidates ===
- Jim Hill, former Oregon State Treasurer, 2002 Democratic candidate for Governor of Oregon
- Ted Kulongoski, incumbent Governor of Oregon
- Peter Sorenson, Lane County Commissioner

=== Results ===
Democratic Primary results
Party	Candidate	Votes	%
Democratic	Ted Kulongoski (inc.)	170,944	53.56%
Democratic	Jim Hill	92,439	28.96%
Democratic	Pete Sorenson	51,346	16.09%
Democratic	Scattering	4,448	1.39%
Total votes		319,177	100.00%

== Republican primary ==
Republican primary results by county: Ron Saxton: 50–55% 45–50% 40–45% 35–40%; Kevin Mannix: 35–40% 30–35%; Jason Atkinson: 45–50% 35–40%

=== Candidates ===
- Jason Atkinson, Oregon State Senator
- David W. Beem
- W. Ames Curtright
- Bob Leonard Forthan, perennial candidate
- Gordon Leitch
- Kevin Mannix, former Oregon State Representative, 2002 Republican nominee for Governor of Oregon
- Ron Saxton, former chair of the Portland Public Schools Board
- William E. Spidal

=== Results ===
Republican primary results
Party	Candidate	Votes	%
Republican	Ron Saxton	125,286	41.69%
Republican	Kevin Mannix	89,553	29.80%
Republican	Jason Atkinson	67,057	22.31%
Republican	W. Ames Curtright	7,414	2.47%
Republican	Gordon Leitch	3,100	1.03%
Republican	William E. Spidal	2,537	0.84%
Republican	David W. Beem	1,659	0.55%
Republican	Bob Leonard Forthan	841	0.28%
Republican	Scattering	3,107	1.03%
Total votes		300,554	100.00%

== General election ==
=== Campaign ===
As the Democratic and Republican primaries intensified, State Senator Ben Westlund, a registered Republican, announced that he would run for governor as an independent. Though Westlund gathered the requisite signatures to be able to run, he eventually dropped out of the race in August, noting, "At the beginning of this campaign, I made a commitment to the people of Oregon, that I was in it to win it, and that I absolutely would not play a spoiler role." Constitution Party nominee Mary Starrett was widely perceived to win votes largely at the expense of Saxton's campaign.

=== Predictions ===
Source	Ranking	As of
The Cook Political Report	Tossup	November 6, 2006
Sabato's Crystal Ball	Tilt D	November 6, 2006
Rothenberg Political Report	Lean D	November 2, 2006
Real Clear Politics	Lean D	November 6, 2006

=== Polling ===
Poll source	Date administered	Ted Kulongoski (D)	Ron Saxton (R)	Mary Starrett (C)	Richard Morley (L)	Joe Keating (G)
KATU/Oregonian	October 31, 2006	45%	38%	6%	1%	1%
Rasmussen	October 31, 2006	51%	44%	—	—	—
Riley Research	October 25, 2006	47%	36%	4%	1%	1%
Riley Research	October 3, 2006	37%	39%	2%	1%	1%
Rasmussen	October 1, 2006	47%	42%	—	—	—
Rasmussen	September 25, 2006	47%	38%	—	—	—
Zogby Interactive Poll	September 11, 2006	47%	40%	5%	1%	—
Zogby Interactive Poll	August 28, 2006	50%	44%	—	—	—
Rasmussen	August 22, 2006	49%	35%	—	—	—
Rasmussen	August 3, 2006	45%	35%	—	—	—
Zogby Interactive Poll	July 24, 2006	49%	42%	—	—	—
Zogby Interactive Poll	June 21, 2006	48%	40%	—	—	—
Rasmussen	May 23, 2006	43%	41%	—	—	—
Zogby Interactive Poll	March 22–27, 2006	46%	39%	—	—	—
Rasmussen	February 27, 2006	47%	33%	—	—	—

=== Results ===
2006 Oregon gubernatorial election
Party	Candidate	Votes	%	±%
Democratic	Ted Kulongoski (inc.)	699,786	50.73%	+1.70%
Republican	Ron Saxton	589,748	42.75%	−3.40%
Constitution	Mary Starrett	50,229	3.64%	
Pacific Green	Joe Keating	20,030	1.45%	
Libertarian	Richard Morley	16,798	1.22%	−3.36%
Write-in	Scattering	2,884	0.21%	
Total votes		1,379,475	100.00%	
Majority		110,038	7.98%	
Democratic hold		Swing	+5.10%	

=== Results by county ===
County	Ted Kulongoski Democratic		Kevin Mannix Republican		Mary Starrett Constitution		Joe Keating Green		Richard Morley Libertarian		Scattering Write-in		Margin		Total votes cast
County	#	%	#	%	#	%	#	%	#	%	#	%	#	%	Total votes cast
Baker	2,508	34.07%	4,338	58.93%	362	4.92%	71	0.96%	71	0.96%	11	0.15%	-1,830	-24.86%	7,361
Benton	20,661	58.69%	12,736	36.18%	559	1.59%	735	2.09%	456	1.30%	58	0.16%	7,925	22.51%	35,205
Clackamas	70,131	48.29%	65,795	45.30%	6,405	4.41%	1,373	0.95%	1,335	0.92%	198	0.14%	4,336	2.99%	145,237
Clatsop	7,936	53.12%	5,886	39.40%	666	4.46%	254	1.70%	181	1.21%	17	0.11%	2,050	13.72%	14,940
Columbia	9,291	47.89%	8,032	41.40%	1,577	8.13%	226	1.16%	238	1.23%	38	0.20%	1,259	6.49%	19,402
Coos	10,977	43.64%	12,103	48.12%	1,215	4.83%	416	1.65%	410	1.63%	31	0.12%	-1,126	-4.48%	25,152
Crook	2,518	30.14%	5,333	63.85%	313	3.75%	69	0.83%	98	1.17%	22	0.26%	-2,815	-33.70%	8,353
Curry	4,162	41.09%	5,332	52.64%	282	2.78%	165	1.63%	158	1.56%	31	0.31%	-1,170	-11.55%	10,130
Deschutes	23,631	40.85%	31,256	54.04%	1,368	2.37%	784	1.36%	682	1.18%	122	0.21%	-7,625	-13.18%	57,843
Douglas	15,123	35.49%	24,896	58.42%	1,384	3.25%	506	1.19%	639	1.50%	64	0.15%	-9,773	-22.93%	42,612
Gilliam	388	38.92%	535	53.66%	53	5.32%	5	0.50%	10	1.00%	6	0.60%	-147	-14.74%	997
Grant	783	23.26%	2,401	71.31%	118	3.50%	20	0.59%	39	1.16%	6	0.18%	-1,618	-48.05%	3,367
Harney	643	21.38%	2,186	72.70%	119	3.96%	15	0.50%	36	1.20%	8	0.27%	-1,543	-51.31%	3,007
Hood River	4,352	58.54%	2,554	34.36%	331	4.45%	124	1.67%	63	0.85%	10	0.13%	1,798	24.19%	7,434
Jackson	33,329	43.25%	39,055	50.68%	2,183	2.83%	1,281	1.66%	1,017	1.32%	192	0.25%	-5,726	-7.43%	77,057
Jefferson	2,776	41.38%	3,511	52.34%	278	4.14%	49	0.73%	81	1.21%	13	0.19%	-735	-10.96%	6,708
Josephine	11,900	36.39%	18,321	56.02%	1,398	4.27%	525	1.61%	474	1.45%	86	0.26%	-6,421	-19.63%	32,704
Klamath	6,592	27.85%	15,651	66.12%	823	3.48%	262	1.11%	304	1.28%	38	0.16%	-9,059	-38.27%	23,670
Lake	723	23.26%	2,156	69.37%	132	4.25%	32	1.03%	51	1.64%	14	0.45%	-1,433	-46.11%	3,108
Lane	81,550	58.31%	50,290	35.96%	2,895	2.07%	2,770	1.98%	1,920	1.37%	422	0.30%	31,260	22.35%	139,847
Lincoln	10,145	51.61%	8,072	41.06%	730	3.71%	420	2.14%	271	1.38%	20	0.10%	2,073	10.55%	19,658
Linn	15,588	39.13%	21,411	53.74%	1,769	4.44%	482	1.21%	518	1.30%	71	0.18%	-5,823	-14.62%	39,839
Malheur	2,357	29.10%	5,296	65.37%	273	3.37%	75	0.93%	94	1.16%	6	0.07%	-2,939	-36.28%	8,101
Marion	45,304	46.64%	44,474	45.79%	4,968	5.12%	1,083	1.12%	962	0.99%	335	0.34%	830	0.85%	97,126
Morrow	1,043	33.87%	1,797	58.36%	178	5.78%	23	0.75%	33	1.07%	5	0.16%	-754	-24.49%	3,079
Multnomah	177,797	68.44%	65,488	25.21%	8,022	3.09%	5,033	1.94%	3,010	1.16%	454	0.17%	112,309	43.23%	259,804
Polk	12,620	46.22%	12,643	46.30%	1,351	4.95%	312	1.14%	314	1.15%	64	0.23%	-23	-0.08%	27,304
Sherman	331	35.36%	529	56.52%	54	5.77%	10	1.07%	10	1.07%	2	0.21%	-198	-21.15%	936
Tillamook	5,356	49.42%	4,745	43.78%	473	4.36%	136	1.25%	109	1.01%	19	0.18%	611	5.64%	10,838
Umatilla	7,182	37.86%	10,554	55.64%	775	4.09%	193	1.02%	243	1.28%	22	0.12%	-3,372	-17.78%	18,969
Union	3,961	39.23%	5,473	54.20%	403	3.99%	128	1.27%	114	1.13%	19	0.19%	-1,512	-14.97%	10,098
Wallowa	1,253	32.99%	2,335	61.48%	112	2.95%	38	1.00%	57	1.50%	3	0.08%	-1,082	-28.49%	3,798
Wasco	4,307	47.00%	4,057	44.27%	547	5.97%	121	1.32%	117	1.28%	15	0.16%	250	2.73%	9,164
Washington	88,292	51.10%	73,907	42.77%	6,133	3.55%	1,954	1.13%	2,275	1.32%	222	0.13%	14,385	8.33%	172,783
Wheeler	233	31.74%	422	57.49%	52	7.08%	9	1.23%	13	1.77%	5	0.68%	-189	-25.75%	734
Yamhill	14,043	42.41%	16,178	48.86%	1,928	5.82%	331	1.00%	395	1.19%	235	0.71%	-2,135	-6.45%	33,110
Total	699,786	50.73%	589,748	42.75%	50,229	3.64%	20,030	1.45%	16,798	1.22%	2,884	0.21%	110,038	7.98%	1,379,475

==== Counties that flipped from Republican to Democratic ====
- Clackamas (largest city: Lake Oswego)
- Marion (largest city: Salem)
- Wasco (largest city: The Dalles)
- Washington (largest city: Hillsboro)

== See also ==
- 2006 Oregon statewide elections
- 2006 United States gubernatorial elections
- List of governors of Oregon
