= Randall Edwards (politician) =

American politician (born 1961)

26th Oregon State Treasurer
- In office January 1, 2001 – January 4, 2009
- Governor: John Kitzhaber; Ted Kulongoski
- Preceded by: Jim Hill
- Succeeded by: Ben Westlund

Oregon State Representative District 15 (Portland)
- In office 1997–2001
- Preceded by: Lisa Naito
- Succeeded by: Steve March

Personal details
- Born: August 13, 1961 (age 65) Eugene, Oregon, U.S.
- Party: Democrat
- Spouse: Julia Brim-Edwards
- Children: 3
- Education: George Washington University
- Occupation: Politician

Randall Edwards (born August 13, 1961) is an American politician who most recently served as the state treasurer of the state of Oregon. A Democrat, Edwards was elected as treasurer in 2000 and reelected in 2004, after serving two terms in the Oregon Legislative Assembly. He also served as a manager and senior advisor at the Oregon State Treasury from 1992–1996, and was an International Trade Analyst for the U.S. Commerce Department.

== Early life and background ==
=== Childhood ===
Edwards was born in Eugene, Oregon, USA, but spent much of his childhood in Walla Walla, Washington. His father, Tom Edwards, taught history at Whitman College while his mother worked as a public school teacher for more than 20 years.

The young Edwards showed little interest in politics - despite being described as bright and popular, he was reserved and shunned the attention of involvement in student government. He applied himself, instead, to his studies, competitive tennis, and mastery of classical cello. His father would later comment to the press that he never imagined that his son would take to the rough and tumble world of politics. "Over the years, as a college professor, I tried to get people interested in politics, but they rejected it," said the retired professor, now living near his son in Portland. "What I didn't realize was that one of my own children would do what I was trying to get my students to do."

=== College ===
Edwards went on to Colorado College, graduating in 1983 with a bachelor's degree in economics. After college he worked on agricultural issues as a member of U.S. Senator Bob Packwood's constituent services staff in Washington, D.C. There he met Julia Brim, a Packwood press aide, who would become his wife.

Edwards later worked on timber management policy at the Commerce Department while attending night classes at George Washington University. He earned his MBA in 1990.

=== Return to Oregon ===
In 1992, Edwards and his wife moved to Portland, Oregon, her hometown, where they still make their home with their three children. She continued to work on Senator Packwood's staff for one more year, then managed Craig Berkman's unsuccessful gubernatorial campaign. Edwards took a position on Oregon State Treasurer Jim Hill's staff. Julia Brim-Edwards is a deputy director for state government and public affairs for Nike, Inc. and former Portland Public Schools co-chair.

== Legislative career ==
=== 1996 elections ===
Edwards' first elective office was as a member of the Oregon Legislative Assembly. In 1996, he sought nomination to the open seat for the 15th District in the state House of Representatives. The incumbent, Lisa Naito, had chosen not to seek reelection. He was challenged in the Democratic primary by Steve March, 49, a senior management auditor for Multnomah County and part-time college teacher, and Harry D. Ainsworth, 32, a lawyer. Edwards secured the nomination with 2,587 votes to March's 2,245 and Ainsworth's 815, going on to face Republican Mark Lewis, whom he defeated 12,998 to 5,697.

=== First term in Oregon House ===
As a freshman legislator, Edwards introduced a 1997 bill empowering local governments to double traffic fines in school zones, and preventing judges from reducing the penalties. Modeled after similar legislation applying to construction zones, the bill passed and was signed into law the same year. Bucking his own party's leadership and drawing the ire of the Oregon Education Association, Edwards inserted a provision in a school funding bill requiring audits of school districts' classification of students, a move opposed by then Democratic Governor John Kitzhaber. Since state support doubles for students with disabilities and includes extra funds for certain other types of students, the proposal sought to insure such students were counted accurately.

Edwards regained the confidence of pro-education activists when he cast the sole dissenting vote in a 7-to-1 Revenue Committee decision to add U.S.$67 million in additional tax cuts to Measure 50, in an election for which ballots had already gone out. The referendum was intended to reverse even deeper cuts which had been enacted by Measure 47 the previous November. The committee action was taken under threat by anti-tax activist Bill Sizemore to withdraw his support from Measure 50, which already granted $804 million in tax relief. Sizemore said he was prepared kill the measure with a last minute advertising blitz if the additional cuts were not approved. Edwards objected on the grounds that any increase in Measure 50's cuts would require too great a curtailment of government services, especially in education.

By the end of his first legislative session, despite being a newcomer and member of the minority party, he had gained a reputation as an effective pro-education politician and was described as a "virtual education bill machine." In addition to writing legislation he managed to get much of it passed, making few long-term political enemies. He was willing to take stands differing with fellow Portland Democrat Chris Beck on methods for funding the state park system, and by pushing for higher funding for education than was included in the Governor's proposed budget. "I've made education my top issue in the session," Edwards said in an interview after the close of the session. "It's the top issue in my district and the top issue in the state."

=== 1998 reelection and second term ===
Randall ran unopposed in both the primary and general elections, and was reelected to a second term as state representative. When the legislature convened the following year the agenda included a large number of education-related issues, many steeped in controversy. Bills carried over or already announced included measures relating to charter schools, discipline, accountability for performance and class size, and spending on education.

His committee assignments for the session included seats on both the Judiciary and Rules committees and membership on the Education subcommittee of Ways and Means.

Edwards co-sponsored a bill with State Senator Randy Miller (Republican-Lake Oswego) to put a cap on public school class sizes in kindergarten and primary grades (K-6), after supporting a measure to expand the charter school program over his stated reservations that their existence was necessitated by a failure to provide adequate funding to public schools.

The legislature's work was not limited to education issues. With Representative Jim Hill, (Republican-Hillsboro), Randall introduced a bill to require the Oregon Board of Medical Examiners to make a broad range of information about the state's physicians available online. This would have included complaints filed against a doctor through a hospital peer review committee, internal review board, the Oregon Health Division, or the state medical board, as well as pending malpractice claims. He also joined a bipartisan coalition of 17 Democrats and 11 Republicans in sponsoring a ballot referendum that would require a three-fifths majority vote to pass constitutional amendments by initiative. The second-term legislator also sought to defuse a particularly controversial "defense of marriage" constitutional amendment then under consideration by offering an alternative measure which removed language overturning an earlier court decision granting spousal benefits to same-sex partners of state employees. His attempt at compromise failed and the original referendum was approved by voters the following year.

== Tenure as State Treasurer ==
=== 2000 elections ===
Edwards had his eye on the State Treasurer's post from the time he had worked as then Treasurer Jim Hill's legislative adviser from 1992 to 1996. "When I worked in the treasurer's office, I thought that this could be a job I could do," Edwards told the Oregonian in 2001, "I was intrigued and impressed with what the job entailed."

In 2000, when Hill was prevented by law from running for a third term, Edwards announced his candidacy for Treasurer. Edwards' colleagues in the Democratic party considered him a clear favorite in the primary campaign, challenged only by Gary Bruebaker, a Deputy Treasurer with no prior political experience. However, the race remained too close to call throughout election night and automatically triggered a two-month-long hand recount. Ultimately, Edwards prevailed, defeating Bruebaker by a mere 470 votes statewide, 152,071 to 151,601.

John Kvistad, a small-business owner from Tigard who had been elected to three terms on the Metro governing council, was nominated as Edwards' Republican opponent. During the general election campaign Edwards emphasized his financial and legislative experience, stressing the importance of the State Treasurer's role in funding education. He presented a plan to create a $100 million capital bond fund for school construction projects. Kvistad countered by pointing out Edwards' lack of experience outside of the public sector, and reminding voters of his own management background in both business and government. He promised to improve the state's credit rating and implement a program to assist first-time home buyers. He was especially critical of Edwards' votes to increase the state's debt to fund schools.

The campaign became contentious, particularly during a debate between the candidates sponsored by the City Club of Portland. Edwards claimed his Republican challenger had "no plan" and was underqualified for the office. Kvistad accused Edwards of exaggerating his financial experience and attacked Edwards' school construction bond proposal, stating "Instead of putting you in the state treasurer's office, maybe we need to put you in Consumer Credit Counseling Service." Edwards responded that the treasurer had an obligation to address the issue of school financing as one of Oregon's most critical concerns, adding "You don't support helping our public schools."

The final result was a decisive win for Edwards, defeating Kvistad 705,273 votes to 593,411. The race was also joined by Constitution Party nominee Carlos Luceros, a computer software consultant who wanted to invest even more resources in education; Libertarian Mitchell T. Shults, an Intel executive who ran on a platform of reduced state spending, sale of state owned lands, and reform of the state employees' retirement system; and Leonard Zack of the Reform Party, a food service worker whose campaign centered on environmental issues.

=== First term as treasurer ===
In a ceremony at the Gus Solomon Federal Courthouse in downtown Portland on January 1, 2001, Edwards, 39, was sworn in as the youngest Oregon State Treasurer in at least fifty years. The record of his predecessor would be difficult to meet: during Hill's two terms in office, the treasury's investments had increased in value by nearly 150 percent, and debt had been decreased 25 percent. Edwards faced a host of difficult issues, including an economic slowdown, the potential downgrade of the state's credit rating, and serious reductions in federal contributions to the state's revenues.

By 2003, with what the state's chief economist Tom Potiowsky described as a "jobless recovery" dragging on, Edwards was coping with announcements of large state budget shortfalls which forced the legislature to make deep cuts in services and increase both taxes and borrowing.

=== 2004 reelection campaign ===
After the 2004 Democratic primary in which Edwards was unopposed, he won reelection to a second term over his three general election challengers: Republican Jeff Caton, Constitution Party nominee Carole D. Weingarden, and Libertarian Mitch Shults. The final tally was Edwards, 889,974; Caton, 688,551; Shults, 52,819; and Weingarden, 49,875.

During his second term, Edwards oversaw a $70 billion investment portfolio and created the Oregon College Savings Plan, which allowed Oregonians to save up to $2,000 per year tax-free for college education. He also issued bonds to meet the state's capital needs and managed public lands as a member of the State Land Board alongside the Governor and Secretary of State. Edwards left office on January 4, 2009, and was succeeded by Ben Westlund.

== Electoral history ==
2004 Oregon State Treasurer election
Party	Candidate	Votes	%
Democratic	Randall Edwards	889,974	52.9
Republican	Jeff Caton	688,551	40.9
Libertarian	Mitch Shults	52,819	3.1
Constitution	Carole D. Winegarden	49,875	3.0
Write-in		2,284	0.1
Total votes		1,683,503	100%

Political offices
Preceded by Jim Hill	Treasurer of Oregon; 2001–2009	Succeeded by Ben Westlund
