= Ron Saxton =

American lawyer, businessman and politician (born 1954)

Member of the Portland Public Schools Board of Education, Zone 6
- In office 1997–2001
- Preceded by: Carol Turner
- Succeeded by: Julia Brim-Edwards

Personal details
- Born: 1954 Albany, Oregon, U.S.
- Party: Republican
- Education: Willamette University (BA); University of Virginia (JD)

Ronald L. Saxton (born 1954) is an American lawyer, business person, and Republican politician in Oregon. He has run twice for Governor of Oregon, losing in the 2002 primary election, and winning the Republican nomination in 2006, but losing in the general election.

== Early life and career ==
Saxton was born and raised in Albany, Oregon. He graduated from Albany High School in 1972, earned a bachelor's degree from Willamette University in 1976, and a juris doctor at from University of Virginia School of Law in 1979.

Saxton helped to co-found the Ater Wynne law firm in 1990. From 1990 to 2000 he served as the chairman of the firm.

== Political career ==
=== Portland Public Schools ===
In 1997, Saxton was elected to the Portland Public Schools Board serving through 2001, and served as its chair from 1998 to 2000. Saxton was also the founding president of the Portland Schools Foundation, a community-based organization that has raised over $30 million in private contributions in Oregon's largest school district. He has also chaired the Strategic Planning committee of the Cascade Pacific Council of the Boy Scouts, co-chaired the Oregon Higher Education Roundtable, and served on the board of the Saturday Academy, a science and math mentoring program for Oregon's youth.. He also served on the Oregon Education Investment Board, Oregon Business Council education committee and served as education advisor to Gov. Kitzhaber.

=== 2002 run for Governor ===
In 2002, Saxton unsuccessfully sought the Republican nomination for Governor of Oregon. He placed third in the primary behind Kevin Mannix and Jack Roberts.

=== 2006 Gubernatorial nomination ===
On March 23, 2005, Saxton announced that he would again seek the Republican nomination for governor in 2006. Kevin Mannix also ran again, and State Senator Jason Atkinson ran a strong campaign as well. Saxton won the Republican primary for Governor of Oregon on May 16, 2006 with 43% of the vote, versus Mannix's 30% and Atkinson's 22%. On November 7, 2006, Saxton was defeated by Democratic incumbent Ted Kulongoski.

=== Governor's transition team ===
In 2010, Saxton was appointed to Democratic governor John Kitzhaber's transition team, focusing on educational issues. His wife was selected as well to focus on early childhood issues.

== Later life ==
Following the election, Saxton announced he was unlikely to run for political office again. In 2007, he joined global door and window manufacturer Jeld-Wen as an executive, eventually serving as EVP, Chief Administrative Officer and a member of the Board. Saxton left Jeld-Wen in 2014 to return to private practice as a partner with Schwabe, Williamson & Wyatt in Portland and in 2015 joined Pacific Northwest healthcare system PeaceHealth as EVP and General Counsel. He retired from PeaceHealth in 2023.

More recently, he has served on the Oregon Educational Investment Board and a board member and Board Chair at Oregon Public Broadcasting. Saxton serviced on a variety of business civic boards including National Association of Manufacturers, Oregon Business Council and Oregon Association of Hospitals and Health Systems. He has served on several corporate boards of directors including JELD-WEN, Swift Energy, Parr Lumber, Columbia Forest Products, WellRithms, Repatriate Medical Supplies, and Oregon Freeze Dry.

== Personal life ==
Saxton is married to Lynne Hume Saxton, also a fourth generation Oregonian, and together they have one son, Andy. The Saxton family are adherents to the Presbyterian faith.

Party political offices
Preceded by Kevin Mannix	Republican nominee for Governor of Oregon; 2006	Succeeded by Chris Dudley
