= 1980 United States Senate election in Oregon =

- November 4, 1980
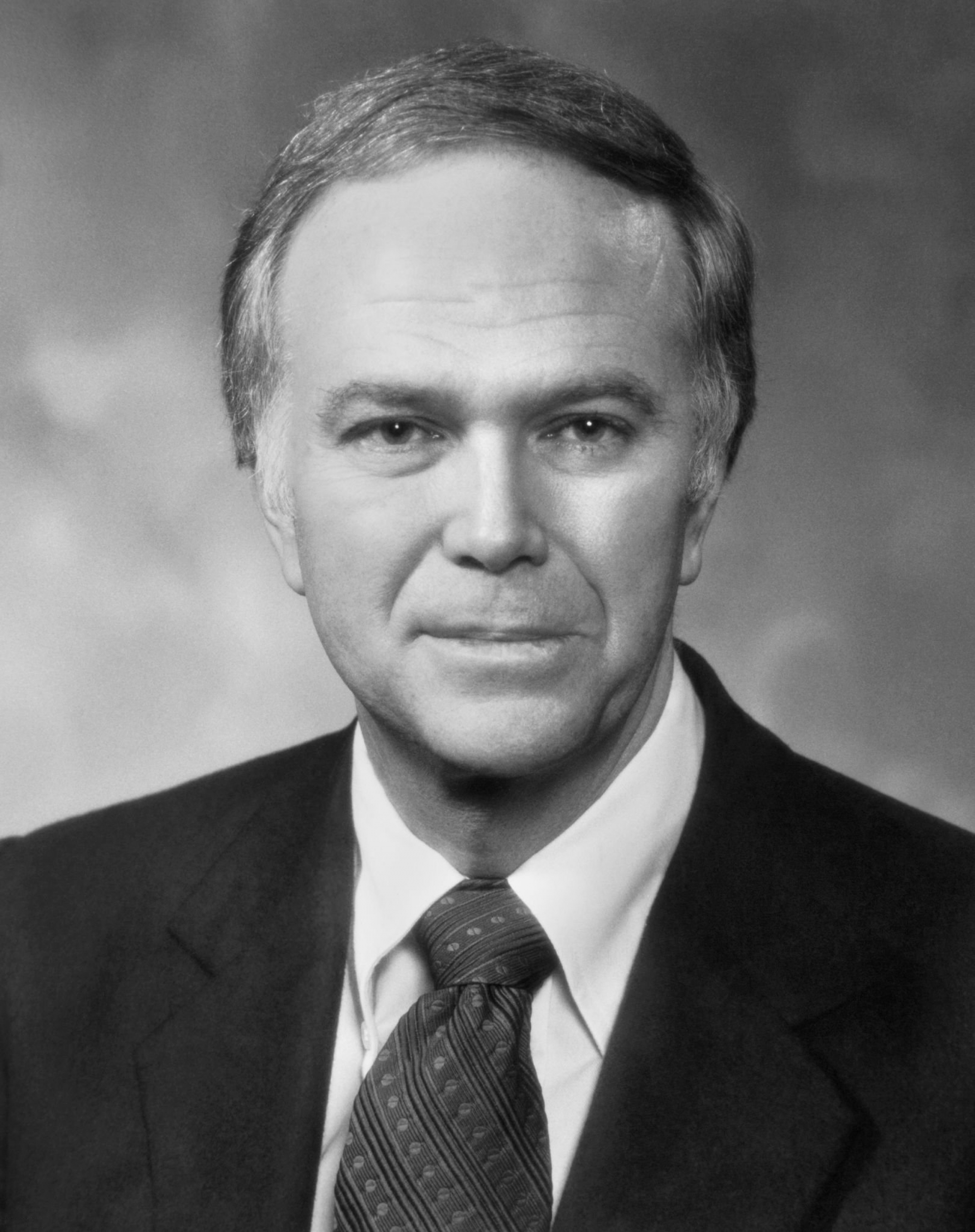

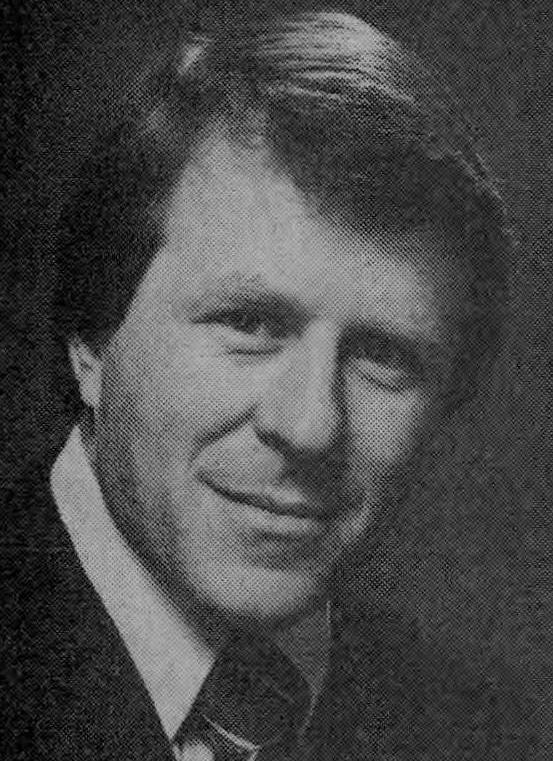
Nominee	Bob Packwood	Ted Kulongoski
Party	Republican	Democratic
Popular vote	594,290	501,963
Percentage	52.13%	44.03%
- County results Packwood: 40–50% 50–60% 60–70% Kulongoski: 40–50% 50–60%
U.S. senator before election
Bob Packwood
Republican
Elected U.S. Senator
Bob Packwood
Republican

The 1980 Oregon United States Senate election was held on November 4, 1980 to select the U.S. Senator from the state of Oregon. Republican candidate Bob Packwood was re-elected to a third term, defeating Democratic state senator (and future governor) Ted Kulongoski and Libertarian Tonie Nathan.

== Primaries ==
=== Volcano eruption ===
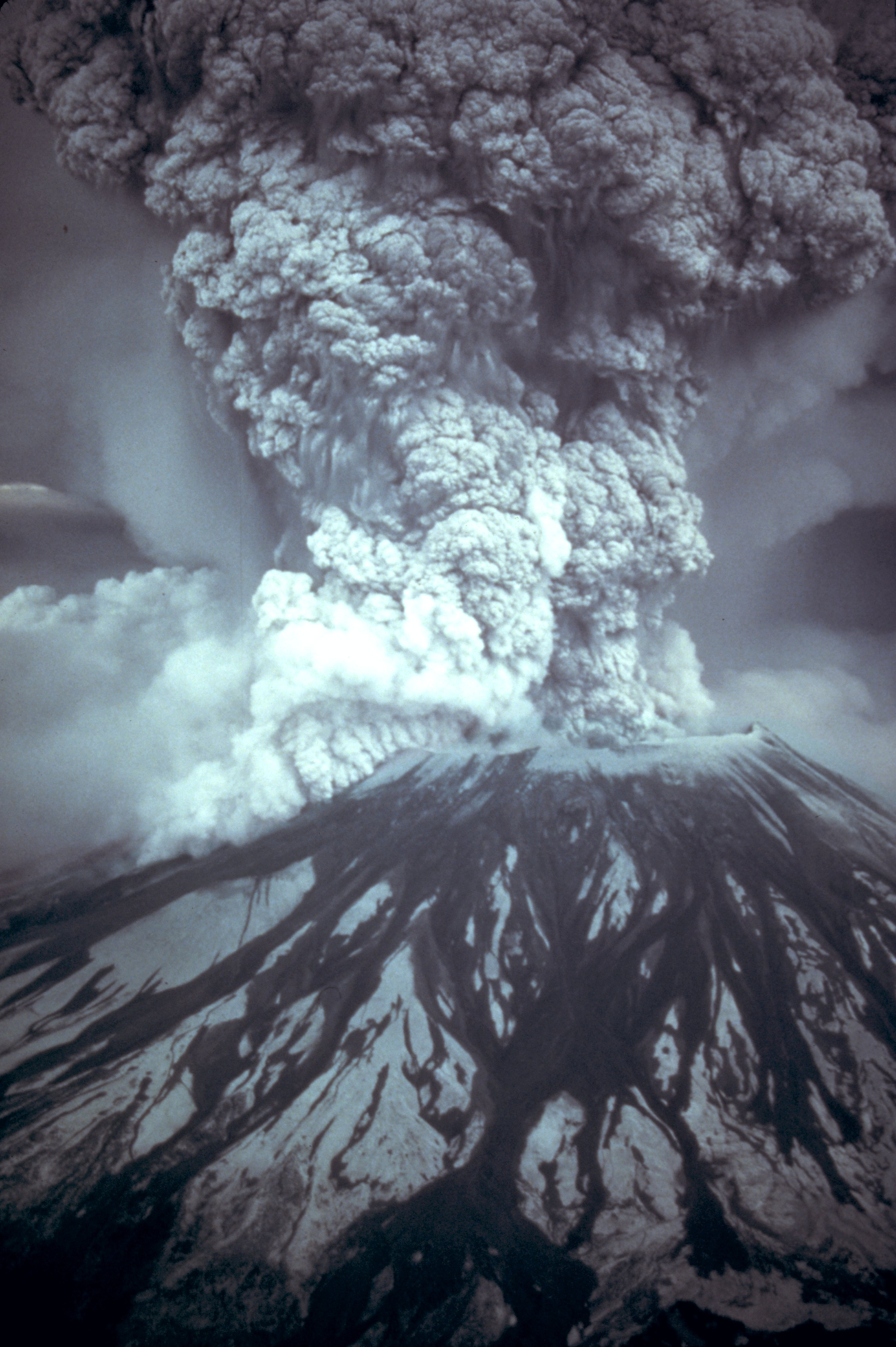
Mount St. Helens erupted two days before the Oregon primaries.

The primary elections were held on May 20, 1980 in conjunction with the Democratic and Republican presidential primaries. Interest in the primaries was somewhat subdued because they occurred just two days after the eruption of Mount St. Helens, about 60 miles (97 km) north of Oregon's most populous city, Portland. The eruption (which was a VEI = 5 event) was the first significant one to occur in the contiguous 48 U.S. states since the 1915 eruption of California's Lassen Peak.

=== Republican primary ===
==== Campaign ====
In the Republican primary, incumbent Senator Bob Packwood was running for a third term. With his moderate stance on issues such as abortion, several conservative challengers filed to challenge Packwood in the Republican primary. These included Brenda Jose, the vice chairman of the Oregon Republican Party, and Rosalie Huss, who was the wife of Walter Huss, an ultraconservative minister who had been chair of the Oregon Republican Party before being ousted by a moderate and liberal coalition, which included Packwood and Republican governor Victor G. Atiyeh. Packwood went on to defeat all challengers by a wide margin.

==== Results ====
Republican primary for the United States Senate from Oregon, 1980
Party	Candidate	Votes	%
Republican	Bob Packwood (incumbent)	191,127	62.43%
Republican	Brenda Jose	45,973	15.02%
Republican	Kenneth Brown	23,599	7.71%
Republican	Rosalie Huss	22,929	7.49%
Republican	William D. Severn	22,281	6.08%
Republican	miscellaneous	227	0.07%
Total votes		306,136	100.00%

=== Democratic primary ===
==== Campaign ====
In the Democratic primary, several high-profile Democrats considered a run, including incumbent U. S. Congressmen Les AuCoin and Jim Weaver and Portland mayor Neil Goldschmidt, but ultimately opted not to challenge the incumbent Packwood. In October 1979, Ted Kulongoski, a labor lawyer and state senator from Junction City, became the first major candidate to declare his candidacy, claiming that Packwood was beholden to large corporate special interests. Kulongoski had the field to himself until March, when former two-term U. S. Congressman Charles O. Porter joined the race. Porter, a Eugene attorney, was a supporter of Edward Kennedy's bid for President and planned to campaign on a strong anti-war platform. Porter and Kulongski agreed on most major issues, clashing only on gun control and nationalization of energy resources, both of which Porter favored and Kulongoski opposed. Though the race was expected to be close, Kulongoski defeated Porter handily by a 5–2 margin.

==== Results ====
Democratic primary for the United States Senate from Oregon, 1980
Party	Candidate	Votes	%
Democratic	Ted Kulongoski	161,153	47.66%
Democratic	Charles O. Porter	69,646	20.60%
Democratic	Jack Sumner	46,107	13.64%
Democratic	John Sweeney	39,961	11.82%
Democratic	Gene Arvidson	20,548	6.08%
Democratic	miscellaneous	692	0.21%
Total votes		338,110	100.00%

== General election ==
In addition to the candidates chosen in the primaries, Tonie Nathan was chosen as the Libertarian Party candidate at that party's convention in June. Previously, Nathan had been the Libertarian vice presidential candidate in the 1972 presidential election, and was the first woman to ever receive an electoral vote in a U.S. presidential election from a faithless elector who voted for her.

=== Campaign ===
As a well-funded incumbent, Packwood was expected to have a fairly easy road to re-election and led by double digit margins in most early polls. Packwood chose defense spending as his key issue in the campaign while Kulongoski focused on the economy and unemployment. Nathan hammered at core Libertarian principles of limited government, with a goal of 5% of votes which would keep the party as a valid minor party. The three candidates agreed to three debates, to be held across the state in the summer of 1980. As the challenger, Kulongoski aggressively attempted to engage Packwood in the debates, but the debate format did not allow the candidates to ask follow-up questions or rebut each other's statements and Packwood was largely able to avoid confrontation and stay above the fray. As the campaign wore on, Kulongoski grew more confident and tried to appeal to Oregonians' independent values by saying that Packwood's enormous cash advantage was due to "eastern" money.

Kulongoski closed to within a few points in some late polls, but with no mistakes made by Packwood and with the coattail effect of Ronald Reagan's Presidential victory, the incumbent achieved an electoral majority and a fairly comfortable 8-point margin over Kulongoski. Nathan finished with less than 4% of the vote, short of her goal of 5%. With Republicans taking control of the U.S. Senate, Packwood was in line to become chairman of the Senate Commerce Committee. Fellow Oregon Republican Senator Mark Hatfield was also elevated to chairman of the Senate Appropriations Committee, giving Oregon power in the Senate it had never seen before.

=== Results ===
United States Senate election in Oregon, 1980
Party	Candidate	Votes	%
Republican	Bob Packwood (incumbent)	594,290	52.13%
Democratic	Ted Kulongoski	501,963	44.03%
Libertarian	Tonie Nathan	43,686	3.83%
Total votes		1,139,939	100.00%
Republican hold			

== Aftermath ==
Packwood served as chairman of the Senate Commerce Committee until his appointment to chair the Finance Committee in 1985. He was re-elected to two more terms, in 1986 and 1992. Shortly after the 1992 election, allegations of sexual harassment revealed by The Washington Post led to his eventual resignation from the Senate in 1995.

Following his unexpectedly good showing in this race, Kulongoski was the Democratic nominee for governor in 1982, but lost badly to Republican incumbent Victor G. Atiyeh. In 1987, he was appointed state insurance commissioner by Governor Neil Goldschmidt. In 1992, he was elected Oregon Attorney General. In 1996, he was elected to the Oregon Supreme Court. In 2002, 20 years after his initial gubernatorial attempt, Kulongoski was elected as Oregon's 36th governor, and was re-elected in 2006.

Nathan ran unsuccessfully for U.S. Congress against Peter DeFazio in 1986 and 1990.

== See also ==
- 1980 United States Senate elections
