= Pete Sorenson =

American politician

Member of the Board of Commissioners of Lane County, Oregon
- In office 1997–2021
- Preceded by: Jerry Rust
- Succeeded by: Laurie Trieger
- Constituency: South Eugene

Member of the Oregon Senate from the 20th district
- In office 1993–1997
- Preceded by: Grattan Kerans
- Succeeded by: Susan Castillo

Personal details
- Born: 1951 (age 74–75) Washoe County, Nevada, U.S.
- Party: Democratic
- Spouse: Kim Leval
- Profession: Lawyer

Pete Sorenson (born 1951) in Washoe County, Nevada is a lawyer practicing Freedom of Information Act (FOIA) law and a former elected official from Lane County, Oregon. He has brought Freedom of Information Act cases in the United States District Court for the District of Columbia against many different federal agencies including the Centers for Medicare and Medicaid Services and Immigration and Customs Enforcement. In his time practicing FOIA law he has secured the release of over a million records.

From 1977 to 1979, Sorenson served as a special assistant to the Secretary of Agriculture during the Carter Administration. While in private law practice from 1982 to 1995, Sorenson also served as a member of the board of education at Lane Community College in Eugene Oregon. During his tenure at Lane Community College, Sorenson advocated strongly for dislocated workers' retraining programs and for childcare for staff and students.

In 1993, Sorenson was appointed to the Oregon State Senate, and was elected to a full senate term in 1994. He was elected assistant minority leader during the 1995 session. Pete is a progressive member of the Democratic Party who ran on a "pro-environment, pro-education, pro-senior, pro-regular taxpayer, pro-child, pro-civil rights, pro-civil liberties, and pro-people" platform.

Because Oregon term limits at that time prevented Sorenson from running for reelection as a state senator, he ran for county commissioner in 1996 and was elected to his first term. He ran successfully for reelection as a county commissioner in 2000, 2004 and 2008; in 2008 he ran unopposed. In 2009 he was elected by the four other commissioners as chair of the board of commissioners, a position he has held before.

In January 2005, Sorenson announced he would challenge incumbent governor Ted Kulongoski, also a Democrat. Sorenson was defeated in the May 2006 Democratic primary for governor, receiving 16.27% of the vote.

In July 2007, Pete Sorenson and Kim Leval were married. Kim was the executive director for the Northwest Center for Alternatives to Pesticides for nine years before becoming a legal assistant at the Sorenson Law Office. She is also a writer. Sorenson has two children: Jennifer, a child welfare worker for the State of Oregon, and Erik, who is a partner at Veracity Commercial Partners in San Francisco, California.

== See also ==
- Oregon gubernatorial election, 2006
- U.S. gubernatorial elections, 2006
