= Hardy Myers =

American lawyer

15th Attorney General of Oregon
- In office January 24, 1997 – January 4, 2009
- Governor: John Kitzhaber; Ted Kulongoski
- Preceded by: Ted Kulongoski
- Succeeded by: John Kroger

55th Speaker of the Oregon House of Representatives
- In office 1979–1983
- Preceded by: Philip D. Lang
- Succeeded by: Grattan Kerans
- Constituency: Multnomah County

Personal details
- Born: October 25, 1939 Electric Mills, Mississippi, U.S.
- Died: November 29, 2016 (aged 77) Portland, Oregon, U.S.
- Party: Democratic
- Spouse: Mary Ann
- Profession: Attorney

Hardy Myers (October 25, 1939 – November 29, 2016) was an American lawyer and Democratic politician who served three terms as the 15th attorney general of the state of Oregon, United States. Prior to taking office in 1997, he served from 1975 to 1985 in the Oregon House of Representatives, the last four of those years as its speaker, and was also a Metro councilor and chaired the Oregon Criminal Justice Council.

== Early life and education ==
Myers was born October 25, 1939, in Electric Mills, Mississippi. He moved with his family to Bend in central Oregon in 1943 where his father, a lumberman, became manager of the Shevlin-Hixon Lumber Company, one of the two large mills that used to operate on the Deschutes River. His family then moved to Prineville in 1951. He attended public schools until graduation from high school.

After high school, he attended the University of Mississippi, where he received his undergraduate degree with distinction in 1961.

Myers returned to Oregon to continue on to law school at the University of Oregon School of Law in Eugene, earning a LL.B. in 1964. While at the University of Oregon he became Phi Eta Sigma (freshman scholastic honorary), Phi Kappi Phi (undergraduate scholastic honorary), Omicron Delta Kappa (undergraduate leadership honorary). He was also on the Board of Editors of the Oregon Law Review.

== Law career ==
Myers clerked for a year to United States District Judge William G. East in 1964–65. During that time, East made national headlines for ordering U.S. Attorney General Robert F. Kennedy to show why an Oregon lawyer should not be paid for defending a criminal defendant he had been ordered to defend by the federal court. In what Time magazine said was "may be the neatest constitutional argument of the year", East justified the expenditure under the Takings Clause of the Fifth Amendment to the United States Constitution.

Myers was an attorney with Stoel Rives – Oregon's largest private law firm – in Portland for 31 years. He first came to the firm in 1965, when it was known Davies, Biggs, Strayer, Stoel and Boley. At Stoel Rives, his practice specialties were labor and employment law, and government affairs law.

He was a member of the Oregon State Bar and Multnomah County Bar Association and was admitted to practice before the United States District Court for the District of Oregon and United States Court of Appeals for the Ninth Circuit.

== Political career ==
Myers' public career began as president of the Portland City Planning Commission, where he served from 1973 to 1974.

=== State legislator ===
He first ran for, and was elected to, the Oregon House of Representatives in the 1974 elections representing what was then House District 19 (parts of NE and SE Portland). He served as in the House until 1985. In that time he was rated most outstanding member of Oregon Legislature in The Oregonian 1979 and 1981 surveys of legislative observers (no 1983 survey); rated most outstanding metro area State Representative in Willamette Week surveys of legislative observers in 1977, 1979, 1981 and 1983. Myers twice served as chair for the Committee on Judiciary, first from 1977 to 1978 and once again from 1983 to 1984.

=== Speaker of the House ===
He became speaker of the house in 1979. As speaker of the Oregon House in 1981, he spearheaded the effort for a state takeover of trial-court operations in all of the state's counties starting in 1983.

=== Post-legislator activities ===
He left elected office for a time in 1985 and was elected Councilor to the Metropolitan Service District (now Metro), serving from 1985 to 1986.

Chair, Citizens' Task Force on Mass Transit Policy, 1985–86 (appointed by TriMet Board of Directors).

Chair, Oregon Jail Project, 1984–86 (appointed by Association of Oregon Counties).

He went on to become chairman of the Oregon Criminal Justice Council in 1987 and was appointed to the State Sentencing Guidelines Board by then Governor Neil Goldschmidt. In that capacity he led the effort in 1989 to set state guidelines for felony sentencing. Those guidelines remain in effect, though voters set mandatory minimum prison sentences for some violent crimes through Measure 11 in 1994.

Chair, Portland Future Focus (city strategic planning process), 1990–91 (appointed by Mayor Bud Clark).

Myers appointed by Metropolitan Service District Executive Officer Rena Cusma to serve as chair of the Metro Charter Committee. This was a statutory committee which prepared the charter for the Portland metropolitan area regional government for the 1992 ballot. The charter was subsequently approved by the voters in the November general elections.

Chair, Governor's Task Force on State Employee Benefits, 1994 (appointed by Governor Barbara Roberts).

Co-chair, Governor's Task Force on State Employee Compensation, 1995 (appointed by Governor John Kitzhaber).

=== Attorney General ===
Prior to running for the state's Attorney General position in 1996, Myers had considered trying for the position for some time but did not want to run against Dave Frohnmayer who held the position in the 1980s, or against fellow Democrat former neighbor Gov. Ted Kulongoski, who was elected to the AG office in 1992.

When Kulongoski ran in 1996 for the Oregon Supreme Court, Myers "it was now or never." if he wanted to run for the position. Myers defeated Kevin Mannix of Salem in the 1996 primary, when Mannix was a Democrat.

Unlike counterparts in other states such as California and New York, the attorney general in Oregon can initiate some prosecutions, notably in election-law violations, organized crime and public corruption. But district attorneys in Oregon's 36 counties prosecute most crimes, although the attorney general provides help – especially in death-penalty cases – and defends convictions in the appellate courts.

Myers had been vigorous in efforts against sexual assault – largely by promoting improved training for police, prosecutors and professionals who treat medical and psychological effects – and for improved restitution for crime victims generally.

Although Myers was not among the half dozen attorneys general negotiating directly with tobacco industry – Washington state's Christine Gregoire, now governor, was one of them – Oregon received a larger share of the 1998 national tobacco settlement than most other states as a result of the amount of legal work it had done to advance the case. Myers believes one of the most important points in the settlement had nothing to do with the $246 billion payout that tobacco companies will make to the states during 25 years. It has to do with new restrictions on the marketing of tobacco to teenagers, who are most likely to continue smoking if they start when they are young.

In 2000, he ran for a third term, once again against facing Mannix who had by that time became a Republican. Myers went on beat Mannix in the November general election. While Mannix ran a fairly strong campaign, he was hurt by the presence on the ballot of Libertarian Tom Cox, who drew nearly 58,000 votes – more than Myers' margin of victory.

Myers drew headlines in 2001 when Oregon went to federal court to defend the Oregon Death with Dignity Act, the state's physician-assisted suicide law, against John Ashcroft who was then United States Attorney General, who opened the way for federal prosecution of doctors who prescribed lethal doses of medication. Oregon won at all levels, including the U.S. Supreme Court when the case Gonzales v. Oregon was heard in 2006 and was won in a 6–3 decision.

During Myers' tenure, Oregon has won five of six cases before the nation's highest court; one other, involving a Marion County case, is pending.

Under Myers, Oregon has been a leader in a series of multistate lawsuits against and settlements with big drug manufacturers in the past five years, as recently as October 22, 2008. Some of the cases involved companies such as Eli Lilly and Company, Merck, Pfizer and Purdue Pharma and garnered settlements of millions of dollars, some of which came back to Oregon to enable the state Department of Justice to pursue future investigations and enforce consumer-protection laws.

In late 2007, the Recording Industry Association of America subpoenaed the University of Oregon, asking it to identify students who, it alleged, had illegally shared copyrighted music. The university, represented by Myers, refused to provide the information, questioning the tactics used in the investigation.

In early January 2008, Myers and Gov. Kulongoski announced that Oregon along with 14 other states are joining California in a lawsuit against the Environmental Protection Agency (EPA) to uphold the right of states to regulate greenhouse gas pollution from automobiles. The lawsuit is in response to the EPA's denial of California's request for a waiver to set stricter tailpipe emissions standards than those set by the federal government, preventing California, Oregon, and other states from implementing stricter greenhouse gas emissions standards for cars.

In August 2007, Myers announced that he would not seek reelection in 2008.

His third and final term as Attorney General ended on January 4, 2009. His 12-year tenure as Oregon Attorney General ties him for third with Andrew Crawford among the 15 who have held that office. Only Isaac Homer Van Winkle (23 years, two months) and Robert Y. Thornton (16 years, five months) have served longer.

== Association and awards ==
As Attorney General, Myers served as:

- Conference of Western Attorneys General – chair
- Antitrust Committee – chair
- Consumer Protection Committee of the National Association of Attorneys General
- NAAG Executive Committee – member
- Attorney General's Sexual Assault Task Force – chair
- Restitution Reform Task Force – chair
- Governor's Council on Domestic Violence – former member

Myers has received the highest honors from his peers at the National Association of Attorneys General and the Oregon State Bar.

His public service awards as Attorney General include:

- Meritorious Service Award of the University of Oregon School of Law
- David Frohnmayer Award for Public Service presented by the University of Oregon School of Law Alumni Association
- Government Lawyer of the Year Award
- Professionalism Award of the Marion County (Oregon) Bar Association
- Community Support Hall of Fame Award of the Mid-Valley Women's Crisis Center
- Mary Oberst Award for Leadership to Prevent Childhood Drinking presented by Oregon Partnership.

== Electoral history ==
=== Attorney General ===
- 1996
  - Hardy Myers (D), 52%
  - Victor Hoffer (R), 41%
- 2000
  - Hardy Myers (D) (inc.), 50%
  - Kevin Mannix (R), 46%
- 2004
  - Hardy Myers (D) (inc.), 55%
  - Paul Connolly (R), 40%

== Personal life ==
Myers married Mary Ann Thalhofer of Prineville in 1962. They had three sons, Hardy III, Christopher and Jonathan. They lived in the Laurelhurst neighborhood of Portland from 1968 to 2016.

He died of complications of pneumonia in Portland on November 29, 2016. He also had lung cancer for the final two years of his life.

== See also ==
- List of Oregon Legislative Assemblies

Legal offices
Preceded by Ted Kulongoski	Oregon Attorney General; 1997–2009	Succeeded by John Kroger
