= Lesley-Ann L. Dupigny-Giroux =

Climatologist

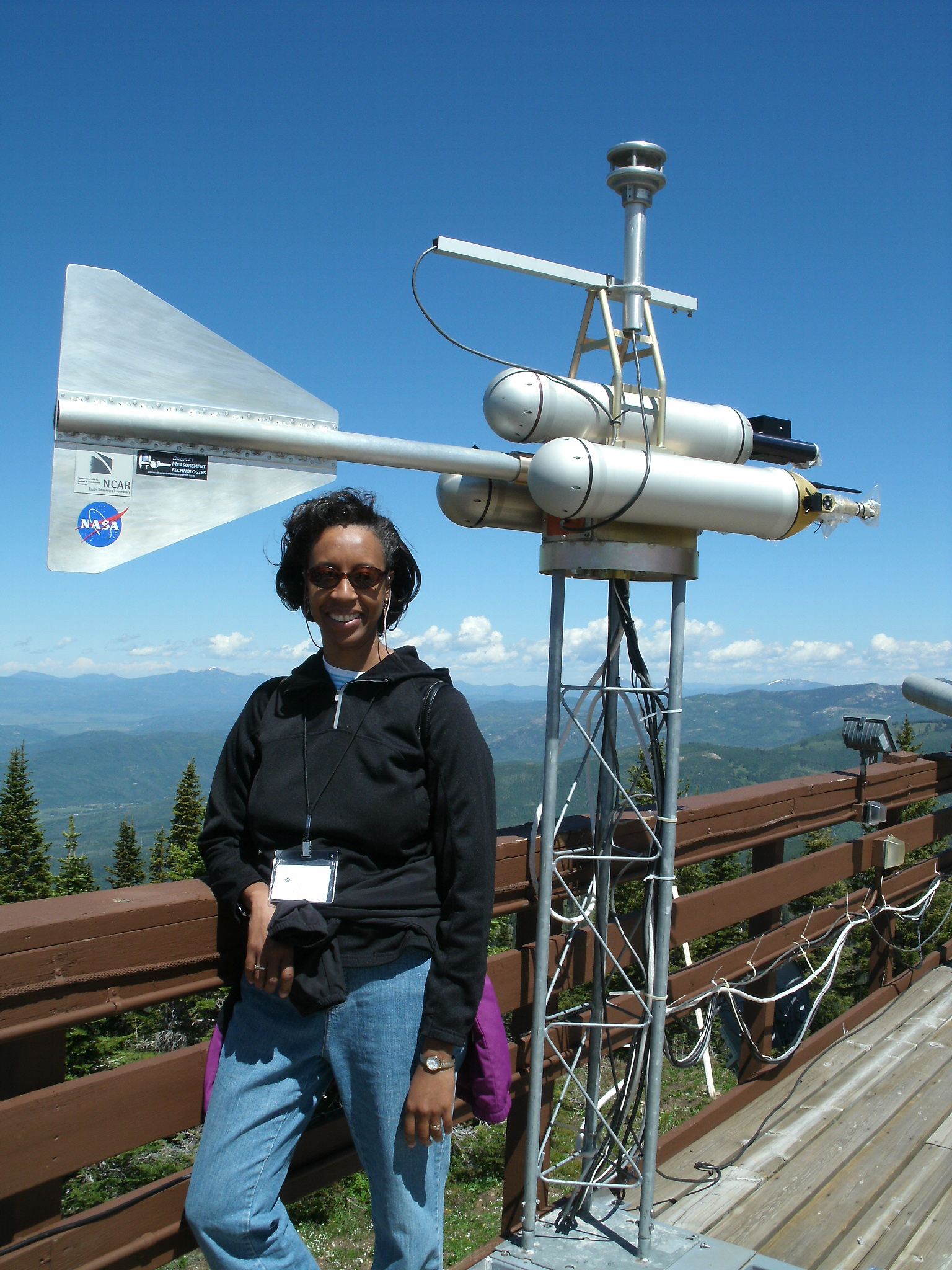
- Lesley-Ann L. Dupigny-Giroux standing in front of a NASA weather station
- Education: McGill University; University of Toronto
- Scientific career
- Fields: Climatology, Hydrology, Remote Sensing, Climate Literacy
- Workplaces: Vermont State Climatologist; University of Vermont
- Theses: Techniques for rainfall estimation and surface characterization over northern Brazil (1996); An analysis of the Temporal and Spatial Variability of the Rainfall and Runoff Regimes of Drainage Basins in Trinidad (1992)

Lesley-Ann L. Dupigny-Giroux is the Vermont State Climatologist, president of the American Association of State Climatologists, Inc., and a professor of Geography at the University of Vermont.

== Early life and education ==
Dupigny-Giroux was born in Trinidad and Tobago. Her exploration of the small island gave her an early appreciation for place and geography, and their connections to history.

Dupigny-Giroux earned her Bachelor of Science degree from the University of Toronto in 1989, double majoring in physical geography and development studies. She earned both her Master of Science (1992) and Doctor of Philosophy (1996) degrees from McGill University. Her Master's degree was in climatology and hydrology, with a thesis on rainfall and runoff in drainage basins in Trinidad. Her doctoral degree was in climatology and geographic information systems (GIS), with a thesis on drought and rainfall over northern Brazil. Early in her graduate studies, Dupigny-Giroux spent a summer at the National Center for Atmospheric Research (1990) analyzing rainfall and runoff data using spectral analysis methods with Warren Washington and Harry van Loon and later (1992) participated in the National Oceanic and Atmospheric Administration (NOAA) colloquium on operational and environmental prediction, where she learned techniques in climate monitoring, weathering analysis, and hydrologic and oceanographic prediction.

Dupigny-Giroux worked as a research assistant and lecturer while at McGill University and taught at the Southern Illinois University at Edwardsville as an assistant professor (1996-1997) before joining the University of Vermont and becoming Vermont State Climatologist in 1997.

== Research career ==
Dupigny-Giroux has served as Vermont State Climatologist and worked at the University of Vermont since 1997. She has authored more than 40 peer-reviewed publications and reports on hydrology, remote sensing, climate change and variability, extreme weather, and climate literacy.

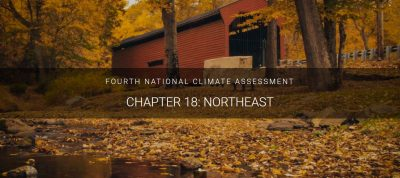
Chapter cover of the U.S. Global Change Research Program's fourth National Climate Assessment, Northeast Chapter (2018)

Notable publications include work with the US Global Change Research Program, where Dupigny-Giroux served as contributing author on Climate Change in the Northeast: A Sourcebook, a technical input for the Northeast chapter of the third National Climate Assessment (NCA3), and as chapter lead of the Northeast chapter of the fourth National Climate Assessment (NCA4). The Northeast chapter of NCA4 included information on how climate change would affect rural economies, natural resources, and human health in the Northeast United States. She also served as lead editor of the book Historical climate variability and impacts in North America, which uses instrumental and historical data to reconstruct and analyze climate change in North America between the 17th and 19th centuries.

Dupigny-Giroux has also conducted research on North Atlantic Ocean tropical cyclones, including disaster mitigation research to reduce wind damage to residential infrastructure and construction in the Caribbean.

=== University of Vermont ===
At the University of Vermont, Dupigny-Giroux served as an Assistant Professor from 1997 - 2003, Associate Professor from 2003 - 2014, Chair of the Department of Geography from 2015 - 2018, and Professor beginning in 2014, with secondary appointments in Department of Geology, the College of Education & Social Services, and Rubenstein School of Environment & Natural Resources. She teaches courses in meteorology, climatology, physical geography, remote sensing, and land-surface processes.

=== Vermont State Climatologist ===
In her work as State Climatologist for Vermont, Dupigny-Giroux uses her expertise hydrology and extreme weather, such as floods, droughts, and storms, to keep the residents of Vermont informed on how climate change will affect their homes, health, and livelihoods. She assists other state agencies in preparing for and adapting to current and future impacts of climate change on Vermont's transportation system, emergency management planning, and agriculture and forestry industries. For example, she has published analyses of the impacts of climate change on the health of Vermont's sugar maples, a hardwood species of key economic and cultural importance to the state. As co-chair of Vermont's State’s Drought Task Force, she played a key role in developing the 2018 Vermont State Hazard Mitigation Plan.

Dupigny-Giroux served as Secretary for the American Association of State Climatologists from 2010-2011 and President Elect from 2019-2020. In June 2020, she was elected as President of the American Association of State Climatologists, which is a two-year term.

== Climate literacy ==
In addition to her research on climate change, Dupigny-Giroux is known for her efforts to research and promote climate literacy. Climate literacy is an understanding of the influences of and influences on the climate system, including how people change the climate, how climate metrics are observed and modelled, and how climate change affects society. “Being climate literate is more critical than ever before,” Lesley-Ann Dupigny-Giroux stated for a 2020 article on climate literacy. “If we do not understand weather, climate and climate change as intricate and interconnected systems, then our appreciation of the big picture is lost.”

Dupigny-Giroux is known for her climate literacy work with elementary and high school teachers and students. She co-founded the Satellites Weather and Climate (SWAC) project in 2008, which is a professional development program for K-12 teachers designed to promote climate literacy and interest in the STEM (Science, Technology, Engineering and Mathematics) careers. Dupigny-Giroux is also a founding member of the Climate Literacy and Energy Awareness Network (CLEAN; formerly Climate Literacy Network), a community-based effort to support climate literacy and communication.

In a 2016 interview, Dupigny-Giroux stated: “Sharing knowledge and giving back to my community are my two axioms in life. Watching students mature and flourish in their four years with us is a great privilege and the best part about being a teacher-scholar here at UVM [University of Vermont].”

== Diversity in climate sciences ==
Lesley-Ann Dupigny-Giroux is the co-founder of the Diversity Climate Network (D-ClimNet), which was funded by a National Science Foundation (NSF) award (2009-2013) to enhance diversity, equity, and inclusion in the field of climatology. The Diversity Climate Network aims to train the next generation of racially and gender diverse scientists by providing mentoring and networking opportunities to high school students interested in climate science or geoscience. In 2010, Dupigny-Giroux was the Franklin Visiting Scholar for Inclusion and Diversity Leadership at the University of Georgia.

== Awards and recognition ==
- Fellow - University of Vermont Gund Institute for Environment (2020)
- University of Vermont, College of Arts & Sciences Scholar Teacher Award (2020) given to faculty who have consistently demonstrated the ability to translate their professional knowledge and skill into exciting classroom experiences for their students and who meet the challenge of being both excellent teachers and highly respected professionals in their own discipline
- Fellow - American Meteorological Society (2020)
- Association of Women Geoscientists (AWG) Professional Excellence Award for distinguished contributions in her profession (2018)
- International Joint Commission, Lake Champlain-Richelieu River Study Board, US Chair, Public Advisory Board (2016-2017)
- Fellow - Vermont Academy of Science and Engineering (2015)
- Goddard College scholar of residence (2015)
- Fellow - American Association of University Women (AAUW) Educational Foundation Shirley Farr (2003)
- American Association for the Advancement of Science (AAAS) Women's International Science Collaboration (WISC) Program (2002)
