= Jason Atkinson =

American politician (born 1970)

Jason A. Atkinson

Member of the Oregon Senate from the 2nd district
- In office January 2001 – January 2013
- Preceded by: Brady L. Adams
- Succeeded by: Herman Baertschiger

Member of the Oregon House of Representatives from the 51st district
- In office January 1999 – January 2001
- Preceded by: Eldon Johnson
- Succeeded by: Cherryl Walker

Personal details
- Born: November 6, 1970 (age 55) Sacramento, California, U.S.
- Party: Republican
- Spouse: Stephanie Atkinson
- Education: Southern Oregon University; Willamette University

Jason Atkinson (born November 6, 1970) is an American politician in the US state of Oregon. A member of the Republican party, Atkinson served as a senator in the Oregon State Senate from 2001 until 2013. He ran unsuccessfully for the Republican nomination for Governor of Oregon in 2006. He stated his intention to run in the 2010 Oregon gubernatorial election, but withdrew from the race in 2009.

He unsuccessfully ran for Congress in Oregon's 2nd congressional district in 2020.

== Early life ==
Born in Sacramento, California, Atkinson grew up in the Southern Oregon city of Ashland.

== Political career ==
In 1998, Atkinson was elected to his first public office as a member of the Oregon House of Representatives. He served as a Republican representing District 51, which includes Jackson and Josephine counties. He served one term before election to the Oregon State Senate in 2000. Atkinson was elected from District 25, once again representing Jackson and Josephine counties in Southern Oregon. In 2002, the district was changed to District 2. Atkinson was re-elected to a second four-year Oregon Senate term without opposition in 2004. In the State Senate he has served as Deputy Majority Leader, Majority Whip and Committee Chair.

In 2006, Atkinson ran for the Republican nomination for Governor of Oregon. He finished third of the eight candidates, with 22% of the vote, behind the nominee, Ron Saxton, who garnered 43% and Kevin Mannix, who received 30%.

Atkinson won reelection to the Oregon Senate in 2008. He did not run for reelection in 2012. He was a candidate for Congress in 2020.

== Personal life ==
Atkinson and his wife Stephanie live in Central Point with their son, Perry. The Atkinsons are of the Presbyterian faith.

He is the Secretary/Treasurer of KDSO-LD, a local religious television station. His father Perry is president and host of its major programs.

=== Gun accident ===
On July 29, 2008, while repairing a friend's bicycle, Atkinson was struck in the knee by a bullet fired from a loaded .38 caliber derringer pistol, which was in a small bag that he had taken off the bike and dropped on the floor. On July 31, Senator Atkinson was listed in serious condition at Providence Medford Medical Center. On August 4, 2008, Atkinson underwent successful surgery at Providence Medford Medical Center.

== Klamath River project ==
Atkinson is also known for his public support of the Klamath Basin Restoration Agreement. Dams, agricultural runoff, and water diversions in the upper basin of the Klamath River have caused water quality issues, ongoing fish kills, and steep salmon population declines on the lower half of the river, with resulting conflict between salmon fishing communities including several Native American tribes on one side, and ranchers and farmers on the other. In response, commercial fishermen, environmental groups and tribes have proposed reductions in water use in the Klamath Basin, as well as the removal of at least four dams on the river to recover blocked fish habitat and reduce water quality problems. In early 2010, after a multi-year negotiation process, a group of Klamath stakeholders put forth their concerns in the Klamath Basin Restoration Agreement. This water management plan was signed by a number of local communities, governments, tribal groups, environmentalists, and fishermen, although it was also immediately opposed by some other local tribes and conservationists, as well as some farmers and ranchers. The proposal was endorsed by the U.S. Department of the Interior but was not authorized by the United States Congress. The Klamath Basin Restoration Agreement expired in late 2015, but in early 2016, a separate and more broadly-supported accord known as the Klamath Hydropower Settlement Agreement was struck. Unlike the prior settlement, this new agreement does not require support or funding from Congress, and is expected to lead to the removal of the four lower Klamath River dams in 2020.

Although Atkinson was not part of the negotiations or a signatory to the Klamath Basin Restoration Agreement, he pushed strongly for Congress to endorse it. In 2014, he produced and narrated a documentary film, A River Between Us, describing the controversy and the peoples involved. However, the plan was not endorsed before Congress adjourned at the end of 2015. Atkinson has stated his belief that members of Congress did not take the plan or the people seriously enough to realize the plan's importance to environmental restoration.

== Electoral history ==
Oregon State Senator 2nd District General Electoral Results
Year	Democrat	Votes	Pct	Republican	Votes	Pct
2008	Richard Koopmans	17,570	30.79%	Jason A. Atkinson	39,265	68.81%
2004	No candidate filed			Jason A. Atkinson	45,379	96.17%

Oregon State Senator 25th District General Electoral Results
Year	Democrat	Votes	Pct	Republican	Votes	Pct
2000	No candidate filed			Jason A. Atkinson	37,636	95.35%

Oregon State Representative 51st District General Electoral Results
Year	Democrat	Votes	Pct	Republican	Votes	Pct
1998	Lon Holston	7,088	40.54%	Jason A. Atkinson	10,380	59.37%

Oregon Gubernatorial Republican Primary Electoral Results
Year	Republican	Votes	Pct	Republican	Votes	Pct	Republican	Votes	Pct	Republican	Votes	Pct
2006	Ron Saxton	125,286	41.69	Kevin Mannix	89,553	29.80%	Jason A. Atkinson	67,057	22.31%	Other candidate	18,658	6.21%

== See also ==
- Oregon gubernatorial election, 2010
- Oregon legislative elections, 2008
- Oregon gubernatorial election, 2006
- Seventy-fifth Oregon Legislative Assembly
