= Lisa Naito (Oregon politician) =

American politician

Multnomah County Commissioner from the 3rd district
- In office December 1998 – December 2008
- Succeeded by: Judy Shiprack

Member of the Oregon House of Representatives from the 15th district
- In office January 14, 1991 – January 13, 1997
- Preceded by: Gene Sayler
- Succeeded by: Randall Edwards

Personal details
- Party: Democratic

Lisa H. Naito is an American politician from the state of Oregon. A Democrat, she has served as a state representative and as a Multnomah County commissioner.

== Biography ==
Naito was elected to the Oregon House of Representatives in 1990, serving three terms. In 1998, she was elected to the county commission and served for ten years. In between those offices she served on the Metro Council.

In March 2004, Naito, along with three other Multnomah county commissioners, approved plans to begin issuing marriage licenses to same-sex couples in Multnomah County; they issued over 3,000 licenses before the move was blocked by a judge the next month.

Naito formed Hooley & Naito, a strategic planning and legislative advocacy firm, with former Congresswoman Darlene Hooley after leaving office.

== Personal life ==
She is married to Steve Naito, the son of Bill Naito.
