= Bev Stein =

American politician

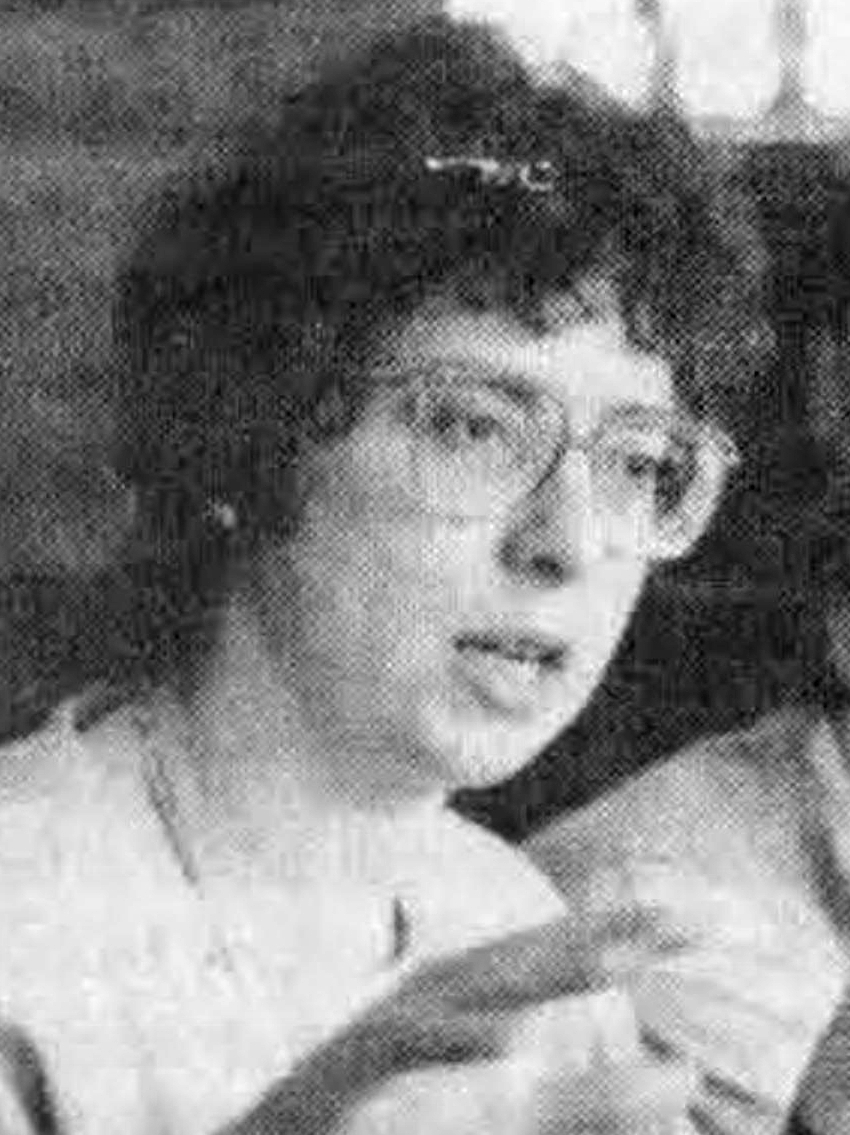
Stein c. 1988

Beverly "Bev" Stein is an activist, lawyer and politician from Oregon who served in various capacities in Portland, but who now lives in Tillamook.

== Biography ==
Stein attended the University of California, Berkeley and the University of Wisconsin Law School before moving to Portland, where she helped found the New American Movement's Portland chapter. She later joined the Democratic Socialists of America. She was elected in 1988 as a Democrat to represent the 14th district of the Oregon House of Representatives, succeeding fellow Democrat Shirley Gold, who was making a (successful) run for the Oregon State Senate. Stein would remain in that position until she resigned on April 21, 1993 to seek election as chair of the Multnomah County Board. She was succeeded by fellow Democrat George Eighmey.

Stein would win her race for board chair, and served eight years in that position. In 2002, she resigned to run for Governor of Oregon, losing in the Democratic primary election to eventual victor Ted Kulongoski. She is Jewish.

== Election results ==
Oregon gubernatorial Democratic primary election, 2002
Party	Candidate	Votes	%
Democratic	Ted Kulongoski	170,799	48.21
Democratic	Jim Hill	92,294	26.05
Democratic	Bev Stein	76,517	21.60
Democratic	William Peter Allen	6,582	1.86
Democratic	Caleb Burns	4,167	1.18
	write-ins	3,925	1.11
Total votes		354,284	100
