= Ted Kulongoski =

American judge and politician (born 1940)

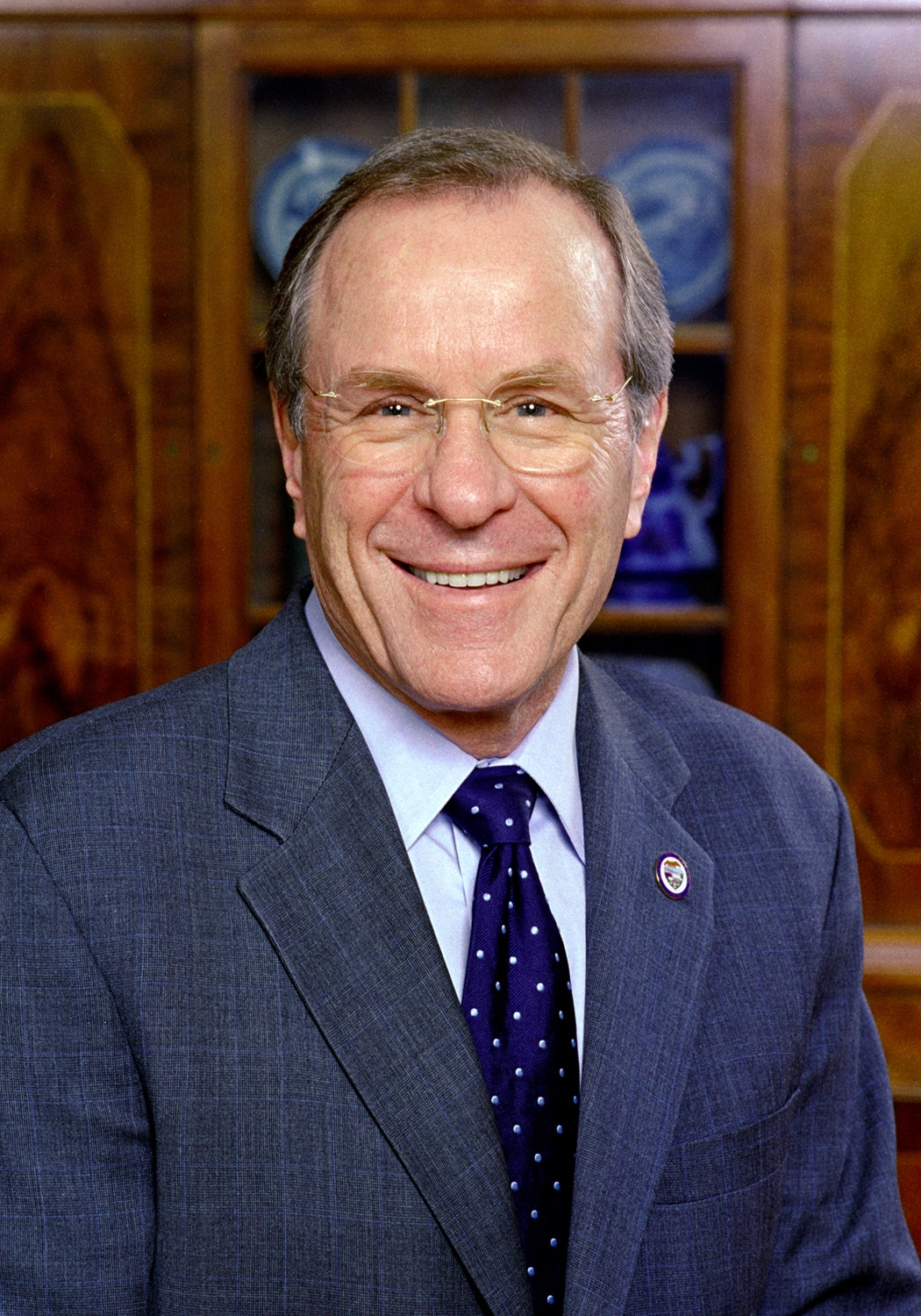
- Kulongoski in 2007

36th Governor of Oregon
- In office January 13, 2003 – January 10, 2011
- Preceded by: John Kitzhaber
- Succeeded by: John Kitzhaber

Justice of the Oregon Supreme Court
- In office January 4, 1997 – June 18, 2001
- Preceded by: Richard Unis
- Succeeded by: Thomas Balmer

14th Attorney General of Oregon
- In office January 4, 1993 – January 4, 1997
- Governor: Barbara Roberts; John Kitzhaber
- Preceded by: Charles Crookham
- Succeeded by: Hardy Myers

Member of the Oregon State Senate from the 22nd district
- In office August 2, 1977 – January 10, 1983
- Preceded by: Elizabeth Browne
- Succeeded by: William Frye

Member of the Oregon House of Representatives from the 43rd district
- In office January 13, 1975 – August 2, 1977
- Preceded by: David Stults
- Succeeded by: Clinton Boehringer

Personal details
- Born: Theodore Ralph Kulongoski; November 5, 1940 (age 85) St. Louis, Missouri, U.S.
- Party: Democratic
- Spouse: Mary Oberst
- Children: 3
- Education: University of Missouri (BA, JD)

Theodore Ralph Kulongoski (/ˌkʊlənˈɡɒski/ KUUL-ən-GOSS-kee; born November 5, 1940) is an American politician, judge, and lawyer who served as the 36th governor of Oregon from 2003 to 2011. A member of the Democratic Party, he served in both houses of the Oregon Legislative Assembly and also served as the state Insurance Commissioner. He was the Attorney General of Oregon from 1993 to 1997 and a justice of the Oregon Supreme Court from 1997 to 2001. Kulongoski has served in all three branches of the Oregon state government.

== Early life and education ==
Kulongoski was born in St. Louis, Missouri, in 1940 to Theodore Kulongoski (1905–1941), the son of Polish immigrants, and his wife Helen, née Newcomer (1915–1997). He was one year old when his father died of cancer, and spent the rest of his childhood in a Catholic boys' home. After high school, Kulongoski served in the Marines. With the help of the G.I. Bill, he obtained an undergraduate and Juris Doctor from the University of Missouri School of Law in 1970.

== Career ==
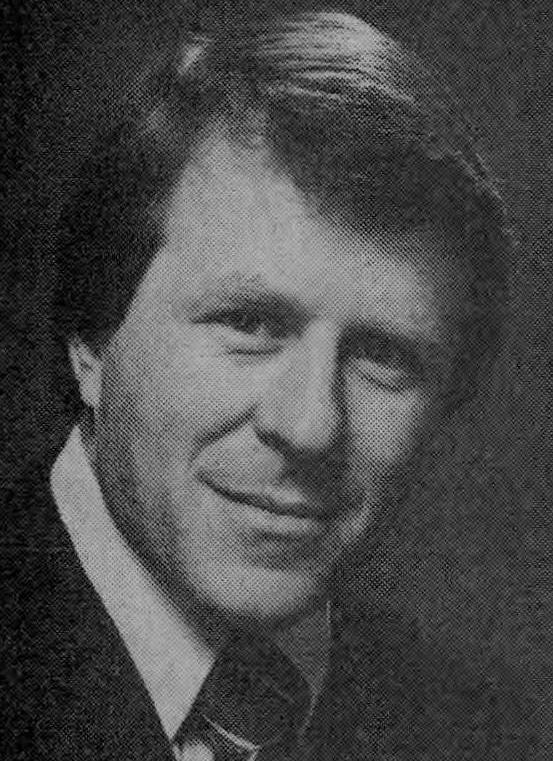
Ted Kulongoski in 1980

After graduating from law school, Kulongoski moved to Eugene, Oregon, and became a labor lawyer. In 1974, Kulongoski was elected to the Oregon House of Representatives and, in 1978, to the Oregon State Senate. In Oregon's 1980 United States Senate election, he ran an unsuccessful race against Republican Bob Packwood. In 1982, he made his first bid for governor; he was defeated by Republican incumbent Victor G. Atiyeh.

At the 1980 Democratic National Convention then-State Senator and U.S. Senate nominee Kulongoski received 8 (0.24%) delegate votes for Vice President of the United States. Kulongoski was not a candidate and incumbent Walter Mondale was easily renominated.

In 1987, Oregon Governor Neil Goldschmidt appointed Kulongoski to the post of state insurance commissioner. In that role, Kulongoski reformed the state's workers' compensation insurance system, a move that is widely credited for lowering costs to business.

=== 1992 and 1996 elections ===
In 1992, Kulongoski was elected as Oregon Attorney General, defeating Republican Rich Rodeman. As Attorney General, he focused on reforming the juvenile justice system. In 1996, Kulongoski decided against running for re-election as Attorney General, and instead successfully ran for the Oregon Supreme Court. He resigned from the court in 2001 to run for governor.

=== 2002 gubernatorial election ===
After winning the Democratic party nomination in the 2002 race for governor, Kulongoski's opponent was Republican Kevin Mannix. Kulongoski ran a low-key campaign, emphasizing his reputation as a consensus-builder and problem solver. His television commercials featured such feel-good scenes as the candidate bowling. He argued for a pragmatic approach to solving the state's budget crisis and recession, a marked departure from the more confrontational style of outgoing governor (and fellow Democrat) John Kitzhaber. Mannix argued that the Democratic Party had held the governorship in Oregon too long, and pledged to reduce government spending without cutting vital services. Kulongoski narrowly won the election, winning 618,004 votes (49%), with 581,785 votes (46%) going to Mannix, and 57,760 votes (5%) going to Libertarian candidate Tom Cox.

Kulongoski took office on January 13, 2003. He inherited a state facing a massive budget deficit and high unemployment. Furthermore, he faced the task of dealing with problems with the public employees' pension system without angering the labor unions that backed his campaign. As Governor, he was a member of the National Governors Association and the Democratic Governors Association.

=== 2006 gubernatorial election ===
On December 1, 2005, the Eugene Register-Guard reported that former Democratic Governor John Kitzhaber was considering challenging Kulongoski in the Democratic primary. One month later, Kitzhaber announced he would not do so, as did another potential Democratic rival, State Senator Vicki Walker. This left Kulongoski with two challengers: Lane County Commissioner Pete Sorenson, and former State treasurer Jim Hill, both of whom accused Kulongoski of betraying Democratic Party principles. Stated Hill, "From my standpoint, [the Democratic Party primary debate] is a good opportunity to show what a horrible Democrat Ted has been". The Service Employees International Union Local 503 endorsed Jim Hill, and the Multnomah County Democratic Central Committee decided to endorse Kulongoski's rivals but not him at a February 19, 2006 meeting.

On May 16, 2006, Kulongoski won the Democratic primary with 54% of the vote. Jim Hill finished second with 25%, Pete Sorenson third with 16% of the vote.

Kulongoski faced multiple opponents in the general election: Republican Party candidate Ron Saxton, Constitution Party candidate Mary Starrett, Libertarian Party candidate Richard Morley, and Pacific Green Party candidate Joe Keating. Former Republican Ben Westlund planned on running as independent, but on August 10, 2006, withdrew from the race, stating that "I made a commitment to the people of Oregon that I was in it to win it and that I absolutely would not play a spoiler role".

On November 7, 2006, Kulongoski won a second term, 51% to 43% over Ron Saxton.

=== Second term ===
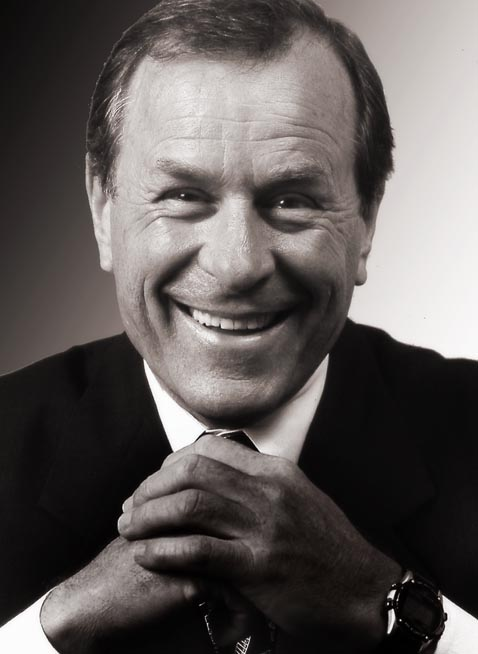
Ted Kulongoski in 2009

In February 2007, Kulongoski and State Senator Brad Avakian worked to clarify that Oregon recognizes no position of "state climatologist" in response to the use of that title by Oregon State University professor George H. Taylor, who believes that human activities are not the main cause of global climate change. Kulongoski said the state needs a consistent message on reducing greenhouse gases to combat climate change.

Beginning the week of April 24, 2007, Kulongoski gained national attention when he joined a campaign, known as the food stamp challenge, that portrays the difficulty living on the average weekly food stamp allotment of $21.

Kulongski announced May 8, 2007 that Oregon will join the Climate Registry to track dangerous greenhouse gas emissions.

Kulongoski signed two LGBT rights bills into law: a domestic partnership bill and an anti-discrimination bill at a ceremony May 9, 2007.

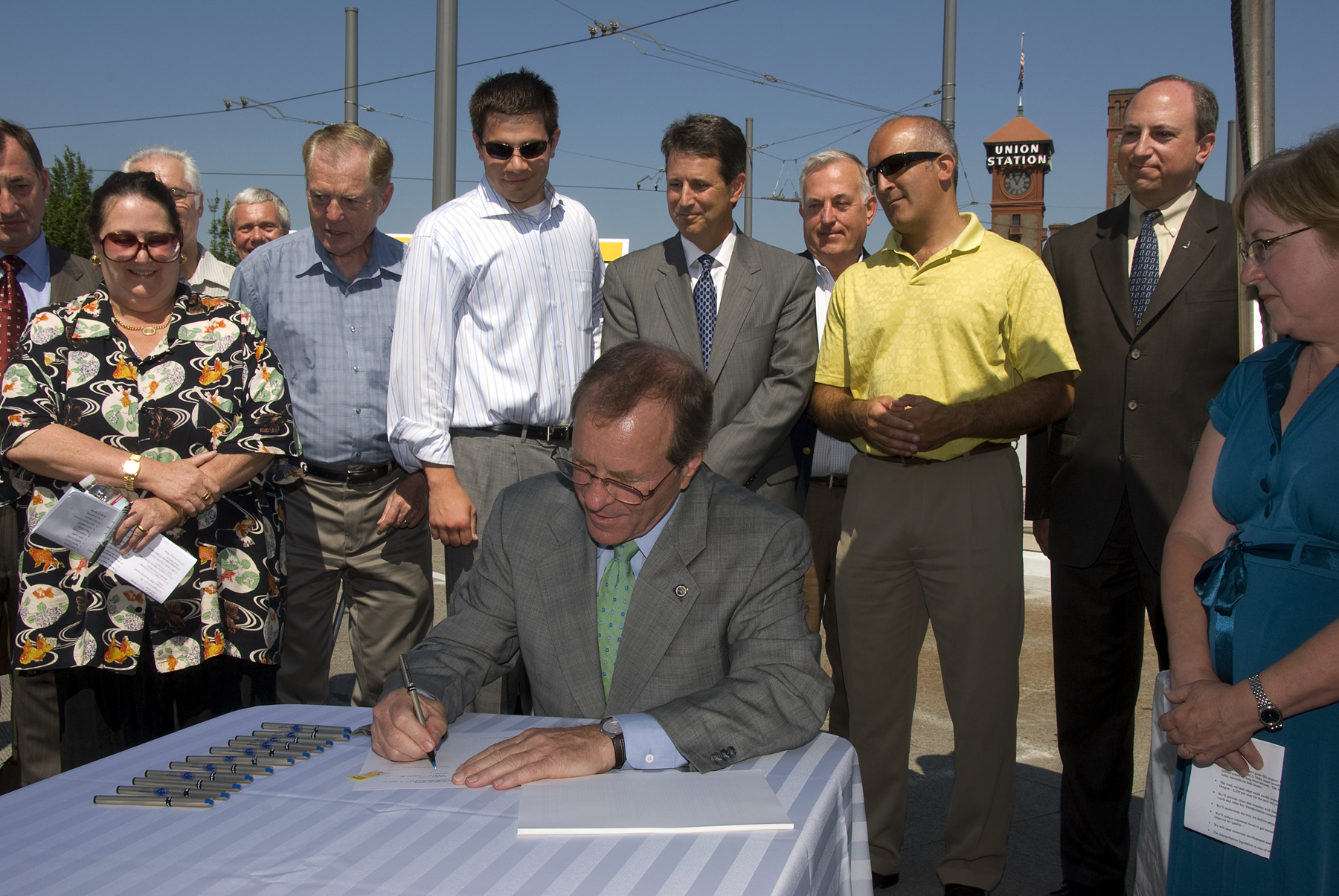
Kulongoski signing the Jobs and Transportation Act, 2009

In May 2010, Kulongoski suffered a vitreous hemorrhage in the eye due to fragile, abnormal blood vessels that have grown in the retina of the eye. According to Kulongoski spokeswoman Anna Richter Taylor, he was scheduled for outpatient surgery at Oregon Health & Science University on June 30, 2010, to surgically remove the vitreous gel from the middle of the eye so full vision can be restored.

=== Later life ===
After leaving the governor's office, he was appointed by John Kitzhaber to the Public Safety Commission as part of a review of Oregon's sentencing guidelines. In 2012, Kulongoski joined the faculty at Portland State University in the school's Mark O. Hatfield School of Government.

== Electoral history ==
Oregon gubernatorial election, 1982
Party	Candidate	Votes	%
Republican	Victor G. Atiyeh (incumbent)	639,841	61.41%
Democratic	Ted Kulongoski	374,316	35.92%
Libertarian	Paul Cleveland	27,394	2.63%
	Write-ins	458	0.3%
Total votes		1,042,009	100.00%
Republican hold			

Oregon gubernatorial Democratic primary election, 2002
Party	Candidate	Votes	%
Democratic	Ted Kulongoski	170,799	48.21
Democratic	Jim Hill	92,294	26.05
Democratic	Bev Stein	76,517	21.60
Democratic	William Peter Allen	6,582	1.86
Democratic	Caleb Burns	4,167	1.18
	write-ins	3,925	1.11
Total votes		354,284	100

Oregon gubernatorial general election, 2002
Party	Candidate	Votes	%
Democratic	Ted Kulongoski	618,004	49.03
Republican	Kevin Mannix	581,785	46.16
Libertarian	Tom Cox	57,760	4.58
	write-ins	2,948	0.23
Total votes		1,260,497	100

Oregon gubernatorial Democratic primary election, 2006
Party	Candidate	Votes	%
Democratic	Ted Kulongoski (Incumbent)	170,944	53.56
Democratic	Jim Hill	92,439	28.96
Democratic	Pete Sorenson	51,346	16.09
	write-ins	4,448	1.39
Total votes		319,177	100

Oregon gubernatorial general election, 2006
Party	Candidate	Votes	%
Democratic	Ted Kulongoski (Incumbent)	699,786	50.73
Republican	Ron Saxton	589,748	42.75
Constitution	Mary Starrett	50,229	3.64
Pacific Green	Joe Keating	20,030	1.45
Libertarian	Richard Morley	16,798	1.22
	write-ins	2,884	0.21
Total votes		1,379,475	100

Party political offices
Preceded by Betty Roberts	Democratic nominee for U.S. Senator from Oregon (Class 3); 1980	Succeeded by Jim Weaver
Preceded by Robert Straub	Democratic nominee for Governor of Oregon; 1982	Succeeded by Neil Goldschmidt
Preceded by John Kitzhaber	Democratic nominee for Governor of Oregon; 2002, 2006	Succeeded by John Kitzhaber
Legal offices
Preceded by Charles Crookham	Attorney General of Oregon; 1993–1997	Succeeded by Hardy Myers
Preceded by Richard Unis	Justice of the Oregon Supreme Court; 1997–2001	Succeeded by Thomas A. Balmer
Political offices
Preceded by John Kitzhaber	Governor of Oregon; 2003–2011	Succeeded by John Kitzhaber
U.S. order of precedence (ceremonial)
Preceded by John Kitzhaber as Former Governor	Order of precedence of the United States	Succeeded by Kate Brown as Former Governor
