= Alan C. Riebel =

American politician (1927-2023)

Member of the Oregon House of Representatives from the 31st district
- In office 1977–1983
- Preceded by: Norma Paulus
- Succeeded by: Jim Hill

Personal details
- Born: August 19, 1927 Grants Pass, Oregon, U.S.
- Died: March 6, 2023 (aged 95)
- Party: Republican

Alan C. Riebel (August 19, 1927 – March 6, 2023) was an American politician. He served as a Republican member for the 31st district of the Oregon House of Representatives.

== Life and career ==
Riebel was born in Grants Pass, Oregon. He was an insurance broker.

Riebel served in the Oregon House of Representatives from 1977 to 1983.

Riebel died on March 6, 2023, at the age of 95.
