= 2002 Oregon gubernatorial election =

- November 5, 2002
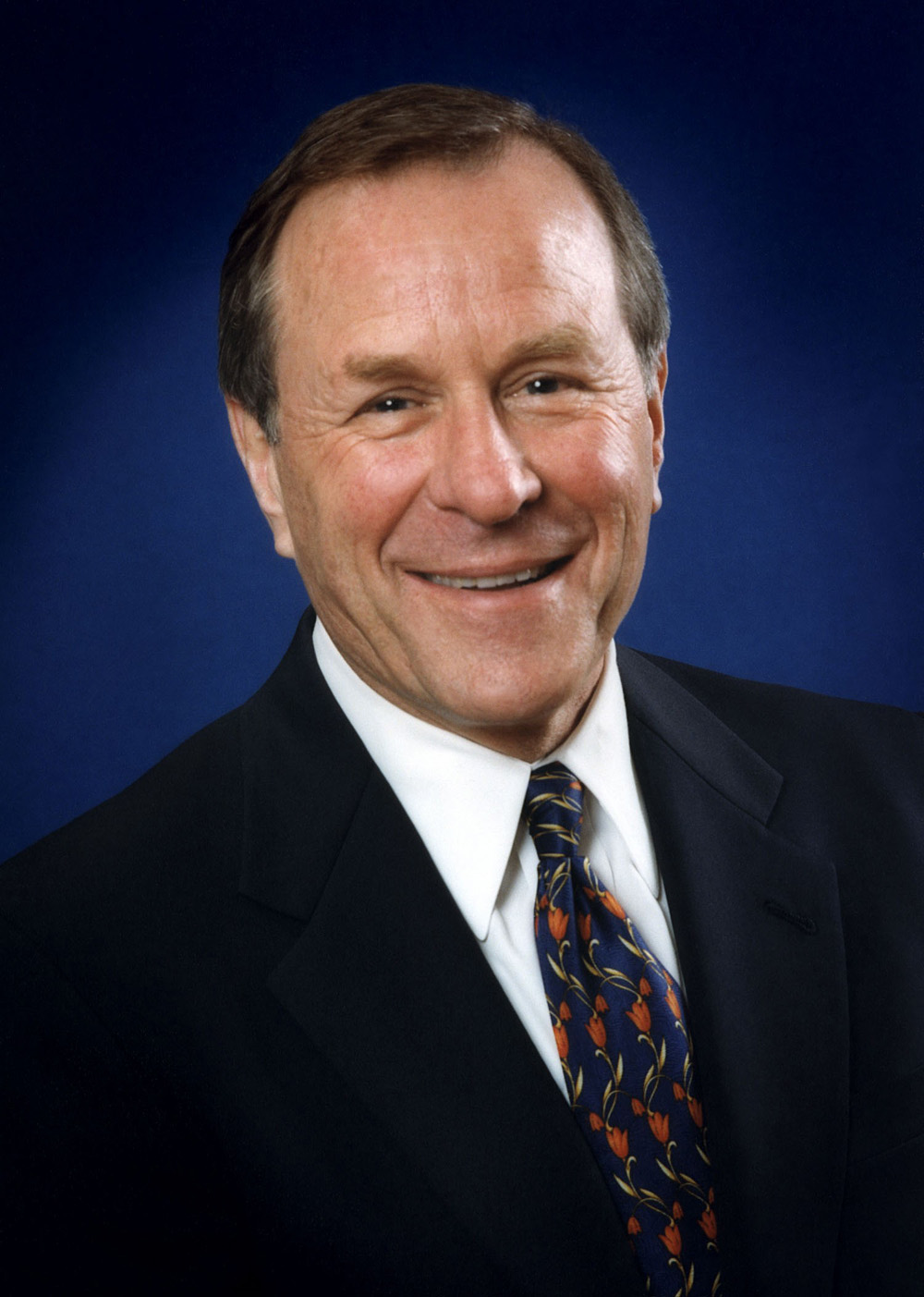

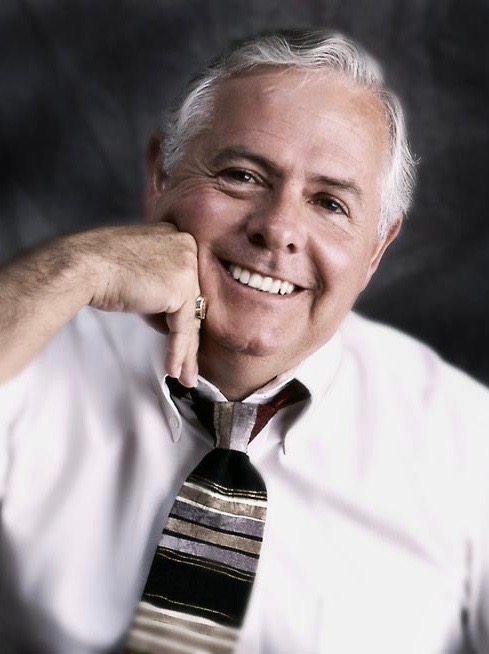
Nominee	Ted Kulongoski	Kevin Mannix
Party	Democratic	Republican
Popular vote	618,004	581,785
Percentage	49.03%	46.16%
- County results Kulongoski: 40–50% 50–60% 60–70% Mannix: 40–50% 50–60% 60–70% 70–80%
Governor before election
John Kitzhaber
Democratic
Elected Governor
Ted Kulongoski
Democratic

The 2002 Oregon gubernatorial election took place on November 5, 2002. Incumbent Democrat John Kitzhaber was barred by term limits from seeking a third consecutive term; he later successfully ran again in 2010 and 2014. To replace him, former Oregon Supreme Court Associate Justice Ted Kulongoski won a crowded and competitive Democratic primary, while former State Representative Kevin Mannix emerged from an equally competitive Republican primary. The campaign between Kulongoski and Mannix, who were joined by Libertarian nominee Tom Cox, was close and went down to the wire. Ultimately, Kulongoski eked out a narrow margin of victory over Mannix, which was slightly smaller than Cox's total vote share, allowing Kulongoski to win what would be the first of two terms as governor. As of 2024, this is the last time that Oregon voted for a gubernatorial nominee and a U.S. Senate nominee of different political parties.

== Democratic primary ==
=== Candidates ===
- William Peter Allen, engineering consultant
- Caleb Burns, clinical psychologist
- Jim Hill, former Oregon State Treasurer
- Ted Kulongoski, former Oregon Supreme Court Associate Justice, former Attorney General of Oregon, nominee for U.S. Senate in 1980, and nominee for governor in 1982
- Bev Stein, chair of the Multnomah County Commission

=== Campaign ===
Kulongoski obtained the endorsement of labor unions and the backing of governor Kitzhaber. A poll before the election showed Kulongoski at 40%, ahead of former State Treasurer Jim Hill at 23%, and Bev Stein at 19%. Lesser known candidates standing in the Democratic primary included William Allen, campaigning on the belief that Oregon paid too much money to the federal government and should consider seceding, and Caleb Burns standing to reform Oregon's schools.

=== Results ===
Results by county: Ted Kulongoski: 50–55% 45–50% 40–45% 35–40%

Democratic Primary results
Party	Candidate	Votes	%
Democratic	Ted Kulongoski	170,799	48.21%
Democratic	Jim Hill	92,294	26.05%
Democratic	Bev Stein	76,517	21.60%
Democratic	William Peter Allen	6,582	1.86%
Democratic	Caleb Burns	4,167	1.18%
Democratic	Scattering	3,925	1.11%
Total votes		354,284	100.00%

== Republican primary ==
=== Candidates ===
- W. Ames Curtright, retired teacher and businessman
- Kevin Mannix, former Oregon State Representative, 2000 Republican nominee for Attorney General of Oregon
- Jack Roberts, Oregon Commissioner of Labor and Industries
- Ron Saxton, former Chair of the Portland Public Schools Board
- Lee R. Shindler
- Robert Weidner, 1998 Constitution Party nominee for Governor of Oregon

=== Results ===
Results by county: Kevin Mannix: 45–50% 40–45% 35–40% 30–35%; Jack Roberts: 40–45% 35–40% 30–35%; Ron Saxton: 40–45% 35–40% 30–35%

Republican primary results
Party	Candidate	Votes	%
Republican	Kevin Mannix	117,194	35.24%
Republican	Jack Roberts	98,008	29.47%
Republican	Ron Saxton	93,484	28.11%
Republican	W. Ames Curtright	10,986	3.30%
Republican	Roger Weidner	7,395	2.22%
Republican	Lee R. Shindler	2,266	0.68%
Republican	Scattering	3,242	0.97%
Total votes		332,575	100.00%

== General election ==
=== Campaign ===
Kulongoski focused on education, his support for gay rights and the Oregon Death with Dignity law. Mannix campaigned on his plans to cut taxes to stimulate the economy of Oregon and encouraging partnerships between businesses and colleges. Tom Cox for the Libertarian party and two write in candidates, Richard Alevizos and Gary Spanovich, also stood in the election.

The departure of Kitzhaber, who had opposed plans to build a Columbia Gorge casino, was considered an opportunity for the Confederated Tribes of Warm Springs. Tribes invested record amounts of money into Oregon politics in this race, including $40,000 supporting Kulongoski. Kulongoski did not take a position on the issue during the campaign, but later became a supporter of the plan.

Kulongoski campaigned using a motor home and his many visits to bowling alleys became a trademark of his campaign. Early in the campaign Kulongoski held a large lead over Mannix in the polls but the gap narrowed as the election neared after Mannix put Kulongoski on the defensive. Mannix characterised Kulongoski as a strong tax and spender after he endorsed a proposed $313 million income tax rise to avoid cuts in education and other areas. He also attacked Kulongoski for being soft on crime. A poll in October showed Kulongoski at 45%, only 4 percent ahead of Mannix at 41%.

Mannix conceded the election on November 6, 2002 after Kulongoski secured a decisive lead in the vote count. Libertarian candidate Tom Cox claimed that he was responsible for Kulongoski's victory, as his exit polls suggested he took twice as many Republican votes as Democratic votes.

=== Predictions ===
Source	Ranking	As of
The Cook Political Report	Lean D	October 31, 2002
Sabato's Crystal Ball	Lean D	November 4, 2002

=== Results ===
2002 Oregon gubernatorial election
Party	Candidate	Votes	%	±%
Democratic	Ted Kulongoski	618,004	49.03%	−15.39%
Republican	Kevin Mannix	581,785	46.16%	+16.15%
Libertarian	Tom Cox	57,760	4.58%	+2.77%
Write-in	Scattering	2,948	0.23%	
Total votes		1,260,497	100.00%	
Majority		36,219	2.87%	−31.54%
Democratic hold		Swing	-31.54%	

=== Results by county ===
As of 2026, this is the most recent gubernatorial election in which Washington County has backed a Republican.

County	Ted Kulongoski Democratic		Kevin Mannix Republican		Tom Cox Libertarian		Scattering Write-in		Margin		Total votes cast
County	#	%	#	%	#	%	#	%	#	%	Total votes cast
Baker	2,335	32.39%	4,522	62.73%	341	4.73%	11	0.15%	-2,187	-30.34%	7,209
Benton	18,226	56.58%	12,769	39.64%	1,138	3.53%	81	0.25%	5,457	16.94%	32,214
Clackamas	60,840	45.93%	66,114	49.91%	5,439	4.11%	68	0.05%	-5,274	-3.98%	132,461
Clatsop	7,347	53.55%	5,606	40.86%	699	5.09%	68	0.50%	1,741	12.69%	13,720
Columbia	8,465	47.41%	8,000	44.81%	1,298	7.27%	92	0.52%	465	2.60%	17,855
Coos	10,968	44.05%	12,463	50.05%	1,395	5.60%	73	0.29%	-1,495	-6.00%	24,899
Crook	2,454	34.42%	4,175	58.56%	474	6.65%	27	0.38%	-1,721	-24.14%	7,130
Curry	3,816	40.29%	5,154	54.41%	479	5.06%	23	0.24%	-1,338	-14.13%	9,472
Deschutes	21,544	43.60%	25,189	50.98%	2,546	5.15%	129	0.26%	-3,645	-7.38%	49,408
Douglas	12,953	34.00%	22,934	60.20%	2,101	5.52%	106	0.28%	-9,981	-26.20%	38,094
Gilliam	410	41.37%	552	55.70%	29	2.93%	0	0.00%	-142	-14.33%	991
Grant	704	20.46%	2,615	76.00%	115	3.34%	7	0.20%	-1,911	-55.54%	3,441
Harney	777	26.14%	1,970	66.29%	214	7.20%	11	0.37%	-1,193	-40.14%	2,972
Hood River	3,658	52.53%	3,016	43.31%	276	3.96%	13	0.19%	642	9.22%	6,963
Jackson	31,850	44.72%	35,832	50.31%	3,404	4.78%	132	0.19%	-3,982	-5.59%	71,218
Jefferson	2,460	41.65%	3,096	52.42%	327	5.54%	23	0.39%	-636	-10.77%	5,906
Josephine	10,462	35.21%	17,462	58.77%	1,720	5.79%	67	0.23%	-7,000	-23.56%	29,711
Klamath	5,861	27.23%	14,627	67.96%	986	4.58%	50	0.23%	-8,766	-40.73%	21,524
Lake	768	24.83%	2,202	71.19%	111	3.59%	12	0.39%	-1,434	-46.36%	3,093
Lane	69,221	56.89%	46,859	38.51%	5,491	4.51%	108	0.09%	22,362	18.38%	121,679
Lincoln	9,602	53.10%	7,317	40.46%	1,113	6.15%	52	0.29%	2,285	12.64%	18,084
Linn	13,975	38.43%	20,420	56.15%	1,891	5.20%	83	0.23%	-6,445	-17.72%	36,369
Malheur	2,342	28.88%	5,572	68.71%	189	2.33%	6	0.07%	-3,230	-39.83%	8,109
Marion	41,332	43.05%	50,371	52.46%	3,968	4.13%	342	0.36%	-9,039	-9.41%	96,013
Morrow	985	34.87%	1,701	60.21%	133	4.71%	6	0.21%	-716	-25.35%	2,825
Multnomah	159,242	65.90%	70,745	29.28%	10,658	4.41%	979	0.41%	88,497	36.63%	241,624
Polk	10,956	43.74%	13,128	52.42%	922	3.68%	40	0.16%	-2,172	-8.67%	25,046
Sherman	306	33.19%	549	59.54%	66	7.16%	1	0.11%	-243	-26.36%	922
Tillamook	5,025	48.05%	4,818	46.07%	586	5.60%	29	0.28%	207	1.98%	10,458
Umatilla	7,092	38.35%	10,707	57.89%	656	3.55%	39	0.21%	-3,615	-19.55%	18,494
Union	3,611	36.22%	5,853	58.71%	484	4.86%	21	0.21%	-2,242	-22.49%	9,969
Wallowa	986	28.52%	2,283	66.04%	182	5.26%	6	0.17%	-1,297	-37.52%	3,457
Wasco	4,156	45.90%	4,374	48.30%	498	5.50%	27	0.30%	-218	-2.41%	9,055
Washington	70,859	47.58%	71,809	48.22%	6,203	4.17%	57	0.04%	-950	-0.64%	148,928
Wheeler	227	33.19%	416	60.82%	39	5.70%	2	0.29%	-189	-27.63%	684
Yamhill	12,189	39.96%	16,565	54.31%	1,589	5.21%	157	0.51%	-4,376	-14.35%	30,500
Total	618,004	49.03%	581,785	46.16%	57,760	4.58%	2,948	0.23%	36,219	2.87%	1,260,197

==== Counties that flipped from Democratic to Republican ====
- Baker (largest city: Baker City)
- Clackamas (largest city: Lake Oswego)
- Coos (Largest city: Coos Bay)
- Crook (largest city: Prineville)
- Curry (largest city: Brookings)
- Douglas (largest city: Roseburg)
- Deschutes (largest municipality: Bend)
- Grant (largest city: John Day)
- Gilliam (Largest city: Condon)
- Harney (largest city: Burns)
- Jefferson (largest city: Madras)
- Josephine (largest city: Grants Pass)
- Klamath (largest city: Klamath Falls)
- Lake (largest city: Lakeview)
- Linn (largest city: Albany)
- Morrow (Largest city: Boardman)
- Jackson (largest city: Medford)
- Marion (largest city: Salem)
- Polk (largest city: Salem)
- Sherman (largest city: Wasco)
- Umatilla (largest city: Hermiston)
- Union (largest city: La Grande)
- Wallowa (largest city: Enterprise)
- Wasco (largest city: The Dalles)
- Washington (largest city: Hillsboro)
- Wheeler (largest city: Fossil)
- Yamhill (largest city: McMinnville)
