= Kevin Mannix =

American politician (born 1949)

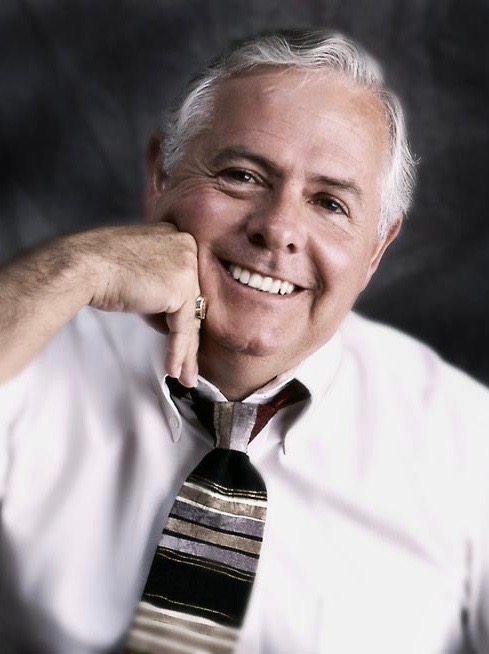

Member of the Oregon House of Representatives
- Incumbent
- Assumed office January 9, 2023
- Preceded by: Chris Hoy
- Constituency: 21st district
- In office January 1999 – January 2001
- Preceded by: Tom Whelan
- Succeeded by: Janet Carlson
- Constituency: 32nd district
- In office January 1989 – January 1997
- Preceded by: Charles Sides
- Succeeded by: Tom Whelan
- Constituency: 32nd district

Chair of the Oregon Republican Party
- In office January 2003 – 2005
- Succeeded by: Vance Day

Member of the Oregon State Senate from the 17th district
- In office 1997–1998
- Preceded by: Shirley Stull
- Succeeded by: Peter Courtney

Personal details
- Born: November 26, 1949 (age 76) New York City, U.S.
- Party: Democratic (before 1997); Republican (1997–present)
- Spouse: Susanna
- Children: 3
- Education: University of Virginia (BA, JD)

Kevin Leese Mannix (born November 26, 1949) is an American politician and attorney currently serving as a member of the Oregon House of Representatives from the 21st district representing Keizer and parts of Salem. A member of the Republican Party, he served as chairman of the Oregon Republican Party from 2003 to 2005, and was the Republican nominee for Attorney General in 2000, and Governor in 2002.

He had previously served in the House of Representatives representing the 32nd district from 1989 to 1997 as a Democrat, and 1999 to 2001 as a Republican. He served in the Oregon State Senate from 1997 to 1998.

== Early life and education ==
Mannix was born on November 26, 1949 in New York City. As a child, he grew up in Latin America, living in Ecuador, Panama, and Bolivia while his father was served in the United States Foreign Service. He attended a Catholic school from first through fourth grade where he was immersed in the Spanish language. He moved back to the United States and attended Wakefield High School in Arlington County, Virginia. The year he attended was the first year it was integrated. At Wakefield, he was student body vice-president and later president.

Mannix earned a bachelor's degree in liberal arts in 1971 from the University of Virginia. In 1974, he earned his J.D. degree from the University of Virginia School of Law.

== Career ==
Prior to serving in the legislature, Mannix worked in several different capacities, including Assistant Attorney General of Oregon, Assistant Attorney General of Guam, and a law clerk to the Oregon Court of Appeals.

=== Oregon Legislature (1989-2001) ===
Mannix was elected to the Oregon House of Representatives five times beginning in 1988. From 1989 through 1996, Mannix served in the Oregon House of Representatives as a Democrat. In 1997, he became a Republican and was appointed to the Oregon State Senate. He was elected back into the Oregon House in November 1998 and served through 2000.

=== Attorney General elections ===
In 1996, Mannix ran for Oregon Attorney General as a Democrat. At the last minute, Hardy Myers was recruited by Democrats to run against Mannix in the Democratic primary, as some felt Mannix was too conservative for their party. Myers defeated Mannix in the primary 62.8% to 36.8%. Myers went on to easily defeat his Republican opponent in the November general election. Mannix changed his party affiliation to Republican the following year, 1997. He was appointed to the state Senate in 1997.

In 2000, Mannix ran as a Republican for State Attorney General, winning the GOP nomination and facing Myers in a bitter campaign. Myers again defeated Mannix 49.8% to 46.2%. Libertarian candidate Tom Cox received 4.0%. There is the possibility that Cox siphoned off votes from Mannix, although it's far from certain that enough of them would have supported him to deny Myers victory.

=== 2002 Gubernatorial campaign ===
In 2002, Mannix ran for governor. In the Republican primary, he defeated former Labor Commissioner Jack Roberts and Portland attorney and school board chair Ron Saxton. He went on to run against Democrat Ted Kulongoski. Kulongoski won 49% of the vote versus 46% for Mannix. Libertarian candidate Tom Cox received 5% – a margin which many observe could have swung the election, had those votes gone to Mannix. The defeat also marked the fifth time in a row the Republicans failed to gain control of the governorship.

=== Other races and leadership positions ===
Mannix became Oregon Republican Party Chair in January 2003, and stepped down in 2005.

In 2006, Mannix ran again for the Republican nomination for governor. He finished second in the primary with 30% of the vote, behind Saxton, who won the nomination with 43%, and ahead of state senator Jason Atkinson, who received 22%. Mannix was opposed in the primary by the Confederated Tribes of Grand Ronde, who spent $800,000 opposing the Columbia Gorge casino in the 2006 Democratic and Republican primaries. Saxton, widely considered more moderate than Mannix, went on to lose the general election in May to incumbent Kulongoski by an 8.1% margin.

In 2008, Mannix ran for the United States House of Representatives in the U.S. House primary election for Oregon's 5th congressional district to succeed retiring Democrat Darlene Hooley. Mannix ran a vigorous campaign, but was narrowly defeated by Mike Erickson, who went on to lose to Kurt Schrader in the general election due in part to personal issues that Mannix brought up in the primary.

Mannix serves as president for several organizations, including the Oregon Anti-Crime Alliance, which he founded in 2008, and Common Sense For Oregon, which he founded in 2009. He is a member of the board of directors for the Salem Catholic Schools Foundation, a role he has served in since 1985, and he has been president of the foundation since 2000. He was a founder and has served as chairman of the board of directors for Blanchet Catholic School in Salem since it opened in 1995, is a member of the Knights of Columbus and has been a member of Rotary International since 1982. He served on the national board of directors for Life Directions and the Salem Chamber of Commerce board of directors from 2007 to 2013. Mannix is also a board member, and vice president, of the Johann Strauss Society of America Foundation. This organization was founded in 2013 and is dedicated to supporting the music heritage of Johann Strauss.

Mannix's main financial donor in his political career is Loren Parks, a businessman who is currently a resident of Nevada. Loren Parks has contributed over $4 million to Mannix's political efforts since 1994.

=== Oregon Legislature (2023-present) ===
In January 2022, Mannix announced that he would run for the Salem-area House District 21 seat, marking a return to electoral politics after earlier legislative, statewide, and congressional campaigns. Mannix was elected to the Oregon House of Representatives in the 2022 election, representing the 21st district. He was re-elected in 2024 by a margin of less than four points.

Salem Reporter reported in July 2025 that Mannix had supported House Bill 2316, concerning the possible sale of unused state property for housing, and House Bill 2299, concerning digitally created or altered depictions used for stalking or harassment.

Kevin Mannix was defeated in the November 2026 General Election in his bid for re-election by Michael Welsh. Once considered impossible to beat in Oregon electoral politics, Mannix lost his bid for re-election by nearly 10 points. Mannix did not issue a public concession statement.

== Ballot measure advocacy ==
=== Measure 11 ===
In 1994, Mannix authored Ballot Measure 11, which established mandatory minimum sentences for violent crimes, including murder, manslaughter, serious assault, kidnapping, rape, sodomy, unlawful sexual penetration, sexual abuse, and robbery. This measure has also now been used to set automatic sentencing on accidental deaths due to addiction issues. A companion measure, Measure 10, also passed, amending the Oregon Constitution to say that any criminal sentence established by a vote of the people cannot be reduced by the legislature except with a two-thirds vote of both houses. A third successful Mannix measure, Measure 17, amended the Oregon Constitution to establish a new section which requires that state prison inmates work full-time in useful work. This also allowed work time to include education courses, counseling, and job training.

=== Measure 40 ===
In 1996, Mannix brought Ballot Measure 40 to the ballot. This contained several victims' rights and anti-crime provisions. The effects of these Measures is to set the primary locus of control in sentencing decisions with victims and prosecutors. Measure 40 passed by a margin of 59% to 41%, but was overturned by the Oregon Supreme Court in Armatta v. Kitzhaber, 327 Or. 250, 959 P.2d 49 (1998) on the grounds that it contained more than one amendment to the Oregon Constitution and should have been subject to separate votes on each provision.

Measure 40 returned to voters by legislative referral (engineered by Representative Mannix) as Measures 69 through 75 in November 1999. Of the seven referral measures, four were passed by voters, which granted crime victims the right to be present during trial, to be consulted regarding plea bargains and to be heard at sentencing; limited the pre-trial release of violent criminals by authorizing courts to consider the safety of victims and the public; required that any term of imprisonment imposed by a court to be fully served, with the exception of the governor's clemency power; and prohibited felons from serving on grand juries and criminal trial juries.

=== Measure 61 ===
In 2008, Mannix helped lead a citizen initiative effort for Measure 61 which would have created mandatory minimum prison sentences for certain theft, identity theft, forgery, drug and burglary crimes. This measure was trumped by Measure 57, a legislative referral which avoided mandatory minimum sentences in favor of increased sentences for drug trafficking, theft against the elderly, and certain repeat property and identity theft crimes.

=== Measure 73 ===
Another citizen initiative effort led by Mannix in 2010, Measure 73, was approved. This measure provided a mandatory minimum prison sentence of 25 years for repeat convictions of certain sex crimes and required a minimum sentence of 90 days in jail, with costs reimbursed to the county by the state, for persons with a third DUII conviction within 10 years.

=== Other measures ===
In 2012, Measure 84, an effort to repeal Oregon's estate tax, was also supported by Mannix but was defeated.

For the Oregon 2014 general election, Mannix, and Common Sense For Oregon, supported several initiatives, including No Taxes on Family Giving and the Oregon Castle Doctrine.

== Electoral history ==
2024 Oregon State Representative, 21st district
Party	Candidate	Votes	%
Republican	Kevin L Mannix	14,924	51.8
Democratic	Virginia Stapleton	13,822	48.0
Write-in		49	0.2
Total votes		28,795	100%

2022 Oregon State Representative, 21st district
Party	Candidate	Votes	%
Republican	Kevin L Mannix	13,115	51.4
Democratic	Ramiro Navarro Jr	11,646	45.6
Libertarian	Michael Morrow	738	2.9
Write-in		26	0.1
Total votes		25,525	100%

2008 race for U.S. House of Representatives – Republican primary

- Mike Erickson (R), 49%
- Kevin Mannix (R), 46%

2006 race for governor – Republican primary

- Ron Saxton (R), 43%
- Kevin Mannix (R), 30%
- Jason Atkinson (R), 22%

2002 race for governor

- Ted Kulongoski (D), 49%
- Kevin Mannix (R), 46%
- Tom Cox (L), 5%

2002 race for governor – Republican primary

- Kevin Mannix (R), 35%
- Jack Roberts (R), 29%
- Ron Saxton (R), 28%

2000 race for state attorney general

- Hardy Myers (D) (inc.), 50%
- Kevin Mannix (R), 46%

2000 race for state attorney general – Republican primary

- Mannix won the Republication nomination for Oregon Attorney General.

1998 Oregon general election

- Mannix defeated Democrat George Bell for Oregon House of Representatives District 32.

1998 Oregon primary election

- Mannix won the Republican nomination for House District 32.

1996 Oregon primary election

- Former House Speaker Hardy Myers defeated Mannix for the Democratic nomination for attorney general.

1994 Oregon primary election

- Mannix won the Democratic nomination for House District 32.

1992 Oregon general election

- Mannix defeated Republican challenger Mark Berlin for House District 32 by 68% to 32%

1992 Oregon primary election

- Mannix won the Democratic nomination for House District 32.

1990 Oregon general election

- Mannix defeated two challengers for House District 32. Mannix won with 64% of the vote.

1990 Oregon primary election

- Mannix won the Democratic nomination for House District 32.

1988 Oregon general election

- Mannix defeated Republican incumbent Chuck Sides for House District 32.

1988 Oregon primary election

- Mannix won the Democratic nomination for Oregon House of Representative District 32.

== See also ==
- List of American politicians who switched parties in office
- Oregon gubernatorial election, 2006
- United States House of Representatives elections in Oregon, 2008

Party political offices
Preceded by Bill Sizemore	Republican nominee for Governor of Oregon; 2002	Succeeded by Ron Saxton
