= Julia Brim-Edwards =

American politician and businesswoman (born 1961)

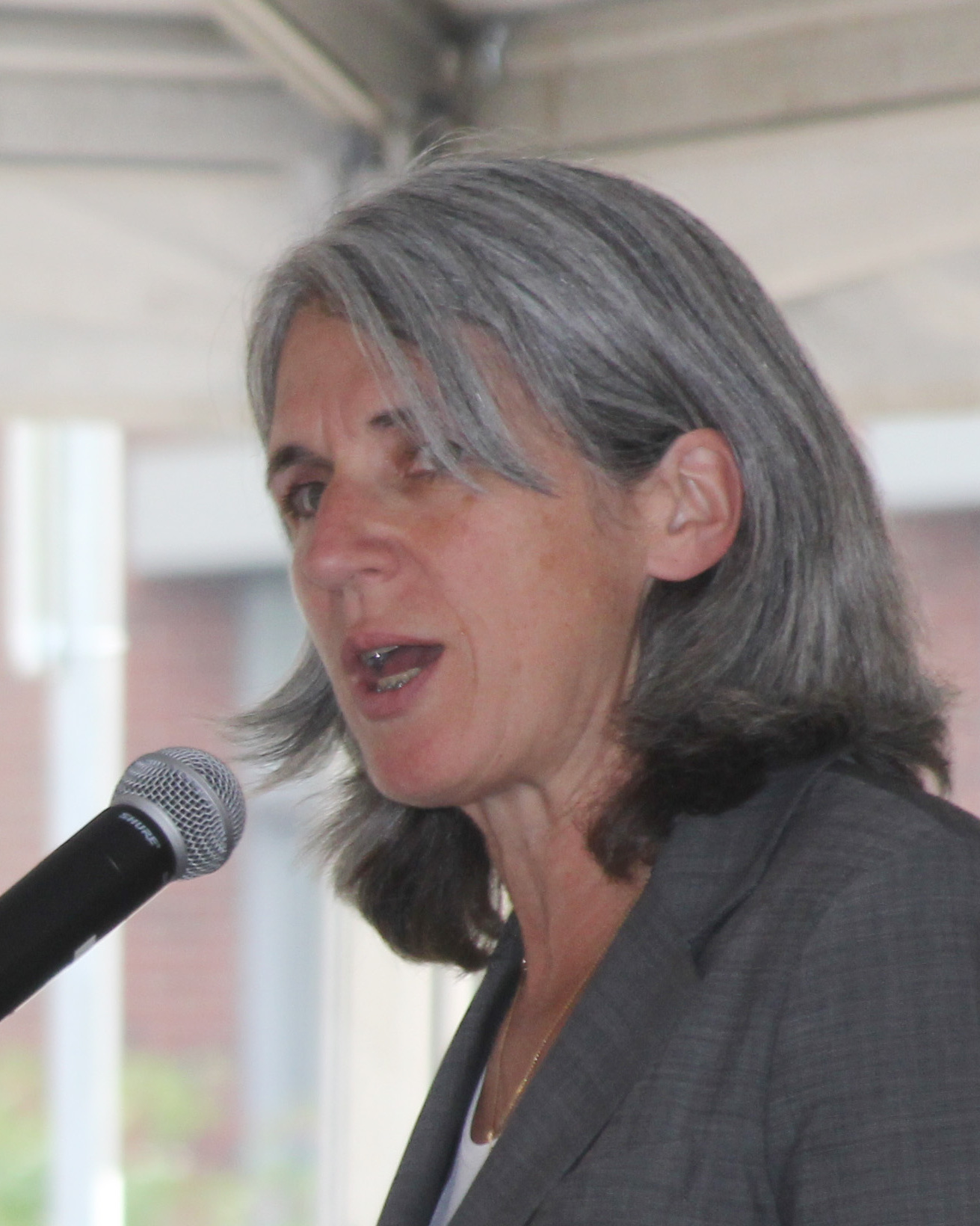
- Brim-Edwards in 2014

Multnomah County Commissioner from the 3rd District
- Incumbent
- Assumed office June 12, 2023
- Preceded by: Diane Rosenbaum

Member of the Portland Public Schools Board of Education, Zone 6
- Incumbent
- Assumed office 2017
- Preceded by: Tom Koehler
- In office 2001–2005
- Preceded by: Ron Saxton
- Succeeded by: Trudy Sargent

Personal details
- Born: Julia Ann Brim; September 5, 1961
- Spouse: Randall Edwards
- Children: 3
- Education: Oregon State University (BA)

Julia Ann Brim-Edwards (born September 5, 1961) is an American businesswoman and politician. She has served as a county commissioner for Multnomah County, Oregon since June 12, 2023, representing district 3. She has also served on the Portland Public Schools Board of Education since 2017, where she previously served as board chair from 2001 to 2005. In 2016 she was appointed to the Oregon State University Board of Trustees. Prior to 2022 Brim-Edwards worked as a senior director at Nike.

== Early life and education ==
Brim-Edwards grew up in Mt Tabor and attended Glencoe Elementary and Washington-Monroe High School. She played six sports as a high school athlete and was inducted into the Portland Interscholastic League Hall of Fame in 2015.

== Career ==
=== Portland Public School Board ===
On September 5, 2023, the school board unanimously passed a resolution introduced by Brim-Edwards to take control of the Grant High School field and expedite repairs to its damaged artificial turf. The field, owned by the Portland parks bureau, had been abruptly closed just days before the start of the school year, prompting significant criticism from parents.

=== Multnomah County Commissioner ===
In July 2023 Brim-Edwards opposed a plan by the county health department to distribute tin foil and straws to fentanyl users, stating "there is no compelling evidence that it is comparable to safe needle exchanges or that the county currently has capacity to connect individuals to treatment who want it". The plan was suspended by chair Jessica Vega Pederson three days after it was first reported.

In September 2023 Brim-Edwards criticized a decision to replace the county's former sobering center, which closed in 2020, with a stabilization center intended for longer-term treatment. Unlike the previous center, which accepted drop offs from first responders and was often described as a "drunk tank", the replacement would provide 30–60 days of transitional housing and stabilization treatment for patients leaving other sobering programs. Brim-Edwards emphasized the need for a new crisis treatment center, arguing that the original sobering center had seen over 5,000 patients during its final year in 2019.

On May 21, 2024, Brim-Edwards won reelection with 76% of the vote. She was sworn in for a full 4-year term in January 2025.

In September 2024, Brim-Edwards brought forward an amendment that would index Multnomah County's Preschool for All program tax to inflation. In June 2025, Oregon Governor Tina Kotek called on Multnomah County leaders to change tax structure, fearing that it was pushing high-income earners out of Multnomah County. Around the same time, several state senators — including Senator Kate Lieber, Senator Kathleen Taylor and Senator Mark Meek — sought to pass an amendment to Oregon Senate Bill 106 that would have sunsetted the Preschool for All program, although the amendment was not passed. In August, the Multnomah County Board of Commissioners held public meetings related to Preschool for All and Brim-Edwards' indexing proposal. During these meetings, a coalition known as Friends of Preschool for All urged lawmakers to vote against the proposal, emphasizing that it would stop the program from reaching universal coverage by 2030. On August 21, Brim-Edwards tabled a motion to postpone her proposal until more information about the potential impact of indexing could be gathered. A majority of the commission voted with her.

== Personal life ==
Brim-Edwards and her husband, Randall Edwards, raised their three children in Southeast Portland where they both volunteer in the classroom and in school athletics.

== Electoral history ==
2023 Multnomah County Commission District 3 Special Election
| Party | Candidate | Votes | % |
|---|---|---|---|
| Nonpartisan | Julia Brim-Edwards | 20,389 | 55.64% |
| Nonpartisan | Ana del Rocío | 13,686 | 37.35% |
| Nonpartisan | Albert Kaufman | 2,346 | 6.40% |
| Other | Write-ins | 223 | 0.61% |
| Total votes | | 36,644 | 100.00% |

2021 Portland Public Schools Board of Education Zone 6
| Party | Candidate | Votes | % |
|---|---|---|---|
| Nonpartisan | Julia Brim-Edwards | 75,279 | 80.69% |
| Nonpartisan | Mathew (Max) Margolis | 10,866 | 11.65% |
| Nonpartisan | Libby Glynn | 6,615 | 7.09% |
| Other | Write-ins | 530 | 0.57% |
| Total votes | | 93,290 | 100.00% |

2017 Portland Public Schools Board of Education Zone 6
| Party | Candidate | Votes | % |
|---|---|---|---|
| Nonpartisan | Julia Brim-Edwards | 63,356 | 67.11% |
| Nonpartisan | Trisha D Parks | 15,087 | 15.98% |
| Nonpartisan | Joseph L Simonis | 8,005 | 8.48% |
| Nonpartisan | David Morrison | 2,889 | 3.06% |
| Nonpartisan | Ed Bos | 2,446 | 2.59% |
| Nonpartisan | Zach Babb | 2,063 | 2.19% |
| Other | Write-ins | 565 | 0.60% |
| Total votes | | 94,411 | 100.00% |
