= Jack Roberts (politician) =

American politician from Oregon (born 1952)

Commissioner of the Oregon Bureau of Labor and Industries
- In office January 2, 1995 – January 6, 2003
- Governor: John Kitzhaber
- Preceded by: Mary Wendy Roberts
- Succeeded by: Dan Gardner

Lane County Commissioner
- In office 1989–1995

Personal details
- Born: October 1952 (age 73–74)
- Party: Republican
- Education: University of Oregon
- Occupation: Attorney, politician

Jack Roberts (born October 1952) is an attorney and politician in the U.S. state of Oregon. A Republican, his highest office has been Oregon Commissioner of Labor and Industries, which he held from 1995 to 2003. He previously served as a Lane County commissioner from 1989 to 1995.

Roberts was the last Oregon Republican to hold statewide office in state government until Dennis Richardson was elected Oregon Secretary of State in 2016. Roberts ran unsuccessfully for the Republican nomination for the U.S. Senate in 1996 and for Governor of Oregon in 2002. He came close to winning the latter, but ultimately lost to Kevin Mannix. He was considered a contender to take on incumbent U.S. Senator Ron Wyden in 2004, but did not enter the race. He also ran for the Oregon Supreme Court in 2006, losing to Virginia Linder.

He was the executive director of the Lane Metro Partnership until September 2013. In October 2013, he was selected to be the director of the Oregon Lottery by the Governor John Kitzhaber. An attorney, Roberts lives in Eugene.
