= American Association of State Climatologists =

US Climate Change organization

The American Association of State Climatologists (AASC) is a professional scientific organization for climatologists in the United States. The organisation was founded in 1976.

== Overview ==
The core membership in the AASC consists of the 47 State Climatologists and the official climatologist of Puerto Rico. There is one State Climatologist for each state in the United States. The individual is appointed by the state and is recognized by the National Climatic Data Center of the NOAA, with whom the AASC collaborates. The other full members of the AASC are the directors of the six Regional Climate Centers. There are also associate members of the AASC, bringing the total membership to approximately 150. Members and associate members of the AASC perform various climatological services and research. The current president is Lesley-Ann L. Dupigny-Giroux.

The AASC also publishes the Journal of Service Climatology.

== Criticism ==
At least three of the organization's full members (John Christy, Alabama, Philip Mote, Washington and David Robinson, New Jersey) served as contributing authors for the Fourth Assessment Report: Annex of the Intergovernmental Panel on Climate Change (IPCC). In 2007 two members came under scrutiny for their "skeptical" views toward anthropogenic climate change.
