= Jim Hill (Oregon politician) =

American politician (born 1947)

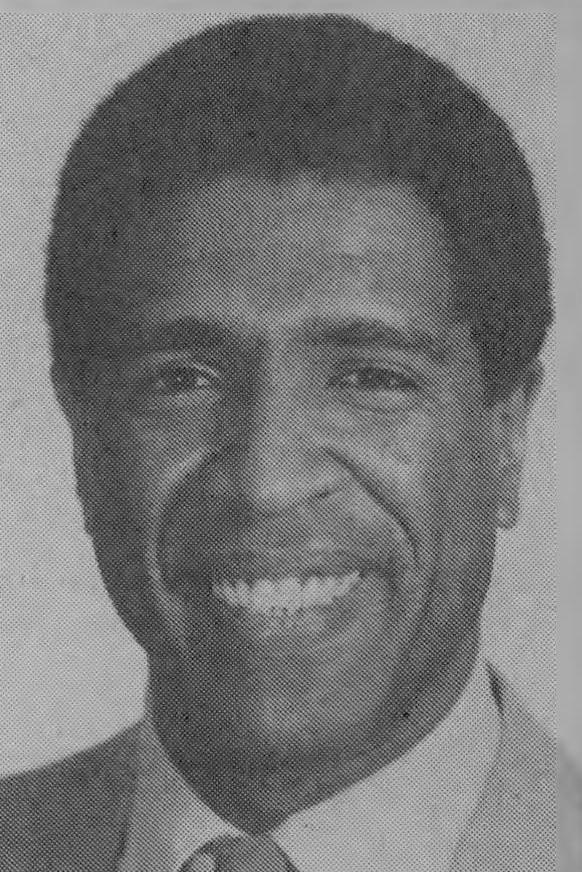

25th Oregon State Treasurer
- In office January 4, 1993 – January 1, 2001
- Governor: Barbara Roberts; John Kitzhaber
- Preceded by: Tony Meeker
- Succeeded by: Randall Edwards

Member of the Oregon Senate from the 16th district
- In office January 12, 1987 – January 4, 1993
- Preceded by: L. B. Day
- Succeeded by: Catherine Webber

Member of the Oregon House of Representatives from the 31st district
- In office January 10, 1983 – January 12, 1987
- Preceded by: Alan C. Riebel
- Succeeded by: Rocky Barilla

Personal details
- Born: April 23, 1947 (age 79) Atlanta, Georgia, U.S.
- Party: Democratic
- Education: Michigan State University (BA)

Jim Hill (born April 23, 1947) is an American attorney, financial consultant, and politician who served two terms as Oregon State Treasurer from January 4, 1993, to January 1, 2001. Hill was the first African American to hold a statewide office in Oregon, and previously served in both chambers of the Oregon Legislative Assembly.

== Early life and education ==
He was born in Atlanta, Georgia. He earned a Bachelor of Arts degree in economics from Michigan State University in 1969. He received both an Master of Business Administration (1971) and a Juris Doctor (1974) from Indiana University Bloomington.

== Career ==
Hill was elected treasurer in 1992, the first African American elected to statewide office in Oregon. He had previously served in the Oregon State Senate (1987–1993) and the Oregon House of Representatives (1983–1987). He ran unsuccessfully for the House in 1980, and for governor in 2002 and 2006.

In 2010, Hill was briefly a candidate in the special election for Oregon State Treasurer, to complete the term of Ben Westlund, who died in office.

== Personal life ==
Divorced with one grown daughter, Hill resides in Salem, Oregon.

Political offices
Preceded by Tony Meeker	Treasurer of Oregon; 1993–2001	Succeeded by Randall Edwards
