= Public Commission on the Oregon Legislature =

American state-based inquiry

The Public Commission on the Oregon Legislature (PCOL) was a group of 30 citizens in the U.S. state of Oregon charged with developing recommendations on how to improve the Oregon Legislative Assembly. The 2005 session of the legislature established the commission with Senate Bill 1084. The bill, which declared an emergency, took effect upon its passage, when it was signed by Governor Ted Kulongoski on July 29, 2005.

The PCOL submitted its final report for the consideration of the 74th legislature on November 13, 2006. The 74th legislature implemented several of the recommendations.

== Reception, impact and criticism ==
The PCOL's recommendation to establish an "open" primary (also known as a nonpartisan blanket primary) was taken up by two former Secretaries of State, Phil Keisling and Norma Paulus, in the form of a ballot initiative. The effort narrowly missed qualifying for the 2006 general elections ballot, but a slightly modified version qualified for the 2008 general election ballot as ballot measure 65.

The Bend Bulletin criticized the PCOL's recommendations regarding the initiative and referendum system in an editorial, noting that the system was outside the PCOL's purview, and taking issue with the selective nature of the recommendations.

Recommendations to renovate the Oregon State Capitol were acted upon by the 2007 session of the legislature, and were noted in advertisements in the 2008 U.S. Senate race.

== Recommendations ==
The commission's report included recommendations on the following topics:

Fundamental reform:

- Open Primary
- Nonpartisan Legislature
- Nonpartisan State Controller
- Redistricting Commission
- Funding Government Standards and Practices Commission
- Initiative Reform
- Campaign Finance
- Legislator Compensation

Institutional reform:

- Annual Sessions and Session Structure
- Partisanship
- Staffing Legislative Offices
- Hiring Family Members
- Alcohol Consumption
- Public Access

Reforming legislative operations:

- Committees
- Bills and Amendments
- Program Evaluation
- Budget Notes

Improving facilities and technology:

- Capitol Renovation and Comprehensive Facilities Plan
- Wireless Access
- Use of Technology
- Oregon Channel
- Audio and Video Hardware
- Security

== Commission members ==
Commission member	Title/organization	Committee assignment
Dave Barrows		Management and Human Resources Committee
Deborah Boone	State representative	The Public Institution Committee
Daniel Bernstine	President, Portland State University	Management and Human Resources Committee
Frank Brawner		Management and Human Resources Committee
Bridget Burns		Facilities Committee
Jane Cease		Management and Human Resources Committee
Kim Skerritt Duncan	Tri-Met	Process Committee
David Frohnmayer	President, University of Oregon	Process Committee
Mark Garber	The Gresham Outlook	Facilities Committee
Avel Gordly	State senator	Process Committee
Hasso Hering	Albany Democrat-Herald	Public Institution Committee
Jim Hill	former Treasurer of Oregon	Management and Human Resources Committee
Barbara Karmel		Process Committee
Wayne Krieger	State representative	Facilities Committee
Ginny Lang		Chair, Process Committee
John Lattimer		Chair, Management and Human Resources Committee
Susan M. Leeson		Management and Human Resources Committee
Hans A. Linde		Process Committee
Greg Merten		Management and Human Resources Committee
Frank Morse	State senator	Management and Human Resources Committee
Delores Pigsley		Management and Human Resources Committee
Laura Pryor	Judge, Gilliam County Court	Public Institution Committee
Raul Ramirez	Sheriff, Marion County	Facilities Committee
Gretchen Schuette	President, Chemeketa Community College	Public Institution Committee
Connie Seeley	Office of the Senate President	Chair, Management and Human Resources Committee
Kerry Tymchuk		Chair, Public Institution Committee
Gary Wilhelms		Facilities Committee
Carl Wilson		Chair, Facilities Committee
Junki Yoshida		Public Institution Committee

== See also ==
- Oregon State Senate
- Oregon House of Representatives
