= Charles Crookham =

American judge

Charles S. Crookham

13th Attorney General of Oregon
- In office January 2, 1992 – January 3, 1993
- Governor: Barbara Roberts
- Preceded by: David B. Frohnmayer
- Succeeded by: Ted Kulongoski

Presiding Judge Oregon Circuit Court
- In office 1978–1986

Judge, Oregon Circuit Court
- In office 1963–1988

Personal details
- Born: March 17, 1923 Portland, Oregon, U.S.
- Died: October 7, 2004 (aged 81) Portland, Oregon, U.S.
- Party: Republican
- Spouse: Elizabeth Pruden Kelley
- Children: 3
- Occupation: Attorney, Judge

Charles Sewell Crookham (March 17, 1923 – October 7, 2004), a native and lifelong resident of the U.S. state of Oregon, was a lawyer, a Republican politician, jurist, and military historian. He was briefly Oregon Attorney General, appointed to serve out David Frohnmayer's uncompleted term, but most of his professional career was spent in the private practice of law and as a judge.

== Early life ==
Crookham was born on St. Patrick's Day in 1923 in Portland, Oregon. He was the son of Kenneth Crookham, who worked for an automobile dealership at the time, and who later went into the business himself. He grew up in the family home on Northeast 38th Street, attending neighborhood schools. He had already decided on a career in law at the age of eight, at the urging of an uncle.

He earned his high school diploma at Grant High School, then attended Oregon State University, Loyola College of Los Angeles, and Multnomah College, before graduating Stanford University with a BA, and earning a JD from Northwestern School of Law (now a part of Lewis & Clark College).

While in college, the Japanese attack on Pearl Harbor prompted his enlistment in the United States Army, and during his World War II service he saw combat in Europe earning a Bronze Star. He remained active in the Army Reserve after the war's conclusion, rising to the rank of colonel.

== Career ==
=== State court judge ===
Crookham's early career was as a trial attorney, earning a reputation as a premier appellate lawyer. He was first appointed to the bench by Oregon Governor Mark O. Hatfield in 1962, serving as a judge from 1963 to 1988, and as presiding judge between 1978 and 1985.

As presiding judge, he was often seen carrying case files, insisting on reading each one in its entirety before assignment to a trial judge. Known for being serious about the law and his work, but not about himself, he also had a lighter side. He once held a mock funeral service at the courthouse for Roman numerals, retiring them from use in state pleadings.

"He loved lawyers, and he loved practicing the law, and it showed every day," recalled Clackamas County, Oregon District Attorney John Foote to a journalist. Foote had been a young clerk for Crookham as presiding judge. "He taught me how to be a lawyer," Foote is quoted as saying.

Appearances in Crookham's court were "short and sweet," according to a quotation in the press by Timothy Wood of the Oregon Department of Justice, who had argued at trial before the judge. Crookham didn't cut the lawyers' arguments short out of impatience or rudeness, but because he had already studied the issues so thoroughly. "He told one lawyer, 'Keep on talking, and you'll still lose this,' " Wood said.

=== Attorney General ===
In January, 1992, Crookham became Oregon Attorney General, appointed by the Governor, Barbara Roberts to fill the vacancy created by the resignation of David B. Frohnmayer who left to become University of Oregon's law school dean. Within the month, he announced that he would not seek election to retain the post beyond the unexpired term of his appointment.

His decision left the field wide open for candidates, and a hotly contested race resulted in both the Republican and Democratic Party of Oregon primaries that year. Craig Berkman, Oregon Republican chairman at the time, was reported to be disappointed at Crookham's decision not to run. "Frankly, this makes it very difficult for the Republican Party," Berkman is quoted as saying. "I think he would have made an excellent candidate, but I can hardly blame him for not wanting to commit to an office that he would be in until at least age 73."

== Personal ==
Crookham, who generally sported a bow tie, was also a master chef with a flair for barbecue, longtime friend U.S. District Judge Robert E. Jones said in an interview shortly after Crookham's death, adding that he insisted on being called Charles and was never "Charlie" or "Chuck." "He had a regal aura about him," Jones said, "without being pretentious.

He was also an avid reader throughout his life. Even in the last days of his life, when macular degeneration had ravaged his vision, he devoured books with the help of his brother, Robert. "In the last couple of years, they read over 40 novels," his son, Whitney, told a reporter. "If my dad was at the beach for the weekend, my uncle would call and read to him over the phone."

Crookham's son, Berkeley Fitzcharles Crookham was convicted in 1995 at age 36 "on a felony charge in the beating of his [6-week-old] infant daughter" and booked into jail on June 28, 1995, in Multnomah County, Oregon in a case covered extensively in the Oregon press.

Legal offices
Preceded by David B. Frohnmayer	Oregon Attorney General; 1992–1993	Succeeded by Ted Kulongoski
