= Del Riley =

Del Riley may refer to:

- Delbert Riley, a Canadian First Nations leader and former Chief of the National Indian Brotherhood
- Del Riley (clerk), the county clerk who pioneered Oregon's vote-by-mail system
