= Joshua Marquis =

American lawyer (born 1952)

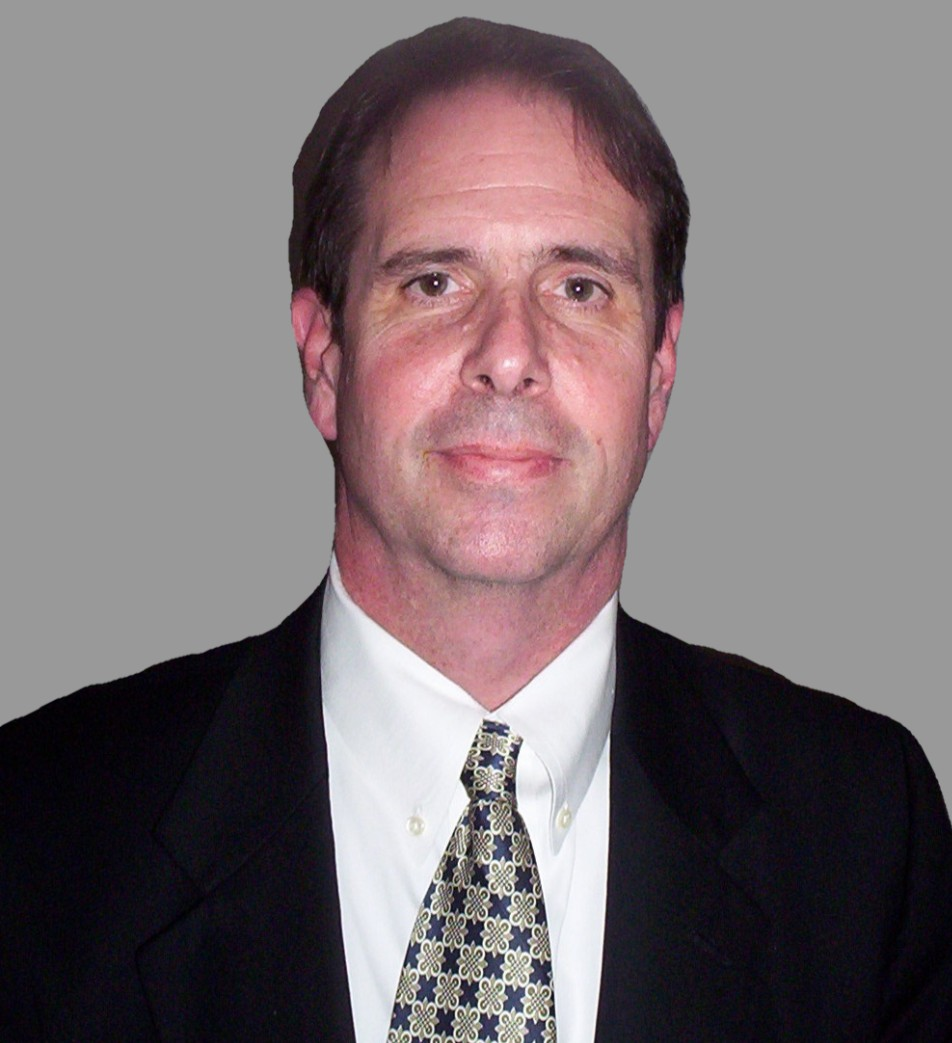

District Attorney of Clatsop County
- In office 1994–2018
- Succeeded by: Ron Brown

Personal details
- Born: 1952 (age 73–74) Los Angeles, CA
- Party: Democratic
- Spouse: Cynthia Price
- Website: www.coastda.com

Joshua K. Marquis (born 1952) is an attorney and politician from Astoria, Oregon, in the United States. He served as District Attorney for Clatsop County from March 1994 until December 31, 2018. He frequently writes and speaks about capital punishment, and is a national advocate for the death penalty.

== Early career ==
Marquis earned a Juris Doctor degree from the University of Oregon. He later served as Deputy District Attorney for Lincoln and Lane counties, and then as Chief Deputy District Attorney for Deschutes and Lincoln counties.

== Clatsop County District Attorney ==
Marquis was appointed District Attorney in Clatsop County by then-Governor Barbara Roberts after his predecessor was convicted and disbarred for gross prosecutorial misconduct. Marquis was elected in 1994 and reelected in 1998, 2002, 2006, 2010, and 2014

On January 3, 2018, Marquis announced he would not seek a full 7th terms as DA (technically an 8th if one includes the approximately one year to which Marquis was appointed by then-Gov. Barbara Roberts in late February 1994 which ended in early January 1995

Marquis served as a superdelegate to the 1996 Democratic National Convention.

In 2019 Marquis was appointed Director of Legal Affairs and Enforcement of Animal Wellness Action, a Washington, D.C.–based anti-cruelty organization headed by Wayne Pacelle, former CEO of the Humane Society of the United States.

== Death penalty advocacy ==
Marquis coauthored Debating the Death Penalty, and numerous other articles that were cited by U.S. Supreme Court Justice Antonin Scalia in his concurrence in the Supreme Court's decision in Kansas v. Marsh. Marquis worked as a reporter for the Los Angeles Daily Journal in the early 1980s and the speechwriter to California Attorney General John Van de Kamp in the mid-1980s.

Marquis is often solicited to write articles on the death penalty, such as the lead article in a special section published by the Los Angeles Times prior to the execution of Stanley "Tookie" Williams.

Marquis appeared on Penn and Teller's TV program, "Bullshit!" - season 4, Episode 3 about the Death Penalty.

Marquis led the prosecution of double murderer Randy Lee Guzek, Oregon v. Guzek, who murdered Rod and Lois Houser in 1987 in their home north of Redmond, Oregon. Marquis was the sole or lead prosecutor in three separate re-sentencing trials held in Deschutes County, Oregon (Bend) in 1991, 1997 and 2010. Guzek's death sentence was affirmed by the Oregon Supreme Court in 2015 and the United States Supreme Court declined to grant cert in 2017. While a criminal defense attorney in Eugene, Oregon, from 1989 to 1990 Marquis was lead defense counsel in the cases of two men charged with capital murder – Javier Blanco and Allen Flower – neither man was sentenced to death.

In October 2011 Marquis was one of four panelists invited to discuss capital punishment at the New Yorker Festival on a panel that also included Innocence Project founder Barry Scheck, death penalty opponent Danalynn Recer, and crime victim's advocate Marc Klaas. CNN's Jeffrey Toobin moderated the event at the Directors Guild Theater in Manhattan, New York City.

== Other activities ==
Marquis also served on Oregon's Criminal Justice Commission from 2005 to 2009, served as vice chair of the Animal Legal Defense Fund. and was elected in August 2009 to the American Bar Association's Criminal Justice Leadership Council for a three-year term. Marquis was a member of the Board of Directors of the National District Attorneys Association from 1997 until his appointment as a Circuit Judge Pro Tem in 2019.

In 1995 Marquis received the Animal Legal Defense Fund's "Jolene Malone Aggressive Enforcement Award" in recognition of his work on a particularly difficult animal abuse case and in 2006 was the recipient of the Association of Government Attorneys in Capital Litigation's William J. Schaefer Award.

In 2014 Marquis was named by the ALDF as one of the "Top Ten Animal Defenders".

Marquis is an outspoken prosecutor who is frequently asked to "special prosecute" conflict of interest cases for other District Attorneys. He has successfully prosecuted a Benton County lawyer, a former courtroom rival, and the 1985 case in which Marquis defeated famed defense attorney Gerry Spence when Michael Jones was convicted (later overturned), which became the subject of Spence's 2003 book, The Smoking Gun. On January 28, 1986, when Judge Haas took over the case of Sandra Jones (Michael Jones' mother) from several other judges, the entire Lincoln County D.A.'s Office – including Marquis – was disqualified by the judge, Harl H. Haas, Jr., with Marquis then filing a judicial fitness complaint.

In April 2026 Marquis came out of retirement to work in the Linn County District Attorney's Office in Albany, Oregon as a Special Deputy District Attorney. He will be training younger prosecutors and handling murder cases.

== See also ==
- Oregon Department of Justice
