= Phil Keisling =

American politician

Secretary of State of Oregon
- In office January 14, 1991 – November 8, 1999
- Governor: Barbara Roberts; John Kitzhaber
- Preceded by: Barbara Roberts
- Succeeded by: Bill Bradbury

Member of the Oregon House of Representatives from the 12th district
- In office 1989–1991
- Preceded by: Richard S. Springer
- Succeeded by: Gail Shibley

Personal details
- Born: June 23, 1955 (age 71)
- Party: Democratic
- Education: Yale University
- Occupation: Director of the Center for Public Service at Portland State University

Phil Keisling (born June 23, 1955) is an American politician and business executive in the U.S. state of Oregon. He served as Oregon Secretary of State from 1991 to 1999 and previously served in the Oregon House of Representatives. He is known for having championed the state's vote-by-mail system.

Keisling is the retired Director of the Center for Public Service, located in the Mark O. Hatfield School of Government at Portland State University. Keisling oversaw more than a dozen separate programs serving local, state, federal government, and international organizations in the U.S. and several countries (including Japan, Vietnam, South Korea, and China).

== Background and career ==
Keisling was born in Oregon and graduated from Sunset High School, then located in an unincorporated area of Washington County, in 1973. He graduated from Yale University in 1977 and pursued a career in journalism, first as a writer for Willamette Week in Portland, Oregon from 1978–1981, and then as an editor at Washington Monthly in Washington, D.C. from 1982–1984.

From 2000 to 2009, Keisling was a Senior Vice President for Marketing for the Oregon high tech company CorSource Technology Group, Inc. (formerly Hepieric, Inc.), has remained involved in politics and civic affairs since leaving office, serving on a variety of local, statewide and national committees, commissions and organizations, both inside and outside of government.

In 2010, Keisling joined a new statewide trade association, Smart Grid Oregon, as its Board Chairman. The organization has been created to enable, promote and grow the smart grid industry and infrastructure in the State of Oregon.

He accepted appointment in 1998 to the Performance Audit Implementation Steering Committee of the Portland Public Schools, which guided the financially troubled district through comprehensive reform in response to an independent performance audit.

When a proposal came before the Oregon State Legislature in 2003 transfer responsibility for audits of state agencies and programs from the Audit Division of the Secretary of State to the Legislature, Keisling joined with four other former Secretaries of States of both parties, Mark Hatfield, Clay Myers, Norma Paulus, and Barbara Roberts, to publicly denounce the move.

Keisling is a chief proponent of open primaries in Oregon, contributing to and later promoting a 2004 white paper sponsored by the non-partisan Oregon Progress Forum. The Public Commission on the Oregon Legislature included open primaries among its sweeping proposals for reforms to the legislature. Keisling and Paulus, a Republican, headed an initiative petition signature drive to place the issue on the 2006 ballot. Of the 91,401 petition signatures submitted, only 67% were determined to be valid, and the measure did not make it to a vote. They tried again in 2008, successfully placing Measure 65 on the ballot, which failed to pass, retaining the closed primaries.

A longtime supporter of open government, Keisling previously served on the Board of Open Oregon, a statewide advocacy and watchdog organization involved in Oregon Public Meeting Law (Sunshine Law) enforcement, and other government secrecy issues. He is also a co-founder and board member of the Oregon Public Affairs Network (OPAN), roughly based on the C-SPAN television model.

== See also ==
- The Oregon Channel

Political offices
Preceded by Barbara Roberts	Secretary of State of Oregon; 1991-1999	Succeeded by Bill Bradbury
