= 1990 Oregon gubernatorial election =

- November 7, 1990
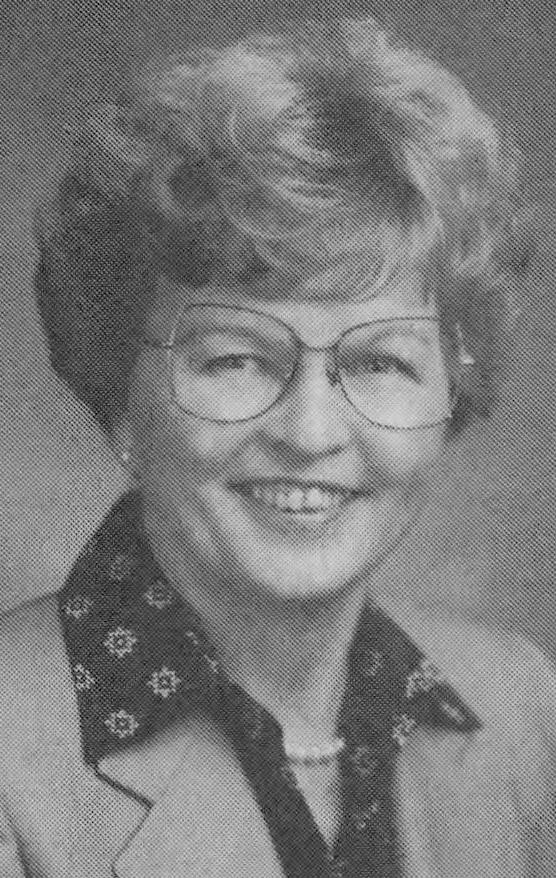

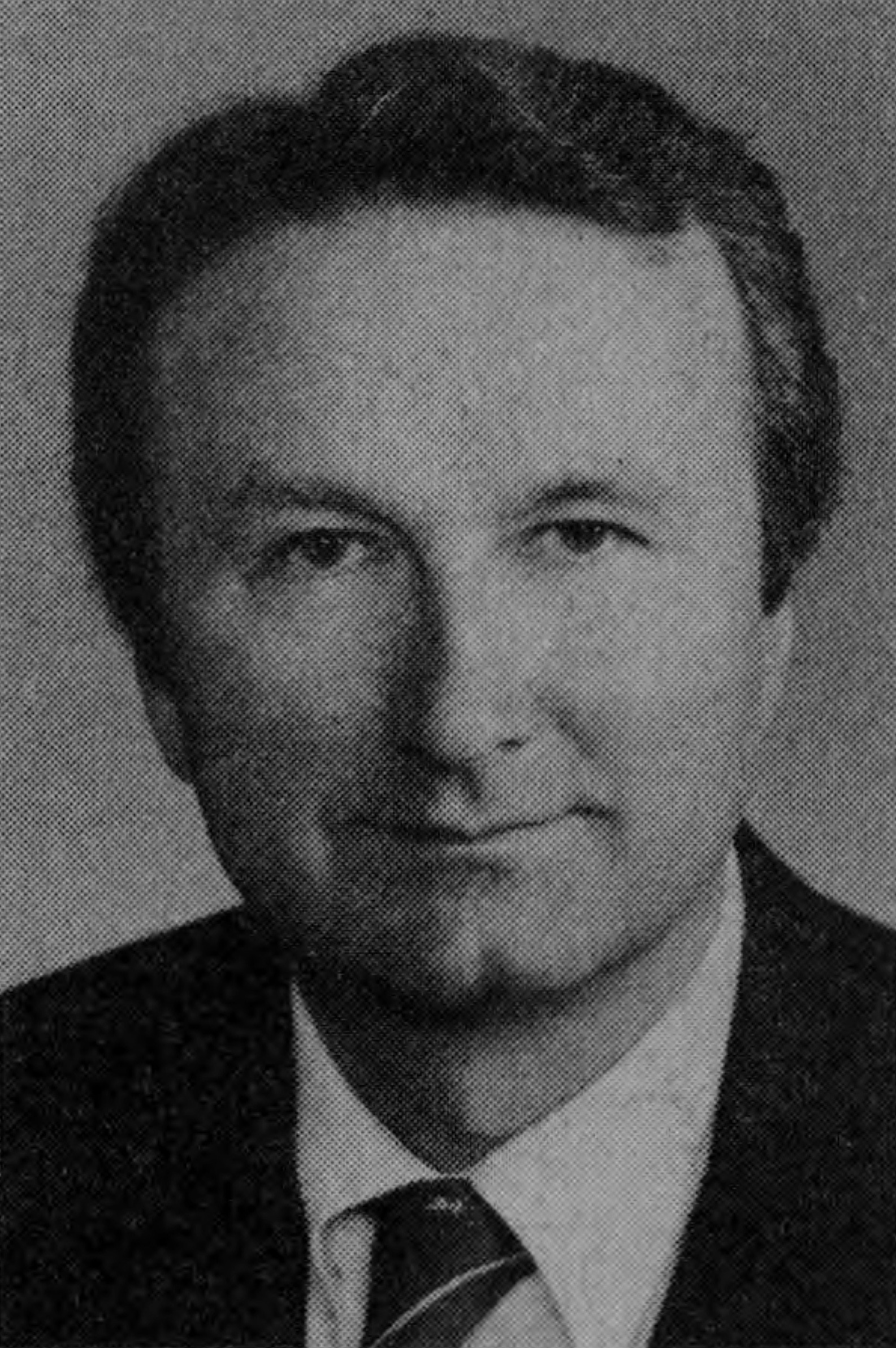

Nominee	Barbara Roberts	Dave Frohnmayer	Al Mobley
Party	Democratic	Republican	Independent
Popular vote	508,749	444,646	144,062
Percentage	45.72%	39.96%	12.95%
- County results Roberts: 40–50% 50–60% Frohnmayer: 30–40% 40–50% 50–60%
Governor before election
Neil Goldschmidt
Democratic
Elected Governor
Barbara Roberts
Democratic

The 1990 Oregon gubernatorial election took place on November 7, 1990. Democratic nominee Barbara Roberts defeated Republican David B. Frohnmayer and Independent Al Mobley to win the election.

== Primary election ==
Oregon held primary elections on May 15, 1990.

=== Democratic party ===
==== Candidates ====
- Barbara Roberts, Oregon Secretary of State

==== Results ====
Democratic primary results
Party	Candidate	Votes	%
Democratic	Barbara Roberts	251,838	98.36%
Democratic	Scattering	4,194	1.63%
Total votes		256,032	100.00%

=== Republican party ===
==== Candidates ====
- Sanford Blau
- Ed Christie
- Dave Frohnmayer, Oregon Attorney General
- Terry Hutchison
- John Lim, businessman
- William Sparks
- Edward Thomas Steubs, insurance agent

==== Results ====
Republican primary results
Party	Candidate	Votes	%
Republican	Dave Frohnmayer	227,867	79.11%
Republican	John Lim	32,397	11.25%
Republican	Ed Christie	8,285	2.88%
Republican	Terry Hutchison	7,412	2.57%
Republican	Edward Thomas Steubs	4,847	1.68%
Republican	William Sparks	2,906	0.86%
Republican	Sanford Blau	2,006	0.70%
Republican	Scattering	2,760	0.96%
Total votes		288,040	100.00%

== General election ==
=== Candidates ===
- Barbara Roberts, Democratic
- Dave Frohnmayer, Republican
- Al Mobley, Independent, social conservative activist
- Fred Oerther, Libertarian

=== Debates ===
1990 Oregon gubernatorial election debates
No.	Date	Host	Moderator	Link	Democratic	Republican	Independent	Libertarian
Key: P Participant A Absent N Not invited I Invited W Withdrawn								
Key: P Participant A Absent N Not invited I Invited W Withdrawn					Barbara Roberts	David Frohnmayer	Al Mobley	Fred Oerther
1				YouTube	P	P	N	N
2		League of Women Voters of Oregon; Oregon Corrections Association		YouTube	P	P	P	P

=== Polling ===
Source	Date	Sample size	Margin of error	Barbara Roberts (D)	Dave Frohnmayer (R)	Others	Undecided
The Oregonian		600	± 4.0%	38%	45%	7%	10%

=== Results ===
Oregon 1990 gubernatorial election
Party	Candidate	Votes	%	±%
Democratic	Barbara Roberts	508,749	45.72%	−6.14%
Republican	Dave Frohnmayer	444,646	39.96%	−7.89%
Independent	Al Mobley	144,062	12.95%	
Libertarian	Fred Oerther	14,583	1.31%	
Write-in	Scattering	807	0.07%	
Total votes		1,112,847	100.00%	
Plurality		64,103	5.76%	
Democratic hold		Swing	+1.75%	

=== Results by county ===
Roberts was the first Democrat to be elected governor without carrying Baker County and Linn County.

County	Barbara Roberts Democratic		Dave Frohnmayer Republican		Al Mobley Independent		Fred Oerther Libertarian		Scattering Write-in		Margin		Total votes cast
County	#	%	#	%	#	%	#	%	#	%	#	%	Total votes cast
Baker	2,080	34.16%	2,947	48.40%	968	15.90%	87	1.43%	7	0.11%	-867	-14.24%	6,089
Benton	12,961	44.07%	12,084	41.08%	3,832	13.03%	529	1.80%	7	0.02%	877	2.98%	29,413
Clackamas	56,674	47.93%	47,470	40.15%	12,650	10.70%	1,415	1.20%	22	0.02%	9,204	7.78%	118,231
Clatsop	6,442	49.96%	4,551	35.29%	1,717	13.32%	183	1.42%	2	0.02%	1,891	14.66%	12,895
Columbia	6,142	39.65%	6,249	40.34%	2,854	18.43%	210	1.36%	34	0.22%	-107	-0.69%	15,489
Coos	10,023	44.38%	8,795	38.95%	3,406	15.08%	313	1.39%	46	0.20%	1,228	5.44%	22,583
Crook	1,859	34.70%	2,924	54.57%	541	10.10%	34	0.63%	0	0.00%	-1,065	-19.88%	5,358
Curry	3,168	38.78%	3,940	48.23%	926	11.34%	118	1.44%	17	0.21%	-772	-9.45%	8,169
Deschutes	11,236	38.33%	14,082	48.04%	3,550	12.11%	437	1.49%	9	0.03%	-2,846	-9.71%	29,314
Douglas	10,578	30.69%	15,928	46.22%	7,476	21.69%	477	1.38%	3	0.01%	-5,350	-15.52%	34,462
Gilliam	339	39.56%	366	42.71%	144	16.80%	8	0.93%	0	0.00%	-27	-3.15%	857
Grant	894	28.07%	1,286	40.38%	933	29.29%	69	2.17%	3	0.09%	-353 (Note: Frohnmayer's margin over Mobley)	-11.09%	3,185
Harney	863	29.35%	1,516	51.56%	533	18.13%	27	0.92%	1	0.03%	-653	-22.21%	2,940
Hood River	2,542	41.94%	2,627	43.34%	810	13.36%	82	1.35%	0	0.00%	-85	-1.40%	6,061
Jackson	20,383	36.39%	26,347	47.04%	8,534	15.24%	738	1.32%	10	0.02%	-5,964	-10.65%	56,012
Jefferson	1,716	39.24%	2,238	51.18%	382	8.74%	37	0.85%	0	0.00%	-522	-11.94%	4,373
Josephine	8,244	34.44%	11,974	50.02%	3,363	14.05%	355	1.48%	3	0.01%	-3,730	-15.58%	23,939
Klamath	6,118	30.30%	11,183	55.39%	2,649	13.12%	238	1.18%	1	0.00%	-5,065	-25.09%	20,189
Lake	836	26.95%	1,633	52.64%	606	19.54%	27	0.87%	0	0.00%	-797	-25.69%	3,102
Lane	49,814	45.18%	45,107	40.91%	13,773	12.49%	1,544	1.40%	25	0.02%	4,707	4.27%	110,263
Lincoln	8,503	52.28%	5,264	32.37%	2,220	13.65%	274	1.68%	3	0.02%	3,239	19.92%	16,264
Linn	11,626	33.88%	14,314	41.71%	8,019	23.37%	352	1.03%	3	0.01%	-2,688	-7.83%	34,314
Malheur	2,200	26.98%	3,925	48.14%	1,916	23.50%	111	1.36%	2	0.02%	-1,725	-21.16%	8,154
Marion	33,765	39.59%	35,498	41.62%	15,066	17.66%	812	0.95%	150	0.18%	-1,733	-2.03%	85,291
Morrow	1,013	39.63%	1,062	41.55%	450	17.61%	31	1.21%	0	0.00%	-49	-1.92%	2,556
Multnomah	142,804	59.38%	75,738	31.49%	18,212	7.57%	3,388	1.41%	367	0.15%	67,066	27.89%	240,509
Polk	7,824	38.25%	8,121	39.70%	4,266	20.85%	239	1.17%	7	0.03%	-297	-1.45%	20,457
Sherman	391	37.81%	492	47.58%	138	13.35%	13	1.26%	0	0.00%	-101	-9.77%	1,034
Tillamook	4,683	49.07%	3,506	36.74%	1,221	12.79%	126	1.32%	7	0.07%	1,177	12.33%	9,543
Umatilla	6,436	40.41%	6,615	41.54%	2,596	16.30%	279	1.75%	0	0.00%	-179	-1.12%	15,926
Union	3,399	38.08%	3,714	41.61%	1,690	18.94%	117	1.31%	5	0.06%	-315	-3.53%	8,925
Wallowa	983	29.70%	1,199	36.22%	1,075	32.48%	52	1.57%	1	0.03%	-124	-3.74%	3,310
Wasco	3,948	44.37%	3,488	39.20%	1,366	15.35%	96	1.08%	0	0.00%	460	5.17%	8,898
Washington	57,815	48.08%	49,340	41.04%	11,601	9.65%	1,454	1.21%	27	0.02%	8,475	7.05%	120,237
Wheeler	189	28.85%	332	50.69%	124	18.93%	10	1.53%	0	0.00%	-143	-21.83%	655
Yamhill	10,258	43.01%	8,791	36.86%	4,455	18.68%	301	1.26%	45	0.19%	1,467	6.15%	23,850
Total	508,749	45.72%	444,646	39.96%	144,062	12.95%	14,583	1.31%	807	0.07%	64,103	5.76%	1,112,847

==== Counties that flipped from Republican to Democratic ====
- Clackamas
- Wasco
- Washington

==== Counties that flipped from Democratic to Republican ====
- Baker
- Columbia
- Linn
- Marion
- Polk
- Union
