= Harl H. Haas Jr. =

American politician (1932–2013)

Judge of the Multnomah County Circuit Court
- In office 1985–2001
- Constituency: Multnomah County

Member of the Oregon State Senate
- In office 1971–1972

Member of the Oregon House of Representatives
- In office 1969–1971

Personal details
- Born: December 24, 1932 Cape Girardeau, Missouri
- Died: September 21, 2013 (aged 80) Portland, Oregon
- Party: Democratic
- Education: University of Montana; Southeast Missouri State University; Willamette University College of Law
- Occupation: Attorney

Harl H. Haas Jr. (December 24, 1932 – September 21, 2013) was an American politician and jurist in Oregon. A native of Missouri, he served in both chambers of the Oregon Legislative Assembly as a Democrat before serving as a district attorney and Oregon Circuit Courts judge.

== Early life ==
Haas was born in Cape Girardeau, Missouri, on December 24, 1932, to Harl Henry Haas and Berenice Taylor. After his parents divorced when he was two years old, Haas was raised by his mother. He enrolled at Southeast Missouri State University in his hometown and spent a year at the school before dropping out and moving to Montana. After serving for two years in the United States Army he returned to college and also attended the University of Montana in Missoula. He also helped his girlfriend babysit a young Rush Limbaugh. In 1958, he enrolled at Willamette University College of Law in Salem, Oregon, where he graduated in 1961 with honors. That year he passed the Oregon Bar. He first married Sharron Haas, then Mary Lou Calvin, and had two daughters, Holly and Amy.

== Political career ==
After starting in private legal practice, he ran for a seat in the Oregon House of Representatives in 1968 as a Democrat. He won the election and represented Portland in District 6. Haas won re-election in 1970, but resigned on May 11, 1971, when he was appointed to replace Ted Hallock in the Oregon State Senate in District 12.

In 1972, Haas ran for district attorney of Multnomah County and won, and then won a second four-year term in 1976. As DA he started an assistance program for rape victims in 1974, the first of its type in the country. He later established a restitution program and a crime-victims assistance program, both firsts in Oregon. Haas was convicted of driving under the influence in Sacramento, California, in 1977 while still a DA.

At the end of Haas' second term he ran for Oregon Attorney General, losing to David B. Frohnmayer in the 1980 election. In 1984, he won election to a seat on the Multnomah County Circuit Court, and replaced John J. Murchison in January 1985. Haas' most notable case on the bench came in 1985 with the murder trial of Sandra Jones that was removed from Lincoln County and had Gerry Spence as the attorney for the defendant. During the trial he disqualified prosecutor Joshua Marquis from the trial. While on the bench he started a drug court program in 1991 before retiring from the court in 2001.

== Later life and death ==
Harl Haas died at the age of 80 on September 21, 2013, from lung cancer at home in Portland.
