= Bob Stacey =

Oregon attorney (c. 1950 – 2022)

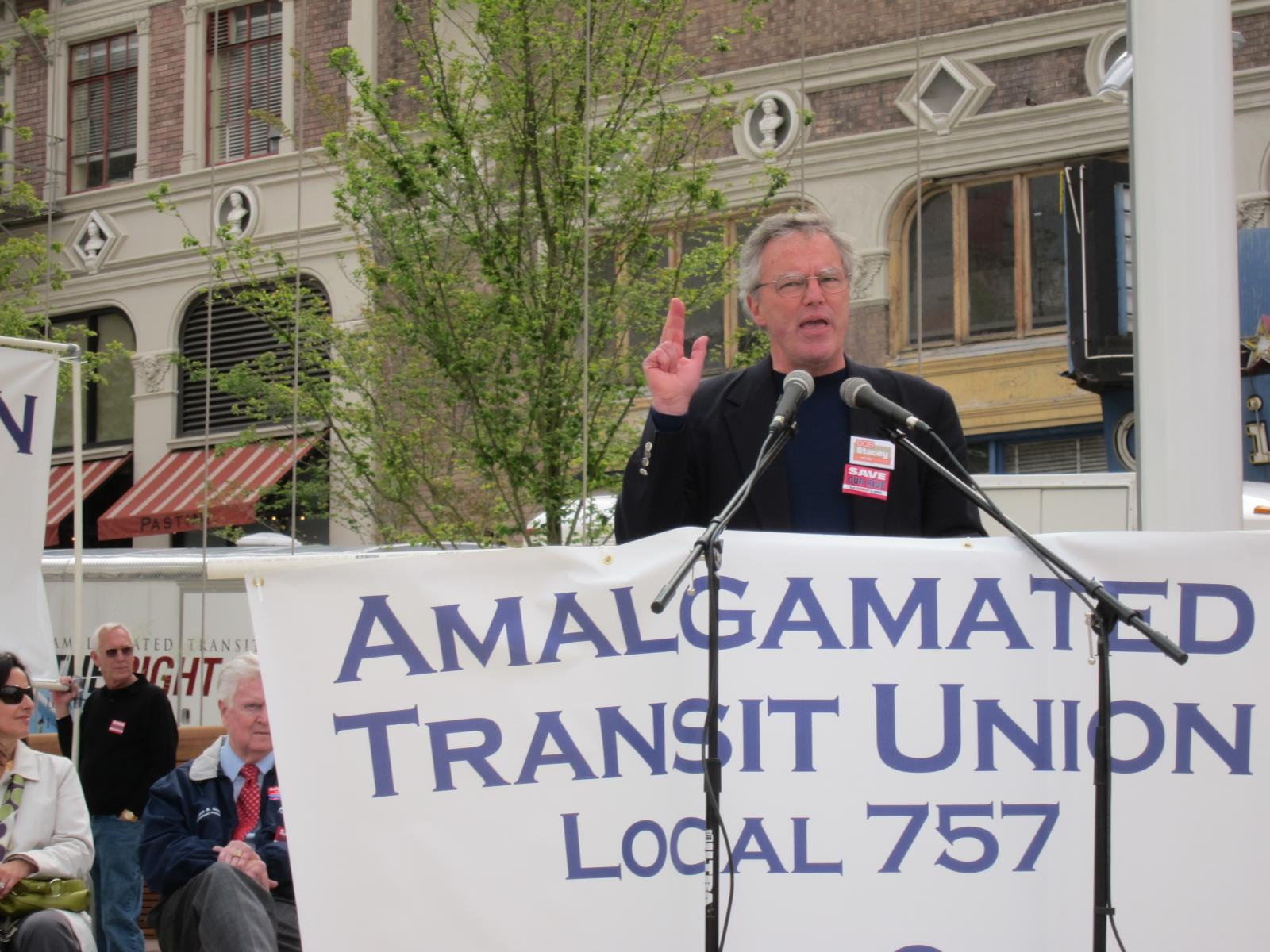
- Stacey speaking in 2010

Metro Councilor from the 6th district
- In office January 7, 2013 – October 15, 2021
- Preceded by: Barbara Roberts
- Succeeded by: Duncan Hwang

Personal details
- Born: Robert Eugene Stacey Jr. 1950 Portland, Oregon
- Died: September 8, 2022 (aged 72) Portland, Oregon

Robert Eugene Stacey Jr. (c. 1950 – September 8, 2022) was an Oregon attorney and leader in land-use and transportation planning. He served as an elected councillor at Metro, the regional government in the Portland metropolitan area, from 2013 to 2021. On his death, Congressman Earl Blumenauer stated that "Oregon just lost the most important person that most people have never heard of". In a number of roles in state and local government, Stacey was instrumental in defining land-use law and policy within the state of Oregon.

== Early life ==
A native of Portland, he graduated from Parkrose High School. He later earned a Bachelor's in political science from Reed College and a law degree from University of Oregon.

== Early work in land-use planning ==
In the 1970s, Stacey was one of the original staff attorneys of 1000 Friends of Oregon, founded after the Oregon Land Conservation and Development Act of 1973 to advocate for state-wide land-use planning. During this time, he was instrumental in arguing in favor of land-use planning law such as the new urban growth boundary system to preserve farmland and combat suburban sprawl.

Stacey also participated in legal action against Rajneeshpuram, which resulted in a suspected poisoning attempt against him and 1000 Friends of Oregon staff during the same period that Rajneeshees perpetrated a 1984 bioterror attack and 1985 assassination plot.

== Political career ==
Stacey later served as chief of staff to Earl Blumenauer during Blumenauer's time on the Portland City Council and subsequently in Congress, as well as serving as a senior policy advisor to Governor Barbara Roberts. He also was executive director of policy and planning for TriMet, the Portland area's regional transit agency. Stacey went on to lead 1000 Friends of Oregon as executive director from 2002 to 2009.

In 2012, Stacey was elected to Metro regional government, a planning body for the Portland metropolitan area. He stepped down from Metro in 2021 after battling meningioma.

== Legacy ==
In 2021, a pedestrian and cyclist bridge in Portland, the Gideon Overcrossing, was renamed the Bob Stacey Crossing in his honor. He died at home in Southeast Portland in 2022.
