= Bob Stacey Crossing =

Pedestrian bridge in Portland, Oregon, U.S.

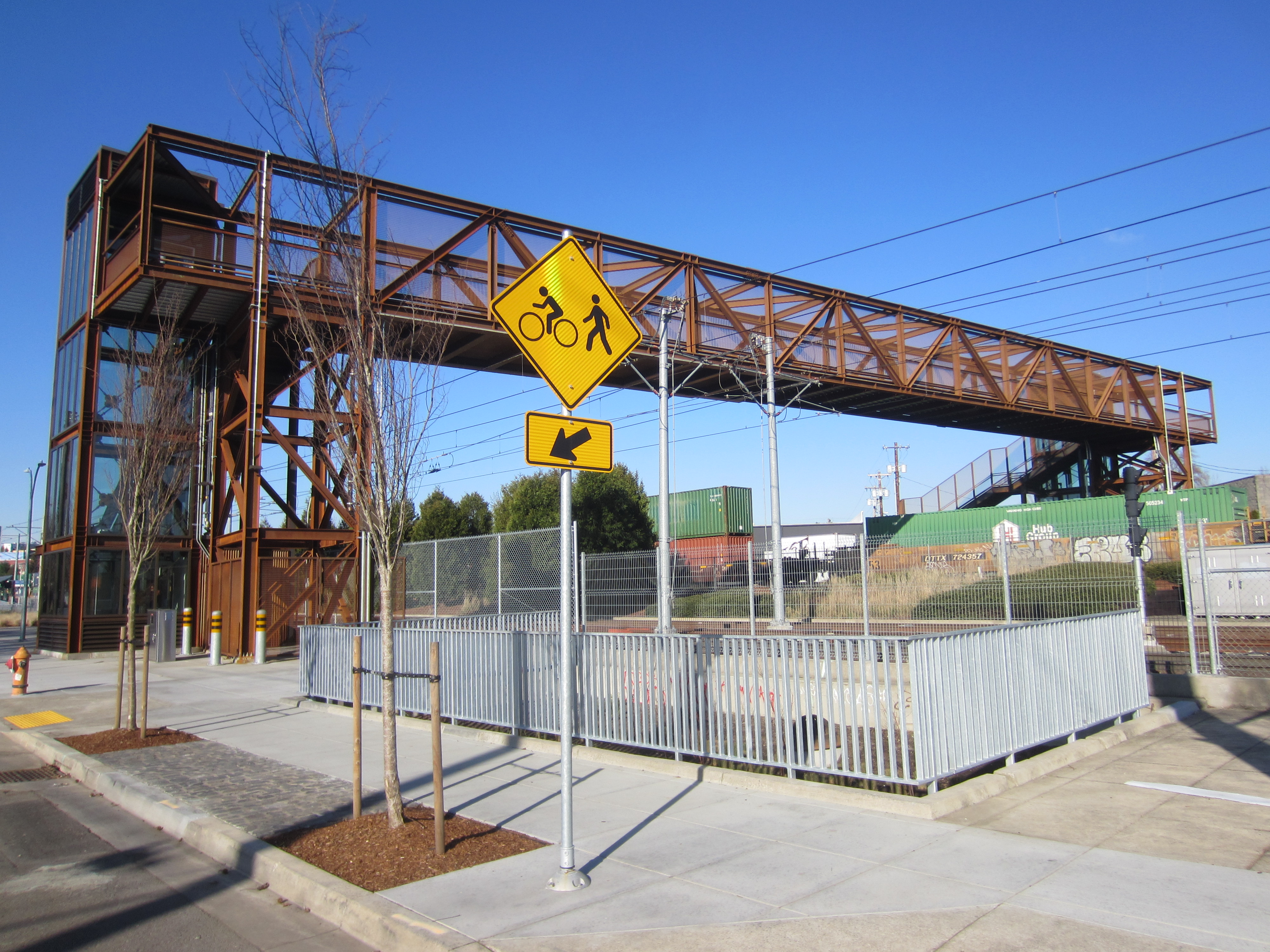
- The pedestrian bridge in 2021
- Coordinates: 45°30′7.4″N 122°39′6.5″W
- Locale: Portland, Oregon, U.S.

Bob Stacey Crossing (formerly Gideon Overcrossing) is a pedestrian bridge in southeast Portland, Oregon's Hosford-Abernethy neighborhood, in the United States. The bridge spans tracks for both Union Pacific Railroad and TriMet's MAX Light Rail. Construction on the $15 million project started in May 2019. The overcrossing opened in November 2020.

The Portland Bureau of Transportation (PBOT) renamed the bridge Bob Stacey Crossing in 2021 in honor of Bob Stacey.
