= Del Riley (clerk) =

American county clerk (1925–2018)

Del Riley (May 1925 – August 23, 2018) was an American county clerk. He was elected to serve Linn County, Oregon from 1967 to 1987, and advocated for and implemented the early stages of Oregon's vote-by-mail system, which was eventually expanded to 100% of votes cast in all elections in the state. In early life, he served in World War II, and was a Purple Heart recipient.

== Personal life ==
Riley was born in Montana, US, in May 1925, and grew up both there as well as in Alberta, Canada. In World War II, he enlisted in the US Army's 10th Mountain Division, arriving in Naples, Italy, aboard the USS West Point in January 1945. While a part of a scouting party he was wounded by shrapnel from a trip-wire explosive. Evacuation was delayed owing to their position behind enemy lines. Riley earned a Purple Heart for the incident. In 1952, Riley married Patricia. They have three children, one of whom went on to public service in Linn County as well, serving as sheriff. Riley and his wife were active in The Gideons International. Riley died on August 23, 2018, at age 93.

== Linn County clerk ==
Riley was first elected in 1966, assuming office in early 1967. He was succeeded in office by Steve Druckenmiller, who still holds the position as of 2021.

=== Vote-by-mail advocacy ===
While studying ways to reduce the cost of running elections in Linn County and ways to increase voter participation, Riley identified sample ballots. Every election, he was required by law to mail every voter in the county a sample ballot showing them what their ballots would have on them. Instead of mailing sample ballots, Riley began to advocate for simply mailing the actual ballots to voters and having them mailed back. In early 1981, Riley and the Oregon Secretary of State Norma Paulus visited San Diego County in California to observe an experimental local election by mail taking place there. Upon his return he began pressing the Oregon Legislature to allow him to run a test of the system in his county. They passed a bill allowing a two-year trial run, and Riley implemented mail-in voting in time for a special election. Secretary of State Paulus stated before the election, "We're very confident Mr. Riley will be able to pull this off. That's why we chose Linn County. We all know if it doesn't work here we won't get another chance at it." Voter participation reached 77 percent in an off-year election, the highest turnout recorded in the district. By Riley's second mail election, in 1982, participation had increased to 92.5 percent.

By the mid-1980s, more counties in Oregon began adopting the vote-by-mail model. In 1987, the Oregon Legislature authorized all counties in the state to conduct local elections by mail if they chose. According to a 1988 study, the number of local elections that had been conducted entirely by mail in the US was 1000, and Oregon—a small state in terms of population—accounted for 400 of them.

In 1998, Oregon put to voters a measure requiring all elections to be conducted by mail. Riley was supportive of the measure, and it passed with nearly 70% of the vote.

=== Further legacy ===
In 2015, giving a speech on a recently passed bill to automatically register Oregon residents to vote when issuing a driver's license, Governor Kate Brown explicitly tied the push to the legacy of Riley, declaring "He had a vision to make voting as convenient and as accessible as possible by putting a ballot in the hands of every eligible Oregonian." Five years later reflecting on the 100th anniversary of women gaining the right to vote Governor Brown again echoed the sentiment that Riley's legacy was tied to the franchise, stating "In fact, it was Linn County clerk Del Riley whose vision it was to put a ballot in the hands of every single eligible Oregonian."
