= Vote-by-mail in Oregon =

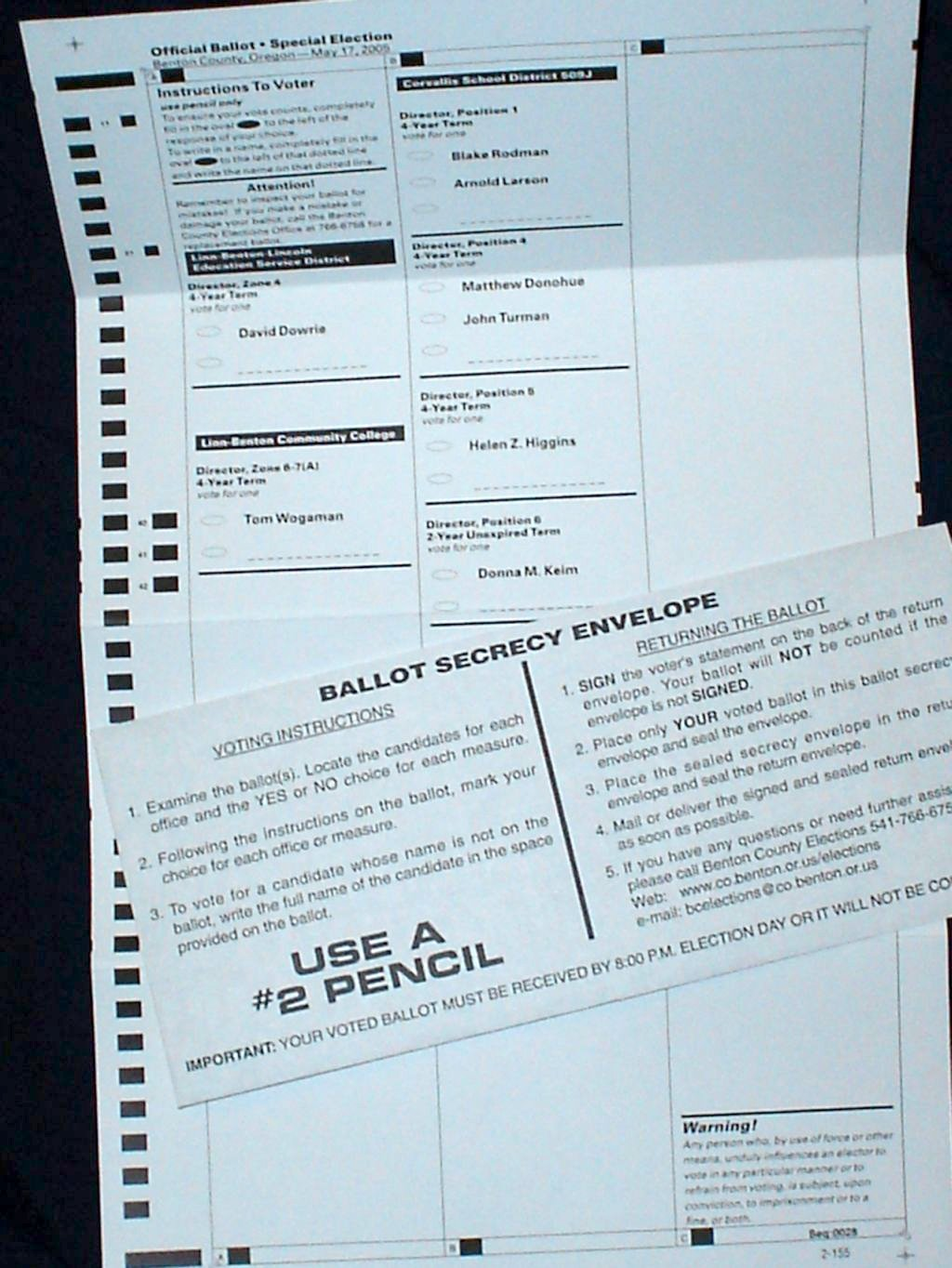
Vote-by-mail ballot from a 2006 special election

The U.S. state of Oregon established vote-by-mail as the standard mechanism for voting with 1998 Oregon Ballot Measure 60, a citizen's initiative. The measure made Oregon the first state in the United States to conduct its elections exclusively by mail. The measure passed on November 3, 1998, by a margin of 69.4% to 30.6%. Political scientists say Oregon's vote by mail system contributes to its highest-in-the-nation rate of voter turnout, at 61.5% of eligible voters.

== History of postal voting in Oregon ==
Vote-by-mail had already been implemented to a lesser degree in Oregon:

- 1981 The Oregon Legislative Assembly approves vote-by-mail for local elections, at the discretion of the county; at least one polling place in the county had to remain open on election day. The move came after efforts by Del Riley, Linn County Clerk.
- 1987 Vote-by-mail becomes permanent, with the majority of Oregon's counties making use of it.
- 1989 A House bill to extend vote-by-mail to include the 1990 primary elections was defeated in a 33–27, non-party-line vote.
- 1992 Governor's Task Force on Local Government Services identifies statewide vote-by-mail as one of the most significant opportunities to save money on conducting elections.
- 1995 Oregon becomes the first state to conduct a federal primary election totally by mail.
- 1996 U.S. Senator Ron Wyden is elected by mail with a 66% turnout, succeeding Bob Packwood.
- 1998 Oregon Ballot Measure 60 is passed with 69.4% support, mandating vote-by-mail for primary and general elections.
- 2000 Oregon becomes the first state in the nation to conduct a presidential election entirely by mail. About 80% of registered voters participated.
- 2019 Oregon becomes the first state not to require paid postage on ballot return envelopes.

Measure 60 eliminated restrictions on vote-by-mail and established it as the single form of voting for elections in Oregon. It also required vote-by-mail to be used for biennial primaries and general elections as well as eliminating polling places.

Ballot Measure 60 results by county:

County	Yes	Votes	No	Votes	Total
Baker	66.12	4,097	33.88	2,099	6,196
Benton	64.35	18,271	35.65	10,123	28,394
Clackamas	71.40	80,103	28.60	32,080	112,183
Clatsop	69.87	8,855	30.13	3,819	12,674
Columbia	70.39	11,653	29.61	4,902	16,555
Coos	62.92	14,930	37.08	8,800	23,730
Crook	71.09	3,860	28.91	1,570	5,430
Curry	65.55	5,843	34.45	3,071	8,914
Deschutes	76.27	29,554	23.73	9,196	38,750
Douglas	64.04	22,921	35.96	12,870	35,791
Gilliam	71.01	556	28.99	227	783
Grant	61.17	1,840	38.83	1,168	3,008
Harney	60.36	1,626	39.64	1,068	2,694
Hood River	64.89	3,742	35.11	2,024	5,766
Jackson	70.65	40,620	29.35	16,875	57,495
Jefferson	70.14	3,504	29.86	1,492	4,996
Josephine	67.86	18,169	32.14	8,605	26,774
Klamath	62.90	11,560	37.10	6,817	18,377
Lake	70.71	2,165	29.29	897	3,062
Lane	64.88	71,539	35.12	38,727	110,266
Lincoln	75.32	13,009	24.68	4,262	17,271
Linn	60.43	19,785	39.57	12,958	32,743
Malheur	60.98	4,473	39.02	2,862	7,335
Marion	71.26	61,373	28.74	24,748	86,121
Morrow	63.92	1,644	36.08	928	2,572
Multnomah	71.86	146,899	28.14	57,534	204,433
Polk	63.16	13,135	36.84	7,663	20,798
Sherman	63.16	535	36.84	312	847
Tillamook	72.76	7,248	27.24	2,714	9,962
Umatilla	66.27	9,456	33.73	4,812	14,268
Union	69.78	6,054	30.22	2,622	8,676
Wallowa	62.92	1,980	37.08	1,167	3,147
Wasco	74.60	6,215	25.40	2,116	8,331
Washington	72.58	91,368	27.42	34,523	125,891
Wheeler	67.94	464	32.06	219	683
Yamhill	69.02	18,158	30.98	8,151	26,309

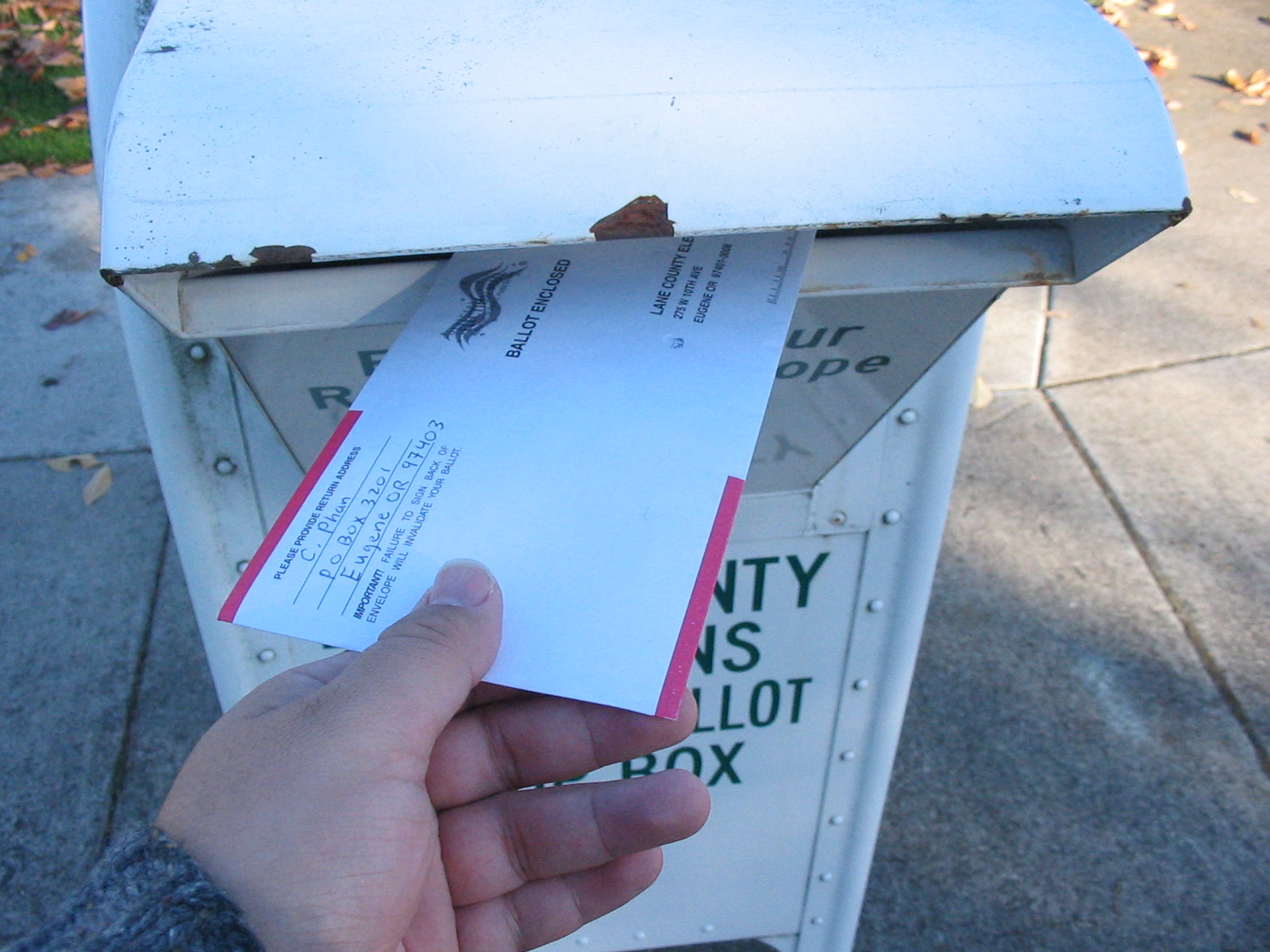
In addition to being returned by mail, ballots may be deposited in special ballot return boxes. Using these boxes does not require postage, and allows citizens to vote until 8:00 pm on election day.

== Supporters ==
Organizations which supported the initiative included the League of Women Voters of Oregon, the Oregon League of Conservation Voters, AARP of Oregon, and Oregon Education Association. Individuals who supported the measure included then-Governor John Kitzhaber, Oregon Secretary of State Phil Keisling, and former U.S. Senator Mark Hatfield. Supporters of the measure asserted that it would increase voter participation and make elections more convenient for voters. The State of Oregon would also save an estimated $3 million a year, in years which a primary and general election occur.

== Opponents ==
Notable opposition to the measure included State Representative Lynn Snodgrass and anti-tax activist Bill Sizemore. Opponents claimed the system would invite election fraud as well as the possibility of people pressuring each other in terms of how they vote.

== Lasting popularity ==
Vote-by-mail in Oregon has maintained a high level of support since it was passed in 1998. A survey done in 2003 by Dr. Priscilla Southwell, a professor of Political Science at University of Oregon, shows that 81% of respondents favored the vote-by-mail system while 19% favored traditional voting at poll booths. The poll also shows high favorability among registered Democrats (85%) and registered Republicans (76%) alike. Thirty percent of respondents said they voted more often since vote-by-mail was enacted.

== See also ==
- Elections in Oregon
- List of Oregon ballot measures
