= Oregon Channel =

Former public affairs television network in Oregon

- Type: Cable network
- Country: United States
- Availability: Oregon
- Owner: Oregon Legislative Assembly; Oregon University System
- Launch date: 2007
- Dissolved: 2011
- Official website: www.oregonchannel.org

The Oregon Channel was a public affairs television network in the U.S. state of Oregon. It was operated by a consortium consisting of Oregon Public Broadcasting, Southern Oregon Public Television, the Oregon Legislative Assembly, the Oregon University System and the Oregon Public Affairs Network (OPAN). It was carried on most cable television systems throughout Oregon either on a part-time or full-time basis as well as on the Internet. The station operated 24 hours a day.

== Programming ==
When the State Legislature was in session live gavel-to-gavel coverage of the Oregon State Senate and the Oregon House of Representatives was carried until adjournment sine die.

When the legislature was not in session other live gavel-to-gavel programming was carried, including the Oregon Supreme Court, and meetings of the Governor and cabinet members. When no live gavel-to-gavel meetings were underway, other local or statewide public affairs programming was carried.

== Demise ==
Officials at the Oregon State Capitol planned to discontinue the broadcast of the Oregon Channel after the 2011 session, concluding that the channel's viewership had dropped too low to justify costs. Both the lack of interest from local Salem/Portland-area Public, educational, and government access (PEG) cable television channels and the failure of broadcasters to produce a reasonable agreement for transmission to other Government-access television (GATV) channels across Oregon ended the service.

Video of all legislative hearings and floor sessions continues to be streamed live on the legislature's website.

== See also ==
- Phil Keisling
