= Death Without Denial Grief Without Apology =

2002 book by Barbara Roberts

- Author: Barbara K. Roberts
- Subject: Death and dying
- Publisher: New Sage
- Publication date: January 2002
- Media type: trade paper
- Pages: 100
- ISBN: 0-939165-43-0
- OCLC: 48515581
- Dewey Decimal: 155.9/37 21
- LC Class: BF789.D4 R58 2002

Death Without Denial Grief Without Apology: A Guide for Facing Death and Loss by former Oregon Governor Barbara K. Roberts is a personal narrative of the author's experiences during her husband, Frank's battle with cancer, the final year of his life, and the subsequent years of grieving.

At the time of Frank Roberts' fatal recurrence of the illness, both he and his wife were in public office, Barbara as governor, and Frank as state senator. They turned to hospice for guidance and assistance once Frank decided to stop medical intervention.

Touching on matters of life with terminal illness, death with dignity, and both the personal and societal issues surrounding death, chapter titles include "A Culture in Denial," "Hospice," and "Permission to be Weird."
