= 2008 Oregon Ballot Measure 65 =

Measure 65
- Changes general election nomination processes for major/minor party, independent candidates for most partisan offices.

Results
Choice	Votes	%
Yes	553,640	34.09%
No	1,070,580	65.91%
Total votes	1,624,220	100.00%
Registered voters/turnout		85.7%
- Results by county No 60%-70% 70%-80%

Ballot Measure 65 was an initiated state statute ballot measure for the November 4, 2008 general election ballot in the state of Oregon. If it had passed, it would have replaced the current closed primary election system for partisan offices, in which each political party nominates its own candidate for the general election. The system proposed by Measure 65 bore similarities to a blanket primary and nonpartisan blanket primary.

Under Measure 65, voters would have received the same ballot regardless of their own party registration. For each partisan position, the ballot would list all candidates, also without regard for party registration. Voters would choose one candidate, and the two candidates with the most votes would advance to the November general election. The measure would have affected chapters 188.120, 254.056 and 254.115 of the Oregon Revised Statutes, and repealed chapters 254.025 and 254.365.

Former Oregon Secretaries of State Phil Keisling and Norma Paulus were the chief petitioners in favor of the measure.

Proponents of Measure 65 argued that the closed primary unfairly excluded voters with no party affiliation, and that voters should be able to vote for any primary election candidate they wished, regardless of the party affiliation of either the voter or the candidate. Opponents of the measure countered that every voter is free to register as a member of a political party to participate in the primary, and criticized the possibility that a general election race could have two candidates from the same party.

== See also ==
- Blanket primary and nonpartisan blanket primary
- Oregon state elections, 2008
- List of Oregon ballot measures
- Washington Initiative 872 (2004)
