= David B. Frohnmayer =

American politician and academic (1940–2015)

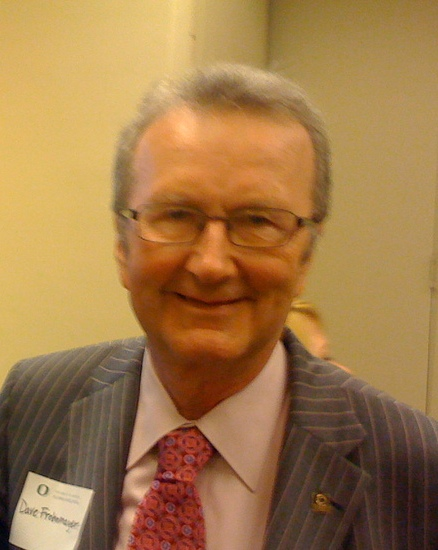

15th President of the University of Oregon
- In office July 1, 1994 – June 30, 2009
- Preceded by: Myles Brand
- Succeeded by: Richard W. Lariviere

12th Attorney General of Oregon
- In office January 5, 1981 – December 31, 1991
- Governor: Victor Atiyeh; Neil Goldschmidt; Barbara Roberts
- Preceded by: James M. Brown
- Succeeded by: Charles Crookham

Member of the Oregon House of Representatives
- In office 1975–1981

Personal details
- Born: July 9, 1940 Medford, Oregon, U.S.
- Died: March 10, 2015 (aged 74) Eugene, Oregon, U.S.
- Party: Republican
- Relatives: John Frohnmayer (brother), Mark Frohnmayer (son)
- Education: Harvard University (BA); University of California, Berkeley (JD)

David Braden Frohnmayer (July 9, 1940 – March 10, 2015) was an American attorney, politician, and academic administrator from Oregon. He was the 15th president of the University of Oregon, serving from 1994 to 2009. His tenure as president was the second-longest after John Wesley Johnson. He was the first native Oregonian to run the University of Oregon. Frohnmayer previously served as Oregon Attorney General from 1981 to 1991, and subsequently served as dean at the University of Oregon School of Law before serving as president of the university. He served in an of counsel attorney role with the Oregon law firm, Harrang Long Gary Rudnick P.C.

== Early life and education ==
David Braden Frohnmayer was born in Medford, Oregon. He graduated magna cum laude from Harvard University in 1962. He attended Wadham College, Oxford on a Rhodes Scholarship, and received his Doctor of Jurisprudence degree from the University of California, Berkeley School of Law in 1967.

== Political career ==
Frohnmayer, a Republican, served three terms in the Oregon House of Representatives from 1975 to 1981, representing southern Eugene.

=== Oregon Attorney General ===
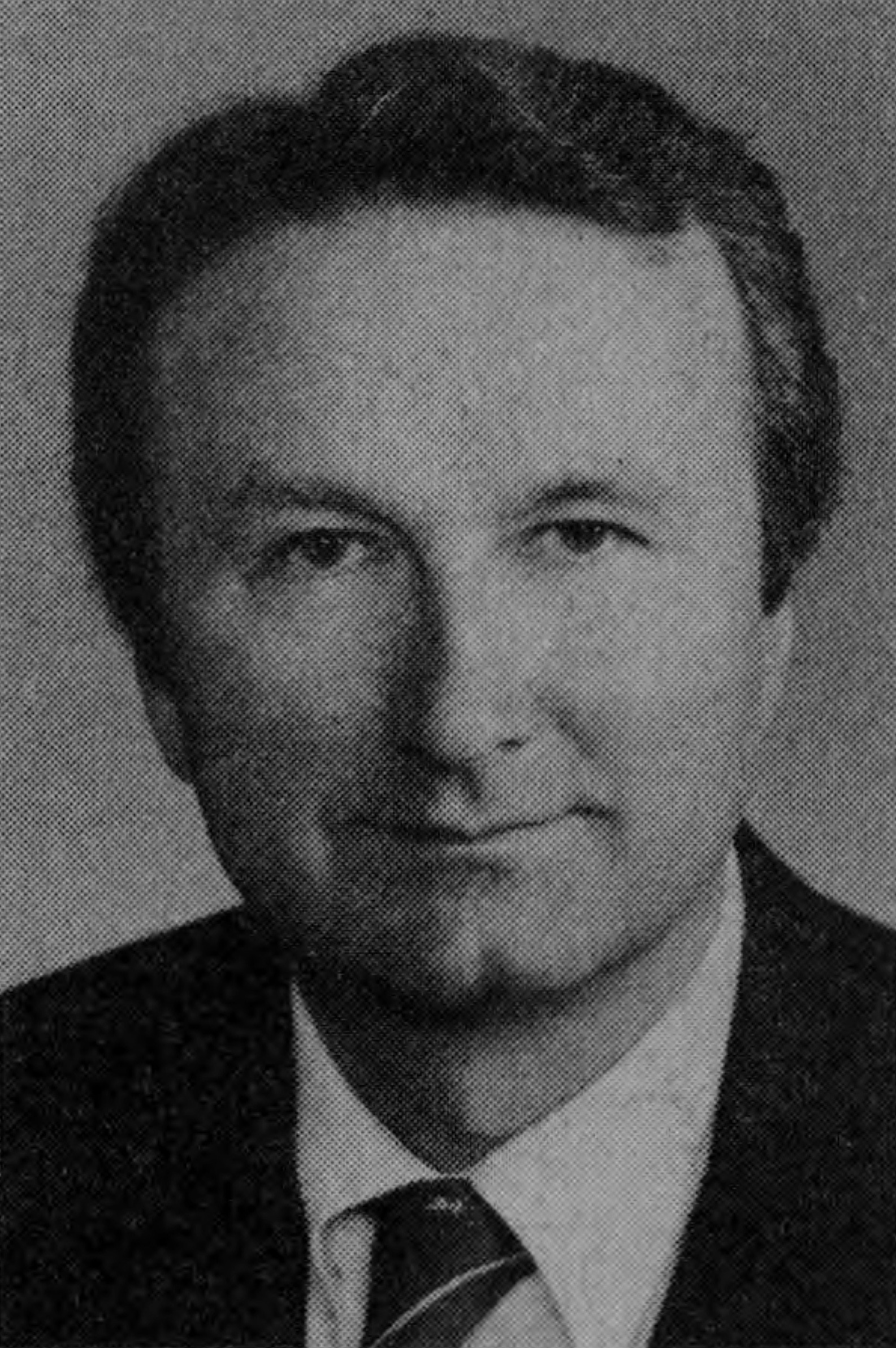
Frohnmayer in 1984

Frohnmayer was elected as Oregon Attorney General in November 1980, defeating Democrat Harl H. Haas, Jr., and was sworn into office on January 5, 1981. He was re-elected in 1984, when he defeated former State Sen. Vernon Cook (D), and 1988, when he was nominated by both the Democratic and Republican parties, and defeated Fred Oerther, the Libertarian nominee. Frohnmayer served as Attorney General until his resignation on December 31, 1991, when he became Dean of the University of Oregon School of Law. As Attorney General, one of his most notable cases involved leading the prosecution of members of the Rajneesh movement (followers of Bhagwan Shree Rajneesh.)

==== Supreme Court Litigation ====
Frohnmayer prevailed in six out of the seven cases that he took to the United States Supreme Court: Oregon v. Kennedy (1982), Oregon v. Bradshaw (1983), Oregon v. Elstad (1985), Oregon Department of Fish and Wildlife v. Klamath Indian Tribe (1985), Whitley v. Albers (1986), and Employment Division v. Smith (1990). His one unsuccessful Supreme Court case was Tower v. Glover (1984).

=== 1990 gubernatorial election ===
Frohnmayer was the Republican nominee for Governor of Oregon in 1990. Popular Democratic incumbent–and former UC Berkeley School of Law classmate–Neil Goldschmidt withdrew after Frohnmayer's campaign manager, Donna Zajonc, said "...you've got to believe that the best family will win" at a news conference, which was then reported by Jeff Mapes in The Oregonian. Zajonc's statement was interpreted at the time as a threat to use Goldschmidt's collapsing marriage as a political issue. Goldschmidt quickly withdrew from the race, an event that was considered one of the "great mysteries in Oregon politics" until 2004, when Goldschmidt admitted to having a sexual relationship with a minor in the 1970s. Frohnmayer subsequently lost the election to Barbara Roberts, the Democrat who was nominated after Goldschmidt's withdrawal, in a three-way race that included independent, Oregon Citizens Alliance-backed candidate Al Mobley.

== Academic career ==
Frohnmayer taught law at the University of Oregon from 1971 to 1981, before he became state attorney general, and returned to the university as law school dean on January 1, 1992. He was appointed president of the university in 1994. Frohnmayer announced his retirement as president on April 29, 2008, and was succeeded on July 31, 2009, by Richard Lariviere. Frohnmayer's tenure was widely acclaimed; The Register-Guard's editorial "Retiring from the University he Remade" opined that "Dave Frohnmayer has steered the University of Oregon through grim and changing times and he's leaving a different and stronger institution." The Oregonian called Frohnmayer's presidency "one of the most remarkable higher education performances in Oregon history."

During his tenure as president, he established an enduring relationship between the university and Phil Knight and Nike, which has continued to provide significant financial support to the university's athletic program. In April 2000, students protesting labor conditions at Nike blocked Frohnmayer from leaving his office, until they were arrested. Later in April, the University joined the Workers Rights Consortium. In response, Knight retracted a $30 million donation. After Frohnmayer withdrew the university from the consortium in February 2001, Knight restored his donation.

== Personal life ==
Frohnmayer met Lynn Johnson, a native of Grants Pass, Oregon, and returned Peace Corps volunteer, while working in Washington, D.C., as executive assistant to Robert Finch, Secretary of Health, Education, and Welfare in the Nixon administration. They were set up by both sets of their parents, who were friends in Southern Oregon. After marrying, they returned to Oregon where they raised their five children—Kirsten, Mark, Katie, Jonathan, and Amy—in Eugene.

In 1983, during Frohnmayer's first term as Oregon's Attorney General, daughters Kirsten and Katie were diagnosed with Fanconi anemia, a rare and life-threatening recessive genetic illness. Their third daughter Amy, born in 1987, also inherited the disease. Lynn and Dave together founded the FA Family Support Group in 1985 to help share disease and treatment information with other families afflicted by the illness and in 1989 established the Fanconi Anemia Research Fund to fund research that would lead to a cure. All three Frohnmayer daughters died of complications related to Fanconi anemia: Katie in 1991 at age 12, Kirsten in 1997 at age 24, and Amy Elizabeth Winn in 2016 at age 29.

Frohnmayer was also a founding Director of the National Marrow Donor Program and served as a member of the Board of Trustees of the Fred Hutchinson Cancer Research Center.

Frohnmayer's upbringing was heavily influenced by his father Otto's dedication to the law and public service and his mother MarAbel's love of music. His elder sister, Mira, had a distinguished career as a vocalist and music professor. His brother, John, served as chairman of the National Endowment for the Arts under the administration of President George H. W. Bush and briefly challenged incumbent senator Gordon Smith in the 2008 election as an independent. His late brother, Philip, who resided in New Orleans, Louisiana, was professor of music at Loyola University. In 2005, the University of Oregon's MarAbel B. Frohnmayer Music Building was named in honor of his mother.

=== Death ===
On March 10, 2015, Frohnmayer died of prostate cancer, aged 74. "I am heartbroken at the loss of my wonderful and brilliant friend Dave Frohnmayer," Gov. Kate Brown said in a statement. "His deep love of Oregon is reflected in a lifetime of leadership and public service. My thoughts and prayers go out to Lynn and the Frohnmayer family at this difficult time."

Legal offices
Preceded by James M. Brown	Oregon Attorney General; 1981–1991	Succeeded by Charles Crookham
Academic offices
Preceded by Myles Brand	President of the University of Oregon; 1994 - 2009	Succeeded by Richard W. Lariviere
Party political offices
Preceded by Norma Paulus	Republican nominee for Governor of Oregon; 1990	Succeeded by Denny Smith
