= Norma Paulus =

American politician (1933-2019)

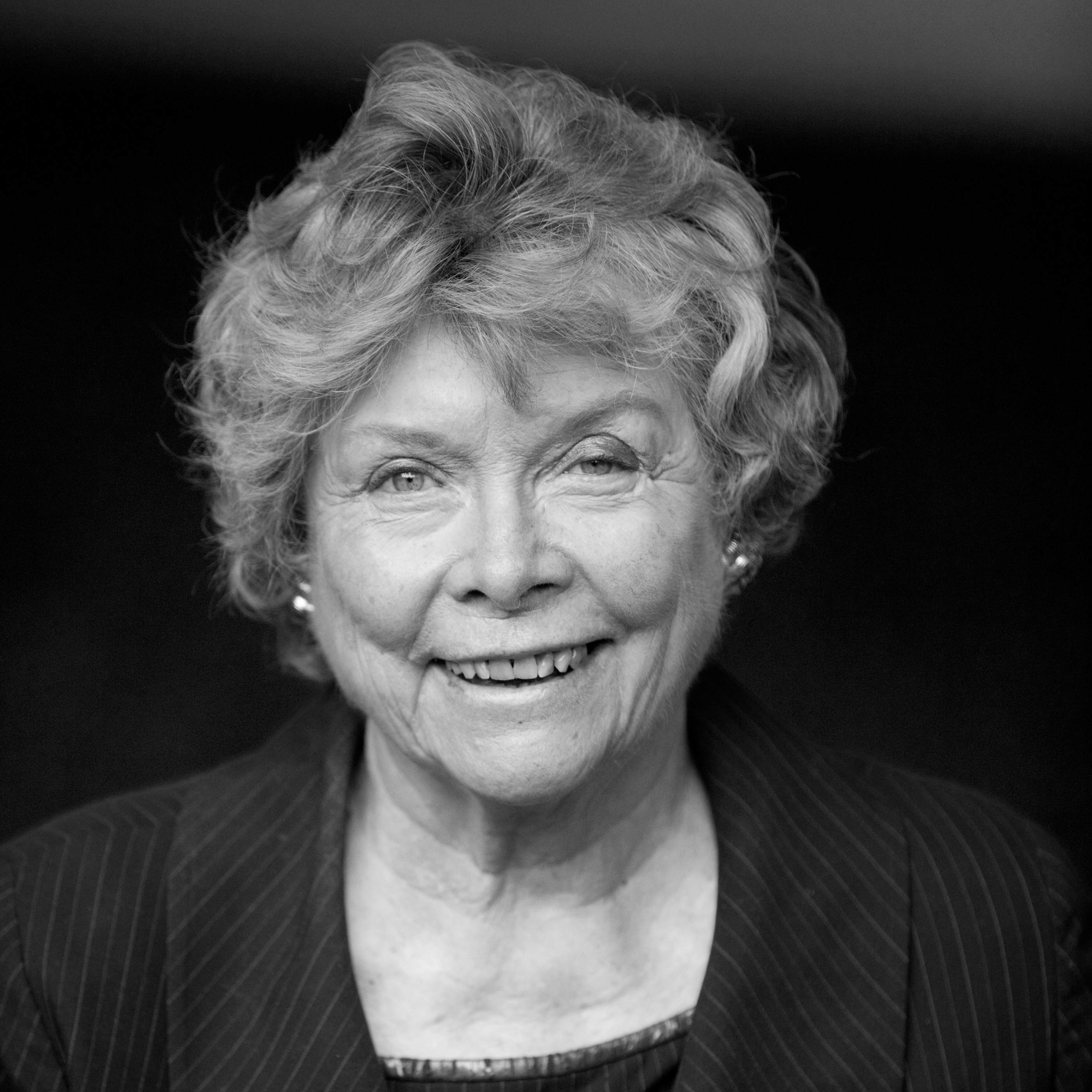

Superintendent of Public Instruction of Oregon
- In office October 1, 1990 – January 4, 1999
- Governor: Neil Goldschmidt; Barbara Roberts; John Kitzhaber
- Preceded by: John Erickson
- Succeeded by: Stan Bunn

20th Secretary of State of Oregon
- In office January 3, 1977 – January 7, 1985
- Governor: Robert Straub; Victor Atiyeh
- Preceded by: Clay Myers
- Succeeded by: Barbara Roberts

Personal details
- Born: Norma Jean Petersen; March 13, 1933 Belgrade, Nebraska, U.S.
- Died: February 28, 2019 (aged 85) Portland, Oregon, U.S.
- Party: Republican
- Spouse: William Paulus (died 1999)
- Children: 2
- Education: Willamette University (LLB)

Norma Jean Paulus (née Petersen; March 13, 1933 – February 28, 2019) was an American lawyer and politician in the state of Oregon. A native of Nebraska, she was raised in Eastern Oregon before becoming a lawyer. A Republican, she first held political office as a representative in the Oregon House of Representatives, and then became the first woman elected to statewide public office in Oregon when she became Oregon Secretary of State in 1977. Paulus later served as Oregon Superintendent of Public Instruction for nine years. She made unsuccessful bids to become Governor of Oregon and United States Senator. Prior to her death on February 28, 2019, Paulus lived in Portland, where she was involved with several non-profit groups and sponsored a ballot measure to create open primaries in Oregon's statewide elections.

== Early life ==
Norma Jean Petersen was born in Belgrade, Nebraska, on March 13, 1933. She was raised as one of seven children in Eastern Oregon, where she graduated from Burns Union High School in Burns, in 1950. Paulus started her career as the secretary for the district attorney for Harney County in Burns, Oregon.

After recovering from poliomyelitis, she moved to Salem, Oregon (the state's capital), and worked as a legal secretary, including working for Oregon Supreme Court Chief Justices Earl C. Latourette and William M. McAllister. Latourette recommended Paulus to attend law school, which she did at Willamette University without a college degree, enrolling in 1956. While in law school, she met her future husband William G. Paulus. Norma Paulus graduated with honors from Willamette University College of Law in Salem with a LL.B. in 1962. Following law school Paulus worked in private practice until entering politics.

== Political career ==
Paulus began her political career by winning election to the Oregon House of Representatives in 1970. Elected as a Republican, she represented Salem and Marion County in District 11. She won re-election in 1972 and 1974 to additional two-year terms in the House with her district changing to District 31, serving through the 1975 special legislative session. Paulus was then elected as Oregon's first female Secretary of State in 1976, the first time a woman won election to a statewide office in Oregon.

She took office on January 3, 1977, and served through January 7, 1985, after winning re-election to a second four-year term in 1980. Paulus kept a small statue of a lion on a desk in her downtown Portland home that was given to her in October 1981 by the northeast Portland Lions Club when she was inducted as the group's first female member. The next day, Paulus was visited in her office at the Oregon Capitol by the president of the statewide Oregon Lions Club. He had come to ask Paulus to return the Portland club's gift. He did not think the statue – or membership into the club – should have been given to a woman.

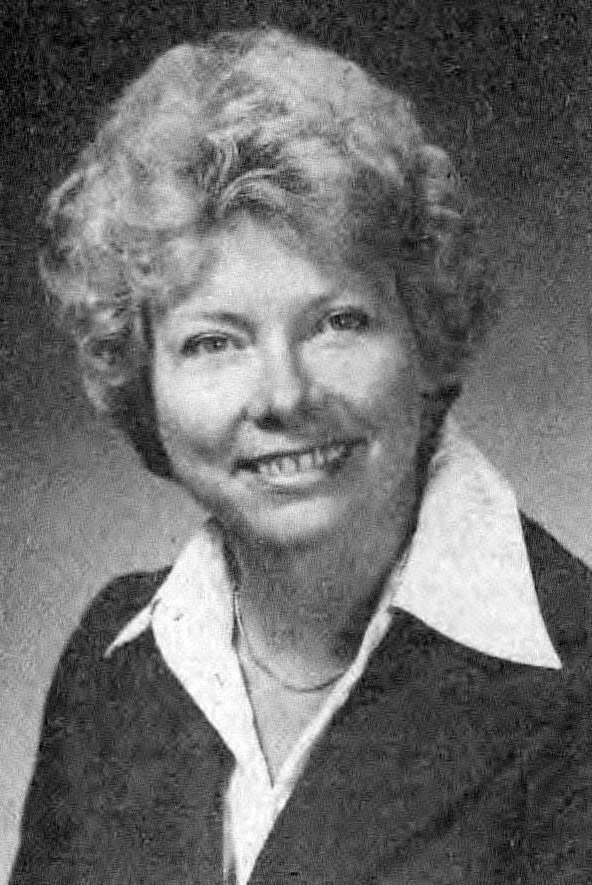
Paulus in 1976

Paulus was a founding member of the Oregon Women's Political Caucus, a bipartisan group of Oregon legislators in 1972. She was instrumental in efforts to pass an Equal Rights Amendment in Oregon in 1973 and 1977. Also, in 1972, she was invited to be part of the Eagleton Institute of Politics' first conference on women in politics. A decade later, while serving as Secretary of State, she was a principal speaker at the Institute's 1982 conference. Paulus remarked in her speech that "We have come a long way" referring to women in politics. In 1984, followers of the Bhagwan Shree Rajneesh bused homeless people to Wasco County in an attempt to sway local elections. As Secretary of State, Paulus recommended the county institute emergency procedures to restrict these transients from registering to vote, which the Rajneeshees challenged in federal court. At that time Oregon allowed citizens to register to vote on the same day as an election. Then federal district judge Edward Leavy ruled against the Rajneeshees, determining the emergency procedures were proper. The religious sect later faced government investigations over immigration fraud, a related failed murder plot, and the first bioterrorist attack in the United States.

Following her two terms as the Secretary of State, Paulus ran for governor in 1986. She won the Republican primary in May, but lost to Democrat Neil Goldschmidt in the November election. While campaigning for the office she had been a critic of the new MAX Light Rail that opened that year. During this period, Paulus was appointed by President Ronald Reagan to help oversee the 1986 Philippine presidential elections.

In 1987, she was appointed as one of two Oregon members of the Northwest Power and Conservation Council. While on the council, she was a supporter of regional fish habitat protection. She resigned her position on the Council in late 1989 to run for Oregon Superintendent of Public Instruction after the retirement of Verne Duncan.

Goldschmidt later appointed her as the Superintendent of Public Instruction on October 1, 1990. Paulus won election to a full four-year term in that office later in the year, and was re-elected in 1994. Paulus then ran for the United States Senate in the December 5, 1995, special primary election. The election was for the nominations to replace Bob Packwood who resigned. Paulus lost to Gordon H. Smith in the Republican primary. Smith then lost to Ron Wyden in the general election before he was elected later in 1996 to fill the vacancy left when Mark Hatfield retired.

As state superintendent, Paulus helped introduce statewide assessment testing for grades 3, 5, 8, and 11 in 1991. Other education reforms introduced that year were the Certificate of Initial Mastery (CIM) and Certificate of Advanced Mastery (CAM) that were designed to replace the high school diploma in Oregon. These were optional programs which were part of a broader program that included issuing a report card outlining the progress as a state, as required by a law the state legislature passed in 1991. Paulus also supported school-to-work initiatives for reforming public education while in office, which were part of the 1991 reforms. At the time Paulus was one of only ten women in the nation to hold the top education position in their state. She left the office on January 4, 1999, after two terms. In 2007, the Oregon Legislature eliminated the optional certificates from schools in the state.

== Later life and family ==
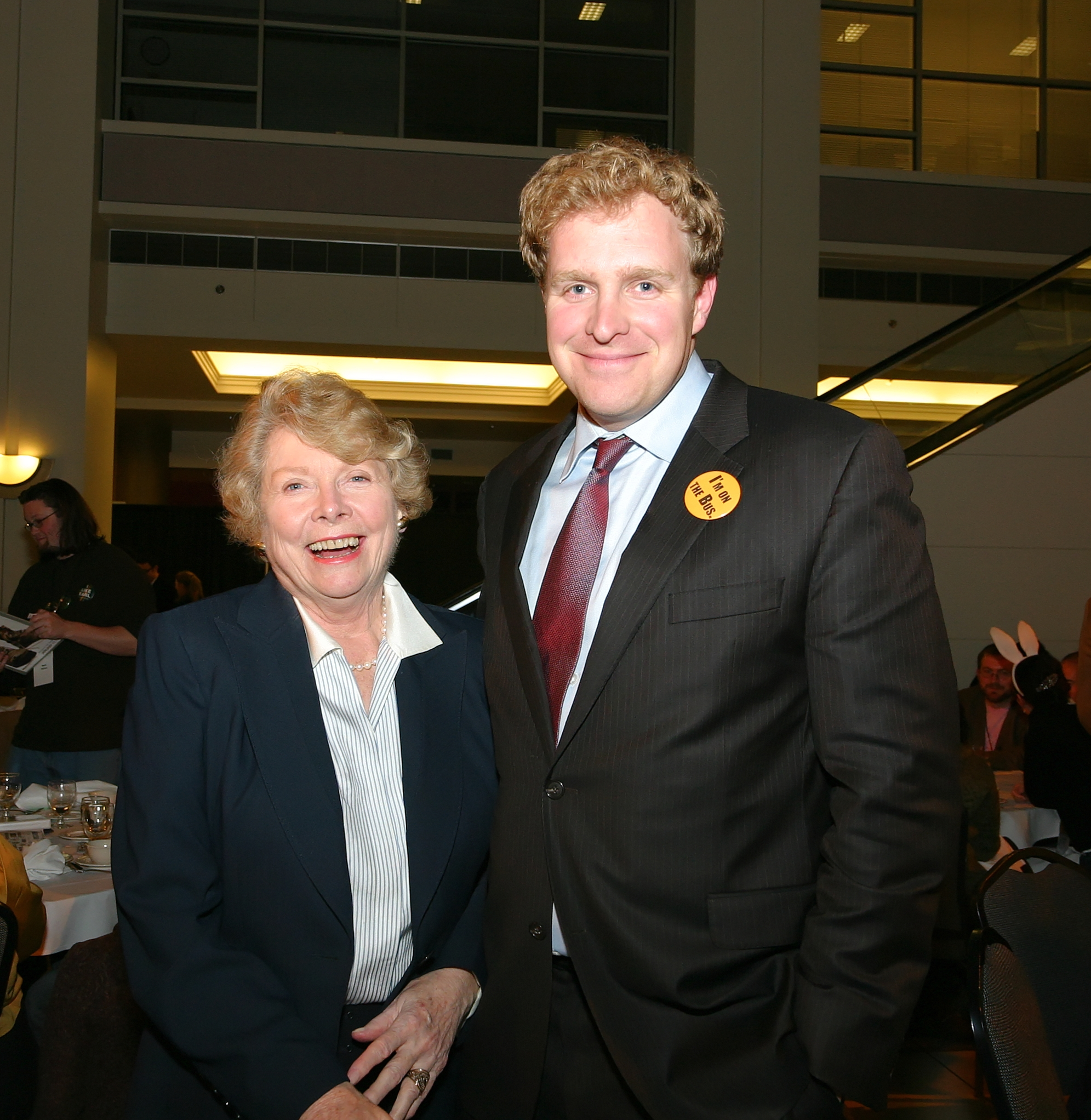
Paulus and Jefferson Smith in 2008

Norma and her husband William had two children, Elizabeth and Fritz. In 1996, she was named to the National Assessment Governing Board by United States Secretary of Education Richard Riley. She was conferred with honorary degrees by Willamette University in 1999, Whitman College, Lewis & Clark College, and Linfield College. In December 2000, she was appointed as the executive director of the Oregon Historical Society and served in that position until 2003. From 2000 until 2013, Paulus was a member of the Oregon State Capitol Foundation Board. She was an original member of the organization and served as chair of the group. She served on the boards of the High Desert Museum in Bend, the Oregon Coast Aquarium in Newport, and the City Club of Portland. In 2004, she received the University of Oregon's Distinguished Service Award.

She worked to raise funds for a statue honoring former governor and longtime friend Tom McCall, with the statue completed and installed in Salem along the Willamette River in 2008. In 2008, Paulus and co-petitioner Phil Keisling, also a former Oregon Secretary of State, brought Ballot Measure 65 to the November ballot, in an effort to reform the state's primary election system for partisan races.

In 2015, then-Oregon Secretary of State Kate Brown dedicated the 2015–2016 edition of the Oregon Blue Book to Paulus, in honor of her lifelong service to the state, including her role as the first woman elected to that office, and statewide, in Oregon history.

In May 2017, Oregon State University Press published "The Only Woman In the Room": the Norma Paulus story, which is based on oral histories and archives held at Oregon Historical Society Research Library, Willamette University Archives, and the Oregon State Archives.

Norma Paulus died in a Portland nursing home on February 28, 2019, from complications of vascular dementia, at the age of 85.

== See also ==
- List of female secretaries of state in the United States

Political offices
Preceded by Clay Myers	Secretary of State of Oregon; 1977–1985	Succeeded by Barbara Roberts
Preceded by John Erickson	Superintendent of Public Instruction of Oregon; 1990–1999	Succeeded by Stan Bunn
Party political offices
Preceded by Victor Atiyeh	Republican nominee for Governor of Oregon; 1986	Succeeded by David Frohnmayer
