= Barbara Roberts =

Governor of Oregon from 1991 to 1995

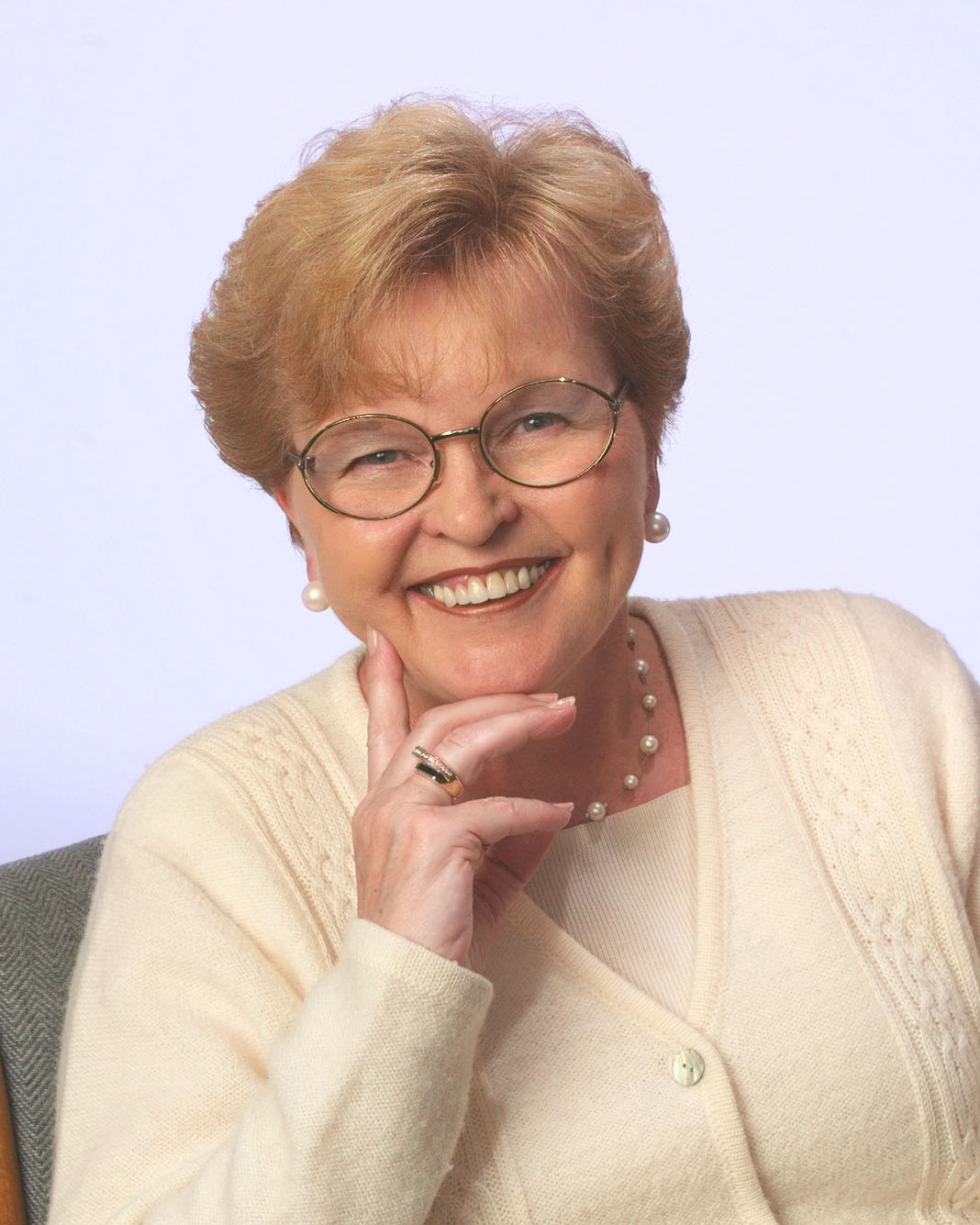

34th Governor of Oregon
- In office January 14, 1991 – January 9, 1995
- Preceded by: Neil Goldschmidt
- Succeeded by: John Kitzhaber

21st Secretary of State of Oregon
- In office January 7, 1985 – January 14, 1991
- Governor: Victor Atiyeh; Neil Goldschmidt
- Preceded by: Norma Paulus
- Succeeded by: Phil Keisling

Majority Leader of the Oregon House of Representatives
- In office January 10, 1983 – July 30, 1984
- Preceded by: Grattan Kerans
- Succeeded by: Shirley Gold

Member of the Oregon House of Representatives from the 17th district
- In office January 12, 1981 – January 7, 1985
- Preceded by: George Starr
- Succeeded by: Mike Burton

Metro Councilor from the 6th district
- In office February 24, 2011 – January 7, 2013
- Preceded by: Robert Liberty
- Succeeded by: Bob Stacey

Personal details
- Born: Barbara Kay Hughey; December 21, 1936 (age 89) Corvallis, Oregon, U.S.
- Party: Democratic
- Spouses: Neal Sanders (m. 1954; div. 1972); Frank L. Roberts (m. 1974; died 1993)
- Children: 2
- Education: Portland State University (BA)

Barbara Kay Roberts (née Hughey; born December 21, 1936) is an American politician from the state of Oregon. A native of the state, she served as the 34th governor of Oregon from 1991 to 1995. She was the first woman elected to serve as Oregon governor, and the only woman elected to that office until 2016. A Democrat, Roberts was also the first woman to serve as majority leader in the Oregon House of Representatives. She also won two terms as Oregon Secretary of State, and served in local and county government in Portland. Roberts was married to Oregon state Sen. Frank L. Roberts from 1974 until his death in 1993. From February 2011 until January 2013, she served on the council of Metro, the regional government in the Portland metropolitan area.

== Early life ==
Roberts was born Barbara Kay Hughey on December 21, 1936, in Corvallis, Oregon, to Bob and Carmen Murray Hughey. Her father, a millworker, was a descendant of Oregon Trail pioneers. The Hugheys' second daughter Pat was born a few years later and then they moved to Los Angeles, California in 1940 where her father worked as a machinist. Following World War II, the Hugheys returned to Oregon, settling in Gold Creek in Yamhill County in 1945, and then finally in Sheridan.

In 1954, she married her high-school sweetheart Neal Sanders, graduating the following year from Sheridan High School. The couple moved to Texas, where they had two children, Mike and Mark, before returning to Oregon several years later, settling in Portland where she attended Portland State University from 1961 to 1964.

With her older son, Mike, diagnosed in 1962 as "severely emotionally disturbed" (later identified as autism), she became an advocate for special-needs children. In 1971, she successfully lobbied the Oregon State Legislature to require public schools to guarantee educational rights to these children. In 1972, her marriage to Neal ended in divorce.

== Political career ==
In 1973, she was elected to Parkrose School Board and, later, to the Mount Hood Community College board. In 1974, she married Oregon state representative and later state senator Frank L. Roberts, who became her political mentor. In 1980, she was elected to the Oregon House of Representatives as a Democrat, was re-elected in 1982. Her Democratic colleagues chose her as House Majority Leader from 1983 to 1984, Oregon's first woman to hold that post.

=== Secretary of State ===
In 1984, Roberts was elected as Oregon Secretary of State, the first Democrat elected to that post in over 100 years. She was re-elected in 1988. Her significant achievements as Secretary of State include election-reform legislation, the construction of a new state archives building, and broader audit powers for the Secretary of State. The Portland Gay Men's Chorus sang at her inauguration. It is widely believed that this was the first time that a gay-identified chorus sang for the inauguration of a statewide elected official of any state. During her second term, Roberts attended an executive program at the Harvard Kennedy School at Harvard University.

=== Governor ===
Democratic Gov. Neil Goldschmidt announced that he would not seek a second term as governor in 1990. Roberts, halfway through her second term as secretary of state, announced she would run for governor. She ran unopposed in the Democratic primary and went on to defeat Republican Attorney General David B. Frohnmayer and Independent Al Mobley in the November general election.

Roberts became the first woman elected Governor of Oregon.

During that same election, voters passed Ballot Measure 5, which established constitutional limits on property-tax rates.

During her term as governor, Roberts worked with the Clinton administration to secure federal waivers and funding for the Oregon Health Plan. She also helped to increase the number of children in the Head Start Program, secured financing for additional units of affordable housing, and developed programs to help move Oregonians from welfare to the workplace. The Roberts administration was known for its strong support of gay rights and appointed women to positions in state government.

Her husband, Frank L. Roberts, died in 1993 from prostate cancer while she was still governor. After his death, Barbara Roberts wrote the book Death Without Denial Grief Without Apology: A Guide for Facing Death and Loss.

There were several factors that were responsible for Roberts' decision not to seek re-election in 1994. The leading cause was to process the loss of her husband.

== Later life and family ==
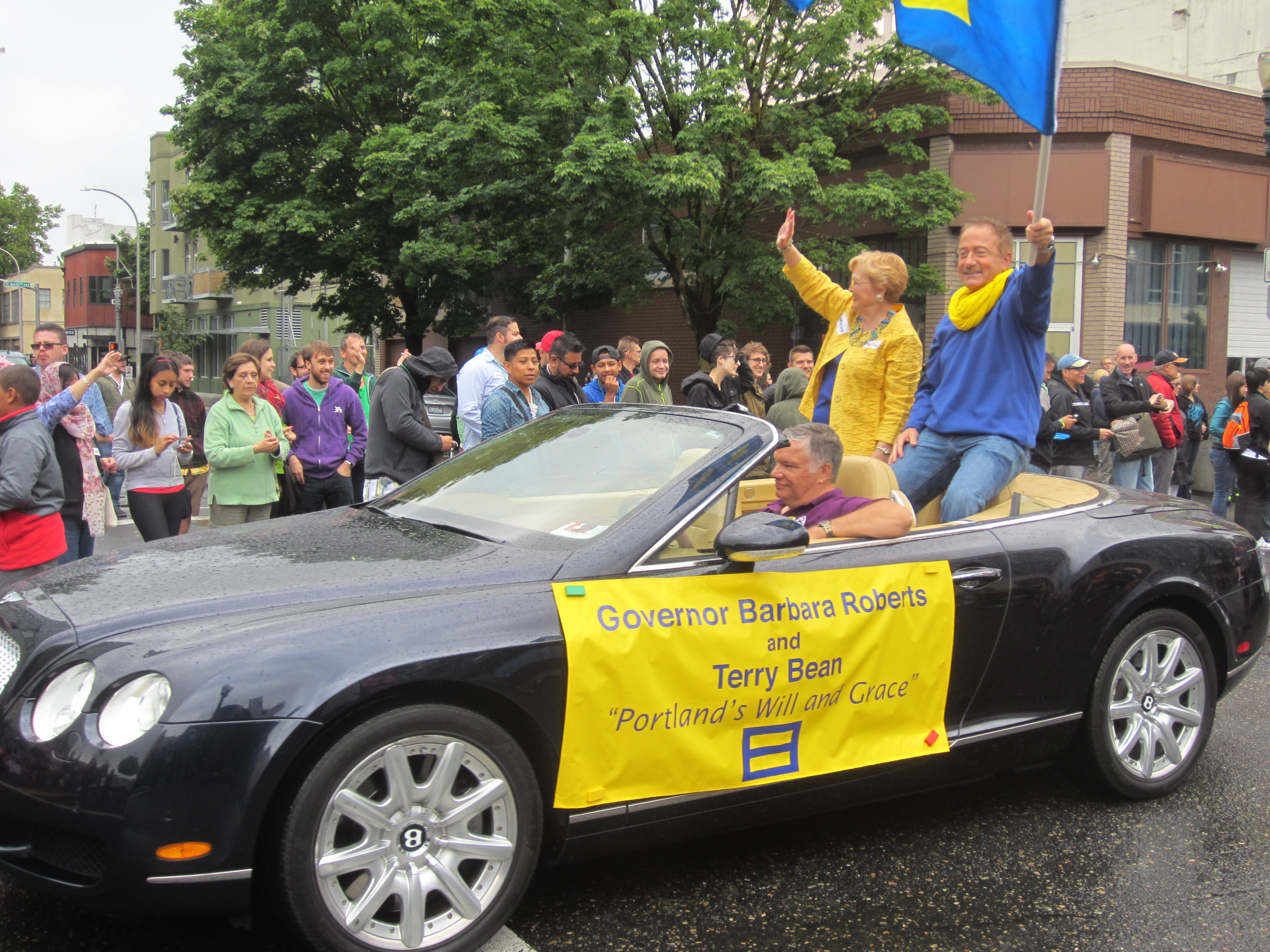
Roberts with Terry Bean in 2014

Soon after she left office, Roberts accepted a position at the Harvard Kennedy School at Harvard University as director of the Harvard Program for Senior Executives in State and Local Government and later as a senior fellow to the Women and Public Policy Program. In 1998, Roberts joined Portland State University's Hatfield School of Government's Executive Leadership Institute as Associate Director of Leadership Development.

Roberts has continued her community service, sitting on the board of trustees for several major nonprofit organizations, including the Oregon Hospice Association, the Human Rights Campaign, and the advisory council of Oregon's Compassion in Dying. She has also maintained an active public speaking career, addressing issues of death and grieving, leadership, women in politics, and environmental stewardship. Roberts has two sons, Mike and Mark Sanders, and two grandchildren, Robert M. Sanders and Kaitlin Sanders.

Roberts High School in Salem, Oregon, was named after her in 1996.

== Return to government service ==
In early 2011, Roberts returned to government service, as a member of the six-person Metro council, the Portland metropolitan area's elected regional government, after Robert Liberty resigned in January from his position as councillor representing Metro district 6. Roberts was appointed to the council in February to fill the remainder (about 22 months) of Liberty's four-year term, by a vote of the council. Although Metro council positions are publicly elected offices, an election is not required when filling a council vacancy in mid-term. She was sworn in on February 24, 2011. Metro district 6 includes portions of Northeast, Southeast and Southwest Portland. She indicated that she would not be a candidate for the position when it next came due for election, in May 2012, and Bob Stacey was elected to the district 6 seat at that time. Roberts' council term ended, and Stacey succeeded her, in January 2013.

== See also ==
- List of female governors in the United States
- List of female secretaries of state in the United States

Political offices
| Preceded by Norma Paulus | Secretary of State of Oregon; 1985–1991 | Succeeded by Phil Keisling |
| Preceded by Neil Goldschmidt | Governor of Oregon; 1991–1995 | Succeeded by John Kitzhaber |
Party political offices
| Preceded by Neil Goldschmidt | Democratic nominee for Governor of Oregon; 1990 | Succeeded by John Kitzhaber |
U.S. order of precedence (ceremonial)
| Preceded by Martha McSally as Former U.S. Senator | Order of precedence of the United States; Within Oregon | Succeeded by John Kitzhaber as Former Governor |
| Preceded by Tim Pawlenty as Former Governor | Order of precedence of the United States; Outside Oregon | Succeeded by John Kitzhaber as Former Governor |
