= 2026 Oregon House of Representatives election =

- November 3, 2026

All 60 seats in the Oregon House of Representatives 31 seats needed for a majority
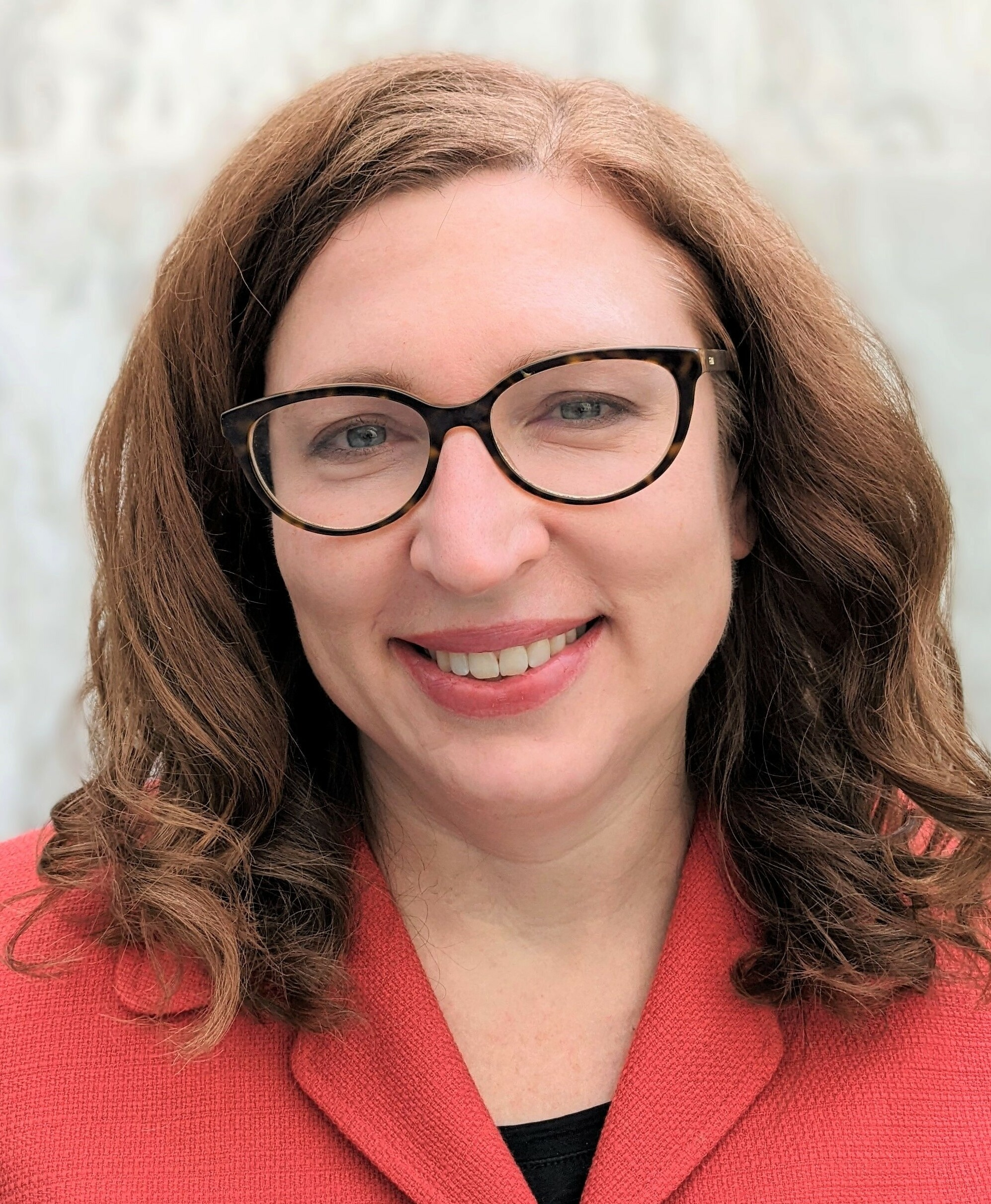

	Majority party	Minority party
Leader	Julie Fahey	Lucetta Elmer
Party	Democratic	Republican
Leader since	March 7, 2024	October 8, 2025
Leader's seat	14th–Eugene	24th–McMinnville
Last election	36 seats, 60%	24 seats, 40%
Seats before	37	23
Seats won	39	21
Seat change	▲3	▼3
Speaker before election
Julie Fahey
Democratic
Elected Speaker
TBD
TBD

The 2026 Oregon House of Representatives election was held on November 3, 2026, alongside the other 2026 Oregon elections and 2026 United States elections. Voters elected members of the Oregon House of Representatives in all 60 of the U.S. state of Oregon's legislative districts to serve a two-year term.

== Retirements ==
Eight representatives (3 Democrats and 5 Republicans) announced that they would not be seeking re-election.

=== Democrats ===
Three Democrats are not seeking re-election.

1. District 7: John Lively is retiring.
2. District 27: Ken Helm is retiring.
3. District 40: Annessa Hartman is retiring due to illness.

=== Republicans ===
Five Republicans are not seeking re-election

1. District 9: Boomer Wright is retiring.
2. District 11: Jami Cate is retiring to run for State Senate (eliminated in the State Senate primary).
3. District 17: Ed Diehl is retiring to run for the governorship of Oregon (eliminated in the gubernatorial primary).
4. District 18: Rick Lewis is retiring.
5. District 52: Jeff Helfrich is retiring to run for State Senate.

== Predictions ==
Source	Ranking	As of
Sabato's Crystal Ball	Safe D	January 22, 2026
State Navigate	Safe D	October 24, 2026

== District overview ==
Shaded cells indicate retiring representatives. Bold text indicates seats that flipped parties.

District	Incumbent	Party	Margin of victory	Elected Representatives	Party
1st	Court Boice	Rep	34.72%	Court Boice	Rep
2nd	Virgle Osborne	Rep	42.63%	Virgle Osborne	Rep
3rd	Dwayne Yunker	Rep	35.58%	Dwayne Yunker	Rep
4th	Alek Skarlatos	Rep	40.54%	Alek Skarlatos	Rep
5th	Pam Marsh	Dem	28.23%	Pam Marsh	Dem
6th	Kim Wallan	Rep	16.09%	Kim Wallan	Rep
7th	John Lively	Dem	11.77%	Kori Rodley	Dem
8th	Lisa Fragala	Dem	97.37% (Note: Ran unopposed.)	Lisa Fragala	Dem
9th	Boomer Wright	Rep	23.85%	Claire Lynn	Rep
10th	David Gomberg	Dem	97.37%	David Gomberg	Dem
11th	Jami Cate	Rep	47.96%	Ken Jackola	Rep
12th	Darin Harbick	Rep	15.48%	Darin Harbick	Rep
13th	Nancy Nathanson	Dem	33.10%	Nancy Nathanson	Dem
14th	Julie Fahey	Dem	94.09%	Julie Fahey	Dem
15th	Shelly Boshart Davis	Rep	17.54%	Shelly Boshart Davis	Rep
16th	Sarah Finger McDonald	Dem	66.91%	Sarah Finger McDonald	Dem
17th	Ed Diehl	Rep	38.70%	Dan Farrington	Rep
18th	Rick Lewis	Rep	41.78%	Amanda Staehely	Rep
19th	Tom Andersen	Dem	8.66%	Tom Andersen	Dem
20th	Paul Evans	Dem	16.18%	Paul Evans	Dem
21st	Kevin Mannix	Rep	3.83%	**Michael Welsh**	Dem
22nd	Lesly Muñoz	Dem	0.77%	Lesly Muñoz	Dem
23rd	Anna Scharf	Rep	24.23%	Anna Scharf	Rep
24th	Lucetta Elmer	Rep	19.39%	Lucetta Elmer	Rep
25th	Ben Bowman	Dem	35.43%	Ben Bowman	Dem
26th	Sue Rieke Smith	Dem	12.29% (Note: Margin of victory of Courtney Neron Misslin, who previously held this seat but was appointed to the Oregon State Senate.)	Sue Rieke Smith	Dem
27th	Ken Helm	Dem	48.18%	Tammy Carpenter	Dem
28th	Dacia Grayber	Dem	71.85%	Dacia Grayber	Dem
29th	Susan McLain	Dem	96.38%	Susan McLain	Dem
30th	Nathan Sosa	Dem	96.43%	Nathan Sosa	Dem
31st	Darcey Edwards	Rep	21.75%	Darcey Edwards	Rep
32nd	Cyrus Javadi	Dem (Note: Javadi switched to the Democratic Party in September 2025.)	4.36%	Cyrus Javadi	Dem
33rd	Shannon Jones Isadore	Dem	70.97%	Shannon Jones Isadore	Dem
34th	Mari Watanabe	Dem	43.05%	Mari Watanabe	Dem
35th	Farrah Chaichi	Dem	38.15%	Farrah Chaichi	Dem
36th	Hai Pham	Dem	25.87%	Hai Pham	Dem
37th	Jules Walters	Dem	22.69%	Jules Walters	Dem
38th	Daniel Nguyen	Dem	97.86%	Daniel Nguyen	Dem
39th	April Dobson	Dem	9.09%	April Dobson	Dem
40th	Annessa Hartman	Dem	11.86%	Michael Sugar	Dem
41st	Mark Gamba	Dem	59.88%	Mark Gamba	Dem
42nd	Rob Nosse	Dem	98.53%	Rob Nosse	Dem
43rd	Tawna Sanchez	Dem	84.46%	Tawna Sanchez	Dem
44th	Travis Nelson	Dem	98.29%	Travis Nelson	Dem
45th	Thuy Tran	Dem	98.04%	Thuy Tran	Dem
46th	Willy Chotzen	Dem	65.40%	Willy Chotzen	Dem
47th	Andrea Valderrama	Dem	95.53%	Andrea Valderrama	Dem
48th	Lamar Wise	Dem	6.15% (Note: Margin of victory of Hoa Nguyen, who died October 9, 2025.)	Lamar Wise	Dem
49th	Zach Hudson	Dem	11.93%	Zach Hudson	Dem
50th	Ricki Ruiz	Dem	9.32%	Ricki Ruiz	Dem
51st	Matt Bunch (Note: Christine Drazan, who formerly held this seat, was appointed to the state Senate in October 2025.)	Rep	94.13% (Note: Margin of victory of Christine Drazan, who was appointed to the state Senate in October 2025.)	Matt Bunch	Rep
52nd	Jeff Helfrich	Rep	3.79%	**Hank Sanders**	Dem
53rd	Emerson Levy	Dem	8.60%	Emerson Levy	Dem
54th	Jason Kropf	Dem	96.47%	Jason Kropf	Dem
55th	E. Werner Reschke	Rep	39.36%	E. Werner Reschke	Rep
56th	Emily McIntire	Rep	96.69%	Emily McIntire	Rep
57th	Greg Smith	Rep	97.58%	Greg Smith	Rep
58th	Bobby Levy	Rep	98.23%	Bobby Levy	Rep
59th	Vikki Breese-Iverson	Rep	43.49%	Vikki Breese-Iverson	Rep
60th	Mark Owens	Rep	98.79%	Mark Owens	Rep

== See also ==
- 2026 Oregon State Senate election
