= 83rd Oregon Legislative Assembly =

Session of the Oregon Legislative Assembly

←	82nd Legislative Assembly
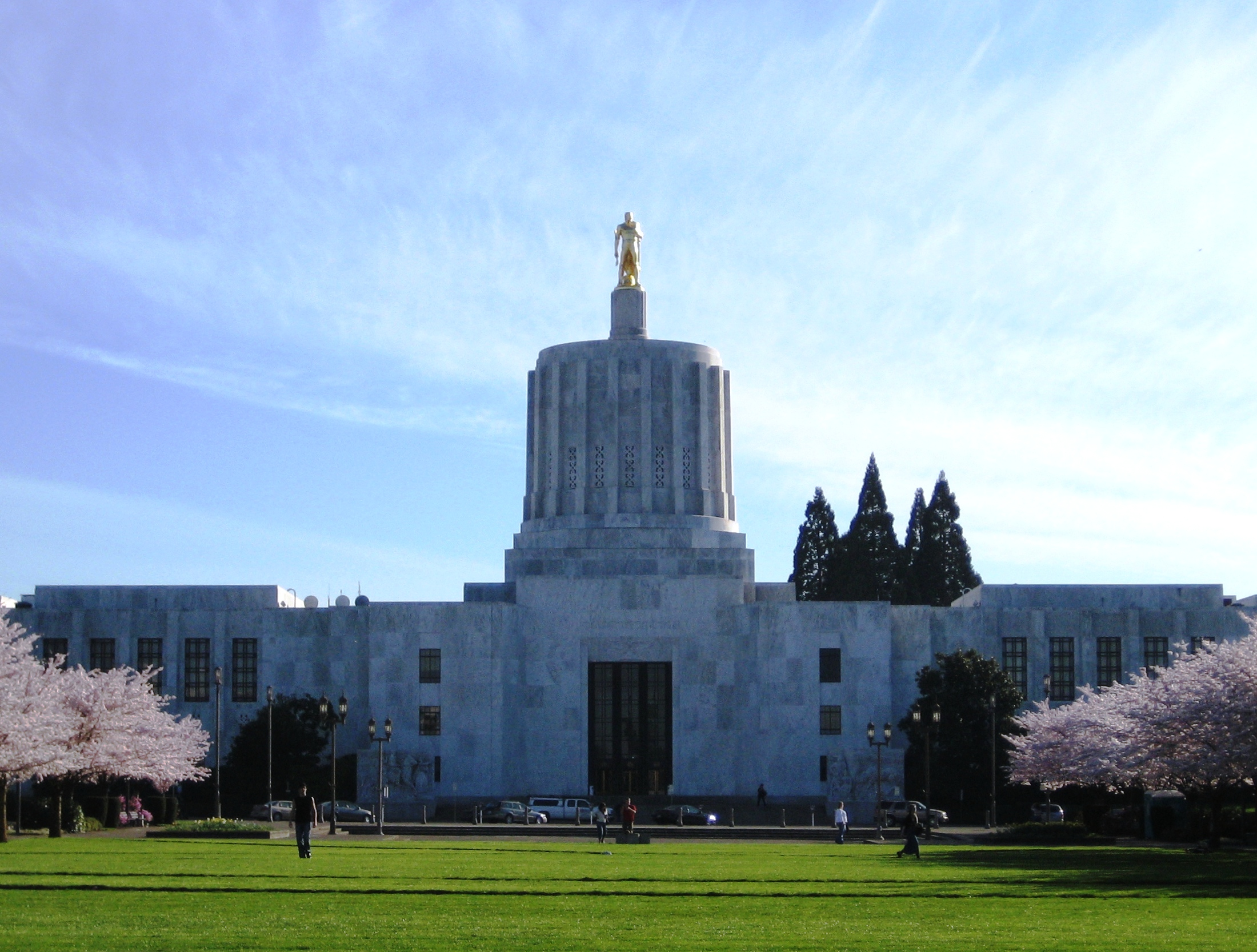
- The legislature convenes in the Oregon State Capitol, seen here in 2007

Overview
- Legislative body: Oregon Legislative Assembly
- Jurisdiction: Oregon, United States
- Meeting place: Oregon State Capitol
- Term: 2025–2027
- Website: www.oregonlegislature.gov

Oregon State Senate
- Members: 30 Senators
- Senate President: Rob Wagner (D)
- Majority Leader: Kayse Jama (D)
- Minority Leader: Bruce Starr (R)
- Party control: Democratic

Oregon House of Representatives
- Members: 60 Representatives
- Speaker of the House: Julie Fahey (D)
- Majority Leader: Ben Bowman (D)
- Minority Leader: Lucetta Elmer (R)
- Party control: Democratic

The 83rd Oregon Legislative Assembly is the current session of the Oregon Legislature. It began on January 21, 2025. Democrats netted one seat in both the House and the Senate to win a three-fifths supermajority in both chambers, which is required to pass new taxes or update existing taxes, holding 36 seats in the House and 18 in the Senate after the 2024 election. However, they fell short of the two-thirds majority required to unilaterally meet quorum in both houses, needing 2 more seats in the Senate and 4 more seats in the House.

This majority was later expanded by one to 37–23 in the House prior to the 2026 short session, as Cyrus Javadi of Tillamook switched parties from Republican to Democrat.

== Senate ==
Current makeup of the Oregon Senate in the 83rd Oregon Legislative Assembly.

The Oregon State Senate is composed of 30 members. Democrats flipped one seat (SD-27) and hold 18 seats, a three-fifths supermajority, for the first time since the 81st Oregon Legislative Assembly.

There are eight freshman senators in this legislative session, six of them Republicans due in part to the 2023 Senate walkout and the passage of Measure 113 denying legislators with 10 or more unexcused absences from running for re-election.

Senate President: Rob Wagner (D-19 Lake Oswego)
President Pro Tempore: James Manning Jr. (D–7 Eugene)
Majority Leader: Kayse Jama (D-24 Portland)
Minority Leader: Daniel Bonham (R-26 The Dalles) until September 15, 2025; Bruce Starr (R-12 Dundee) after

District	Senator	Party	Residence	Assumed office
1	David Brock Smith	Republican	Port Orford	2023 (Note: Senator was originally appointed.)
2	Noah Robinson	Republican	Cave Junction	2025
3	Jeff Golden	Democratic	Ashland	2019
4	Floyd Prozanski	Democratic	Eugene	2003
5	Dick Anderson	Republican	Lincoln City	2021
6	Cedric Hayden	Republican	Fall Creek	2023
7	James Manning Jr.	Democratic	Eugene	2017
8	Sara Gelser Blouin	Democratic	Corvallis	2015
9	Fred Girod	Republican	Stayton	2008
10	Deb Patterson	Democratic	Salem	2021
11	Kim Thatcher	Republican	Keizer	2015
12	Bruce Starr	Republican	Dundee	2025 (Note: Starr previously served in the Oregon House of Representatives representing District 3 between 1999 and 2003 and the Oregon Senate representing District 15 between 2003 and 2015.)
13	Aaron Woods (Note: Died April 19, 2025.)	Democratic	Wilsonville	2023
13	Courtney Neron Misslin	Democratic	Wilsonville	2025
14	Kate Lieber	Democratic	Beaverton	2021
15	Janeen Sollman	Democratic	Hillsboro	2022
16	Suzanne Weber	Republican	Tillamook	2023
17	Lisa Reynolds	Democratic	Portland	2025
18	Wlnsvey Campos	Democratic	Aloha	2023
19	Rob Wagner	Democratic	Lake Oswego	2018
20	Mark Meek	Democratic	Gladstone	2023
21	Kathleen Taylor	Democratic	Portland	2017
22	Lew Frederick	Democratic	Portland	2017
23	Khanh Pham	Democratic	Portland	2025
24	Kayse Jama	Democratic	Portland	2021
25	Chris Gorsek	Democratic	Troutdale	2021
26	Daniel Bonham (Note: Resigned October 5, 2025.)	Republican	The Dalles	2023
26	Christine Drazan (Note: Appointed October 23, 2025.)	Republican	Canby	2025
27	Anthony Broadman	Democratic	Bend	2025
28	Diane Linthicum	Republican	Beatty	2025
29	Todd Nash	Republican	Enterprise	2025
30	Mike McLane	Republican	Powell Butte	2025 (Note: McLane previously served in the Oregon House of Representatives, representing District 55 between 2010 and 2019.)

== House ==
Current makeup of the Oregon House of Representatives in the 83rd Oregon Legislative Assembly.

The Oregon House of Representatives is composed of 60 members, with Democrats also holding a supermajority of 36 seats.

Retirements, vacant seats, and election losses led to 11 freshman members of the House during this legislative session. Only one of these new members was due to an incumbent being defeated by a challenger from an opposing party, with Democrats gaining one seat from the previous session due to Lesly Muñoz defeating incumbent Republican Tracy Cramer by just 161 votes. However, two Republican legislators (Charlie Conrad and James Hieb) were defeated in their party's primary elections. They were replaced by Darin Harbick and Christine Drazan, respectively.

On September 5, 2025, Cyrus Javadi, originally elected as a Republican, changed his party registration to the Democratic Party, giving the Democrats a 37–23 majority for the short session in 2026.

Speaker: Julie Fahey (D-14 Eugene)
Speaker Pro Tempore: David Gomberg (D-10 Otis)
Majority Leader: Ben Bowman (D-25 Tigard)
Minority Leader: Christine Drazan (R-51 Canby) until October 1, 2025; Lucetta Elmer (R-24 McMinnville) after

District	Representative	Party	Residence	Assumed office
1	Court Boice	Republican	Gold Beach	2023 (Note: Representative was originally appointed.)
2	Virgle Osborne	Republican	Roseburg	2023
3	Dwayne Yunker	Republican	Grants Pass	2023
4	Alek Skarlatos	Republican	Canyonville	2025
5	Pam Marsh	Democratic	Ashland	2017
6	Kim Wallan	Republican	Medford	2019
7	John Lively	Democratic	Springfield	2013
8	Lisa Fragala	Democratic	Eugene	2025
9	Boomer Wright	Republican	Coos Bay	2021
10	David Gomberg	Democratic	Otis	2013
11	Jami Cate	Republican	Lebanon	2021
12	Darin Harbick	Republican	McKenzie Bridge	2025
13	Nancy Nathanson	Democratic	Eugene	2007
14	Julie Fahey	Democratic	Eugene	2017
15	Shelly Boshart Davis	Republican	Albany	2019
16	Sarah Finger McDonald	Democratic	Corvallis	2025
17	Ed Diehl	Republican	Stayton	2023
18	Rick Lewis	Republican	Silverton	2017
19	Tom Andersen	Democratic	Salem	2023
20	Paul Evans	Democratic	Monmouth	2015
21	Kevin Mannix	Republican	Salem	2023 (Note: Mannix previously served in the Oregon House of Representatives representing District 32 between 1989 and 1997 as a Democrat and between 1999 and 2001 as a Republican and in the Oregon Senate as a Republican between 1997 and 1999.)
22	Lesly Muñoz	Democratic	Woodburn	2025
23	Anna Scharf	Republican	Amity	2021
24	Lucetta Elmer	Republican	McMinnville	2023
25	Ben Bowman	Democratic	Tigard	2023
26	Courtney Neron Misslin (Note: Resigned May 9, 2025 after being appointed to the Senate.)	Democratic	Wilsonville	2019
26	Sue Rieke Smith	Democratic	King City	2025
27	Ken Helm	Democratic	Beaverton	2015
28	Dacia Grayber	Democratic	Tigard	2021
29	Susan McLain	Democratic	Forest Grove	2015
30	Nathan Sosa	Democratic	Hillsboro	2022
31	Darcey Edwards	Republican	Banks	2025
32	Cyrus Javadi	Republican	Tillamook	2023
32	Cyrus Javadi	Democratic (Note: Changed party registration to the Democratic Party on September 5, 2025.)	Tillamook	2023
33	Shannon Jones Isadore	Democratic	Portland	2024
34	Lisa Reynolds	Democratic	Portland	2021 (Note: Reynolds resigned on November 15, 2024 upon her appointment to the Oregon State Senate to fill the vacancy caused by the election of Elizabeth Steiner as Oregon State Treasurer.)
34	Mari Watanabe	Democratic	Bethany	2025
35	Farrah Chaichi	Democratic	Beaverton	2023
36	Hai Pham	Democratic	Hillsboro	2023
37	Jules Walters	Democratic	West Linn	2023
38	Daniel Nguyen	Democratic	Lake Oswego	2023
39	April Dobson	Democratic	Happy Valley	2025
40	Annessa Hartman	Democratic	Gladstone	2023
41	Mark Gamba	Democratic	Milwaukie	2023
42	Rob Nosse	Democratic	Portland	2014
43	Tawna Sanchez	Democratic	Portland	2017
44	Travis Nelson	Democratic	Portland	2022
45	Thuy Tran	Democratic	Portland	2023
46	Willy Chotzen	Democratic	Portland	2025
47	Andrea Valderrama	Democratic	Portland	2021
48	Hoa Nguyen (Note: Died October 9, 2025.)	Democratic	Portland	2023
48	Lamar Wise (Note: Wise was appointed to succeed the late Rep. Hoa Nguyen on November 5, 2025.)	Democratic	Portland	2025
49	Zach Hudson	Democratic	Troutdale	2021
50	Ricki Ruiz	Democratic	Gresham	2021
51	Christine Drazan (Note: Resigned October 23, 2025 after being appointed to the Oregon State Senate.)	Republican	Canby	2025 (Note: Drazan previously served in the Oregon House of Representatives representing District 39 between 2019 and 2022.)
51	Matt Bunch	Republican	Beavercreek	2025 (Note: Bunch was appointed to finish Drazan's term on November 17, 2025.)
52	Jeff Helfrich	Republican	Hood River	2023 (Note: Helfrich previously served in the Oregon House of Representatives representing District 52 between 2017 and 2019.)
53	Emerson Levy	Democratic	Redmond	2023
54	Jason Kropf	Democratic	Bend	2021
55	E. Werner Reschke	Republican	Klamath Falls	2017
56	Emily McIntire	Republican	Eagle Point	2023
57	Greg Smith	Republican	Heppner	2001
58	Bobby Levy	Republican	Echo	2021
59	Vikki Breese-Iverson	Republican	Prineville	2019
60	Mark Owens	Republican	Crane	2020

== See also ==
- 2024 Oregon State Senate election
- 2024 Oregon House of Representatives election
