= Dan Farrington =

Member-elect of the Oregon House of Representatives from the 17th district
- Assuming office January 11, 2027
- Succeeding: Ed Diehl

Personal details
- Party: Republican

Dan Farrington is a state legislator in Oregon. A Republican, he was elected to the Oregon House of Representatives in 2026.

He grew up in Newport, Oregon. He lives in Sublimity, Oregon. He was a candidate for a seat in the Oregon House in 2012 and 2022. His district inckudes East Salem and surrounding towns. In 2026 he was elected to succeeded Ed Diehl who ran for governor.

== See also ==
- 2026 Oregon House of Representatives election
