= Ken Jackola =

Oregon state legislator

Member-elect of the Oregon House of Representatives from the 11th district
- Assuming office January 11, 2027
- Succeeding: Jami Cate

Personal details
- Party: Republican

Ken Jackola is a state legislator in Oregon. A Republican, he was elected to the Oregon House of Representatives in 2026, defeating Democrat Ivan Maluski. He represents District 11. He succeeds Jami Cate. A combat veteran and business owner, he was mayor of Lebanon, Oregon. He has held management positions at two companies.

== See also ==
- 2026 Oregon House of Representatives election
