= Michael W. Sugar =

American politician and teacher

Michael Sugar

Member-elect of the Oregon House of Representatives from the 40th district
- Assuming office January 11, 2027
- Succeeding: Annessa Hartman

Personal details
- Party: Democratic

Michael W. Sugar is a history teacher and member-elect of the Oregon House of Representatives, having been elected to represent District 40 in 2026. He is a Democrat. Sugar teaches at West Linn High School.

== See also ==
- 2026 Oregon House of Representatives election
