= Kori Rodley =

American state legislator

Member-elect of the Oregon House of Representatives from the 7th district
- Assuming office January 11, 2027
- Succeeding: John Lively

Personal details
- Party: Democratic

Kori Rodley is a state legislator in Oregon. A Democrat, she is the member-elect of the Oregon House of Representatives, and she served on Springfield, Oregon's city council. She has worked at non-profits. She is married and has five adult children.

== See also ==
- 2026 Oregon House of Representatives election
