= Claire Lynn =

Member-elect of the Oregon House of Representatives from the 9th district
- Assuming office January 11, 2027
- Succeeding: Boomer Wright

Personal details
- Party: Republican

Claire Lynn is a state legislator in Oregon. A Republican, she represents rural District 9 in the Oregon House of Representatives. She is from a family that has worked in Oregon agriculture. She succeeded Boomer Wright.

== See also ==
- 2026 Oregon House of Representatives election
