= West Linn High School =

Public high school in West Linn, Oregon

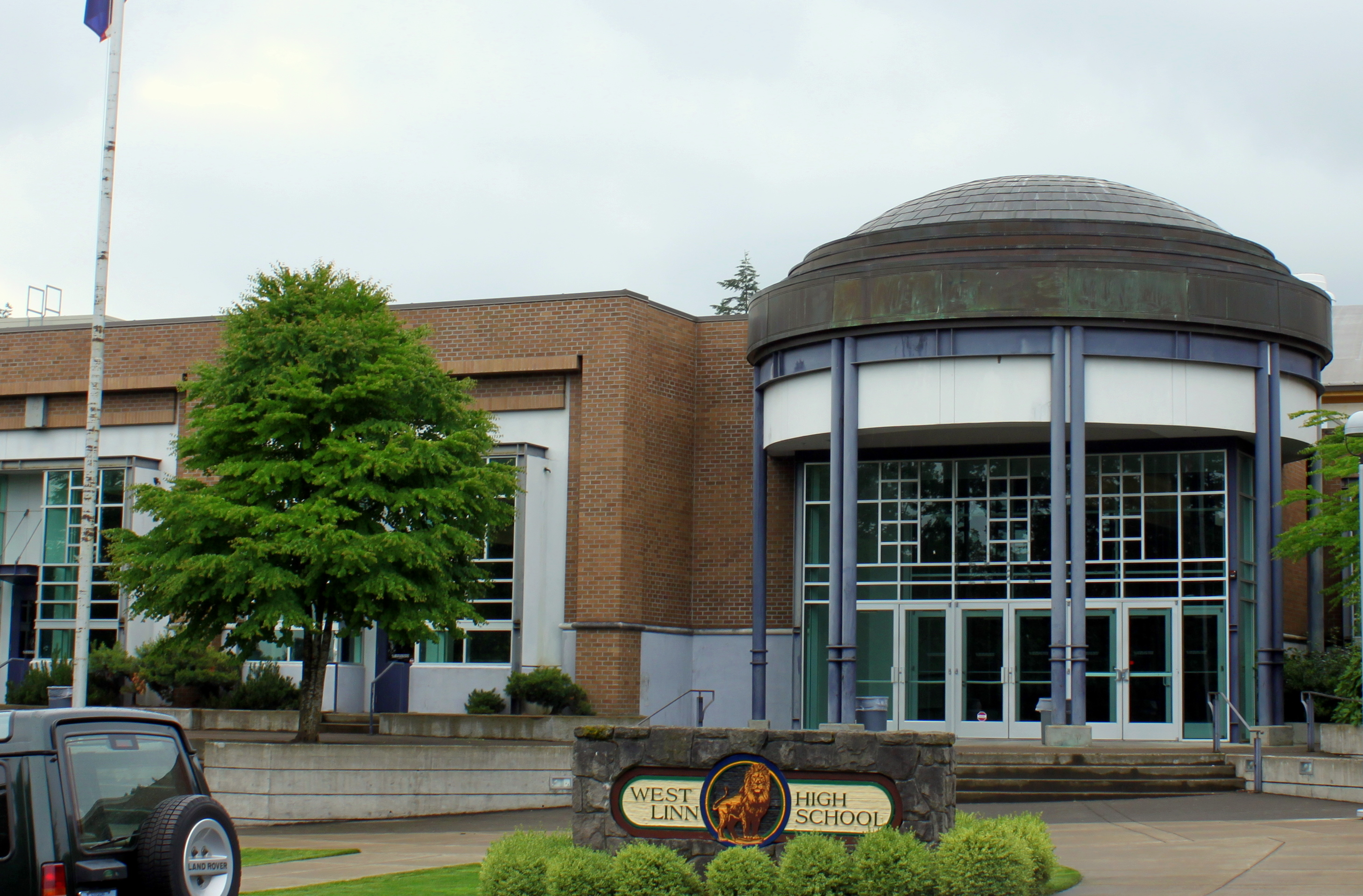

Location
- 5464 West A Street; West Linn, Clackamas, Oregon 97068; United States; 45.364089°N 122.615833°W

Information
- Type: Public
- School district: West Linn-Wilsonville School District
- Principal: Trevor Menne
- Teaching staff: 92.86 (FTE)
- Grades: 9–12
- Enrollment: 1,809 (2024–2025)
- Student to teacher ratio: 19.48
- Campus type: Suburban
- Colors: Forest Green and Gold
- Athletics conference: OSAA 6A-5 Three Rivers League
- Mascot: Lion
- Team name: Lions
- Rival: Oregon City High School
- Newspaper: The Amplifier
- Feeder schools: Athey Creek Middle School; Rosemont Ridge Middle School
- Website: www.westlinn.wlwv.k12.or.us

West Linn High School (WLHS) is a public high school in West Linn, Oregon, United States. It is one of three high schools in the West Linn-Wilsonville School District.

== Academics ==
In 1984, West Linn High School was honored in the Blue Ribbon Schools Program, the highest honor a school can receive in the United States.

In 2008, 93% of the school's seniors received their high school diploma. Of 373 students, 346 graduated, 18 dropped out, 6 received a modified diploma, and 3 are still in high school.

The four-year graduation rate at West Linn High School was 97 percent for the Class of 2013 cohort, meaning that nearly all West Linn students who entered high school in September 2009 graduated on time.

In 2014, 95% of the school's seniors graduated. 16 students dropped out.

=== Academic awards ===
The school received a silver ranking from U.S. News & World Report's 2010 "America's Best High Schools" survey.

== Athletics ==
West Linn High School athletic teams compete in the OSAA 6A-5 Three Rivers League. The athletics director is Brigham Baker and the athletics secretary is Shannon Maloney.

State championships:

- Baseball: 1978, 1982, 2022, 2023, 2024, 2026
- Boys Basketball: 1997, 2013, 2014, 2015, 2016
- Boys Swimming; 1948
- Boys Track and Field: 1996, 1997, 1998
- Boys Tennis: 2003, 2004, 2023
- Choir: 2019, 2022
- Dance/Drill: 1989, 1991
- Cheerleading: 2026
- Football: 2016, 2022, 2024
- Girls Basketball: 2026
- Girls Golf: 2010, 2011, 2014, 2016
- Girls Swimming: 1950, 1951
- Volleyball: 1998, 1999, 2003, 2007, 2021
- Wrestling: 2023
- Boys Lacrosse: 2000, 2003, 2014, 2015

== Faculty ==
History teacher Michael W. Sugar was elected to the Oregon House of Representatives in 2026.

== Notable alumni ==
- Dan Browne – distance runner, former U.S. Olympic athlete
- Kate Davis – singer, bassist
- Brandon Ebel – president of Tooth & Nail Records
- Alex Forsyth – professional football player
- Cole Gillespie – former professional baseball player
- Tony Glausi – musician
- Jayden Grant – professional football player
- David Hume Kennerly – Pulitzer Prize winning photographer
- Lindsay James – member of the Iowa House of Representatives
- Haley Joelle – songwriter and singer
- Sam Leavitt – college football player
- Anthony Mathis – professional basketball player
- Cade McNown – former professional football player
- Elijah Molden – professional football player
- Payton Pritchard – professional basketball player, Boston Celtics
- Jackson Shelstad – basketball player
- Chael Sonnen – silver medalist in Greco Roman Wrestling World University Championships, undefeated and undisputed champion in professional MMA
- Tim Tawa – professional baseball player
- Hollis Taylor – zoomusicologist
- Aaronette Vonleh – basketball player
- Mitch Williams – former professional baseball player
