= Marty Wilde (politician) =

American politician

Member of the Oregon House of Representatives from the 11th district
- In office January 14, 2019 – January 9, 2023
- Preceded by: Phil Barnhart
- Succeeded by: Jami Cate (redistricting)

Personal details
- Born: Marshall Wilde; 1974 (age 51–52) Blachly, Oregon
- Party: Democratic
- Spouse: Monique Carroll
- Children: 2
- Education: University of Maryland (B.S., M.H.A.); University of Houston (LL.M.)
- Profession: Lawyer, Military Veteran, Politician

Military service
- Branch/service: United States Air Force; Air National Guard; Oregon National Guard
- Rank: Colonel
- Awards: Bronze Star

Marshall "Marty" Wilde (born 1974) is an American politician from Oregon. A Democrat, he served in the Oregon House of Representatives where he represented District 11. This district included all or parts of Eugene, Creswell, Brownsville, rural Lane County, and rural Linn County. Wilde was first elected in 2018.

Wilde retired from the legislature in 2022 to make an unsuccessful run for Circuit Court judge.

== Early life and career ==
Wilde was raised on a small farm in Blachly, Oregon. His father was an organic farmer and his mother was an educator. He credits community investment in Medicaid, food stamps, and public schools for helping his family escape the cycle of poverty.

After graduating from the University of Maryland, Wilde joined the Oregon Army National Guard and later the Air National Guard. He has spent more than 27 years as an active member of the US military. During his military career, he served as Chief, Rule of Law in Afghanistan, for which he was awarded a Bronze Star. In addition, he was deployed in support of peace operations in Bosnia, served in Qatar prosecuting cases of Sexual assault in the United States military, and served in the NORAD Air Operations Center. He fought forest fires in Oregon, and worked on the conversion of a coal plant at the Elmendorf Air Force Base in Fairbanks, Alaska to less-polluting natural gas.

While serving in the military, Wilde attended the University of Oregon School of Law and earned a Master of Laws in health law at the University of Houston, and a Master of Healthcare Administration from the University of Maryland.

From 2007 to 2010, Wilde was the deputy district attorney for Linn County. Prior to his election, Wilde served as the Executive Director of the Lane County Medical Society where he worked to help improve access to care for patients on the Oregon Health Plan.

== Political career ==
In January 2018, Wilde filed his candidacy for the Oregon House of Representatives seat representing District 11 to replace incumbent Representative Phil Barnhart, who chose to retire after serving in the role for 17 years. In the election the following year, he defeated Kimberly Koops in the Democratic primary and later defeated Republican Mark Herbert in the general election, securing 57% of the vote. Wilde attributed his long career of public service as a deciding factor in the race.

Wilde's legislative goals include advocating for public schools, a clean environment, a fair tax system, education, healthcare, and housing. Believing healthcare to be a universal right, he supports universal coverage and expansion of the Oregon Health Plan. He plans to work across party lines with House Republicans to see how the business community could work with tax reform and to ensure that the Oregon tax rate is competitive nationwide to attract and keep businesses from moving or going out of business.

Since his election, Wilde has served on the Advisory Commission On Transparency, the House Committees on Energy and the Environment, and the Committee on Veterans and Emergency Preparedness.

== Personal life ==
Wilde lives in Eugene with his wife Monique, daughter Bella, and son Griffin. His sister, Rose Wilde, was first elected as Director of Lane Education Service District in 2013, a position she retains as of 2025.

== Electoral history ==
2018 Oregon State Representative, 11th district
Party	Candidate	Votes	%
Democratic	Marty Wilde	18,132	56.9
Republican	Mark F Herbert	13,690	43.0
Write-in		34	0.1
Total votes		31,856	100%

2020 Oregon State Representative, 11th district
Party	Candidate	Votes	%
Democratic	Marty Wilde	19,552	52.1
Republican	Katie Boshart Glaser	17,928	47.7
Write-in		69	0.2
Total votes		37,549	100%

2022 Judge of the Oregon Circuit Court, 2nd District, Position 11
Party	Candidate	Votes	%
Nonpartisan	Beatrice Grace	81,099	60.9
Nonpartisan	Marty Wilde	50,888	38.2
Write-in		1,084	0.8
Total votes		133,071	100%
