= Tammy Carpenter =

Member-elect of the Oregon House of Representatives from the 27th district
- Assuming office January 11, 2027
- Succeeding: Ken Helm

Personal details
- Party: Democratic

Tammy Carpenter is an anesthesiologist and state legislator in Oregon. A Democrat, she was elected to the Oregon House of Representatives from District 27 in 2026. She served on the school board in Beaverton, Oregon. She is a member of the Democratic Socialists of America.

== See also ==
- 2026 Oregon House of Representatives election
