= Phil Barnhart =

American politician

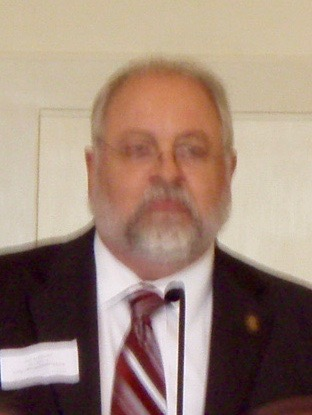

Member of the Oregon House of Representatives from the 11th district
- In office 2003–2019
- Succeeded by: Marty Wilde

Member of the Oregon House of Representatives from the 40th district
- In office 2001–2003

Personal details
- Born: 1946 (age 79–80) New Rochelle, New York, U.S.
- Party: Democratic
- Spouse: Florence
- Education: University of Oregon (BA, JD) California School of Professional Psychology (PhD)

Phil Barnhart (born 1946) is an American politician and psychologist from the state of Oregon. He was a Democratic member of the Oregon House of Representatives, representing District 11 from 2003 to 2019 and District 40 from 2001 to 2003.

== Early life and education ==
Barnhart was born in New Rochelle, New York and raised in Eugene, Oregon, where he graduated from South Eugene High School. He earned a Bachelor of Arts degree from the University of Oregon, a Juris Doctor from the University of Oregon School of Law, and a PhD in psychology from the California School of Professional Psychology.

== Career ==
Prior to entering politics, Barnhart worked as a psychologist and adjunct professor at the University of Oregon. He was elected to the Oregon House of Representatives in 2001 and assumed office in 2001. After serving one term, Barnhart's district was redrawn. He represented the 11th district from 2003 until his retirement in 2019.

== Electoral history ==
2004 Oregon State Representative, 11th district
Party	Candidate	Votes	%
Democratic	Phil Barnhart	19,098	57.1
Republican	Michael P. Spasaro	14,295	42.7
Write-in		66	0.2
Total votes		33,459	100%

2006 Oregon State Representative, 11th district
Party	Candidate	Votes	%
Democratic	Phil Barnhart	16,206	61.7
Republican	Jim Oakley	10,009	38.1
Write-in		57	0.2
Total votes		26,272	100%

2008 Oregon State Representative, 11th district
Party	Candidate	Votes	%
Democratic	Phil Barnhart	22,260	97.4
Write-in		589	2.6
Total votes		22,849	100%

2010 Oregon State Representative, 11th district
Party	Candidate	Votes	%
Democratic	Phil Barnhart	15,244	54.5
Republican	Kelly R Lovelace	12,657	45.2
Write-in		72	0.3
Total votes		27,973	100%

2012 Oregon State Representative, 11th district
Party	Candidate	Votes	%
Democratic	Phil Barnhart	15,842	55.8
Republican	Kelly Lovelace	12,477	43.9
Write-in		82	0.3
Total votes		28,401	100%

2014 Oregon State Representative, 11th district
Party	Candidate	Votes	%
Democratic	Phil Barnhart	13,522	52.6
Republican	Andy Petersen	12,090	47.1
Write-in		77	0.3
Total votes		25,689	100%

2016 Oregon State Representative, 11th district
Party	Candidate	Votes	%
Democratic	Phil Barnhart	17,585	53.3
Republican	Joe Potwora	15,318	46.5
Write-in		72	0.2
Total votes		32,975	100%
