= Sherrie Sprenger =

American politician

Member of the Oregon House of Representatives from the 17th district
- In office 2008–2021
- Preceded by: Fred Girod
- Succeeded by: Jami Cate

Personal details
- Born: Lacomb, Oregon, U.S.
- Party: Republican
- Education: Corban University
- Profession: Businessperson, politician
- Website: Legislative website

Sherrie Sprenger is a business owner and Republican politician from the US state of Oregon. A native of Linn County, she served in the Oregon House of Representatives for the 17th District from 2008 to 2021.

== Early life ==
Sprenger was born in the unincorporated community of Lacomb near Lebanon in Linn County. In 2005, she graduated from Leadership Oregon, and in 2007 earned a bachelor's degree from Corban College (now Corban University) in Salem, Oregon. Sprenger previously worked as a sheriff's deputy in Eastern Oregon's Grant County and in Benton County, which neighbors Linn County to the west. She is married to Kyle, and they have one son.

== Political career ==
By 2008 Sprenger had become chairperson of the Lebanon Community Schools' school board. On February 1, 2008, she was appointed to the Oregon House of Representatives to replace Fred Girod who had been appointed to the Oregon Senate. After winning election to a full two-year term in November 2008, she beat Bruce Cuff in the May 2010 primary and then won re-election to the House in November 2010 by defeating Democrat Richard Harisay in the general election, she was re-elected in 2012, 2014, and 2016. During the 2011 legislative session, Sprenger helped support a bill to once again allow people to use dogs when hunting cougars. The bill, which would have reversed part of Oregon Ballot Measure 18, passed in the House of Representatives but failed in a senate committee, therefore not reaching the floor of the senate.

== Electoral history ==
2008 Oregon State Representative, 17th district
Party	Candidate	Votes	%
Republican	Sherrie Sprenger	15,547	60.3
Democratic	Dan Thackaberry	10,180	39.5
Write-in		71	0.3
Total votes		25,798	100%

2010 Oregon State Representative, 17th district
Party	Candidate	Votes	%
Republican	Sherrie Sprenger	15,719	73.2
Democratic	Richard Harisay	5,689	26.5
Write-in		63	0.3
Total votes		21,471	100%

2012 Oregon State Representative, 17th district
Party	Candidate	Votes	%
Republican	Sherrie Sprenger	18,118	69.5
Democratic	Richard Harisay	7,872	30.2
Write-in		73	0.3
Total votes		26,063	100%

2014 Oregon State Representative, 17th district
Party	Candidate	Votes	%
Republican	Sherrie Sprenger	16,683	73.7
Democratic	Rich Harisay	5,845	25.8
Write-in		113	0.5
Total votes		22,641	100%

2016 Oregon State Representative, 17th district
Party	Candidate	Votes	%
Republican	Sherrie Sprenger	22,673	78.3
Independent	Jeffrey D Goodwin	6,113	21.1
Write-in		182	0.6
Total votes		28,968	100%

2018 Oregon State Representative, 17th district
Party	Candidate	Votes	%
Republican	Sherrie Sprenger	20,880	71.2
Democratic	Renee Windsor-White	8,384	28.6
Write-in		69	0.2
Total votes		29,333	100%
