= 2026 Oregon gubernatorial election =

- November 3, 2026
- Reporting: 98% as of November 21, 8:15 PM PST

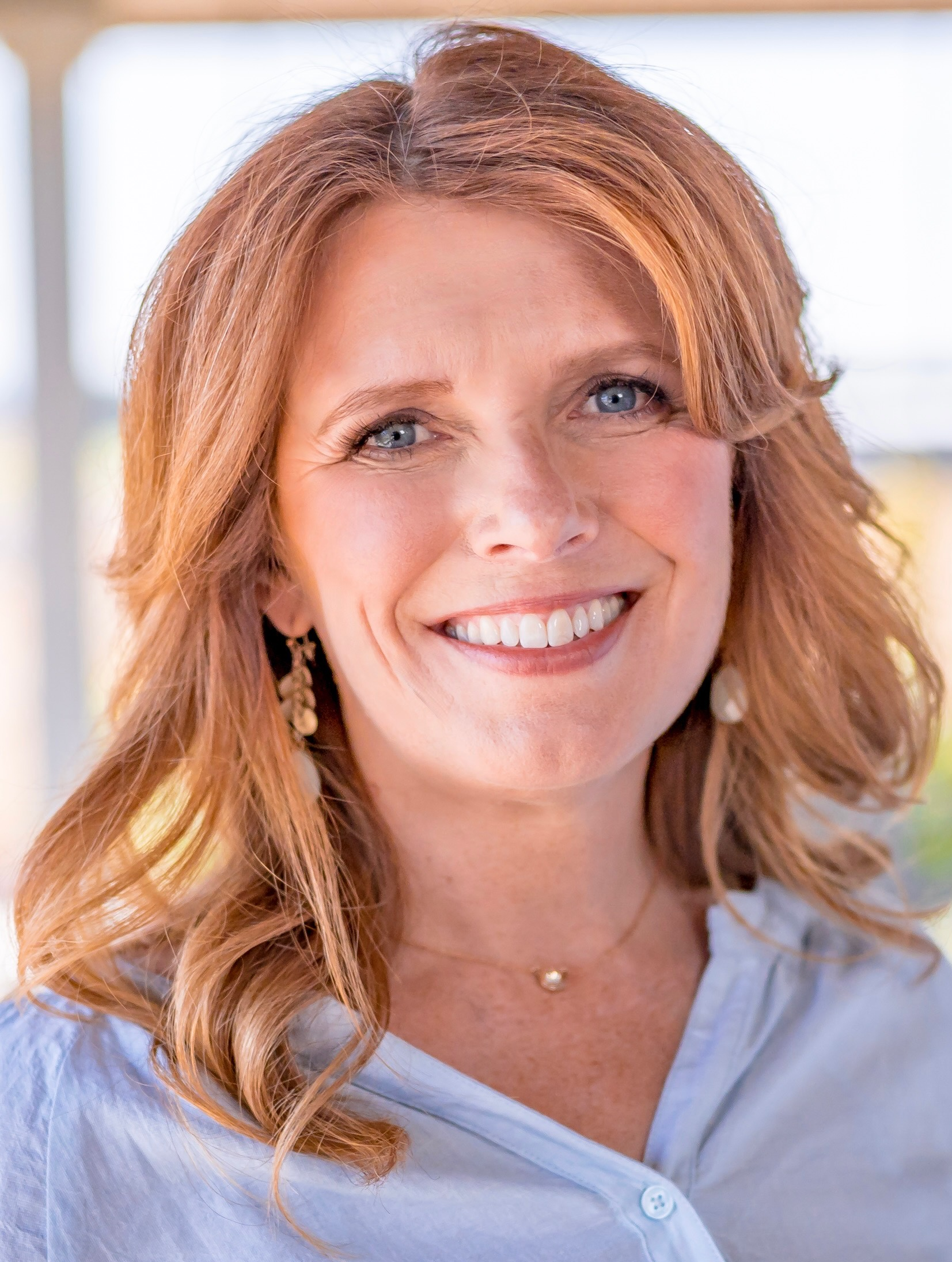
Nominee	Tina Kotek	Christine Drazan
Party	Democratic	Republican
Alliance	Working Families	Libertarian
Popular vote	1,056,062	865,418
Percentage	53.3%	43.7%
- County results Kotek: 40–50% 50–60% 60–70% 70–80% Drazan: 50–60% 60–70% 70–80% 80–90%
Governor before election
Tina Kotek
Democratic
Elected Governor
Tina Kotek
Democratic

The 2026 Oregon gubernatorial election was held on November 3, 2026, to elect the governor of Oregon. Democratic incumbent Tina Kotek sought a second term, and was challenged by 2022 Republican gubernatorial nominee Christine Drazan. This election marked Oregon's first gubernatorial rematch since 1978.

Primary elections took place on May 19, 2026. Kotek won the Democratic nomination with 84% of the vote, while Drazan won the Republican nomination with 41% of the vote.

Kotek won re-election by just under 10 points, according to unofficial results. Besides improving on her numbers in the counties she carried in 2022, Kotek flipped Clackamas and Deschutes counties to the Democratic column. While ultimately losing them, she came within five points of Drazan in Marion County, and within ten points in Jackson and Tillamook counties. While Democrats have won every gubernatorial election in Oregon since 1982, only one of these victories, in 1998, has been by a margin greater than 10 points. Kotek became the first Oregon gubernatorial candidate to receive over a million votes.

== Democratic primary ==
=== Candidates ===
==== Nominee ====
- Tina Kotek, incumbent governor (2023–present)

==== Eliminated in primary ====
- Forest "Fora" Alexander, rabbi and political activist
- James Atkinson IV, inventor and 2024 Portland mayoral candidate
- Donnie Beckwith, businessman
- David Beem, salesperson
- Brittany N. Jones, political activist and non-profit founder
- Cal Kishawi
- Steve Laible, children's author
- Tristan Sheppard, volunteer firefighter
- Miranda Weigler, policy and strategy consultant

=== Endorsements ===
Tina Kotek

U.S. senators

- Jeff Merkley, Oregon (2009–present)
- Ron Wyden, Oregon (1996–present)

U.S. representatives

- Suzanne Bonamici, OR-01 (2012–present)
- Maxine Dexter, OR-03 (2025–present)
- Val Hoyle, OR-04 (2023–present)
- Janelle Bynum, OR-05 (2025–present)
- Andrea Salinas, OR-06 (2023–present)

Statewide officials

- Dan Rayfield, attorney general of Oregon (2024–present)
- Elizabeth Steiner, treasurer of Oregon (2025–present)
- Christina Stephenson, labor commissioner of Oregon (2023–present)

State legislators

- Rob Wagner, president of the Oregon Senate (2023–present) from the 19th district (2018–present)
- Julie Fahey, speaker of the Oregon House of Representatives (2024–present) from the 14th district (2017–present)

Local officials

- Keith Wilson, mayor of Portland (2025–present)

Labor unions

- International Union of Painters and Allied Trades
- Ironworkers Local 29
- International Brotherhood of Electrical Workers Local 48
- Oregon Building Trades Unions
- Oregon AFL-CIO
- Oregon Nurses Association
- SEIU Local 503
- SMART Union
- Western States Regional Council of Carpenters

Organizations

- EMILYs List
- Giffords
- Human Rights Campaign
Declined to endorse

Labor unions

- Oregon Education Association

Organizations

- Portland DSA

Political parties

- Oregon Working Families Party

Newspapers

- Portland Mercury

=== Results ===
Results by county Kotek: 50–60%; 60–70%; 70–80%; 80–90%

Democratic primary results
Party	Candidate	Votes	%
Democratic	Tina Kotek (incumbent)	385,999	83.6
Democratic	Brittany N. Jones	13,939	3.0
Democratic	Forest "Fora" Alexander	12,684	2.8
Democratic	Miranda Weigler	10,161	2.2
Democratic	Tristan Sheppard	6,006	1.3
Democratic	James Atkinson IV	5,902	1.3
Democratic	David Beem	4,863	1.1
Democratic	Steve Laible	3,692	0.8
Democratic	Cal Kishawi	2,422	0.5
Democratic	Donnie Beckwith	1,799	0.4
Write-in		14,228	3.1
Total votes		461,695	100.0

== Republican primary ==
=== Candidates ===
==== Nominee ====
- Christine Drazan, state senator (2025–present), former minority leader of the Oregon House of Representatives (2019–2021, 2025) and nominee for governor in 2022

==== Eliminated in primary ====
- Danielle Bethell, Marion County commissioner
- Hope Dalrymple
- Ed Diehl, state representative from the 17th district (2023–present)
- Chris Dudley, wealth management executive, former Portland Trail Blazers basketball player, and nominee for governor in 2010
- Kyle Duyck, genomics researcher
- David Medina, podcaster, participant in the January 6 United States Capitol attack
- Robert Neuman, business manager and candidate for labor commissioner in 2022
- Brad Peters
- Paul Romero
- DeAngelo Turner
- Wen Waddell
- Martin Ward
- Tim Youker

=== Endorsements ===
Danielle Bethell

Local officials

- Kevin Cameron, Marion County commissioner (2014–present)
Ed Diehl

Organizations

- Oregon Right to Life (co-endorsement with Drazan)
Christine Drazan

Organizations

- Associated General Contractors Oregon-Columbia
- Maggie's List
- Oregon Farm Bureau
- Oregon Right to Life (co-endorsement with Diehl)

Newspapers

- The Oregonian
- Willamette Week

=== Polling ===
Poll source	Date(s) administered	Sample size (Note: Key: A – all adults RV – registered voters LV – likely voters V – unclear)	Margin of error	Danielle Bethell	Ed Diehl	Christine Drazan	Chris Dudley	David Medina	Other	Undecided
Hoffman Research Group (R) (Note: Poll commissioned by Crosstabs, a podcast that supports Republicans)	April 23–24, 2026	620 (LV)	± 3.9%	–	18%	35%	14%	–	8% (Note: "Some other candidate" with 8%)	25%
Nelson Research	April 14–17, 2026	515 (LV)	± 4.3%	2%	18%	37% (Note: With voters who lean towards a given candidate)	18%	7%	–	18%

=== Results ===
Results by county Drazan: 30–40%; 40–50%; 50–60%; Diehl: 30–40%; 40–50%; 50–60%

Republican primary results
Party	Candidate	Votes	%
Republican	Christine Drazan	172,474	40.5
Republican	Ed Diehl	140,458	33.0
Republican	Chris Dudley	71,929	16.9
Republican	David Medina	21,742	5.1
Republican	Danielle Bethell	9,629	2.3
Republican	Brad Peters	1,827	0.4
Republican	Paul Romero	1,615	0.4
Republican	Kyle Duyck	1,562	0.4
Republican	Robert Neuman	680	0.2
Republican	Martin Ward	539	0.1
Republican	Hope Dalrymple	534	0.1
Republican	DeAngelo Turner	377	0.1
Republican	Wen Waddell	321	0.1
Republican	Tim Youker	248	0.1
Write-in		1,622	0.4
Total votes		425,557	100.0

== Third-party and independent candidates ==
=== Declared ===
- Brett Smith, welder, pipefitter, inventor (Pacific Green Party)

== General election ==
=== Predictions ===
Source	Ranking	As of
The Cook Political Report	Lean D	October 29, 2026
Decision Desk HQ	Likely D	November 3, 2026
Fox News	Lean D	November 1, 2026
Inside Elections	Tilt D	October 29, 2026
NBC News	Likely D	November 3, 2026
RealClearPolitics	Tossup	November 1, 2026
Sabato's Crystal Ball	Lean D	November 2, 2026
Silver Bulletin	Likely D	November 3, 2026

=== Debates ===
2026 Oregon gubernatorial election debates
No.	Date	Host	Moderators	Link	Participants	
P Participant A Absent N Non-invitee I Invitee W Withdrawn						
P Participant A Absent N Non-invitee I Invitee W Withdrawn					Tina Kotek	Christine Drazan
1	October 1, 2026	KVAL-TV; University of Oregon	Kendall Bartley		P	P
2	October 7, 2026	KOBI-TV; Southern Oregon University	Craig Smullin		P	P
3	October 13, 2026	KTVZ; The Source Weekly	Lee Anderson		P	P

=== Post-primary endorsements ===
Tina Kotek (D)

Executive branch officials

- Barack Obama, 44th president of the United States (2009–2017)

Individuals

- Carrie Brownstein, musician and actress
- Jane Fonda, actress and activist

Labor unions

- Oregon AFSCME
- American Federation of Teachers Oregon
- Laborers' International Union of North America Oregon & Southern Idaho District Council of Laborers
- Oregon State Fire Fighters Council
- United Food and Commercial Workers Local 555

Organizations

- End Citizens United
- Planned Parenthood Action Oregon
- Reproductive Freedom for All
- Sierra Club Oregon
- Stand for Children Oregon

Political parties

- Oregon Working Families Party

Newspapers

- Eugene Weekly
- The Oregonian
- Portland Mercury
- Willamette Week
Christine Drazan (R)

Individuals

- Chris Dudley, former professional basketball player and politician

Labor unions

- Oregon Fraternal Order of Police

Organizations

- National Federation of Independent Business

Political parties

- Libertarian Party of Oregon (cross-nomination)
Declined to endorse

Labor unions

- Oregon Education Association

Organizations

- No Labels

Political parties

- Oregon Progressive Party
- Independent Party of Oregon

=== Polling ===
Aggregate polls

Source of poll aggregation	Dates administered	Dates updated	Tina Kotek (D)	Christine Drazan (R)	Other/Undecided (Note: Calculated by taking the difference of 100% and all other candidates combined.)	Margin
Silver Bulletin	through October 1, 2026	October 8, 2026	45.9%	43.9%	7.2%	Kotek +2.0%

Poll source	Date(s) administered	Sample size	Margin of error	Tina Kotek (D)	Christine Drazan (R)	Brett Smith (G)	Undecided
GBAO (D) (Note: Poll sponsored by Kotek's campaign)	October 1–4, 2026	800 (LV)	± 3.5%	46%	42%	6%	6%
DHM Research (Note: Poll conducted on behalf of The Oregonian)	September 24 – October 1, 2026	549 (LV)	± 4.0%	46%	44%	3%	7%
DHM Research (Note: Poll conducted on behalf of Oregon Public Broadcasting)	September 17–27, 2026	915 (LV)	± 3.2%	46% (Note: With voters who lean towards a given candidate)	47%	3%	5%
DHM Research	September 17–27, 2026	915 (LV)	± 3.2%	44%	46%	3%	8%
DHM Research (Note: Poll conducted on behalf of Grow Oregon)	September 3–9, 2026	600 (LV)	± 4.0%	43%	45%	4%	13%
Public Opinion Strategies (R) (Note: Poll sponsored by Drazan's campaign)	June 22–24, 2026	600 (RV)	± 4.0%	44%	48%	—	8%
	May 19, 2026	Primary elections					
Hoffman Research Group (R) (Note: Poll sponsored by Dudley's campaign)	May 11–12, 2026	603 (LV)	± 4.0%	45%	45%	—	10%
FM3 Research (D) (Note: Poll commissioned by Charlie Health, an online behavioral health provider)	January 28 – February 4, 2026	1,065 (LV)	± 3.1%	45%	40%	—	15%

Hypothetical polling

Tina Kotek vs. Ed Diehl

Poll source	Date(s) administered	Sample size	Margin of error	Tina Kotek (D)	Ed Diehl (R)	Undecided
FM3 Research (D)	January 28 – February 4, 2026	1,065 (A)	± 3.1%	43%	37%	20%

Tina Kotek vs. Chris Dudley

Poll source	Date(s) administered	Sample size	Margin of error	Tina Kotek (D)	Chris Dudley (R)	Undecided
Hoffman Research Group (R)	May 11–12, 2026	603 (LV)	± 4.0%	44%	48%	9%
FM3 Research (D)	January 28 – February 4, 2026	1,065 (LV)	± 3.1%	45%	35%	20%

=== Results ===
2026 Oregon gubernatorial election
Party	Candidate	Votes	%	±%
Democratic	Tina Kotek (incumbent)			
Republican	Christine Drazan			
Pacific Green	Brett Smith			
Write-in				
Total votes			100.0	N/A

Counties that flipped from Republican to Democratic

- Clackamas (largest municipality: Lake Oswego)
- Deschutes (largest municipality: Bend)

== See also ==
- 2026 United States elections
- 2026 Oregon elections
- 2026 United States Senate election in Oregon
- 2026 United States House of Representatives elections

== Notes ==
Partisan clients
