= Michael Welsh (Oregon politician) =

Member-elect of the Oregon House of Representatives from the 21st district
- Assuming office January 11, 2027
- Succeeding: Kevin Mannix

Personal details
- Party: Democratic

Michael Welsh is an American politician and occupational safety professional who was elected to the Oregon House of Representatives representing Oregon's 21st House district in the 2026 Oregon House election.

A Democrat, he defeated two-term incumbent Kevin Mannix. Welsh is married with two children and lives in Keizer.
