= Amanda Staehely =

Member-elect of the Oregon House of Representatives from the 18th district
- Assuming office January 11, 2027
- Succeeding: Rick Lewis

Personal details
- Party: Republican

Amanda Staehely is a state legislator in Oregon. A Republican, she was elected from District 18 to the Oregon House of Representatives in 2026. She runs a plant nursery with her husband. She succeeded Rick Lewis.

She was born in Oregon and graduated from Canby High School.

== See also ==
- 2026 Oregon House of Representatives election
