= Oregon's 44th House district =

Legislative districts in the state of Oregon

Oregon's 44th House district after redistricting after the 2020 Census

District 44 of the Oregon House of Representatives is one of 60 House legislative districts in the state of Oregon. As of 2021, the district is contained entirely within Multnomah County and covers parts of north and northeast Portland, including the Portland International Airport. The current representative for the district is Democrat Travis Nelson of Portland.

== Election results ==
District boundaries have changed over time. Therefore, representatives before 2021 may not represent the same constituency as today. General election results from 2000 to present are as follows:

| Year | Candidate | Party | Percent | Opponent | Party | Percent | Opponent | Party | Percent | Write-in percentage |
|---|---|---|---|---|---|---|---|---|---|---|
| 2000 | Al King | Democratic | 52.54% | Ed Kemp | Republican | 47.46% | No third candidate | | | |
| 2002 (Note: Gary Hansen was the incumbent in this election. He previously represented District 17, but was moved to this district due to redistricting following the 2000 United States census.) | Gary Hansen | Democratic | 77.89% | Martin Kennedy | Constitution | 12.52% | Thomas Albright | Socialist | 8.01% | 1.58% |
| 2004 | Gary Hansen | Democratic | 79.88% | Aaron Huddart | Republican | 17.57% | Robert Morton | Constitution | 2.55% | |
| 2006 | Tina Kotek | Democratic | 78.82% | Jay Kushner | Republican | 20.64% | No third candidate | | | 0.55% |
| 2008 | Tina Kotek | Democratic | 97.64% | Unopposed | | | | | | 2.39% |
| 2010 | Tina Kotek | Democratic | 80.87% | Kitty Harmon | Republican | 18.77% | No third candidate | | | 0.36% |
| 2012 | Tina Kotek | Democratic | 86.32% | Michael Harrington | Republican | 13.21% | No third candidate | | | 0.47% |
| 2014 | Tina Kotek | Democratic | 85.53% | Michael Harrington | Republican | 13.64% | No third candidate | | | 0.84% |
| 2016 | Tina Kotek | Democratic | 79.67% | Joe Rowe | Pacific Green | 19.50% | No third candidate | | | 0.82% |
| 2018 | Tina Kotek | Democratic | 89.07% | Manny Guerra | Libertarian | 10.42% | No third candidate | | | 0.51% |
| 2020 | Tina Kotek | Democratic | 87.19% | Logan Margo | Republican | 12.47% | No third candidate | | | 0.34% |
| 2022 | Travis Nelson (Note: Travis Nelson was the incumbent in this election. He was appointed to this seat on February 1, 2022 to replace Tina Kotek, who resigned to run for governor.) | Democratic | 87.65% | Rolf Schuler | Republican | 11.42% | Morgan Hinthorne | Constitution | 0.77% | 0.16% |
| 2024 | Travis Nelson | Democratic | 98.3% | Unopposed | | | | | | 1.7% |

== See also ==
- Oregon Legislative Assembly
- Oregon House of Representatives
