= Oregon's 11th House district =

Legislative districts in the state of Oregon

Oregon's 11th House district after redistricting after the 2020 Census

District 11 of the Oregon House of Representatives is one of 60 House legislative districts in the state of Oregon. As of 2021, the boundary for the district is located mostly within eastern Linn County with a small portion of southern Marion County and contains Lebanon, Sweet Home, and Brownsville. The current representative for the district is Republican Jami Cate of Lebanon.

== Election results ==
District boundaries have changed over time. Therefore, representatives before 2021 may not represent the same constituency as today. General election results from 2000 to present are as follows:

Year	Candidate	Party	Percent	Opponent	Party	Percent	Write-in percentage
2000	Mary Nolan	Democratic	69.91%	Joan Gardner	Republican	30.09%	
2002 (Note: Phil Barnhart was the incumbent in this election. He previously represented District 40, but was moved to this district due to redistricting following the 2000 United States census.)	Phil Barnhart	Democratic	62.36%	Robert Bolanos	Republican	37.57%	0.08%
2004	Phil Barnhart	Democratic	56.77%	Michael Spasaro	Republican	43.23%	
2006	Phil Barnhart	Democratic	61.82%	Jim Oakley	Republican	38.18%	
2008	Phil Barnhart	Democratic	97.42%	Unopposed			2.58%
2010	Phil Barnhart	Democratic	54.40%	Kelly Lovelace	Republican	45.36%	0.25%
2012	Phil Barnhart	Democratic	55.78%	Kelly Lovelace	Republican	43.93%	0.29%
2014	Phil Barnhart	Democratic	52.64%	Andy Petersen	Republican	47.06%	0.30%
2016	Phil Barnhart	Democratic	53.33%	Joe Potwora	Republican	46.45%	0.22%
2018	Marty Wilde	Democratic	56.92%	Mark Herbert	Republican	42.97%	0.11%
2020	Marty Wilde	Democratic	52.07%	Katie Boshart Glaser	Republican	47.75%	0.18%
2022	Jami Cate (Note: Jami Cate was the incumbent in this election. She previously represented District 17, but was moved to this district due to redistricting following the 2020 United States census.)	Republican	74.50%	Mary Cooke	Democratic	25.32%	0.18%
2024	Jami Cate	Republican	73.8%	Ivan Maluski	Independent	25.9%	0.3%

== See also ==
- Oregon Legislative Assembly
- Oregon House of Representatives
