= Oregon's 50th House district =

Legislative districts in the state of Oregon

Oregon's 50th House district after redistricting after the 2020 Census

District 50 of the Oregon House of Representatives is one of 60 House legislative districts in the state of Oregon. As of 2021, the district is contained entirely within Multnomah County and includes most of Gresham south of Stark Street as well as a small portion of east Portland in the Centennial neighborhood. The current representative for the district is Democrat Ricki Ruiz of Gresham.

== Election results ==
District boundaries have changed over time. Therefore, representatives before 2021 may not represent the same constituency as today. General election results from 2000 to present are as follows:

Year	Candidate	Party	Percent	Opponent	Party	Percent	Opponent	Party	Percent	Write-in percentage
2000	Rob Patridge	Republican	62.25%	Barbara Davidson	Democratic	37.75%	No third candidate			
2002 (Note: Laurie Monnes Anderson was the incumbent in this election. She previously represented District 22, but was moved to this district due to redistricting following the 2000 United States census.)	Laurie Monnes Anderson	Democratic	60.80%	Ernest Hodgin	Republican	38.70%	No third candidate			0.50%
2004	John Lim	Republican	52.31%	Jim Buck	Democratic	47.69%	No third candidate			
2006	John Lim	Republican	62.87%	Jill Selman-Ringer	Democratic	33.78%	Brian Lowery	Libertarian	3.08%	0.27%
2008	Greg Matthews	Democratic	54.54%	John Lim	Republican	45.18%	No third candidate			0.28%
2010	Greg Matthews	Democratic	53.97%	Andre Wang	Republican	45.79%	No third candidate			0.24%
2012	Greg Matthews	Democratic	66.00%	Logan Boettcher	Republican	33.52%	No third candidate			0.48%
2014	Carla Piluso	Democratic	54.75%	Dan Chriestenson	Republican	44.69%	No third candidate			0.55%
2016	Carla Piluso	Democratic	50.25%	Stella Armstrong	Republican	30.79%	Michael Calcagno	Independent	18.82%	0.14%
2018	Carla Piluso	Democratic	93.83%	Unopposed						6.17%
2020	Ricki Ruiz	Democratic	53.59%	Amelia Salvador	Republican	46.29%	No third candidate			0.12%
2022	Ricki Ruiz	Democratic	51.78%	Amelia Salvador	Republican	48.13%	No third candidate			0.09%
2024	Ricki Ruiz	Democratic	54.5%	Paul Drechsler	Republican	45.2%	No third candidate			0.2%

== See also ==
- Oregon Legislative Assembly
- Oregon House of Representatives
