= Oregon's 28th House district =

Legislative districts in the state of Oregon

Oregon's 28th House district after redistricting after the 2020 Census

District 28 of the Oregon House of Representatives is one of 60 House legislative districts in the state of Oregon. As of 2021, the boundary for the district contains portions of Multnomah and Washington counties. The district includes Raleigh Hills, Garden Home, Hillsdale, and parts of southwestern and downtown Portland, including Portland State University. The current representative for the district is Dacia Grayber of Portland.

== Election results ==
District boundaries have changed over time. Therefore, representatives before 2021 may not represent the same constituency as today. General election results from 2000 to present are as follows:

Year	Candidate	Party	Percent	Opponent	Party	Percent	Opponent	Party	Percent	Write-in percentage
2000	Tootie Smith	Republican	59.82%	Mike Clarke	Democratic	40.18%	No third candidate			
2002	Jeff Barker	Democratic	48.02%	Keith Parker	Republican	47.77%	Mark Vetanen	Libertarian	3.98%	0.23%
2004	Jeff Barker	Democratic	82.70%	Steve Geiger	Pacific Green	17.30%	No third candidate			
2006	Jeff Barker	Democratic	64.55%	Eldon Derville-Teer	Republican	34.95%	No third candidate			0.50%
2008	Jeff Barker	Democratic	96.16%	Unopposed						3.84%
2010	Jeff Barker	Democratic	56.93%	Bill Berg	Republican	42.85%	No third candidate			0.22%
2012	Jeff Barker	Democratic	60.57%	Manuel Castaneda	Republican	39.20%	No third candidate			0.22%
2014	Jeff Barker	Democratic	80.67%	Lars Hedbor	Libertarian	18.27%	No third candidate			1.07%
2016	Jeff Barker	Democratic	64.07%	Gary Carlson	Republican	35.51%	No third candidate			0.42%
2018	Jeff Barker	Democratic	84.23%	Lars Hedbor	Libertarian	14.91%	No third candidate			0.86%
2020	Wlnsvey Campos	Democratic	65.15%	Martin Daniel	Republican	34.63%	No third candidate			0.22%
2022 (Note: Dacia Grayber was the incumbent in this election. She previously represented District 35, but was moved to this district due to redistricting following the 2020 United States Census.)	Dacia Grayber	Democratic	81.98%	Patrick Castles	Republican	17.92%	No third candidate			0.10%
2024	Dacia Grayber	Democratic	85.8%	Charles Mengis	Republican	14.0%	No third candidate			0.2%

== See also ==
- Oregon Legislative Assembly
- Oregon House of Representatives
