= Oregon's 2nd House district =

Legislative district in the state of Oregon

Oregon's 2nd House district after redistricting after the 2020 Census

District 2 of the Oregon House of Representatives is one of 60 House legislative districts in the state of Oregon. As of 2021, the district covers most of Douglas County. The current representative for the district is Republican Virgle Osborne of Roseburg.

== Election results ==
District boundaries have changed over time. Therefore, representatives before 2021 may not represent the same constituency as today. General election results from 2000 to present are as follows:

Year	Candidate	Party	Percent	Opponent	Party	Percent	Opponent	Party	Percent	Write-in percentage
2000	Elaine Hopson	Democratic	58.13%	Diane Waldron	Republican	41.87%	No third candidate			
2002 (Note: Susan Morgan was the incumbent in this election. She previously represented District 46, but was moved to this district due to redistricting following the 2000 United States census.)	Susan Morgan	Republican	73.93%	Bruce Conk	Democratic	25.70%	No third candidate			0.37%
2004	Susan Morgan	Republican	71.38%	Linda Mongkeya	Democratic	28.62%	No third candidate			
2006	Susan Morgan	Republican	97.41%	Unopposed						2.59%
2008	Tim Freeman	Republican	64.50%	Harry McDermott	Democratic	35.15%	No third candidate			0.35%
2010	Tim Freeman	Republican	71.98%	Harry McDermott	Democratic	27.70%	No third candidate			0.32%
2012	Tim Freeman	Republican	76.91%	Jeff Adams	Libertarian	22.28%	No third candidate			0.81%
2014	Dallas Heard	Republican	62.66%	Kerry Atherton	Democratic	31.37%	Jeff Adams	Libertarian	5.65%	0.32%
2016	Dallas Heard	Republican	97.51%	Unopposed						2.49%
2018 (Note: Gary Leif was the incumbent in this election. He was appointed to this seat on April 30, 2018 to replace Dallas Heard, who resigned to take an appointment to the District 1 seat in the Oregon Senate.)	Gary Leif	Republican	66.11%	Megan Salter	Democratic	33.63%	No third candidate			0.27%
2020	Gary Leif	Republican	71.62%	Charles F. Lee	Democratic	28.09%	No third candidate			0.30%
2022	Virgle Osborne	Republican	70.06%	Kevin Bell	Democratic	27.20%	Edward Renfroe	Constitution	2.51%	0.23%
2024	Virgle Osborne	Republican	71.2%	August Warren	Democratic	28.5%	No third candidate			0.3%

== See also ==
- Oregon Legislative Assembly
- Oregon House of Representatives
