= Farrah Chaichi =

American politician

Member of the Oregon House of Representatives from the 35th district
- Incumbent
- Assumed office January 9, 2023
- Preceded by: Dacia Grayber (Redistricting)

Personal details
- Party: Democratic
- Education: Seattle University (BA); George Washington; University (MPS)

Farrah Chaichi is an American politician and activist serving as a member of the Oregon House of Representatives for the 35th district. Elected in November 2022, she assumed office on January 9, 2023.

== Education ==
After graduating from Beaverton High School, Chaichi earned a Bachelor of Arts degree in criminal justice and political science from Seattle University and a Master of Professional Studies in paralegal studies from George Washington University.

== Career ==
As a student, Chaichi worked as a sales associate at a Dollar Tree location. She also worked in compliance for Daimler Truck before joining Stoel Rives as a client intake coordinator. Chaichi served as a member of the Beaverton Human Rights Advisory Commission from 2014 to 2019. She was elected to the Oregon House of Representatives in November 2022. She is a member of the Democratic Socialists of America.

== Political Positions ==
=== Immigration ===
Chaichi introduced HB 4138 — the Law Enforcement Accountability and Visibility Act (LEAVA), which requires law enforcement operating in Oregon, including United States Immigration and Customs Enforcement, to require officers to wear uniforms with specified identifying information and to enact policies prohibiting the wearing of facial coverings by officers except in specified circumstances. It requires all volunteers serving in civil defense forces are subject to the same Oregon Sanctuary Law requirements as public employees.

In a press release about LEAVA, Chaichi said, "This bill will meaningfully work to protect scared Oregonians by establishing uniform, minimum standards for all law enforcement operating in Oregon — local, state, and federal — so authority is visible, accountable, and transparent."

=== Drugs ===
Chaichi voted against criminalizing fentanyl, being the only member of the 82nd Oregon Legislative Assembly to vote against it.

=== Foreign Policy ===
Chaichi has spoken out against the Gaza war, calling for a ceasefire and calling it an “ethnic cleansing of Palestinians.”

== Personal life ==
Chaichi is of Middle Eastern descent. She describes herself as an atheist. She identifies as queer.

== Electoral history ==
2022 Oregon State Representative, 35th district
Party	Candidate	Votes	%
Democratic	Farrah Chaichi	14,365	67.2
Republican	Daniel R Martin	6,963	32.6
Write-in		58	0.3
Total votes		21,386	100%

2024 Oregon State Representative, 35th district
Party	Candidate	Votes	%
Democratic	Farrah Chaichi	17,072	69.0
Republican	Dan Martin	7,631	30.8
Write-in		45	0.2
Total votes		24,748	100%
