= Lucetta Elmer =

American politician

Minority Leader of the Oregon House of Representatives
- Incumbent
- Assumed office October 1, 2025
- Preceded by: Christine Drazan

Member of the Oregon House of Representatives from the 24th district
- Incumbent
- Assumed office January 9, 2023
- Preceded by: Ron Noble

Personal details
- Born: McMinnville, Oregon, U.S.
- Party: Republican
- Education: Linfield University (BS)
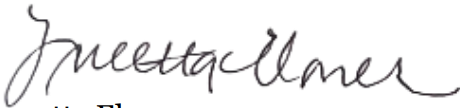
- Signature

Lucetta A. Elmer is an American politician and businesswoman serving as a member of the Oregon House of Representatives for the 24th district. Elected in November 2022, she assumed office on January 9, 2023. Since October 1, 2025, she has served as minority leader of the House.

== Early life and education ==
Elmer was born and raised in McMinnville, Oregon. She earned a Bachelor of Science degree in elementary education from Linfield University.

== Career ==
Elmer is the owner and managing partner of Douglas on Third, a boutique hotel. She also owns and operates Union Block Coffee. She was elected to the Oregon House of Representatives in November 2022.

== Electoral history ==
2022 Oregon State Representative, 24th district
| Party | Candidate | Votes | % |
|---|---|---|---|
| Republican | Lucetta A Elmer | 17,030 | 56.2 |
| Democratic | Victoria Ernst | 13,216 | 43.6 |
| Write-in | | 43 | 0.1 |
| Total votes | | 30,289 | 100% |

2024 Oregon State Representative, 24th district
| Party | Candidate | Votes | % |
|---|---|---|---|
| Republican | Lucetta A Elmer | 20,798 | 59.6 |
| Democratic | Lisa Pool | 14,033 | 40.2 |
| Write-in | | 55 | 0.2 |
| Total votes | | 34,886 | 100% |

Oregon House of Representatives
| Preceded by Christine Drazan | Minority Leader of the Oregon House of Representatives; 2025–present | Incumbent |
