= Virgle Osborne =

American politician

Virgle J. Osborne

Minority Whip of the Oregon House of Representatives
- Incumbent
- Assumed office November 20, 2024
- Preceded by: Kim Wallan

Member of the Oregon House of Representatives from the 2nd district
- Incumbent
- Assumed office January 9, 2023
- Preceded by: Christine Goodwin

Personal details
- Born: Roseburg, Oregon, U.S.
- Party: Republican
- Spouse: Toni Osborne

Virgle J. Osborne is an American Republican politician currently serving the 2nd district in the Oregon House of Representatives. The district includes Roseburg, Sutherlin, Glide, Myrtle Creek and others. He was elected to this position on November 8, 2022, in the 2022 election against Democratic opponent Rainey S. Lambert and Constitution opponent Edward Remfroe.

== Early life and business career ==
Osborne was born in Roseburg, Oregon and raised in Winston, Oregon. After attending Umpqua Community College, he moved to Santa Cruz, California to pursue a career in sales, though he returned to Oregon in 1995. That year, he founded Twin Peaks Off Road, an off-roading vehicle business.

Osborne served in management in the Roseburg Lumber Company, management in a Carquest dealership, holding the position of West Coast Sales Manager with Franklin International Adhesives, and then becoming a senior account manager with FCC Commercial Furniture He also founded Champagne Creek Ranch, a nonprofit organization.

== Political career ==
Osborne served on the Winston Planning Commission. He then served as the Douglas County Planning Commission chairman until he announced his Oregon House of Representatives candidacy in June 2021. In the 2022 election, Osborne won a seat representing the 2nd district, defeating Democratic nominee Kevin Bell with 70 percent of the vote.

=== Committees ===
He serves on three committees in the legislature:

- House Committee On Economic Development
- House Committee On Business and Labor
- House Committee On Climate, Energy, and Environment

== Political positions ==
=== Immigration ===
Following the Standoff at Eagle Pass, Osborne signed a letter in support of Texas Governor Greg Abbott's decision in the conflict.

=== Transportation ===
Osborne has expressed opposition to funding public transport like Portland's TriMet, citing poor conditions and results despite current levels of funding.

== Personal life ==
Osborne is mixed-race, with a Black father and a white mother.

== Electoral history ==
2022 Oregon State Representative, 2nd district
Party	Candidate	Votes	%
Republican	Virgle J Osborne	23,500	70.1
Democratic	Kevin Bell	9,123	27.2
Constitution	Edward Renfroe	841	2.5
Write-in		78	0.2
Total votes		33,542	100%

2024 Oregon State Representative, 2nd district
Party	Candidate	Votes	%
Republican	Virgle J Osborne	26,774	71.2
Democratic	August Warren	10,736	28.5
Write-in		111	0.3
Total votes		37,621	100%

Oregon House of Representatives
Preceded by Christine Goodwin	Member of the Oregon House of Representatives from the 2nd district 2023–	Succeeded by Incumbent
