= Ricki Ruiz =

American politician and community organizer

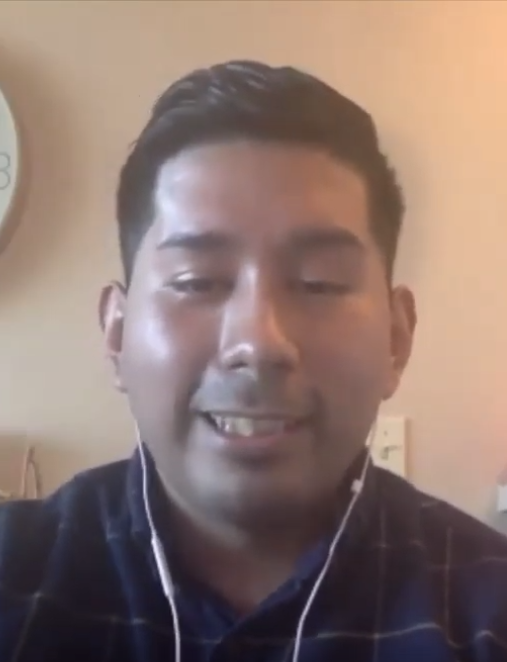

Member of the Oregon House of Representatives from the 50th district
- Incumbent
- Assumed office January 11, 2021
- Preceded by: Carla Piluso

Personal details
- Born: Ricardo Ruiz Madrigal; 1993 or 1994 (age 31–32) Portland, Oregon, U.S.
- Party: Democratic
- Education: Warner Pacific University (BA); Southern New Hampshire University (MBA)
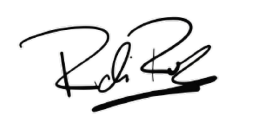
- Signature

Ricardo "Ricki" Ruiz Madrigal (born 1993 or 1994) is an American politician and community organizer serving as a member of the Oregon House of Representatives from the 50th district.

== Early life and education ==
Born in Portland, Oregon and raised in nearby Gresham, Ruiz graduated from the Reynolds School District in 2012 and later earned a Bachelor of Arts degree in social entrepreneurship from Warner Pacific University. He then earned a Master of Business Administration from Southern New Hampshire University. Prior to entering politics, Ruiz has worked as a community organizer and as a community services coordinator for the city of Gresham.

== Oregon House of Representatives ==
In the 2020 Oregon House of Representatives election, Ruiz defeated legislative aid William Miller in the Democratic primary. Ruiz then defeated Republican realtor Amelia Salvador in the general election.

In the 2022 election, Ruiz ran unopposed in the primary election. The general election, a rematch between Ruiz and Salvador, resulted in Ruiz winning again, though by a smaller margin. During his second term he became the youngest member of the House in 2023 at the age of 28.

=== Committees ===
- House Interim Committee On Higher Education (vice chair)
- Joint Interim Committee On Ways and Means Subcommittee On Education
- House Interim Committee On Economic Development and Small Business

Ruiz is also a member of the House BIPOC Caucus.

== Personal life ==
Ruiz lives in the Rockwood neighborhood of Gresham and is a father.

== Electoral history ==
2020 Oregon State Representative, 50th district
Party	Candidate	Votes	%
Democratic	Ricki Ruiz	15,662	53.6
Republican	Amelia Salvador	13,526	46.3
Write-in		35	0.1
Total votes		29,223	100%

2022 Oregon State Representative, 50th district
Party	Candidate	Votes	%
Democratic	Ricki Ruiz	12,157	51.8
Republican	Amelia Salvador	11,298	48.1
Write-in		21	0.1
Total votes		23,476	100%

2024 Oregon State Representative, 50th district
Party	Candidate	Votes	%
Democratic	Ricki Ruiz	15,014	54.5
Republican	Paul Drechsler	12,448	45.2
Write-in		67	0.2
Total votes		27,529	100%
