= Cyrus Javadi =

American politician

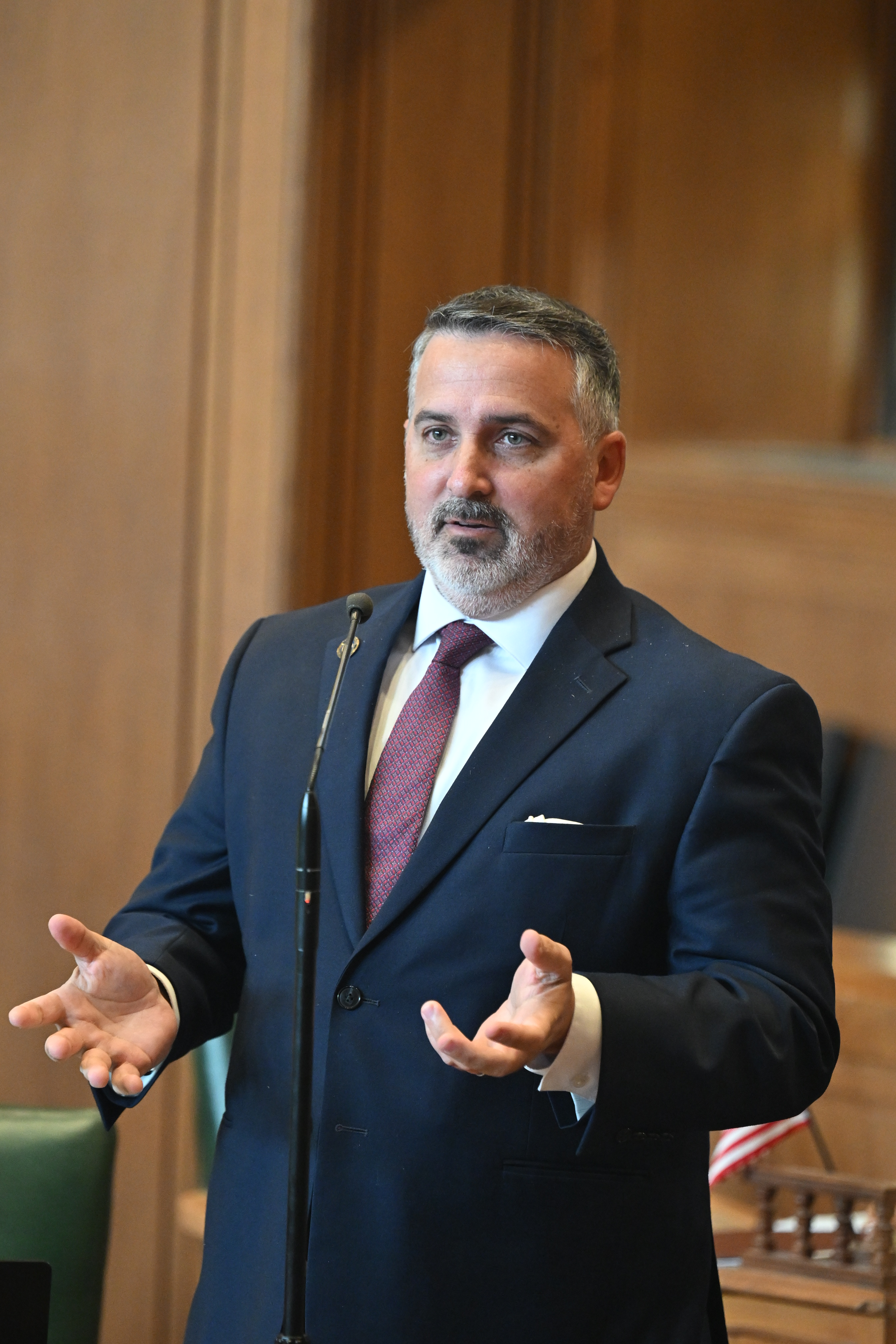
- Javadi in 2024

Member of the Oregon House of Representatives from the 32nd district
- Incumbent
- Assumed office January 9, 2023
- Preceded by: Suzanne Weber

Personal details
- Born: 1976 or 1977 (age 48–49) Provo, Utah, U.S.
- Party: Republican (before 2025); Democratic (2025–present)
- Spouse: Mollie
- Children: 9
- Education: Brigham Young University (BS); University of the Pacific (DDS)
- Javadi's voice Javadi at a session of the House Committee on Behavioral Health and Health Care. Recorded February 22, 2024

Cyrus Javadi (born 1977) is an American dentist and politician serving as a member of the Oregon House of Representatives for the 32nd district. First elected as a Republican in 2022 and re-elected in 2024, Javadi switched his party registration to the Democratic Party in September 2025, citing policy differences and evolving district priorities.

== Career ==
Javadi earned a Bachelor of Science degree in accounting from Brigham Young University in 2002, and a Doctor of Dental Surgery degree from the University of the Pacific in 2008.

After dental school, he began practicing in Oregon and moved to the coast in 2008. Following a brief period in Texas due to economic conditions, he returned to Oregon and purchased a private dental practice in Tillamook in 2012. He has served as the Dental Director for the Tillamook County Health Department and as a commissioner on the Port of Tillamook Bay Commission. His practice focuses on general dentistry and rural care access.

Javadi was elected to the Oregon House of Representatives in 2022 and re-elected in 2024. On September 5, 2025, he switched his party affiliation from Republican to Democrat. He cited concerns about blanket anti-tax positions and policies restricting speech or limiting access to public information, including a Republican-backed proposal that would have limited school library content. He announced he would seek re-election in 2026 as a Democrat.

== Electoral history ==
2022 Oregon State Representative, 32nd district
| Party | Candidate | Votes | % |
|---|---|---|---|
| Republican | Cyrus B Javadi | 17,846 | 51.2 |
| Democratic | Logan C Laity | 17,002 | 48.7 |
| Write-in | | 41 | 0.1 |
| Total votes | | 34,889 | 100% |

2024 Oregon State Representative, 32nd district
| Party | Candidate | Votes | % |
|---|---|---|---|
| Republican | Cyrus B Javadi | 20,409 | 52.1 |
| Democratic | Andy Davis | 18,692 | 47.7 |
| Write-in | | 68 | 0.2 |
| Total votes | | 39,169 | 100% |

== See also ==
- List of party switchers in the United States
