= Matt Bunch =

American politician

Member of the Oregon House of Representatives from the 51st district
- Incumbent
- Assumed office November 17, 2025
- Preceded by: Christine Drazan

Personal details
- Born: 1959 (age 66–67) Baker City, Oregon
- Party: Republican
- Education: Oregon State University

Matt Bunch is an American Republican politician currently serving in the Oregon House of Representatives. He represents the 51st district, located in central Clackamas County.

== Career ==
In retirement, Bunch worked as a school bus driver in Oregon City and owns a small insurance business. He spent most of his career working in insurance as well as a short stint as development director for the Oregon FFA Foundation.

He serves as president of the Clackamas County Fair Board and the associate director of the Clackamas County Soil and Water Conservation District and formerly served as president of the Clackamas County Farm Bureau.

Bunch ran for the Oregon House of Representatives in 2024, but ultimately dropped out of the primary after Christine Drazan announced her candidacy. He was later unanimously appointed by the Clackamas County Commission to finish Drazan's term in the House on November 17, 2025, beating out realtor and former county commission candidate Dana Hindman-Allen and former Sandy Mayor Carl Exner.

== Personal life ==
Bunch is from Baker, Oregon and attended Burnt River High School in Unity and Oregon State University in Corvallis. He was a member of the Phi Kappa Psi fraternity. He is a Knight of Columbus.

Bunch is married. He has 3 children and 5 grandchildren.
