= Otis, Oregon =

Unincorporated community in the state of Oregon, United States

- Unincorporated community
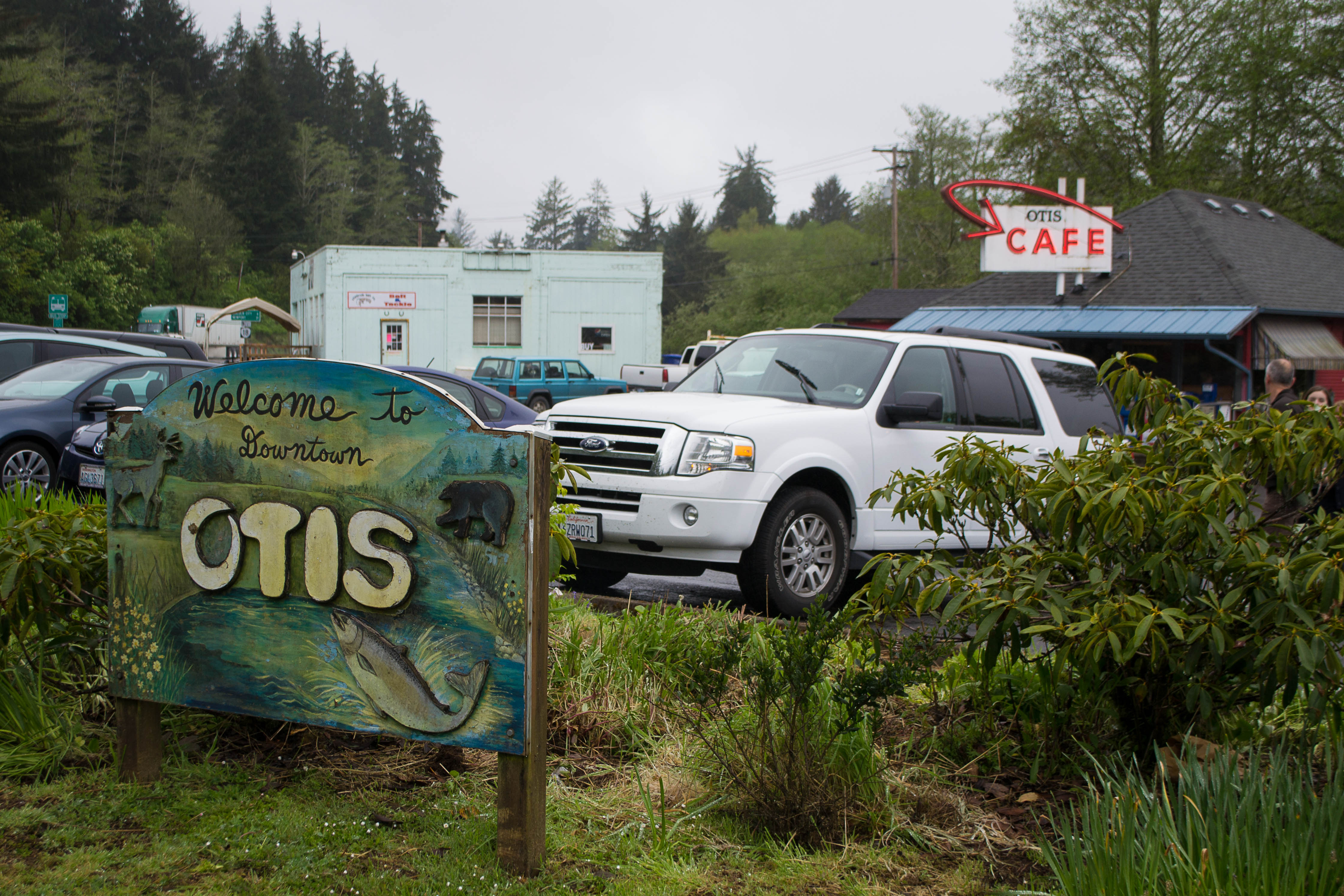
- Otis Junction, Oregon

- Location within Oregon Location within the United States
- Coordinates: 45°01′28″N 123°56′43″W
- Country: United States
- State: Oregon
- County: Lincoln County
- Named for: Otis Thompson
- Elevation: 46 ft (14 m)
- ZIP code: 97368

Otis is an unincorporated community in Lincoln County, Oregon, United States, a half mile north of Otis Junction on Oregon Route 18. It is near the Salmon River.

Otis post office was established in 1900 and was named after Otis Thompson, nephew of Archibald S. Thompson, the postmaster.

U.S. Route 101 used to pass through Otis until a curvy and hilly section of road was rerouted in the 1960s. Otis Junction is at the intersection of the former terminus of Oregon Route 18 and the former alignment of U.S. 101.

The Sitka Center for Art and Ecology has an Otis mailing address but is located nearer to the coast on Cascade Head. The Otis ZIP code, 97368, also covers the community of Rose Lodge. Today Otis and Otis Junction are considered synonymous.

Otis made the national headlines in 1999 and again in 2004, when it was announced that the town was for sale for $3 million. The news stories describe the Otis Café and other amenities that are at Otis Junction; it is unclear if the 193 acres (0.78 km^{2}) that were for sale included the land in Otis proper. Owner Vivian Lematta's grandfather bought the land from descendants of the Siletz Indians for $800 in 1910. Lematta left Otis in 1957. Included in the sale were the gas station and mini grocery store, a Pronto Pup corn dog stand, two houses, an empty 25-stall horse barn, a helicopter storage shed, a garage, a Grange hall, the Otis post office, the Otis Café, an auto-repair garage and 190 acres (0.77 km^{2}) of farmland. Part of the land was used for raising cattle and part was undergoing timber conservation.

== Climate ==
This region experiences warm (but not hot) and dry summers, with no average monthly temperatures above 71.6 °F (22.0 °C). According to the Köppen Climate Classification system, Otis has a warm-summer Mediterranean climate, abbreviated "Csb" on climate maps.

Climate data for Otis, Oregon (1991–2020 normals, extremes 1948–2023)
Month	Jan	Feb	Mar	Apr	May	Jun	Jul	Aug	Sep	Oct	Nov	Dec	Year
Record high °F (°C)	65 (18)	72 (22)	78 (26)	84 (29)	97 (36)	96 (36)	96 (36)	100 (38)	92 (33)	86 (30)	76 (24)	64 (18)	99 (37)
Mean daily maximum °F (°C)	48.5 (9.2)	51.5 (10.8)	55.1 (12.8)	58.6 (14.8)	63.2 (17.3)	66.4 (19.1)	71.0 (21.7)	72.3 (22.4)	70.0 (21.1)	61.3 (16.3)	52.7 (11.5)	47.7 (8.7)	59.9 (15.5)
Daily mean °F (°C)	43.1 (6.2)	44.6 (7.0)	47.0 (8.3)	49.7 (9.8)	54.0 (12.2)	57.4 (14.1)	61.1 (16.2)	61.9 (16.6)	59.6 (15.3)	53.2 (11.8)	46.7 (8.2)	42.4 (5.8)	51.7 (10.9)
Mean daily minimum °F (°C)	37.7 (3.2)	37.8 (3.2)	38.8 (3.8)	40.8 (4.9)	44.9 (7.2)	48.5 (9.2)	51.1 (10.6)	51.6 (10.9)	49.2 (9.6)	45.1 (7.3)	40.7 (4.8)	37.1 (2.8)	43.6 (6.4)
Record low °F (°C)	4 (−16)	11 (−12)	23 (−5)	27 (−3)	29 (−2)	35 (2)	35 (2)	39 (4)	32 (0)	23 (−5)	15 (−9)	4 (−16)	4 (−16)
Average precipitation inches (mm)	14.58 (370)	10.53 (267)	10.79 (274)	8.17 (208)	4.69 (119)	3.50 (89)	0.90 (23)	1.40 (36)	3.38 (86)	8.47 (215)	14.13 (359)	15.85 (403)	96.39 (2,448)
Average snowfall inches (cm)	0.1 (0.25)	0.0 (0.0)	0.0 (0.0)	0.0 (0.0)	0.0 (0.0)	0.0 (0.0)	0.0 (0.0)	0.0 (0.0)	0.0 (0.0)	0.0 (0.0)	0.0 (0.0)	0.0 (0.0)	0.1 (0.25)
Average precipitation days (≥ 0.01 in)	25.9	21.0	22.3	19.1	14.7	12.1	6.1	6.7	9.6	16.8	23.5	26.9	204.7
Average snowy days (≥ 0.1 in)	0.0	0.0	0.0	0.0	0.0	0.0	0.0	0.0	0.0	0.0	0.0	0.0	0.0
Source: NOAA
