= Jami Cate =

American politician

Member of the Oregon House of Representatives from the 11th district
- Incumbent
- Assumed office January 11, 2021
- Preceded by: Sherrie Sprenger

Member of the Oregon House of Representatives from the 17th district
- Preceded by: Marty Wilde
- Succeeded by: Ed Diehl

Personal details
- Born: 1986 or 1987 (age 38–39)
- Party: Republican
- Education: Oregon State University
- Occupation: Politician, farmer

Jami Cate (born 1986/87) is an American Republican politician and farmer serving as a member of the Oregon House of Representatives. She currently represents the 11th district, which covers parts of Linn County and Marion County, including the cities of Lebanon, Sweet Home, and Jefferson.

First elected to the legislature in 2020, she previously represented the 17th district, and assumed office in January 2021.

== Early life and education ==
Cate is a fifth-generation Linn County farmer, and grew up on a multi-generation farm family north of Lebanon, Oregon. She received her bachelor's degree from Oregon State University in Crop and Soil Science.

== Career ==
In 2020, after incumbent Sherrie Springer stepped down to run for the Linn County commission, Cate announced her candidacy for the Oregon House of Representatives' 17th district. She won the crowded Republican primary with 26.6% of the vote, or 2,903 votes, defeating Scott Sword by just 34 votes. She went on to win the November general election against Democratic candidate Paige Hook.

In 2022, following redistricting, Cate was drawn into the 11th District, where she ran for re-election and defeated Mary Cooke in the November general election.

In July 2025, Cate declared her candidacy for Oregon's 6th Senate district in 2026.

== Political positions ==
Following the Standoff at Eagle Pass, Cate signed a letter in support of Texas Governor Greg Abbott's decision in the conflict.

== Electoral history ==
2020 Oregon State Representative, 17th district
Party	Candidate	Votes	%
Republican	Jami Cate	26,398	69.2
Democratic	Paige Hook	10,988	28.8
Pacific Green	Timothy L Dehne	693	1.8
Write-in		60	0.2
Total votes		38,139	100%

2022 Oregon State Representative, 11th district
Party	Candidate	Votes	%
Republican	Jami Cate	24,892	74.5
Democratic	Mary K Cooke	8,458	25.3
Write-in		60	0.2
Total votes		33,410	100%

2024 Oregon State Representative, 11th district
Party	Candidate	Votes	%
Republican	Jami Cate	26,148	73.8
Independent	Ivan Maluski	9,159	25.9
Write-in		112	0.3
Total votes		35,419	100%
