= Ed Diehl =

American politician

Member of the Oregon House of Representatives from the 17th district
- Incumbent
- Assumed office January 9, 2023
- Preceded by: Jami Cate

Personal details
- Born: Plains, Montana, U.S.
- Party: Republican
- Spouse: Jamie Diehl
- Children: 2
- Education: Stanford University (BS, MS)
- Diehl's voice Diehl during a House Behavioral Health Committee session. Recorded February 22, 2024

Ed Diehl is an American engineer, businessman, and politician serving as a member of the Oregon House of Representatives from the 17th district since 2023. He is a member of the Republican Party.

Diehl lives in Scio, Oregon, with his wife, Jamie Diehl. They have two children. He has served on local nonprofit and community boards, including wildfire relief efforts, hospital governance, and faith‑based organizations. He was a candidate in the Republican primary for Oregon governor in 2026.

== Early life and education ==
Diehl was born in Plains, Montana. He graduated from Plains High School in 1983. He earned a B.S. in mechanical engineering from Stanford University in 1987 and a M.S. in mechanical engineering, specializing in smart product design, from Stanford in 1989.

== Career ==
Before entering politics, Diehl worked extensively in engineering, automation, and business management. He is a founder and former owner of Concept Systems, a control‑system integration firm based in Albany, Oregon, that provides industrial automation solutions to manufacturing clients in the United States and internationally. His work in the private sector included designing and implementing automated systems for industrial operations, managing engineering teams, and overseeing business development.

Diehl’s professional background also includes roles as an engineer and entrepreneur outside of Concept Systems, with experience in factory automation and efficiency improvement for manufacturing facilities.

In addition to his engineering and business work, Diehl is an instrument‑rated pilot and flies recreationally.

== Oregon House of Representatives ==
Diehl is a member of the Republican Party and represents District 17 in the Oregon House of Representatives, which includes East Salem, Turner, Detroit, and Idanha. He was first elected in 2022 and assumed office on January 9, 2023.

During the 2025 legislative session, he served on the following committees:

- House Behavioral Health and Health Care Committee
- House Economic Development and Small Business Committee (vice‑chair)
- House Conduct Committee
- Joint Ways and Means Subcommittee on Human Services

He was re‑elected in 2024, with his current term ending in 2027.

== Political positions ==
Diehl identifies as a conservative Republican. His stated priorities include forest management, support for small businesses, and reducing regulatory burdens. He has been critical of progressive policies adopted in Portland and emphasizes issues affecting rural communities.

== Advocacy and political organizing ==
In 2025, Diehl helped establish the Oregon Freedom Coalition (OFC), a political advocacy organization focused on tax policy, transportation funding, and government accountability. He serves as the organization’s president. Under OFC, Diehl supported and promoted campaigns opposing large-scale tax and fee increases proposed in statewide transportation legislation.

In June 2025, the Oregon Freedom Coalition launched No Tax Oregon, a statewide referendum effort opposing House Bill 2025, a transportation funding package projected to raise approximately $4 billion in new taxes and fees. The campaign sought to refer the bill to voters and mobilized volunteers to gather signatures across the state.

By late 2025, opponents of the transportation package—including No Tax Oregon—reported collecting more than 150,000 signatures, surpassing the roughly 78,000 required to qualify the referendum for the ballot. Commentators described the rapid signature‑gathering effort as unusually large and fast for a statewide referendum campaign.

== Electoral history ==
2022 Oregon State Representative, 17th district
Party	Candidate	Votes	%
Republican	Ed Diehl	21,741	96.7
Write-in		742	3.3
Total votes		22,483	100%

2024 Oregon State Representative, 17th district
Party	Candidate	Votes	%
Republican	Ed Diehl	23,759	69.3
Democratic	David W Beem	10,486	30.6
Write-in		52	0.2
Total votes		34,297	100%
