= Dacia Grayber =

American politician

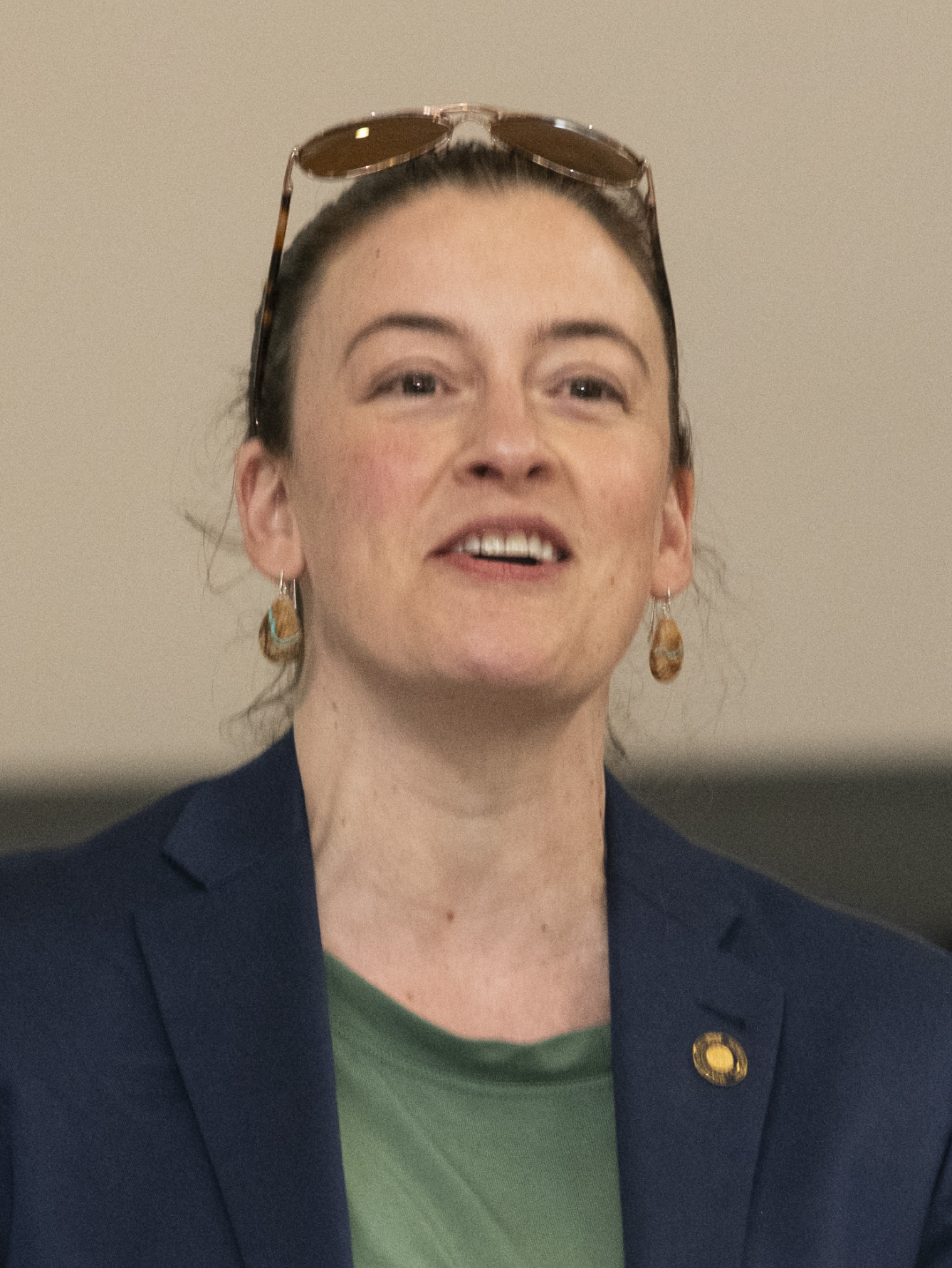

Member of the Oregon House of Representatives from the 28th district
- Incumbent
- Assumed office January 11, 2021
- Preceded by: Margaret Doherty

Personal details
- Party: Democratic
- Education: Concordia University (BS)
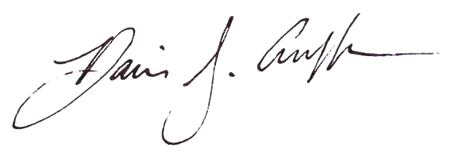
- Signature

Dacia Grayber is an American firefighter and politician serving as a member of the Oregon House of Representatives from the 28th district representing Tigard. She previously represented the 35th district from 2021 until 2023.

== Education ==
Grayber earned a Bachelor of Science degree in homeland security and emergency management from Concordia University.

== Career ==
Prior to entering politics, Grayber has worked as a firefighter and paramedic for Tualatin Valley Fire and Rescue. Grayber was elected to the Oregon House of Representatives in 2020 with 67.1% of the vote, defeating Republican businessman and engineer Bob Niemeyer. A Democrat, she also won the cross-nomination of the Working Families Party. Grayber was cited as part of a wave of frontline medical workers that were elected to office during the 2020 pandemic.

In June 2021, Grayber assisted Rep. Pam Marsh in passing a $190 million wildfire mitigation bill that established wildfire risk maps, programs to bolster recovery and adapt communities to smoke, and called for changes to buildings within the wildland–urban interface. Grayber also co-sponsored a bill with Rep. Rob Nosse allowing pharmacists to dispense and administer PrEP and PEP, an HIV medication, and giving further authority for them to conduct HIV tests.

In February 2022, Grayber was a sponsor of House Bill 4113, which expanded compensation protection for firefighters from cancer, adding coverage for bladder and female reproductive cancers.

== Personal life ==
Grayber identifies as a queer woman. They are Jewish

== Electoral history ==
2020 Oregon State Representative, 35th district
Party	Candidate	Votes	%
Democratic	Dacia Grayber	26,473	67.1
Republican	Bob Niemeyer	12,893	32.7
Write-in		71	0.2
Total votes		39,437	100%

2022 Oregon State Representative, 28th district
Party	Candidate	Votes	%
Democratic	Dacia Grayber	30,483	82.0
Republican	Patrick Castles	6,662	17.9
Write-in		39	0.1
Total votes		37,184	100%

2024 Oregon State Representative, 28th district
Party	Candidate	Votes	%
Democratic	Dacia Grayber	34,188	85.8
Republican	Charles (Chick) Mengis	5,575	14.0
Write-in		60	0.2
Total votes		39,823	100%
