= Annessa Hartman =

American politician

Member of the Oregon House of Representatives from the 40th district
- Incumbent
- Assumed office January 9, 2023
- Preceded by: Mark Meek

Member of the Gladstone City Council, Position 4
- In office January 1, 2021 – January 9, 2023
- Preceded by: Neal Reisner
- Succeeded by: Andrew Labonte

Personal details
- Party: Democratic
- Education: Le Cordon Bleu College of Culinary Arts (AA)

Annessa Hartman is an American politician and activist serving as a member of the Oregon House of Representatives for the 40th district. Elected in November 2022, she assumed office on January 9, 2023.

== Education ==
Hartman earned an associate of arts degree in hotel and restaurant management from the Le Cordon Bleu College of Culinary Arts in Pasadena, California.

== Career ==
From 2008 to 2016, Hartman worked in catering in Los Angeles and Concord, California. She moved to Portland, Oregon, to work as an event planner at Portland Center Stage. Hartman worked as the catering director at Eurest USA and as a sales manager at Marriott from 2018 to 2020. From 2020 to 2022, Hartman worked as the marketplace and retail coordinator for the Native American Youth and Family Center. Hartman is also a chapter director at Unite Oregon.

She was elected to the Gladstone City Council in 2020 and the Oregon House of Representatives in November 2022. After voting against a contentious transportation bill in a special session, Hartman announced that she will not run for public office in 2026 due to her illness.

== Personal life ==
Hartman is a survivor of sexual assault and domestic violence. She has two daughters. She was diagnosed with cervical cancer in October 2025.

== Electoral history ==
=== 2024 ===
2024 Oregon House of Representatives, 40th district
Party	Candidate	Votes	%
Democratic	Annessa Hartman	20,658	55.8
Republican	Michael Steven Newgard	16,271	44.0
Write-in		60	0.2
Total votes		36,989	100%

=== 2022 ===
2022 Oregon House of Representatives 40th district election
Party	Candidate	Votes	%
Democratic	Annessa Hartman	16,632	50.22
Republican	Adam Baker	16,451	49.67
Write-in		35	0.11
Total votes		33,118	100.0

2022 Oregon House of Representatives 40th district Democratic primary
Party	Candidate	Votes	%
Democratic	Annessa Hartman	4,433	58.22
Democratic	Charles Gallia	2,363	31.03
Democratic	James Farley	766	10.06
Democratic	Write-in	52	0.68
Total votes		11,244	100.0

=== 2020 ===
2020 Gladstone City Council election, Position 4
Party	Candidate	Votes	%
Nonpartisan	Annessa Hartman	2,341	42.01
Nonpartisan	Bill Osburn	1,946	34.92
Nonpartisan	Scott Blessing	1,036	18.59
Nonpartisan	Mark A Horst	211	3.79
Write-in		38	0.68
Total votes		2,905	100.0

== See also ==
- List of Native American politicians
- Native American women in politics
