= Oregon Legislative Assembly =

Legislative branch of the state government of Oregon

- 83rd Oregon Legislative Assembly

Type
- Type: Bicameral
- Houses: Senate; House of Representatives

Leadership
- Senate President: Rob Wagner (D) since January 9, 2023
- House Speaker: Julie Fahey (D) since March 7, 2024

Structure
- Seats: 90 (60 in the House; 30 in the Senate)
- Senate political groups: Democratic (18); Republican (12)
- House of Representatives political groups: Democratic (37); Republican (23)
- Salary: $33,852 per year (Speaker of House and President of Senate receive $67,704 per year), as of 2022

Elections
- Last Senate election: November 5, 2024
- Last House of Representatives election: November 5, 2024
- Next Senate election: November 3, 2026
- Next House of Representatives election: November 3, 2026

Meeting place
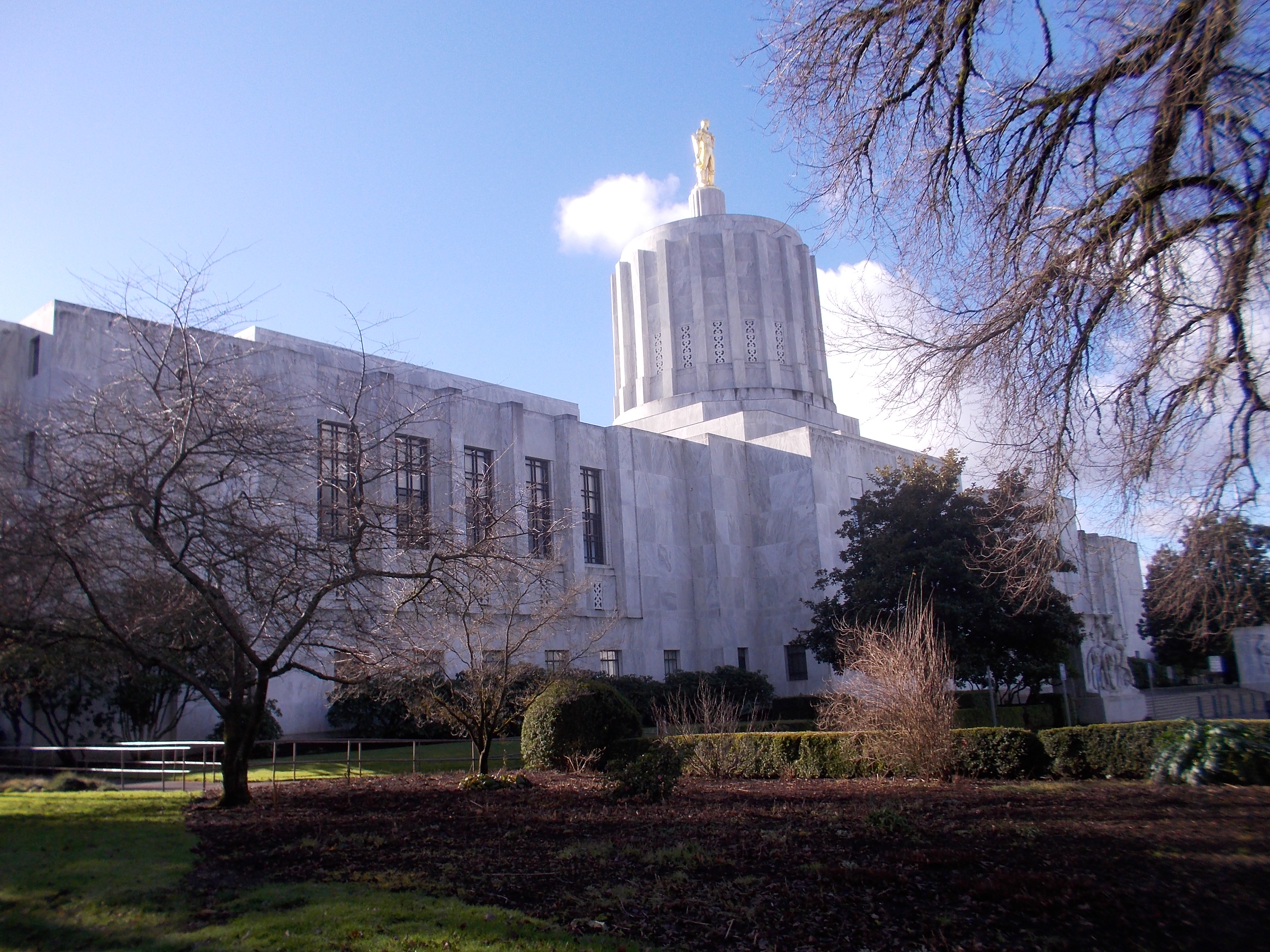
- Oregon State Capitol; Salem

Website
- http://www.oregonlegislature.gov/

The Oregon Legislative Assembly (Note: While "Legislative Assembly" is the constitutionally defined name, the legislative body is commonly referred to as the "Oregon State Legislature", including on the Legislative Assembly's own website.) is the state legislature for the U.S. state of Oregon. The Legislative Assembly is bicameral, consisting of an upper and lower chamber: the Senate, whose 30 members are elected to serve four-year terms; and the House of Representatives, with 60 members elected to two-year terms. There are no term limits for either chamber.

Each Senate district is composed of exactly two House districts: Senate District 1 contains House Districts 1 and 2, SD 2 contains HD 3 and HD 4, and so on. (Maps of Senate districts can be found in the Oregon State Senate article.) Senate districts contain about 127,700 people, and are redrawn every ten years.

The legislature is termed as a "citizens' assembly" (meaning that most legislators have other jobs). Since 1885, its regular sessions of up to 160 days occurred in odd-numbered years, beginning on the second Monday in January. Effective 2012, the legislature moved into an annual session, with the even-numbered years having a "short session" of 35 days or fewer, beginning in February.

== Bills ==
Bills may be introduced in either house, and must flow through a committee before being voted upon. Bills calling for increased revenue must be introduced in the House of Representatives.

== Sessions ==
A legislative resolution referred to voters in the November 2010 general election amended the state's constitution and changed the schedule of regular sessions from bi-annual to annual. Senate Joint Resolution 41 was voted on as state Ballot Measure 71, which passed statewide by a margin of more than 2 to 1.

With limited exceptions, the constitutional changes enacted through Measure 71 limit the length of legislative sessions beginning in odd-numbered years to 160 calendar days, and sessions beginning in even-numbered years to 35 calendar days. The changes took effect with the 2011 session.

The first 35 regular sessions (i.e. until 1929) lasted 50 days or less. Since 1949 no annual session was shorter than 100 days. The longest session was the 72nd regular session, at 227 days, ending August 27, 2003. More recent sessions ended in June or July.

The Governor of Oregon was the only person who could call the assembly into special sessions until 1976, when voters approved a constitutional amendment allowing the legislature to call itself into session. In either case, special sessions are permitted only "in the event of an emergency." Voters narrowly defeated a constitutional amendment in 1990 that would have established annual sessions.

In 1982 a special session lasted 37 days, and the governor called the assembly into special session five times in 2002, for a total of 52 days. The 2006 special session was the shortest in Oregon's history: five pieces of legislation were passed in only six hours. The legislative body may also call itself into special session "in the event of an emergency," although it has never done so.

The legislature's regular sessions were every two years until 2009. The legislative session in 2010 that referred Measure 71 to voters was a special session approved during the 2009 session by a majority of legislators, who were hoping to eventually win approval of a change to regular annual sessions. The push for annual sessions dates back to at least 1981, when a poll of legislators found that two-thirds favored a shift to annual sessions.

== Quorum ==
The Constitution of Oregon requires 3/5s vote in both houses in order to pass new taxes or increase existing ones. In addition, two-thirds of members of each house are required to form a quorum. Oregon Ballot Measure 113 was passed in 2022 to disqualify members with ten unexcused absences from serving in the legislature following their current term, largely in response to a series of walkouts by Republican senators.

== Interim ==
In the interim between legislative sessions, special study groups made up of state legislators with interests or expertise in the specific study areas investigate issues that will be addressed during the next legislative session. In addition, the state's legislative Emergency Board, which is jointly chaired by the President of the Senate and the Speaker of the House, can take action to provide additional funds to state agencies for activities required by law or that arise unexpectedly during the legislative interim.

== Legislator salary and compensation ==
The job of a member of the Legislative Assembly is considered a "part-time" job in Oregon, and is compensated accordingly. Legislators are paid $33,852 per year. Presiding officers (the Speaker of the House and Senate President) are compensated double, $67,704 per year. While in session, legislators also receive a $151 per diem.

In the 2022 Regular Session, at the request of the Asian Pacific American Network of Oregon (APANO) and Family Forward Oregon, a SB1566 was introduced to increase legislators pay. SB 1566 establishes an annual salary for members of the Legislative Assembly equal to the annual occupational mean wage estimate for Oregon in the prior year, as determined by the U.S. Department of Labor and the Oregon Employment Department. And it directs the salary to be adjusted to conform to the mean only once every two years. It also authorizes a child care allowance for members who have children or dependents under the age of 13.

Sen. Floyd Prozanski (D-Eugene) said at the hearing that the low pay deters Oregonians from serving in the Legislature and urged the new salary be approved. He said the current pay serves to encourage only those with personal wealth or with multiple jobs to run for the legislature. Because of the high time commitment legislative positions require, the current salary also makes it financially difficult for some to stay in office once they have been elected. Ultimately, SB1566 did not make it out of the Senate Rules Committee.

In light of this, three veteran House Democrats jointly announced they would not seek reelection because of the apparent failure of SB1566. The three state representatives, Karin Power, Rachel Prusak and Anna Williams, said they could not afford to work full time for part-time pay. "We are a lawyer, nurse practitioner, and social worker," the three said in a statement. "Seeing the hardships that families faced in our professional lives convinced us to run for office knowing these families deserved voices in our state government.

== See also ==
- List of Oregon Legislative Assemblies
- Oregon Territorial Legislature (pre-statehood legislature)
- Provisional Government of Oregon (pre-territorial governing body)
- Provisional Legislature of Oregon
