= Oregon's 17th House district =

Legislative districts in the state of Oregon

Oregon's 17th House district after redistricting after the 2020 Census

District 17 of the Oregon House of Representatives is one of 60 House legislative districts in the state of Oregon. As of 2021, the boundary for the district includes portions of Linn and Marion counties. The district includes Turner, Aumsville, Detroit, Lyons, Sublimity, Stayton, Mill City and eastern Salem as well as Corban University, the Santiam State Forest, and Mt. Jefferson. The current representative for the district is Republican Ed Diehl of Stayton.

== Election results ==
District boundaries have changed over time. Therefore, representatives before 2021 may not represent the same constituency as today. General election results from 2000 to present are as follows:

Year	Candidate	Party	Percent	Opponent	Party	Percent	Opponent	Party	Percent	Write-in percentage
2000	Gary Hansen	Democratic	88.49%	Thomas Albright	Socialist	11.51%	No third candidate			
2002 (Note: Jeff Kropf was the incumbent in this election. He previously represented District 37, but was moved to this district due to redistricting following the 2000 United States census.)	Jeff Kropf	Republican	68.78%	Donald Beale	Democratic	31.00%	No third candidate			0.22%
2004	Jeff Kropf	Republican	82.69%	Unopposed						17.31%
2006	Fred Girod	Republican	59.06%	Dan Thackaberry	Democratic	40.49%	No third candidate			0.45%
2008 (Note: Sherrie Sprenger was the incumbent in this election. She was appointed to this seat on February 1, 2008 to replace Fred Girod, who resigned to take an appointment to the District 9 seat in the Oregon Senate.)	Sherrie Sprenger	Republican	60.26%	Dan Thackaberry	Democratic	39.46%	No third candidate			0.28%
2010	Sherrie Sprenger	Republican	73.25%	Richard Harisay	Democratic	26.46%	No third candidate			0.29%
2012	Sherrie Sprenger	Republican	69.52%	Richard Harisay	Democratic	30.20%	No third candidate			0.28%
2014	Sherrie Sprenger	Republican	73.68%	Richard Harisay	Democratic	25.82%	No third candidate			0.50%
2016	Sherrie Sprenger	Republican	78.27%	Jeff Goodwin	Independent	21.10%	No third candidate			0.63%
2018	Sherrie Sprenger	Republican	71.18%	Renee Windsor-White	Democratic	28.58%	No third candidate			0.24%
2020	Jami Cate	Republican	69.22%	Paige Hook	Democratic	28.81%	Timothy Dehne	Pacific Green Party	1.82%	0.16%
2022	Ed Diehl	Republican	96.7%	Unopposed						3.3%
2024	Ed Diehl	Republican	69.3%	David Beem	Democratic	30.6%	No third candidate			0.2%

== See also ==
- Oregon Legislative Assembly
- Oregon House of Representatives
