= Oregon House of Representatives =

Lower house of the Oregon Legislative Assembly

- Oregon Legislative Assembly
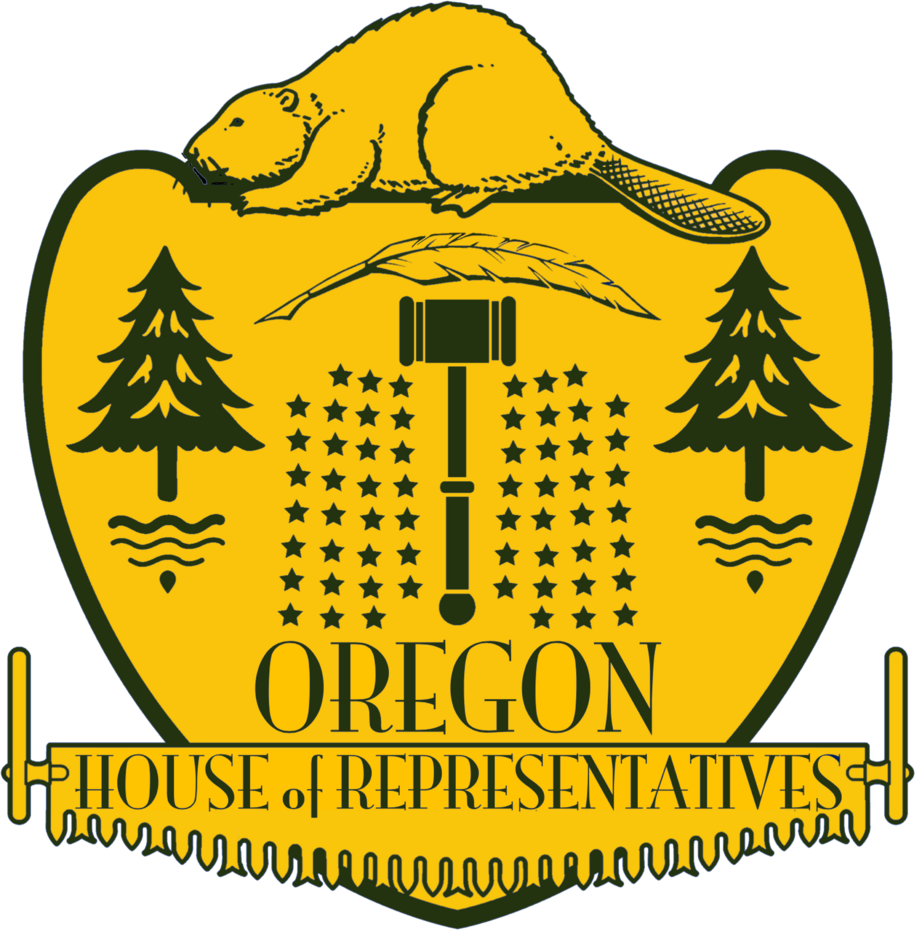

Type
- Type: Lower house
- Term limits: None

History
- New session started: January 21, 2025

Leadership
- Speaker: Julie Fahey (D) since March 7, 2024
- Speaker pro tempore: David Gomberg (D) since January 13, 2025
- Majority Leader: Ben Bowman (D) since March 21, 2024
- Minority Leader: Lucetta Elmer (R) since October 1, 2025

Structure
- Seats: 60
- Political groups: Majority: Democratic (37); Minority: Republican (23)
- Length of term: 2 years
- Authority: Article IV, Oregon Constitution
- Salary: $21,612/year + per diem

Elections
- Last election: November 5, 2024 (60 seats)
- Next election: November 3, 2026 (60 seats)
- Redistricting: Legislative Control

Meeting place
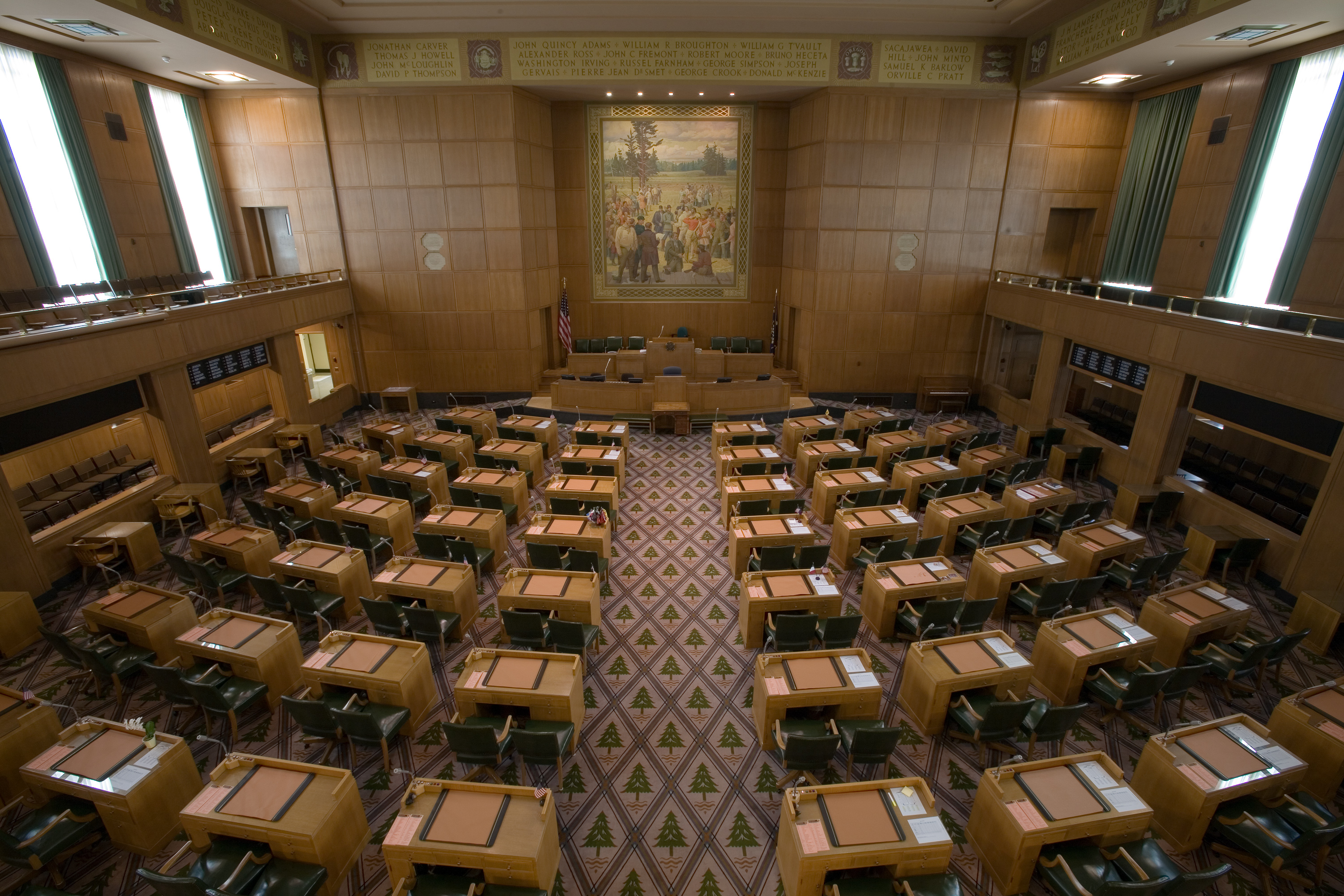
- House of Representatives Chamber; Oregon State Capitol; Salem, Oregon

Website
- Oregon House of Representatives

The Oregon House of Representatives is the lower house of the Oregon Legislative Assembly, the upper house being the Oregon State Senate. There are 60 members of the House, representing 60 districts across the state, each with a population of approximately 65,000. The House meets in the west wing of the Oregon State Capitol in Salem.

Members of the House serve two-year terms without term limits. In 2002, the Oregon Supreme Court struck down Oregon Ballot Measure 3 (1992), that had restricted State Representatives to three terms (six years) on procedural grounds.

In the current legislative session, Democrats have 37 seats, a slim 2 seat supermajority, while the Republicans have a minority of 23 seats.

== Current session ==
=== Leadership ===
82nd Oregon House Leadership
Position	Representative	District	Party	Residence
Speaker of the House	Julie Fahey	14	Democratic	Eugene
Speaker pro Tempore	David Gomberg	10	Democratic	Otis
Majority Leader	Ben Bowman	25	Democratic	Tigard
Majority Whip	Andrea Valderrama	47	Democratic	Portland
Assistant Majority Leaders	Pam Marsh	5	Democratic	Ashland
Assistant Majority Leaders	Hai Pham	36	Democratic	Hillsboro
Assistant Majority Leaders	Annessa Hartman	40	Democratic	Gladstone
Minority Leader	Lucetta Elmer	24	Republican	McMinnville
Deputy Minority Leader	Alex Skarlatos	4	Republican	Winston
Minority Whip	Virgle Osborne	2	Republican	Roseburg
Assistant Minority Leaders	Shelly Boshart Davis	15	Republican	Albany
Assistant Minority Leaders	Mark Owens	60	Republican	Crane
Assistant Minority Leaders	Emily McIntire	56	Republican	Eagle Point

=== Current members ===
District	Name	Party	Residence	Start
1	Court Boice	Republican	Gold Beach	2023 (Note: Originally appointed.)
2	Virgle Osborne	Republican	Roseburg	2023
3	Dwayne Yunker	Republican	Grants Pass	2023
4	Alek Skarlatos	Republican	Canyonville	2025
5	Pam Marsh	Democratic	Ashland	2017
6	Kim Wallan	Republican	Medford	2019
7	John Lively	Democratic	Springfield	2013
8	Lisa Fragala	Democratic	Eugene	2025
9	Boomer Wright	Republican	Reedsport	2021
10	David Gomberg	Democratic	Otis	2013
11	Jami Cate	Republican	Lebanon	2021
12	Darin Harbick	Republican	McKenzie Bridge	2025
13	Nancy Nathanson	Democratic	Eugene	2007
14	Julie Fahey	Democratic	Eugene	2017
15	Shelly Boshart Davis	Republican	Albany	2019
16	Sarah Finger McDonald	Democratic	Corvallis	2025
17	Ed Diehl	Republican	Stayton	2023
18	Rick Lewis	Republican	Silverton	2017
19	Tom Andersen	Democratic	Salem	2023
20	Paul Evans	Democratic	Monmouth	2015
21	Kevin Mannix (Note: Mannix previously served in the state house from 1989–2001.)	Republican	Salem	2023
22	Lesly Muñoz	Democratic	Woodburn	2025
23	Anna Scharf	Republican	Amity	2021
24	Lucetta Elmer	Republican	McMinnville	2023
25	Ben Bowman	Democratic	Tigard	2023
26	Sue Rieke Smith	Democratic	King City	2025
27	Ken Helm	Democratic	Beaverton	2015
28	Dacia Grayber	Democratic	Portland	2021
29	Susan McLain	Democratic	Forest Grove	2015
30	Nathan Sosa	Democratic	Hillsboro	2022
31	Darcey Edwards	Republican	Banks	2025
32	Cyrus Javadi	Democratic (Note: Javadi served as a Republican from 2023–2025 and as a Democrat from 2025–present.)	Tillamook	2023
33	Shannon Jones Isadore	Democratic	Portland	2024
34	Mari Watanabe	Democratic	Beaverton	2025
35	Farrah Chaichi	Democratic	Aloha	2023
36	Hai Pham	Democratic	Hillsboro	2023
37	Jules Walters	Democratic	West Linn	2023
38	Daniel Nguyen	Democratic	Lake Oswego	2023
39	April Dobson	Democratic	Happy Valley	2025
40	Annessa Hartman	Democratic	Gladstone	2023
41	Mark Gamba	Democratic	Milwaukie	2023
42	Rob Nosse	Democratic	Portland	2014
43	Tawna Sanchez	Democratic	Portland	2017
44	Travis Nelson	Democratic	Portland	2022
45	Thuy Tran	Democratic	Portland	2023
46	Willy Chotzen	Democratic	Portland	2025
47	Andrea Valderrama	Democratic	Portland	2021
48	Lamar Wise	Democratic	Portland	2025
49	Zach Hudson	Democratic	Troutdale	2021
50	Ricki Ruiz	Democratic	Gresham	2021
51	Matt Bunch	Republican	Beavercreek	2025
52	Jeff Helfrich (Note: Helfrich previously served in the state house from 2017–2019.)	Republican	Hood River	2023
53	Emerson Levy	Democratic	Bend	2023
54	Jason Kropf	Democratic	Bend	2021
55	E. Werner Reschke	Republican	Malin	2017
56	Emily McIntire	Republican	Eagle Point	2023
57	Greg Smith	Republican	Heppner	2001
58	Bobby Levy	Republican	Echo	2021
59	Vikki Breese-Iverson	Republican	Prineville	2019
60	Mark Owens	Republican	Crane	2020

== Composition ==
The Republican Party held the majority in the House for many years until the Democratic Party gained a majority following the 2006 elections. After losing several seats in the 2010 elections, resulting in a split control between both parties for one legislative term, Democrats regained their majority in the 2012 elections. The Oregon State Senate has been under continuous Democratic control since 2005. On June 10, 2021, Republican Mike Nearman was expelled from the house by a 59–1 vote for intentionally letting armed protesters into the Oregon State Capitol to protest against health restrictions related to the COVID-19 pandemic in Oregon. This was the first time a member of the legislature has been expelled in the state's history. The lone no vote was by Nearman himself.

Affiliation	Party (Shading indicates majority caucus)		Total	Vacant
Affiliation	Democratic	Republican	Total	Vacant
73rd (2005–2006)	27	33	60	0
74th (2007–2008)	31	29	60	0
75th (2009–2010)	36	24	60	0
76th (2011–2012)	30	30	60	0
77th (2013–2014)	34	26	60	0
78th (2015–2016)	35	25	60	0
79th (2017–2018)	35	25	60	0
80th (2019–2020)	38	22	60	0
81st (2021–2022)	37	23	60	0
82nd (2023–2024)	35	25	60	0
83rd (2025–2026)	37	23	60	0
Latest voting share	62%	38%		

== Milestones ==
- 1914: Marian B. Towne became the first woman elected to the Oregon House
- 1972: Bill McCoy became the first Black person to serve in the House
- 1985: Margaret Carter became the first Black woman elected to the House
- 1986: Rocky Barilla became the first Latino elected to the House
- 1991: Gail Shibley became the first openly gay person to serve in the House
- 2013: Jessica Vega Pederson became the first Latina woman to serve in the House
- 2013: Tina Kotek became the first openly gay person to serve as Speaker of the Oregon House of Representatives
- 2021: Mike Nearman became the first person to be expelled from the Legislature
- 2022: Janelle Bynum became the first Black person to receive votes for Speaker of the House
- 2022: Travis Nelson became the first openly gay person of color to serve in the House

== Officers ==
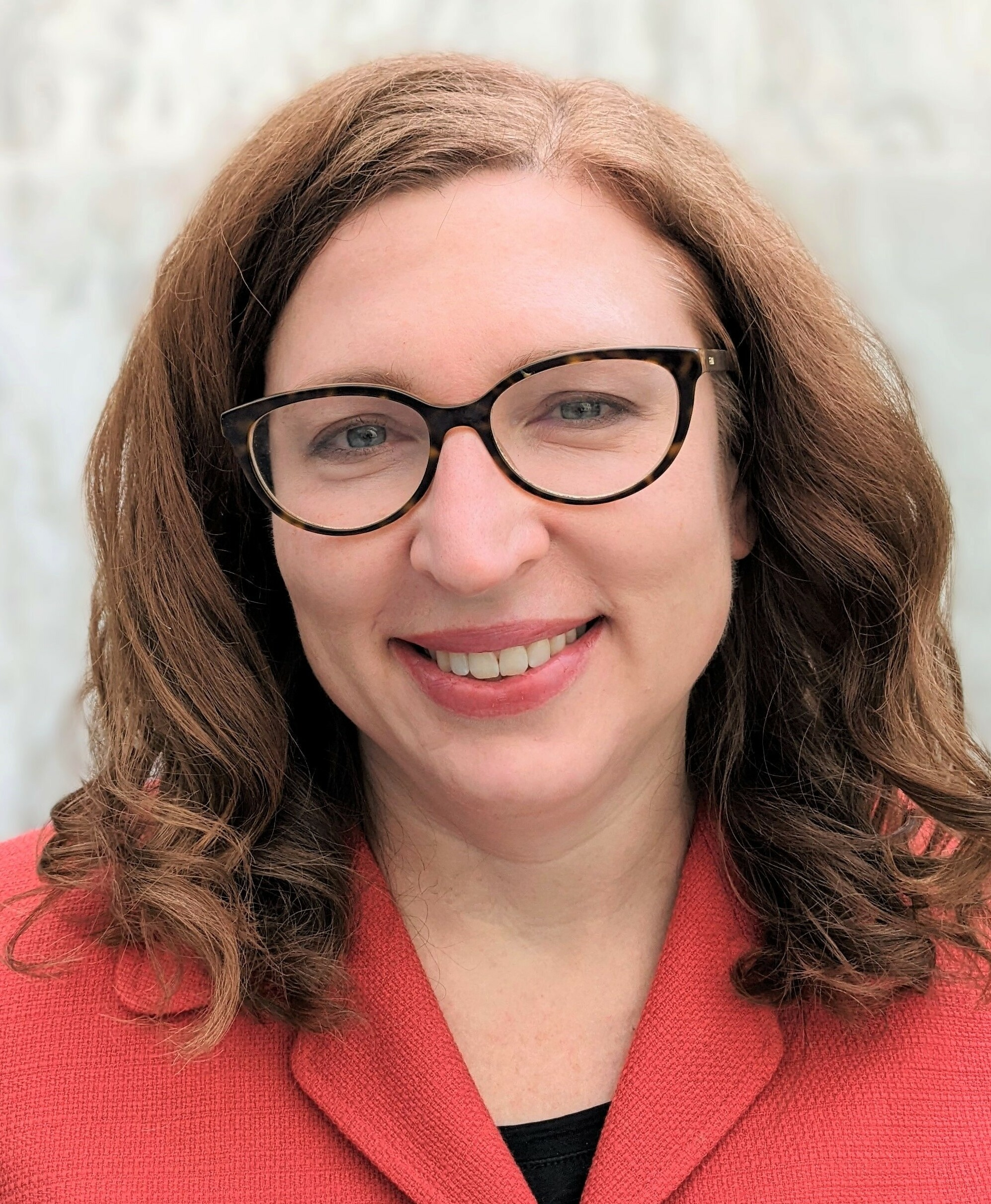
Julie Fahey (D-Eugene) is the current Speaker of the House

=== Chief Clerk ===
"The Chief Clerk of the House is the administrative officer elected for a two-year term by the membership of the House of Representatives to be responsible for ensuring that the chamber's business and proceedings run smoothly. The Chief Clerk's Office is therefore responsible for a multiplicity of duties including the processing of the official business of the House, providing the proper setting for consideration and enactment of Oregon laws, maintaining the Rules of the House of Representatives, and advising presiding officers and other members on the proper interpretation of chamber rules and protocols." "Chief Clerk". OregonLegislature.gov.

The Office of the Chief Clerk also comprises a Deputy Chief Clerk, Journal Clerk, Measure History Clerk, Reading Clerk, and a Sergeant-at-Arms.

== Party leaders ==
Current House party leaders

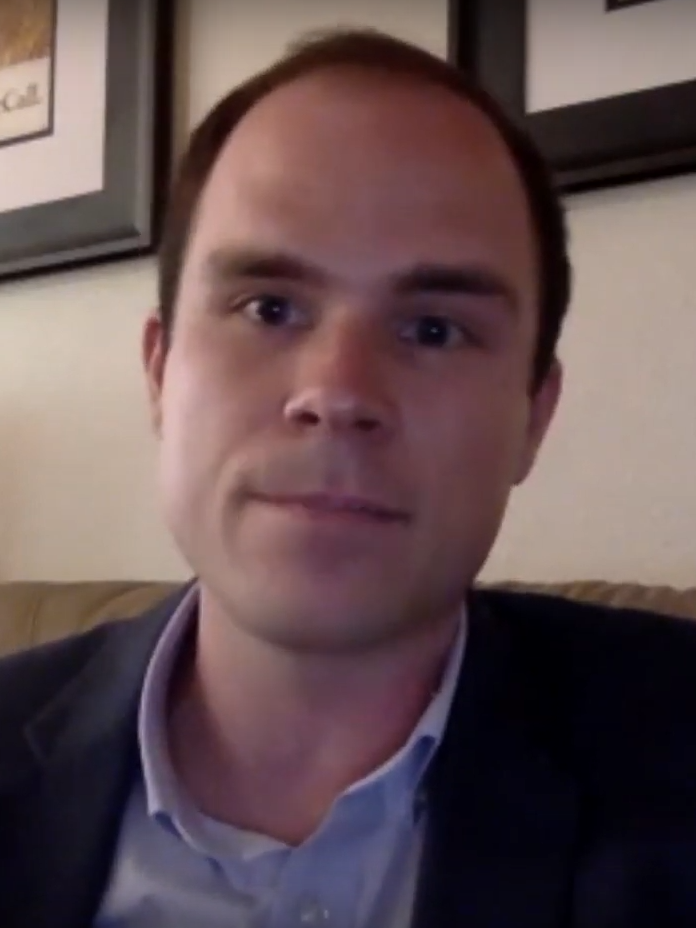
Majority Leader
Ben Bowman (D-Tigard)

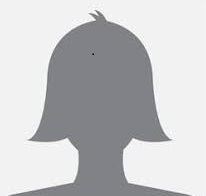
Minority Leader
Lucetta Elmer (R-McMinnville)

Session	Democratic leader	Majority party Speaker	Republican leader	Governor
1999	Kitty Piercy	Republican majority Lynn Snodgrass	Steve Harper	John Kitzhaber
1999 Sp.	Kitty Piercy	Republican majority Lynn Snodgrass	Steve Harper	John Kitzhaber
2001	Dan Gardner	Republican majority Mark Simmons	Karen Minnis	John Kitzhaber
2001 Sp.	Dan Gardner	Republican majority Mark Simmons	Karen Minnis	John Kitzhaber
2003	Deborah Kafoury	Republican majority Karen Minnis	Tim Knopp	Ted Kulongoski
2005	Jeff Merkley	Republican majority Karen Minnis	Wayne Scott	Ted Kulongoski
2007	Dave Hunt	Democratic majority Jeff Merkley	Wayne Scott	Ted Kulongoski
2007	Dave Hunt	Democratic majority Jeff Merkley	Bruce Hanna	Ted Kulongoski
2009	Mary Nolan	Democratic majority Dave Hunt	Bruce Hanna	Ted Kulongoski
2011	Dave Hunt	Split house Arnie Roblan	Kevin Cameron	John Kitzhaber
2011	Tina Kotek	Split house Bruce Hanna	Kevin Cameron	John Kitzhaber
2013	Val Hoyle	Democratic majority Tina Kotek	Mike McLane	John Kitzhaber
2015	Jennifer Williamson	Democratic majority Tina Kotek	Mike McLane	Kate Brown
2017	Jennifer Williamson	Democratic majority Tina Kotek	Mike McLane	Kate Brown
2019	Barbara Smith Warner	Democratic majority Tina Kotek	Carl Wilson	Kate Brown
2019	Barbara Smith Warner	Democratic majority Tina Kotek	Christine Drazan	Kate Brown
2021	Barbara Smith Warner	Democratic majority Tina Kotek	Vikki Breese-Iverson	Kate Brown
2022 Sp.	Julie Fahey	Democratic majority Dan Rayfield	Jeff Helfrich	Tina Kotek
2023	Julie Fahey	Democratic majority Dan Rayfield	Jeff Helfrich	Tina Kotek
2025	Ben Bowman	Democratic majority Julie Fahey	Christine Drazan	Tina Kotek
2026	Ben Bowman	Democratic majority Julie Fahey	Lucetta Elmer	Tina Kotek

== See also ==
- List of speakers of the Oregon House of Representatives
- Oregon State Capitol
- Oregon Legislative Assembly
- Oregon State Senate
- List of Oregon Legislative Assemblies
