= 2006 Oregon elections =

- November 7, 2006

Oregon's 2006 statewide election included a May 16 primary election and a November 7 general election.

Ten statewide ballot measures were on the November ballot. The following offices were up for election: Governor, Supreme Court Position 6 (to succeed Wallace P. Carson, Jr.), and numerous seats in the state legislature (House of Representatives and Senate), the state Circuit Courts, and the District Attorney's offices.

Offices that were uncontested, or local to various towns, counties, or regions, were also on Oregon ballots. Such races are not listed on this page.

According to the Annual Oregon Population Report for 2005, the total estimated population of Oregon as of July 1, 2005 was 3,631,440, of which 2,765,827 were of voting age. Of these, 69,146 were ineligible to vote due to legal impediments, leaving an estimated 2,696,681 Oregonians eligible to vote. 1,976,669 voters were in fact registered for the 2006 election, 73.3% of those estimated eligible, and 70.8% of these registered voters or 1,399,650 voters actually did cast their ballots.

== Election process ==
Both partisan and non-partisan offices were at stake in the 2006 election cycle. Oregon conducts partisan and non-partisan elections differently:

For partisan offices (such as the state legislature and governor's races), major parties (Democratic and Republican) run candidates in the Primary to select their nominee for the General Election. (The state takes on the administrative and financial burden of primaries for the two major parties, while other parties determine their candidate according to whatever nominating process they choose.) A plurality (that is, more votes than any opponent) is sufficient for a major party candidate to win nomination; candidates need not get more than 50% of the vote to advance to the General Election.

Non-partisan offices (such as judges, district attorneys, and superintendent) may be filled in the Primary, if any candidate wins a majority of the vote. If no candidate wins over 50% of the vote, however, the top two vote-winners will face each other in a runoff in the November General Election.

County governments conduct the elections. Immediately after an election, their web sites are the best place to find accurate election results. The Secretary of State's office posts official results 30 days after an election.

=== Key: abbreviations of Oregon political parties ===
- (I) Independent Party of Oregon
- (C) Constitution Party of Oregon
- (D) Democratic Party of Oregon
- (G) Pacific Green Party of Oregon
- (L) Libertarian Party of Oregon
- (R) Republican Party of Oregon
- (N) non-affiliated (no party affiliation)

== U.S. House of Representatives ==
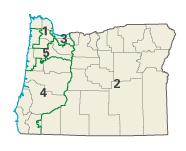

All five of Oregon's federal congressional districts in the U.S. House of Representatives were up for election in 2006. All incumbents (four Democrats, one Republican) won re-election.

== State Legislature ==
In the bicameral Oregon Legislative Assembly, each of the 30 Senate districts is composed of exactly two House districts. Detailed district boundaries may be found at the Secretary of State's website.

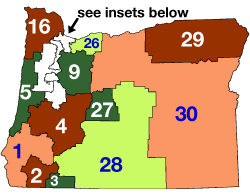
State Senate districts

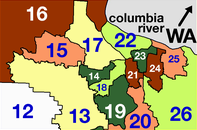
Portland Senate districts

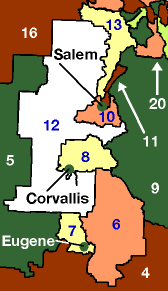
Willamette valley Senate districts

=== Oregon House of Representatives ===
Oregon's state house in its entirety comes up for election in even-numbered years. All 60 biennially elected seats in the House were up for election. Each seat has a 2-year term with no term limits. The Democrats won in 31 of 60 districts, gaining four seats and control of Oregon's state house for the first time since 1990.

**House party balance**	2004	**2006**	+/-
Democrat-held	27	31	+4
Republican-held	33	29	-4
**Total**	**60**		

=== Oregon Senate ===
**Senate party balance**	2004	**2006**	+/-
Democrat-held	18	18	net 0
Republican-held	12	11	-1
Independent-held	0	1	+1
**Total**	**30**		

Oregon State Senators serve four-year terms without term limits. Their terms are staggered so that only half of the Senators are up for re-election every two even-numbered years.

The Republicans lost one seat in the state senate, because Senator Westlund, although not up for election, switched first to non-partisan Independent to challenge for the governor's seat, then withdrew from that race and re-registered as a Democrat, gaining the Democrats one seat. The Democrats, however, also lost Senator Gordly, who was not up for election either, but she re-registered as a non-partisan Independent. Outside the party changes by these two individual Senators, no other seats in the Senate shifted party as a result of the election, although three incumbents declined to run for various reasons, and another lost his primary. Democrats maintained their majority.

Most races were not strongly contested in the general election. In 60% of the legislative races, the "underdog" candidate raised less than 25% of the funds his or her opponent raised. Also, in 85% of the 75 legislative races, the winner was the candidate who raised more money.

Candidates for the Oregon Senate and House are listed in the chart below. House districts are listed next to the Senate district to which they belong (rather than listing the Senate and House in separate charts.) The counties covered by each Senate district are listed in italics, with (parentheses) if the county extends into other districts. Box colors indicate party affiliation for both incumbents and general election winners (light blue for Democrats, light red for Republicans). Names and statistics of general election winners are also boldfaced. For primary candidates, see Oregon primary election, 2006.

=== Overall Results ===
Senate District, incumbent, county(s)	House District, incumbent	Notes	Candidates	Votes Garnered	Margin
1 Jeff Kruse (R) Curry (Coos) (Douglas)	This senate seat not up for election in 2006				
1 Jeff Kruse (R) Curry (Coos) (Douglas)	1 Wayne Krieger (R)		**Wayne Krieger** (R); Robert Taylor (L); Write-ins	**16,736**; 5,861; 182	**73.47%** 25.73%.80%
1 Jeff Kruse (R) Curry (Coos) (Douglas)	2 Susan Morgan (R)	Morgan ran unopposed	**Susan Morgan** (R); Write-ins	**16,962**; 453	**97.40%** 2.60%
2 Jason Atkinson (R) Josephine	This senate seat not up for election in 2006				
2 Jason Atkinson (R) Josephine	3 Gordon Anderson (R)	Anderson announced resignation after Primary filing deadline	**Ron Maurer** (R); Howard Owens (D); Write-ins	**14,394**; 8,645; 47	**62.35%** 37.45%.20%
2 Jason Atkinson (R) Josephine	4 Dennis Richardson (R)		**Dennis Richardson** (R); Richard Koopmans (D); Write-ins	**16,604**; 7,214; 71	**69.50%** 30.20%.30%
3 Alan C. Bates (D) Jackson			**Alan C. Bates** (D); Lynn Aiello (R); Write-ins	**30,552**; 17,321; 92	**63.7%** 36.11%.19%
3 Alan C. Bates (D) Jackson	5 Peter Buckley (D)	Buckley ran unopposed	**Peter Buckley** (D); Write-ins	**19,310**; 496	**97.50%** 2.50%
3 Alan C. Bates (D) Jackson	6 Sal Esquivel (R)		**Sal Esquivel**(R); Mike Moran (D); Write-ins	**11,423**; 10,541; 43	**51.91%** 47.90%.20%
4 Floyd Prozanski (D) (Douglas) (Lane)			**Floyd Prozanski** (D); Bill Eddie (R); Write-ins	**30,402**; 17,327; 96	**63.57%** 36.23%.20%
4 Floyd Prozanski (D) (Douglas) (Lane)	7 Bruce Hanna (R)	Laura Aviani-Skinner (I) filed but did not qualify, for the third time.	**Bruce Hanna** (R); Write-ins	**15,505**; 664	**95.89%** 4.11%
4 Floyd Prozanski (D) (Douglas) (Lane)	8 Paul Holvey (D)		**Paul R. Holvey** (D); Andrew Hill (R); Write-ins	**18,481**; 5,460; 63	**76.99%** 22.75%.26%
5 Joanne Verger (D) Lincoln (Lane) (Douglas) (Coos) (Yamhill) (Tillamook)	This senate seat not up for election in 2006				
5 Joanne Verger (D) Lincoln (Lane) (Douglas) (Coos) (Yamhill) (Tillamook)	9 Arnie Roblan (D)		**Arnie Roblan** (D); Al Pearn (R); Write-ins	**13,340**; 9,793; 32	**57.59%** 42.27%.14%
5 Joanne Verger (D) Lincoln (Lane) (Douglas) (Coos) (Yamhill) (Tillamook)	10 Alan Brown (R)		**Jean Cowan** (D); Alan Brown (R); Write-ins	**12,904**; 12,112; 68	**51.44%** 48.29% 0.14%
6 Bill Morrisette (D) (Lane) (Linn)			**Bill Morrisette** (D); Renee Lindsey (R); Write-ins	**14,753**; 30,161; 99	**32.77%** 67.01% 0.22%
6 Bill Morrisette (D) (Lane) (Linn)	11 Phil Barnhart (D)		**Phil Barnhart** (D); J. Oakley (R); Write-ins	**16,206**; 10,009; 57	**61.69%** 38.10% 0.22%
6 Bill Morrisette (D) (Lane) (Linn)	12 Elizabeth Terry Beyer (D)		**Terry Beyer** (D); Bill Lioio (R); Write-ins	**11,015**; 6,093; 36	**64.25%** 35.54% 0.21%
7 Vicki Walker (D) (Lane)			**Vicki Walker** (D); Jim Torrey (R); Write-ins	**25,667**; 23,962; 134	**51.58%** 48.15% 0.27%
7 Vicki Walker (D) (Lane)	13 Robert Ackerman (D)	Thomas Ray Albright, Republican nominee, withdrew August 1; replaced by Monica Johnson, loser of Republican primary to challenge for Oregon's 4th District U.S. House. That challenge was also lost.	**Nancy Nathanson** (D); Monica Johnson (R); Write-ins	**17,505**; 6,622; 73	**72.33%** 27.36% 0.30%
7 Vicki Walker (D) (Lane)	14 Debi Farr (R)		**Chris Edwards** (D); Debi Farr (R); Write-ins	**12,320**; 11,257; 56	**52.13%** 47.63% 0.24%
8 Frank Morse (R) (Benton) (Linn)			**Frank Morse** (R); Mario E. Magana; Write-ins	**27,127**; 18,767; 134	**58.94%** 40.77% 0.29%
8 Frank Morse (R) (Benton) (Linn)	15 Andy Olson (R)		**Andy Olson** (R); Sam H.W Sappington (D); Write-ins	**16,317**; 7,634; 47	**67.99%** 31.81% 0.20%
8 Frank Morse (R) (Benton) (Linn)	16 Sara Gelser (D)		**Sara Gelser** (D); Robin M. Brown (R); Write-ins	**15,058**; 7,252; 40	**67.37%** 32.45% 0.18%
9 Roger Beyer (R) (Clackamas) (Linn)	This senate seat not up for election in 2006				
9 Roger Beyer (R) (Clackamas) (Linn)	17 Jeff Kropf (R)	Kropf dropped out of the race in July. Girod was chosen 8/13 as the new nominee.	**Fred Girod** (R); Dan Thackaberry (D); Write-ins	**12,658**; 8,682; 91	**59.06%** 40.51% 0.42%
9 Roger Beyer (R) (Clackamas) (Linn)	18 Mac Sumner (R)	Sumner announced his resignation shortly after winning the election.	**Mac Sumner** (R); Jim Gilbert (D); Roger Shipman (C); Write-ins	**11,526**; 9,840; 504; 34	**52.62%** 44.92% 2.30% 0.16%
10 Jackie Winters (R) (Marion)			**Jackie Winters** (R); Paul Evans (D); Write-ins	**24,641**; 21,232; 99	**53.60%** 46.18% 0.22%
10 Jackie Winters (R) (Marion)	19 Kevin Cameron (R)	Jerry DeFoe was chosen 6/3 as the Libertarian nominee, filed 6/5, then withdrew 6/23 and instead challenged for Oregon's 5th District U.S. House seat and lost.	**Kevin Cameron** (R); Brian Grisham (D); Write-ins	**12,506**; 9,529; 54	**56.62%** 43.14% 0.24%
10 Jackie Winters (R) (Marion)	20 Vicki Berger (R)		**Vicki Berger** (R); Connie Garcia (D); Write-ins	**13,382**; 9,040; 79	**59.47%** 40.18% 0.35%
Senate District, incumbent, county(s)	House District, incumbent	Notes	Candidates	Votes Garnered	Margin
11 Peter Courtney (D) (Marion)			**Peter Courtney**(D); Jared Thatcher (R); Keith Humphrey (C); Write-ins	**15,593**; 10,814; 767; 49	**57.28%** 39.72% 2.82% 0.18%
11 Peter Courtney (D) (Marion)	21 Billy Dalto (R)		**Brian Clem** (D); Billy Dalto (R); Write-ins	**9,598**; 6,025; 101	**61.04%** 38.32% 0.64%
11 Peter Courtney (D) (Marion)	22 Betty Komp (D)		**Betty Komp** (D); Carl Wieneke (R); Michael Marsh (C); Write-ins	**5,830**; 5,090; 381; 22	**51.49%** 44.95% 3.36% 0.19%
12 Gary George (R) (Polk) (Yamhill)	This senate seat not up for election in 2006				
12 Gary George (R) (Polk) (Yamhill)	23 Brian Boquist (R)		**Brian Boquist** (R); Jason Brown (D); Paul Delaney (L); Write-ins	**13,422**; 8,760; 942; 27	**57.98%** 37.84% 4.07% 0.12%
12 Gary George (R) (Polk) (Yamhill)	24 Donna G. Nelson (R)	Statesman Journal Endorses Peralta, News Register Endorses Peralta	**Donna G. Nelson** (R); Sal Peralta (D); David Terry (L); Write-ins	**11,206**; 10,847; 85; 160	**48.58%** 47.03% 3.69% 0.69%
13 Charles Starr (R) (Washington) (Yamhill) (Polk)		Incumbent Senator Starr lost his party's primary to Larry George.	**Larry George** (R); Rick Ross (D); Write-ins	**26,504**; 18,318; 117	**58.98%** 40.76% 0.26%
13 Charles Starr (R) (Washington) (Yamhill) (Polk)	25 Kim Thatcher (R)		**Kim Thatcher** (R); Charles E. Lee (D); Write-ins	**11,956**; 8,977; 38	**57.01%** 42.81% 0.18%
13 Charles Starr (R) (Washington) (Yamhill) (Polk)	26 Jerry Krummel (R)		**Jerry Krummel** (R); Lee Coleman (D); Charles F. Radley (L); Write-ins	**14,424**; 9,313; 617; 33	**59.15%** 38.19% 2.53% 0.14%
14 Ryan Deckert (D) (Washington)	This senate seat not up for election in 2006				
14 Ryan Deckert (D) (Washington)	27 Mark Hass (D)	Incumbent Representative Hass declined to run for a fourth term.	**Tobias Read** (D); Dominic Biggi (R); Write-ins	**14,325**; 9,706; 43	**59.50%** 40.32% 0.18%
14 Ryan Deckert (D) (Washington)	28 Jeff Barker (D)		**Jeff Barker** (D); Eldon Derville-Teer (R); Write-ins	**10,924**; 5,912; 86	**64.56%** 34.94% 0.51%
15 Bruce Starr (R) (Washington)		Oregonian profile of Napolitano	**Bruce Starr** (R); John Napolitano (D); Write-ins	**19,973**; 16,308; 71	**54.94%** 44.86% 0.20%
15 Bruce Starr (R) (Washington)	29 Chuck Riley (D)		**Chuck Riley** (D); Terry Rilling (R); Scott Harwood (L); Write-ins	**7,987**; 6,659; 769; 34	**51.70%** 43.10% 4.98% 0.22%
15 Bruce Starr (R) (Washington)	30 Derrick Kitts (R)	Kitts challenged incumbent David Wu for Oregon's 1st US Congress District and lost.	**David Edwards** (D); Everett Curry (R); Ken Cunningham (C); Write-ins	**12,253**; 8,965; 442; 38	**56.47%** 41.32% 2.04% 0.18%
16 Betsy Johnson (politician) (D) Clatsop Columbia (Tillamook) (Washington)			**Betsy Johnson (politician)** (D); Don Fell (R); Robert J. Simmering (C); Write-ins	**30,645**; 16,040; 1,429; 85	**63.58%** 33.28% 2.96% 0.18%
16 Betsy Johnson (politician) (D) Clatsop Columbia (Tillamook) (Washington)	31 Brad Witt (D)		**Brad Witt** (D); Mike Kocher (R); Bob Ekström (C); Write-ins	**13,975**; 6,955; 2,802; 62	**58.73%** 29.23% 11.78% 0.26%
16 Betsy Johnson (politician) (D) Clatsop Columbia (Tillamook) (Washington)	32 Deborah Boone (D)		**Deborah Boone** (D); Norm Myers (R); Write-ins	**14,876**; 9,112; 61	**61.86%** 37.89% 0.25%
17 Charlie Ringo (D) (Multnomah)		Incumbent Senator Ringo declined to run January 12, 2006	**Brad Avakian** (D); Piotr Kuklinski (R); Richard Whitehead (L); John R. Pivarnik (C); Write-ins	**31,612**; 13,497; 1,445; 371; 89	**67.24%** 28.71% 3.07% 0.79% 0.19%
17 Charlie Ringo (D) (Multnomah)	33 Mitch Greenlick (D)		**Mitch Greenlick** (D); Mark Eggleston (R); David E. Long (L); Write-ins	**19,481**; 7,378; 1,080; 62	**69.57%** 26.35% 3.86% 0.22%
17 Charlie Ringo (D) (Multnomah)	34 Brad Avakian (D)	Incumbent Representative Avakian ran in Oregon's 17th Senate district race and won, after Incumbent Senator Ringo declined to run.	**Suzanne Bonamici** (D); Joan Draper (R); Gregory F. Rohde (L); Write-ins	11,780'; 6,902; 439; 27	**61.52%** 36.05% 2.29% 0.14%
18 Ginny Burdick (D) (Multnomah) (Washington)	This senate seat not up for election in 2006				
18 Ginny Burdick (D) (Multnomah) (Washington)	35 Larry Galizio (D)		**Larry Galizio** (D); Shirley Parsons (R); Write-ins	**12,628**; 10,000; 47	**55.69%** 44.10% 0.21%
18 Ginny Burdick (D) (Multnomah) (Washington)	36 Mary Nolan (D)		**Mary Nolan** (D); Frank Dane (L); Write-ins	**20,344**; 3,520; 137	**84.76%** 14.67% 0.57%
19 Richard Devlin (D) (Clackamas)		Independent candidate Christie M. Schaefer was listed at one point but failed to qualify enough signatures.	**Richard Devlin** (D); David Newell (R); Marc Delphine (L) Write-ins	**30,963**; 18,299; 1,218; 65	**61.26%** 36.20% 2.41% 0.13%
19 Richard Devlin (D) (Clackamas)	37 Scott Bruun (R)	Oregonian article about two of the candidates	**Scott Bruun** (R); Bev Backa (D); David M. Akin (L); Write-ins	**12,531**; 10,461; 507; 20	**53.28%** 44.48% 2.16% 0.09%
19 Richard Devlin (D) (Clackamas)	38 Greg Macpherson (D)		**Greg Macpherson** (D); Fred Bremner (R); Write-ins	**18,361**; 8,335; 45	**68.66%** 31.17% 0.17%
20 Kurt Schrader (D) (Clackamas)		Schrader ran unopposed. Thomas F. Lemons (R) won his Republican primary for the district, but withdrew July 20.	**Kurt Schrader** (D); Write-ins	**28,530**; 1,154	**96.11%** 3.89%
20 Kurt Schrader (D) (Clackamas)	39 Wayne Scott (R)		**Wayne Scott** (R); Mike Caudle (D); Wes Wagner (L); Write-ins	**12,247**; 9,214; 819; 51	**54.84%** 41.26% 3.67% 0.23%
20 Kurt Schrader (D) (Clackamas)	40 Dave Hunt (D)	Hunt ran unopposed.	**Dave Hunt** (D); Write-ins	**13,606**; 418	**97.02%** 2.98%
Senate District, incumbent, county(s)	House District, incumbent	Notes	Candidates	Votes Garnered	Margin
21 Kate Brown (D) (Multnomah)	This senate seat not up for election in 2006				
21 Kate Brown (D) (Multnomah)	41 Carolyn Tomei (D)	Incumbent Representative Tomei ran unopposed.	**Carolyn Tomei** (D); Write-ins	**15,998**; 510	**96.91%** 3.09%
21 Kate Brown (D) (Multnomah)	42 Diane Rosenbaum (D)		**Diane Rosenbaum** (D); Jeff Cropp (G); Write-ins	**20,325**; 3,870; 155	**83.47%** 15.89% 0.64%
22 Margaret Carter (D) (Multnomah)	This senate seat not up for election in 2006				
22 Margaret Carter (D) (Multnomah)	43 Chip Shields	Incumbent Representative Shields ran unopposed.	**Chip Shields** (D); Write-ins	**18,340**; 378	**97.98%** 2.02%
22 Margaret Carter (D) (Multnomah)	44 Gary Hansen (D)	Incumbent Representative Hansen ran for Multnomah County Commissioner in District 2, and won.	**Tina Kotek** (D); Jay Kushner (R); Write-ins	**13,931**; 3,645; 97	**78.83%** 20.62% 0.55%
23 Avel Gordly (I) (Multnomah)	This senate seat not up for election in 2006. Senator Gordly dropped her Democratic Party affiliation to register as a non-partisan Independent in June 2006.				
23 Avel Gordly (I) (Multnomah)	45 Jackie Dingfelder (D)		**Jackie Dingfelder** (D); Dick Osborne (R); Write-ins	**18,460**; 4,603; 73	**79.79%** 19.90% 0.32%
23 Avel Gordly (I) (Multnomah)	46 Steve March (D)	Incumbent Representative March ran for Multnomah County Auditor, and lost.	**Ben Cannon** (D); William Cornett (R); Paul Loney (G); Write-ins	**16,348**; 3,493; 1,318; 75	**76.99%** 16.45% 6.21% 0.35%
24 Frank Shields (D) (Multnomah)		Incumbent Senator Shields withdrew from the race 3/9/2006.	**Rod Monroe** (D); T.J. Reilly (R); Ron McCarty (I); Write-ins	**17,304**; 15,483; 2,653; 85	**48.71%** 43.58% 7.47% 0.24%
24 Frank Shields (D) (Multnomah)	47 Jeff Merkley (D)		**Jeff Merkley** (D); Bruce McCain (R); Write-ins	**11,106**; 6,192; 65	**63.96%** 35.66% 0.37%
24 Frank Shields (D) (Multnomah)	48 Mike Schaufler (D)	Republican nominee Dave Mowry withdrew on July 21.	**Mike Schaufler** (D); N. W. (Bill) Stallings (C); Write-ins	**11,262**; 3,672; 232	**74.26%** 24.21% 1.53%
25 Laurie Monnes Anderson (Multnomah) (D)	This senate seat not up for election in 2006				
25 Laurie Monnes Anderson (Multnomah) (D)	49 Karen Minnis (R)	Brad Fudge (L) filed for the ballot, but was disqualified on Sept. 1.	**Karen Minnis** (R); Rob Brading (D); Write-ins	**8,601**; 7,911; 92	**51.80%** 47.65% 0.55%
25 Laurie Monnes Anderson (Multnomah) (D)	50 John Lim (R)	Statesman-Journal story about ethics investigation into Lim's travel	**John Lim** (R); Jill Selman-Ringer (D); Brian D. Lowery (L); Write-ins	**11,362**; 6,107; 557; 48	**62.86%** 33.79% 3.08% 0.27%
26 Rick Metsger (D) (Multnomah) (Clackamas) Hood River			**Rick Metsger** (D); Carol York (R); Write-ins	**25,183**; 18,964; 81	**56.94%** 42.88% 0.18%
26 Rick Metsger (D) (Multnomah) (Clackamas) Hood River	51 Linda Flores (R)		**Linda Flores** (R); Ryan Olds (D); Write-ins	**11,926**; 8,755; 30	**57.58%** 42.27% 0.14%
26 Rick Metsger (D) (Multnomah) (Clackamas) Hood River	52 Patti Smith (R)		**Patti Smith** (R); Suzanne VanOrman (D); Write-ins	**12,588**; 9,994; 34	**55.66%** 44.19% 0.15%
27 Ben Westlund (D) (Deschutes)	This senate seat not up for election in 2006. Westlund dropped (R) party affil to run for governor as an indep. Withdrew from gov. race 8/10/06.				
27 Ben Westlund (D) (Deschutes)	53 Gene Whisnant (R)		**Gene Whisnant** (R); Bill A. Smith (D); Write-ins	**16,527**; 11,406; 31	**59.10%** 40.79% 0.11%
27 Ben Westlund (D) (Deschutes)	54 Chuck Burley (R)		**Chuck Burley** (R); Phil Philiben (D); Write-ins	**14,780**; 11,873; 67	**55.31%** 44.43% 0.25%
28 Doug Whitsett (R) Lake Crook Klamath (Deschutes) (Jackson)	This senate seat not up for election in 2006				
28 Doug Whitsett (R) Lake Crook Klamath (Deschutes) (Jackson)	55 George Gilman (R)	Incumbent Representative Gilman ran unopposed.	**George Gilman** (R); Write-ins	**16,491**; 417	**97.53%** 2.47%
28 Doug Whitsett (R) Lake Crook Klamath (Deschutes) (Jackson)	56 Bill Garrard (R)		**Bill Garrard** (R); James Calvert (D); Write-ins	**13,759**; 6,855; 46	**66.60%** 33.18% 0.22%
29 David Nelson (R) Morrow Umatilla Union Wallowa	This senate seat not up for election in 2006				
29 David Nelson (R) Morrow Umatilla Union Wallowa	57 Greg Smith (R)	Nancy Wolfe won the Democratic party primary, but withdrew. St. Germain was nominated to take her place 8/7/06.	**Greg Smith** (R); Tonia St. Germain (D); Write-ins	**14,119**; 6,058; 45	**69.82%** 29.96% 0.22%
29 David Nelson (R) Morrow Umatilla Union Wallowa	58 Bob Jenson (R)		**Bob Jenson** (R); Ben Talley (D); Write-ins	**10,194**; 4,629; 31	**68.63%** 31.16% 0.21%
30 Ted Ferrioli (R) Wasco Sherman Gilliam Jefferson Wheeler (Deschutes) Grant Baker Harney Malheur	This senate seat not up for election in 2006				
30 Ted Ferrioli (R) Wasco Sherman Gilliam Jefferson Wheeler (Deschutes) Grant Baker Harney Malheur	59 John H. Dallum (R)		**John H. Dallum** (R); Jim Gilbertson (D); Write-ins	**10,733**; 10,453; 32	**50.58%** 49.26% 0.15%
30 Ted Ferrioli (R) Wasco Sherman Gilliam Jefferson Wheeler (Deschutes) Grant Baker Harney Malheur	60 R. Tom Butler (R)		**R. Tom Butler** (R); Peter Hall (D); Write-ins	**13,362**; 4,575; 46	**74.30%** 25.44% 0.26%
Senate District, incumbent, county(s)	House District, incumbent	Notes	Candidates	Votes Garnered	Margin

== Executive offices ==
Oregon Blue Book, list of elected executive officials

=== Governor ===
Incumbent Governor Ted Kulongoski (D) won re-election.

=== Labor Commissioner ===
Dan Gardner was unopposed in the primary and then won re-election in the general.

=== Superintendent of Schools ===
Susan Castillo won re-election.

== Judicial elections ==
Many judicial positions are not contested. Incumbents are rarely opposed, and when they resign, it is often timed such that the Governor chooses their replacement.

If a judicial position becomes vacant and the governor declines to make an appointment, it must be filled at the next general election. If it is not too late to file for a primary election, candidates will appear on that ballot in the first round of a runoff election. If there is no primary before the next general election, all candidates appear on the general election ballot, and a plurality vote may determine the winner.

=== Oregon Supreme Court ===
Position 2

Incumbent Judge Paul De Muniz sought reelection and was the only candidate to file. He won easily in the primary election against only write-in candidate opposition.

Oregon Supreme Court - Primary election (May 16, 2006)
Party	Candidate	Votes	%
Nonpartisan	Paul De Muniz	420,214	98.94
Nonpartisan	Other	4,505	1.06
Total votes		424,719	100.00

Position 3

Incumbent Judge Robert D. (Skip) Durham sought reelection and was the only candidate to file. He won easily in the primary election against only write-in candidate opposition.

Oregon Supreme Court - Primary election (May 16, 2006)
Party	Candidate	Votes	%
Nonpartisan	Robert D. (Skip) Durham	412,901	98.98
Nonpartisan	Other	4,239	1.02
Total votes		417,140	100.00

Position 6

2006 Oregon Supreme Court Position 6 election
Candidate	Virginia Linder	Jack Roberts	W. Eugene (Gene) Hallman
Party	Nonpartisan	Nonpartisan	Nonpartisan
First round	230,970; 38.6%	250,083; 41.6%	117,767; 19.6%
Runoff	577,484; 51.8%	533,661; 47.8%	Eliminated
- Linder: 40–50% 50–60% 60–70% Roberts: 30–40% 40–50% 50–60% 60–70% Hallman: 40–50%
Oregon Supreme Court Justice before election
Wallace P. Carson, Jr.
Nonpartisan
Elected Oregon Supreme Court Justice
Virginia Linder
Nonpartisan

Incumbent Judge Wallace P. Carson, Jr. of Oregon Supreme Court, Position 6, decided to retire after 34 years on the bench. Three candidates entered the race to succeed him:

- Virginia Linder, who had since 1997 been an Oregon Court of Appeals judge (winner)
- Jack Roberts, former Oregon Commissioner of Labor and Industries
- W. Eugene (Gene) Hallman, Pendleton attorney

No candidate received a majority in the primary election, and Linder and Roberts advanced to the general election. Linder won by 51.75 percent of the vote.

Oregon Supreme Court - Primary election (May 16, 2006)
Party	Candidate	Votes	%
Nonpartisan	Jack Roberts	250,083	41.64
Nonpartisan	Virginia L. Linder	230,970	38.56
Nonpartisan	W. Eugene (Gene) Hallman	117,767	19.60
Nonpartisan	Other	1,770	0.2
Total votes		600,590	100.00

Oregon Supreme Court - Runoff election (November 7, 2006)
Party	Candidate	Votes	%
Nonpartisan	Virginia L. Linder	577,484	51.75
Nonpartisan	Jack Roberts	533,661	47.82
Nonpartisan	Other	4,683	0.43
Total votes		1,115,828	100.00

=== Oregon Court of Appeals ===
Judge of the Oregon Court of Appeals, Position 5 (May 16, 2006)
Party	Candidate	Votes	%
Nonpartisan	Rick Haselton	413,243	99.10
Nonpartisan	Other	3,739	0.90
Total votes		416,982	100.00

Judge of the Oregon Court of Appeals, Position 6 (May 16, 2006)
Party	Candidate	Votes	%
Nonpartisan	David V. Brewer	411,185	99.02
Nonpartisan	Other	4,067	0.98
Total votes		415,252	100.00

Judge of the Oregon Court of Appeals, Position 8 (May 16, 2006)
Party	Candidate	Votes	%
Nonpartisan	Jack L. Landau	409,603	99.09
Nonpartisan	Other	3,748	0.91
Total votes		413,351	100.00

Judge of the Oregon Court of Appeals, Position 9 (November 7, 2006)
Party	Candidate	Votes	%
Nonpartisan	Ellen F. Rosenblum	802,565	98.33
Nonpartisan	Other	13,606	1.67
Total votes		816,171	100.00

Judge of the Oregon Court of Appeals, Position 10 (May 16, 2006)
Party	Candidate	Votes	%
Nonpartisan	Rex Armstrong	398,280	99.04
Nonpartisan	Other	3,854	0.96
Total votes		402,134	100.00

=== Circuit Court ===
Judge of the Circuit Court, 1st District, Position 5 (Jackson County)

- Raymond B. White - 21,070
- Other - 240

Judge of the Circuit Court, 1st District, Position 9 (Jackson County)

Primary:

- Ron Grensky - 15,197
- Lisa C. Greif - 11,651
- Joe Charter - 4,762
- Paul L. Henderson III - 1,602
- Other - 49

Runoff:

- Ron Grensky - 39,954
- Lisa C. Greif - 29,291
- Other - 130

Judge of the Circuit Court, 2nd District, Position 1 (Lane County)

- Karsten H. Rasmussen - 39,897
- Other - 307

Judge of the Circuit Court, 2nd District, Position 3 (Lane County)

- Lyle C. Velure - 38,112
- Other - 594

Judge of the Circuit Court, 2nd District, Position 9 (Lane County)

- Gregory G. Foote - 40,765
- Other - 367

Judge of the Circuit Court, 2nd District, Position 14 (Lane County)

- Debra Vogt - 64,209
- Alan Leiman - 49,156
- Other - 470

Judge of the Circuit Court, 4th District, Position 4 (Multnomah County)

- Adrienne C. Nelson - 134,269
- Other - 3,464

Judge of the Circuit Court, 4th District, Position 28 (Multnomah County)

- Judith Hudson Matarazzo - 39,782
- Mary Overgaard - 38,323
- James J. McIntyre - 31,408
- Mark K. Kramer - 25,046
- Ulanda L. Watkins - 18,368
- Christopher D. Wright - 11,641
- Charles L. Best - 8,961
- Theodore E. Sims - 7,652
- James E. Leuenberger - 2,506
- Other - 1,580

Judge of the Circuit Court, 4th District, Position 31 (Multnomah County)

- Cheryl Albrecht - 93,528
- Kathleen Payne - 78,778
- Other - 1,836

Judge of the Circuit Court, 4th District, Position 37 (Multnomah County)

- Leslie Roberts - 116,321
- Other - 34,227

Judge of the Circuit Court, 6th District, Position 5 (Morrow and Umatilla counties)

- Christopher R. Brauer - 11,003
- Annetta L. Spicer - 8,631
- Other - 45

Judge of the Circuit Court, 14th District, Position 2 (Josephine County)

- Pat Wolke - 19,204
- Other - 367

Judge of the Circuit Court, 15th District, Position 3 (Coos and Cutty counties)

- Jesse Margolis - 7,569
- Other - 7,449

Judge of the Circuit Court, 16th District, Position 5 (Douglas County)

- George Ambrosini - 20,741
- William (Bill) Marshal - 11,810
- Nancy Cook - 5,620
- Other - 52

Judge of the Circuit Court, 18th District, Position 3 (Clatsop County)

- Cindee S. Matyahs - 7,392
- Don H. Haller, III - 5,829
- Other - 23

Judge of the Circuit Court, 20th District, Position 6 (Washington County)

- Charlie Bailey - 71,811
- Vincent A. Deguc - 41,813
- Other - 578

=== District Attorneys ===
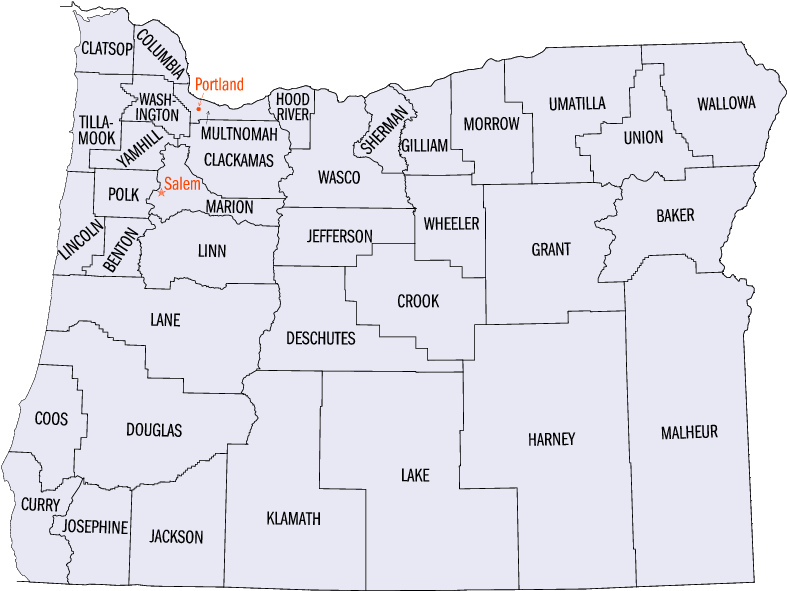

County	Candidate
Benton	Scott A. Heiser
Clatsop	Joshua Marquis
Columbia	Stephen Atchison
Deschutes	Mike Dugan
Douglas	Jack L. Banta
Gilliam	Michelle T. Timko; Marion Weatherford; Earl R. Woods, Jr.
Grant	Jim Carpenter; Ryan S. Joslin
Klamath	Edwin I. Caleb; Ginger Lee Harris
Marion	Walter M Beglau
Morrow	John L. Ballard; Valerie B. Doherty; Elizabeth Ballard (Winner In Primary)
Sherman	Tara R. Lawrence; Wade M. Mcleod
Tillamook	William (Bill) Porter
Wallowa	Daniel Ousley; Mona K. Williams
Washington	Bob Hermann
Wheeler	Thomas W. Cutsforth

== See also ==
- Oregon primary election, 2006
- Oregon gubernatorial election, 2006
- Portland, Oregon area elections, 2006
- Seventy-third Oregon Legislative Assembly
- Seventy-fourth Oregon Legislative Assembly

2004 elections 73rd legislature 2005–2006	2006 elections Seventy-fourth Oregon Legislative Assembly; 2007-2008	2008 elections 75th legislature 2009–2010
