= 73rd Oregon Legislative Assembly =

←	72nd Legislative Assembly	74th Legislative Assembly	→
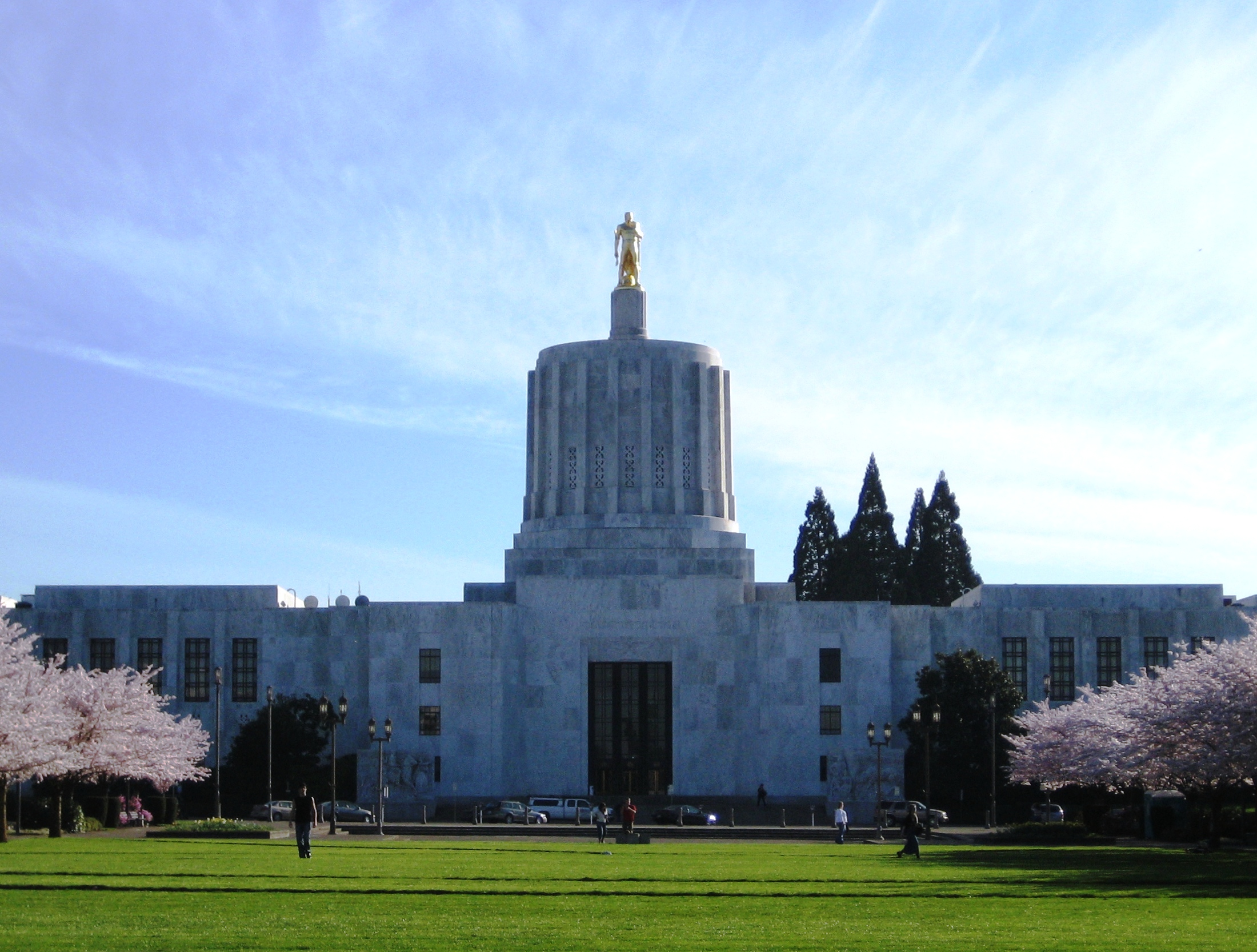
- The legislature took place in the Oregon State Capitol, seen here in 2007

Overview
- Legislative body: Oregon Legislative Assembly
- Jurisdiction: Oregon, United States
- Meeting place: Oregon State Capitol
- Term: 2005–2006

Oregon State Senate
- Members: 30 Senators
- Senate President: Peter Courtney
- Majority Leader: Kate Brown
- Minority Leader: Ted Ferrioli
- Party control: Democratic Party

Oregon House of Representatives
- Members: 60 Representatives
- Speaker of the House: Karen Minnis
- Majority Leader: Wayne Scott
- Minority Leader: Jeff Merkley
- Party control: Republican Party

The Seventy-Third Oregon Legislative Assembly was the Oregon Legislative Assembly (OLA)'s period from 2005 to 2006. (The Legislative Assembly is the legislative body of the U.S. state of Oregon, composed of the Oregon State Senate and the Oregon House of Representatives.) The regular session was from January 10, 2005 to August 5, and a one-day special session on April 20, 2006.

The Senate was controlled by the Democratic Party of Oregon during the 73rd legislature, and the House was controlled by the Oregon Republican Party.

The 2005 regular session was the second longest in Oregon history, lasting 208 days, from January until August.

Two members of the House (Dan Doyle, R-Salem and Kelley Wirth, D-Corvallis) resigned due to unrelated scandals in 2005.

== Partisan control ==
Affiliation	Senators	Representatives
Democratic Party	17	27
Republican Party	11	33
Independent	2	0
Total	30	60

== Senators of the 2005 Legislative Session ==
Senate President: Peter Courtney (D-11 Salem)
President Pro Tem: Margaret Carter (D-22 Portland)
Majority Leader: Kate Brown (D-21 Portland)
Minority Leader: Ted Ferrioli (R-30 John Day)

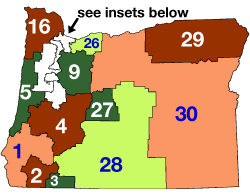
State Senate districts

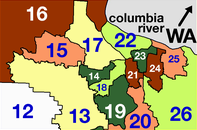
Portland Senate districts

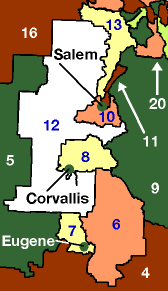
Willamette Valley Senate districts

District	Name	Party
1-Roseburg	Jeff Kruse	Republican
2-Central Point	Jason Atkinson	Republican
3-Ashland	Alan C. Bates	Democrat
4-S. Lane/N. Douglas	Floyd Prozanski	Democrat
5-Coos Bay	Joanne Verger	Democrat
6-Springfield	Bill Morrisette	Democrat
7-Eugene	Vicki Walker	Democrat
8-Albany	Frank Morse	Republican
9-Molalla	Roger Beyer	Republican
10-Salem	Jackie Winters	Republican
11-Salem	Peter Courtney	Democrat
12-McMinnville	Gary George	Republican
13-Hillsboro	Charles Starr	Republican
14-Beaverton	Ryan Deckert	Democrat
15-Hillsboro	Bruce Starr	Republican
16-Scappose	Joan Dukes, then Betsy Johnson	Democrat
17-Beaverton	Charlie Ringo	Democrat
18-Portland	Ginny Burdick	Democrat
19-Tualatin	Richard Devlin	Democrat
20-Canby	Kurt Schrader	Democrat
21-Portland	Kate Brown	Democrat
22-Portland	Margaret Carter	Democrat
23-Portland	Avel Gordly	Democrat, then independent
24-Portland	Frank Shields	Democrat
25-Gresham	Laurie Monnes Anderson	Democrat
26-Mt. hood	Rick Metsger	Democrat
27-Tumalo	Ben Westlund	Republican, then independent
28-Klamath Falls	Doug Whitsett	Republican
29-Pendleton	David Nelson	Republican
30-John Day	Ted Ferrioli	Republican

== Representatives ==
Speaker: Karen Minnis (R-49 Wood Village)
Speaker Pro Tempore: Dennis Richardson (R-4 Central Point)
Majority Leader: Wayne Scott (R-39 Oregon City)
Assistant Majority Leader: Debi Farr (R-14 Eugene)
Assistant Majority Leader: Billy Dalto (R-21 Salem)
Majority Whip: Derrick Kitts (R-30 Hillsboro)
Democratic Minority Leader: Jeff Merkley (D-47 Portland)

District	Name	Party
1-Gold Beach	Wayne Krieger	Republican
2-Myrtle Creek	Susan Morgan	Republican
3-Grants Pass	Gordon Anderson	Republican
4-Central Point	Dennis Richardson	Republican
5-Ashland	Peter Buckley	Democrat
6-Medford	Sal Esquivel	Republican
7-Roseburg	Bruce Hanna	Republican
8-Eugene	Paul Holvey	Democrat
9-Coos Bay	Arnie Roblan	Democrat
10-Newport	Alan Brown	Republican
11-Central Linn/Lane	Phil Barnhart	Democrat
12-Springfield	Terry Beyer	Democrat
13-Eugene	Robert Ackerman	Democrat
14-Eugene	Debi Farr	Republican
15-Albany	Andy Olson	Republican
16-Corvallis	Kelley Wirth, then Sara Gelser	Democrat
17-Sublimity	Jeff Kropf	Republican
18-Molalla	Mac Sumner	Republican
19-Salem	Dan Doyle, then Kevin Cameron	Republican
20-Salem	Vicki Berger	Republican
21-Salem	Billy Dalto	Republican
22-Woodburn	Betty Komp	Democrat
23-Dallas	Brian Boquist	Republican
24-McMinnville	Donna G. Nelson	Republican
25-Keizer	Kim Thatcher	Republican
26-Wilsonville	Jerry Krummel	Republican
27-Washington County	Mark Hass	Democrat
28-Aloha	Jeff Barker	Democrat
29-Hillsboro	Chuck Riley	Democrat
30-Hillsboro	Derrick Kitts	Republican
31-Clatskanie	Betsy Johnson, then Brad Witt	Democrat
32-Cannon Beach	Deborah Boone	Democrat
33-Portland	Mitch Greenlick	Democrat
34-Washington County	Brad Avakian	Democrat
35-Tigard	Larry Galizio	Democrat
36-Portland	Mary Nolan	Democrat
37-West Linn	Scott Bruun	Republican
38-Lake Oswego	Greg Macpherson	Democrat
39-Oregon City	Wayne Scott	Republican
40-Clackamas County	Dave Hunt	Democrat
41-Milwaukie	Carolyn Tomei	Democrat
42-Portland	Diane Rosenbaum	Democrat
43-Portland	Chip Shields	Democrat
44-Portland	Gary Hansen	Democrat
45-Portland	Jackie Dingfelder	Democrat
46-Portland	Steve March	Democrat
47-Portland	Jeff Merkley	Democrat
48-Happy Valley	Mike Schaufler	Democrat
49-Wood Village	Karen Minnis	Republican
50-Gresham	John Lim	Republican
51-Clackamas	Linda Flores	Republican
52-Corbett	Patti Smith	Republican
53-Sunriver	Gene Whisnant	Republican
54-Bend	Chuck Burley	Republican
55-Bend	George Gilman	Republican
56-Klamath Falls	Bill Garrard	Republican
57-Heppner	Greg Smith	Republican
58-Pendleton	Bob Jenson	Republican
59-The Dalles	John Dallum	Republican
60-Ontario	R. Tom Butler	Republican

== See also ==
- Oregon State Capitol
- Oregon Legislative Assembly
- Oregon State Senate
- Oregon House of Representatives
- Oregon statewide elections, 2006
- Seventy-fourth Oregon Legislative Assembly

2002 elections 72nd legislature	2004 elections Seventy-third Oregon Legislative Assembly; 2007–2008	2006 elections 74th legislature
