= 74th Oregon Legislative Assembly =

←	73rd Legislative Assembly	75th Legislative Assembly	→
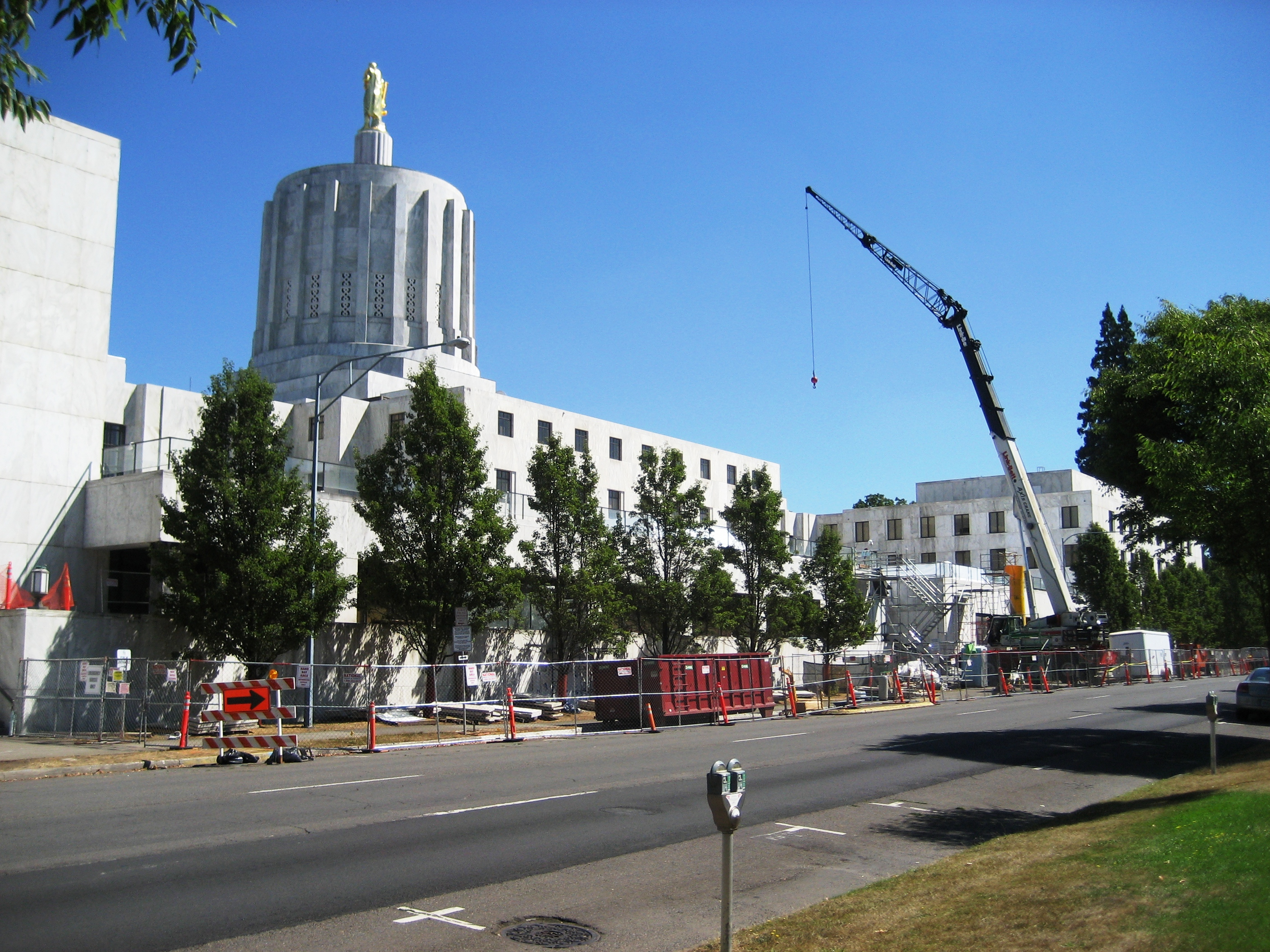
- Renovations of the Capitol Building during the session

Overview
- Legislative body: Oregon Legislative Assembly
- Jurisdiction: Oregon, United States
- Meeting place: Oregon State Capitol
- Term: 2007-2008

Oregon State Senate
- Members: 30 Senators
- Senate President: Peter Courtney
- Majority Leader: Kate Brown
- Minority Leader: Ted Ferrioli
- Party control: Democratic Party

Oregon House of Representatives
- Members: 60 Representatives
- Speaker of the House: Jeff Merkley
- Majority Leader: Dave Hunt
- Minority Leader: Wayne Scott, Bruce Hanna
- Party control: Democratic Party

The Seventy-fourth Oregon Legislative Assembly was the Oregon Legislative Assembly (OLA)'s period from 2007 to 2008. (The Legislative Assembly is the legislative body of the U.S. state of Oregon, composed of the Oregon State Senate and the Oregon House of Representatives.) There was a regular session in 2007, and a shorter special session in 2008.

The 74th was the first Oregon legislature since 1989 in which both its houses were controlled by the Democratic Party of Oregon, which won a one-seat majority in the House in the 2006 elections. (Democrats had previously taken control of the Senate in 2004, and retained it in the 2006 elections.) Democrats took credit for addressing a number of issues, and for adjourning a day before a self-imposed deadline (and before Independence Day, for the first time since 1995). Republican legislators, however, noted that there were no tax reforms to accompany the $15.1 billion (21%) increases in spending over the prior two-year budget. Democratic Governor Ted Kulongoski did not veto any bills during the session, and expressed general approval of the session. In August, after the session's conclusion, he did veto one bill which would have allocated $4.6 million in Portland General Electric ratepayers' fees to pay off a loan on behalf of the Oregon Museum of Science and Industry.

The Statesman Journal praised Kulongoski for being more engaged with the legislative process than he had been in the past. The paper also criticized the legislature for failing to take action on two critical issues, instead referring them to popular vote.

== Sessions ==
Oregon is one of only six states where the legislature meets only once every two years. The Public Commission on the Oregon Legislature, established during the prior legislative session, recommended that the state move to annual sessions after 2009. In preparation for that change, the legislature scheduled a session for 2008. This was technically a special session, but lawmakers referred to it as a supplemental session to the 2007 session.

The 2007 regular session lasted 172 days, and the 2008 session was scheduled for February 4–29, but was adjourned February 22, for a total of 19 days. During the 2007 portion of the session, a total of 2,744 bills were introduced, with 910 passing and becoming Oregon law.

Both chambers took measures to limit the number of bills introduced in the 2008 session; the Senate limited individual members to introducing a single bill, and the House permitted only committee-sponsored bills.

The Oregon Constitution dictates that the legislature must meet only in biennial regular sessions, and that special sessions must be held only in response to a specific emergency. Senator Larry George sought an injunction based on this law. The Marion County Circuit Court judge who considered the case agreed that there were some concerns, but determined that the session was legal.

== Bills ==
=== 2007 regular session ===
The Healthy Oregon Act (Senate Bill 329) was passed. Proposed by the Senate Commission on Health Care Access & Affordability (co-chaired by Alan Bates and Ben Westlund), the act also included amendments promoted by former governor John Kitzhaber and the Archimedes Movement. It is intended to lay a foundation for lower costs, improved quality of health care, and availability of low-cost health insurance for all Oregonians. (Senate Bill 27 of 2007, known as Oregon Better Health Act and promoted by the Archimedes Movement, did not pass.)

The legislature passed two LGBT rights bills: the Oregon Equality Act, banning discrimination based on sexual orientation and gender identity, and the Oregon Family Fairness Act, creating domestic partnerships for same-sex couples.

Updated ethics rules, which increased the financial disclosure requirements on local officials and commission members, proved controversial; 239 officials around the state resigned their positions the following April, when the rules took effect. Legislators and Governor Kulongoski are exploring ways to reform the ethics rules in the 2009 session.

The state ethics commission was allocated funds to hire an investigator and a trainer, and its budget will no longer be overseen by the legislature.

A new law will eliminate the "worst" junk food from public school vending machines and cafeterias.

The legislature established a rainy-day fund, but did not raise the corporate minimum tax, which the Statesman Journal called "absurdly low."

The legislature passed several new protections against identify theft.

The legislature allocated $33.5 million to offices and parking facilities at the Oregon State Capitol.

A modification to the Oregon Bottle Bill, adding water bottles to the list of containers with mandatory deposits, was passed. This was the first modification to the Bottle Bill since it was first passed in 1971. The legislature also formed a task force that will explore further modifications to the bill.

Funding for legislative staffing between sessions was doubled from the $4.2 million previously allocated.

Starting in January 2009, smoking will no longer be permitted in most bars.

Drivers under age 18 may be fined for talking on cell phones.

Three million dollars were allocated to Oregon Public Broadcasting to upgrade equipment serving rural areas.

The Register-Guard praised the legislature for increasing funding for higher education.

The Bend Bulletin criticized the legislature for failing to pass mandatory audits for local school districts, a measure advocated by the Chalkboard Project, which works for education policy reform.

The legislature referred two bills to popular vote: Measure 49 that amends 2004's Measure 37, which had limited land use regulation, and Measure 50 which would have increased the tobacco tax to provide health insurance for children.

=== 2008 supplemental session ===
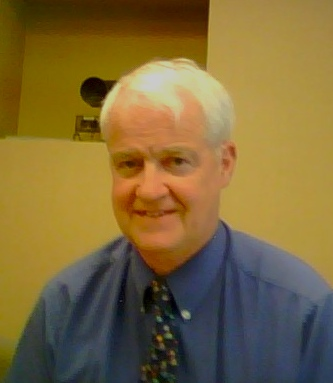
Senate President Peter Courtney

The supplemental, or special, session of 2008 opened with little fanfare in the Senate, but with charges of partisan gamesmanship in the House. The legislature was criticized for preparing bills in secrecy, without posting draft legislation on its web site. Senate President Peter Courtney expressed satisfaction with the session's work, citing laws benefitting senior citizens, children in foster care, people with disabilities, and patients at the Oregon State Hospital.

During the special session, lawmakers established a tax force to explore ways to reform Oregon's medical liability limits, in response to a December 2007 Oregon Supreme Court ruling. The task force will be headed by Senator Floyd Prozanski and Representative Suzanne Bonamici.

A bill seeking to limit the use of medical marijuana in the workplace met with opposition from Associated Oregon Industries and The Oregonian's editorial board, and was not passed.

The legislature passed a law requiring proof of residence in order to obtain an Oregon drivers license, in order to comply with the Federal Real ID law. The legislature was criticized, however, for failing to take on an idea, previously advanced by Governor Kulongoski, to provide for an alternate "driving only" card.

The legislature referred a bill to voters, a toned-down alternative to a Kevin Mannix-backed bill establishing mandatory minimum sentences for property crimes.

Three bills passed by the legislature related to land use, including restoring funding for the Big Look Task Force, and addressing funding in light of the passage of Measure 49.

== Senate members ==
The Oregon State Senate, which had been controlled by Democrats since 2005, had a Democratic majority ranging between 17 and 19 of its 30 members during the 2007 and 2008 sessions (due to the party changes of two senators).

Senate President: Peter Courtney (D-11 Salem)
President Pro Tem: Margaret Carter (D-22 Portland)
Majority Leader: Kate Brown (D-21 Portland) (2007 session), Richard Devlin (D-19 Tualatin) (2008 session)
Minority Leader: Ted Ferrioli (R-30 John Day)

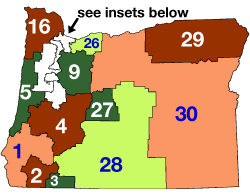
Oregon Senate districts outside the Willamette Valley.

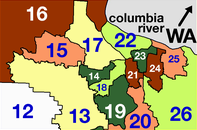
Portland area Senate districts.

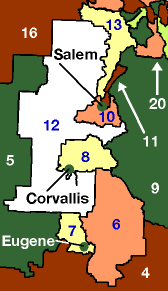
Willamette Valley Senate districts south of Portland area.

District	Name	Party
1-Roseburg	Jeff Kruse	Republican
2-Central Point	Jason Atkinson	Republican
3-Ashland	Alan C. Bates	Democrat
4-S. Lane/N. Douglas	Floyd Prozanski	Democrat
5-Coos Bay	Joanne Verger	Democrat
6-Springfield	Bill Morrisette	Democrat
7-Eugene	Vicki Walker	Democrat
8-Albany	Frank Morse	Republican
9-Molalla	Roger Beyer	Republican
9-Molalla	Fred Girod	Republican
10-Salem	Jackie Winters	Republican
11-Salem	Peter Courtney	Democrat
12-McMinnville	Gary George	Republican
13-Hillsboro	Larry George	Republican
14-Beaverton	Ryan Deckert	Democrat
14-Beaverton	Mark Hass	Democrat
15-Hillsboro	Bruce Starr	Republican
16-Scappoose	Betsy Johnson	Democrat
17-Beaverton	Brad Avakian	Democrat
17-Beaverton	Suzanne Bonamici	Democrat
18-Portland	Ginny Burdick	Democrat
19-Tualatin	Richard Devlin	Democrat
20-Canby	Kurt Schrader	Democrat
21-Portland	Kate Brown	Democrat
22-Portland	Margaret Carter	Democrat
23-Portland	Avel Gordly	Democrat
23-Portland	Avel Gordly	Independent
23-Portland	Avel Gordly	Democrat
24-Portland	Rod Monroe	Democrat
25-Gresham	Laurie Monnes Anderson	Democrat
26-Mt. Hood	Rick Metsger	Democrat
27-Tumalo	Ben Westlund	Independent
27-Tumalo	Ben Westlund	Democrat
28-Klamath Falls	Doug Whitsett	Republican
29-Pendleton	David Nelson	Republican
30-John Day	Ted Ferrioli	Republican

== House members ==
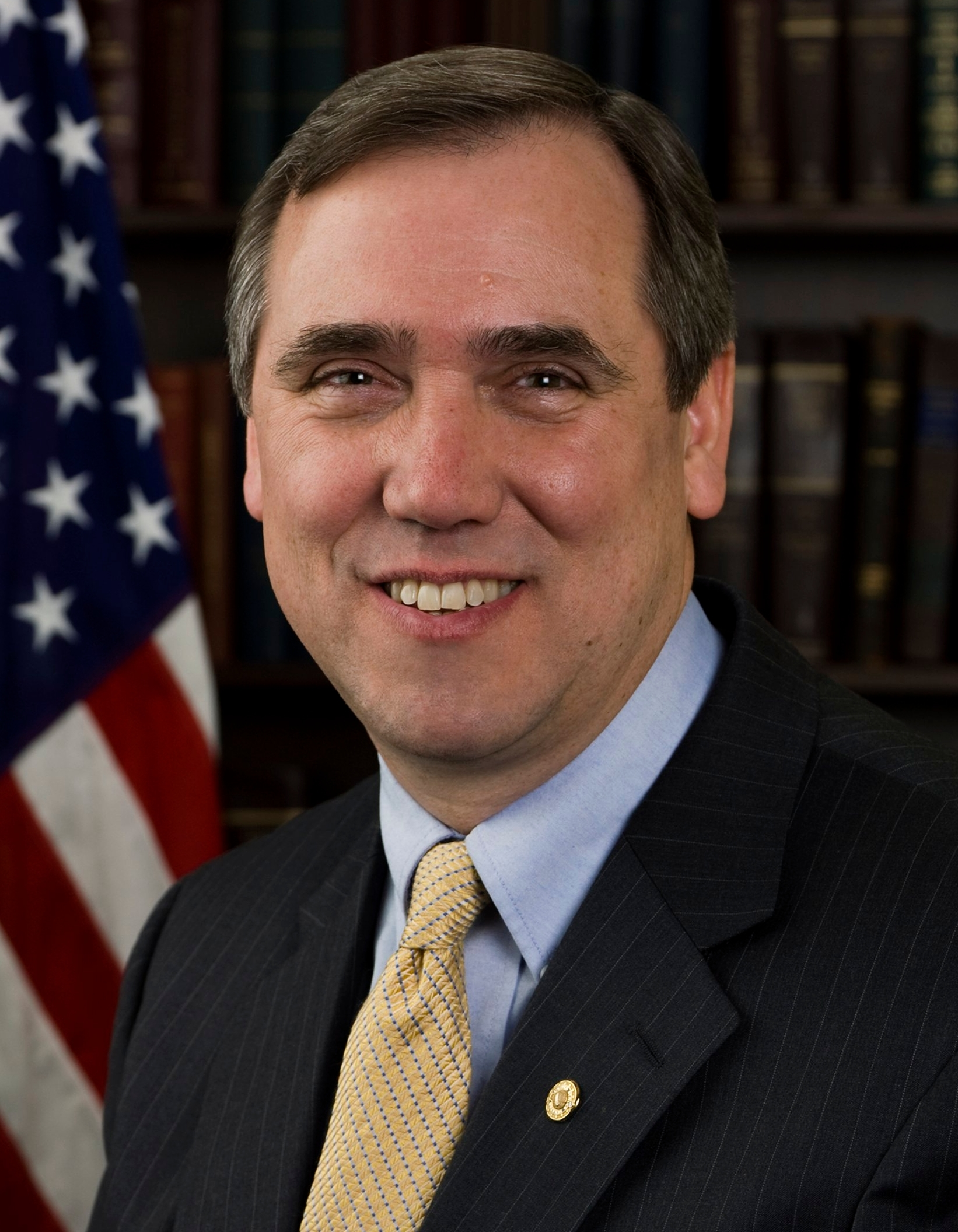
House Speaker Jeff Merkley

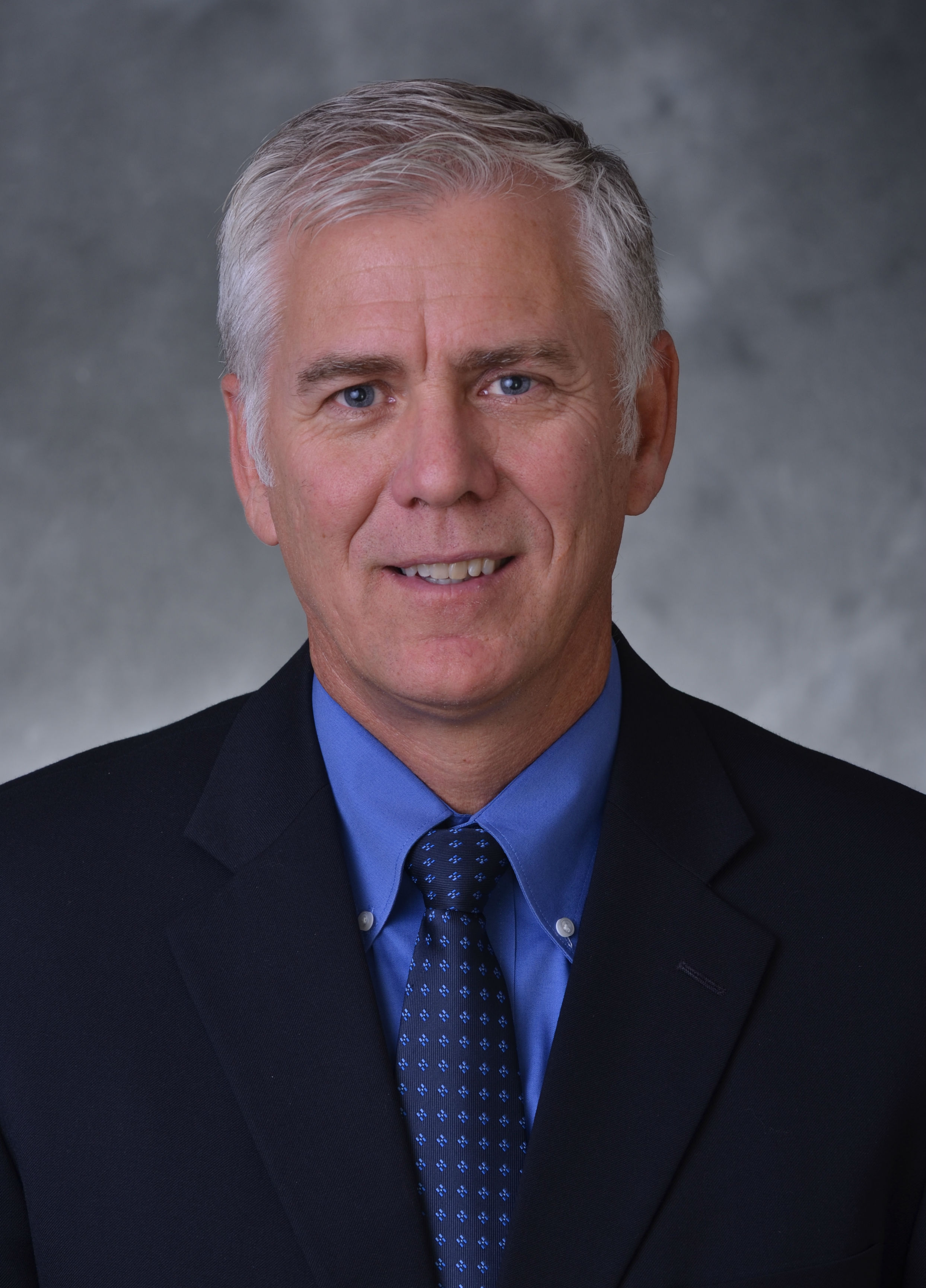
House Minority Leader Bruce Hanna (succeeded Wayne Scott in 2008)

The Oregon House of Representatives had a Democratic majority of 31-29 during the 2007 and 2008 sessions. The narrow majority did not allow Democrats to pass any tax increases, due to the state's supermajority requirement.

Speaker: Jeff Merkley (D-47 Portland)
Speaker Pro Tem: Diane Rosenbaum (D-42 Portland)
Majority Leader: Dave Hunt (D-40 Clackamas County)
Majority Whip: Phil Barnhart (D-11 Linn/Lane)
Republican Minority Leader: Wayne Scott (R-39 Oregon City), then Bruce Hanna
Deputy Republican Leader: Bruce Hanna (R-7 Roseburg)
Republican Whip: Dennis Richardson (R-4 Central Point)
Deputy Republican Whip: Gene Whisnant (R-53 Sunriver)

District	Name	Party
1-Gold Beach	Wayne Krieger	Republican
2-Myrtle Creek	Susan Morgan	Republican
3-Grants Pass	Ron Maurer	Republican
4-Central Point	Dennis Richardson	Republican
5-Ashland	Peter Buckley	Democratic
6-Medford	Sal Esquivel	Republican
7-Roseburg	Bruce Hanna	Republican
8-Eugene	Paul Holvey	Democratic
9-Coos Bay	Arnie Roblan	Democratic
10-Newport	Jean Cowan	Democratic
11-Central Linn/Lane	Phil Barnhart	Democratic
12-Springfield	Terry Beyer	Democratic
13-Eugene	Nancy Nathanson	Democratic
14-Eugene	Chris Edwards	Democratic
15-Albany	Andy Olson	Republican
16-Corvallis	Sara Gelser	Democratic
17-Scio	Fred Girod	Republican
17-Scio	Sherrie Sprenger	Republican
18-Silverton	Vic Gilliam	Republican
19-Salem	Kevin Cameron	Republican
20-Salem	Vicki Berger	Republican
21-Salem	Brian L. Clem	Democratic
22-Woodburn	Betty Komp	Democratic
23-Dallas	Brian Boquist	Republican
24-McMinnville	Donna G. Nelson	Republican
25-Keizer	Kim Thatcher	Republican
26-Wilsonville	Jerry Krummel	Republican
26-Wilsonville	Matt Wingard	Republican
27-Washington County	Tobias Read	Democratic
28-Aloha	Jeff Barker	Democratic
29-Hillsboro	Chuck Riley	Democratic
30-Hillsboro	David Edwards	Democratic
31-Clatskanie	Brad Witt	Democratic
32-Cannon Beach	Deborah Boone	Democratic
33-Portland	Mitch Greenlick	Democratic
34-Washington County	Suzanne Bonamici	Democratic
34-Washington County	Chris Harker	Democratic
35-Tigard	Larry Galizio	Democratic
36-Portland	Mary Nolan	Democratic
37-West Linn	Scott Bruun	Republican
38-Lake Oswego	Greg Macpherson	Democratic
39-Oregon City	Wayne Scott	Republican
40-Clackamas County	Dave Hunt	Democratic
41-Milwaukie	Carolyn Tomei	Democratic
42-Portland	Diane Rosenbaum	Democratic
43-Portland	Chip Shields	Democratic
44-Portland	Tina Kotek	Democratic
45-Portland	Jackie Dingfelder	Democratic
46-Portland	Ben Cannon	Democratic
47-Portland	Jeff Merkley	Democratic
48-Happy Valley	Mike Schaufler	Democratic
49-Wood Village	Karen Minnis	Republican
50-Gresham	John Lim	Republican
51-Clackamas	Linda Flores	Republican
52-Corbett	Patti Smith	Republican
53-Sunriver	Gene Whisnant	Republican
54-Bend	Chuck Burley	Republican
55-Bend	George Gilman	Republican
56-Klamath Falls	Bill Garrard	Republican
57-Heppner	Greg Smith	Republican
58-Pendleton	Bob Jenson	Republican
59-The Dalles	John H. Dallum	Republican
59-The Dalles	John Huffman	Republican
60-Ontario	R. Tom Butler	Republican
60-Ontario	Cliff Bentz	Republican

== See also ==
- Seventy-third Oregon Legislative Assembly
- Oregon's statewide elections, 2006
- Oregon legislative elections, 2008

2004 elections 73rd legislature	2006 elections Seventy-fourth Oregon Legislative Assembly; 2007–2008	2008 elections 75th legislature
