= Gary George =

Gary George may refer to:

- Gary George (Oregon politician), state senator from the U.S. state of Oregon from 1997 to 2009
- Gary George (Wisconsin politician) (born 1954), state senator from the U.S. state of Wisconsin from 1981 to 2003

== See also ==
- Gary Georges (born 1953), Haitian sprinter
