= David Terry =

David Terry may refer to:

- David D. Terry (1881–1963), U.S. Representative from Arkansas
- David S. Terry (1823–1889), California Father and Chief Justice of the California Supreme Court
- David Terry (Oregon politician) in Oregon state elections, 2006
