= Karen Minnis =

American politician

63rd Speaker of the Oregon House of Representatives
- In office January 13, 2003 – January 3, 2007
- Preceded by: Mark Simmons
- Succeeded by: Jeff Merkley
- Constituency: Multnomah County

Personal details
- Born: July 1954 (age 71–72)
- Party: Republican
- Spouse: John Minnis
- Profession: Politician

Karen Minnis (born July 1954) is an Oregon Republican politician in United States. She was a member of the Oregon House of Representatives from 1998 to 2009, and served as Speaker of the House from 2003 to 2007.

== Early life ==
Born and raised in Portland, Minnis is a graduate of James Monroe High School in Portland and attended Clark Community College in Vancouver, Washington. She married her high school sweetheart, John Minnis, in 1972, with whom she has three children: two married sons and a daughter. They also have three grandsons and one granddaughter.

While a housewife, Minnis held jobs as a dental assistant, a waitress, and delivering newspapers, putting John through college. John first told Minnis he wanted to run for office when she was pregnant with their third child. She then worked as his legislative aide for a decade, an experience she credited with providing a valuable education in politics.

== Political career ==
Karen ran for John's seat in the House in 1998, when he was forced out of office by newly enacted (and short-lived) term limits. He went on to serve in the Oregon State Senate.

Minnis served her fifth term in the House, during the 2007–2008 sessions. She represented District 49, which included the cities of Fairview, Troutdale, and Wood Village, and a portion of Gresham, in east Multnomah County. She served as Speaker during the 2003 and 2005 legislative sessions and the 2006 Special Session.

Minnis was first elected to the House in 1998 and served as House majority leader from 2001 to 2003. Her 2004 and 2006 bids for reelection drew a strong challenge from Democrat Rob Brading. In 2004, Brading spent only $33,000 to Minnis' $200,000, but came within seven percentage points of winning the race; in 2006, total spending by both candidates approached $1 million, in one of the most expensive House races in Oregon history. In the 2006 election, Democrats took control of the House. After the election, Minnis stated she would not seek any leadership positions, but would instead focus on representing her district.

On the last day of the 2007 legislative session, Minnis announced that she would not seek re-election. She was succeeded in District 49 by Democrat Nick Kahl, who won a closely contested election in November 2008; Democrat Jeff Merkley succeeded her as House Speaker.

== Electoral history ==
2004 Oregon State Representative, 49th district
Party	Candidate	Votes	%
Republican	Karen Minnis	12,038	53.1
Democratic	Rob Brading	10,514	46.4
Write-in		103	0.5
Total votes		22,655	100%

2006 Oregon State Representative, 49th district
Party	Candidate	Votes	%
Republican	Karen Minnis	8,601	51.8
Democratic	Rob Brading	7,911	47.6
Write-in		92	0.6
Total votes		16,604	100%

Political offices
Preceded by Mark Simmons	Speaker of the Oregon House of Representatives; 2003-2006	Succeeded by Jeff Merkley
