= Jeannette Hamby =

American politician

Member of the Oregon State Senate
- In office 1983–1999
- Succeeded by: Charles Starr
- Constituency: Washington County

Member of the Oregon House of Representatives
- In office 1981–1983
- Preceded by: Al Young
- Succeeded by: Al Young

Personal details
- Born: March 15, 1933 Virginia, Minnesota, U.S.
- Died: January 27, 2012 (aged 78) Hillsboro, Oregon, U.S.
- Party: Republican
- Spouse(s): Eugene Hamby; 2 children
- Education: University of Minnesota; Oregon State University; Oregon Health & Science University
- Occupation: Nurse, educator, politician

Jeannette Hamby (March 15, 1933 – January 27, 2012) was an American politician and nurse in Oregon. A native of Minnesota, she worked as an airline attendant, nurse, and educator before entering local politics. A Republican, she served in both chambers of the Oregon Legislature, winning re-election three times to the Oregon State Senate.

== Early life ==
Hamby was born as Jeannette Carrie Anne Johnson in 1933 in Minnesota. She grew up in Virginia, Minnesota, a mining town in the Mesabi Iron Range. She was born to immigrants from Finland and only learned English after starting school. After high school she attended the University of Minnesota where she graduated in 1956 with a degree in nursing and public health education.

She then became a stewardess for an airline and moved to Seattle, Washington. There she met Eugene Hamby on a triple date, and they were soon married. They had two daughters, Tenya and Taryn. Eugene, whose father owned the Chevrolet dealership in Hillsboro, Oregon, was serving in the Air Defense Command when they were married. The couple moved to Hillsboro after Eugene was told officer's wives were not supposed to work.

In Hillsboro, Eugene Hamby worked for his father while Jeannette began working for Washington County as a public health nurse. She then continued her education, earning a master's degree from Oregon Health Sciences University (now Oregon Health & Science University) in nursing education and then a doctorate in vocational and career education from Oregon State University in 1977 on the same day as her oldest daughter graduated from Hillsboro High School. Hamby then worked for the Washington County Education Service District as a career education coordinator.

== Political career ==
Hamby began her political career when she was elected to the Hillsboro Union High School Board in 1971. She was the first woman ever on the school board, and served until 1981 when she was elected to higher office. While on the board she fought against allowing the teaching of creationism in the district. In 1980, Hamby ran against Democrat Al Young to serve District 4 in the Oregon House of Representatives. She defeated the incumbent Young in the November election. Fellow Republican and state senator Nancy Ryles had encouraged Hamby to run for the office.

In September 1981, she announced she would run for a newly created district in the Oregon State Senate in the 1982 elections. She won her primary and then again in the November election to represent District 5 and Washington County for a four-year term. Hamby won re-election to another term in 1986, and again in 1990 after she ran unopposed in the Republican primary in May. After winning another four-year term in 1994, Hamby faced conservative Republican Charles Starr in the Republican primary in 1998.

She lost to Starr in the May election, and Starr went on to win the seat in the November election.

It's difficult for me to rationalize why, when they can't carry (guns) into PDX or a post office today or any federal property, why they need to carry them to pick up their little first-grader.

— Jeannette Hamby

A self-proclaimed progressive, she worked to pass a law that prohibited corporal punishment in schools in the state and another law that requires health care providers to report babies affected by illegal drugs. The law against corporal punishment was spurred by an incident where four adults at a private school beat an eight-year-old girl to death. She is also an environmentalist due to her witnessing the destruction of the land around her hometown from open-pit mining. Other offices she has held include as chairperson of the Western States Conference on Recycling and serving on the Hanford Waste Board.

Hamby was considered as a possible candidate for the Republican nomination in Oregon's 1st congressional district for 1992.

While state senator in 1983 she was invited by the Council for Human Rights in Latin America to tour Nicaragua. After the trip she stated the administration of U.S. President Ronald Reagan had given her "outright lies" about the Sandinistas and their activities and U.S. involvement in the region. This led her to become a supporter of the Sandinistas, as well as to take other trips to Honduras and El Salvador. While in the latter she served as a human shield to help protect the president of that country's Human Rights Commission in 1984. She returned to Nicaragua in 1990 to observe their elections.

As state senator she introduced a bill to eliminate Oregon's Sports Action lottery game. The game allowed people to bet on National Football League games, with the revenues used to provide funding to intercollegiate athletics in the state. Her bill did not become law, and the lottery game continued until 2005. She also supported legislation to allow patients at the Oregon State Hospital and prisoners in the corrections system to receive visits from pets. The legislation was introduced in 1983 and would have establish guidelines where inmates and prisoners under certain conditions could receive the visits due to the pets therapeutic benefits.

== Later years and death ==
After leaving politics she served as chairperson of the Jackson Bottom Wetlands Preserve's board of directors. Hamby was also appointed to the Metro Boundary Appeals Commission.

Hamby died January 27, 2012, of complications from a stroke and cancer at the age of 78.
