= Oregon's 35th House district =

Legislative districts in the state of Oregon

Oregon's 35th House district after redistricting after the 2020 Census

District 35 of the Oregon House of Representatives is one of 60 House legislative districts in the state of Oregon. As of 2021, the district falls entirely within Washington County and includes all of Aloha as well as downtown Beaverton, eastern Hillsboro, and Elmonica. The current representative for the district is Democrat Farrah Chaichi of Beaverton.

== Election results ==
District boundaries have changed over time. Therefore, representatives before 2021 may not represent the same constituency as today. General election results from 2000 to present are as follows:

Year	Candidate	Party	Percent	Opponent	Party	Percent	Opponent	Party	Percent	Opponent	Party	Percent	Opponent	Party	Percent	Write-in percentage
2000	Kelley Wirth	Democratic	58.55%	Debra Ringold	Republican	41.45%	No third candidate			No fourth candidate			No fifth candidate			
2002 (Note: Max Williams was the incumbent in this election. He previously represented District 9, but was moved to this district due to redistricting following the 2000 United States census.)	Max Williams	Republican	59.93%	Geoff Sinclair	Democratic	33.98%	Carla Shults	Libertarian	6.05%	No fourth candidate			No fifth candidate			0.04%
2004	Larry Galizio	Democratic	48.12%	Suzanne Gallagher	Republican	45.40%	Diane Mandaville	Independent	4.39%	Cody Mattern	Libertarian	1.66%	Ronald Brower	Constitution	0.43%	
2006	Larry Galizio	Democratic	55.45%	Shirley Parsons	Republican	43.94%	No third candidate			No fourth candidate			No fifth candidate			0.60%
2008	Larry Galizio	Democratic	63.78%	Tony Marino	Republican	35.97%	No third candidate			No fourth candidate			No fifth candidate			0.25%
2010 (Note: Margaret Doherty was the incumbent in this election. She was appointed to this seat on September 1, 2009 to replace Larry Galizio, who resigned from office to take a position as President of Clatsop Community College.)	Margaret Doherty	Democratic	56.73%	Gordon Fiddes	Republican	43.01%	No third candidate			No fourth candidate			No fifth candidate			0.26%
2012	Margaret Doherty	Democratic	59.84%	John Goodhouse	Republican	39.98%	No third candidate			No fourth candidate			No fifth candidate			0.18%
2014	Margaret Doherty	Democratic	81.13%	John Gerboth	Libertarian	17.98%	No third candidate			No fourth candidate			No fifth candidate			0.88%
2016	Margaret Doherty	Democratic	62.32%	Jessica Cousineau	Independent	37.35%	No third candidate			No fourth candidate			No fifth candidate			0.34%
2018	Margaret Doherty	Democratic	67.29%	Bob Niemeyer	Republican	32.54%	No third candidate			No fourth candidate			No fifth candidate			0.17%
2020	Dacia Grayber	Democratic	67.13%	Bob Niemeyer	Republican	32.69%	No third candidate			No fourth candidate			No fifth candidate			0.18%
2022	Farrah Chaichi	Democratic	67.17%	Daniel Martin	Republican	32.56%	No third candidate			No fourth candidate			No fifth candidate			0.27%
2024	Farrah Chaichi	Democratic	69.0%	Daniel Martin	Republican	30.8%	No third candidate			No fourth candidate			No fifth candidate			0.2%

== See also ==
- Oregon Legislative Assembly
- Oregon House of Representatives
