= Jan Lee =

American politician (born 1943)

Member of the Sandy City Council
- In office June 4, 2018 – December 31, 2020
- Preceded by: Preston Farner
- Succeeded by: Kathleen Walker

Member of the Oregon House of Representatives from the 10th district
- In office January 8, 2001 – January 13, 2003
- Preceded by: Lynn Snodgrass
- Succeeded by: Linda Flores

Personal details
- Born: May 30, 1943 (age 83) Santa Barbara, California, United States
- Party: Republican (before 2001); Independent (2001); Democratic (2001–present)
- Education: Linfield College; Lewis & Clark College

Jan L. Lee (born May 30, 1943) is an American politician who served in the Oregon House of Representatives from 2001 until 2003.

== Biography ==
Lee was born in Santa Barbara, California in 1943. She graduated from Linfield College in 1982, and received a Master of Public Administration from Lewis & Clark College in 1989.

Lee served on the board of the Clackamas Soil and Water Conservation District from 1999 and remains on the board in 2025. She was elected to the Oregon House in 2000 as a Republican, but switched to become an Independent in June 2001. Regarding her switch, she stated, "There is still strong partisanship that stands in the way of bringing people together in the middle to form workable solutions. You cannot force someone to follow hard-line conservative beliefs that do not serve their community and do not reflect their values." She later switched to the Democratic party, and ran as a Democrat for the 51st district in the 2002 elections, where she was defeated by Linda Flores. She currently serves as an officer of the Clackamas County Democrats.

On June 4, 2018, Lee was appointed to a vacant seat on the Sandy City Council. She was later defeated by Kathleen Walker in the November 2020 general election. She currently serves on the city's Planning Commission and on the city's Budget Committee. She serves on the Clackamas County Budget Committee.

Lee was appointed by Oregon's Governor to the Oregon Water Resources Commission in 2022 and previously was appointed by the Governor to serve on the Oregon Watershed Enhancement Board.

Personal life

Lee married Michael Weinberg, a 50 year friend, June 11, 2022. She resides in Sandy, Oregon.

She has one daughter residing in Boise.

== See also ==
- List of American politicians who switched parties in office
