= John Lim =

American politician

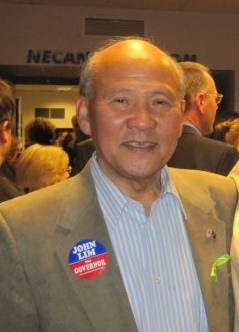

Member of the Oregon House of Representatives from the 50th district
- In office January 2005 – January 2009
- Preceded by: Laurie Monnes Anderson
- Succeeded by: Greg Matthews

Member of the Oregon Senate from the 11th district
- In office January 1993 – January 2001
- Preceded by: Glenn Otto
- Succeeded by: John Minnis

Personal details
- Born: December 23, 1935 (age 90) Yeoju, Korea, Empire of Japan
- Party: Republican
- Education: Seoul Theological University (BA); George Fox University (MDiv)

- John Lim
- Hangul: 임용근
- Hanja: 林龍根
- RR: Im Yonggeun
- MR: Im Yonggŭn

John Lim (born December 23, 1935) is a South Korean-born American politician from the state of Oregon. He has served in both houses of the Oregon Legislative Assembly and was the Oregon State Senate Majority Leader in 1995. He has unsuccessfully run for the U.S. Senate and for the Republican nomination for Governor of Oregon.

== Early life ==
Lim was born in Yeoju, Korea, Empire of Japan (now in Gyeonggi Province, South Korea). As an adolescent, Lim suffered from tuberculosis for five years, from which he nearly died. He was married in 1963 and graduated from Seoul Theological College in 1964 with a Bachelor of Arts in Religion. He emigrated to the United States in 1966, penniless. When he first arrived in America, he had no resources and worked as a janitor. He later had plans to become a Catholic priest. He eventually decided against this, however, as it would have required him to abandon his Protestant heritage. As an adult, Lim started several businesses, including a house painting and gardening business, a vitamin distribution company, and a real estate business with his wife.

He continued his theological studies at Western Evangelical Seminary at George Fox University, where he received his Master of Divinity (M.Div.) in 1970.

== Political career ==
Lim was elected to the 11th district of the Oregon State Senate in 1992. This makes him the first documented Korean immigrant elected to a state senate in America. He served as Majority Leader in 1995 and was re-elected in 1996. In April 1999, while serving as chairman of the Trade & Economic Development committee, Lim famously proposed installing signs at the state lines reading, "You are welcome to visit Oregon, but please don't stay." The signs were intended to discourage visitors from moving to Oregon, to preserve the state's economic and ecologic infrastructure as well as general "quality of life."

Lim was the Republican nominee for the United States Senate in 1998, losing to incumbent Democrat Ron Wyden.

Oregon's term limit law was still in effect at the conclusion of his second Senate term, so he left the Senate following the 1999 Legislative session. Lim was succeeded by fellow Republican John Minnis.

In 2004, Lim was elected State Representative of District 50. He was re-elected to that office in 2006, serving in the 73rd Oregon Legislative Assembly and the 74th Oregon Legislative Assembly.

John Lim lost his bid for re-election to the Oregon House in the 2008 general election. Former police officer Greg Matthews, a Democrat, took over representation of Oregon's 50th District in January 2009.

Lim was a candidate for the Republican nomination for Oregon governor in 2010. He came in third out of nine, behind the primary winner Chris Dudley and second-place finisher Allen Alley.

== Electoral history ==
2004 Oregon State Representative, 50th district
Party	Candidate	Votes	%
Republican	John Lim	13,489	51.4
Democratic	Jim Buck	12,297	46.8
Constitution	Allan Page	396	1.5
Write-in		75	0.3
Total votes		26,257	100%

2006 Oregon State Representative, 50th district
Party	Candidate	Votes	%
Republican	John Lim	11,362	62.9
Democratic	Jill Selman-Ringer	6,107	33.8
Libertarian	Brian D. Lowery	557	3.1
Write-in		48	0.3
Total votes		18,074	100%

2008 Oregon State Representative, 50th district
Party	Candidate	Votes	%
Democratic	Greg Matthews	13,868	54.5
Republican	John Lim	11,487	45.2
Write-in		70	0.3
Total votes		25,425	100%

Party political offices
Preceded by Gordon Smith	Republican nominee for U.S. Senator from Oregon (Class 3); 1998	Succeeded by Al King
