= Charles Starr =

American politician

Member of the Oregon State Senate
- In office 1999–2007
- Preceded by: Jeannette Hamby
- Succeeded by: Larry George

Member of the Oregon House of Representatives
- In office 1993–1999
- Preceded by: Randy Miller
- Succeeded by: Bruce Starr

Personal details
- Born: circa 1933 (age 92–93) Texas
- Died: March 10th,2026 Oregon
- Party: Republican
- Spouse: Kathy Starr
- Children: Bruce Starr
- Education: University of Idaho
- Occupation: Farmer, contractor

Charles Starr (born c. 1933) is an American politician and farmer in Oregon. He served as a Republican member of the Oregon Legislature for 14 years, serving in both houses. A native of Texas, Starr served in the Oregon State Senate with his son Bruce Starr, the first time in Oregon's history a father and son served in the Senate together.

== Early life ==
Charles Starr was born around 1933 and raised in the central part of Texas. The son of an oil driller, he attended 19 different schools between first grade and sixth grade. Starr married Kathy and they would have four children, all boys; Bryan, West, Alan, and Bruce. Charles earned a bachelor's degree in agriculture in 1955 from the University of Idaho and then worked for a year as an agricultural teacher. He would serve in the United States Army from 1956 to 1958. He earned a master's degree from the University of California, Davis in 1960 in agribusiness management.

Starr moved to Oregon in 1962 and began working at Farmers Oil Cooperative in McMinnville, followed by a job at Pacific Farmers Cooperative in Hillsboro. He left Pacific in 1969 and spent ten years working for Flavorland Foods before becoming a general contractor in 1979. Living in Hillsboro, he remained a contractor and also farmed until retirement in 2002. He had operated Starr Boys Garden Center.

== Political career ==
Starr started his political career serving on the school board of Groner Elementary School south of Hillsboro, and now part of the Hillsboro School District. He then joined the Hillsboro Union High School Board, spending a total of 12 years on the two boards. He made an unsuccessful bid for a seat on the Washington County Board of Commissioners in 1986. A conservative Christian politician, Starr was elected to the Oregon House of Representatives as a Republican representing Hillsboro and Washington County in 1992. Entering state politics at age 59, he defeated Democrat Pat Kliewer to represent the area surrounding most of Hillsboro, Forest Grove, and Cornelius.

He was re-elected to the same seat in 1994 and 1996. Both times he defeated Democrat Marcus Simantel in the November elections. Son Bruce served as his legislative assistant during these terms.

After three terms in the House, he was elected to the State Senate in 1998, while his son Bruce Starr was elected to his former House seat. Starr was prohibited at the time by Oregon's term limits from another term in the House, pushing towards a run at the state senate. A pro-life advocate, he had defeated incumbent and pro-choice Republican state senator Jeannette Hamby in the Republican primary. In 1999, he helped to pass Oregon's charter school bill.

In the legislature he was a proponent of home schooling and charter schools, while opposing same-sex unions. Starr ran for Oregon's 1st Congressional District in 2000, defeating Alice Schlenker in the May primary with 62% of the vote compared to 38%. He lost to incumbent Democrat David Wu in the November general election. He had received support in his bid from Oregon business interests including Intel due to Wu's vote against free trade with China.

In 2002, the Oregon Supreme Court stuck down Oregon's 1992 law imposing term limits for state legislators. Prior to the ruling, Starr would not have been able to run for re-election to the state senate as he had served 10 years in the legislature, and the law limited people to 12 years maximum. He had been a proponent of term limits. In 2002, he was re-elected to a second four-year term in the Senate where son Bruce was also elected to serve. Charles' district now included parts of Marion, Clackamas, Yamhill, and Washington counties.

Charles and Bruce were the first father-son tandem to serve at the same time in the history of the Oregon State Senate. In 2003, Charles Starr created some controversy when he told a constituent in a letter to "run - not walk - to remove their children from public schools" in response to the constituent's opposition to charter schools. At the time, Starr was chairman of the Senate Education Committee, and in June 2003 his lawn was filled with plastic pink flamingos paid for by a fundraising campaign at a local elementary school. Democrats called for Starr to be replaced as chairman of the education committee. During the 2005 legislative session he served as vice chairman of the Education and Workforce Committee, and as vice chairman of the Judiciary Committee in the Senate.

In the May 2006 Republican primary, Charles lost to Larry George who would then win the general election in November, and joined his own father in the Senate. The loss was attributed in part to Starr's voting record that included raising taxes, with an anti-tax group contributing $50,000 to his opponent during the election. With the loss in the primary, Charles' time in the Oregon Legislative Assembly ended after 14 years.

== Later years ==
After leaving the legislature Starr began working as a lobbyist at the state capitol in 2007. He publicly opposed a bill that prohibited discrimination based on sexual orientation that same year. He also came out against dual-language immersion programs over concerns that teachers were not properly trained and students would not be able to learn to read at an early age.

== See also ==
- Gary George (Oregon politician)
