= Jeff Kropf =

American politician

Jeff Kropf (born February 7, 1959) is a former Oregon State Representative and fifth generation Oregon farmer from Halsey, Oregon. Kropf served as Chairman of the House Agriculture Committee for two legislative sessions and served two sessions on the Transportation and General Government Ways and Means subcommittees and full Ways and Means for two years. Kropf currently lives on the family farm in Halsey after owning a farm for 17 years north of Sublimity, and has owned several small businesses. He currently hosts a daily morning political radio talk show on KSLM in Salem while also farming in Halsey and is the executive director of the Oregon Capitol Watch Foundation. He is the former state director of the Oregon chapter of Americans for Prosperity.

Jeff co-founded Oregon Connections Academy (now Oregon Charter Academy) in 2005, an online K-12 public charter school that now serves approximately 5000 students. He served as board President until retiring in 2020.

== Early life ==
Kropf was born on February 7, 1959, in Albany, Oregon. In 1995 he married Peggy Sue McCauley and became step father to Peggy Sue's son Cris. They divorced in 2019.

== Political career ==
Former Representative Jeff Kropf, a Republican, served Oregon House District 17, which consists of Linn and Marion counties. House District 17 includes the cities of Sweet Home, Lebanon, Scio, Stayton, Sublimity and the cities of the Santiam Canyon.

He served as Chairman of the House Agriculture Committee for two legislative sessions and served two sessions on the Transportation and Ways and Means subcommittees.

As Chairman of the Agriculture Committee, he participated in the formulation and passage of the 2002 Federal Farm Bill, including provisions beneficial to Oregon's specialty crops and rural communities.

He also served as a member of the full Joint Ways and Means Committee, and was also assigned to the Ways and Means Natural Resource and General Government Sub-Committees.

Over the 2004 Thanksgiving holiday, Kropf visited Oregon National Guard Combat Infantry Troops serving in Iraq, broadcasting live reports and interviews with Oregon soldiers as a member of the embedded media. He repeated that role in 2006 in Afghanistan again with the Oregon National Guard Combat Infantry Units.

Kropf dropped out of his race for reelection in 2006 after learning that his on-air time as a radio host would require his radio station to grant free air time to his Democratic opponent, Dan Thackaberry. Fred Girod was chosen to succeed him by the Republican party, and won the general election.

== Awards ==
Kropf has received numerous awards from conservative business and government watchdog organizations and is a founding member of the New Budget Coalition.

== The Jeff Kropf Show ==
Previously he hosted a conservative talk radio show on 1360 KUIK in Hillsboro, Oregon called "The Jeff Kropf Show." This show no longer airs.

== Political Coffee with Jeff Kropf ==
Kropf currently hosts a conservative talk radio show on AM 1220 and 104.3 FM out of Salem, Oregon every weekday from 6AM-7AM (PST). Listeners are encouraged to call in, or email the show, focusing on current local political happenings. The show is tagged as “a little politics with your morning coffee”. The show offers a daily podcast of each morning show.

== See also ==
- 73rd Oregon Legislative Assembly
- Oregon's statewide elections, 2006
