= Bruce Hanna =

American politician (born 1960)

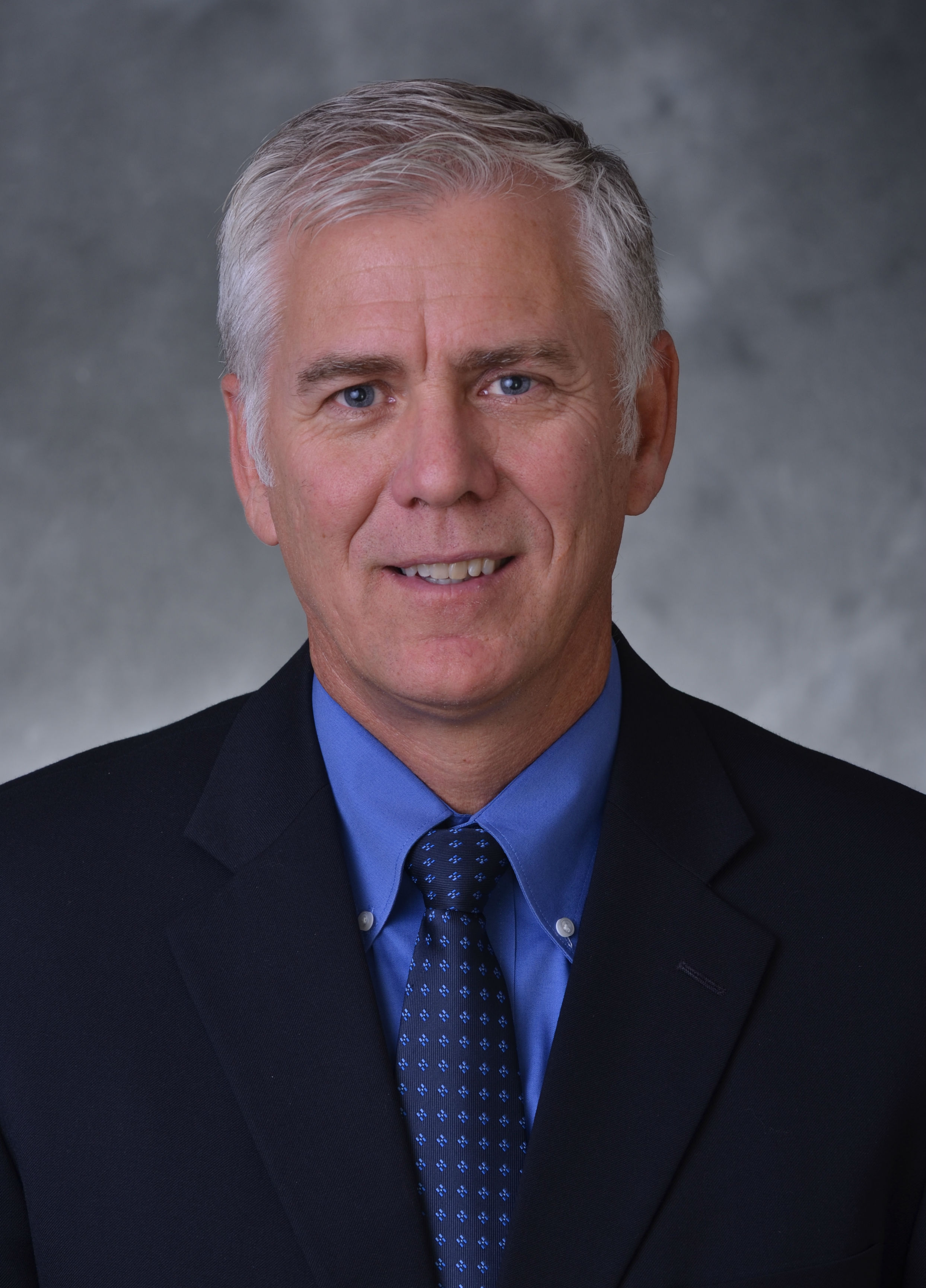

66th Speaker of the Oregon House of Representatives
- In office January 10, 2011 – January 14, 2013; Served with Arnie Roblan
- Preceded by: Dave Hunt
- Succeeded by: Tina Kotek

Member of the Oregon House of Representatives from the 7th district
- In office January 2005 – January 2015
- Preceded by: Jeff Kruse
- Succeeded by: Cedric Ross Hayden

Personal details
- Born: April 1960 (age 66) Roseburg, Oregon, U.S.
- Party: Republican
- Spouse: Teresa Hanna
- Education: Umpqua Community College; Northwest Christian University

Bruce Hanna (born April 1960) is an American Republican politician from Roseburg in the U.S. state of Oregon. He served in the Oregon House of Representatives, representing District 7, which spans Lane and Douglas counties. He was the co-speaker of the House for the 2011–2012 session along with Democrat Arnie Roblan. He is the last Republican to hold the position of speaker of the House to date.

== Political career ==
Hanna was first appointed to the House in 2004, to fill a seat vacated by fellow Republican Jeff Kruse. In that session, Hanna served on the House Interim Committee on Agriculture and Natural Resources. He is the president of the Roseburg Coca-Cola Bottling Plant.

He was chosen as minority leader in August 2007, to serve for the remainder of the 74th Oregon legislature. In that capacity he succeeded Wayne Scott, who resigned the post and did not seek reelection in 2008.

The outcome of the 2010 Oregon House of Representatives elections left the House in a 30–30 tie. Hanna was elected by his colleagues to serve as co-speaker of the Oregon House of Representatives for the 76th Legislative Assembly, along with Democrat Arnie Roblan.

Hanna did not seek reelection in 2014. He was succeeded by Republican Cedric Ross Hayden, a dentist and rancher from Fall Creek.

== Electoral history ==
2004 Oregon State Representative, 7th district
| Party | Candidate | Votes | % |
|---|---|---|---|
| Republican | Bruce L. Hanna | 18,012 | 62.1 |
| Democratic | Shirley A. Cairns | 10,952 | 37.8 |
| Write-in | | 44 | 0.2 |
| Total votes | | 29,008 | 100% |

2006 Oregon State Representative, 7th district
| Party | Candidate | Votes | % |
|---|---|---|---|
| Republican | Bruce Hanna | 15,505 | 95.9 |
| Write-in | | 664 | 4.1 |
| Total votes | | 16,169 | 100% |

2008 Oregon State Representative, 7th district
| Party | Candidate | Votes | % |
|---|---|---|---|
| Republican | Bruce Hanna | 17,614 | 63.7 |
| Democratic | Donald Nordin | 9,954 | 36.0 |
| Write-in | | 77 | 0.3 |
| Total votes | | 27,645 | 100% |

2010 Oregon State Representative, 7th district
| Party | Candidate | Votes | % |
|---|---|---|---|
| Republican | Bruce Hanna | 16,066 | 64.3 |
| Democratic | Sara Byers | 8,832 | 35.4 |
| Write-in | | 70 | 0.3 |
| Total votes | | 24,968 | 100% |

2012 Oregon State Representative, 7th district
| Party | Candidate | Votes | % |
|---|---|---|---|
| Republican | Bruce Hanna | 18,459 | 69.2 |
| Democratic | Fergus Mclean | 8,147 | 30.5 |
| Write-in | | 75 | 0.3 |
| Total votes | | 26,681 | 100% |
