= Joanne Verger =

American politician (1930–2023)

Member of the Oregon State Senate from the 5th district
- In office 2005–2013
- Succeeded by: Arnie Roblan

Member of the Oregon House of Representatives from the 47th district
- In office 2001–2005

Personal details
- Born: July 19, 1930
- Died: September 22, 2023 (aged 93)
- Party: Democratic
- Relations: Aaron M. Johnson (grandson)

Joanne Verger (July 19, 1930 – September 22, 2023) was an American politician. An Oregon Democrat, she was the first female mayor of Coos Bay, the largest city on the Oregon Coast, serving four terms. She served in the Oregon House of Representatives from 2001 to 2004, and was elected to the Oregon State Senate in 2004. She was reelected in 2008 with no major party opponent in either the primary or general election.

In October 2011, Verger announced that she would not run for reelection to the Senate.

Verger was co-owner of an automobile dealership, and has worked extensively in advertising and marketing.

Verger was a graduate of Amite High School (Louisiana), Northwestern State University, and Louisiana State University.

Verger died on September 22, 2023, at the age of 93.

== Electoral history ==
2004 Oregon State Senator, 5th district
Party	Candidate	Votes	%
Democratic	Joanne Verger	30,460	50.6
Republican	Al Pearn	29,599	49.2
Write-in		136	0.2
Total votes		60,195	100%

2008 Oregon State Senator, 5th district
Party	Candidate	Votes	%
Democratic	Joanne Verger	40,012	96.8
Write-in		1,337	3.2
Total votes		41,349	100%

== See also ==
- Seventy-third Oregon Legislative Assembly (2005–2007)
- Seventy-fourth Oregon Legislative Assembly (2007–2009)
- Seventy-fifth Oregon Legislative Assembly (2009–2011)
