= Larry George =

American politician

Member of the Oregon Senate from the 13th district
- In office 2007–2015
- Preceded by: Charles Starr
- Succeeded by: Kim Thatcher

Personal details
- Born: 1968 (age 57–58)
- Party: Republican
- Relations: Gary George
- Occupation: Businessman
- Website: Senate website

Larry George (born c. 1968) is an American politician and businessman in Oregon. He was a Republican member of the Oregon State Senate representing District 13 from 2007 to 2015. Before his election, he was the leader of the political group Oregonians In Action. He is part of the second father-son tandem to serve in the Oregon Senate.

== Early life ==
Larry was born to Gary and Kathy George about 1968. The family that includes his two sisters Cheryl and Christy and two brothers Shaun and David, moved to Newberg, Oregon, when Larry was ten years old, where he was raised. Father Gary was a state senator, while mother Kathy was a commissioner in Yamhill County. He graduated from Newberg High School before attending Oregon State University in Corvallis. At Oregon State, George earned Bachelor of Science degrees in liberal arts and business administration.

George works in Newberg as the founder and CEO of his family’s hazelnut packing and processing company, George Packing Company and is the CEO of sister company, Northwest Hazelnut Company. He is the former host of his own talk show on radio stations KXL and KUIK. He formerly owned an advertising business specializing in political advertising.

== Political career ==
In 2000, George served as leader of the group Oregonians In Action that backed the passage of Oregon Ballot Measure 7, a property rights initiative. The group also supported Oregon Ballot Measure 37 in 2004 after the Oregon Supreme Court had invalidated Measure 7. George worked for the group from 1992 to 2002, and also assisted in the Measure 37 campaign.

In 2006, George ran against incumbent and family friend Charles Starr in the Republican primary for the District 13 Oregon Senate seat. The district covers parts of Washington, Clackamas, Yamhill, and Marion counties in the Willamette Valley. George defeated Starr in the primary and then won the November general election to win the four-year term. He defeated Democrat Rick Ross in the general election for the seat. He joined his father in the Senate as the second father-son team to serve at the same time, with the first being Charles Starr and his son Bruce Starr.

In 2007, the Oregon Legislative Assembly, a bi-annual meeting body, approved an experimental session to be held in February 2008, an off year for a regular legislative session. George opposed holding the session and sued to stop the meeting in December 2007. The Oregon Supreme Court in George v. Courtney, upheld the decision of the trial court and allowed the session to be held. George and political activist Ted Abram sued Senate President Peter Courtney, the Oregon Secretary of State, the Governor of Oregon, and Speaker of the House Jeff Merkley to prevent the session.

George did not run for reelection in 2014. He was succeeded by state Representative Kim Thatcher, a fellow Republican.

== Electoral history ==
2006 Oregon State Senator, 13th district
Party	Candidate	Votes	%
Republican	Larry George	26,504	59.0
Democratic	Rick Ross	18,318	40.8
Write-in		117	0.3
Total votes		44,939	100%

2010 Oregon State Senator, 13th district
Party	Candidate	Votes	%
Republican	Larry George	30,457	63.1
Democratic	Timi Parker	17,742	36.7
Write-in		100	0.2
Total votes		48,299	100%

== See also ==
- Bruce Starr
