= Steve March =

American politician and auditor (born 1946)

Member of the Oregon House of Representatives from the 46th district
- In office January 13, 2003 – January 8, 2007
- Preceded by: Susan Morgan
- Succeeded by: Ben Cannon

Personal details
- Born: September 4, 1946 Woodland, California
- Party: Democratic
- Education: PhD; Masters; Bachelors
- Alma mater: Portland State University California State University, Sacramento

Steve March is an American politician and auditor.

== Career ==
March entered political life as an appointee to the Oregon Hanford Site Cleanup Board (OHCB) in 2002 by Governor Kitzhaber, ending his term in 2006. He later came back to the board in 2013, finally leaving in 2021. He also served on the Oregon Department of Energy audit committee.

He has also worked at the College of Liberal Arts & Sciences, Portland State University as the chief budgetary and accounting officer. He served as the elected Multnomah County auditor from 2009 to 2019. He owns a farm and is the founder of Smarsh.
