= Gordon Sutherland Anderson =

American politician (1934–2024)

Mayor of Grants Pass
- Incumbent
- Assumed office 1992

Member of the Oregon House of Representatives
- In office (during 72nd Oregon Legislative Assembly) – (during 73rd Oregon Legislative Assembly)
- Succeeded by: Ron Maurer

Personal details
- Born: 1934 River Forest, Illinois, U.S.
- Died: August 22, 2024 Marana, Arizona, U.S.
- Party: Republican
- Spouse: Marilyn Holm
- Children: 2
- Education: Wheaton College, Northwestern University Dental School, University of Washington
- Occupation: Periodontist, businessman, ranch owner, politician
- Known for: Mayor of Grants Pass, Oregon; member of the Oregon House of Representatives

Military service
- Branch/service: United States Navy

Gordon Sutherland Anderson (1934 – August 22, 2024) was a periodontist, businessman, owner of Pleasant Creek Ranch, and state legislator in Oregon. He also served as the mayor of Grants Pass. He was a Republican. He served in the Oregon House during the 73rd Oregon Legislative Assembly and 73rd Oregon Legislative Assembly.

Donald and Elsie Anderson were his parents. The family lived in River Forest, Illinois and Anderson attended Oak Park High School. He then studied at Wheaton College, Northwestern University Dental School, and the University of Washington's post-graduate Periodontal Specialty program.

He served in the Navy. He served on the Grants Pass City Council from 1987-1992. He then became mayor of Grants Pass. He was interviewed by C-SPAN in November 1994 and discussed Grants Pass and being mayor.

He served in the Oregon House of Representatives during 72nd Oregon Legislative Assembly and 73rd Oregon Legislative Assembly. He was succeeded in the Oregon House by Ron Maurer.

He wrote a letter to the Oregon Department of Environmental Quality in 2010 as a former state representative.

He married Marilyn Holm. They had two daughters while living in San Mateo, California. He did dental work in Ecuador and Central America as a missionary.

He died in Marana, Arizona, on August 22, 2024, at the age of 90.
