= Ron Maurer =

American politician

Member of the Oregon House of Representatives from the 3rd district
- In office 2007–2011
- Preceded by: Gordon Anderson
- Succeeded by: Wally Hicks

Personal details
- Born: March 10, 1963 (age 63) Grants Pass, Oregon
- Party: Republican
- Spouse: Sheila
- Education: Oregon State University
- Profession: Government Affairs

Ron Maurer (born March 10, 1963) is a Republican politician from the U.S. state of Oregon. He served in the Oregon House of Representatives until January 2011. He represented District 3, which encompasses most of Josephine County, including the cities of Grants Pass and Cave Junction. He ran for Oregon Superintendent of Public Instruction in 2010, losing to incumbent Susan Castillo. Following the election he took a job as the Director of the Congressional Liaison Service for the Department of Veterans Affairs in Washington, DC.

== Early life and career ==
A fourth-generation Oregonian, Maurer was born in Grants Pass and graduated from Oregon State University in 1985 with a Bachelor of Science degree in science education. He went on to receive a master's degree in continuing and occupational education from Kansas State University in 1989, and a Doctor of Education degree from Northern Illinois University in 1999.

From 1985 to 1994, Maurer was an officer in the United States Army, serving as a medical evacuation helicopter pilot and then in healthcare and hospital administration. Following his active duty service, he served in the United States Army Reserves from 1994 until his retirement in 2006. From 2001 to 2009, Maurer owned and managed the Rogue River Health Clinic in Rogue River with his wife and was a co-owner of Maurer Properties, LLC.

== Political career ==
Maurer served on the Grants Pass School District board from 2001 to 2004. In 2006, he was elected to the Oregon House of Representatives, representing District 3, defeating Democrat Howard Owens. In 2008, he was re-elected, defeating Democrat Julie Rubenstein and was elected Republican whip by his Republican colleagues.

In 2010, he ran for Oregon Superintendent of Public Instruction, losing to incumbent Susan Castillo in a closely contested election. He gave up running for reelection for the House in order to run for Superintendent and was succeeded by Wally Hicks.

== Personal ==
Maurer and his wife Sheila have six children (Remington, Trista, Winchester, Eliza, Deringer, and Ruger). He lives in Winston-Salem, NC.

== Electoral history ==
2006 Oregon State Representative, 3rd district
Party	Candidate	Votes	%
Republican	Ron Maurer	14,394	62.3
Democratic	Howard Owens	8,645	37.4
Write-in		47	0.2
Total votes		23,086	100%

2008 Oregon State Representative, 3rd district
Party	Candidate	Votes	%
Republican	Ron Maurer	16,982	61.2
Democratic	Julie Rubenstein	10,674	38.5
Write-in		71	0.3
Total votes		27,727	100%
