= Terry Beyer =

American politician (born 1951)

Member of the Oregon House of Representatives from the 12th district
- In office 2001–2013
- Preceded by: Bill Morrissette
- Succeeded by: John Lively

Personal details
- Born: January 26, 1951 (age 75) Eugene, Oregon
- Party: Democratic
- Spouse: Lee Beyer

Elizabeth Terry Beyer (born January 26, 1951) is a Democratic politician from the U.S. state of Oregon. She served in the Oregon House of Representatives representing District 12 in the city of Springfield from 2001 to 2013.

== Early life and career ==
Beyer was born in Eugene, Oregon, where she attended Lane Community College. She was a member of the Springfield City Council from 1993 to 1999, and worked as a legislative assistant to her husband Lee, a member of the Oregon House, and later the Oregon State Senate, beginning in 1991.

== Political career ==
In 2001, her husband Lee resigned from the Oregon Senate to take a position on the Oregon Public Utility Commission. Oregon state representative Bill Morrisette was appointed to replace him in the Senate, leaving an opening in House District 42. A list of potential replacements for Morrisette was submitted to the Lane County Board of Commissioners by a Democratic precinct nominating committee, but all were rejected, leaving the responsibility of the appointment to Governor John Kitzhaber, who chose Terry Beyer for the position.

In 2002, she was elected to a full term in the district (now renumbered 12), and has been re-elected four times since then. Beyer is the Chair of the House Transportation Committee and is a member of the Agriculture, Natural Resources, and Rural Communities Committee and the Ways and Means Sub-Committee on Transportation and Economic Development.

== Personal ==
Beyer and her husband Lee have been married more than 40 years and have three children.
