= Bill Morrisette =

American politician (1931–2025)

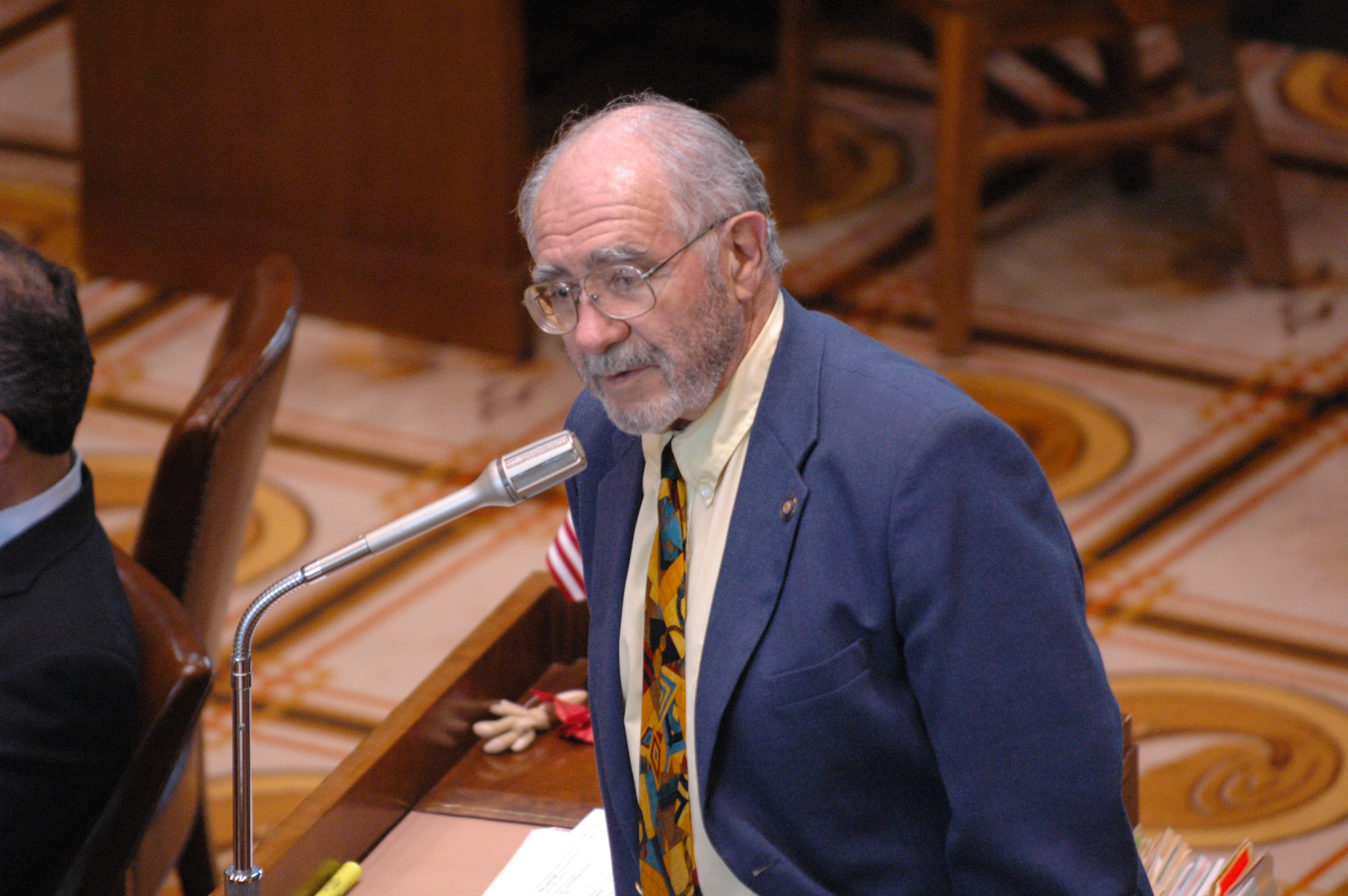
Morrisette on Oregon Senate floor in 2005

Bill Morrisette (October 18, 1931 – April 15, 2025) was an American educator and politician in the state of Oregon. He was a member of the Oregon State Senate, representing Springfield (District 6) (2003–2010). He was previously a member of the Oregon House of Representatives (1999–2002); Mayor of Springfield, OR (1989–1999); and a Springfield City Council member (1987–1989). He taught social studies at Springfield High School from 1963 to 1990.

Morrisette focused on education and human services while in the legislature. As a member of the Oregon House of Representatives, he served as vice-chair of the Education Committee, and served as a member of Human Resources and Business and Consumer Affairs committees. In the Senate, he chaired the Senate education committee during the 2003 session. He chaired the Senate Health and Human Services Committee during the 2005 session.

Morrisette was born in Anaconda, Montana, and was raised Catholic. He was married to Janice Maureen McKenzie of Helena, Montana in 1951. They lived in Portland and Springfield and were married for 61 years, before Janice died in November 2013. Together, they had eight children, fourteen grandchildren, and nine great-grandchildren. Morrisette earned a bachelor's degree in economics and political science from Carroll College in 1953, and a master's degree in education from the University of Oregon in 1966. Morrisette died on April 15, 2025, at the age of 93.

== Electoral history ==
2006 Oregon State Senator, 6th district
Party	Candidate	Votes	%
Democratic	Bill Morrisette	30,161	67.0
Republican	Renee Lindsey	14,753	32.8
Write-in		99	0.2
Total votes		45,013	100%

== See also ==
- Seventy-fourth Oregon Legislative Assembly
- Seventy-third Oregon Legislative Assembly
