= Debi Farr =

American politician

Member of the Oregon House of Representatives from the 14th district
- In office August 28, 2003 – April 20, 2006
- Preceded by: Pat Farr
- Succeeded by: Chris Edwards

Personal details
- Born: 1955 or 1956 (age 70–71)
- Spouse: Pat Farr (m. 1975)
- Children: 3

Debi Farr (born 1955 or 1956) is a former American politician from Oregon. In 2003, she served the remainder of her husband's term in the Oregon House of Representatives and was then elected for another term in 2004. She has been community relations manager for the Trillium Community Health Plan. She became a member of the legislature after her husband, Pat Farr, resigned to take a job at a food pantry. She previously worked as her husband's legislative chief of staff. She described herself as a "moderate Republican".

== Biography ==
Farr was raised in Silverton, Oregon. She met her husband when studying theater arts at University of Oregon.
