= Gary Hansen (politician) =

American politician

Member of the Oregon House of Representatives from the 17, redistricted to 44 district
- In office 1999 – April 20, 2006
- Preceded by: Al King
- Succeeded by: Tina Kotek

Multnomah County Commissioner
- In office 1990–1999

Portland metro commissioner
- In office 1982–1990

Personal details
- Born: 1943 or 1944 (age 82–83) Tigard, Oregon
- Party: Democratic
- Spouse(s): Sandi Burket (1965-2003); Marilyn Adams (m. 2004)
- Website: Archive of county commission campaign website

Gary D. Hansen is a Democratic politician in the U.S. state of Oregon. He is a former member of the Oregon House of Representatives and Multnomah County commissioner. He also served as a Portland Metropolitan Councilor for 8 years. He was elected president of the Oregon Association of Counties for a period.

== Early life and career ==
Hansen was born and raised in Tigard, Oregon, graduating from Tigard High School in 1962. He attended Portland State University and took Political Science classes. He worked as a plumber and was a part of a labor union. He married Sandi Burket in 1965, and had a son with her, Travis. Sandi died of cancer in 2003.
