= Ben Cannon =

American politician and educator (born 1976)

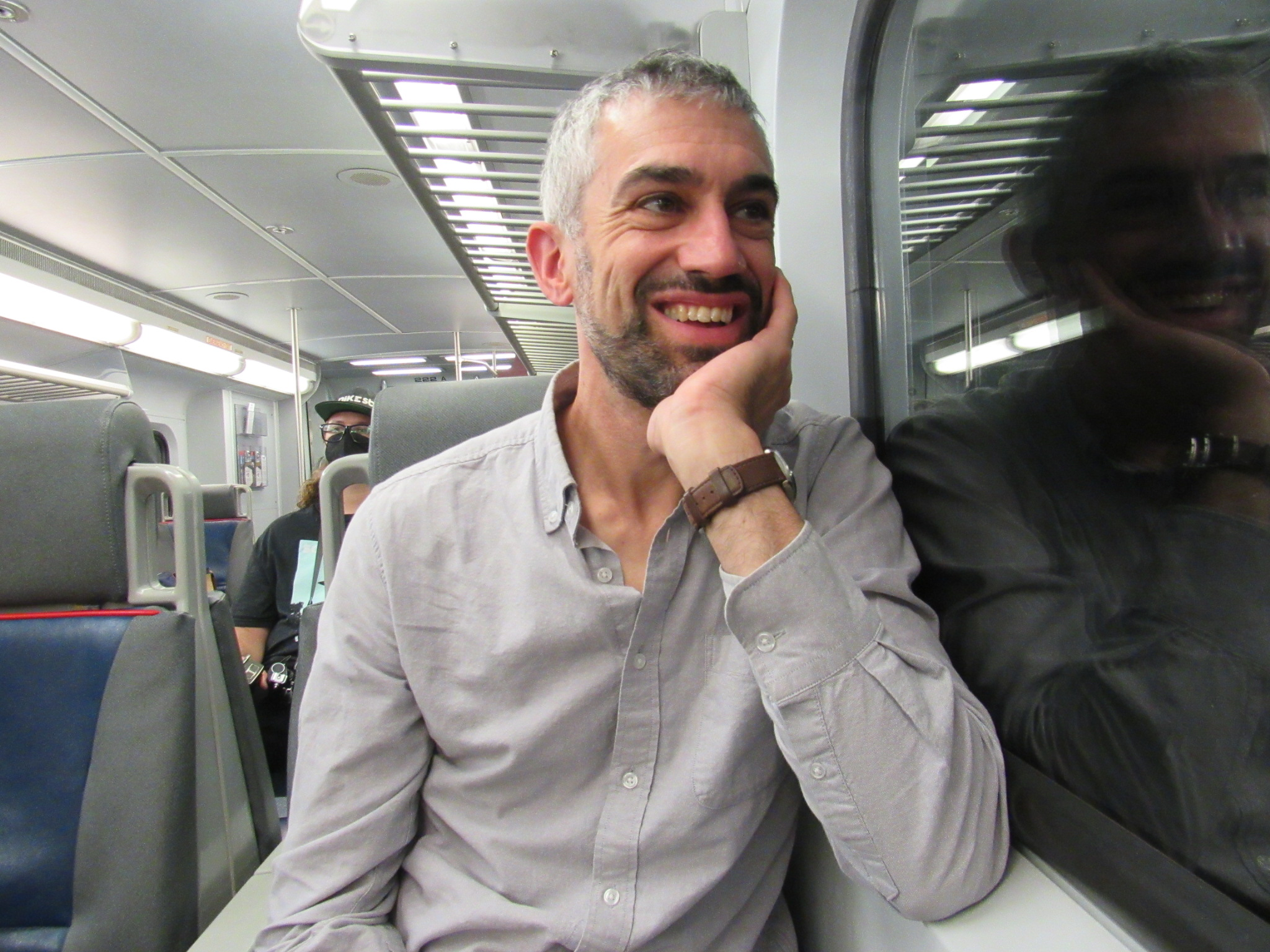
- Cannon in 2023

Member of the Oregon House of Representatives from the 46th district
- In office 2007–2011
- Preceded by: Steve March
- Succeeded by: Alissa Keny-Guyer

Personal details
- Born: 1976 (age 49–50) Springfield, Illinois
- Party: Democratic
- Spouse: Liz Cannon
- Children: Evelyn Cannon, Leonard Cannon
- Education: University of Oxford, Washington University in St. Louis
- Profession: Educator

Ben Cannon (born 1976) is an American educator and policymaker from Oregon. He was elected in 2006 to the Oregon House of Representatives, representing the state's 46th District, which covers portions of southeast and northeast Portland. He won re-election in 2008 and 2010. In 2011, he resigned to become the Education Policy Advisor to Governor John Kitzhaber. In 2013, he was appointed to lead Oregon's new Higher Education Coordinating Commission.

== Early life ==
A graduate of West Linn High School in West Linn, Oregon, Cannon was educated at Washington University in St. Louis, Missouri, where he edited the campus newspaper and co-authored Walking Historic Downtown St. Louis (2000). He won a Rhodes Scholarship to Oxford University in 1999, and went to Corpus Christi College, Oxford. There he studied Philosophy, Politics, and Economics before taking a graduate degree in Comparative and International Education. Cannon returned to Oregon to become a middle school teacher at the Arbor School of Arts and Sciences in Tualatin.

== Political career ==
Cannon was first elected to the Oregon House of Representatives in 2006. He served as chair of the House Environment and Water Committee in 2009-2010 and as its co-chair in 2011. In 2011, he teamed with Rep. Vicki Berger to pass a sweeping expansion of the iconic Oregon Bottle Bill. He was also responsible for successful legislation promoting car-sharing, clean fuels, and online voter registration. In 2009, he gained notoriety for proposing a major increase to the Oregon beer tax, which is among the nation's lowest.

Cannon was distinctive as the only member of Oregon's Legislature who refused to accept campaign contributions from political action committees. An online video promoted his effort to fund his 2010 re-election campaign by receiving $20 contributions from more than 1000 individuals.

== Education leadership ==
In August 2011, Cannon resigned as State Representative when Governor John Kitzhaber appointed him as his education policy adviser. Cannon helped shepherd the state's efforts to win a waiver from No Child Left Behind and was an architect of an overhaul of Oregon's higher education system in 2013. In October, 2013, he was appointed Executive Director for the Higher Education Coordinating Commission, a newly created position that is the state's top higher education official.
