= Linda Flores =

American Republican politician

Member of the Oregon House of Representatives from the 51st district
- In office January 2003 – January 2009
- Preceded by: Jan Lee
- Succeeded by: Brent Barton

Personal details
- Born: 1947 (age 78–79) Portland, Oregon
- Party: Republican
- Spouse: Armando
- Children: 5
- Education: Portland State University

Linda Flores (born 1947) is an American Republican politician who served in the Oregon House of Representatives from 2003 until 2009.

== Career ==
Flores was first elected to the Oregon House in 2002, defeating Democratic incumbent Jan Lee. She was reelected in 2004 and 2006, however lost to Democrat Brent Barton in 2008.

== Personal life ==
Flores and her husband, Armando Flores, have five children and ten grandchildren.

== Electoral history ==
2004 Oregon State Representative, 51st district
Party	Candidate	Votes	%
Republican	Linda Flores	14,955	53.2
Democratic	Kathryn Firestone	13,092	46.6
Write-in		75	0.3
Total votes		28,122	100%

2006 Oregon State Representative, 51st district
Party	Candidate	Votes	%
Republican	Linda Flores	11,926	57.6
Democratic	Ryan A. Olds	8,755	42.3
Write-in		30	0.1
Total votes		20,711	100%

2008 Oregon State Representative, 51st district
Party	Candidate	Votes	%
Democratic	Brent Barton	14,033	51.7
Republican	Linda Flores	13,057	48.1
Write-in		65	0.2
Total votes		27,155	100%
