= Tom Butler (Oregon politician) =

American politician

R. Thomas Butler

Member of the Oregon House of Representatives from the 60th district
- In office January 1999 – December 31, 2007
- Preceded by: Denny Jones
- Succeeded by: Cliff Bentz

Personal details
- Born: April 25, 1946 (age 80) Ontario, Oregon
- Party: Republican
- Spouse: Darlene
- Children: 5
- Education: Brigham Young University

R. Thomas Butler (born April 25, 1946) is an American Republican politician who served in the Oregon House of Representatives from 1999 until 2007.

== Career ==
Butler was elected to the Oregon House in 1998, representing Ontario. He served until 2007, when he resigned to pursue a church mission. He was succeeded by fellow Republican Cliff Bentz, a lawyer from Ontario, who was unanimously elected by the district's commissioners. Bentz was elected to a full term in 2008.

== Personal life ==
Butler's wife, Darlene, was diagnosed with West Nile virus in August 2007, however she recovered. The Butlers are members of the Church of Jesus Christ of Latter-day Saints. They have five children: Heidi, Joseph, Kenyon, John, and Melanie.
