= John Dallum =

American politician

John H. Dallum is a former politician in the U.S. state of Oregon. He served in the Oregon House of Representatives for District 59, which covers The Dalles, Madras and John Day. Dallum, a Republican, was appointed to the legislature in June 2004 to the seat vacated by fellow Republican John Mabrey, who had resigned after being indicted for theft.

He was subsequently elected twice to the House, defeating Democrats Jack Lorts in 2004 and Jim Gilbertson in 2006. Dallum announced July 16, 2007, that he would resign his seat effective the end of that month. His stated reason was to take a job as a school superintendent in Valier, Montana, a location nearer his grown children. Prior to his career as a politician, Dallum was an educator for 35 years in Oregon and Montana.

== Electoral history ==
2004 Oregon State Representative, 59th district
Party	Candidate	Votes	%
Republican	John H. Dallum	14,853	58.2
Democratic	Jack E. Lorts	10,611	41.6
Write-in		72	0.3
Total votes		25,536	100%

2006 Oregon State Representative, 59th district
Party	Candidate	Votes	%
Republican	John H. Dallum	10,733	50.6
Democratic	Jim Gilbertson	10,453	49.3
Write-in		32	0.2
Total votes		21,218	100%
