= Wayne Scott =

American politician

Wayne Scott is a politician from the U.S. state of Oregon. He was a member of the Oregon House of Representatives for the Republican Party until 2009, representing House District 39, which includes the communities of Barlow, Beavercreek, Canby, Mulino and Oregon City. He was House Minority Leader for the 2007 legislative session. He announced his retirement as minority leader in August 2007. He has remained active in supporting Republican candidates in the state.

== Electoral history ==
2004 Oregon State Representative, 39th district
Party	Candidate	Votes	%
Republican	Wayne Scott	16,476	56.7
Democratic	Doug Neeley	11,700	40.3
Libertarian	Wes Wagner	808	2.8
Write-in		60	0.2
Total votes		29,044	100%

2006 Oregon State Representative, 39th district
Party	Candidate	Votes	%
Republican	Wayne Scott	12,247	54.8
Democratic	Mike Caudle	9,214	41.3
Libertarian	Wes Wagner	819	3.7
Write-in		51	0.2
Total votes		22,331	100%
