= Larry Galizio =

American politician

Member of the Oregon House of Representatives from the 35th district
- In office 2004–2010
- Preceded by: Max Williams
- Succeeded by: Margaret Doherty

Personal details
- Born: January 27, 1964 (age 62) Los Angeles, California, U.S.
- Party: Democratic
- Education: University of California, Berkeley (BA); San Francisco State University (MA); Portland State University (PhD)

Lawrence A. Galizio (born January 27, 1964) is an American politician and academic who served as a member of the Oregon House of Representatives, representing District 35 from 2004 to 2010.

== Early life and education ==
Galizio was born in Los Angeles, California. Galizio earned a Bachelor of Arts in Industrial-Organizational Psychology from the University of California, Berkeley, a Master of Arts in Communications Studies from San Francisco State University, and a Ph.D. in Urban Studies from Portland State University.

== Career ==
At the time of his election, Galizio was the Director of the Forensics Program (competitive speech and debate) and a full-time instructor of communications studies, media studies and public speaking at the Sylvania campus of Portland Community College. He continued to teach at PCC during even-numbered years, as the Oregon Legislative Assembly only meets in session during odd-numbered years.

House District 35 includes parts of Tigard, Southwest Portland, King City, Metzger, and surrounding areas of unincorporated Washington County. Galizio served on the Consumer Protection, Emergency Board, Public Education Appropriation, and Ways and Means committees.

In 2009 he was hired as the Director for Strategic Planning by the Chancellor’s Office of the Oregon University System. From July 15, 2010 to June 30, 2015, Galizio served as president of Clatsop Community College in Astoria, Oregon. In 2015 he became president and CEO of the Community College League of California located in Sacramento, California.

== Electoral history ==
2004 Oregon State Representative, 35th district
Party	Candidate	Votes	%
Democratic	Larry Galizio	13,682	48.0
Republican	Suzanne Gallagher	12,867	45.2
Independent	Diane Mandaville	1,276	4.5
Libertarian	Cody Mattern	486	1.7
Constitution	Ronald Brower	138	0.5
Write-in		27	0.1
Total votes		28,476	100%

2006 Oregon State Representative, 35th district
Party	Candidate	Votes	%
Democratic	Larry Galizio	12,628	55.7
Republican	Shirley Parsons	10,000	44.1
Write-in		47	0.2
Total votes		22,675	100%

2008 Oregon State Representative, 35th district
Party	Candidate	Votes	%
Democratic	Larry Galizio	17,225	63.8
Republican	Tony Marino	9,713	36.0
Write-in		67	0.2
Total votes		27,005	100%
