= Term limits in Oregon =

U.S. state political office term limits

Term limits legislation – term limits for state and federal office-holders – has been a recurring political issue in the U.S. state of Oregon since 1992. In that year's general election, Oregon voters approved Ballot Measure 3, an initiative that enacted term limits for representatives in both houses of the United States Congress and the Oregon Legislative Assembly, and statewide officeholders. It has been described as the strictest term limits law in the country.

A 1995 U.S. Supreme Court ruling rendered the federal limits null and void, and in 2002 the Oregon Supreme Court upheld lower state court rulings striking down the remaining provisions of the law on procedural grounds. Measure 48 of 1996 would have instructed the Legislature to enact term limits for Congressional races, but the measure did not pass.

U.S. Term Limits, an Illinois-based group that backs term limits in numerous states, backed Measure 3, and also backed efforts in 2002 and 2006 to reinstate term limits in Oregon.

== Substance of Measure 3 ==
Measure 3 amended Articles 19 and 20 of Article II of the Oregon Constitution to limit the terms of state legislators to six years in the house, eight in the senate, and twelve-year combined lifetime total, and to similarly restrict Oregon's representatives in the U.S. Congress and Senate to six and twelve years respectively.

The initiative also placed a limit of two terms (eight years) on the statewide elective offices of Governor, Secretary of State, Treasurer, Superintendent of Public Instruction, and Labor Commissioner, as well as making various modifications, either explicitly or implicitly, to other sections of the state constitution relating to qualifications of voters and candidates for office.

== Political history ==
Although the Oregon Constitution already provided limits on the terms of office of its statewide officeholders of eight years in any twelve-year period, these limits are found among the qualifications for the respective offices, and had never previously been extended to members of the legislature.

As national voter sentiment favoring such limits gained strength, the Oregon Legislative Assembly considered broader imposition of term limits in 1991, the Senate and House passing competing measures, but was unable to resolve the differences between the two bills, and rejected limiting congressional terms outright.

Before the 1991 legislature even adjourned, a campaign was begun to place on the ballot by initiative petition Measure 3, which include stricter limits than either the bill passed in the house or the senate, and despite the publicly announced opposition of then-Governor Barbara Roberts, it faced little organized resistance. Oregon voters approved the measure by a margin of more than two to one, casting 1,003,706 votes in favor and only 439,694 against enactment.

The Oregonian summarized the arguments in favor and against the Measure put forth in the campaign, as outlined below:

=== Arguments of proponents ===
- Refresh the political system, removing legislators who had become career politicians and grown out of touch with their constituents.
- Reduce the excessive time and attention spent on getting re-elected, and dependence of lawmakers on special interests for re-election campaign funds.
- Incumbents have too great an electoral advantage.
- Lawmakers are in gridlock because of becoming locked into entrenched positions over time.
- Freed from political considerations related to re-election, lawmakers would be more free to vote on the merits.
- The state and federal constitutions already limit terms in other offices.

=== Arguments of opponents ===
- Voters can already remove politicians through regular elections or by recall.
- Term limits don't distinguish between good and bad legislators.
- The measure doesn't deal with the root problems of election finance and ethics reform.
- New lawmakers are more vulnerable to power wielded by lobbyists, staff, bureaucracy, and the media.
- Term limits won't affect gridlock, being a quick-fix that ignores complicated problems.
- Limiting terms deprives voters of the right to choose whom they want in office.

== Court challenges ==
=== U.S. Term Limits, Inc. v. Thornton ===
In 1995, the Supreme Court of the United States rendered section 20 of Measure 3, relating to the terms of members of both houses of Congress, invalid under the federal Constitution, ruling that states lacked authority to impose restrictions on the qualifications for federal office. It was silent on the broader issue of the constitutionality of term limits, nor did it address the matter of state offices, and thus the remaining provisions of Measure 3's amendment of the state constitution were left in place.

=== Markham v. Keisling ===
In September, 1997, State Representative Bill Markham, a Republican, filed suit in the U.S. District Court alleging the law was unconstitutional on the grounds it violated the First and Fourteenth Amendment voting and association rights of incumbents and voters. On December 16, 1997, Judge Magistrate Thomas Coffin ruled in favor of Markham, but later reversed himself in accordance with a December 19, 1997, Ninth U.S. Circuit Court of Appeals ruling upholding California’s term limits law, concluding voters understood the lifetime ban such initiatives imposed.

=== Lehman v. Bradbury ===
On January 11, 2002, upholding a decision by Oregon Circuit Court Judge Richard D. Barber, the Oregon Supreme Court ruled that enactment of Measure 3 had violated Article XVII, section 1, of the Oregon Constitution which prohibits multiple constitutional amendments combined in a single measure. Again, the court refrained from addressing the broader issue of term limits themselves, confining itself to the matter of their having been enacted in violation of the "separate vote" provision of Oregon's constitution.

== Attempts to restore term limits ==
Measure 48 in 1996 sought to instruct the Oregon Legislative Assembly to enact term limits for Congress, but the measure lost with 48% of the vote.

31.4% of the 113,000 signatures collected on a 2002 petition to restore Measure 3's term limits were ruled invalid, so the drive failed to meet the requirement of 89,048 valid signatures to appear on that year's general election ballot.

In 2006, a similar initiative, Oregon Ballot Measure 45 (2006) was defeated 555,016 to 788,895.

Measure 45 was placed on Oregon's 2006 general election ballot by initiative petition. It would have added a section to the Oregon Constitution prohibiting any person from serving more than six years in the Oregon House of Representatives, eight years in the Oregon State Senate, or a total of more than 14 years in the Oregon Legislative Assembly, and included language granting standing to individuals and nonprofit entities in any lawsuit arising from enforcement of its provisions. In 2002, the Oregon Supreme Court struck down on procedural grounds similar term limits which had been enacted by passage of Oregon Ballot Measure 3 (1992) by a more than 2-to-1 margin. Voters in 2006, however, rejected this initiative by 555,016 to 788,895.

=== Measure 45 supporters and opponents ===
Nearly all of the $1.25 million raised in support of Measure 45 came from the Illinois-based organization U.S. Term Limits. The $85,000 raised to oppose it came from Oregon-based lobbyists and labor groups.

== See also ==
- Term limits
- Term limits in the United States
- U.S. Term Limits
- List of Oregon ballot measures
