= Donna G. Nelson =

American politician (born 1943)

Member of the Oregon House of Representatives from the 24th district
- In office January 2001 – January 12, 2009
- Succeeded by: Jim Weidner

Personal details
- Born: 1943 (age 82–83) Paducah, Texas
- Party: Republican

Donna G. Nelson (born 1943) is an American Republican politician who served in the Oregon House of Representatives from 2001 until 2009, representing Yamhill County. She previously served as a board member of Evergreen International Aviation.
