= Susan Morgan (politician) =

American politician (born 1949)

Susan H. Morgan
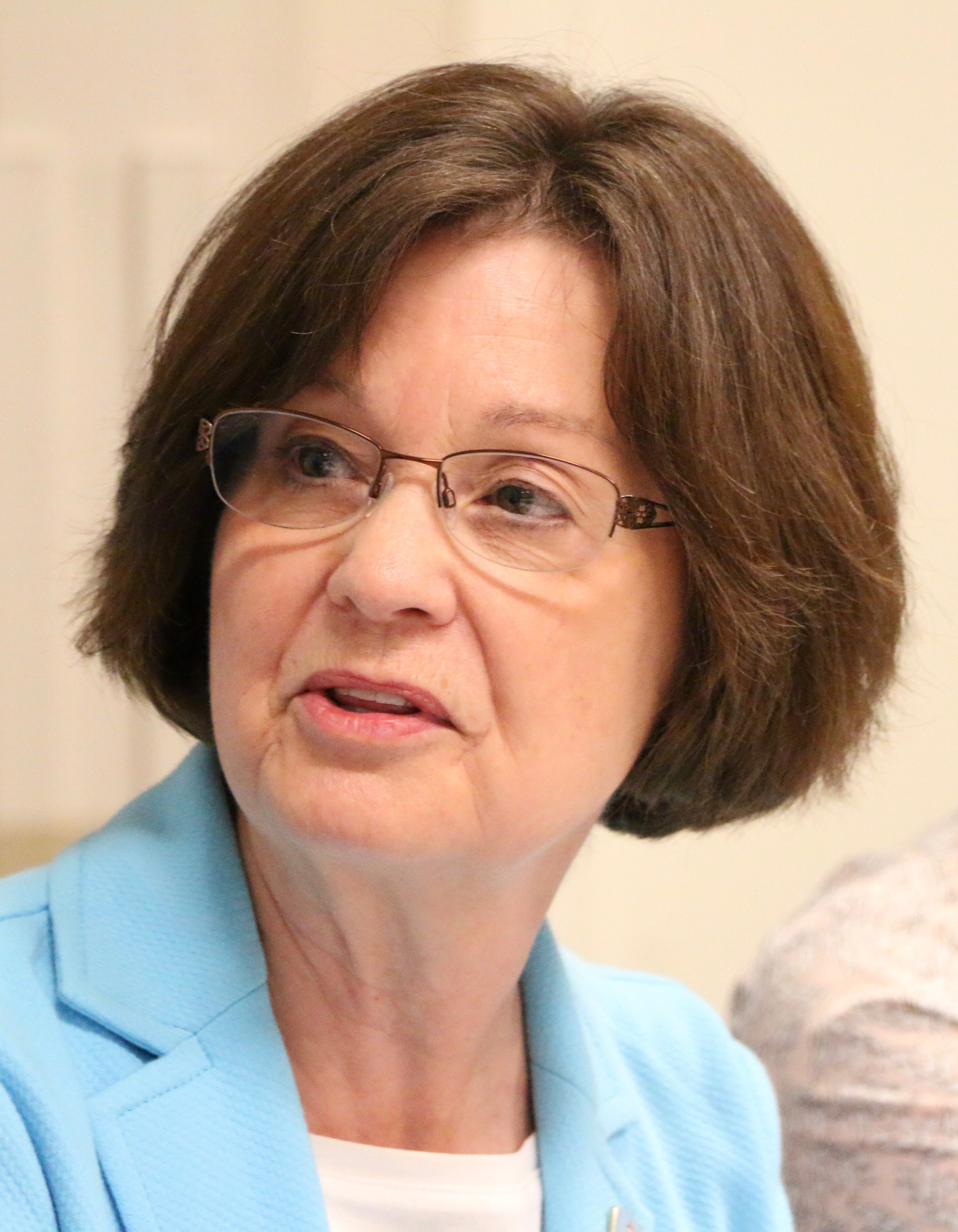
- Morgan in 2016

Douglas County Commissioner
- In office January 2009 – January 3, 2017
- Succeeded by: Gary Leif

Member of the Oregon House of Representatives from the 2nd district
- In office January 1999 – January 12, 2009
- Succeeded by: Tim Freeman

Personal details
- Born: September 1, 1949 (age 76) Nanaimo, British Columbia, Canada
- Party: Republican
- Spouse: Divorced
- Children: 3
- Education: University of Oregon; Lane Community College

Susan H. Morgan (born September 1, 1949) is an American Republican politician who served in the Oregon House of Representatives from 1999 until 2009. She served later on the Douglas County Board of Commissioners.

== Career ==
Morgan served on the South Umpqua Land Use Planning Advisory Committee from 1980 until 1998. She was elected to the Oregon House of Representatives in 1998, and served until 2009, representing southern Douglas County. Morgan was elected a Douglas County Commissioner in 2008, and was reelected in 2012. In 2015, she filed a lawsuit against Douglas County, arguing term limits on elected officials were unconstitutional. Some residents of the county started a recall effort against Morgan, but the proposal failed because they did not collect enough signatures by the deadline.
