= Gary George (Oregon politician) =

American politician (1943–2021)

Member of the Oregon Senate from the 12th district
- In office 1997–2009
- Preceded by: Stan Bunn

Personal details
- Born: November 17, 1943 Dos Palos, California, U.S.
- Died: June 19, 2021 (aged 77) Newberg, Oregon, U.S.
- Party: Republican
- Spouse: Katherine McGann (m. 1964)
- Children: 5, including Larry George
- Occupation: hazelnut farmer

Gary Lawrence George (November 17, 1943 – June 19, 2021) was a Republican politician from Oregon. He served in the Oregon State Senate from 1997 to 2009, representing District 12.

George and his wife, Kathy, owned a hazelnut farm, processing plant and a Christmas tree farm outside Newberg. They had five children, including politician Larry George.

George ran for a seat in the Oregon House of Representatives in 1990, but lost. He was first elected to the Oregon Senate in 1996.

In 2008, George and Representative Kim Thatcher led an unsuccessful effort to repeal gay rights legislation passed by the 2007 legislature.
