= Oregon's 20th Senate district =

American legislative district

Oregon's 20th Senate District as of September 27, 2021

District 20 of the Oregon State Senate comprises northern Clackamas County and encompasses the communities between Oregon City and Happy Valley. It is composed of Oregon House districts 39 and 40. The district is currently represented by Democrat Mark Meek of Gladstone.

== Election results ==
District boundaries have changed over time. Therefore, senators before 2021 may not represent the same constituency as today. From 1993 until 2003, the district covered parts of the Eugene metropolitan area; from 2003 until 2013, it stretched from Clackamas to Canby while not extending as far east as Happy Valley; and from 2013 to 2023, it did not extend as far north, with only part of Clackamas and none of Happy Valley included, while stretching farther east to reach Estacada.

The results are as follows:

Year	Candidate	Party	Percent	Opponent	Party	Percent	Opponent	Party	Percent
1982	Margie Hendriksen	Democratic	52.2%	George F. Wingard	Republican	47.8%	No third candidate		
1986	Grattan Kerans	Democratic	64.2%	Scott Carpenter	Republican	31.2%	Bob Fauvre	Libertarian	4.6%
1990	Grattan Kerans	Democratic	63.2%	Peter Swan	Republican	36.8%	No third candidate		
1994	Pete Sorenson	Democratic	64.5%	Jimi Mathers	Republican	28.0%	Jeanne Dellinger	Nonpartisan	7.5%
1998	Susan Castillo	Democratic	79.4%	Scott Austin	Republican	20.6%	No third candidate		
2002	Kurt Schrader	Democratic	55.6%	Jesse Lott	Republican	44.4%	No third candidate		
2006	Kurt Schrader	Democratic	96.1%	Unopposed					
2010	Alan Olsen	Republican	50.2%	Martha Schrader	Democratic	49.8%	No third candidate		
2014	Alan Olsen	Republican	52.5%	Jamie Damon	Democratic	47.1%	No third candidate		
2018	Alan Olsen	Republican	51.9%	Charles Gallia	Democratic	46.1%	Kenny Sernach	Libertarian	1.9%
2022 (Note: Bill Kennemer was the incumbent after being appointed on February 1, 2021 to the vacant seat left by the resignation of Alan Olsen.)	Mark Meek	Democratic	50.3%	Bill Kennemer	Republican	49.5%	No third candidate		
