= James Hieb =

American politician

Member of the Oregon House of Representatives from the 51st district district
- In office January 9, 2023 – January 13, 2025
- Preceded by: Janelle Bynum
- Succeeded by: Christine Drazan

Member of the Oregon House of Representatives from the 39th district district
- In office February 8, 2022 – January 9, 2023
- Preceded by: Christine Drazan
- Succeeded by: Janelle Bynum

Personal details
- Party: Republican
- Children: 5
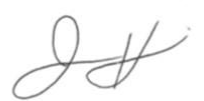
- Signature
- Website: House website

Military service
- Allegiance: United States
- Branch/service: United States Marine Corps
- Years of service: 2003-2007
- Battles/wars: Iraq War

James Hieb is an American politician who was a member of the Oregon House of Representatives for the 51st district from 2023 to 2025. He previously represented the 39th district from 2022 to 2023.

== Biography ==
Hieb was a member of the United States Marine Corps. He served two tours in the Iraq War as an Infantryman and fought in Operation Phantom Fury.

Hieb serves as Director at Building Blocks Early Learning Center. He also serves on the Canby Housing Needs Committee.

Hieb is Vice Chair of the Canby Planning Commission and Vice Commander of the Veterans of Foreign Wars post #6057. He is also a member of the American Legion.

Hieb was diagnosed with post-traumatic stress disorder (PTSD).

== Career ==
=== Canby City Council election ===
Hieb ran unsuccessfully for Canby City Council in 2020. He received 5th place out of 6 candidates.

=== Oregon House of Representatives ===
Hieb was appointed to the Oregon House of Representatives in District 39 by the Clackamas and Marion County Commissions to replace Christine Drazan, who resigned to run for Governor. Hieb ran for election to a full term, defeating educator Dr. Lisa Davidson in the primary and adult care worker Walt Trandum in the general election.

In 2023, due to redistricting after the 2020 United States census, Hieb was redistricted to the 51st district.

==== Committees ====
- House Interim Committee On Early Childhood and Human Services
- House Interim Committee On Emergency Management, General Government, and Veterans

== Controversies ==
=== Criminal history ===
Hieb has a history of various petty charges including trespassing, driving under the influence, eluding a police officer, disorderly conduct, and various vehicle and traffic violations.

=== Proud Boys march ===
In 2021 video emerged of Hieb using pepper spray, while filming a clash between the Rose City Democratic Socialists Of America, Rose City Antifa, American Flag wavers, Cops Northwest, militiamen, and the Far Right group, the Proud Boys, during a political demonstration in Portland, Oregon.

=== Arrest ===
On August 17, 2022, at the Clackamas County Fair and Rodeo Hieb was arrested while intoxicated and carrying a concealed loaded handgun. Police were called for a confrontation with a woman who had asked him to put out a cigarette. No charges were filed as the district attorney determined Hieb's behavior did not rise to the level of creating a disturbance to qualify for disorderly conduct.

== Electoral history ==
=== 2022 ===
2022 Oregon House of Representatives 51st district election
Party	Candidate	Votes	%
Republican	James Hieb (incumbent)	23,471	66.02
Democratic	Walt Trandum	11,968	33.66
Write-in		113	0.32
Total votes		35,552	100.0

2022 Oregon House of Representatives 51st district Republican primary
Party	Candidate	Votes	%
Republican	James Hieb	5,292	60.30
Republican	Lisa Davidson	3,445	39.25
Republican	Write-in	39	0.45
Total votes		8,776	100.00%
