= 2019 Oregon Senate Republican walkouts =

2019 protest by Oregon State Senators

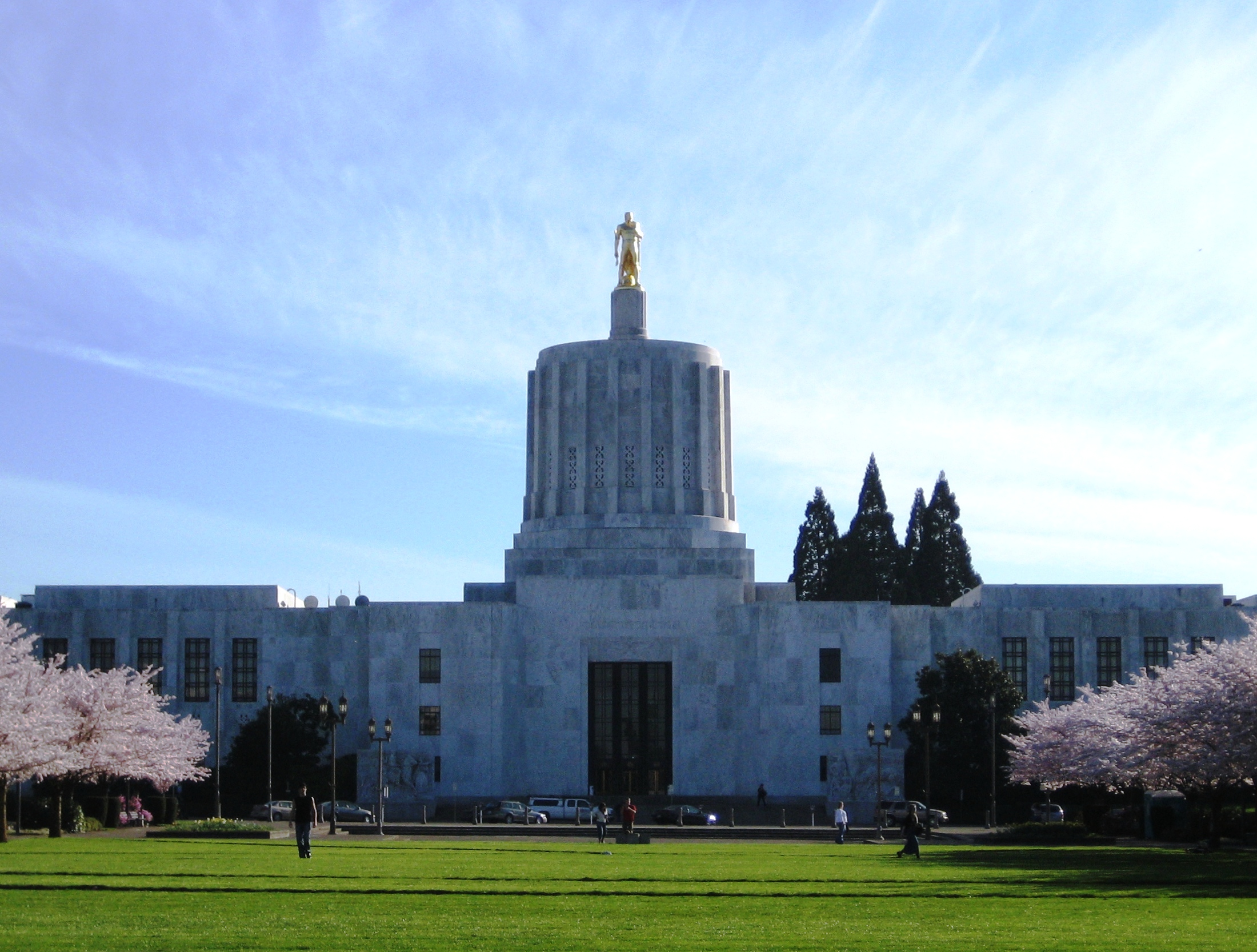
The Oregon State Capitol building

A series of Oregon Republican State Senator walkouts began in May 2019 when Republican members of the Oregon State Senate refused to attend floor sessions of the Oregon Senate in an effort to stymie Democratic efforts to pass House Bill 3427. Proposed during the 80th Oregon Legislative Assembly, the bill would have provided $2 billion for K-12 schools through a new tax package. The senators eventually returned after reaching a deal with Oregon Senate Democrats and Oregon Governor Kate Brown, but elected to "vanish" the following month over another bill, House Bill 2020. House Bill 2020 is designed to institute a carbon tax in Oregon. Republican senators argue that it would unduly burden their constituents, while Democrats argue it is necessary to place Oregon at the forefront of the fight against climate change.

Previous Oregon legislative walkouts have occurred. Republicans walked out in 2001, and Democrats walked out in 1971, 1995, and 2001.

As of 2021, Oregon Republican Senators have refused to attend the state Senate for three consecutive legislative sessions, with walkouts becoming a common obstructive tactic utilized by the party.

== May walkout ==
In May 2019, Republican state senators refused to attend senate sessions for four days, opposing a $2 billion tax package for K-12 schools. They only returned after making a deal with Oregon Governor Kate Brown that Democratic state senators would not field proposed bills related to gun control and vaccine exemptions and that a cap-and-trade bill would "reset". The two bills affected by the deal were HB 3063 and SB 978. The former bill would have curtailed religious and philosophical exemptions to vaccinations and the latter bill would have required gun owners to lock away their guns when not in use and would have made it illegal for Oregon residents under 21 to purchase firearms. In exchange, Republicans promised not to walk out again.

== June walkout ==
=== Background ===
Republican state senators in Oregon objected to the provisions of HB 2020. If passed, HB 2020 would mean Oregon's entry into a pre-existing cap-and-trade program, known as the Western Climate Initiative, run by American state California and Canadian province Quebec. The bill would compel companies and polluters to purchase credits on a market in exchange for each emitted ton of carbon. Over a timeline established by the bill, these credits would become more expensive due to scarcity, so creating an incentive for corporations to adopt environmentally friendly policies. The bill's passage would make Oregon the second American state to require reduced greenhouse gas emissions throughout its entire economy, as opposed to restrictions limited to the energy sector.

The bill is supported by environmental activism group Renew Oregon, Latino union PCUN, the nine federally recognized Native American tribes based in Oregon, and Beaverton-based sportswear conglomerate Nike. Critics from the left fault the bill for including provisions that could cause increased pollution in some municipalities and that it does not provide strong enough oversight necessary to enforce the bill. Critics from the right argue increased energy costs could cause decreased profits for certain manufacturers, trucking companies, and farms.

=== Walkout ===
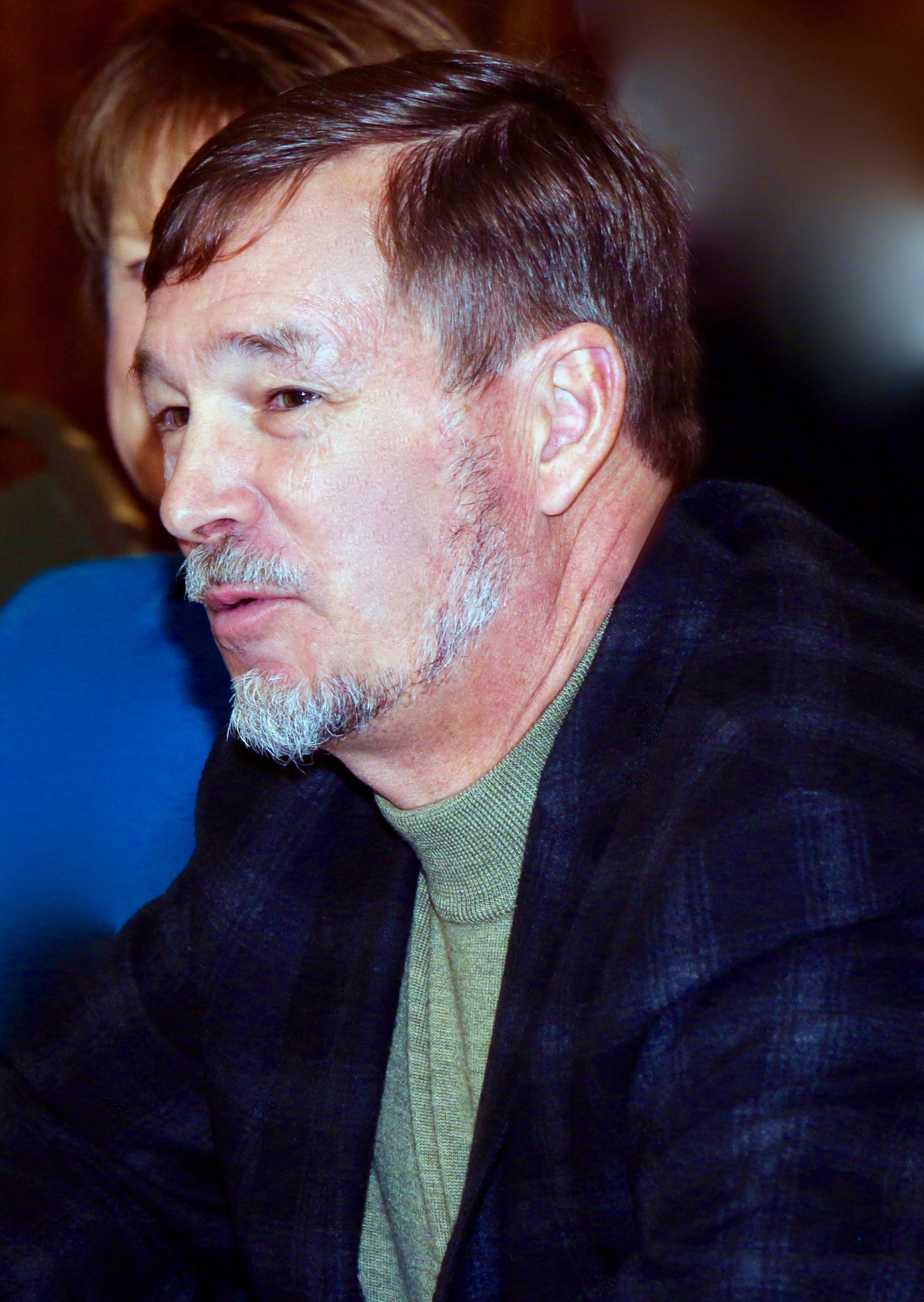
State Senator Brian Boquist

From June 20, 2019, all 11 Republican state senators for Oregon refused to show up for work at the Oregon State Capitol, instead going into hiding, some even fleeing the state. Their aim was to prevent a vote on HB 2020. The Senate holds 30 seats, but 1 was vacant due to the death of Republican Jackie Winters. Without the Republican senators, the remaining 18 Democratic state senators could not reach a quorum of 20 to hold a vote. The legislative session was slated to end by June 30, 2019.

Oregon Governor Kate Brown sent the Oregon State Police to bring the absent Republican senators back to the Capitol, and imposed a daily fine of $500 on the politicians. In response to the search by the Oregon State Police, Republican Oregon Senator Brian Boquist said: "Send bachelors and come heavily armed. I'm not going to be a political prisoner in the state of Oregon." Right-wing militia groups offered support for the Republican senators, with 3 Percenters declaring they would be "doing whatever it takes to keep these senators safe", and the Oath Keepers stating: "Gov. Brown, you want a civil war, because this is how you get a civil war". On June 22, 2019, a session of the Oregon Senate was cancelled when the Oregon State Capitol was closed due to a warning from the state police of a "possible militia threat". Additional threats against Oregon politicians and police were made on pro-Trump subreddit /r/The Donald. Due to these posts, Reddit opted to "quarantine" the group, making it more difficult to access.

Several of the senators fled to Idaho, including Tim Knopp and Cliff Bentz. Police in Idaho were not involved with the search for the politicians, as they had not broken Idaho state law.

A degree of protesting both for and against the bill had occurred in and near the Oregon State Capitol.

=== Conclusion ===
On June 25, 2019, Oregon Senate President Peter Courtney said that the cap-and-trade bill no longer had enough support among the 18 Democratic state senators to pass with at least 16 votes.

On June 26, 2019, Reddit quarantined the r/The_Donald subreddit, in part due to threats of violence made in the community in relation to the walkouts.

On June 28, 2019, Republican Denyc Boles relinquished her position as an Oregon state representative and was sworn in as a state senator to replace Republican state senator Jackie Winters, who died before the walkout. This filled the 12th Republican seat in the state senate.

On June 29, 2019, Republican state senators returned to the Senate chamber, with the attendance of 9 Republican state senators. In a 17–10 vote, the cap-and-trade bill was sent back to committee. 3 Republican state senators were missing - Brian Boquist was asked not to return because other state senators felt unsafe, while it was stated that Fred Girod and Dennis Linthicum would not return for the month's legislative session.

=== Senators involved ===
The Oregon State Senate is composed of 18 Democrats and 12 Republicans. The Senate holds 30 seats, but 1 was vacant at the start of the walkout due to a death. The 11 Republican Senators involved in the walkout are:

| District | Senator | Party | Residence | Assumed office |
|---|---|---|---|---|
| 1 | Dallas Heard | Republican | Roseburg | 2018 |
| 2 | Herman Baertschiger Jr. | Republican | Grants Pass | 2013 |
| 9 | Fred Girod | Republican | Molalla | 2008 |
| 12 | Brian Boquist | Republican | McMinnville | 2009 |
| 13 | Kim Thatcher | Republican | Keizer | 2015 |
| 20 | Alan Olsen | Republican | Canby | 2011 |
| 26 | Chuck Thomsen | Republican | Hood River | 2010 |
| 27 | Tim Knopp | Republican | Bend | 2013 |
| 28 | Dennis Linthicum | Republican | Bonanza | 2017 |
| 29 | Bill Hansell | Republican | Pendleton | 2013 |
| 30 | Cliff Bentz | Republican | Ontario | 2018 |

== Further Republican walkouts ==
As of 2021, Oregon Republican Senators have refused to attend the state Senate for 3 consecutive legislative sessions, with walkouts becoming a common obstructive tactic utilized by the party. Republicans also walked out during a 2021 special session focused on redistricting. Republicans have threatened to do another walkout during the 2022 legislative session if they feel that the proposed bills are partisan or rushed. Such walkouts have prompted the passage of Ballot Measure 113 in the 2022 midterm elections, designed to discourage future legislative walkouts from either party with ten or more unexcused absences leading to disqualification from re-election.
