= Alan Olsen =

American Republican politician

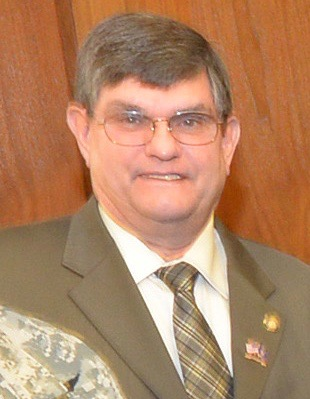

Member of the Oregon Senate from the 20th district
- In office January 10, 2011 – January 10, 2021
- Preceded by: Martha Schrader
- Succeeded by: Bill Kennemer

Personal details
- Born: March 24, 1948 (age 78) McHenry, Illinois, U.S.
- Party: Republican
- Spouse: Juanita Olsen
- Education: Purdue University (BS)

Alan Randal Olsen (born March 24, 1948) is an American Republican politician who served in the Oregon State Senate from 2011 until 2021, representing Oregon's 20th Senate district in southeastern Clackamas County, including the cities of Barlow, Canby, Gladstone, Johnson City, Oregon City, and portions of Milwaukie. He defeated incumbent Democrat Martha Schrader in the 2010 election.

== Early life and career ==
Olsen was born and grew up in McHenry, Illinois. He graduated from McHenry High School and attended Purdue University, where in 1975 he earned a Bachelor of Science in chemistry. From 1969 to 1971 Olsen served in the U.S. Army. He moved to Oregon in 1978 and has been the owner and operator of Custom Construction Services since 1987 specializing in the design and construction custom homes and commercial projects. Locally, Olsen is a member of the Veterans of Foreign Wars and is a past President of the Oregon Bass Federation Nation.

== Political career ==
Olsen was the candidate for Senate District 20. According to Willamette Week Senate District 20 was a battleground race between Republicans and Democrats. Democrats held a majority in both the state House (36–24) and Senate (18–12).

The Republican Party of Oregon for the 2010 election cycle hosted the first online primary. On July 30 the primary results were released announcing Olsen as the nominated candidate for senate district 20 from the Republican Party of Oregon.

Olsen narrowly defeated incumbent Martha Schrader by 227 votes.

In 2014, Olsen proposed a referendum to end same-day voter registration; voters rejected his proposal.

From June 20, 2019, all 11 Republican state senators for Oregon, including Olsen, refused to show up for work at the Oregon State Capitol, instead going into hiding, some even fleeing the state. Their aim was to prevent a vote on a cap-and-trade proposal that would dramatically lower greenhouse gas emissions by 2050 to combat climate change. The Senate holds 30 seats, but 1 is vacant due to a death. Without the Republican senators, the remaining 18 Democratic state senators could not reach a quorum of 20 to hold a vote.

On December 11, 2020, Olsen and 11 other state Republican officials signed a letter requesting Oregon Attorney General Ellen Rosenblum join Texas and other states contesting the results of the 2020 presidential election in Texas v. Pennsylvania. Rosenblum announced she had filed in behalf of the defense, and against Texas, the day prior.

Olson resigned from the Senate effective January 10, 2021.

== Electoral history ==
2010 Oregon State Senator, 20th district
Party	Candidate	Votes	%
Republican	Alan R Olsen	23,044	50.2
Democratic	Martha Schrader	22,817	49.7
Write-in		74	0.2
Total votes		45,935	100%

2014 Oregon State Senator, 20th district
Party	Candidate	Votes	%
Republican	Alan R Olsen	26,705	52.5
Democratic	Jamie Damon	23,930	47.1
Write-in		199	0.4
Total votes		50,834	100%

2018 Oregon State Senator, 20th district
Party	Candidate	Votes	%
Republican	Alan R Olsen	33,685	51.8
Democratic	Charles Gallia	29,927	46.1
Libertarian	Kenny Sernach	1,245	1.9
Write-in		111	0.2
Total votes		64,968	100%
