= Christine Drazan =

American politician (born 1972)

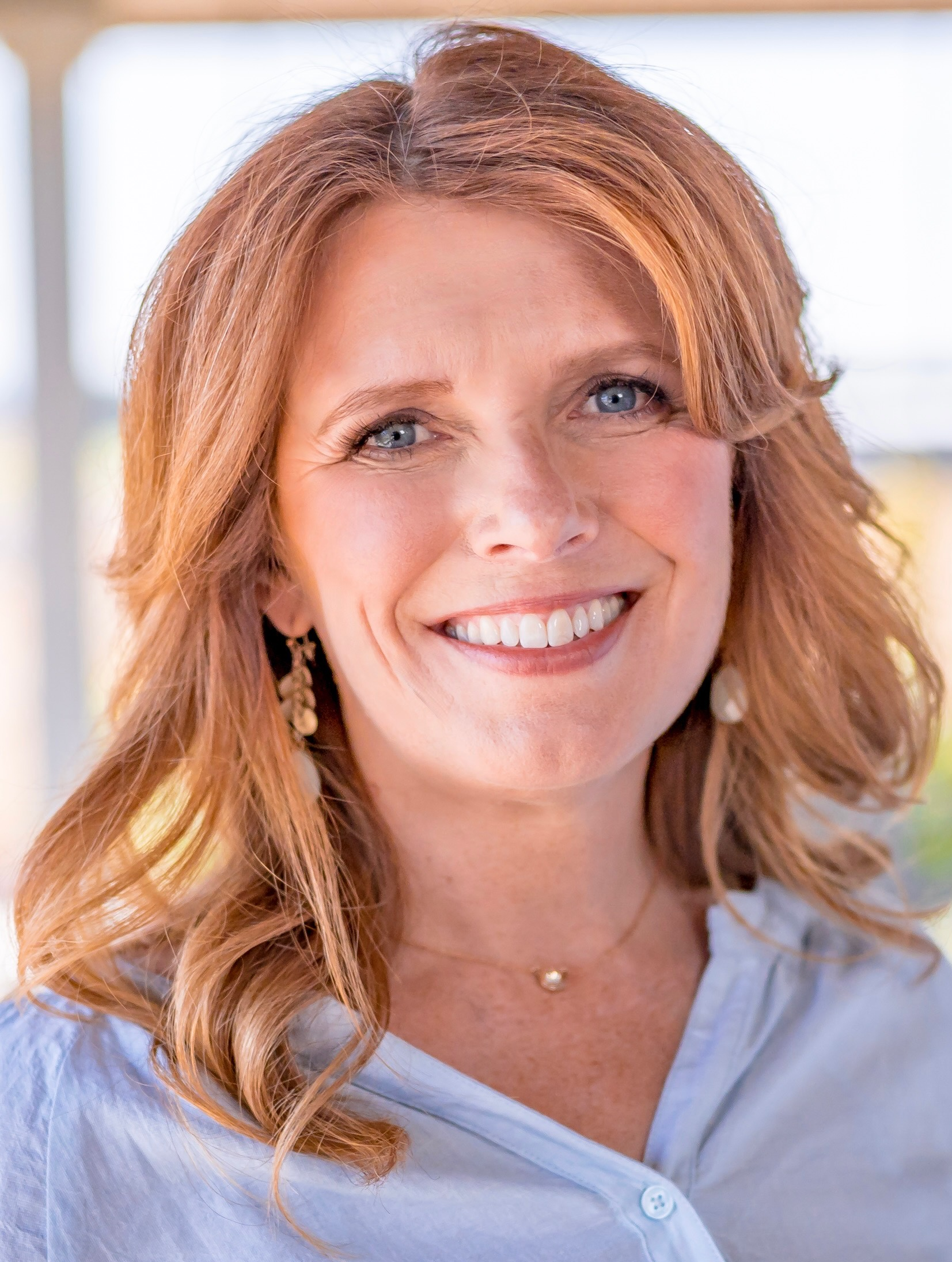
- Drazan in 2022

Member of the Oregon Senate from the 26th district
- Incumbent
- Assumed office October 23, 2025
- Preceded by: Daniel Bonham
- Succeeded by: Jeff Helfrich (elect)

Minority Leader of the Oregon House of Representatives
- In office January 13, 2025 – October 1, 2025
- Preceded by: Jeff Helfrich
- Succeeded by: Lucetta Elmer
- In office September 16, 2019 – November 30, 2021
- Preceded by: Carl Wilson
- Succeeded by: Vikki Breese-Iverson

Member of the Oregon House of Representatives
- In office January 13, 2025 – October 23, 2025
- Preceded by: James Hieb
- Succeeded by: Matt Bunch
- Constituency: 51st district
- In office January 14, 2019 – January 31, 2022
- Preceded by: Bill Kennemer
- Succeeded by: James Hieb
- Constituency: 39th district

Personal details
- Born: Christine Renee Deboy; May 28, 1972 (age 54) Klamath Falls, Oregon, U.S.
- Party: Republican
- Spouse: Daniel Drazan
- Children: 3
- Education: George Fox University (BA)
- Website: State senate website Campaign website
- Drazan's voice Drazan on the 80th Oregon Legislative Assembly. Recorded on August 22, 2019

Christine Renee Drazan (née Deboy, born May 28, 1972) is an American politician who has served in the Oregon State Senate since 2025 in the 26th district as a member of the Republican Party. Prior to her tenure in the state senate she was a member of the Oregon House of Representatives from the 39th and 51st districts. She was minority leader in the state house from 2019 to 2021, and in 2025.

Drazan was born in Klamath Falls, Oregon, and educated at Eagle Point High School and George Fox University. During the 1990s, she worked for Speaker Mark Simmons. She was elected to the state house in 2018 and selected to serve as minority leader. During her tenure as minority leader, she engaged in various parliamentary tactics to thwart legislation supported by the Democratic majority.

Drazan was the Republican nominee in the 2022 Oregon gubernatorial election and in the 2026 Oregon gubernatorial election, but she lost to Democratic nominee Tina Kotek in both elections.

== Early life and education ==
Christine Renee Deboy was born to Perrliee and Dale E. Deboy in Klamath Falls, Oregon. She graduated from Eagle Point High School and George Fox University. She worked as the director of communications for Mark Simmons, the Speaker of the Oregon House of Representatives, in the 1990s. She married Daniel Joseph Drazan in 1997, with whom she has three children.

Drazan is Christian.

== Career ==
=== Oregon Legislative Assembly ===
==== Elections ====
Bill Kennemer, a Republican member of the state house from the 39th district, retired during the 2018 election cycle. Drazan defeated John Lee, Seth Rydmark, and Ken Kraft for the Republican nomination and defeated Democratic nominee Elizabeth Graser-Lindsey in the general election. She defeated Democratic nominee Tessah Danel and Libertarian nominee Kenny Sernach in the 2020 election.

On March 5, 2024, Drazan announced that she would seek the Republican nomination in the 51st district, which became her home district after the 2020 redistricting cycle. Drazan defeated incumbent James Hieb, who replaced her when she resigned from the house in 2020, after raising $169,000 compared to Hieb's $19,000. She ran unopposed in the general election.

Daniel Bonham, the Minority Leader in the Oregon State Senate and member from the 26th district, resigned in 2025 to take a position within President Donald Trump's administration. Bonham endorsed Drazan to be selected as his replacement. 18 commissioners from Clackamas, Multnomah, Wasco, and Hood River assembled to select a replacement on October 23. Drazan, state representative Jeff Helfrich, and chair of the Wasco County Republican Party John Grant competed for the nomination. The commissioners voted 11 to 7 in favor of Jeff Helfrich against Drazan, but Drazan won as all of the commissioners from Clackamas, whose votes were weighted more heavily due to population distribution, supported her.

==== Tenure ====
During Drazan's tenure in the state house she served on the Healthcare committee. Drazan was selected to replace Carl Wilson as the Minority Leader on September 16, 2019, and served until she was replaced by Vikki Breese-Iverson on November 30, 2021. In 2024, she was selected to succeed Jeff Helfrich as Minority Leader.

During Drazan's time as Minority Leader, the Republicans refused to attend legislative meetings in order to deny a quorum so that legislation could not be passed. Drazan participated in these quorum denials and even left the state to further them in the 2020 legislative session. She also forced the verbatim readings of the entirety of legislation on the floor of the House as a delay tactic.

Drazan was appointed to the six-member committee to redraw the districts following the 2020 United States census with equal representation from the Democratic and Republican parties as a compromise created to have the Republicans stop using delaying tactics against legislation. Speaker Tina Kotek later reversed her decision and restored the Democratic majority on the committee redrawing the congressional districts. She made a motion for Kotek to be censured due to this, but it failed with thirty-three representatives voting against and fourteen voting in favor.

=== Gubernatorial campaigns ===
One of Drazan's aides stated on November 23, 2021, that she was going to run for the Republican nomination in the 2022 gubernatorial election. She announced her campaign on January 4, 2022, and resigned from the state house on January 31, where her seat was filled by appointment by Hieb. Trey Rosser was her campaign manager. She won in the Republican primary against eighteen other candidates with 23% of the vote. During 2022 her campaign raised $2,101,788.27 and spent $2,542,604.18. She narrowly lost the election to former Speaker of the Oregon House of Representatives Tina Kotek.

A Republican fundraising platform in August 2025 listed Drazan as a candidate for governor despite her not making an announcement. Four days after being appointed to the state Senate, Drazan announced on October 27, 2025 that she would run for governor in the 2026 election. Drazan lost to Kotek.

== Political positions ==
=== Abortion ===
Drazan states that she is pro-life. She was endorsed by Oregon Right to Life during the 2022 and 2026 elections. She supported the United States Supreme Court overturning Roe v. Wade, in the 2022 Dobbs decision. In 2022, Drazan said she "will be a voice for the sanctity of life". She said, "I will stand up for life by vetoing legislation designed to push Oregon further outside the mainstream." In her 2026 campaign, Drazan said she would not ban abortion in Oregon, and argued that any attempt to do so would require the support of Oregon's legislature.

=== Elections ===
She supports the usage of an independent redistricting commission for redrawing districts. Drazan does not support Donald Trump's false claims of having won the 2020 presidential election and stated that "Donald Trump did not win. Joe Biden did. He is our president".

=== Environment ===
Drazan opposed emissions trading legislation in 2020, and demanded a referendum on the legislation. In 2026, she said she would repeal the Climate Protection Plan.

Drazan received a lifetime score of 20% from the Oregon League of Conservation Voters.

=== Gun rights ===
Drazan voted against the state's law that requires safe gun storage, bans guns from the state capitol and some schools, and requires gun owners to file a report within three days when their firearms go missing. In 2022, she said, "Oregon already has among the strictest gun laws in the nation. We must fully enforce existing laws to ensure that guns are not in the hands of criminals and the public is protected." Drazan said that she would change Oregon's red flag law, and that it lacks due process. She said, "What we need to reduce gun violence across all of our state is to have more law enforcement presence." She opposed 2022 Oregon Ballot Measure 114, and received an "A" rating from the NRA Political Victory Fund.

=== Healthcare ===
She opposed a COVID-19 vaccination mandate.

=== LGBTQ rights ===
In 2025, Drazan supported Oregon House Bill 2037, a bill that would have segregated bathrooms, locker rooms, and sports in K-12 schools and colleges on the basis of sex assignment. She opposes allowing transgender athletes to participate in gender-specific sporting events. Drazan supported Donald Trump's Executive Order 14201. She said, "I want to thank President Trump for taking executive action to protect women's rights and fair competition in women's sports. I urge our state to take similar action to protect women and comply with Title IX."

=== Taxes ===
In her 2026 campaign, Drazan said she would cut taxes and veto any newly proposed taxes.

== Electoral history ==
2018 Oregon House of Representatives 39th district election
Primary election
Party	Candidate	Votes	%
Republican	Christine Drazan	2,640	39.46%
Republican	John Lee	1,901	28.42%
Republican	Seth Rydmark	1,072	16.02%
Republican	Ken Kraft	1,053	15.74%
Write-in		24	0.36%
Total votes		6,690	100.00%
General election
Republican	Christine Drazan	19,732	59.07%
Democratic	Elizabeth Graser-Lindsey	13,611	40.74%
Write-in		63	0.19%
Total votes		33,406	100.00%

2020 Oregon House of Representatives 39th district election
Primary election
Party	Candidate	Votes	%
Republican	Christine Drazan (incumbent)	7,560	99.28%
Write-in		55	0.72%
Total votes		7,615	100.00%
General election
Republican	Christine Drazan (incumbent)	26,202	62.22%
Democratic	Tessah Danel	14,985	35.58%
Libertarian	Kenny Sernach	868	2.06%
Write-in		57	0.14%
Total votes		42,112	100.00%

2022 Oregon gubernatorial Republican primary
Party	Candidate	Votes	%
Republican	Christine Drazan	85,255	22.5%
Republican	Bob Tiernan	66,089	17.5%
Republican	Stan Pulliam	41,123	10.9%
Republican	Bridget Barton	40,886	10.8%
Republican	Bud Pierce	32,965	8.7%
Republican	Marc Thielman	30,076	8.0%
Republican	Kerry McQuisten	28,727	7.6%
Republican	Bill Sizemore	13,261	3.5%
Republican	Jessica Gomez	9,970	2.6%
Republican	Tim McCloud	4,400	1.2%
Republican	Nick Hess	4,287	1.1%
Republican	Court Boice	4,040	1.1%
Republican	Brandon Merritt	3,615	1.0%
Republican	Reed Christensen	3,042	0.8%
Republican	Amber Richardson	1,924	0.5%
Republican	Raymond Baldwin	459	0.1%
Republican	David Burch	406	0.1%
Republican	John Presco	174	0.0%
Republican	Stefan Strek	171	0.0%
Write-in		7,407	2.0%
Total votes		378,277	100.0%

2022 Oregon gubernatorial election
Party	Candidate	Votes	%	±%
Democratic	Tina Kotek	916,635	46.9%	−3.09%
Republican	Christine Drazan	849,853	43.5%	−0.11%
Independent	Betsy Johnson	168,363	8.6%	N/A
Constitution	Donice Noelle Smith	8,047	0.4%	−0.72%
Libertarian	R. Leon Noble	6,862	0.3%	−1.20%
Write-in		2,113	0.1%	-0.05
Total votes		1,951,873	100.0%	

2024 Oregon State Representative 51st district election
Primary election
Party	Candidate	Votes	%
Republican	Christine Drazan	6,142	68.4
Republican	James Hieb (incumbent)	2,824	31.4
Write-in		7	0.1
Total votes		8,973	100.0
General election
Republican	Christine Drazan	27,872	94.1
Write-in		1,737	5.9
Total votes		29,609	100.0

2026 Oregon gubernatorial Republican primary
Party	Candidate	Votes	%
Republican	Christine Drazan	172,474	40.5
Republican	Ed Diehl	140,458	33.0
Republican	Chris Dudley	71,929	16.9
Republican	David Medina	21,742	5.1
Republican	Danielle Bethell	9,629	2.3
Republican	Brad Peters	1,827	0.4
Republican	Paul Romero	1,615	0.4
Republican	Kyle Duyck	1,562	0.4
Republican	Robert Neuman	680	0.2
Republican	Martin Ward	539	0.1
Republican	Hope Dalrymple	534	0.1
Republican	DeAngelo Turner	377	0.1
Republican	Wen Waddell	321	0.1
Republican	Tim Youker	248	0.1
Write-in		1,622	0.4
Total votes		425,557	100.0

2026 Oregon gubernatorial election
Party	Candidate	Votes	%	±%
Democratic	Tina Kotek (incumbent)			
Republican	Christine Drazan			
Pacific Green	Brett Smith			
Write-in				
Total votes			100.0	N/A

Oregon House of Representatives
Preceded by Carl Wilson	Minority Leader of the Oregon House of Representatives; 2019–2021	Succeeded by Vikki Breese-Iverson
Preceded by Jeff Helfrich	Minority Leader of the Oregon House of Representatives; 2025	Succeeded by Lucetta Elmer
Party political offices
Preceded by Knute Buehler	Republican nominee for Governor of Oregon; 2022, 2026	Most recent
