= Brent Barton =

American politician (born 1980)

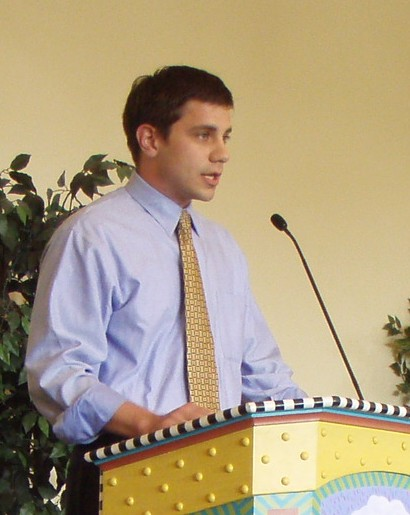
- Barton in 2009

Member of the Oregon House of Representatives from the 40th district
- In office January 14, 2013 – January 9, 2017
- Preceded by: Dave Hunt
- Succeeded by: Mark Meek

Member of the Oregon House of Representatives from the 51st district
- In office January 12, 2009 – January 10, 2011
- Preceded by: Linda Flores
- Succeeded by: Patrick Sheehan

Personal details
- Born: March 11, 1980 (age 46)
- Party: Democratic
- Education: Stanford University; University of Cambridge; Harvard Law School
- Profession: Attorney

Brent Barton (born March 11, 1980) is a Democratic politician from the US state of Oregon. He was elected in 2008 to the Oregon House of Representatives, representing District 51, which encompasses parts of Clackamas County and Multnomah County, and includes all or part of the cities of Boring, Clackamas, Damascus, Estacada, and Oregon City. In the 2010 election, Barton ran unsuccessfully for the Oregon State Senate, declining to run for reelection to his House seat. In 2012, he ran again for the House, this time defeating Republican Steve Newgard with 51% of the vote. He retired in 2016, and was succeeded by Mark Meek.

== Early life and career ==
Barton grew up in Oregon and attended Stanford University, where he earned a bachelor's degree in political science, and a master's degree in sociology in 2002 at Queens' College, Cambridge. His father, William A. Barton, has been considered one of the best lawyers in America in several areas of law, and is known for representing a plaintiff in a high-profile case against the Roman Catholic Archdiocese of Portland.

While at Stanford, Brent served as an aide for Oregon Congresswoman Darlene Hooley. He was also a White House intern in 2000 between his sophomore and junior years. Barton went on to earn a JD from Harvard Law School, then returned to Oregon where he worked as a criminal prosecutor, volunteered as a high school teacher, and served on the board of directors of the Oregon Bus Project. In 2007, he was hired to the litigation department of the Portland office of the Perkins Coie law firm. Brent left Perkins Coie and joined Barton Trial Attourneys in 2010, and made partner in the firm in 2016.

== Political career ==
In 2008, Barton was unopposed for the Democratic nomination for House District 51 and faced incumbent Linda Flores in the general election. During the campaign Flores accused him of exaggeration regarding his time as criminal prosecutor while at Harvard Law. Barton defeated Flores 52% to 48% in the November general election to win the seat.

In the 2009 session, Barton served on the Judiciary and Consumer Protection committees, and as Vice-Chair of the Business and Labor Committee.

In 2010, Barton ran for the Oregon State Senate seat in District 26 vacated by retiring Senator Rick Metsger, but lost to Republican candidate Chuck Thomsen 47% to 53%.

Barton ran for a House seat again in 2012; he was again unopposed for the Democratic nomination for House District 40, and defeated Republican Steve Newgard in the general election.

== Electoral history ==
2008 Oregon State Representative, 51st district
Party	Candidate	Votes	%
Democratic	Brent Barton	14,033	51.7
Republican	Linda Flores	13,057	48.1
Write-in		65	0.2
Total votes		27,155	100%

2010 Oregon State Senator, 26th district
Party	Candidate	Votes	%
Republican	Chuck Thomsen	24,925	52.9
Democratic	Brent Barton	22,144	47.0
Write-in		70	0.1
Total votes		47,139	100%

2012 Oregon State Representative, 40th district
Party	Candidate	Votes	%
Democratic	Brent Barton	14,083	50.5
Republican	Steve Newgard	13,735	49.3
Write-in		66	0.2
Total votes		27,884	100%

2014 Oregon State Representative, 40th district
Party	Candidate	Votes	%
Democratic	Brent Barton	12,994	53.7
Republican	Steve Newgard	11,059	45.7
Write-in		126	0.5
Total votes		24,179	100%
