= Dave Hunt (Oregon politician) =

American politician (born 1967)

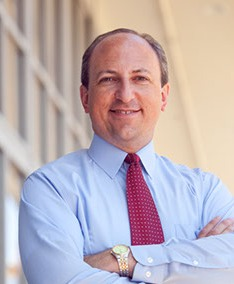

Majority Leader of the Oregon House of Representatives
- In office January 10, 2011 – June 30, 2011 Serving with Kevin Cameron
- Preceded by: Mary Nolan
- Succeeded by: Tina Kotek
- In office January 2007 – January 2009
- Preceded by: Jeff Merkley
- Succeeded by: Mary Nolan

65th Speaker of the Oregon House of Representatives
- In office January 12, 2009 – January 10, 2011
- Preceded by: Jeff Merkley
- Succeeded by: Bruce Hanna; Arnie Roblan

Member of the Oregon House of Representatives from the 40th district
- In office January 2003 – January 2013
- Preceded by: Phil Barnhart
- Succeeded by: Brent Barton

Personal details
- Born: November 10, 1967 (age 58) Port Angeles, Washington, U.S.
- Party: Democratic
- Education: Columbia University (BA)

Dave Hunt (born November 10, 1967) is an American politician in the state of Oregon. A Democrat, he was the Oregon House Speaker and served as State Representative for District 40 of the Oregon House of Representatives representing Clackamas County from 2003 to 2013. He was elected House Majority Leader for the 2007–2009 session, succeeding Minority Leader Jeff Merkley, who was chosen as Speaker. Hunt served as Speaker during the 2009–2011 session, again succeeding Merkley, who was elected to serve in the United States Senate. After his service in the House, Hunt served as president and CEO of the Pacific Northwest Defense Coalition (PNDC) for five years. He currently serves as executive director of the National Alliance on Mental Illness (NAMI) Clackamas.

== Early years ==
Dave Hunt was born in Port Angeles, Washington to Karin and Harley Hunt on November 10, 1967. He attended Sheldon High School in Eugene, Oregon and New York City's Columbia University where he majored in political science.

Following college he worked for 10 years as a staff member for three members of Congress: Louise Slaughter, Brian Baird, and Darlene Hooley.

By profession, Hunt served from 2001 to 2013 as executive director of the Columbia River Channel Coalition and the Association of Pacific Ports. In 2013, he was named president and CEO of the Pacific Northwest Defense Coalition, an association of defense and security businesses across the Northwest. He served as president and CEO of Columbia Public Affairs. He currently serves as executive director of the National Alliance on Mental Illness (NAMI) Clackamas.

Hunt has two children: Andrew (born in 1995) and Emily (born in 1999).

== Political career ==
In 1999, Hunt was elected to the Oregon City School Board, and served there until 2003. He also served a two-year term (2002–03) as the youngest-ever National President of American Baptist Churches USA. He previously served on the Clackamas County Committee for Citizen Involvement.

In 2002, Hunt was elected to the Oregon House of Representatives to represent northern Clackamas County, which includes Gladstone, Oak Grove, Jennings Lodge, Johnson City, and North Clackamas.

In November 2008, Hunt was re-elected to a fourth term in the Oregon House and was subsequently elected to the position of Speaker of the Oregon House for the 2009–2011 legislative session. In November 2010, Hunt was re-elected to a fifth term in the Oregon House and was subsequently elected as House Democratic Leader.

Hunt chaired the House Transportation and Economic Development Committee, as well as the House Rules Committee. He also served on the House Transportation Committee, Veterans Affairs Committee, Agriculture and Natural Resources Committee, Trade and Economic Development Committee, Head Start Committee, Campaign Finance Reform Committee, and Elections, Ethics and Rules Committee. He was listed as a 2011 "Top Dog" by the Oregon Humane Society.

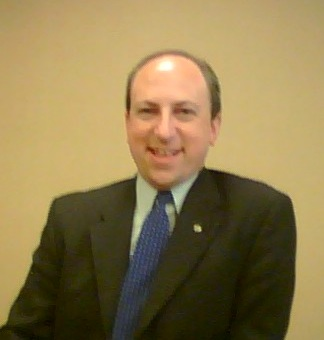
Hunt in 2008

=== Jobs ===
He increased loans and grants for small businesses needing capital, invested in emerging industries, broadened research and development tax credits, streamlined regulations, expanded industrial lands, increased sustainable timber harvesting in state forests, and authored the law creating "Oregon Business Xpress”, promoted as a "a one-stop shop for businesses".

=== Education ===
Passed major expansion of Head Start and Relief Nurseries, increased funding for career/technical education programs and facilities in high schools and community colleges, reformed the "double majority" election requirement to improve school facilities, amended the Oregon Constitution to allow state K-12 capital funding, authorized construction excise fees so new housing developments help fund school facilities, passed record investments in community college facilities on all 17 Oregon campuses, increased college financial aid by 72%, and allowed greater flexibility for Oregon universities.

=== Transportation ===
Passed the 2009 Jobs and Transportation Act, funded the long-awaited Sunrise Highway Corridor in Clackamas County and the Highway 213 Jughandle project in Oregon City, created ConnectOregon to improve air, rail, and marine infrastructure, required the removal of unsafe school buses, and re-opened the Government Camp Rest Area on Highway 26.

=== Health care ===
Enacted Healthy Kids Act in 2009 to provide health insurance to 90,000 uninsured children and 30,000 low-income adults, a prescription drug bulk purchasing pool for seniors, the Oregon Health Insurance Exchange to reduce costs for small businesses and consumers, mental health parity to ensure mental health care is covered by insurance companies, and a law strengthening organ donor rights.

=== Public Safety ===
Restored 24/7 Oregon State Police highway coverage after 15 years of drastic cuts, successfully cracked down on methamphetamines and metal theft, authored two new laws to prevent drunk driving by requiring offenders to install ignition interlock devices, protected child abuse funding, changed the domestic violence funding formula so local services get a fairer share, eliminated spiritual beliefs as a defense for refusing health treatment for children, and began to shift greater resources to crime prevention.

=== Environment ===
Helped businesses and homes become energy efficient, passed Ballot Measure 49 to bring greater balance to land use laws, modernized Oregon’s Bottle Bill, enacted new renewable energy and low carbon fuel standards to improve air quality, invested in wave energy, and increased protections for Oregon fish and sportfishermen by cracking down on California sea lions.

=== Veteran affairs ===
Hunt served on the Oregon Veterans Committee, funded new Veterans Service Officers across Oregon to expand access to local services, passed a renter’s tax credit for low-income veterans and returning soldiers and a property tax exemption for disabled vets, expanded educational opportunities for vets, created a second Oregon Veterans Home in Lebanon, OR, created an emergency fund for military families, and enabled service members to more easily vote in elections even when stationed in a war zone.

=== Human services ===
Expanded farmer’s market vouchers for low-income families and seniors, provided more school breakfasts and lunches, more summer meals for hungry kids, and Oregon Project Independence for seniors at home.

=== Civil rights ===
Passed anti-discrimination law to protect LGBT Oregonians and domestic partnerships. Authored the Oregon Workplace Religious Freedom Act to allow greater religious freedom in Oregon workplaces and repealed a 1923 KKK-inspired law that disallowed teachers from wearing religious garb in the classroom.

=== Fiscal responsibility ===
Created Oregon’s first "Rainy Day Fund”, which aims to protect services during recessions, and required new pro-active reviews of tax breaks each biennium. Reformed campaign finance laws to increase transparency, ethics laws, and the "double majority" election requirement to enable local voters to fairly pass local measures.

=== Legislative reform ===
Reduced the size of the legislative budget and the length of legislative sessions, while increasing productivity and public access. Created regular legislative committee days to streamline committee operations during legislative interim periods. Oversaw implementation of the first permanent annual legislative session.

Hunt chose to not run for re-election to the House in 2012 and was replaced by fellow Democrat Brent Barton.

== Post-legislative career ==
After his service in the House, Hunt served as president and CEO of the Pacific Northwest Defense Coalition (PNDC) for five years and then as Senior Vice President of Strategies 360 for three years.

In 2015, Hunt was elected to the board of Clackamas Community College, and was re-elected in 2017. On May 3, 2021, Hunt was cited by Portland Police in an undercover solicitation sting and took leave from the board. On March 17, 2022, a Multnomah County judge dismissed the charge against Hunt and the case was closed. Hunt was re-elected to the CCC board on May 18, 2021. Hunt was elected to the national board of the Association of Welcoming and Affirming Baptists in 2019 and was elected board treasurer in 2021.

Hunt served as president and CEO of Columbia Public Affairs.

Hunt currently serves as the executive director of the National Alliance on Mental Illness (NAMI) Clackamas.

== Electoral history ==
2004 Oregon State Representative, 40th district
Party	Candidate	Votes	%
Democratic	Dave Hunt	15,832	59.3
Republican	David Sanders	10,797	40.4
Write-in		78	0.3
Total votes		26,707	100%

2006 Oregon State Representative, 40th district
Party	Candidate	Votes	%
Democratic	Dave Hunt	13,606	97.0
Write-in		418	3.0
Total votes		14,024	100%

2008 Oregon State Representative, 40th district
Party	Candidate	Votes	%
Democratic	Dave Hunt	17,239	96.7
Write-in		595	3.3
Total votes		17,834	100%

2010 Oregon State Representative, 40th district
Party	Candidate	Votes	%
Democratic	Dave Hunt	12,500	60.5
Republican	Deborah J Gerritzen	8,135	39.3
Write-in		39	0.2
Total votes		20,674	100%
