= Oregon's 40th House district =

Legislative districts in the state of Oregon

Oregon's 40th House district after redistricting after the 2020 Census

District 40 of the Oregon House of Representatives is one of 60 House legislative districts in the state of Oregon. As of 2021, the district is located entirely within Clackamas County and contains Gladstone, Jennings Lodge, Johnson City, Oatfield, and Oregon City as well as parts of Clackamas. The current representative for the district is Democrat Annessa Hartman of Gladstone.

== Election results ==
District boundaries have changed over time. Therefore, representatives before 2021 may not represent the same constituency as today. General election results from 2000 to present are as follows:

| Year | Candidate | Party | Percent | Opponent | Party | Percent | Opponent | Party | Percent | Opponent | Party | Percent | Write-in percentage |
|---|---|---|---|---|---|---|---|---|---|---|---|---|---|
| 2000 | Phil Barnhart | Democratic | 71.83% | Bill Young | Republican | 23.51% | Karl Sorg | Socialist | 4.66% | No fourth candidate | | | |
| 2002 | Dave Hunt | Democratic | 53.64% | Dick Jones | Republican | 46.35% | No third candidate | | | No fourth candidate | | | 0.01% |
| 2004 | Dave Hunt | Democratic | 59.45% | David Sanders | Republican | 40.55% | No third candidate | | | No fourth candidate | | | |
| 2006 | Dave Hunt | Democratic | 97.02% | Unopposed | | | | | | | | | 2.98% |
| 2008 | Dave Hunt | Democratic | 96.66% | Unopposed | | | | | | | | | 3.34% |
| 2010 | Dave Hunt | Democratic | 60.44% | Deborah Gerritzen | Republican | 39.37% | No third candidate | | | No fourth candidate | | | 0.19% |
| 2012 | Brent Barton | Democratic | 50.51% | Steve Newgard | Republican | 49.26% | No third candidate | | | No fourth candidate | | | 0.24% |
| 2014 | Brent Barton | Democratic | 53.74% | Steve Newgard | Republican | 45.74% | No third candidate | | | No fourth candidate | | | 0.52% |
| 2016 | Mark Meek | Democratic | 51.03% | Evon Tekorius | Republican | 43.34% | Christine VanOrder | Independent | 2.71% | Jeffrey Langan | Libertarian | 2.66% | 0.26% |
| 2018 | Mark Meek | Democratic | 47.44% | Josh Hill | Republican | 44.15% | No third candidate | | | No fourth candidate | | | 0.23% |
| 2020 | Mark Meek | Democratic | 54.60% | Josh Howard | Republican | 45.23% | No third candidate | | | No fourth candidate | | | 0.16% |
| 2022 | Annessa Hartman | Democratic | 50.22% | Adam Baker | Republican | 49.67% | No third candidate | | | No fourth candidate | | | 0.1% |
| 2024 | Annessa Hartman | Democratic | 55.8% | Michael Steven Newgard | Republican | 44.0% | No third candidate | | | No fourth candidate | | | 0.2% |

== See also ==
- Oregon Legislative Assembly
- Oregon House of Representatives
