= Oregon's 26th Senate district =

American legislative district

Oregon's 26th Senate District as of September 27, 2021

District 26 of the Oregon State Senate comprises all of Hood River County, as well as parts of Clackamas, Multnomah, and Wasco counties. The district is composed of Oregon House districts 51 and 52. It is currently represented by Republican Christine Drazan of Canby.

== Election results ==
District boundaries have changed over time, and senators prior to 2013 may not represent the same constituency as today. From 1993 until 2003, the district covered parts of Southern Oregon; from 2003 until 2013, it shifted to cover all of Hood River County and eastern portions of Clackamas and Multnomah counties, including a panhandle in Clackamas; and from 2013 until 2023, it shifted east, losing most of southeastern Clackamas County and its previous panhandle but gaining a panhandle covering Happy Valley and outer southeast Portland surrounding Powell Butte.

The current district is similar to its previous iterations. The district no longer includes any part of Portland, Clackamas, or Happy Valley and uses the Clackamas River as its northern boundary in Clackamas County. It has added the communities of Beavercreek, Canby, and Estacada in Clackamas County and Chenoweth, Mosier, and The Dalles in Wasco County.

The results are as follows:

Year	Candidate	Party	Percent	Opponent	Party	Percent	Opponent	Party	Percent
1982	Lenn Hannon	Republican	54.5%	Jay Carlton Mullen	Democratic	45.5%	No third candidate		
1986	Lenn Hannon	Republican	54.8%	Sue C. Kupillas	Democratic	45.2%	No third candidate		
1990	Lenn Hannon	Republican	51.9%	Jeff Golden	Democratic	48.1%	No third candidate		
1994	Lenn Hannon	Republican	72.0%	Jeff Golden	Democratic	22.6%	George T. Fuller	Nonpartisan	5.4%
1998	Lenn Hannon	Republican	100.0%	Unopposed					
2002	Rick Metsger	Democratic	54.2%	Bob Montgomery	Republican	45.7%	No third candidate		
2006	Rick Metsger	Democratic	56.9%	Carol York	Republican	42.9%	No third candidate		
2010	Chuck Thomsen	Republican	53.0%	Brent Barton	Democratic	47.0%	No third candidate		
2014	Chuck Thomsen	Republican	56.6%	Robert R. Bruce	Democratic	43.0%	No third candidate		
2018	Chuck Thomsen	Republican	50.1%	Chrissy Reitz	Democratic	49.8%	No third candidate		
2022	Daniel Bonham	Republican	59.1%	Raz Mason	Democratic	40.8%	No third candidate		
