= Senator Schrader =

Senator Schrader may refer to:

- Kurt Schrader (born 1951), Oregon State Senate
- Martha Schrader (born 1953), Oregon State Senate
