= Bill Kennemer =

American politician (born 1946)

Member of the Oregon Senate from the 20th district
- In office February 1, 2021 – January 9, 2023
- Preceded by: Alan Olsen
- Succeeded by: Mark Meek

Member of the Oregon House of Representatives from the 39th district
- In office January 12, 2009 – January 14, 2019
- Preceded by: Wayne Scott
- Succeeded by: Christine Drazan

Member of the Oregon Senate from the 12th district
- In office January 12, 1987 – January 13, 1997
- Preceded by: Walt Brown
- Succeeded by: Verne Duncan

Personal details
- Born: 1946 (age 79–80) Sacramento, California, U.S.
- Party: Republican
- Spouse: Cherie
- Education: Warner Pacific University (BA); Fuller Theological Seminary (MS, PhD)

Bill Kennemer (born 1946) is an American clinical psychologist and Republican politician who represented the 20th district in the Oregon State Senate from 2021 to 2023. Kennemer previously represented Oregon's 39th House district in the Oregon House of Representatives from 2009 to 2019, and Oregon's 12th Senate district from 1987 to 1997.

== Early life and education ==
Kennemer was born in Sacramento, California. He received a Bachelor of Arts degree from Warner Pacific College in 1968 and a PhD from Fuller Graduate School of Psychology in 1975.

== Career ==
Kennemer was a clinical psychologist in private practice for nearly 25 years as well as a professor of psychology. He has also worked as a truck driver and farm hand.

=== Political career ===
Kennemer cites his commitment to public service as stemming from an incident in 1952 when, after his family home was destroyed by a fire, the community came together to rebuild it. He was an Oregon State Senator from 1987 to 1996, where he served as Assistant Senate Minority Leader, and Chair of the Senate Business, Housing and Finance Committee. He was in the BiPartisan Tourism Caucus, and the Fish and Wildlife Caucus, and was a member of the Association of Oregon Counties Legislative Committee. He was also a member of the Education Commission of the States and the Clackamas County Economic Development Commission.

Upon leaving the Senate, he served as a Clackamas County Commissioner from 1997 to 2008, five times as chair.

In 2008, he narrowly won the closest legislative race in Oregon against first-time candidate Democrat Toby Forsberg for the Oregon House of Representatives seat held by former Minority Leader Wayne Scott. He won four more two-year terms before opting not to seek re-election in 2018.

In 2021, Kennemer was appointed to complete the Senate term of Alan Olsen, who resigned with two years remaining in his term.

=== Awards ===
As Clackamas County Commissioner in, he received the Association of Oregon Counties Board of Directors' Outstanding Service Award for 1998. Later, while a state representative, his support and advocacy in animal-related measures saw him labeled as a 2011 "Top Dog" by the Oregon Humane Society.

== Memberships and committees ==
- Oregon Trail Foundation, Founding Member
- Providence Milwaukie Hospital Foundation Board
- North Clackamas Chamber Board of Directors
- Warner Pacific College Board of Trustees

== Personal life ==
Having lost his previous wife to cancer, Kennemer is now married to Cherie McGinnis. They share four children and nine grandchildren.

== Electoral history ==
2008 Oregon State Representative, 39th district
Party	Candidate	Votes	%
Republican	Bill Kennemer	14,408	50.7
Democratic	Toby Forsberg	13,921	49.0
Write-in		80	0.3
Total votes		28,409	100%

2010 Oregon State Representative, 39th district
Party	Candidate	Votes	%
Republican	Bill Kennemer	14,284	58.0
Democratic	Alice Norris	10,284	41.8
Write-in		63	0.3
Total votes		24,631	100%

2012 Oregon State Representative, 39th district
Party	Candidate	Votes	%
Republican	Bill Kennemer	18,748	61.3
Democratic	Christopher Cameron Bangs	11,045	36.1
Libertarian	Blake Holmes	763	2.5
Write-in		33	0.1
Total votes		30,589	100%

2014 Oregon State Representative, 39th district
Party	Candidate	Votes	%
Republican	Bill Kennemer	20,041	96.7
Write-in		689	3.3
Total votes		20,730	100%

2016 Oregon State Representative, 39th district
Party	Candidate	Votes	%
Republican	Bill Kennemer	22,160	64.8
Democratic	Charles Gallia	10,963	32.1
Libertarian	Kenny Sernach	1,009	3.0
Write-in		53	0.2
Total votes		34,185	100%

=== 2022 ===
2022 Oregon Senate 20th district Republican primary
Party	Candidate	Votes	%
Republican	Bill Kennemer (incumbent)	8,069	85.06
Republican	Christopher J. Morrisette	847	8.93
Republican	Tim M. Large	502	5.29
Republican	Write-in	68	0.72
Total votes		9,486	100.0

2022 Oregon Senate 20th district election
Party	Candidate	Votes	%
Democratic	Mark Meek	31,317	50.33
Republican	Bill Kennemer (incumbent)	30,814	49.52
Write-in		94	0.15
Total votes		62,225	100.0
