= Chuck Thomsen =

American politician

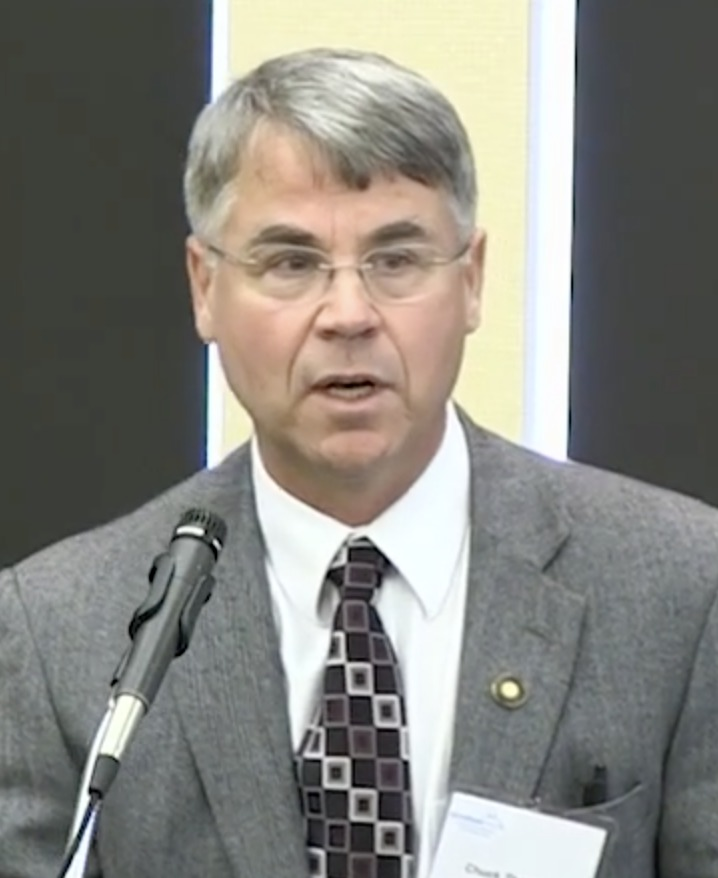
- Thomsen in 2013

Member of the Oregon Senate from the 26th district
- In office January 11, 2011 – January 9, 2023
- Preceded by: Rick Metsger
- Succeeded by: Daniel Bonham

Personal details
- Born: January 20, 1957 (age 69) Hood River, Oregon
- Party: Republican
- Spouse: Kristi
- Profession: Orchardist
- Chuck Thomsen's voice Thomsen speaking about the then-upcoming 77th Oregon Legislative Assembly; Recorded April 21, 2013

Charles William Thomsen (born January 20, 1957) is an American politician. From 2011 to 2023, he served as a Republican in the Oregon Senate representing District 26, which includes all of Hood River County and parts of eastern Multnomah County and northeastern Clackamas County.

== Early life and career ==
Thomsen was born on January 20, 1957, in Hood River, Oregon, and graduated from Hood River Valley High School, then attended Willamette University, where he graduated with a bachelor's degree in political science and economics. Thomsen returned to Hood River where he worked as an orchardist, raising pears and apples.

== Political career ==
Thomsen was appointed to the Hood River Planning Commission in 1990, and then elected to the Hood River County Board of Commissioners in 1994. He was re-elected to the commission four times and served until 2010. In 2010, Thomsen ran for the Oregon State Senate seat held by Rick Metsger, who vacated the seat to run for Oregon State Treasurer. In the 2010 general election, Thomsen defeated Democrat Brent Barton 53%–47%. His support and advocacy in animal-related measures saw him labeled as a 2011 "Top Dog" by the Oregon Humane Society.

On December 11, 2020, Thomsen and 11 other state Republican officials signed a letter requesting Oregon Attorney General Ellen Rosenblum join Texas and other states contesting the results of the 2020 presidential election in Texas v. Pennsylvania. Rosenblum announced she had filed in behalf of the defense, and against Texas, the day prior.

== Recall effort ==
From June 20, 2019, all eleven Republican state senators for Oregon, including Thomsen, refused to show up for work at the Oregon State Capitol, instead going into hiding, some even fleeing the state. Their aim was to prevent a vote on a cap-and-trade proposal that would dramatically lower greenhouse gas emissions by 2050 to combat climate change. The Senate holds 30 seats, but 1 is vacant due to a death. Without the Republican senators, the remaining 18 Democratic state senators could not reach a quorum of 20 to hold a vote.

The walk-out led to one of Thomsen's Hood River constituents, Lara Dunn, to file a petition for a recall of his seat on March 5, 2020. “Senator Chuck Thomsen broke his promise to represent us in the Legislature,” Dunn wrote in a prospective petition. “He stopped going to work but still collected his taxpayer-funded salary and daily stipend. He must be recalled and replaced by someone who will show up and fight for our jobs, our schools, our healthcare and our future.” Thomsen's opponents pointed to comments Thomsen had made to Oregon Public Radio regarding his plans to head for warm weather if a walkout occurred, and that he'd packed polo shirts and shorts.

In order to force a recall election, Dunn's petition effort needed to gather 9,025 valid signatures by June 2, according to the Secretary of State's Office. The recall effort failed.

== Personal life ==
Thomsen owns Thomsen Orchards in Hood River, where he lives with his wife, Kristi. The couple has two grown daughters.

== Electoral history ==
2010 Oregon State Senator, 26th district
| Party | Candidate | Votes | % |
|---|---|---|---|
| Republican | Chuck Thomsen | 24,925 | 52.9 |
| Democratic | Brent Barton | 22,144 | 47.0 |
| Write-in | | 70 | 0.1 |
| Total votes | | 47,139 | 100% |

2014 Oregon State Senator, 26th district
| Party | Candidate | Votes | % |
|---|---|---|---|
| Republican | Chuck Thomsen | 24,422 | 56.5 |
| Democratic | Robert R Bruce | 18,641 | 43.1 |
| Write-in | | 183 | 0.4 |
| Total votes | | 43,246 | 100% |

2018 Oregon State Senator, 26th district
| Party | Candidate | Votes | % |
|---|---|---|---|
| Republican | Chuck Thomsen | 29,472 | 50.1 |
| Democratic | Chrissy Reitz | 29,263 | 49.8 |
| Write-in | | 79 | 0.1 |
| Total votes | | 58,814 | 100% |
