= Harley Hunt =

American Baptist pastor, politician, and denominational leader

- Born: Harley Don Hunt; February 19, 1940; Boise, Idaho
- Died: October 2004 (aged 64); Tacoma, Washington
- Education: Linfield University; American Baptist Seminary of the West
- Children: 2, including Dave

Harley Don Hunt (February 1940 – October 2004) was an American Baptist pastor, politician, and denominational leader.

== Early life and education ==
Harley Hunt was born on February 19, 1940, in Boise, Idaho to Don and Wynnie Hunt. He graduated from Stadium High School in Tacoma, Washington, Linfield University in McMinnville, Oregon, and American Baptist Seminary of the West in Berkeley, California.

== Career ==
Hunt served as associate pastor of First Baptist Church of Port Angeles, Washington (1966–1968) and as senior pastor of Gregory Heights Baptist (now Burien Community) Church in Seattle, Washington (1968–1974), Clearfield Community Church in Clearfield, Utah (1974–1983), Emerald Baptist Church in Eugene, Oregon (1983–1985), and Grace Baptist Church in Tacoma, Washington (1994–2004).

Harley Hunt was executive director of the Ministers Council of American Baptist Churches USA from 1985 to 1993, based in Valley Forge, Pennsylvania. In that role, he provided national leadership in advocacy, support, resources, continuing education, and fellowship opportunities for American Baptist professional leaders. Previously, he served on the General Board of American Baptist Churches (ABC), the Board of Educational Ministries, the Board of Managers of The Ministers and Missionaries Benefit Board, the regional ABC boards the Northwestern United States and Oregon, and the board of Linfield College.

While in Utah, he served a term on the Clearfield City Council. He was the author of "The Stained Glass Fishbowl: Strengthening Clergy Marriages" published in 1990.

== Personal life ==
Harley Hunt was married to Karin Victoria (née Poggi) Hunt from 1964 until his death. They had two children: Dave Hunt (born in 1967) and Tim Hunt (born in 1969) and three grandchildren. His son Dave served as national president of American Baptist Churches USA and as Speaker of the Oregon House of Representatives.

Harley Hunt died in Tacoma, Washington in October 2004 after a long illness.
