= Oregon's 39th House district =

Legislative districts in the state of Oregon

Oregon's 39th House district after redistricting after the 2020 Census

District 39 of the Oregon House of Representatives is one of 60 House legislative districts in the state of Oregon. As of 2021, the district is located almost entirely within Clackamas County with a very small sliver of Multnomah County and includes Clackamas and Happy Valley with a small sliver of outer southeastern Portland. The current representative for the district is Democrat April Dobson.

== Election results ==
District boundaries have changed over time. Therefore, representatives before 2021 may not represent the same constituency as today. General election results from 2000 to present are as follows:

Year	Candidate	Party	Percent	Opponent	Party	Percent	Opponent	Party	Percent	Write-in percentage
2000	Robert Ackerman	Democratic	58.57%	Christopher Bevans	Republican	41.43%	No third candidate			
2002	Wayne Scott	Republican	51.50%	Martha Schrader	Democratic	48.48%	No third candidate			0.03%
2004	Wayne Scott	Republican	56.85%	Doug Neeley	Democratic	40.37%	Wes Wagner	Libertarian	2.79%	
2006	Wayne Scott	Republican	54.84%	Mike Caudle	Democratic	41.25%	Wes Wagner	Libertarian	3.67%	0.23%
2008	Bill Kennemer	Republican	50.72%	Toby Forsberg	Democratic	49.00%	No third candidate			0.28%
2010	Bill Kennemer	Republican	57.94%	Alice Norris	Democratic	41.80%	No third candidate			0.26%
2012	Bill Kennemer	Republican	61.29%	Christopher Cameron Bangs	Democratic	36.11%	Blake Holmes	Libertarian	2.49%	0.11%
2014	Bill Kennemer	Republican	96.68%	Unopposed						3.32%
2016	Bill Kennemer	Republican	64.82%	Charles Gallia	Democratic	32.07%	Kenny Sernach	Libertarian	2.95%	0.16%
2018	Christine Drazan	Republican	59.07%	Elizabeth Graser-Lindsey	Democratic	40.74%	No third candidate			0.19%
2020	Christine Drazan	Republican	62.22%	Tessah Danel	Democratic	35.58%	Kenny Sernach	Libertarian	2.06%	0.14%
2022	Janelle Bynum (Note: Janelle Bynum was the incumbent in this election. She previously represented District 51, but was moved to this district due to redistricting following the 2020 United States Census.)	Democratic	54.96%	Kori Haynes	Republican	44.87%	No third candidate			0.17%
2024	April Dobson	Democratic	54.43%	Aimee Reiner	Republican	45.34%	No third candidate			0.23%

== See also ==
- Oregon Legislative Assembly
- Oregon House of Representatives
