= Oregon's 51st House district =

Legislative districts in the state of Oregon

Oregon's 51st House district after redistricting after the 2020 Census

District 51 of the Oregon House of Representatives is one of 60 House legislative districts in the state of Oregon. As of 2021, the district is located entirely within Clackamas County and includes Beavercreek, Canby, Eagle Creek, Estacada, and Sandy. The district was most recently represented by Republican Christine Drazan of Canby.

== Election results ==
District boundaries have changed over time. Therefore, representatives before 2021 may not represent the same constituency as today. General election results from 2000 to present are as follows:

Year	Candidate	Party	Percent	Opponent	Party	Percent	Write-in percentage
2000	Cherryl Walker	Republican	66.31%	Lon Holston	Democratic	33.69%	
2002 (Note: Jan Lee was the incumbent in this election. She previously represented District 10, but was moved to this district due to redistricting following the 2000 United States census.)	Linda Flores	Republican	57.91%	Jan Lee	Democratic	42.02%	0.07%
2004	Linda Flores	Republican	53.32%	Kathryn Firestone	Democratic	46.68%	
2006	Linda Flores	Republican	57.58%	Ryan Olds	Democratic	42.28%	0.15%
2008	Brent Barton	Democratic	51.68%	Linda Flores	Republican	48.08%	0.24%
2010	Patrick Sheehan	Republican	54.58%	Cheryl Myers	Democratic	45.25%	0.18%
2012	Shemia Fagan	Democratic	52.77%	Patrick Sheehan	Republican	46.96%	0.28%
2014	Shemia Fagan	Democratic	52.42%	Jodi Bailey	Republican	47.10%	0.48%
2016	Janelle Bynum	Democratic	50.85%	Lori Chavez-DeRemer	Republican	48.85%	0.31%
2018	Janelle Bynum	Democratic	53.92%	Lori Chavez-DeRemer	Republican	45.85%	0.23%
2020	Janelle Bynum	Democratic	52.83%	Jane Hays	Republican	43.15%	0.13%
2022	James Hieb (Note: James Hieb was the incumbent in this election. He previously represented District 39 after being appointed to the spot after Christine Drazan resigned to run for governor. He was moved to this district due to redistricting following the 2020 United States census.)	Republican	66.02%	Walt Trandum	Democratic	33.66%	0.32%
2024	Christine Drazan (Note: Christine Drazen beat the incumbent in the May primary. Drazan was the House District 39 Representative from 2019 to 2022 before she resigned to run for Governor.)	Republican	94.1%	Unopposed			5.9%

== See also ==
- Oregon Legislative Assembly
- Oregon House of Representatives
