= Mark Meek =

American politician

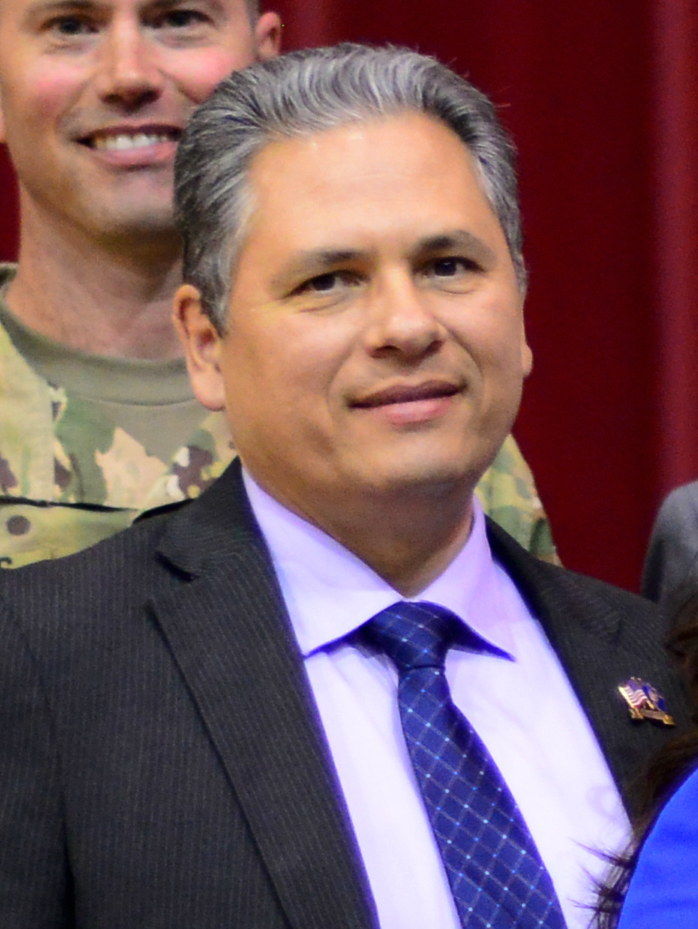

Member of the Oregon Senate from the 20th district
- Incumbent
- Assumed office January 9, 2023
- Preceded by: Bill Kennemer

Member of the Oregon House of Representatives from the 40th district
- In office January 9, 2017 – January 9, 2023
- Preceded by: Brent Barton
- Succeeded by: Annessa Hartman

Personal details
- Party: Democratic
- Education: Park University

Military service
- Branch/service: United States Air Force

Mark Meek is an American politician and real estate agent serving as a member of the Oregon State Senate from the 20th district, which covers parts of Clackamas County and East Portland. A member of the Democratic Party, he previously represented the 40th district in the Oregon House of Representatives from 2017 to 2023. Meek chaired the Senate Committee on Finance and Revenue from 2023 until October 2025.

== Early life and education ==
Meek graduated from Park University and served in the United States Air Force.

== Career ==
Meek is the former owner of Mt. Tabor Pub and Mark's Hawthorne Pub. Meek served on the Clackamas County Planning Commission, the North Clackamas Chamber of Commerce, the committee of the Oregon Association of Realtors, and the committee of the Portland Metropolitan Association of Realtors.

He won in the Democratic primary for the state House in 2016 to replace the retiring Brent Barton, and defeated Republican candidate Evon Tekorius in the general election with 51% of the vote.

In October 2021, Meek announced he would run for the redrawn Oregon Senate District 20 against incumbent Bill Kennemer, who was appointed to the seat in February of that year. The district was drawn to have a stronger Democratic voter advantage. Meek was unopposed in the May 2022 primary.

In the November 2022 general election, Meek narrowly defeated Kennemer by just over 500 votes in what was then the most expensive state legislative race in state history.

=== Oregon State Senate ===
During the 2025 regular session, Meek, then the chair of the Senate Finance and Revenue Committee and a member of the Joint Committee on Transportation Investment, said he would vote against House Bill 2025, a Democratic transportation funding package that would have raised nearly $15 billion over a decade. Meek said the proposed taxes and fees were too high for Oregonians facing a high cost of living. Wagner removed Meek from the committee and took his seat so the bill could advance, although it never received a floor vote. In a September 2025 special session, Meek voted for a scaled-back package, which passed.

On August 12, 2025, Meek emailed Senate Democratic colleagues arguing that Wagner should step down as Senate president, citing what he described as failures in managing the caucus, the response to the 2023 Republican walkout, and the handling of HB 2025. The caucus did not take up the request. In October 2025, Wagner replaced Meek as chair of Finance and Revenue with Anthony Broadman. Meek was named chair of the newly created Senate Interim Committee on Commerce and General Government. Asked whether the change was political retribution, Meek said, "It seems like it, but I don't know for sure."

In 2026, Meek was the only Senate Democrat to vote against Senate Bill 1599, which moved a referendum on the transportation package to the May 2026 ballot.

== Personal life ==
Meek and his wife have two children.

== Electoral history ==
=== 2016 ===
2016 Oregon State Representative, 40th district
Party	Candidate	Votes	%
Democratic	Mark Meek	16,282	51.0
Republican	Evon Tekorius	13,829	43.3
Independent	Christine VanOrder	865	2.7
Libertarian	Jeffrey J Langan	850	2.7
Write-in		83	0.3
Total votes		31,909	100%

=== 2018 ===
2018 Oregon State Representative, 40th district
Party	Candidate	Votes	%
Democratic	Mark Meek	17,428	55.6
Republican	Josh Hill	13,833	44.1
Write-in		72	0.2
Total votes		31,333	100%

=== 2020 ===
2020 Oregon State Representative, 40th district
Party	Candidate	Votes	%
Democratic	Mark W Meek	21,168	54.6
Republican	Josh Howard	17,535	45.2
Write-in		63	0.2
Total votes		38,766	100%

=== 2022 ===
2022 Oregon Senate 20th district election
Party	Candidate	Votes	%
Democratic	Mark Meek	31,317	50.33
Republican	Bill Kennemer (incumbent)	30,814	49.52
Write-in		94	0.15
Total votes		62,225	100.0

2022 Oregon Senate 20th district Democratic primary
Party	Candidate	Votes	%
Democratic	Mark Meek	11,334	98.83
Democratic	Write-in	134	1.17
Total votes		11,468	100.0
