= April Dobson =

American politician

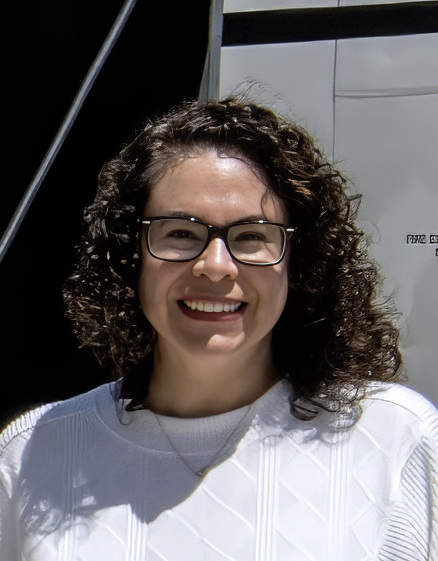
- Dobson in 2026

Member of the Oregon House of Representatives from the 39th district
- Incumbent
- Assumed office January 13, 2025
- Preceded by: Janelle Bynum

Member of the North Clackamas School District Board of Education, Position #7
- Incumbent
- Assumed office 2023
- Preceded by: Steven Schroedl

Personal details
- Born: Oregon, U.S.
- Party: Democratic

April Dobson is an American politician currently serving in the Oregon House of Representatives. A member of the Democratic Party, she represents the 39th district, which includes Happy Valley, Clackamas, and a small portion of outer southeastern Portland.

Dobson is also a member of the North Clackamas School Board.

== Early life and education ==
Dobson was born and raised in Oregon and graduated from Scappoose High School in Scappoose. She attended the University of Oregon, earning a bachelor's degree in 1997. Dobson lived in Los Angeles for a time where she was involved with helping to reopen libraries that had closed due to funding issues.

== Career ==
In 2023, Dobson ran for position #7 on the North Clackamas School Board to oppose three candidates backed by the conservative Oregon Mom's Union. She won in the May election. State Representative Janelle Bynum helped with the race, and when Bynum announced her candidacy for congress in the upcoming election, she encouraged Dobson to run for her seat. Dobson ran unopposed in the Democratic primary, and went on to defeat Republican Aimee Reiner in the November general election.

In the 2025 session, Dobson was appointed vice-chair of the House Education Committee. She was also appointed to the Housing and Homelessness Committee and the Committee on Economic Development, Small Business, and Trade.

== Personal life ==
Dobson is married and has 3 children, including one with autism. They live in Happy Valley.

== Electoral history ==
2024 Oregon State Representative, 39th district
Party	Candidate	Votes	%
Democratic	April Dobson	17,712	54.4
Republican	Aimee Reiner	14,753	45.3
Write-in		75	0.2
Total votes		32,540	100%
