= Eagle Point High School =

Location
- 203 N Platt Street; Eagle Point, Jackson County, Oregon 97524; United States; 42.47525°N 122.801946°W

Information
- Type: Public
- School district: Eagle Point School District
- Principal: Heather Marinucci
- Teaching staff: 53.33 (FTE)
- Grades: 9-12
- Enrollment: 1,004 (2023-2024)
- Student to teacher ratio: 18.83
- Campus: Suburban
- Colors: Royal Blue and Gold
- Athletics conference: OSAA 5A-2 Midwestern League
- Mascot: Eagle
- Team name: Eagles
- Rival: Crater High School
- Newspaper: Upper Rogue Independent
- Website: eaglepnt.k12.or.us

Eagle Point High School (EPHS) is a public high school in Eagle Point, Oregon, United States.

== Academics ==
In 2008, 83% of the school's seniors received a high school diploma. Of 294 students, 245 graduated, 29 dropped out, three received a modified diploma, and 17 were still in high school the following year.

In 2022, 93% of the school's seniors received a high school diploma. Of 212 students, 201 graduated and 11 dropped out.

In October 2009 the school was removed from the No Child Left Behind safety watch list, due to the following not occurring: "More than 1 percent of their students brought a weapon to school, were expelled for violence or committed a violent crime on campus."

In 2011, Eagle Point High School was awarded an "outstanding" report card from the state of Oregon due to its increase in state test scores.

== Athletics ==
Eagle Point High School athletic teams compete in the OSAA 5A-2 Midwestern League. The athletic director is Kacey McNulty and the athletics secretary is Barbara Smith.

State Championships:

- Boys Track and Field: 1957
- Girls Tennis: 1958
- Wrestling: 1978, 1985, 1988, 1989
- Baseball: 1978

== Controversy ==
In the fall of 2017, after one of their students committed suicide over repeated bullying caused by school inaction; the student body went on strike for 3 days. The school refused to allow those students to stand together in remembrance of their classmate to complete their OAKS testing.
