= Martha Schrader =

American politician

Clackamas County Commissioner
- Incumbent
- Assumed office January 3, 2013

Member of the Oregon Senate from the 20th district
- In office January 12, 2009 – January 10, 2011
- Preceded by: Kurt Schrader
- Succeeded by: Alan Olsen

Clackamas County Commissioner
- In office 2003–2009

Personal details
- Born: Martha Northam; August 12, 1953 (age 73) Canby, Oregon, U.S.
- Party: Democratic
- Spouse: Kurt Schrader (m. 1975; div. 2011)
- Children: 5
- Education: Cornell University (BS); University of Illinois at Urbana–Champaign (MS); Portland State University (M.Ed)

Martha Northam Schrader (née Northam, born August 12, 1953) is an American politician and educator who has served as a member of the Board of Commissioners of Clackamas County, Oregon since 2012. Schrader previously served in the Oregon Senate, representing the 20th Senate district in southeastern Clackamas County, including the cities of Barlow, Canby, Gladstone, Johnson City, Oregon City, and portions of Milwaukie.

== Early life and education ==
Born Martha Northam, she earned a Bachelor of Science degree from the Cornell University College of Agriculture and Life Sciences, a master's degree in entomology from the University of Illinois at Urbana–Champaign, and a master's degree in education from Portland State University, where she has taken doctoral courses in public policy and administration. She also is a Fellow at the American Leadership Forum.

== Career ==
In 1978, Martha and Kurt Schrader moved to Oregon, where they owned and operated Three Rivers Farm in Canby, growing and selling local organic produce from 1982 until 2012. From 1986 to 1994, Martha worked as a teacher and library media specialist in the Oregon City School District.

In 1996, Kurt Schrader was elected to the Oregon House of Representatives, and Martha served as his chief legislative analyst until his election to the Oregon Senate in 2002. That same year, Martha won the Democratic nomination to succeed her husband for his seat in the House, but she lost in the general election to Republican Alan Olsen.

In 2003, she was appointed to fill a vacancy on the Clackamas County Board of Commissioners. In 2004, she was elected to a full term, defeating Republican Tootie Smith. Schrader has served as chair of the commission in 2005 and 2007. Her peers voted her Vice Chair in January, 2020.

In 2008, Kurt was elected to the United States House of Representatives, and the Clackamas County Board of Commissioners, on which Martha served, selected her to fill Kurt's vacated state Senate seat (though she recused herself from voting).

Schrader was narrowly defeated in the 2010 election by Republican Alan Olsen. She was re-elected to the Clackamas County Board of Commissioners in 2012.

== Personal life ==
While at Cornell, Martha met Kurt Schrader, then an undergraduate government major. They were married in 1975 and have five children.

In May 2011, the Schraders announced their divorce.

== Electoral history ==
2010 Oregon State Senator, 20th district
| Party | Candidate | Votes | % |
|---|---|---|---|
| Republican | Alan Olsen | 23,044 | 50.2 |
| Democratic | Martha Schrader | 22,817 | 49.7 |
| Write-in | | 74 | 0.2 |
| Total votes | | 45,935 | 100% |
