= Janelle Bynum =

American politician (born 1975)

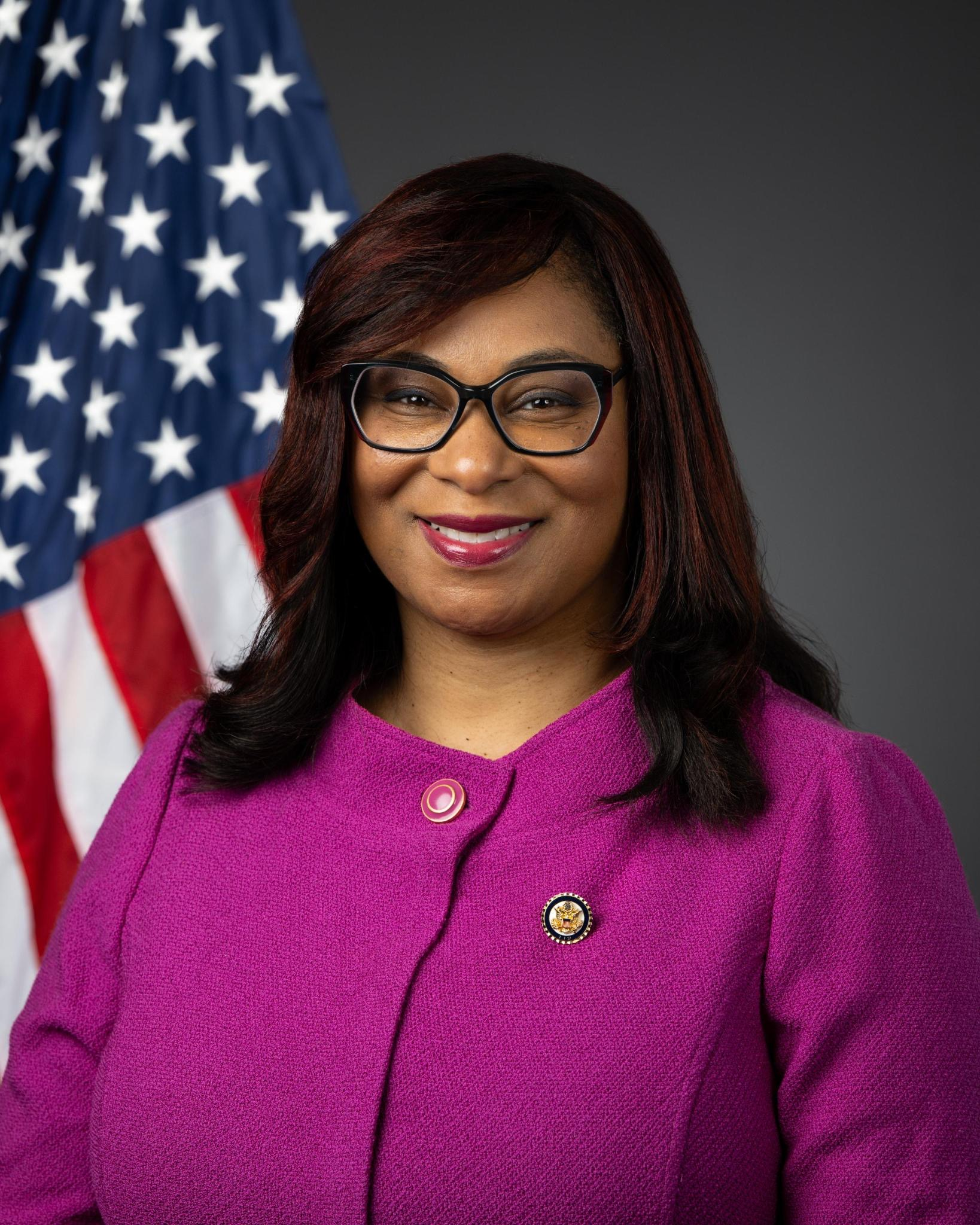
- Official portrait, 2025

Member of the U.S. House of Representatives from Oregon's 5th district
- Incumbent
- Assumed office January 3, 2025
- Preceded by: Lori Chávez-DeRemer

Member of the Oregon House of Representatives
- In office January 9, 2017 – January 3, 2025
- Preceded by: Shemia Fagan
- Succeeded by: April Dobson
- Constituency: 51st district (2017–2023); 39th district (2023–2025)

Personal details
- Born: Janelle Sojourner Irick; January 31, 1975 (age 51) Washington, D.C., U.S.
- Party: Democratic
- Spouse: Mark Bynum
- Children: 4
- Education: Florida A&M University (BS); University of Michigan (MBA)
- Website: House website Campaign website

Janelle Sojourner Bynum (née Irick; born January 31, 1975) is an American politician and businesswoman serving as the U.S. representative for Oregon's 5th congressional district since 2025. A member of the Democratic Party, she previously served in the Oregon House of Representatives from 2017 to 2025.

First elected to Oregon's legislature in 2016, Bynum previously represented the state's 51st district, which covered southern Multnomah County and northern Clackamas County, including the southeasternmost part of Portland, most of Happy Valley and Damascus and the surrounding area. She later represented the 39th district, which covers northern Clackamas County, including most of Happy Valley and parts of Oregon City, Milwaukie and the surrounding area.

On November 5, 2024, Bynum was elected to the United States House of Representatives to represent Oregon's 5th district after defeating incumbent Republican Lori Chavez-DeRemer in a close race. She is the first black member of Congress from Oregon.

== Early life and education ==
Bynum grew up in Washington, D.C. She attended Banneker High School and graduated from The Madeira School, and she interned on Capitol Hill during those years. She graduated with a bachelor's degree in electrical engineering from Florida A&M University in 1996 and with a Master in Business Administration from the University of Michigan in 2000.

As a student at Florida A&M University, Bynum received a scholarship from Boeing, and she later served as a summer associate for the company. After graduating from college, Bynum worked at General Motors as a steering systems engineer while pursuing her MBA.

While at General Motors, she was in Taiwan for a week following the 9/11 terrorist attacks' impact on air travel. Following this experience, in 2002, Bynum relocated to Clackamas County, Oregon to help her mother-in-law run a McDonald's franchise.

== Oregon House of Representatives (2017–2025) ==
=== 2016 legislative election ===
2016 Oregon House election results by district, 2016

In 2016, Bynum ran for Oregon's 51st House district after incumbent Shemia Fagan chose not to seek re-election. She won the Democratic primary with 66% of the vote, defeating former Damascus City Councilman Randy Shannon. In the general election, she faced Republican Lori Chavez-DeRemer, the mayor of Happy Valley, and won by a 51% to 49% margin in one of the most competitive state House races of the cycle.

=== 2018 legislative election ===
During her 2018 re-election campaign, while canvassing a neighborhood in her district, Bynum, who is Black, was reported to the police as a "suspicious person." That year, she again faced Chavez-DeRemer and won with 53% of the vote.

=== 2020 legislative election ===
In 2020, she won another term by defeating Republican Jane Hays, a school administrator, and Libertarian candidate Donald Crawford.

=== 2022 legislative election ===
In 2022, following redistricting, Bynum was drawn into the 39th District which no longer included East Portland and parts of Gresham and instead covered parts of unincorporated Clackamas County. Though the race was considered competitive by The Oregonian in early November 2022, she ultimately defeated Republican candidate Kori Haynes by a 10-point margin.

=== Tenure ===
In 2019, Bynum cast the sole vote in Oregon's House of Representatives against a bill that would give more time for rape survivors to file civil suits, extending the statute of limitations. In 2020, Bynum and other state legislators pressed Governor Kate Brown to release nearly 2,000 state prison inmates, about 14 percent of Oregon’s inmate population, commuting their sentences.

In January 2022, after Tina Kotek resigned her position to focus on her run for Governor, Bynum ran for the position of Oregon Speaker of the House against Representative Dan Rayfield of Corvallis. In a closed-door meeting of the caucus, Rayfield defeated Bynum for the Democratic caucus nomination for Speaker. Despite losing her party's nomination for Speaker, in February 2022, Bynum was the first Black person in Oregon's history to receive votes for Speaker of the House when she received four votes for Speaker.

As of 2023, Bynum served as chair of the House Committee on Economic Development and Small Business. In April 2023, as Chief Sponsor, Bynum supported the passage of Senate Bill 4, the Oregon CHIPS Act, a $210 million initiative to strengthen the state's semiconductor industry. The act provides funding for grants, loans, research, and land development to attract semiconductor companies and promote advanced manufacturing in Oregon. Bynum retired from the Oregon House of Representatives to run for congress, and was succeeded by April Dobson in January 2025.

== U.S. House of Representatives (2025 – present) ==
=== 2024 congressional election ===
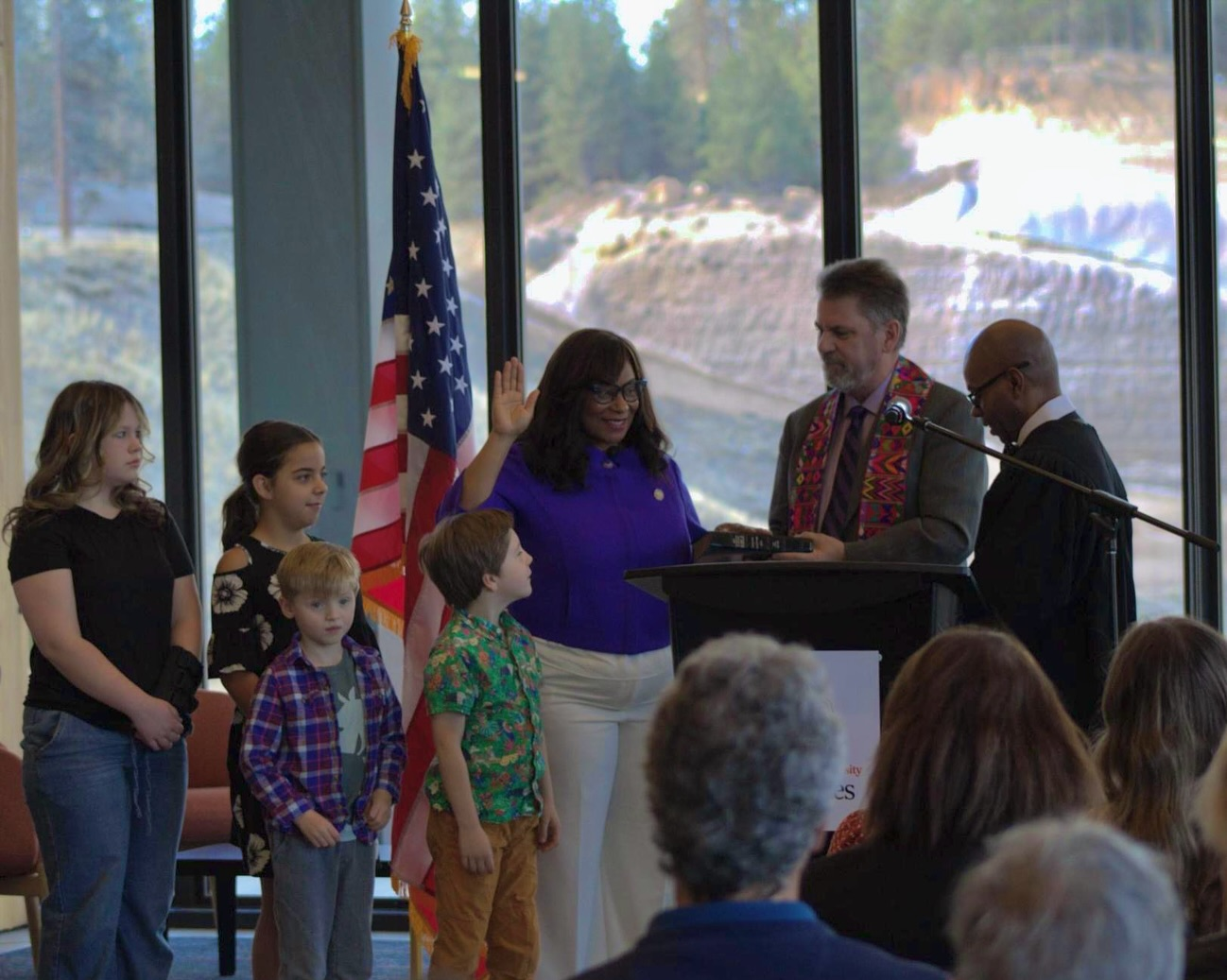
Bynum's ceremonial swearing into the 119th Congress in Bend, Oregon, 2025

On June 21, 2023, Bynum announced she would seek the Democratic nomination for Oregon's 5th congressional district, a seat then held by her 2016 and 2018 Republican opponent Lori Chavez-DeRemer. In January 2024, the DCCC named Bynum to its "Red to Blue" program, giving her access to increased fundraising, training, and guidance from the national Democratic Party. On May 21, 2024, Bynum defeated Jamie McLeod-Skinner in the Democratic primary.

On November 5, 2024, Bynum narrowly won the general election after defeating incumbent Republican Lori Chavez-DeRemer, who she had previously defeated twice in state-level races. The race was the 11th most expensive in the 2024 cycle, drawing over $26 million in outside spending. Bynum is the first black member of Congress elected in Oregon.

=== Tenure ===
In June 2026, Bynum was one of 10 House Democrats to sign onto the pro-capitalist-anti-socialist Promise to America, after three candidates backed by the Democratic Socialists of America won Democratic congressional primaries.

==== Committees ====
Bynum's committee assignments for the 119th Congress include:

- Committee on Financial Services
  - Subcommittee on Capital Markets
  - Subcommittee on Housing and Insurance

==== Caucuses ====
- Congressional Equality Caucus
- New Democrat Coalition
- Congressional Black Caucus
- Labor Caucus
- Future Forum (new member co-chair)
- Bipartisan Women's Caucus (vice chair)
- Rare Disease Caucus
- Congressional Taiwan Caucus

== Personal life ==
Bynum and her husband, Mark, have four children and live in Happy Valley. They own several McDonald's franchises in the Portland area. She is a Christian.

== Electoral history ==
=== 2024 ===
2024 Oregon 5th Congressional District election
Party	Candidate	Votes	%
Democratic	Janelle Bynum	191,365	47.69
Republican	Lori Chavez-DeRemer (incumbent)	180,420	44.96
Independent	Brett Smith	18,665	4.65
Libertarian	Sonja Feintech	6,193	1.54
Pacific Green	Andrea Townsend	4,155	1.04
Write-in		495	0.12
Total votes		401,293	100.0

2024 Oregon 5th Congressional District Democratic Primary election
Party	Candidate	Votes	%
Democratic	Janelle Bynum	55,473	69.43
Democratic	Jamie McLeod-Skinner	23,905	29.92
Write-in		510	0.63
Total votes		79,888	100.0

=== 2022 ===
2022 Oregon House of Representatives 39th district election
Party	Candidate	Votes	%
Democratic	Janelle Bynum (incumbent)	15,678	54.96
Republican	Kori Haynes	12,801	44.87
Write-in		48	0.17
Total votes		28,527	100.0

2022 Oregon House of Representatives 39th district Democratic primary
Party	Candidate	Votes	%
Democratic	Janelle Bynum (incumbent)	4,885	98.63
Write-in		68	1.37
Total votes		4,953	100.0

=== 2020 ===
2020 Oregon House of Representatives 51st district election
Party	Candidate	Votes	%
Democratic	Janelle Bynum (incumbent)	18,939	52.83
Republican	Jane Hays	15,466	43.15
Libertarian	Don Crawford	1,393	3.89
Write-in		48	0.13
Total votes		35,846	100.0

=== 2018 ===
2018 Oregon House of Representatives 51st district election
Party	Candidate	Votes	%
Democratic	Janelle Bynum (incumbent)	14,843	53.92
Republican	Lori Chavez-DeRemer	12,620	45.85
Write-in		63	0.23
Total votes		27,526	100.0

2018 Oregon House of Representatives 51st district Democratic primary
Party	Candidate	Votes	%
Democratic	Janelle Bynum (Incumbent)	3,405	98.04
Write-in		68	1.96
Total votes		3,405	100.0

=== 2016 ===
2016 Oregon House of Representatives 51st district election
Party	Candidate	Votes	%
Democratic	Janelle Bynum	14,310	50.85
Republican	Lori Chavez-DeRemer	13,746	48.85
Write-in		86	0.30
Total votes		28,142	100.0

2016 Oregon House of Representatives 51st district Democratic primary
Party	Candidate	Votes	%
Democratic	Janelle Bynum	4,218	68.91
Democratic	Randy Shannon	1,827	29.85
Write-in		76	1.24
Total votes		6,121	100.0

U.S. House of Representatives
Preceded by Lori Chávez-DeRemer	Member of the U.S. House of Representatives from Oregon's 5th congressional district 2025–present	Incumbent
U.S. order of precedence (ceremonial)
Preceded by Rob Bresnahan	United States representatives by seniority 371st	Succeeded by Herb Conaway
