= Rick Metsger =

American politician

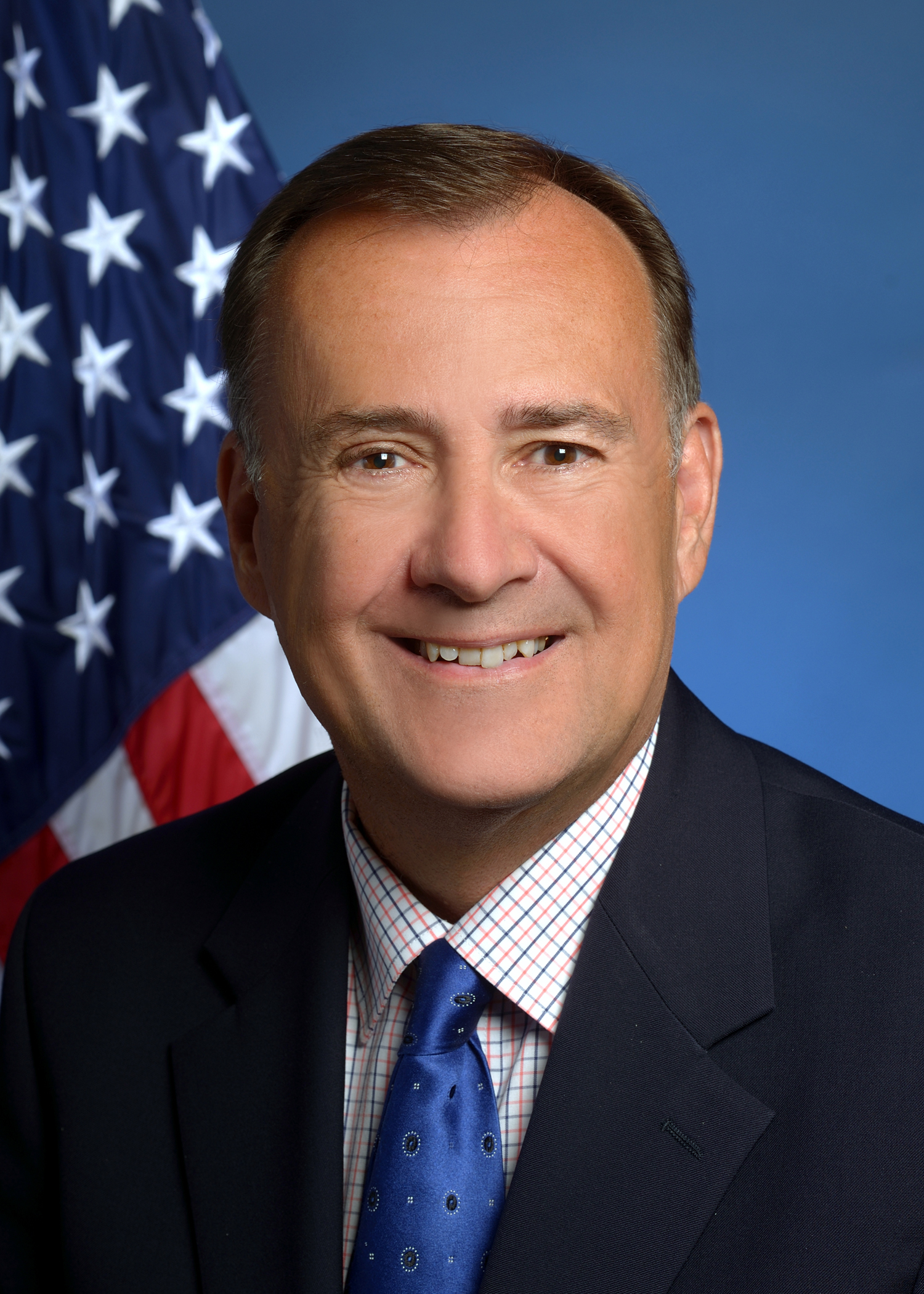

Member of the Oregon Senate from the 26th district
- In office 1999–2011
- Preceded by: Ken Baker
- Succeeded by: Chuck Thomsen

Personal details
- Born: Portland, Oregon
- Party: Democratic
- Spouse: Janet Metsger
- Occupation: public servant

Richard Thomas Metsger (born August 16, 1951) served in the Oregon State Senate from 1999 to 2011. President Barack Obama nominated Rick Metsger to serve on the board of the National Credit Union Administration on May 16, 2013. The U.S. Senate confirmed Metsger on August 1, 2013, and he took the oath of office on August 23, 2013. He served as the ninth NCUA board chairman from May 1, 2016, through January 22, 2017.

Prior to his political career, Metsger was a sportscaster, teacher, and served on the board of directors of a credit union in Portland, Oregon.

== Vice chairman of the NCUA board (August 4, 2014 – May 2016) ==
President Barack Obama nominated Metsger to serve on the board of the National Credit Union Administration on May 16, 2013. The United States Senate confirmed Metsger on August 1, 2013.

After he took the oath of office on August 23, 2013, Metsger shared his vision "for NCUA to be recognized as an agency that manages its own fiscal house well, proposes regulatory action that is effectively targeted to achieve the desired outcome without placing unnecessary burdens on the credit unions themselves and, above all, maintains the confidence and trust the American public places in their local credit union."

On September 18, 2014, the NCUA board designated board member Metsger as vice chairman of NCUA, pursuant to the requirements of NCUA's rules.

On Jan. 1, 2014, NCUA board chairman Debbie Matz appointed Metsger as NCUA's representative on the Board of NeighborWorks America, one of the nation's preeminent affordable housing and community development organizations.

He succeeded former NCUA board member Gigi Hyland, who left the NCUA board October 5, 2012. Metsger's term continues through August 2, 2017.

During his tenure as vice chairman, Metsger has focused on modernizing regulations and the federal credit union charter to provide credit unions with greater flexibility to innovate and grow as well as regulatory relief. Metsger led the agency's efforts to update its regulations concerning fixed assets and credit unions' fields-of-membership regulation.

== Chairman of the NCUA board (May 2, 2016 – January 22, 2017) ==
Metsger was appointed chairman of the NCUA board effective May 1, 2016 by President Barack Obama. As NCUA board chairman, Metsger heads the independent agency that charters, regulates, and supervises more than 3,700 federal credit unions. NCUA also operates the National Credit Union Share Insurance Fund, which protects the accounts of millions of Americans at more than 5,800 federally insured credit unions. Metsger succeeded Board Chairman Debbie Matz, whose tenure ended April 30, 2016.

== Early life and career ==
Metsger was born in Portland, Oregon, where he attended elementary school. He graduated from Centennial High School in Gresham. In 1972, he earned a bachelor's degree in communication from Lewis & Clark College, where he also earned a master's degree in teaching in 1975.

Metsger taught at Sam Barlow High School in Gresham from 1973 to 1976 and was an assistant basketball coach at Lewis & Clark during that same time.

From 1993 to 2001, he served on the board of directors of the Portland Teachers Credit Union.

== Sports anchor ==
In 1977, Metsger was hired as a sportscaster for Portland television station KOIN, eventually working his way up to sports anchor and sports director. In the early 1990s, Metsger was moved to a combination news and sports role. In August 1992, hours after completing an investigative report about leaking nuclear waste tanks at the Hanford Site, Metsger was fired from the station. The report aired three weeks later (narrated by another reporter), and later won the Best Investigative Reporting award from the Oregon Associated Press Broadcasters Association.

== Political career ==
In 1998, Metsger sought his first political office, running as a Democrat for the Oregon State Senate in the 14th state senate district (later renumbered the 26th due to redistricting). He was unopposed in the Democratic primary, and in the general election; he defeated former Oregon House member Jerry Grisham, who had defeated incumbent Ken Baker in the Republican primary. Metsger was re-elected in 2002 and 2006.

In 2008, he became a candidate for Oregon Secretary of State, running to succeed incumbent Bill Bradbury, but lost the Democratic primary to Kate Brown. Metsger sought the Democratic nomination for Oregon State Treasurer in the special election to replace Ben Westlund, but lost to fellow Democrat Ted Wheeler.

During Metsger's 12 years in the Oregon State Senate, he chaired the Business and Transportation Committee and served on committees with jurisdiction in the areas of education, revenue, the judiciary, human services and consumer protection.

Metsger sponsored laws that expanded state-chartered credit unions' field of membership, refunded millions of dollars to consumers, combated predatory payday lending, and created the largest public transportation investment in the state's history.

Metsger left the legislature in 2011. After his departure, Metsger owned and managed his own strategic communications consulting firm focused on the areas of financial services, capital construction, energy and transportation. He is currently Vice President of Legislative & Public Affairs for PW Lobby Group in Wilsonville, Oregon

== See also ==
- Oregon state elections, 2008

Preceded by Debbie Matz	Chairman, National Credit Union Administration Board; May 1, 2016 – January 22, 2017	Succeeded by J. Mark McWatters
