= Johnson City, Oregon =

- City
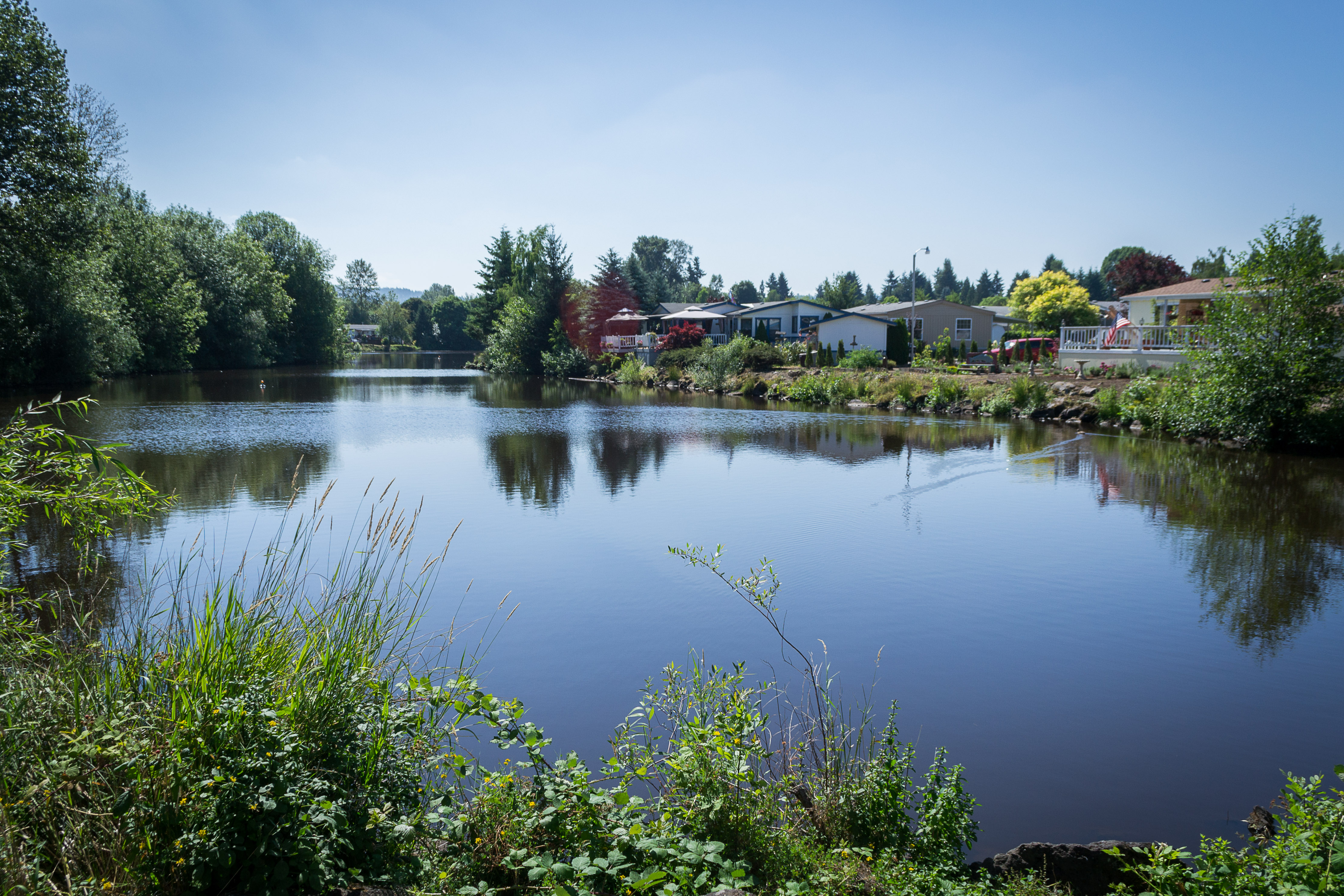
- Lake Leona in Johnson City, Oregon

- Location in Oregon
- Coordinates: 45°24′16″N 122°34′46″W
- Country: United States
- State: Oregon
- County: Clackamas
- Incorporated: 1970

Government
  - Mayor: Vince Whitehead

Area
  - Total: 0.069 sq mi (0.18 km^{2})
  - Land: 0.066 sq mi (0.17 km^{2})
  - Water: 0.0039 sq mi (0.01 km^{2})
- Elevation: 112 ft (34 m)

Population (2020)
  - Total: 539
  - Density: 8,299.8/sq mi (3,204.59/km^{2})
- Time zone: UTC-8 (Pacific)
  - Summer (DST): UTC-7 (Pacific)
- ZIP code: 97267
- Area codes: 503 and 971
- FIPS code: 41-37650
- GNIS feature ID: 2410145

Johnson City is a city in Clackamas County, Oregon, United States. As of the 2020 census, Johnson City had a population of 539. Because of its small area, its population density is over 8,000 persons per square mile, making it the most densely populated city in Oregon.

== History ==
On June 16, 1970, the residents of a trailer court owned by Delbert Johnson (1909–1986) voted 49-to-10 to incorporate. Johnson had started the development in 1959, and in 1968 was unsuccessful in having the area annexed to Gladstone. The 55th Oregon Legislative Assembly in 1969 established a boundary review board to prevent an increase in small incorporated cities, but proponents of Johnson City's incorporation had filed for an election before the law took effect. The community is also known as Johnson Mobile Estates.

Johnson City residents are not eligible to participate in the Clackamas County library system (LINCC), or any of its county partners. They are also not eligible for North Clackamas Parks and Recreation (NCPRD) programs, which includes Meals on Wheels.

In an effort to join LINCC, the Johnson City Tenant Collective (JCTC) put Measure 3–585 on the 2022 November General Election ballot. It did not pass, and there is an open investigation against the owner of Johnson Mobile Estates for possible voter intimidation.

== Geography ==
According to the United States Census Bureau, the city has a total area of 0.07 square miles (0.18 km^{2}), all of it land.

== Demographics ==
Historical population
Census	Pop.	Note	%±
1980	378		—
1990	586		55.0%
2000	634		8.2%
2010	566		−10.7%
2020	539		−4.8%
U.S. Decennial Census

=== 2020 census ===
As of the 2020 census, Johnson City had a population of 539. The median age was 53.3 years. 16.0% of residents were under the age of 18 and 29.1% of residents were 65 years of age or older. For every 100 females there were 87.2 males, and for every 100 females age 18 and over there were 85.7 males age 18 and over.

100.0% of residents lived in urban areas, while 0% lived in rural areas.

There were 275 households in Johnson City, of which 18.9% had children under the age of 18 living in them. Of all households, 34.5% were married-couple households, 24.0% were households with a male householder and no spouse or partner present, and 38.9% were households with a female householder and no spouse or partner present. About 43.3% of all households were made up of individuals and 26.2% had someone living alone who was 65 years of age or older.

There were 278 housing units, of which 1.1% were vacant. Among occupied housing units, 96.4% were owner-occupied and 3.6% were renter-occupied. The homeowner vacancy rate was 1.1% and the rental vacancy rate was <0.1%.

Racial composition as of the 2020 census
Race	Number	Percent
White	405	75.1%
Black or African American	4	0.7%
American Indian and Alaska Native	4	0.7%
Asian	11	2.0%
Native Hawaiian and Other Pacific Islander	0	0%
Some other race	44	8.2%
Two or more races	71	13.2%
Hispanic or Latino (of any race)	106	19.7%

=== 2010 census ===
As of the census of 2010, there were 566 people, 268 households, and 141 families living in the city. The population density was 8,085.7 inhabitants per square mile (3,121.9/km^{2}). There were 278 housing units at an average density of 3,971.4 per square mile (1,533.4/km^{2}). The racial makeup of the city was 84.3% White, 0.4% African American, 1.4% Native American, 1.9% Asian, 7.4% from other races, and 4.6% from two or more races. Hispanic or Latino of any race were 15.4% of the population.

There were 268 households, of which 19.8% had children under the age of 18 living with them, 36.9% were married couples living together, 13.1% had a female householder with no husband present, 2.6% had a male householder with no wife present, and 47.4% were non-families. 40.3% of all households were made up of individuals, and 14.9% had someone living alone who was 65 years of age or older. The average household size was 2.09 and the average family size was 2.84.

The median age in the city was 47.1 years. 18.7% of residents were under the age of 18; 6.2% were between the ages of 18 and 24; 22.8% were from 25 to 44; 33.8% were from 45 to 64; and 18.6% were 65 years of age or older. The gender makeup of the city was 48.8% male and 51.2% female.

=== 2000 census ===
As of the census of 2000, there were 634 people, 275 households, and 169 families living in the city. The population density was 11,061.5 inhabitants per square mile (4,270.9/km^{2}). There were 286 housing units at an average density of 4,989.9 per square mile (1,926.6/km^{2}). The racial makeup of the city was 93.69% White, 1.10% African American, 1.10% Native American, 0.47% Asian, 1.58% from other races, and 2.05% from two or more races. Hispanic or Latino of any race were 3.79% of the population.

There were 275 households, out of which 24.4% had children under the age of 18 living with them, 44.4% were married couples living together, 13.1% had a female householder with no husband present, and 38.2% were non-families. 32.4% of all households were made up of individuals, and 12.0% had someone living alone who was 65 years of age or older. The average household size was 2.28 and the average family size was 2.84.

In the city, the population was spread out, with 22.2% under the age of 18, 6.2% from 18 to 24, 30.0% from 25 to 44, 26.5% from 45 to 64, and 15.1% who were 65 years of age or older. The median age was 39 years. For every 100 females, there were 98.7 males. For every 100 females age 18 and over, there were 93.3 males.

The median income for a household in the city was $35,517, and the median income for a family was $36,985. Males had a median income of $32,500 versus $23,523 for females. The per capita income for the city was $16,967. About 6.1% of families and 8.1% of the population were below the poverty line, including 9.9% of those under age 18 and 10.7% of those age 65 or over.
