= 2010 Oregon legislative election =

Oregon legislative elections, 2010
- November 2, 2010

16 seats of the Oregon State Senate and 60 seats of the Oregon House of Representatives
	Majority party	Minority party
Party	Democratic	Republican
Seats before	54 (18 in Senate, 36 in House)	36 (12 Senate, 24 House)
Seats after	46 (16 in Senate, 30 in House)	44 (14 Senate, 30 House)
Seat change	▼8 ▼2 in Senate, ▼6 in House	▲8 ▲2 in Senate, ▲6 in House

The 2010 elections for the Oregon Legislative Assembly determined the composition of both houses for the 76th Oregon Legislative Assembly. The Republican and Democratic primary elections were on May 18, 2010, and the general election was held on November 2, 2010. Sixteen of the Oregon State Senate's thirty seats were up for election, as were all 60 seats of the Oregon House of Representatives.

In the previous session, the Democrats held supermajorities in both chambers: 18–12 in the Senate and 36–24 in the House. Following the election, Republicans reduced the Democratic majority to 16–14 in the Senate and gained enough seats in the House to make the chamber evenly divided between the parties, 30–30.

== Oregon Senate ==
2010 Oregon State Senate elections
- November 2, 2010

16 of 30 seats in the Oregon State Senate 16 seats needed for a majority
	Majority party	Minority party
Party	Democratic	Republican
Seats before	18	12
Seats after	16	14
Seat change	▼2	▲2
- Results of the elections: Republican gain Democratic hold Republican hold No election

=== Predictions ===
Source	Ranking	As of
Governing	Lean D	November 1, 2010

=== Results ===
12 of the 16 Senate seats up for election were held by Democrats, and the other four seats were previously held by Republicans. The Republicans held all their seats and added two: in District 26, Chuck Thomsen defeated Brent Barton for the seat previously held by Rick Metsger, who resigned to run for Oregon State Treasurer, and in District 20, incumbent Democrat Martha Schrader lost to Republican Alan Olsen by 227 votes.

District	Party	Incumbent	Status	Party	Candidate	Votes	%
3	Democratic	Alan Bates of Ashland	Re-elected	Democratic	Alan Bates	24,550	
3	Democratic	Alan Bates of Ashland	Re-elected	Republican	Dave Dotterrer	24,275	
3	Democratic	Alan Bates of Ashland	Re-elected		write-ins		
4	Democratic	Floyd Prozanski of Eugene	Re-elected	Democratic	Floyd Prozanski	29,077	
4	Democratic	Floyd Prozanski of Eugene	Re-elected	Republican	Marilyn Kittelman	20,961	
4	Democratic	Floyd Prozanski of Eugene	Re-elected		write-ins		
6	Democratic	Bill Morrisette of Springfield	Retired	Democratic	Lee Beyer	23,705	
6	Democratic	Bill Morrisette of Springfield	Retired	Republican	Michael P. Spasaro	19,626	
6	Democratic	Bill Morrisette of Springfield	Retired	Independent Party	Scott Reynolds	2,304	
6	Democratic	Bill Morrisette of Springfield	Retired		write-ins		
7	Democratic	Chris Edwards of Eugene	Re-elected	Democratic	Chris Edwards	29,308	
7	Democratic	Chris Edwards of Eugene	Re-elected	Republican	Karen Bodner	17,511	
7	Democratic	Chris Edwards of Eugene	Re-elected		write-ins		
8	Republican	Frank Morse of Albany	Re-elected	Republican	Frank Morse	26,466	
8	Republican	Frank Morse of Albany	Re-elected	Democratic	Dan Rayfield	21,563	
8	Republican	Frank Morse of Albany	Re-elected		write-ins		
10	Republican	Jackie Winters of Salem	Re-elected	Republican	Jackie Winters	32,956	
10	Republican	Jackie Winters of Salem	Re-elected	Democratic	Jackie Pierce	15,088	
10	Republican	Jackie Winters of Salem	Re-elected		write-ins		
11	Democratic	Peter Courtney of Salem	Re-elected	Democratic	Peter Courtney	14,883	
11	Democratic	Peter Courtney of Salem	Re-elected	Republican	Michael W. Forest	12,280	
11	Democratic	Peter Courtney of Salem	Re-elected		write-ins		
13	Republican	Larry George of Hillsboro	Re-elected	Republican	Larry George	30,457	
13	Republican	Larry George of Hillsboro	Re-elected	Democratic	Timi Parker	17,742	
13	Republican	Larry George of Hillsboro	Re-elected		write-ins		
15	Republican	Bruce Starr of Hillsboro	Re-elected	Republican	Bruce Starr	21,382	
15	Republican	Bruce Starr of Hillsboro	Re-elected	Democratic	Chuck Riley	19,533	
15	Republican	Bruce Starr of Hillsboro	Re-elected		write-ins		
16	Democratic	Betsy Johnson of Scappoose	Re-elected	Democratic	Betsy Johnson	27,182	
16	Democratic	Betsy Johnson of Scappoose	Re-elected	Republican	Bob Horning	22,657	
16	Democratic	Betsy Johnson of Scappoose	Re-elected		write-ins		
17	Democratic	Suzanne Bonamici of Beaverton	Re-elected	Democratic	Suzanne Bonamici	32,281	
17	Democratic	Suzanne Bonamici of Beaverton	Re-elected	Republican	Stevan C. Kirkpatrick	18,041	
17	Democratic	Suzanne Bonamici of Beaverton	Re-elected		write-ins		
19	Democratic	Richard Devlin of Tualatin	Re-elected	Democratic	Richard Devlin	30,179	
19	Democratic	Richard Devlin of Tualatin	Re-elected	Republican	Mary Kremer	25,038	
19	Democratic	Richard Devlin of Tualatin	Re-elected		write-ins		
20	Democratic	Martha Schrader of Canby	Lost re-election	Republican	Alan Olsen	23,044	
20	Democratic	Martha Schrader of Canby	Lost re-election	Democratic	Martha Schrader	22,817	
20	Democratic	Martha Schrader of Canby	Lost re-election		write-ins		
22	Democratic	Chip Shields of Portland	Re-elected	Democratic	Chip Shields	40,101	
22	Democratic	Chip Shields of Portland	Re-elected	Republican	Dwyane E. Runyan	5,345	
22	Democratic	Chip Shields of Portland	Re-elected		write-ins		
24	Democratic	Rod Monroe of Portland	Re-elected	Democratic	Rod Monroe	18,337	
24	Democratic	Rod Monroe of Portland	Re-elected	Republican	Rob Wheeler	16,905	
24	Democratic	Rod Monroe of Portland	Re-elected		write-ins		
26	Democratic	Rick Metsger of Mt. Hood	Retired	Republican	Chuck Thomsen	24,925	
26	Democratic	Rick Metsger of Mt. Hood	Retired	Democratic	Brent Barton	22,144	
26	Democratic	Rick Metsger of Mt. Hood	Retired		write-ins		

== House of Representatives ==
2010 Oregon House of Representatives elections
- November 2, 2010

60 seats of the Oregon House of Representatives 31 seats needed for a majority
	Majority party	Minority party
Party	Democratic	Republican
Seats before	36	24
Seats after	30	30
Seat change	▼6	▲6
- Results; Republican gain Democratic hold Republican hold

In the House, with all 60 seats up for re-election, Republicans gained six seats, making the chamber evenly split between Democrats and Republicans for the next session.

=== Predictions ===
Source	Ranking	As of
Governing	Likely D	November 1, 2010

=== Results ===
District	Party	Incumbent	Status	Party	Candidate	Votes	%
1	Republican	Wayne Krieger of Gold Beach	Re-elected	Republican	Wayne Krieger'	18,115	
1	Republican	Wayne Krieger of Gold Beach	Re-elected	Democratic	Eldon Rollins	6,875	
1	Republican	Wayne Krieger of Gold Beach	Re-elected		write-ins		
2	Republican	Tim Freeman of Roseburg	Re-elected	Republican	Tim Freeman	15,781	
2	Republican	Tim Freeman of Roseburg	Re-elected	Democratic	Harry McDermott	6,077	
2	Republican	Tim Freeman of Roseburg	Re-elected		write-ins		
3	Republican	Ron Maurer of Grants Pass	Retired	Republican	Wally Hicks	16,054	
3	Republican	Ron Maurer of Grants Pass	Retired	Constitution	Barbara L. Gonzalez	4,345	
3	Republican	Ron Maurer of Grants Pass	Retired		write-ins		
4	Republican	Dennis Richardson of Central Point	Re-elected	Republican	Dennis Richardson	17,495	
4	Republican	Dennis Richardson of Central Point	Re-elected	Democratic	Richard (Rick) Levine	7,279	
4	Republican	Dennis Richardson of Central Point	Re-elected		write-ins		
5	Democratic	Peter Buckley of Ashland	Re-elected	Democratic	Peter Buckley	16,120	
5	Democratic	Peter Buckley of Ashland	Re-elected	Republican	Sandra A. Abercrombie	9,632	
5	Democratic	Peter Buckley of Ashland	Re-elected		write-ins		
6	Republican	Sal Esquivel of Medford	Re-elected	Republican	Sal Esquivel	12,407	
6	Republican	Sal Esquivel of Medford	Re-elected	Democratic	Lynn Howe	9,468	
6	Republican	Sal Esquivel of Medford	Re-elected		write-ins		
7	Republican	Bruce Hanna of Roseburg	Re-elected	Republican	Bruce Hanna	16,066	
7	Republican	Bruce Hanna of Roseburg	Re-elected	Democratic	Sara Byers	8,832	
7	Republican	Bruce Hanna of Roseburg	Re-elected		write-ins		
8	Democratic	Paul Holvey of Eugene	Re-elected	Democratic	Paul Holvey	17,715	
8	Democratic	Paul Holvey of Eugene	Re-elected	Republican	Simone Gordon	6,581	
8	Democratic	Paul Holvey of Eugene	Re-elected		write-ins		
9	Democratic	Arnie Roblan of Coos Bay	Re-elected	Democratic	Arnie Roblan	12,094	
9	Democratic	Arnie Roblan of Coos Bay	Re-elected	Republican	R. Scott Roberts	10,824	
9	Democratic	Arnie Roblan of Coos Bay	Re-elected		write-ins		
10	Democratic	Jean Cowan of Newport	Re-elected	Democratic	Jean Cowan	14,475	
10	Democratic	Jean Cowan of Newport	Re-elected	Republican	Becky Lemler	10,323	
10	Democratic	Jean Cowan of Newport	Re-elected		write-ins		
11	Democratic	Phil Barnhart of Eugene	Re-elected	Democratic	Phil Barnhart	15,244	
11	Democratic	Phil Barnhart of Eugene	Re-elected	Republican	Kelly R. Lovelace	12,657	
11	Democratic	Phil Barnhart of Eugene	Re-elected		write-ins		
12	Democratic	Terry Beyer of Springfield	Re-elected	Democratic	Terry Beyer	10,170	
12	Democratic	Terry Beyer of Springfield	Re-elected	Republican	Sean VanGordon	7,727	
12	Democratic	Terry Beyer of Springfield	Re-elected		write-ins		
13	Democratic	Nancy Nathanson of Eugene	Re-elected	Democratic	Nancy Nathanson	15,967	
13	Democratic	Nancy Nathanson of Eugene	Re-elected	Republican	Bill Young	7,890	
13	Democratic	Nancy Nathanson of Eugene	Re-elected	Pacific Green	Mark Callahan	749	
13	Democratic	Nancy Nathanson of Eugene	Re-elected		write-ins		
14	Democratic	Val Hoyle of Eugene	Re-elected	Democratic	Val Hoyle	11,336	
14	Democratic	Val Hoyle of Eugene	Re-elected	Republican	Dwight Coon	10,041	
14	Democratic	Val Hoyle of Eugene	Re-elected	Independent Party	Kevin Prociw	1,078	
14	Democratic	Val Hoyle of Eugene	Re-elected		write-ins		
15	Republican	Andy Olson of Albany	Re-elected	Republican	Andy Olson	17,033	
15	Republican	Andy Olson of Albany	Re-elected	Democratic	Bud Laurent	7,901	
15	Republican	Andy Olson of Albany	Re-elected		write-ins		
16	Democratic	Sara Gelser of Corvallis	Re-elected	Democratic	Sara Gelser	15,782	
16	Democratic	Sara Gelser of Corvallis	Re-elected	Republican	Rose Cook	7,096	
16	Democratic	Sara Gelser of Corvallis	Re-elected		write-ins		
17	Republican	Sherrie Sprenger of Scio	Re-elected	Republican	Sherrie Sprenger	15,719	
17	Republican	Sherrie Sprenger of Scio	Re-elected	Democratic	Richard Harisay	5,689	
17	Republican	Sherrie Sprenger of Scio	Re-elected		write-ins		
18	Republican	Vic Gilliam of Silverton	Re-elected	Republican	Vic Gilliam	14,558	
18	Republican	Vic Gilliam of Silverton	Re-elected	Democratic	Rodney E. Orr	7,919	
18	Republican	Vic Gilliam of Silverton	Re-elected	Libertarian	Martin Soehrman	489	
18	Republican	Vic Gilliam of Silverton	Re-elected		write-ins		
19	Republican	Kevin Cameron of Salem	Re-elected	Republican	Kevin Cameron	14,532	
19	Republican	Kevin Cameron of Salem	Re-elected	Democratic	Claudia Kyle	9,166	
19	Republican	Kevin Cameron of Salem	Re-elected		write-ins		
20	Republican	Vicki Berger of Salem	Re-elected	Republican	Vicki Berger	15,143	
20	Republican	Vicki Berger of Salem	Re-elected	Democratic	Mike Powers	8,816	
20	Republican	Vicki Berger of Salem	Re-elected		write-ins		
21	Democratic	Brian Clem of Salem	Re-elected	Democratic	Brian Clem	9,028	
21	Democratic	Brian Clem of Salem	Re-elected	Republican	Marvin Sannes	6,494	
21	Democratic	Brian Clem of Salem	Re-elected		write-ins		
22	Democratic	Betty Komp of Woodburn	Re-elected	Democratic	Betty Komp	6,083	
22	Democratic	Betty Komp of Woodburn	Re-elected	Republican	Kathy LeCompte	5,460	
22	Democratic	Betty Komp of Woodburn	Re-elected		write-ins		
23	Republican	Jim Thompson of Dallas	Re-elected	Republican	Jim Thompson	16,371	
23	Republican	Jim Thompson of Dallas	Re-elected	Democratic	Wesley W. West	7,661	
23	Republican	Jim Thompson of Dallas	Re-elected		write-ins		
24	Republican	Jim Weidner of McMinnville	Re-elected	Republican	Jim Weidner	13,787	
24	Republican	Jim Weidner of McMinnville	Re-elected	Democratic	Susan Sokol Blosser	11,380	
24	Republican	Jim Weidner of McMinnville	Re-elected		write-ins		
25	Republican	Kim Thatcher of Keizer	Re-elected	Republican	Kim Thatcher	14,770	
25	Republican	Kim Thatcher of Keizer	Re-elected	Democratic	Jim Dyer	7,530	
25	Republican	Kim Thatcher of Keizer	Re-elected		write-ins		
26	Republican	Matt Wingard of Wilsonville	Re-elected	Republican	Matt Wingard	16,362	
26	Republican	Matt Wingard of Wilsonville	Re-elected	Democratic	Sandy Webb	10,382	
26	Republican	Matt Wingard of Wilsonville	Re-elected		write-ins		
27	Democratic	Tobias Read of Beaverton	Re-elected	Democratic	Tobias Read	15,398	
27	Democratic	Tobias Read of Beaverton	Re-elected	Republican	Dan Lucas	9,328	
27	Democratic	Tobias Read of Beaverton	Re-elected		write-ins		
28	Democratic	Jeff Barker of Aloha	Re-elected	Democratic	Jeff Barker	10,314	
28	Democratic	Jeff Barker of Aloha	Re-elected	Republican	Bill Berg	7,787	
28	Democratic	Jeff Barker of Aloha	Re-elected		write-ins		
29	Democratic	Chuck Riley of Hillsboro	Retired	Republican	Katie Eyre Brewer	9,035	
29	Democratic	Chuck Riley of Hillsboro	Retired	Democratic	Katie Riley	8,009	
29	Democratic	Chuck Riley of Hillsboro	Retired		write-ins		
30	Democratic	David Edwards of Hillsboro	Retired	Republican	Shawn Lindsay	12,501	
30	Democratic	David Edwards of Hillsboro	Retired	Democratic	Doug Ainge	10,893	
30	Democratic	David Edwards of Hillsboro	Retired		write-ins		
31	Democratic	Brad Witt of Clatskanie	Re-elected	Democratic	Brad Witt	13,804	
31	Democratic	Brad Witt of Clatskanie	Re-elected	Republican	Ed DeCoste	10,300	
31	Democratic	Brad Witt of Clatskanie	Re-elected		write-ins		
32	Democratic	Deborah Boone of Cannon Beach	Re-elected	Democratic	Deborah Boone	12,977	
32	Democratic	Deborah Boone of Cannon Beach	Re-elected	Republican	Lew Barnes	11,832	
32	Democratic	Deborah Boone of Cannon Beach	Re-elected		write-ins		
33	Democratic	Mitch Greenlick of Portland	Re-elected	Democratic	Mitch Greenlick	20,101	
33	Democratic	Mitch Greenlick of Portland	Re-elected	Republican	Michael Bieker	10,862	
33	Democratic	Mitch Greenlick of Portland	Re-elected		write-ins		
34	Democratic	Chris Harker of Beaverton	Re-elected	Democratic	Chris Harker	11,439	
34	Democratic	Chris Harker of Beaverton	Re-elected	Republican	Tyler Hill	7,420	
34	Democratic	Chris Harker of Beaverton	Re-elected	Libertarian	James Foster	476	
34	Democratic	Chris Harker of Beaverton	Re-elected		write-ins		
35	Democratic	Larry Galizio of Tigard	Retired	Democratic	Margaret Doherty	12,991	
35	Democratic	Larry Galizio of Tigard	Retired	Republican	Gordon Fiddes	9,864	
35	Democratic	Larry Galizio of Tigard	Retired		write-ins		
36	Democratic	Mary Nolan of Portland	Re-elected	Democratic	Mary Nolan	21,407	
36	Democratic	Mary Nolan of Portland	Re-elected	Republican	Diane Schendel	5,776	
36	Democratic	Mary Nolan of Portland	Re-elected		write-ins		
37	Republican	Scott Bruun of West Linn	Retired	Republican	Julie Parrish	13,498	
37	Republican	Scott Bruun of West Linn	Retired	Democratic	Will Rasmussen	12,982	
37	Republican	Scott Bruun of West Linn	Retired		write-ins		
38	Democratic	Chris Garrett of Lake Oswego	Re-elected	Democratic	Chris Garrett	16,815	
38	Democratic	Chris Garrett of Lake Oswego	Re-elected	Republican	Rob Gardier	10,957	
38	Democratic	Chris Garrett of Lake Oswego	Re-elected		write-ins		
39	Republican	Bill Kennemer of Oregon City	Re-elected	Republican	Bill Kennemer	14,284	
39	Republican	Bill Kennemer of Oregon City	Re-elected	Democratic	Alice Norris	10,284	
39	Republican	Bill Kennemer of Oregon City	Re-elected		write-ins		
40	Democratic	Dave Hunt of Gladstone	Re-elected	Democratic	Dave Hunt	12,500	
40	Democratic	Dave Hunt of Gladstone	Re-elected	Republican	Deborah J. Gerritzen	8,135	
40	Democratic	Dave Hunt of Gladstone	Re-elected		write-ins		
41	Democratic	Carolyn Tomei of Milwaukie	Re-elected	Democratic	Carolyn Tomei	17,092	
41	Democratic	Carolyn Tomei of Milwaukie	Re-elected	Republican	Hugo Schulz	5,385	
41	Democratic	Carolyn Tomei of Milwaukie	Re-elected		write-ins		
42	Democratic	Jules Bailey of Portland	Re-elected	Democratic	Jules Bailey	22,020	
42	Democratic	Jules Bailey of Portland	Re-elected	Republican	Cliff Hutchison	2,470	
42	Democratic	Jules Bailey of Portland	Re-elected	Pacific Green	Chris Extine	1,405	
42	Democratic	Jules Bailey of Portland	Re-elected		write-ins		
43	Democratic	Lew Frederick of Portland	Re-elected	Democratic	Lew Frederick	19,821	
43	Democratic	Lew Frederick of Portland	Re-elected		write-ins		
44	Democratic	Tina Kotek of Portland	Re-elected	Democratic	Tina Kotek	16,517	
44	Democratic	Tina Kotek of Portland	Re-elected	Republican	Kitty C. Harmon	3,812	
44	Democratic	Tina Kotek of Portland	Re-elected		write-ins		
45	Democratic	Michael Dembrow of Portland	Re-elected	Democratic	Michael Dembrow	18,945	
45	Democratic	Michael Dembrow of Portland	Re-elected	Republican	Anne Marie Gurney	4,932	
45	Democratic	Michael Dembrow of Portland	Re-elected		write-ins		
46	Democratic	Ben Cannon of Portland	Re-elected	Democratic	Ben Cannon	18,418	
46	Democratic	Ben Cannon of Portland	Re-elected	Republican	Russell Turner	3,827	
46	Democratic	Ben Cannon of Portland	Re-elected		write-ins		
47	Democratic	Jefferson Smith of Portland	Re-elected	Democratic	Jefferson Smith	10,395	
47	Democratic	Jefferson Smith of Portland	Re-elected	Republican	Dee Flowers	6,256	
47	Democratic	Jefferson Smith of Portland	Re-elected		write-ins		
48	Democratic	Mike Schaufler of Happy Valley	Re-elected	Democratic	Mike Schaufler	9,719	
48	Democratic	Mike Schaufler of Happy Valley	Re-elected	Independent Party	Jeff Caton	7,246	
48	Democratic	Mike Schaufler of Happy Valley	Re-elected		write-ins		
49	Democratic	Nick Kahl of Gresham	Lost re-election	Republican	Matt Wand	8,967	
49	Democratic	Nick Kahl of Gresham	Lost re-election	Democratic	Nick Kahl	7,857	
49	Democratic	Nick Kahl of Gresham	Lost re-election		write-ins		
50	Democratic	Greg Matthews of Gresham	Re-elected	Democratic	Greg Matthews	10,550	
50	Democratic	Greg Matthews of Gresham	Re-elected	Republican	Andre Wang	8,983	
50	Democratic	Greg Matthews of Gresham	Re-elected		write-ins		
51	Democratic	Brent Barton of Clackamas	Retired	Republican	Patrick Sheehan	12,409	
51	Democratic	Brent Barton of Clackamas	Retired	Democratic	Cheryl Myers	10,330	
51	Democratic	Brent Barton of Clackamas	Retired		write-ins		
52	Democratic	Suzanne VanOrman of Corbett	Lost re-election	Republican	Mark Johnson	14,012	
52	Democratic	Suzanne VanOrman of Corbett	Lost re-election	Democratic	Suzanne VanOrman	10,739	
52	Democratic	Suzanne VanOrman of Corbett	Lost re-election		write-ins		
53	Republican	Gene Whisnant of Sunriver	Re-elected	Republican	Gene Whisnant	21,532	
53	Republican	Gene Whisnant of Sunriver	Re-elected	Democratic	John Huddle	8,012	
53	Republican	Gene Whisnant of Sunriver	Re-elected		write-ins		
54	Democratic	Judy Stiegler of Bend	Lost re-election	Republican	Jason Conger	16,391	
54	Democratic	Judy Stiegler of Bend	Lost re-election	Democratic	Judy Stiegler	12,771	
54	Democratic	Judy Stiegler of Bend	Lost re-election	Independent	Mike Kozak	2,074	
54	Democratic	Judy Stiegler of Bend	Lost re-election		write-ins		
55	Republican	George Gilman of Bend	Retired	Republican	Mike McLane	17,204	
55	Republican	George Gilman of Bend	Retired		write-ins		
56	Republican	Bill Garrard of Klamath Falls	Re-elected	Republican	Bill Garrard	15,402	
56	Republican	Bill Garrard of Klamath Falls	Re-elected		write-ins		
57	Republican	Greg Smith of Heppner	Re-elected	Republican	Greg Smith	16,211	
57	Republican	Greg Smith of Heppner	Re-elected	Democratic	Jean A. Falbo	4,721	
57	Republican	Greg Smith of Heppner	Re-elected		write-ins		
58	Republican	Bob Jenson of Pendleton	Re-elected	Republican	Bob Jenson	11,310	
58	Republican	Bob Jenson of Pendleton	Re-elected	Democratic	Pete Wells	3,772	
58	Republican	Bob Jenson of Pendleton	Re-elected		write-ins		
59	Republican	John Huffman of The Dalles	Re-elected	Republican	John Huffman	15,033	
59	Republican	John Huffman of The Dalles	Re-elected	Democratic	Will Boettner	6,565	
59	Republican	John Huffman of The Dalles	Re-elected		write-ins		
60	Republican	Cliff Bentz of Ontario	Re-elected	Republican	Cliff Bentz	15,341	
60	Republican	Cliff Bentz of Ontario	Re-elected		write-ins		

== See also ==
- 75th Oregon Legislative Assembly (2009–2010)
- 76th Oregon Legislative Assembly (2011–2012)

== Sources ==
ORESTAR, the online elections system of the Oregon Secretary of State's Elections Division
