= 2006 Oregon primary election =

== Oregon Legislative Assembly ==
The following table shows all primary candidates for the Oregon state legislature in 2006. For the general election, see Oregon statewide elections, 2006#Results.

Senate District, incumbent, county(s)	House District, incumbent	Democratic Candidates	Republican Candidates	notes
1 Jeff Kruse Curry (Coos) (Douglas)	1 Wayne Krieger		Wayne Krieger
1 Jeff Kruse Curry (Coos) (Douglas)	2 Susan Morgan		Susan Morgan
2 Jason Atkinson Josephine	3 Gordon Anderson	Howard Owens	Ron Maurer	Atkinson ran for Governor, received 22%
2 Jason Atkinson Josephine	4 Dennis Richardson	Richard Koopmans	Dennis Richardson	Atkinson ran for Governor, received 22%
3 Alan Bates Jackson		Alan Bates	Lynn Aiello
3 Alan Bates Jackson	5 Peter Buckley	Peter Buckley
3 Alan Bates Jackson	6 Sal Esquivel	Mike Moran	Sal Esquivel
4 Floyd Prozanski (Douglas) (Lane)		Floyd Prozanski	Bill Eddie
4 Floyd Prozanski (Douglas) (Lane)	7 Bruce Hanna		Bruce Hanna
4 Floyd Prozanski (Douglas) (Lane)	8 Paul Holvey	Paul R. Holvey	Andrew Hill
5 Joanne Verger Lincoln (Lane) (Douglas) (Coos) (Yamhill) (Tillamook)	9 Arnie Roblan	Arnie Roblan	Al Pearn
5 Joanne Verger Lincoln (Lane) (Douglas) (Coos) (Yamhill) (Tillamook)	10 Alan Brown	Jean Cowan	Alan Brown
6 Bill Morrisette (Lane) (Linn)		Bill Morrisette	Renee Lindsey
6 Bill Morrisette (Lane) (Linn)	11 Phil Barnhart	Phil Barnhart
6 Bill Morrisette (Lane) (Linn)	12 Elizabeth Terry Beyer	Terry Beyer	Bill Lioio
7 Vicki Walker (Lane)		Vicki L. Walker	Jim Torrey
7 Vicki Walker (Lane)	13 Robert Ackerman	Nancy Nathanson	Thomas Ray Albright
7 Vicki Walker (Lane)	14 Debi Farr	Chris Edwards	Debi Farr
8 Frank Morse (Benton) (Linn)		Mario E. Magana	Frank Morse
8 Frank Morse (Benton) (Linn)	15 Andy Olson	Sam H.W Sappington	Andy Olson
8 Frank Morse (Benton) (Linn)	16 Sara Gesler	Sara A. Gesler	Robin M. Brown
9 Roger Beyer (Clackamas) (Linn)	17 Jeff Kropf	Dan Thackaberry	Jeff Kropf
9 Roger Beyer (Clackamas) (Linn)	18 Mac Sumner	Jim Gilbert	Mac Summer; James L. Buchal; Dale Settje
10 Jackie Winters (Marion)		Paul Evans	Jackie Winters
10 Jackie Winters (Marion)	19 Kevin Cameron	Brian Grisham	Kevin Cameron
10 Jackie Winters (Marion)	20 Vicki Berger	Connie Garcia	Vicki Berger
Senate District, incumbent, county(s)	House District, incumbent	Democratic Candidates	Republican Candidates	notes
11 Peter Courtney (Marion)		Peter Courtney	Jared Thatcher
11 Peter Courtney (Marion)	21 Billy Dalto	Brian Clem	Billy Dalto
11 Peter Courtney (Marion)	22 Betty Komp	Betty Komp	Carl Wieneke
12 Gary George (Polk) (Yamhill)	23 Brian Boquist	Jason Brown	Brian Boquist
12 Gary George (Polk) (Yamhill)	24 Donna Nelson	Sal Peralta	Donna Nelson
13 Charles Starr (Washington) (Yamhill) (Polk)		Rick Ross	Larry George; Charles Starr	Oregonian endorsed George in Rep. primary
13 Charles Starr (Washington) (Yamhill) (Polk)	25 Kim Thatcher	Susan Keen; Charles E. Lee	Kim Thatcher	Oregonian endorsed George in Rep. primary
13 Charles Starr (Washington) (Yamhill) (Polk)	26 Jerry Krummel	Lee Coleman	Jerry Krummel	Oregonian endorsed George in Rep. primary
14 Ryan Deckert D (Washington)	27 Mark Hass	Mike Bohan (MD); Tobias Read (MD)	Dominic Biggi
14 Ryan Deckert D (Washington)	28 Jeff Barker	Jeff Barker	Eldon Derville-Teer; Christopher Mentrum
15 Bruce Starr (Washington)		John Napolitano	Bruce Starr
15 Bruce Starr (Washington)	29 Chuck Riley	Chuck Riley	Barry S. Lee; Terry Rilling
15 Bruce Starr (Washington)	30 Derrick Kitts	David Edwards	Everett Curry
16 Betsy Johnson D Clatsop Columbia (Tillamook) (Washington)		Betsy Johnson (MD)	Don Fell
16 Betsy Johnson D Clatsop Columbia (Tillamook) (Washington)	31 Brad Witt	Brad Witt (MD)	Mike Kocher
16 Betsy Johnson D Clatsop Columbia (Tillamook) (Washington)	32 Deborah Boone	Deborah Boone	Norm Myers
17 Charlie Ringo D (Multnomah)		Brad Avakian (MD); Sam Chase		Oregonian endorsed Avakian in Dem primary
17 Charlie Ringo D (Multnomah)	33 Mitch Greenlick	Mitch Greenlick (MD); Jeffrey A. Kee	Mark Eggleston	Oregonian endorsed Avakian in Dem primary
17 Charlie Ringo D (Multnomah)	34 Brad Avakian	Suzanne Bonamici	Joan Draper	Oregonian endorsed Avakian in Dem primary
18 Ginny Burdick D (Multnomah) (Washington)	35 Larry Galizio	Larry Galizio (MD)	Shirley Parsons
18 Ginny Burdick D (Multnomah) (Washington)	36 Mary Nolan	Mary Nolan (MD)
19 Richard Devlin D (Clackamas)		Richard Devlin (MD)	David Newell
19 Richard Devlin D (Clackamas)	37 Scott Bruun	J. Marty Olson; Bev Backa; Gerritt Rosenthal	Scott Bruun
19 Richard Devlin D (Clackamas)	38 Greg Macpherson	Greg Macpherson (MD)	Fred Bremner
20 Kurt Schrader (Clackamas)		Kurt Schrader	Thomas F. Lemons
20 Kurt Schrader (Clackamas)	39 Wayne Scott	Mike Caudle	Wayne Scott
20 Kurt Schrader (Clackamas)	40 Dave Hunt	Dave Hunt
Senate District, incumbent, county(s)	House District, incumbent	Democratic Candidates	Republican Candidates	notes
21 Kate Brown (Multnomah)	41 Carolyn Tomei	Carolyn Tomei (MD)		Jeff Cropp is also running, on the Pacific Green Party ticket.; Oregonian endorsed Rosenbaum
21 Kate Brown (Multnomah)	42 Diane Rosenbaum	Diane Rosenbaum (MD); Gordon Hillesland		Jeff Cropp is also running, on the Pacific Green Party ticket.; Oregonian endorsed Rosenbaum
22 Margaret Carter (Multnomah)	43 Chip Shields	Chip Shields (MD)
22 Margaret Carter (Multnomah)	44 Gary Hansen	Tina Kotek (MD); Mark Kirchmeier; Jim Robison (MD)	Jay Kushner	Oregonian endorsed Kotek
23 Avel Gordly (Multnomah)	45 Jackie Dingfelder	Jackie Dingfelder (MD)		Paul Loney ran as a Pacific Green Party candidate.; Bing Wong, Democratic party leader for this district; Oregonian endorsed Cannon, and positive mention of Hennrich
23 Avel Gordly (Multnomah)	46 Steve March	Ben Cannon; Mary Lou Hennrich (MD); Cindy Banzer; Mary Botkin; Lynn Partin	William Cornett	Paul Loney ran as a Pacific Green Party candidate.; Bing Wong, Democratic party leader for this district; Oregonian endorsed Cannon, and positive mention of Hennrich
24 Frank Shields (Multnomah)		Jesse Cornett (MD?); Rod Monroe	T.J. Reilly	Oregonian endorsed Cornett
24 Frank Shields (Multnomah)	47 Jeff Merkley	Jeff Merkley (MD)	Bruce McCain	Oregonian endorsed Cornett
24 Frank Shields (Multnomah)	48 Mike Shaufler	Mike Schaufler (MD)	Dave Mowry	Oregonian endorsed Cornett
25 Laurie Monnes Anderson (Multnomah)	49 Karen Minnis	Rob Brading (MD)	Karen Minnis
25 Laurie Monnes Anderson (Multnomah)	50 John Lim	Jill Selman-Ringer (MD)	John Lim
26 Rick Metsger D (Multnomah) (Clackamas) Hood River		Rick Metsger (MD)	Carol York
26 Rick Metsger D (Multnomah) (Clackamas) Hood River	51 Linda Flores	Ryan Olds; Gary Blackburn	Linda Flores
26 Rick Metsger D (Multnomah) (Clackamas) Hood River	52 Patti Smith	Suzanne VanOrman (MD)	Patti Smith
27 Ben Westlund (Deschutes)	53 Gene Whisnant	Bill A. Smith	Gene Whisnant	Westlund dropped (Rep) party affil to run for gov as an indep.; What happens to his seat if he wins Gov race?
27 Ben Westlund (Deschutes)	54 Chuck Burley	Phil Philiben	Chuck Burley	Westlund dropped (Rep) party affil to run for gov as an indep.; What happens to his seat if he wins Gov race?
28 Doug Whitsett Lake Crook Klamath (Deschutes) (Jackson)	55 George Gilman		George Gilman
28 Doug Whitsett Lake Crook Klamath (Deschutes) (Jackson)	56 Bill Garrard	James Calvert	Bill Garrard
29 David Nelson Morrow Umatilla Union Wallowa	57 Greg Smith	Nancy Wolfe	Greg Smith
29 David Nelson Morrow Umatilla Union Wallowa	58 Bob Jenson	Ben Talley	Bob Jenson
30 Ted Ferrioli Wasco Sherman Gilliam Jefferson Wheeler (Deschutes) Grant Baker Harney Malheur	59 John Dallum	Jim Gilbertson	John Dallum
30 Ted Ferrioli Wasco Sherman Gilliam Jefferson Wheeler (Deschutes) Grant Baker Harney Malheur	60 Tom Butler	Peter Hall	Tom Butler
Senate District, incumbent, county(s)	House District, incumbent	Democratic Candidates	Republican Candidates	notes

== Judicial races ==
Dist. num & county(s)	Position	incumbent	candidates	notes
1 - Jackson	9		Lisa C. Greif; Joe Charter; Paul L. Henderson III; Ron Grensky
2 - Lane	14		James Chaney; Debra Vogt; Alan Leiman; Beverly Anderson
3 - Marion	2		Paul Lipscomb; Ross Day
4 - Multnomah	31	Gernant	Cheryl Albrecht; Julia Philbrook; Lane Borg; Kathleen Payne; Trung D. Tu	Cheryl Albrecht was endorsed by the Oregonian and the Portland Mercury. Albrecht was also voted #1 candidate by Multnomah County lawyers.
5 - Clackamas	11		Susie L. Huva; David F. (Dave) Paul
6 - Morrow, Umatilla	5		Christopher R. Brauer; Steven Fogelson; Annetta L. Spicer
7 - Gilliam, Hood River, Sherman, Wasco, Wheeler
8 - Baker
9 - Malheur
10 - Union, Wallowa
11 - Deschutes
12 - Polk
13 - Klamath
14 - Josephine
15 - Coos, Curry
16 - Douglas
17 - Lincoln
18 - Clatsop	3		Mary Ann Murk; Cindee S. Matyas; Michael J. Dooney; Don H. Haller, III
19 - Columbia
20 - Washington	6		Vincent A. Deguc; Kevin W. Luby; Charlie Bailey
20 - Washington	13		Jim Fun; Leon S. Colas
21 - Benton
22 - Crook, Jefferson
23 - Linn
24 - Grant, Harney
25 - Yamhill
26 - Lake
27 - Tillamook
