= Oregon's 29th House district =

Legislative districts in the state of Oregon

Oregon's 29th House district after redistricting after the 2020 Census

District 29 of the Oregon House of Representatives is one of 60 House legislative districts in the state of Oregon. As of 2021, the district is contained entirely within Washington County and contains Forest Grove and Cornelius as well as most of Hillsboro. The current representative for the district is Democrat Susan McLain of Forest Grove.

== Election results ==
District boundaries have changed over time. Therefore, representatives before 2021 may not represent the same constituency as today. General election results from 2000 to present are as follows:

Year	Candidate	Party	Percent	Opponent	Party	Percent	Opponent	Party	Percent	Write-in percentage
2000	Donna Nelson	Republican	55.18%	Frank Nelson	Democratic	44.82%	No third candidate			
2002	Mary Gallegos	Republican	51.62%	Chuck Riley	Democratic	48.36%	No third candidate			0.02%
2004	Chuck Riley	Democratic	48.39%	Mary Gallegos	Republican	42.09%	Tom Cox	Libertarian	9.52%	
2006	Chuck Riley	Democratic	51.70%	Terry Rilling	Republican	43.08%	Scott Harwood	Libertarian	4.99%	0.22%
2008	Chuck Riley	Democratic	59.98%	Terry Rilling	Independent	39.24%	No third candidate			0.78%
2010	Katie Eyre	Republican	52.95%	Katie Riley	Democratic	46.81%	No third candidate			0.24%
2012	Ben Unger	Democratic	53.46%	Katie Eyre	Republican	46.26%	No third candidate			0.28%
2014	Susan McLain	Democratic	53.74%	Mark Richman	Republican	45.86%	No third candidate			0.40%
2016	Susan McLain	Democratic	58.95%	Juanita Lint	Republican	40.68%	No third candidate			0.37%
2018	Susan McLain	Democratic	58.62%	David Molina	Republican	39.36%	William Namestnik	Libertarian	1.90%	0.12%
2020	Susan McLain	Democratic	57.78%	Dale Fishback	Republican	42.01%	No third candidate			0.21%
2022	Susan McLain	Democratic	53.57%	Gina Munster-Moore	Republican	46.29%	No third candidate			0.14%
2024	Susan McLain	Democratic	96.4%	Unopposed						3.6%

== See also ==
- Oregon Legislative Assembly
- Oregon House of Representatives
