= Lamar Wise =

American politician

Member of the Oregon House of Representatives from the 48th district
- Incumbent
- Assumed office November 5, 2025
- Preceded by: Hòa Nguyễn

Personal details
- Party: Democratic
- Education: University of Oregon

Lamar Wise is an American organizer and politician from Portland serving as a member of the Oregon House of Representatives from the 48th district. He was appointed to succeed the late Rep. Hòa Nguyễn on November 5, 2025.

== Career ==
Wise served as the legislative director and executive director of the Oregon Student Association before moving on to become the political director at AFSCME Oregon Council 75. He has also served on the Higher Education Coordinating Commission and the City of Portland's Independent District Commission, which drew the maps for Portland's 2024 City Council election.

== Politics ==
Wise previously sought appointment to the Oregon State Senate in District 15 based in Hillsboro upon the retirement of Sen. Chuck Riley in 2021, losing out to then-Rep. Janeen Sollman by a 4–1 vote of the Washington County Commission. He then sought appointment to the vacant seat in House District 30, but was defeated by Nathan Sosa.

Wise announced his intent to seek appointment to the State House in House District 48 on October 22, 2025. He won appointment to the seat against José Gamero-Georgeson, member of the David Douglas School Board, and Terrence Hayes, former candidate for Portland City Council in District 1 and small business owner, in a vote of the Multnomah and Clackamas County Commissions. Wise won the vote of 4 out of the 5 Multnomah County commissioners, whose votes were weighted more heavily due to the district's population distribution.

The Oregon Government Ethics Commission (OGEC) voted 8-0 in favor of opening an ethics investigation on Lamar for failure to disclose sources of income on his Statement of Economic Interest (SEI) form. According to the Capital Chronicle, Wise allegedly failed to report $25,000 in a stipend from the group in his 2026 statement of economic interest to the commission. That omission alone may not have violated Oregon law because it wasn’t enough to cross the 10% threshold of total household income, he said. But a representative from the committee noted that Wise appears to have violated an Oregon law requiring him to list the group in another section of the disclosures form where he did not include it, and where public officials are asked to list income from groups that could have a legislative or administrative interest in an official’s role.
