= Holvey =

Holvey is a surname. Notable people with the surname include:

- Annabel Morris Holvey (1855–1910), American newspaper editor, social reformer
- Bill Holvey, the Alliance candidate for Otago in the 1999 New Zealand general election.
- Paul Holvey (born 1954), Democratic Party candidate in the 2006 Oregon primary election.
- Samantha Holvey, a beauty queen who has competed in the Miss USA pageant.
- Thomas Holvey, a Liberal Democrat politician in the United Kingdom who stood in Selby and Ainsty in the 2010 general election. More latterly the Chief Economic Advisor to the Government of Jersey.

== Other ==
- A fictional Holvey family which appeared in "The Calusari", the twenty-first episode of the second season of The X-Files.
