= Pete Belcastro =

American broadcaster

Pete Belcastro is a longtime American television and radio personality who has worked as a sports commentator, news anchor and reporter and is running for political office. He is the former director at Rogue Valley Community Television and was football and basketball commentator for the Southern Oregon University on local radio. He resides in Ashland, Oregon.

== Broadcasting career ==
Belcastro spent time as a commentator, news anchor and reporter at KTVL Channel 10, a CBS television affiliate in Medford, Oregon before accepting a position as director of Rogue Valley Community Television, a Public-access television station based at Southern Oregon University in Ashland in 1989. While holding that position, he served as the play-by-play voice of the Southern Oregon University Raiders football, women's basketball and men's basketball teams for KTMT.

In 2004, he was the recipient of Ashland's James M. Ragland Memorial "Volunteer Spirit" Community Service Award, given to one citizen each year for making significant contributions to the community.

On August 9, 2007, Belcastro resigned as director at RVTV when his contract was not renewed. He works at John L. Scott Realty in Ashland.

== Political aspirations ==
Belcastro announced that he would be running for the Oregon State Representative seat in House District 5 as a member of the Independent Party. The seat was held at the time by Democratic incumbent Peter Buckley of Ashland.

== Electoral history ==
2008 Oregon State Representative, 5th district
Party	Candidate	Votes	%
Democratic	Peter Buckley	18,452	61.1
Independent	Pete Belcastro	11,653	38.6
Write-in		97	0.3
Total votes		30,202	100%

== Personal ==
Belcastro married Christine Ann Beeson, a long-time reporter/editor for the daily newspaper Herald and News, on April 22, 1978, in Klamath Falls, Ore. The couple has one son, Mark Richard, born Feb. 20, 1980. Mark Belcastro was one of the first U.S. Marines to enter Baghdad during the Iraqi Freedom campaign in April, 2003. Pete Belcastro was born Jan. 23, 1952, in Yreka, Calif., to Elmer and Jennie Belcastro. He has two sisters, Frances and Donna, both of whom continue to live in Klamath Falls.
