= Oregon's 53rd House district =

Legislative districts in the state of Oregon

Oregon's 53rd House district after redistricting after the 2020 Census

District 53 of the Oregon House of Representatives is one of 60 House legislative districts in the state of Oregon. As of 2021, the district is contained entirely within Deschutes County and includes the cities of Redmond, Oregon, Sisters, and Tumalo as well as northern parts of Bend and the Redmond Municipal Airport. The current representative for the district is Democrat Emerson Levy of Redmond.

== Election results ==
District boundaries have changed over time. Therefore, representatives before 2021 may not represent the same constituency as today. General election results from 2000 to present are as follows:

Year	Candidate	Party	Percent	Opponent	Party	Percent	Opponent	Party	Percent	Write-in percentage
2000	Bill Garrard	Republican	56.54%	Wayne Snoozy	Democratic	43.46%	No third candidate			
2002 (Note: Ben Westlund was the incumbent in this election. He previously represented District 55, but was moved to this district due to redistricting following the 2000 United States census.)	Ben Westlund	Republican	65.96%	Cylvia Hayes	Democratic	30.54%	Curt Wagoner	Libertarian	3.50%	
2004 (Note: Gene Whisnant was the incumbent in this election. He was appointed to this seat on September 3, 2003 to replace Ben Westlund, who resigned to take an appointment to the 27th district seat in the Oregon Senate.)	Gene Whisnant	Republican	83.53%	Mark Francis	Constitution	15.39%	No third candidate			1.08%
2006	Gene Whisnant	Republican	59.11%	Bill Smith	Democratic	40.78%	No third candidate			0.11%
2008	Gene Whisnant	Republican	67.13%	Conrad Ruel	Democratic	32.72%	No third candidate			0.15%
2010	Gene Whisnant	Republican	72.82%	John Huddle	Democratic	27.01%	No third candidate			0.17%
2012	Gene Whisnant	Republican	97.92%	Unopposed						2.08%
2014	Gene Whisnant	Republican	97.67%	Unopposed						2.33%
2016	Gene Whisnant	Republican	67.45%	Michael Graham	Democratic	32.38%	No third candidate			0.17%
2018	Jack Zika	Republican	56.44%	Eileen Kiely	Democratic	43.42%	No third candidate			0.14%
2020	Jack Zika	Republican	57.10%	Emerson Levy	Democratic	42.80%	No third candidate			0.10%
2022	Emerson Levy	Democratic	50.61%	Michael Sipe	Republican	49.30%	No third candidate			0.89%
2024	Emerson Levy	Democratic	54.2%	Keri Lopez	Republican	45.6%	No third candidate			0.1%

== See also ==
- Oregon Legislative Assembly
- Oregon House of Representatives
