= Oregon's 5th House district =

Legislative districts in the state of Oregon

Oregon's 5th House district after redistricting after the 2020 Census

District 5 of the Oregon House of Representatives is one of 60 House legislative districts in the state of Oregon. As of 2021, the district is contained entirely within southern Jackson County and includes Ashland, Jacksonville, Phoenix, and Talent, Oregon as well as parts of Medford and the campus of Southern Oregon University. The current representative for the district is Democrat Pam Marsh of Ashland.

== Election results ==
District boundaries have changed over time. Therefore, representatives before 2021 may not represent the same constituency as today. General election results from 2000 to present are as follows:

Year	Candidate	Party	Percent	Opponent	Party	Percent	Write-in percentage
2000	Jim Hill	Republican	51.14%	James Draznin	Democratic	48.86%	
2002 (Note: Alan Bates was the incumbent in this election. He previously represented District 52, but was moved to this district due to redistricting following the 2000 United States census.)	Alan Bates	Democratic	95.91%	Unopposed			4.09%
2004	Peter Buckley	Democratic	60.38%	Joanna Lofaso	Republican	39.62%	
2006	Peter Buckley	Democratic	97.49%	Unopposed			2.51%
2008	Peter Buckley	Democratic	61.10%	Pete Belcastro	Independent	38.58%	0.32%
2010	Peter Buckley	Democratic	62.50%	Sandra Abercrombie	Republican	37.32%	0.19%
2012	Peter Buckley	Democratic	66.33%	Sandra Abercrombie	Republican	33.52%	0.16%
2014	Peter Buckley	Democratic	64.10%	Nick Card	Republican	35.72%	0.18%
2016	Pam Marsh	Democratic	62.72%	Steven Richie	Republican	37.03%	0.25%
2018	Pam Marsh	Democratic	67.98%	Sandra Abercrombie	Republican	31.94%	0.08%
2020	Pam Marsh	Democratic	66.36%	Sandra Abercrombie	Republican	33.53%	0.12%
2022	Pam Marsh	Democratic	64.36%	Sandra Abercrombie	Republican	35.55%	0.08%
2024	Pam Marsh	Democratic	64.1%	Katherine Green	Republican	35.8%	0.1%

== See also ==
- Oregon Legislative Assembly
- Oregon House of Representatives
