= Oregon's 7th House district =

Legislative districts in the state of Oregon

Oregon's 7th House district after redistricting after the 2020 Census

District 7 of the Oregon House of Representatives is one of 60 House legislative districts in the state of Oregon. As of 2021, the boundary for the district is entirely in Lane County and entirely envelops the city of Springfield. The current representative for the district is Democrat John Lively of Springfield. Lively announced his retirement on November 3, 2025.

== Election results ==
District boundaries have changed over time. Therefore, representatives before 2021 may not represent the same constituency as today. General election results from 2000 to present are as follows:

Year	Candidate	Party	Percent	Opponent	Party	Percent	Opponent	Party	Percent	Write-in percentage
2000	Bill Witt	Republican	50.80%	Mitch Greenlick	Democratic	49.20%	No third candidate			
2002 (Note: Jeff Kruse was the incumbent in this election. He previously represented District 45, but was moved to this district due to redistricting following the 2000 United States census.)	Jeff Kruse	Republican	65.51%	Donald Nordin	Democratic	34.26%	No third candidate			0.23%
2004 (Note: Bruce Hanna was the incumbent in this election. He was appointed to this seat on March 30, 2004 to replace Jeff Kruse, who resigned from office to run for the District 1 seat in the Oregon Senate.)	Bruce Hanna	Republican	62.31%	Shirley Cairns	Democratic	37.69%	No third candidate			
2006	Bruce Hanna	Republican	98.63%	Unopposed						1.37%
2008	Bruce Hanna	Republican	63.71%	Donald Nordin	Democratic	36.01%	No third candidate			0.28%
2010	Bruce Hanna	Republican	64.55%	Sara Byers	Democratic	35.17%	No third candidate			0.28%
2012	Bruce Hanna	Republican	69.18%	Fergus McLean	Democratic	30.53%	No third candidate			0.28%
2014	Cedric Ross Hayden	Republican	79.70%	Brandon Boertje	Libertarian	17.76%	No third candidate			2.54%
2016	Cedric Ross Hayden	Republican	65.35%	Vincent Portulano	Democratic	23.80%	Fergus McLean	Independent	10.60%	0.25%
2018	Cedric Ross Hayden	Republican	60.83%	Christy Inskip	Democratic	38.89%	No third candidate			0.28%
2020	Cedric Ross Hayden	Republican	67.76%	Jerry M. Samaniego	Democratic	32.05%	No third candidate			0.19%
2022 (Note: John Lively was the incumbent in this election. He previously represented District 12, but was moved to this district due to redistricting following the 2020 United States census.)	John Lively	Democratic	51.80%	Alan Stout	Republican	47.68%	No third candidate			0.69%
2024	John Lively	Democratic	55.8%	Cory Burket	Republican	44.0%	No third candidate			0.2%

== See also ==
- Oregon Legislative Assembly
- Oregon House of Representatives
