= Oregon's 48th House district =

Legislative districts in the state of Oregon

Oregon's 48th House district after redistricting after the 2020 Census

District 48 of the Oregon House of Representatives is one of 60 House legislative districts in the state of Oregon. As of 2021, the boundary for the district contains portions of Clackamas and Multnomah counties. The district includes areas of outer southeast Portland surrounding Powell Butte as well as parts of Barton, Boring, Damascus, and Happy Valley. The current representative is Lamar Wise of Portland.

== Election results ==
District boundaries have changed over time. Therefore, representatives before 2021 may not represent the same constituency as today. General election results from 2000 to present are as follows:

Year	Candidate	Party	Percent	Opponent	Party	Percent	Opponent	Party	Percent	Opponent	Party	Percent	Write-in percentage
2000	Wayne Krieger	Republican	55.73%	Barbara Dodrill	Democratic	44.27%	No third candidate			No fourth candidate			
2002	Mike Schaufler	Democratic	54.16%	Michael Wrathell	Republican	39.30%	Jeremy Bowen	Constitution	5.69%	No fourth candidate			0.85%
2004	Mike Schaufler	Democratic	51.48%	Dave Mowry	Republican	48.52%	No third candidate			No fourth candidate			
2006	Mike Schaufler	Democratic	74.26%	Bill Stallings	Constitution	24.22%	No third candidate			No fourth candidate			1.52%
2008	Mike Schaufler	Democratic	95.75%	Unopposed									4.25%
2010	Mike Schaufler	Democratic	56.84%	Kayla Fioravanti	Republican	42.43%	Jeff Caton	Independent	0.73%	No fourth candidate			
2012	Jeff Reardon	Democratic	68.75%	Sonny Yellott	Republican	30.79%	No third candidate			No fourth candidate			0.46%
2014	Jeff Reardon	Democratic	67.19%	Sonny Yellott	Republican	31.92%	No third candidate			No fourth candidate			0.89%
2016	Jeff Reardon	Democratic	62.92%	Sonny Yellott	Republican	28.13%	Gary Lyndon Dye	Libertarian	4.69%	Timothy Crawley	(Note: Timothy Crawley ran with no party affiliation in this election.)	3.97%	0.29%
2018	Jeff Reardon	Democratic	69.36%	Sonny Yellott	Republican	30.22%	No third candidate			No fourth candidate			0.42%
2020	Jeff Reardon	Democratic	75.68%	Edward Marihart	Libertarian	22.32%	No third candidate			No fourth candidate			2.00%
2022	Hoa Nguyen	Democratic	51.24%	John Masterman	Republican	48.68%	No third candidate			No fourth candidate			0.08%
2024	Hoa Nguyen	Democratic	52.9%	John Masterman	Republican	46.8%	No third candidate			No fourth candidate			0.3%

== See also ==
- Oregon Legislative Assembly
- Oregon House of Representatives
