= Brad Witt =

American Democratic politician

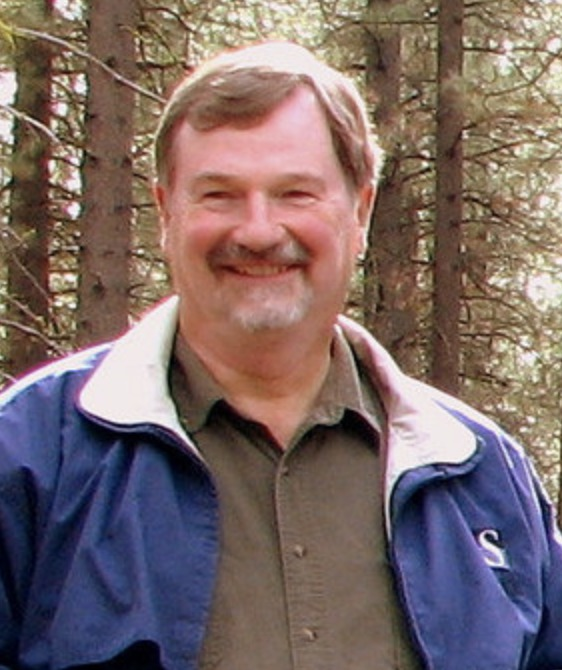

Member of the Oregon House of Representatives from the 31st district
- In office 2005 – January 9, 2023
- Preceded by: Betsy Johnson
- Succeeded by: Brian Stout

Personal details
- Born: 1952 (age 73–74) Ware, Massachusetts
- Party: Democratic
- Education: University of Massachusetts Amherst, University of Oregon
- Occupation: union official
- Brad Witt's voice Witt in an interview before the 2020 Oregon House of Representatives election Recorded April 20, 2020

Bradley Witt (born 1952) is an American Democratic politician who served in the Oregon House of Representatives for District 31 from 2005 to 2023, representing most of Columbia and parts of Clatsop and Multnomah counties.

Witt was a candidate for the Democratic nomination for the special election in Oregon's 1st congressional district to replace David Wu, who resigned from Congress before the end of his term due to allegations of sexual misconduct. Witt lost in the Democratic primary to state senator Suzanne Bonamici.

== Electoral history ==
2006 Oregon State Representative, 31st district
Party	Candidate	Votes	%
Democratic	Brad Witt	13,975	58.7
Republican	Mike Kocher	6,955	29.2
Constitution	Bob Ekström	2,802	11.8
Write-in		62	0.3
Total votes		23,794	100%

2008 Oregon State Representative, 31st district
Party	Candidate	Votes	%
Democratic	Brad Witt	20,499	96.3
Write-in		786	3.7
Total votes		21,285	100%

2010 Oregon State Representative, 31st district
Party	Candidate	Votes	%
Democratic	Brad Witt	13,804	57.1
Republican	Ed DeCoste	10,300	42.6
Write-in		91	0.4
Total votes		24,195	100%

2012 Oregon State Representative, 31st district
Party	Candidate	Votes	%
Democratic	Brad Witt	15,650	53.2
Republican	Lew Barnes	12,262	41.7
Constitution	Ray Biggs	782	2.7
Libertarian	Robert Miller	665	2.3
Write-in		44	0.1
Total votes		29,403	100%

2014 Oregon State Representative, 31st district
Party	Candidate	Votes	%
Democratic	Brad Witt	13,633	54.4
Republican	Larry C Ericksen	10,224	40.8
Libertarian	Robert Miller	1,086	4.3
Write-in		96	0.4
Total votes		25,039	100%

2016 Oregon State Representative, 31st district
Party	Candidate	Votes	%
Democratic	Brad Witt	25,003	80.5
Libertarian	Robert Miller	5,812	18.7
Write-in		252	0.8
Total votes		31,067	100%

2018 Oregon State Representative, 31st district
Party	Candidate	Votes	%
Democratic	Brad Witt	17,491	53.9
Republican	Brian G Stout	14,870	45.8
Write-in		73	0.2
Total votes		32,434	100%

2020 Oregon State Representative, 31st district
Party	Candidate	Votes	%
Democratic	Brad Witt	21,536	50.5
Republican	Brian G Stout	21,025	49.3
Write-in		59	0.1
Total votes		42,620	100%
