= John Lively (politician) =

American politician (born 1946)

Member of the Oregon House of Representatives from the 7th district
- Incumbent
- Assumed office January 9, 2023
- Preceded by: Cedric Ross Hayden

Member of the Oregon House of Representatives from the 12th district
- In office January 14, 2013 – January 9, 2023
- Preceded by: Terry Beyer
- Succeeded by: Charlie Conrad

Personal details
- Born: November 30, 1946 (age 79) La Grande, Oregon, U.S.
- Party: Democratic
- Education: Lane Community College; University of Oregon
- Website: electjohnlively.com

John Douglas Lively (born November 30, 1946) is an American politician and a Democratic member of the Oregon House of Representatives representing District 12 since January 14, 2013. Lively was the mayor of Springfield, Oregon, and a member of its city council from 1977 until 1986.

== Education ==
Lively was born on November 30, 1946, in La Grande, Oregon. He graduated from Thurston High School, Lane Community College and the University of Oregon.

== Elections ==
In 2012, When Democratic Representative Terry Beyer retired and left the District 12 seat open, Lively won the May 15, 2012, Democratic primary with 2,688 votes (66.4%), and won the November 6, 2012, general election with 12,213 votes (53.7%) against Republican nominee Joe Pishioneri. He was reelected to the 12th district against Republican Christopher P. Gergen in the 2014 Oregon House of Representatives election. He was reelected in the 2016 Oregon House of Representatives election against Republican Robert Schwartz. He was reelected in the 2018 Oregon House of Representatives election against Republican Ruth Linoz. He was elected to the 7th district in the 2022 Oregon House of Representatives election against Republican Alan Stout due to redistricting. Lively announced that he will be retiring from the Oregon House on November 3, 2025.

== Electoral history ==
2012 Oregon State Representative, 12th district
Party	Candidate	Votes	%
Democratic	John Lively	12,213	53.7
Republican	Joe Pishioneri	10,442	45.9
Write-in		73	0.3
Total votes		22,728	100%

2014 Oregon State Representative, 12th district
Party	Candidate	Votes	%
Democratic	John Lively	12,445	64.3
Republican	Christopher P Gergen	6,823	35.3
Write-in		78	0.4
Total votes		19,346	100%

2016 Oregon State Representative, 12th district
Party	Candidate	Votes	%
Democratic	John Lively	16,237	62.3
Republican	Robert Schwartz	9,742	37.4
Write-in		96	0.4
Total votes		26,075	100%

2018 Oregon State Representative, 12th district
Party	Candidate	Votes	%
Democratic	John Lively	16,388	95.2
Write-in		820	4.8
Total votes		17,208	100%

2020 Oregon State Representative, 12th district
Party	Candidate	Votes	%
Democratic	John Lively	18,227	56.6
Republican	Ruth E Linoz	13,883	43.1
Write-in		90	0.3
Total votes		32,200	100%

2022 Oregon State Representative, 7th district
Party	Candidate	Votes	%
Democratic	John Lively	15,141	51.7
Republican	Alan Stout	13,934	47.6
Write-in		202	0.7
Total votes		29,277	100%

2024 Oregon State Representative, 7th district
Party	Candidate	Votes	%
Democratic	John Lively	18,868	55.8
Republican	Cory Burket	14,888	44.0
Write-in		59	0.2
Total votes		33,815	100%
