= Gene Whisnant =

American politician (born 1943)

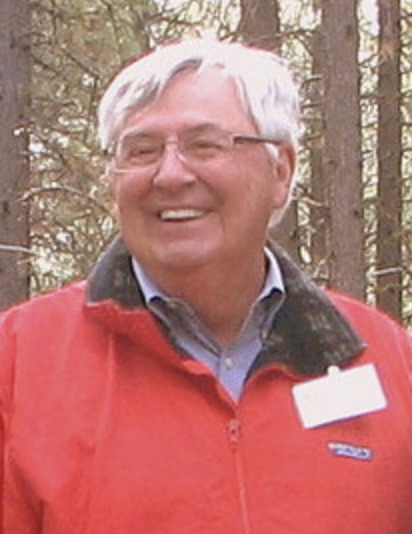

Member of the Oregon House of Representatives from the 53rd district
- In office January 2003 – January 14, 2019
- Preceded by: Ben Westlund
- Succeeded by: Jack Zika

Personal details
- Born: Cleatus Gene Whisnant; December 8, 1943 (age 82) Caroleen, North Carolina, U.S.
- Party: Republican
- Spouse: Josie Whisnant
- Children: 1
- Education: University of North Carolina, Chapel Hill (BA); University of Arkansas, Fayetteville (MA)

Cleatus Gene Whisnant (born December 8, 1943) is a Republican politician from the US state of Oregon. He served in the Oregon House of Representatives representing District 53, which encompasses most of Deschutes County, including the cities of Redmond and Sisters, and portions of the city of Bend.

== Early life and military career ==
Whisnant was born Cleatus Gene Whisnant in North Carolina, and attended West Mecklenburg High School in Charlotte, later graduating from the University of North Carolina at Chapel Hill in 1966 with a bachelor's degree in journalism. He later received a master's degree in international affairs from the University of Arkansas in 1976.

In 1966, Whisnant was commissioned to the United States Air Force from the Air Force Reserve Officer Training Corps, attending Air Command and Staff College and National Defense University. He served in the Vietnam War, where he flew 32 missions as a combat cameraman. Whisnant also served on American bases in Germany and Yugoslavia, where he served in various command and staff positions before his retirement as a colonel in the early 1990s.

== Political career ==
Following his retirement from the military, Whisnant moved to Oregon and became involved in politics in Deschutes County, serving as the treasurer and later chairman of the Deschutes County Republican Party. In 2003, he was appointed to fill the vacant seat in the Oregon House of Representatives created when Ben Westlund was appointed to a seat in the Oregon Senate. and has been re-elected four times, most recently in 2010. He served as the deputy Republican whip and was Republican whip in 2007.

Whisnant is a member of the American Legislative Exchange Council (ALEC), serving as Oregon state leader. In August 2011, he was given ALEC's 2011 Legislator of the Year Award. His support and advocacy in animal-related measures saw him labeled as a 2011 "Top Dog" by the Oregon Humane Society.

== Personal life ==
Whisnant's wife is Josie Whisnant. They have one son. Whisnant and his family live in Sunriver.

== Electoral history ==
2004 Oregon State Representative, 53rd district
Party	Candidate	Votes	%
Republican	Gene Whisnant	25,106	83.5
Constitution	Mark M. Francis	4,624	15.4
Write-in		325	1.1
Total votes		30,055	100%

2006 Oregon State Representative, 53rd district
Party	Candidate	Votes	%
Republican	Gene Whisnant	16,527	59.1
Democratic	Bill A. Smith	11,406	40.8
Write-in		31	0.1
Total votes		27,964	100%

2008 Oregon State Representative, 53rd district
Party	Candidate	Votes	%
Republican	Gene Whisnant	22,058	67.1
Democratic	Conrad Ruel	10,753	32.7
Write-in		50	0.2
Total votes		32,861	100%

2010 Oregon State Representative, 53rd district
Party	Candidate	Votes	%
Republican	Gene Whisnant	21,532	72.8
Democratic	John Huddle	8,012	27.1
Write-in		52	0.2
Total votes		29,596	100%

2012 Oregon State Representative, 53rd district
Party	Candidate	Votes	%
Republican	Gene Whisnant	21,675	97.9
Write-in		460	2.1
Total votes		22,135	100%

2014 Oregon State Representative, 53rd district
Party	Candidate	Votes	%
Republican	Gene Whisnant	20,173	97.7
Write-in		482	2.3
Total votes		20,655	100%

2016 Oregon State Representative, 53rd district
Party	Candidate	Votes	%
Republican	Gene Whisnant	24,425	67.5
Democratic	Michael Graham	11,727	32.4
Write-in		60	0.2
Total votes		36,212	100%
