= Darin Harbick =

American politician

Member of the Oregon House of Representatives from the 12th district
- Incumbent
- Assumed office January 13, 2025
- Preceded by: Charlie Conrad

Personal details
- Party: Republican

Darin Harbick is an American Republican politician currently serving in the Oregon House of Representatives. He represents the 12th district, which is a rural district comprising eastern Lane County as well as a small part of southern Linn County.

== Biography ==
Harbick defeated incumbent representative Charlie Conrad in the primary, winning over 80% of the vote. The vote was widely seen as a reaction to Conrad's vote in favor of HB 2002, a bill expanding access to abortion and gender-affirming care.

He is an entrepreneur and small business owner in his hometown of McKenzie Bridge, having owned a grocery store, a restaurant, a hotel, a logging and trucking company, and a faith-based residential treatment home over the course of the last 30 years.

== Electoral history ==
2024 Oregon State Representative, 12th district
Party	Candidate	Votes	%
Republican	Darin Harbick	23,256	57.7
Democratic	Michelle Emmons	17,012	42.2
Write-in		62	0.2
Total votes		40,330	100%
