= Susan McLain =

American politician

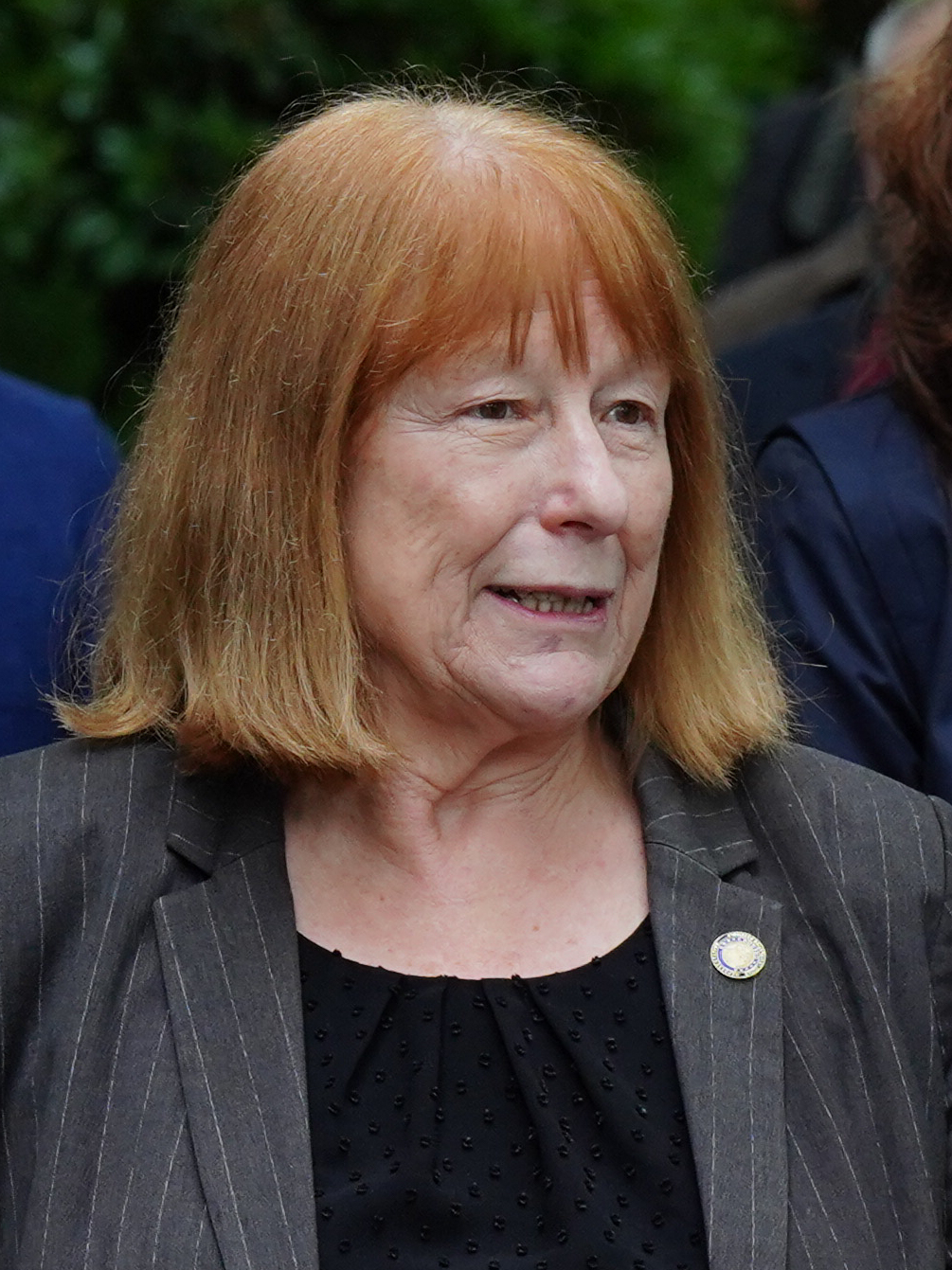

Member of the Oregon House of Representatives from the 29th district
- Incumbent
- Assumed office January 12, 2015
- Preceded by: Ben Unger

Member of the Metro Council
- In office 1991–2007

Personal details
- Born: 1948 or 1949 (age 77–78)
- Party: Democratic
- Education: Western Oregon University (BS)
- Profession: politician, teacher

Susan McLain is an American politician. A Democrat, she currently serves as a member of the Oregon House of Representatives from District 29, representing Cornelius, Forest Grove, and parts of Hillsboro. She served as a councilor for Metro, the regional government covering the urban portions of Clackamas, Multnomah, and Washington counties, for 16 years, first winning election in 1990. She was an unsuccessful candidate for Washington County commissioner in 2006. She was elected to the Oregon House of Representatives in 2014, defeating Republican Mark Richman.

== Personal life ==
McLain earned a Bachelor of Science degree in teaching from the Oregon College of Education (known as Western Oregon University since April 22, 1981) in 1971. She retired in June 2014 from Glencoe High School, where she started teaching in 1980, the year the school opened. Prior to that, McLain taught at Hillsboro High School, from 1975–1980. Both schools are in the Hillsboro School District.

In 2011, McLain was awarded the Hillsboro School District's Crystal Apple Award for excellence in education. She continues to coach Glencoe High School's Speech and Debate team in her retirement.

McLain is widowed, with four children and five grandchildren. Although she taught in Hillsboro, she lives in Forest Grove with her family and attends church in Cornelius, other communities in her House district.

== Political career ==
McLain was elected to the Oregon House of Representatives in November 2014, representing House District 29. She was sworn into the House on January 12, 2015, and appointed by House Speaker Tina Kotek to serve on four committees: the House Committee on Transportation and Economic Development, the House Committee on Education, the House Committee on Consumer Protection and Government Effectiveness, and as the Vice-Chair of the House Committee on Agriculture and Natural Resources.

== Electoral history ==
2014 Oregon State Representative, 29th district
Party	Candidate	Votes	%
Democratic	Susan McLain	9,751	53.7
Republican	Mark Richman	8,321	45.9
Write-in		73	0.4
Total votes		18,145	100%

2016 Oregon State Representative, 29th district
Party	Candidate	Votes	%
Democratic	Susan McLain	14,248	58.9
Republican	Juanita Lint	9,833	40.7
Write-in		90	0.4
Total votes		24,171	100%

2018 Oregon State Representative, 29th district
Party	Candidate	Votes	%
Democratic	Susan McLain	13,652	58.6
Republican	David Molina	9,166	39.4
Libertarian	William A Namestnik	442	1.9
Write-in		28	0.1
Total votes		23,288	100%

2020 Oregon State Representative, 29th district
Party	Candidate	Votes	%
Democratic	Susan McLain	17,200	57.8
Republican	Dale Fishback	12,507	42.0
Write-in		63	0.2
Total votes		29,770	100%

2022 Oregon State Representative, 29th district
Party	Candidate	Votes	%
Democratic	Susan McLain	13,592	53.6
Republican	Gina Munster-Moore	11,746	46.3
Write-in		35	0.1
Total votes		25,373	100%

2024 Oregon State Representative, 29th district
Party	Candidate	Votes	%
Democratic	Susan McLain	20,176	96.4
Write-in		758	3.6
Total votes		20,934	100%
