= Ben Unger =

American politician

Member of the Oregon House of Representatives from the 29th district
- In office January 14, 2013 – January 12, 2015
- Preceded by: Katerina Brewer
- Succeeded by: Susan McLain

Personal details
- Born: March 4, 1976 (age 50) Cornelius, Oregon
- Party: Democratic
- Education: University of Oregon
- Website: 2013 archived copy

Benjamin 'Ben' Unger (born March 4, 1976, in Cornelius, Oregon) is an American politician and a Democratic member of the Oregon House of Representatives representing District 29 from 2013 to 2015. He stands at over 6'7".

== Early life ==
Unger was born on March 4, 1976, in Cornelius, Oregon, and was raised on a farm south of the city. After graduating from Hillsboro High School in 1994, Unger earned his BA degree in English from the University of Oregon. Prior to entering politics, he worked as a special assistant to the Oregon Attorney General.

== Political career ==
In 2012, Unger won the District 29 Democratic Primary with 65.2% of the vote against Katie Riley. He won the November 6 General election with 11,312 votes (53.5%) against Republican nominee Katie Eyre. Unger was endorsed by a local newspaper, the Forest Grove News Times, and many other groups such as the Oregon Council of Police Associations, the Oregon State Council of Retired Citizens, and the Oregon League of Conservation Voters. During his run against Eyre, he was portrayed as a carpetbagger for moving back to the district from Portland to run for the seat. The Forest Grove News Times ran an article pointing out inaccuracies in those attacks, and referenced them as one of the reasons they chose to endorse Unger. Unger, who grew up on his families' Century Farm, emphasized supporting local schools in his campaign.

In 2014, he announced he would not run for re-election, and in June 2014 became the executive director of lobby group Our Oregon, where he served until 2018. Unger was succeeded by former Metro councilor Susan McLain, also a Democrat.

== Electoral history ==
2012 Oregon State Representative, 29th district
Party	Candidate	Votes	%
Democratic	Ben Unger	11,312	53.5
Republican	Katie Eyre	9,788	46.3
Write-in		60	0.3
Total votes		21,160	100%
