= Oregon's 31st House district =

Legislative districts in the state of Oregon

Oregon's 31st House district after redistricting after the 2020 Census

District 31 of the Oregon House of Representatives is one of 60 House legislative districts in the state of Oregon. As of 2021, the boundary for the district contains portions of Columbia County, Multnomah and Washington counties. The district includes Banks, Columbia City, North Plains, Scappoose, St. Helens, and Vernonia as well as Sauvie Island. The current representative for the district is Republican Darcey Edwards.

== Election results ==
District boundaries have changed over time. Therefore, representatives before 2021 may not represent the same constituency as today. General election results from 2000 to present are as follows:

Year	Candidate	Party	Percent	Opponent	Party	Percent	Opponent	Party	Percent	Opponent	Party	Percent	Write-in percentage
2000	Jackie Winters	Republican	63.14%	Lloyd Kumley	Democratic	36.86%	No third candidate			No fourth candidate			
2002 (Note: Betsy Johnson was the incumbent in the 2001 election. She previously represented District 1, but was moved to this district due to redistricting following the 2000 United States census.)	Betsy Johnson	Democratic	66.58%	Bob Ekstrom	Constitution	23.92%	Mervin Arnold	Independent	9.00%	No fourth candidate			0.50%
2004	Betsy Johnson	Democratic	76.10%	Ron Ross	Constitution	23.11%	No third candidate			No fourth candidate			0.79%
2006 (Note: Brad Witt was the incumbent in the 2005 election. He was appointed to this seat on January 26, 2005 to replace Betsy Johnson, who resigned to take an appointment to the 16th district seat in the Oregon Senate.)	Brad Witt	Democratic	58.78%	Michael Kocher	Republican	29.19%	Bob Ekstrom	Constitution	11.78%	No fourth candidate			0.25%
2008	Brad Witt	Democratic	96.31%	Unopposed									3.69%
2010	Brad Witt	Democratic	57.03%	Ed DeCoste	Republican	42.59%	No third candidate			No fourth candidate			0.37%
2012	Brad Witt	Democratic	53.23%	Lew Barnes	Republican	41.70%	Ray Biggs	Constitution	2.66%	Robert Miller	Libertarian	2.26%	0.15%
2014	Brad Witt	Democratic	54.45%	Larry Ericksen	Republican	40.83%	Robert Miller	Libertarian	4.34%	No fourth candidate			0.38%
2016	Brad Witt	Democratic	80.48%	Robert Miller	Libertarian	18.71%	No third candidate			No fourth candidate			0.81%
2018	Brad Witt	Democratic	53.93%	Brian Stout	Republican	45.85%	No third candidate			No fourth candidate			0.23%
2020	Brad Witt	Democratic	50.53%	Brian Stout	Republican	49.33%	No third candidate			No fourth candidate			0.14%
2022	Brian Stout	Republican	59.31%	Anthony Sorace	Democrat	40.48%	No third candidate			No fourth candidate			0.21%
2024	Darcey Edwards	Republican	59.05%	Jordan Gutierrez	Democrat	37.30%	Robert Miller	Libertarian	3.42%	No fourth candidate			0.23%

== 2024 election ==
On February 8, 2024, Representative Brian Stout announced that he would not be running for re-election. He endorsed Darcey Edwards. Republican Drew Layda and Democrat Jordan Gutierrez have also announced campaigns. The filing deadline for the election was March 12, 2024.

Each political party choose their candidate in the primary election on May 21, 2024. Jordan Gutierrez ran unopposed in and won the nomination for the Democratic Party. Two candidates ran for the republican nomination. Darcy Edwards won then nomination with 81% of the vote. Aaron L. Hall received 18% of the votes.

The general election is on November 5, 2024.

== See also ==
- Oregon Legislative Assembly
- Oregon House of Representatives
