= Jeff Reardon (politician) =

American politician

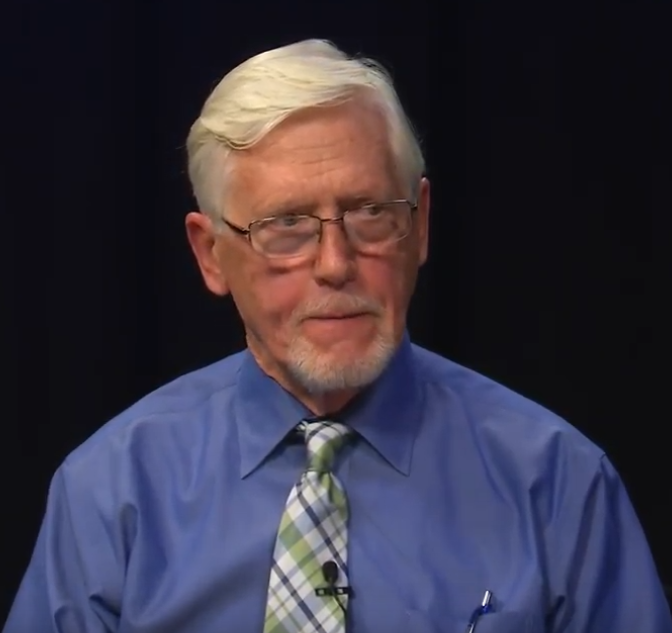

Member of the Oregon House of Representatives from the 48th district
- In office January 14, 2013 – January 9, 2023
- Preceded by: Mike Schaufler
- Succeeded by: Hoa Nguyen

Personal details
- Born: 1947 (age 78–79) Kelso, Washington
- Party: Democratic
- Other political affiliations: Working Families Party
- Education: Western Washington University
- Website: reardonfororegon.com

Military service
- Branch/service: United States Navy
- Rank: Petty officer, second class

Jeff Reardon (born 1947) is an American politician and a member of the Democratic Party who served in the Oregon House of Representatives representing District 48 from 2013 to 2023.

== Education ==
Reardon earned his bachelor's degree in education from Western Washington University.

== Elections ==
In 2012, Reardon challenged incumbent Democratic Representative Mike Schaufler for the District 48 seat in the May 15, 2012, Democratic primary, winning with 2,782 votes (65.7%), and won the November 6, 2012, general election with 13,967 votes (68.8%) against Republican nominee George Yellott.

== Electoral history ==
2012 Oregon State Representative, 48th district
Party	Candidate	Votes	%
Democratic	Jeff Reardon	13,967	68.7
Republican	George (Sonny) Yellott	6,255	30.8
Write-in		94	0.5
Total votes		20,316	100%

2014 Oregon State Representative, 48th district
Party	Candidate	Votes	%
Democratic	Jeff Reardon	10,738	67.2
Republican	Geo (Sonny) W Yellott	5,101	31.9
Write-in		142	0.9
Total votes		15,981	100%

2016 Oregon State Representative, 48th district
Party	Candidate	Votes	%
Democratic	Jeff Reardon	15,154	62.9
Republican	George (Sonny) Yellott	6,774	28.1
Libertarian	Gary Dye	1,130	4.7
Independent	Timothy Crawley	956	4.0
Write-in		69	0.3
Total votes		24,083	100%

2018 Oregon State Representative, 48th district
Party	Candidate	Votes	%
Democratic	Jeff Reardon	16,250	69.4
Republican	Sonny Yellott	7,079	30.2
Write-in		98	0.4
Total votes		23,427	100%

2020 Oregon State Representative, 48th district
Party	Candidate	Votes	%
Democratic	Jeff Reardon	21,328	75.7
Libertarian	Edward Marihart	6,291	22.3
Write-in		564	2.0
Total votes		28,183	100%
