= Pam Marsh =

American politician

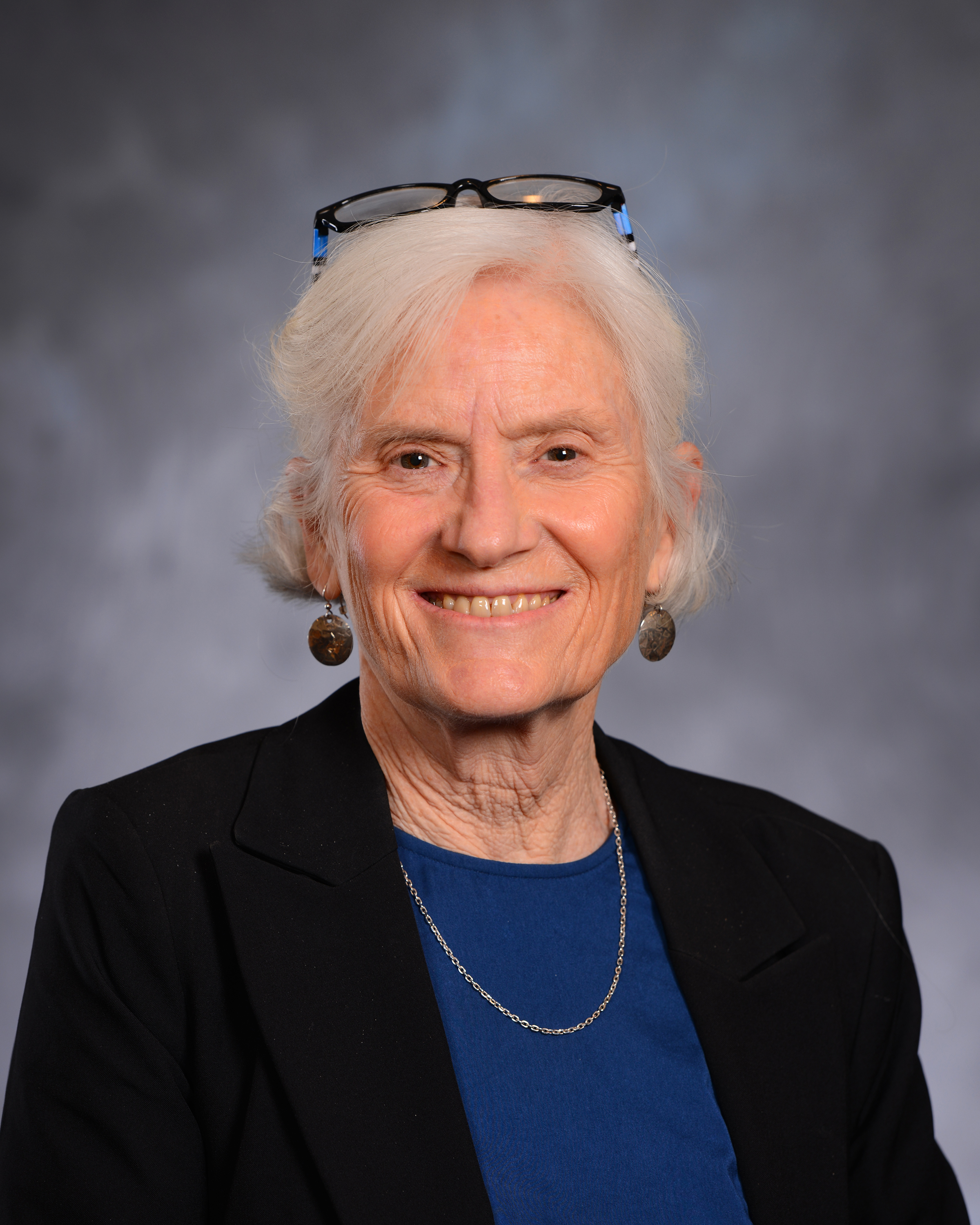

Member of the Oregon House of Representatives from the 5th district
- Incumbent
- Assumed office January 9, 2017
- Preceded by: Peter J. Buckley

Member of the Ashland City Council
- In office December 2012 – January 2017

Personal details
- Born: November 4, 1954 (age 71) St. Louis, Missouri, U.S.
- Party: Democratic
- Spouse: Diarmuid McGuire
- Children: 4
- Education: University of California, Berkeley; Southern Oregon University

Pam Marsh (born November 4, 1954) is an American Democratic politician serving in the Oregon House of Representatives. She represents the 5th district, which covers southern Jackson County, including the city of Ashland.

== Career ==
Marsh attended the University of California, Berkeley from 1973 until 1975, and graduated from Southern Oregon University in 2005. She lived in Palo Alto, California, where she served as field representative for state assemblymember Byron Sher and as city planning commissioner from 1985 until 1993, before moving to Ashland in 1994.

Marsh served as a member of the Ashland Charter Review Commission from 2004 until 2006, and as chair of the Ashland City Planning Commission from 2006 until 2012. She was appointed to the City Council in December 2012, in order to fill a vacancy.

In February 2016, Marsh declared her candidacy for the Oregon House seat vacated by the retiring Peter J. Buckley. She defeated Republican Steven Richie in the general election with 63% of the vote.

== Personal life ==
Marsh and her husband, Diarmuid McGuire, have four children: Kerry, Meghan, Padraic, and Molly. She is religiously unaffiliated.

== Electoral history ==
2016 Oregon State Representative, 5th district
Party	Candidate	Votes	%
Democratic	Pam Marsh	22,480	62.7
Republican	Steven Richie	13,273	37.0
Write-in		88	0.2
Total votes		35,841	100%

2018 Oregon State Representative, 5th district
Party	Candidate	Votes	%
Democratic	Pam Marsh	24,643	68.0
Republican	Sandra A Abercrombie	11,580	31.9
Write-in		28	0.1
Total votes		36,251	100%

2020 Oregon State Representative, 5th district
Party	Candidate	Votes	%
Democratic	Pam Marsh	27,069	66.4
Republican	Sandra A Abercrombie	13,678	33.5
Write-in		47	0.1
Total votes		40,794	100%

2022 Oregon State Representative, 5th district
Party	Candidate	Votes	%
Democratic	Pam Marsh	23,063	64.4
Republican	Sandra A Abercrombie	12,740	35.6
Write-in		29	0.1
Total votes		35,832	100%

2024 Oregon State Representative, 5th district
Party	Candidate	Votes	%
Democratic	Pam Marsh	25,300	64.1
Republican	Katherine Green	14,153	35.8
Write-in		34	0.1
Total votes		39,487	100%

Oregon House of Representatives
Preceded by Peter J. Buckley	Member of the Oregon House of Representatives from the 5th district 2017–	Succeeded by Incumbent
