= Jack Zika =

American politician (born 1977)

Member of the Oregon House of Representatives from the 53rd district
- In office January 14, 2019 – January 9, 2023
- Preceded by: Gene Whisnant
- Succeeded by: Emerson Levy

Personal details
- Born: 1977 (48–49 years old)
- Party: Republican
- Spouse: Zanthel Zika
- Children: 2
- Education: University of Cincinnati
- Profession: Realtor, Politician

Joseph "Jack" Zika III (born 1977) is an American politician from Oregon. A Republican, he served as a member of the Oregon House of Representatives for the 53rd district from 2019 to 2023.

== Early life and career ==
Zika was born in Ohio and attended the University of Cincinnati.

== Career ==
Zika worked as a securities trader and, immediately prior to his election to the Oregon House of Representatives, as a realtor in Bend. He previously served on the City of Redmond Planning Commission before being elected to the Oregon House of Representatives.

In December 2017, Zika filed his candidacy to become the next representative for District 53 replacing incumbent Gene Whisnant, who decided to retire after more than fifteen years in office. In the Republican primary election, Zika faced an incredibly close election result against primary opponent and conservative activist Ben Schimmoller. The initial count showed Zika leading Schimmoller by 11 votes, but the final recount narrowed Zika's victory to a margin of two votes. In the general election, Zika defeated his Democratic opponent, retired Daimler Trucks executive Eileen Kiely, securing 56% of the vote to become the new Representative for the district. He became the first state legislator from Redmond in 40 years, the last being Sam Johnson, who served in the Legislature from 1965 to 1978.

=== 80th Oregon Legislative Assembly ===
In the 80th Oregon Legislative Assembly, Zika serves on the House Committee On Energy and Environment, the House Committee On Human Services and Housing, and the House Committee On Veterans and Emergency Preparedness.

Zika was the chief sponsor on House Bill 2222, a bill to improve wildfire protection in Oregon. HB 2222 would require the Oregon Department of Forestry to report to the state legislature regarding its implementation of the Oregon Forestland-Urban Interface Act, which was signed into law in 1997. This act was intended to provide property owners resources from the Oregon Department of Forestry and incentives to help eliminate brush and ladder fuels around homes, to better protect Oregon residents from wildfires. HB 2222 received broad bipartisan support in both chambers of the state legislature and was signed into law by Governor Kate Brown on May 23, 2019.

Zika opposed House Bill 3063, which would have ended all non-medical exemptions to school vaccination requirements. He described the experience of his son developing a rash after receiving a partial vaccination for chickenpox as part of his rationale for opposing the bill. HB 3063 passed the House and went to the Oregon Senate for deliberation, but the bill was ultimately scrapped as part of a concession deal from House Democrats. House Republicans had previously walked out in strike over House Bill 3427, which would generate an annual $1 billion business tax to fund school grants and other education programs. The concession deal prompted House Republicans to return and allow the quorum necessary to vote on the latter bill.

Zika opposed Senate Bill 608, which would limit annual rent increases and strengthen tenants’ rights. He expressed concerns about the unintended consequences for the bill and that it could reduce the quantity and quality of housing available. Zika also opposed Senate Bill 320, which would allow Oregon to observe daylight saving time on a year-round basis.

== Personal life ==
Zika lives in Redmond with his wife, Zanthel, and their two children. He is an active community volunteer with various organizations including Boys and Girls Club, Red Cross, and Habitat for Humanity.

== Electoral history ==
2018 Oregon State Representative, 53rd district
Party	Candidate	Votes	%
Republican	Jack Zika	21,063	56.4
Democratic	Eileen Kiely	16,207	43.4
Write-in		52	0.1
Total votes		37,322	100%

2020 Oregon State Representative, 53rd district
Party	Candidate	Votes	%
Republican	Jack Zika	27,442	57.1
Democratic	Emerson Levy	20,569	42.8
Write-in		72	0.1
Total votes		48,083	100%
