= Darcey Edwards =

American politician

Member of the Oregon House of Representatives from the 31st district
- Incumbent
- Assumed office January 13, 2025
- Preceded by: Brian Stout

Personal details
- Party: Republican

Darcey Edwards is an American Republican politician currently serving in the Oregon House of Representatives. She represents the 31st district, which contains most of Columbia County as well as western Washington County and northwestern Multnomah County.

== Biography ==
Edwards works as a real estate agent.

== Electoral history ==
2024 Oregon State Representative, 31st district
Party	Candidate	Votes	%
Republican	Darcey Edwards	23,972	59.0
Democratic	Jordan Gutierrez	15,145	37.3
Libertarian	Robert Miller	1,389	3.4
Write-in		93	0.2
Total votes		40,599	100%
