= 2024 Oregon House of Representatives election =

- November 5, 2024

All 60 seats in the Oregon House of Representatives 31 seats needed for a majority
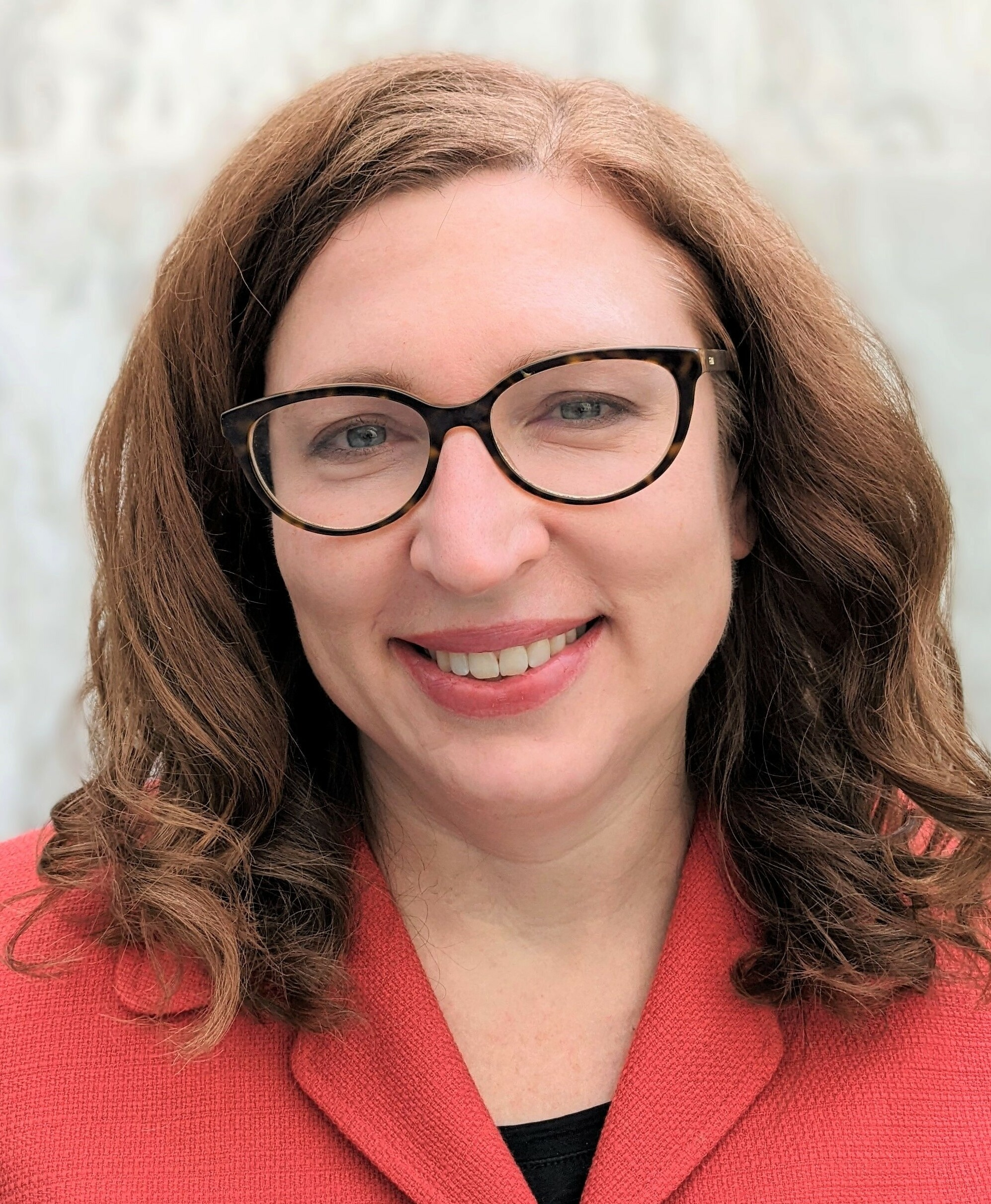

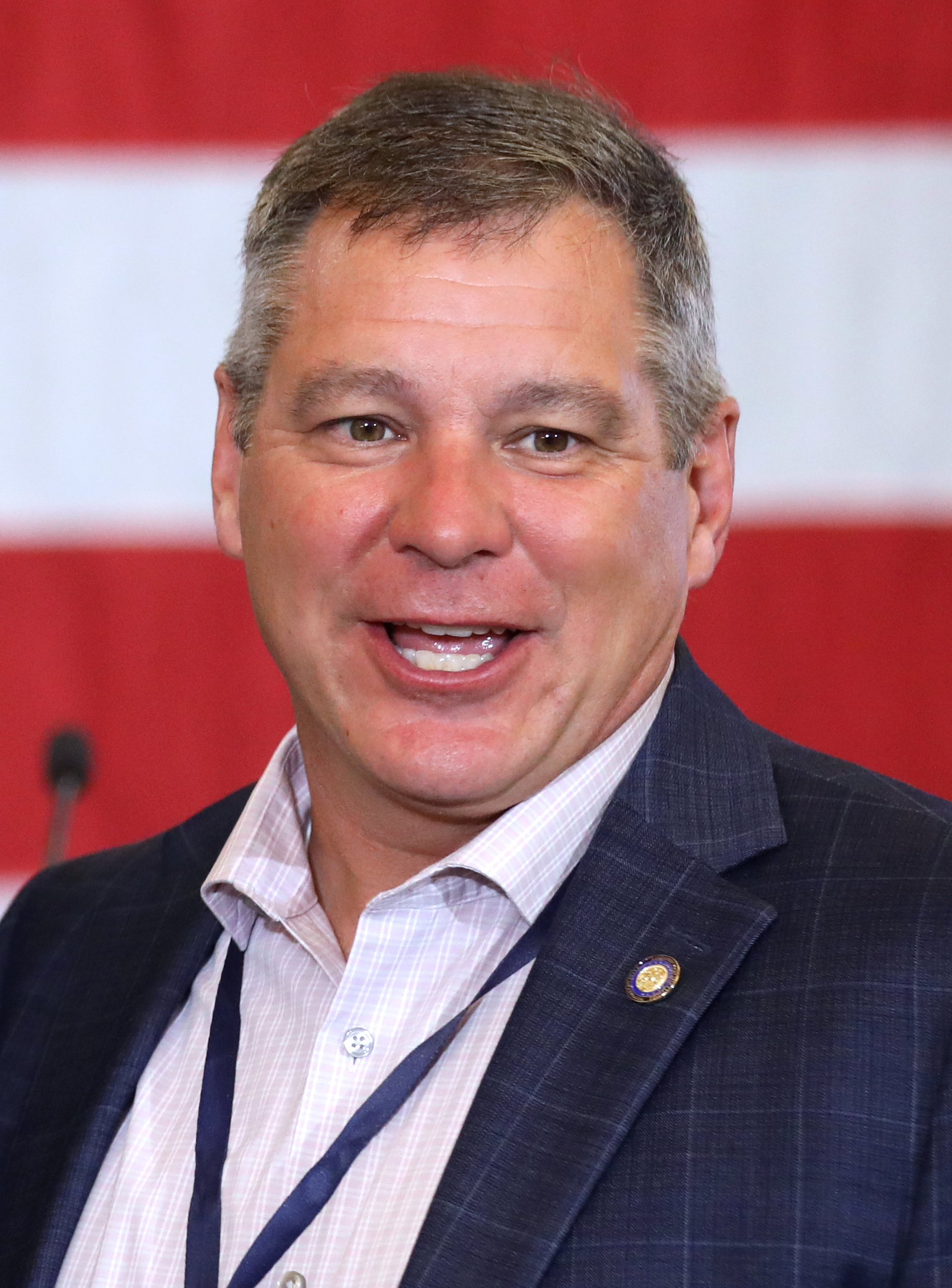
	Majority party	Minority party
Leader	Julie Fahey	Jeff Helfrich
Party	Democratic	Republican
Leader since	March 7, 2024	September 27, 2023
Leader's seat	14th–Eugene	52nd–Hood River
Last election	35 seats, 58.3%	25 seats, 41.6%
Seats won	36	24
Seat change	▲1	▼1
- Democratic gain Democratic hold Republican hold 50–60% 60–70% 70–80% 80–90% >90% 50–60% 60–70% 70–80% >90%
Speaker before election
Julie Fahey
Democratic
Elected Speaker
Julie Fahey
Democratic

The 2024 Oregon House of Representatives elections were held on Tuesday, November 5, 2024. Primary elections were held on Tuesday, May 21, 2024. All of the 60 seats of the Oregon House of Representatives were to be elected. The elections coincided with the elections for other offices, including for State Senate, as part of the 2024 Oregon elections. Democrats gained one seat, earning a three-fifths supermajority for the first time since the 2020 House election.

In total, 9 freshman representatives were elected in 2024 (5 Democrats and 4 Republicans). Out of these, 6 were elected to seats vacated by retirements, 2 (both Republicans) defeated primary challengers, and 1 flipped a seat held by the opposing party.

== Retirements ==
Six incumbents did not seek re-election.

=== Republicans ===
Two Republicans did not seek re-election.

1. District 4: Christine Goodwin retired to run for State Senate.
2. District 31: Brian Stout retired.

=== Democrats ===
Four Democrats did not seek re-election.

1. District 8: Paul Holvey retired.
2. District 16: Dan Rayfield retired to run for Attorney General.
3. District 39: Janelle Bynum retired to run for U.S. House.
4. District 46: Khanh Pham retired to run for State Senate.

== Incumbents defeated ==
=== In primary election ===
Two incumbent representatives, both Republicans, were defeated in the May 21 primary election.

==== Republicans ====
1. District 12: Charlie Conrad lost renomination to Darin Harbick.
2. District 51: James Hieb lost renomination to Christine Drazan.

=== In general election ===
One incumbent representative was defeated in the November 5 general election.

==== Republicans ====
1. District 22: Tracy Cramer lost to Democrat Lesly Muñoz.

== Predictions ==
Source	Ranking	As of
CNalysis	Very Likely D	March 25, 2024

== Summary of results ==
Party	Candidates		Votes	%	Primary seats		
Party	Primary	Secondary	Votes	%	Before	After	+/−
Democratic			1,091,491	55.19	35	36	+1
Republican			850,882	43.02	25	24	-1
Nonaffiliated			9,159	0.46	0	0	±0
Pacific Green			4,781	0.24	0	0	±0
Libertarian			3,687	0.19	0	0	±0
IPO			1,252	0.06	0	0	±0
Write-in			16,501	0.83	0	0	±0
Total			1,977,753	100.0	60	60	±0

== Results by district ==
=== District 1 ===
==== Republican primary ====
Republican primary results
Party	Candidate	Votes	%
Republican	Court Boice	7,871	97.81
Write-in		176	2.19
Total votes		8,047	100.00

===== Declared =====
- Court Boice, incumbent

==== Democratic primary ====
Democratic primary results
Party	Candidate	Votes	%
Democratic	Bret Cecil	4,006	97.68
Write-in		95	2.32
Total votes		4,101	100.00

===== Declared =====
- Bret Cecil, Veterinary assistant

===== General =====
General election results
Party	Candidate	Votes	%
Republican	Court Boice	26,950	67.24
Democratic	Bret Cecil	13,036	32.52
Write-in		94	0.23
Total votes		40,080	100.00

=== District 2 ===
==== Republican primary ====
Republican primary results
Party	Candidate	Votes	%
Republican	Virgle J. Osborne	7,435	97.92
Write-in		158	2.08
Total votes		7,593	100.00

===== Declared =====
- Virgle J. Osborne, incumbent

==== Democratic primary ====
Democratic primary results
Party	Candidate	Votes	%
Democratic	August Warren (write-in)	206	33.39
Write-in		411	66.61
Total votes		617	100.00

===== General =====
General election results
Party	Candidate	Votes	%
Republican	Virgle J. Osborne	26,774	71.17
Democratic	August Warren	10,736	28.54
Write-in		111	0.30
Total votes		37,621	100.00

=== District 3 ===
==== Republican primary ====
Republican primary results
Party	Candidate	Votes	%
Republican	Dwayne Yunker	7,598	97.64
Write-in		184	2.36
Total votes		7,782	100.00

===== Declared =====
- Dwayne Yunker, incumbent

==== Democratic primary ====
Democratic primary results
Party	Candidate	Votes	%
Democratic	Mark J. Seligman	2,449	61.29
Democratic	Dustin Watkins	1,457	36.46
Write-in		90	2.25
Total votes		3,996	100.00

===== Declared =====
- Mark J. Seligman, landscaper
- Dustin Watkins, dishwasher

===== General =====
General election results
Party	Candidate	Votes	%
Republican	Dwayne Yunker	23,618	66.56
Democratic	Mark J. Seligman	10,992	30.98
Write-in		873	2.46
Total votes		35,483	100.00

=== District 4 ===
==== Republican primary ====
Republican primary results
Party	Candidate	Votes	%
Republican	Alek Skarlatos	8,838	99.35
Write-in		58	0.65
Total votes		8,896	100.00

===== Declared =====
- Alek Skarlatos, Former U.S. National Guard soldier and candidate for Oregon's 4th congressional district in 2020 and 2022.

==== Democratic primary ====
Democratic primary results
Party	Candidate	Votes	%
Democratic	Richard Chasm	3,083	98.40
Write-in		50	1.60
Total votes		3,133	100.00

===== Declared =====
- Richard Chasm, Timberland owner

===== General =====
General election results
Party	Candidate	Votes	%
Republican	Alek Skarlatos	27,636	70.18
Democratic	Richard Chasm	11,671	29.64
Write-in		70	0.18
Total votes		39,377	100.00

=== District 5 ===
==== Republican primary ====
Republican primary results
Party	Candidate	Votes	%
Republican	Katherine Green	3,070	63.50
Republican	Sandra Abercrombie	1,713	35.43
Write-in		52	1.08
Total votes		4,835	100.00

===== Declared =====
- Sandra A. Abercrombie, Former Math coach and candidate for 2022.
- Katherine Green, President of V.P. Amitel, Inc

==== Democratic primary ====
Democratic primary results
Party	Candidate	Votes	%
Democratic	Pam Marsh	10,125	99.61
Write-in		40	0.39
Total votes		10,165	100.00

===== Declared =====
- Pam Marsh, incumbent

===== General =====
General election results
Party	Candidate	Votes	%
Democratic	Pam Marsh	25,300	64.07
Republican	Katherine Green	14,153	35.84
Write-in		34	0.09
Total votes		39,487	100.00

=== District 6 ===
==== Republican primary ====
Republican primary results
Party	Candidate	Votes	%
Republican	Kim Wallan	5,315	98.90
Write-in		59	1.10
Total votes		5,374	100.00

===== Declared =====
- Kim Wallan, incumbent

==== Democratic primary ====
Democratic primary results
Party	Candidate	Votes	%
Democratic	Lilia Caballero	3,971	91.02
Democratic	John P. Holm	351	8.04
Write-in		41	0.94
Total votes		4,363	100.00

===== Declared =====
- Lilia Caballero, outreach coordinator
- John P. Holm, disabled

===== General =====
General election results
Party	Candidate	Votes	%
Republican	Kim Wallan	18,557	57.98
Democratic	Lilia Caballero	13,408	41.89
Write-in		40	0.12
Total votes		32,005	100.00

=== District 7 ===
==== Republican primary ====
Republican primary results
Party	Candidate	Votes	%
Republican	Cory Burket	3,024	98.63
Write-in		42	1.37
Total votes		3,066	100.00

===== Declared =====
- Cory Burket, Project Manager

==== Democratic primary ====
Democratic primary results
Party	Candidate	Votes	%
Democratic	John Lively	4,855	86.53
Democratic	Ryan Rhoads	715	12.74
Write-in		41	0.73
Total votes		5,611	100.00

===== Declared =====
- John Lively, incumbent
- Ryan Rhoads, laborer

===== General =====
General election results
Party	Candidate	Votes	%
Democratic	John Lively	18,868	55.80
Republican	Cory Burket	14,888	44.03
Write-in		59	0.17
Total votes		33,815	100.00

=== District 8 ===
==== Democratic primary ====
Democratic primary results
Party	Candidate	Votes	%
Democratic	Lisa Fragala	9,130	72.19
Democratic	Doyle Canning	3,507	27.73
Write-in		11	0.09
Total votes		12,648	100.00

===== Declared =====
- Doyle Canning, environmental activist and candidate for US Congressional District in 2020 and 2022.
- Lisa Fragala, Partnership Coordinator

===== General =====
General election results
Party	Candidate	Votes	%
Democratic	Lisa Fragala	24,811	97.37
Write-in		670	2.63
Total votes		25,481	100.00

=== District 9 ===
==== Republican primary ====
Republican primary results
Party	Candidate	Votes	%
Republican	Boomer Wright	6,306	98.93
Write-in		68	1.07
Total votes		6,374	100.00

===== Declared =====
- Boomer Wright. incumbent

==== Democratic primary ====
Democratic primary results
Party	Candidate	Votes	%
Democratic	Erik S. Schuttpelz	5,216	98.17
Write-in		97	1.83
Total votes		5,313	100.00

===== Declared =====
- Erik S. Schuttpelz

===== General =====
General election results
Party	Candidate	Votes	%
Republican	Boomer Wright	23,115	61.81
Democratic	William Mrkvicka (Note: Replaced Erik Schuttpelz, who won Democratic primary but withdrew)	14,196	37.96
Write-in		86	0.23
Total votes		37,397	100.00

=== District 10 ===
==== Republican primary ====
Republican primary results
Party	Candidate	Votes	%
Democratic	David Gomberg (write-in)	53	15.32
Write-in		293	84.68
Total votes		346	100.00

==== Democratic primary ====
Democratic primary results
Party	Candidate	Votes	%
Democratic	David Gomberg	7,914	99.40
Write-in		48	0.60
Total votes		7,962	100.00

===== Declared =====
- David Gomberg, incumbent

===== General =====
General election results
Party	Candidate	Votes	%
Democratic	David Gomberg	28,672	97.37
Write-in		775	2.63
Total votes		29,447	100.00

=== District 11 ===
==== Republican primary ====
Republican primary results
Party	Candidate	Votes	%
Republican	Jami Cate	7,689	99.07
Write-in		72	0.93
Total votes		7,761	100.00

===== Declared =====
- Jami Cate, incumbent

==== Democratic primary ====
Democratic primary results
Party	Candidate	Votes	%
Democratic	Nina Brenner	2,553	96.63
Write-in		89	3.37
Total votes		2,642	100.00

===== Declared =====
- Nina Brenner, retired engineer (Note: Withdrew prior to general election)

===== General =====
General election results
Party	Candidate	Votes	%
Republican	Jami Cate	26,148	73.82
Nonaffiliated	Ivan Maluski	9,159	25.86
Write-in		112	0.32
Total votes		35,419	100.00

=== District 12 ===
==== Republican primary ====
Republican primary results
Party	Candidate	Votes	%
Republican	Darin Harbick	6,709	82.53
Republican	Charlie Conrad	1,397	17.19
Write-in		23	0.28
Total votes		8,129	100.00

===== Declared =====
- Darin Harbick, small business owner, member of the McKenzie High School Board, and candidate for US Senate in 2022.
- Charlie Conrad, incumbent

==== Democratic primary ====
Democratic primary results
Party	Candidate	Votes	%
Democratic	Michelle Emmons (write-in)	655	34.60
Write-in		1,238	65.40
Total votes		1,893	100.00

===== General =====
General election results
Party	Candidate	Votes	%
Republican	Darin Harbick	23,256	57.66
Democratic	Michelle Emmons	17,012	42.18
Write-in		62	0.15
Total votes		40,330	100.00

=== District 13 ===
==== Republican primary ====
Republican primary results
Party	Candidate	Votes	%
Republican	Timothy S. Sutherland	3,062	98.05
Write-in		61	1.95
Total votes		3,123	100.00

===== Declared =====
- Timothy S. Sutherland, CEO of Ask Insurance

==== Democratic primary ====
Democratic primary results
Party	Candidate	Votes	%
Democratic	Nancy Nathanson	8,833	98.98
Write-in		91	1.02
Total votes		8,924	100.00

===== Declared =====
- Nancy Nathanson, incumbent

===== General =====
General election results
Party	Candidate	Votes	%
Democratic	Nancy Nathanson	27,143	66.49
Republican	Timothy S. Sutherland	13,630	33.39
Write-in		52	0.13
Total votes		40,825	100.00

=== District 14 ===
==== Democratic primary ====
Democratic primary results
Party	Candidate	Votes	%
Democratic	Julie Fahey	6,348	99.36
Write-in		41	0.64
Total votes		6,389	100.00

===== Declared =====
- Julie Fahey, incumbent

===== General =====
General election results
Party	Candidate	Votes	%
Democratic	Julie Fahey	22,176	94.09
Write-in		1,392	5.91
Total votes		23,568	100.00

=== District 15 ===
==== Republican primary ====
Republican primary results
Party	Candidate	Votes	%
Republican	Shelly Boshart Davis	5,695	99.25
Write-in		43	0.75
Total votes		5,738	100.00

===== Declared =====
- Shelly Boshart Davis, incumbent

==== Democratic primary ====
Democratic primary results
Party	Candidate	Votes	%
Democratic	Terrence Virnig	4,206	98.20
Write-in		77	1.80
Total votes		4,283	100.00

===== Declared =====
- Terrence Virnig

===== General =====
General election results
Party	Candidate	Votes	%
Republican	Shelly Boshart Davis	22,197	58.71
Democratic	Terrence Virnig	15,566	41.17
Write-in		43	0.11
Total votes		37,806	100.00

=== District 16 ===
==== Republican primary ====
Republican primary results
Party	Candidate	Votes	%
Republican	Sarah Finger McDonald (write-in)	22	11.00
Write-in		178	89.00
Total votes		200	100.00

==== Democratic primary ====
Democratic primary results
Party	Candidate	Votes	%
Democratic	Sarah Finger McDonald	5,095	50.71
Democratic	Sami Al-Abdrabbuh	4,932	49.09
Write-in		20	0.20
Total votes		4,283	100.00

===== Declared =====
- Sarah Finger McDonald
- Sami Al-Abdrabbuh

===== General =====
General election results
Party	Candidate	Votes	%
Democratic	Sarah Finger McDonald	24,894	82.81
Pacific Green	Michael A. Beilstein	4,781	15.90
Write-in		388	1.29
Total votes		30,063	100.00

=== District 17 ===
==== Republican primary ====
Republican primary results
Party	Candidate	Votes	%
Republican	Ed Diehl	6,080	99.43
Write-in		35	0.57
Total votes		6,115	100.00

===== Declared =====
- Ed Diehl, incumbent

==== Democratic primary ====
Democratic primary results
Party	Candidate	Votes	%
Democratic	David W. Beem	2,505	97.85
Write-in		55	2.15
Total votes		2,560	100.00

===== Declared =====
- David W. Beem

===== General =====
General election results
Party	Candidate	Votes	%
Republican	Ed Diehl	23,759	69.27
Democratic	David W. Beem	10,486	30.57
Write-in		52	0.15
Total votes		34,297	100.00

=== District 18 ===
==== Republican primary ====
Republican primary results
Party	Candidate	Votes	%
Republican	Rick Lewis	6,062	
Write-in		42	
Total votes			100.00

===== Declared =====
- Rick Lewis, incumbent

==== Democratic primary ====
Democratic primary results
Party	Candidate	Votes	%
Democratic	Barry Shapiro (write-in)	412	40.75
Write-in		599	59.25
Total votes		1,011	100.00

===== General =====
General election results
Party	Candidate	Votes	%
Republican	Rick Lewis	26,553	70.81
Democratic	Karyssa Dow	10,884	29.03
Write-in		61	0.16
Total votes		37,498	100.00

=== District 19 ===
==== Republican primary ====
Republican primary results
Party	Candidate	Votes	%
Republican	David Brown	3,582	98.90
Write-in		40	1.10
Total votes		3,622	100.00

==== Democratic primary ====
Democratic primary results
Party	Candidate	Votes	%
Democratic	Tom Andersen	5,152	98.98
Write-in		53	1.02
Total votes		5,205	100.00

===== Declared =====
- Tom Andersen, incumbent

===== General =====
General election results
Party	Candidate	Votes	%
Democratic	Tom Andersen	17,296	54.26
Republican	David Brown	14,534	45.60
Write-in		45	0.14
Total votes		31,875	100.00

=== District 20 ===
==== Republican primary ====
Republican primary results
Party	Candidate	Votes	%
Republican	Kevin S. Chambers	4,302	98.76
Write-in		54	1.24
Total votes		4,356	100.00

===== Declared =====
- Kevin S. Chambers

==== Democratic primary ====
Democratic primary results
Party	Candidate	Votes	%
Democratic	Paul Evans	6,177	98.77
Write-in		77	1.23
Total votes		6,254	100.00

===== Declared =====
- Paul Evans, incumbent

===== General =====
General election results
Party	Candidate	Votes	%
Democratic	Paul Evans	20,721	57.99
Republican	Kevin S. Chambers	14,938	41.81
Write-in		73	0.20
Total votes		35,732	100.00

=== District 21 ===
==== Republican primary ====
Republican primary results
Party	Candidate	Votes	%
Republican	Kevin Mannix	3,923	98.47
Write-in		61	1.53
Total votes		3,984	100.00

===== Declared =====
- Kevin Mannix, incumbent

==== Democratic primary ====
Democratic primary results
Party	Candidate	Votes	%
Democratic	Virginia Stapleton	3,426	77.83
Democratic	Keith Haxton	941	21.38
Write-in		35	0.80
Total votes		5,205	100.00

===== Declared =====
- Virginia Stapleton
- Keith Haxton

===== General =====
General election results
Party	Candidate	Votes	%
Republican	Kevin Mannix	14,924	51.83
Democratic	Virginia Stapleton	13,822	48.00
Write-in		49	0.17
Total votes		28,795	100.00

=== District 22 ===
==== Republican primary ====
Republican primary results
Party	Candidate	Votes	%
Republican	Tracy M. Cramer	2,534	99.14
Write-in		22	0.86
Total votes		2,556	100.00

===== Declared =====
- Tracy M. Cramer, incumbent

==== Democratic primary ====
Democratic primary results
Party	Candidate	Votes	%
Democratic	Lesly Muñoz	2,310	98.34
Write-in		39	1.66
Total votes		2,332	100.00

===== Declared =====
- Lesly Muñoz, consultant for the Oregon Education Association

===== General =====
General election results
Party	Candidate	Votes	%
Democratic	Lesly Muñoz	10,480	50.30
Republican	Tracy M. Cramer	10,319	49.53
Write-in		36	0.17
Total votes		20,835	100.00

=== District 23 ===
==== Republican primary ====
Republican primary results
Party	Candidate	Votes	%
Republican	Anna M. Scharf	6,837	99.23
Write-in		53	0.77
Total votes		6,890	100.00

===== Declared =====
- Anna M. Scharf, incumbent

==== Democratic primary ====
Democratic primary results
Party	Candidate	Votes	%
Democratic	Kriss Wright	4,004	98.14
Write-in		76	1.86
Total votes		4,080	100.00

===== Declared =====
- Kriss Wright

===== General =====
General election results
Party	Candidate	Votes	%
Republican	Anna M. Scharf	24,492	62.05
Democratic	Kriss Wright	14,929	37.82
Write-in		49	0.12
Total votes		39,470	100.00

=== District 24 ===
==== Republican primary ====
Republican primary results
Party	Candidate	Votes	%
Republican	Lucetta A. Elmer	5,667	99.04
Write-in		55	0.96
Total votes		5,722	100.00

===== Declared =====
- Lucetta A. Elmer, incumbent

==== Democratic primary ====
Democratic primary results
Party	Candidate	Votes	%
Democratic	Lisa Pool (write-in)	77	12.98
Write-in		516	87.02
Total votes		593	100.00

===== General =====
General election results
Party	Candidate	Votes	%
Republican	Lucetta A. Elmer	20,798	59.62
Democratic	Lisa Pool	14,033	40.23
Write-in		55	0.16
Total votes		34,886	100.00

=== District 25 ===
==== Republican primary ====
Republican primary results
Party	Candidate	Votes	%
Republican	Bob Niemeyer	2,517	98.28
Write-in		44	1.72
Total votes		2,561	100.00

===== Declared =====
- Bob Niemeyer

==== Democratic primary ====
Democratic primary results
Party	Candidate	Votes	%
Democratic	Ben Bowman	6,063	99.34
Write-in		40	0.66
Total votes		6,103	100.00

===== Declared =====
- Ben Bowman, incumbent

===== General =====
General election results
Party	Candidate	Votes	%
Democratic	Ben Bowman	24,096	67.63
Republican	Bob Niemeyer	11,473	32.20
Write-in		60	0.17
Total votes		35,629	100.00

=== District 26 ===
==== Republican primary ====
Republican primary results
Party	Candidate	Votes	%
Republican	Jason E. Fields	3,660	98.63
Write-in		51	1.37
Total votes		3,711	100.00

===== Declared =====
- Jason E. Fields

==== Democratic primary ====
Democratic primary results
Party	Candidate	Votes	%
Democratic	Courtney Neron	5,418	99.16
Write-in		46	0.84
Total votes		5,464	100.00

===== Declared =====
- Courtney Neron, incumbent

===== General =====
General election results
Party	Candidate	Votes	%
Democratic	Courtney Neron	20,931	56.10
Republican	Jason E. Fields	16,345	43.81
Write-in		31	0.08
Total votes		37,307	100.00

=== District 27 ===
==== Republican primary ====
Republican primary results
Party	Candidate	Votes	%
Republican	Sandra Nelson	2,017	98.68
Write-in		27	1.32
Total votes		2,044	100.00

===== Declared =====
- Sandra Nelson

==== Democratic primary ====
Democratic primary results
Party	Candidate	Votes	%
Democratic	Ken Helm	6,500	99.40
Write-in		39	0.60
Total votes		6,539	100.00

===== Declared =====
- Ken Helm, incumbent

===== General =====
General election results
Party	Candidate	Votes	%
Democratic	Ken Helm	25,142	74.04
Republican	Victoria Kingsbury	8,780	25.86
Write-in		35	0.10
Total votes		33,957	100.00

=== District 28 ===
==== Republican primary ====
Republican primary results
Party	Candidate	Votes	%
Republican	Charles Mengis	1,413	96.85
Write-in		46	3.15
Total votes		1,459	100.00

===== Declared =====
- Charles Mengis

==== Democratic primary ====
Democratic primary results
Party	Candidate	Votes	%
Democratic	Dacia Grayber	10,247	99.67
Write-in		34	0.33
Total votes		10,281	100.00

===== Declared =====
- Dacia Grayber, incumbent

===== Endorsements =====
Dacia Grayber
- Portland Mercury

===== General =====
General election results
Party	Candidate	Votes	%
Democratic	Dacia Grayber	34,188	85.85
Republican	Charles Mengis	5,575	14.00
Write-in		60	0.15
Total votes		39,823	100.00

=== District 29 ===
==== Republican primary ====
Republican primary results
Party	Candidate	Votes	%
Democratic	Susan McLain (write-in)	28	9.72
Write-in		260	90.28
Total votes		288	100.00

==== Democratic primary ====
Democratic primary results
Party	Candidate	Votes	%
Democratic	Susan McLain	3,892	99.16
Write-in		33	0.84
Total votes		3,925	100.00

===== Declared =====
- Susan McLain, incumbent

===== General =====
General election results
Party	Candidate	Votes	%
Democratic	Susan McLain	20,176	96.38
Write-in		758	3.62
Total votes		20,934	100.00

=== District 30 ===
==== Democratic primary ====
Democratic primary results
Party	Candidate	Votes	%
Democratic	Nathan Sosa	4,170	99.57
Write-in		33	0.43
Total votes		4,188	100.00

===== Declared =====
- Nathan Sosa, incumbent

===== General =====
General election results
Party	Candidate	Votes	%
Democratic	Nathan Sosa	20,254	96.43
Write-in		750	3.57
Total votes		21,004	100.00

=== District 31 ===
==== Republican primary ====
Republican primary results
Party	Candidate	Votes	%
Republican	Darcey Edwards	5,529	80.98
Republican	Aaron L. Hall	1,234	18.07
Write-in		65	0.95
Total votes			100.00

===== Declared =====
- Aaron L. Hall
- Darcey Edwards, real estate agent

===== Endorsements =====
Darcey Edwards
- Willamette Week

==== Democratic primary ====
Democratic primary results
Party	Candidate	Votes	%
Democratic	Jordan Gutierrez	4,882	97.17
Write-in		142	2.83
Total votes		5,024	100.00

===== Declared =====
- Jordan Gutierrez

===== General =====
General election results
Party	Candidate	Votes	%
Republican	Darcey Edwards	23,972	59.05
Democratic	Jordan Gutierrez	15,145	37.30
Libertarian	Robert Miller	1,389	3.42
Write-in		93	0.23
Total votes		40,599	100.00

=== District 32 ===
==== Republican primary ====
Republican primary results
Party	Candidate	Votes	%
Republican	Cyrus B. Javadi	4,584	72.02
Republican	Glenn Gaither	694	27.51
Write-in		30	0.47
Total votes			100.00

===== Declared =====
- Cyrus B. Javadi, incumbent
- Glenn Gaither

==== Democratic primary ====
Democratic primary results
Party	Candidate	Votes	%
Democratic	Logan C. Laity	6,125	98.46
Write-in		96	1.54
Total votes		6,221	100.00

===== Declared =====
- Logan C. Laity

===== General =====
General election results
Party	Candidate	Votes	%
Republican	Cyrus B. Javadi	20,409	52.10
Democratic	Andy Davis	18,692	47.72
Write-in		68	0.17
Total votes		39,169	100.00

=== District 33 ===
==== Republican primary ====
Republican primary results
Party	Candidate	Votes	%
Republican	Stan Baumhofer	567	49.96
Republican	Dick Courter	533	46.96
Write-in		35	3.08
Total votes		1,135	100.00

===== Declared =====
- Dick Courter, forestry consultant
- Stan Baumhofer

===== Endorsements =====
Dick Courter
- Willamette Week

==== Democratic primary ====
Democratic primary results
Party	Candidate	Votes	%
Democratic	Shannon Jones Isadore	5,751	51.54
Democratic	Pete M. Grabiel	3,105	27.83
Democratic	Brian Duty	2,275	20.39
Write-in		28	0.25
Total votes		11,159	100.00

===== Declared =====
- Shannon Jones Isadore, investment broker and drug treatment nonprofit founder
- Pete M. Gabriel
- Brian Duty

===== Endorsements =====
Shannon Jones Isadore
- Willamette Week
- Portland Mercury

===== General =====
General election results
Party	Candidate	Votes	%
Democratic	Shannon Jones Isadore	29,132	83.60
Republican	Stan Baumhofer	4,400	12.63
Libertarian	Thomas J. Busse	1,258	3.61
Write-in		58	0.17
Total votes		34,848	100.00

=== District 34 ===
==== Republican primary ====
Republican primary results
Party	Candidate	Votes	%
Republican	John Verbeek	1,876	98.27
Write-in		33	1.73
Total votes		1,909	100.00

===== Declared =====
- John Verbeek

==== Democratic primary ====
Democratic primary results
Party	Candidate	Votes	%
Democratic	Lisa Reynolds	5,020	99.56
Write-in		22	0.44
Total votes		5,042	100.00

===== Declared =====
- Lisa Reynolds, incumbent

===== Endorsements =====
Lisa Reynolds
- Portland Mercury

===== General =====
General election results
Party	Candidate	Votes	%
Democratic	Lisa Reynolds	22,572	71.46
Republican	John Verbeek	8,973	28.41
Write-in		44	0.14
Total votes		31,589	100.00

=== District 35 ===
==== Republican primary ====
Republican primary results
Party	Candidate	Votes	%
Republican	Dan Martin	1,343	97.87
Write-in		29	2.11
Total votes		1,372	100.00

===== Declared =====
- Dan Martin

==== Democratic primary ====
Democratic primary results
Party	Candidate	Votes	%
Democratic	Farrah Chaichi	3,506	78.28
Democratic	Casey Zimmerman	953	21.28
Write-in		20	0.45
Total votes		4,479	100.00

===== Declared =====
- Farrah Chaichi, intake and conflicts coordinator, incumbent
- Casey Zimmerman

===== Endorsements =====
Farrah Chaichi
- Willamette Week

===== General =====
General election results
Party	Candidate	Votes	%
Democratic	Farrah Chaichi	17,072	68.98
Republican	Dan Martin	7,631	30.83
Write-in		445	0.18
Total votes		24,748	100.00

=== District 36 ===
==== Republican primary ====
Republican primary results
Party	Candidate	Votes	%
Republican	Shawn Chummar	2,793	98.35
Write-in		47	1.65
Total votes		2,840	100.00

===== Declared =====
- Shawn Chummar

==== Democratic primary ====
Democratic primary results
Party	Candidate	Votes	%
Democratic	Hai Pham	4,974	99.26
Write-in		37	0.74
Total votes		5,011	100.00

===== Declared =====
- Hai Pham, incumbent

===== General =====
General election results
Party	Candidate	Votes	%
Democratic	Hai Pham	23,250	62.88
Republican	Shawn Chummar	13,685	37.01
Write-in		40	0.11
Total votes		36,975	100.00

=== District 37 ===
==== Republican primary ====
Republican primary results
Party	Candidate	Votes	%
Republican	Ben Edtl	3,248	98.45
Write-in		51	1.55
Total votes		3,299	100.00

===== Declared =====
- Ben Edtl

==== Democratic primary ====
Democratic primary results
Party	Candidate	Votes	%
Democratic	Jules Walters	7,460	89.46
Democratic	Brian Maguire	865	10.37
Write-in		14	0.17
Total votes		8,339	100.00

===== Declared =====
- Jules Walters, incumbent
- Brian Maguire, software company CEO

===== Endorsements =====
Jules Walters
- Willamette Week

===== General =====
General election results
Party	Candidate	Votes	%
Democratic	Jules Walters	23,356	61.26
Republican	Ben Edtl	14,703	38.57
Write-in		65	0.17
Total votes		38,124	100.00

=== District 38 ===
==== Democratic primary ====
Democratic primary results
Party	Candidate	Votes	%
Democratic	Daniel Nguyen	9,946	99.64
Write-in		36	0.36
Total votes		9,982	100.00

===== Declared =====
- Daniel Nguyen, incumbent

===== General =====
General election results
Party	Candidate	Votes	%
Democratic	Daniel Nguyen	30,385	97.86
Write-in		664	2.14
Total votes		31,049	100.00

=== District 39 ===
==== Republican primary ====
Republican primary results
Party	Candidate	Votes	%
Republican	Aimee L. Reiner	2,421	97.78
Write-in		55	2.22
Total votes		2,476	100.00

===== Declared =====
- Aimee L. Reiner

==== Democratic primary ====
Democratic primary results
Party	Candidate	Votes	%
Democratic	April Dobson	4,271	99.28
Write-in		31	0.72
Total votes		4,302	100.00

===== Declared =====
- April Dobson

===== General =====
General election results
Party	Candidate	Votes	%
Democratic	April Dobson	17,712	54.43
Republican	Aimee L. Reiner	14,753	45.34
Write-in		75	0.23
Total votes		32,540	100.00

=== District 40 ===
==== Republican primary ====
Republican primary results
Party	Candidate	Votes	%
Republican	Michael Steven Newgard	3,007	60.01
Republican	Sue Leslie	1,968	39.27
Write-in		36	0.72
Total votes		5,011	100.00

===== Declared =====
- Michael Steven Newgard, Clackamas County Clerk's Office employee
- Sue Leslie, small business owner

===== Endorsements =====
Michael Steven Newgard
- Willamette Week

==== Democratic primary ====
Democratic primary results
Party	Candidate	Votes	%
Democratic	Annessa Hartman	5,424	99.14
Write-in		47	0.86
Total votes		5,471	100.00

- Annessa Hartman, incumbent

===== General =====
General election results
Party	Candidate	Votes	%
Democratic	Annessa Hartman	20,658	55.85
Republican	Michael Steven Newgard	16,271	43.99
Write-in		60	0.16
Total votes		36,989	100.00

=== District 41 ===
==== Republican primary ====
Republican primary results
Party	Candidate	Votes	%
Republican	Elvis Clark	1,650	98.39
Write-in		27	1.61
Total votes		1,677	100.00

===== Declared =====
- Elvis Clark

==== Democratic primary ====
Democratic primary results
Party	Candidate	Votes	%
Democratic	Mark F. Gamba	10,315	99.21
Write-in		82	0.79
Total votes		10,397	100.00

===== Declared =====
- Mark F. Gamba, incumbent

===== Endorsements =====
Mark F. Gamba
- Portland Mercury

===== General =====
General election results
Party	Candidate	Votes	%
Democratic	Mark F. Gamba	32,386	79.86
Republican	Elvis Clark	8,101	19.98
Write-in		64	0.16
Total votes		40,551	100.00

=== District 42 ===
==== Democratic primary ====
Democratic primary results
Party	Candidate	Votes	%
Democratic	Rob Nosse	11,778	98.86
Write-in		136	1.14
Total votes		11,914	100.00

===== Declared =====
- Rob Nosse, incumbent

===== General =====
General election results
Party	Candidate	Votes	%
Democratic	Rob Nosse	32,941	98.53
Write-in		491	1.47
Total votes		33,432	100.00

=== District 43 ===
==== Republican primary ====
Republican primary results
Party	Candidate	Votes	%
Republican	Tim LeMaster	386	94.15
Write-in		24	5.85
Total votes		410	100.00

===== Declared =====
- Tim LeMaster

==== Democratic primary ====
Democratic primary results
Party	Candidate	Votes	%
Democratic	Tawna Sanchez	11,815	99.32
Write-in		81	0.68
Total votes		11,896	100.00

===== Declared =====
- Tawna Sanchez, incumbent

===== Endorsements =====
Tawna Sanchez
- Portland Mercury

===== General =====
General election results
Party	Candidate	Votes	%
Democratic	Tawna Sanchez	37,084	92.11
Republican	Tim LeMaster	3,078	7.65
Write-in		97	0.24
Total votes		40,259	100.00

=== District 44 ===
==== Democratic primary ====
Democratic primary results
Party	Candidate	Votes	%
Democratic	Travis Nelson	10,240	91.14
Democratic	Christine E. Nair	969	8.62
Write-in		26	0.23
Total votes		11,235	100.00

===== Declared =====
- Travis Nelson, incumbent

===== Endorsements =====
Travis Nelson
- Willamette Week
- Portland Mercury

===== General =====
General election results
Party	Candidate	Votes	%
Democratic	Travis Nelson	27,281	98.29
Write-in		474	1.71
Total votes		27,755	100.00

=== District 45 ===
==== Democratic primary ====
Democratic primary results
Party	Candidate	Votes	%
Democratic	Thuy Tran	10,204	99.12
Write-in		91	0.88
Total votes		10,295	100.00

===== Declared =====
- Thuy Tran, incumbent

===== General =====
General election results
Party	Candidate	Votes	%
Democratic	Thuy Tran	29,118	98.04
Write-in		582	1.96
Total votes		29,700	100.00

=== District 46 ===
==== Democratic primary ====
Democratic primary results
Party	Candidate	Votes	%
Democratic	Willy Chotzen	7,895	72.66
Democratic	Mary Lou Hennrich	2,947	27.12
Write-in		24	0.22
Total votes		10,295	100.00

===== Declared =====
- Willy Chotzen, chief public defender
- Mary Lou Hennrich, former CEO of CareOregon and Oregon Public Health Institute

===== Endorsements =====
Willy Chotzen
- Willamette Week
- Portland Mercury

===== General =====
General election results
Party	Candidate	Votes	%
Democratic	Willy Chotzen	25,542	79.06
Republican	John Mark Alexander	4,414	13.66
Independent Party	Kevin Levy	1,252	3.88
Libertarian	Austin Daniel	1,040	3.22
Write-in		58	0.18
Total votes		32,306	100.00

=== District 47 ===
==== Republican primary ====
Republican primary results
Party	Candidate	Votes	%
Democratic	Andrea Valderrama (write-in)	19	12.10
Write-in		138	87.90
Total votes		157	100.00

==== Democratic primary ====
Democratic primary results
Party	Candidate	Votes	%
Democratic	Andrea Valderrama	4,460	98.76
Write-in		56	1.24
Total votes		4,516	100.00

===== Declared =====
- Andrea Valderrama, incumbent

===== General =====
General election results
Party	Candidate	Votes	%
Democratic	Andrea Valderrama	16,754	95.53
Write-in		784	4.47
Total votes		17,538	100.00

=== District 48 ===
==== Republican primary ====
Republican primary results
Party	Candidate	Votes	%
Republican	John Masterman	2,345	69.30
Republican	Andrew Morrison	1,010	29.85
Write-in		29	0.86
Total votes		3,384	100.00

- Andrew Morrison, sales director
- John Masterman

===== Endorsements =====
Andrew Morrison
- Willamette Week

==== Democratic primary ====
Democratic primary results
Party	Candidate	Votes	%
Democratic	Hoa H. Nguyen	3,496	73.72
Democratic	Elizabeth A. Petersen	1,190	25.09
Write-in		56	1.18
Total votes		4,742	100.00

===== Declared =====
- Hoa H. Nguyen, incumbent
- Elizabeth A. Petersen

===== Endorsements =====
Hoa H. Nguyen
- Willamette Week
- Portland Mercury

===== General =====
General election results
Party	Candidate	Votes	%
Democratic	Hoa H. Nguyen	14,451	52.95
Republican	John Masterman	12,773	46.80
Write-in		69	0.25
Total votes		27,293	100.00

=== District 49 ===
==== Republican primary ====
Republican primary results
Party	Candidate	Votes	%
Republican	Terry A. Tipsord	2,138	98.12
Write-in		41	1.88
Total votes		2,179	100.00

- Terry A. Tipsord

==== Democratic primary ====
Democratic primary results
Party	Candidate	Votes	%
Democratic	Zach Hudson	3,289	98.62
Write-in		46	1.38
Total votes		3,335	100.00

===== Declared =====
- Zach Hudson, incumbent

===== General =====
General election results
Party	Candidate	Votes	%
Democratic	Zach Hudson	13,784	55.82
Republican	Terry A. Tipsord	10,838	43.89
Write-in		71	0.29
Total votes		24,693	100.00

=== District 50 ===
==== Republican primary ====
Republican primary results
Party	Candidate	Votes	%
Republican	Paul Drechsler	2,631	97.84
Write-in		58	2.16
Total votes		2,689	100.00

===== Declared =====
- Paul Drechsler

==== Democratic primary ====
Democratic primary results
Party	Candidate	Votes	%
Democratic	Ricki Ruiz	4,158	98.55
Write-in		61	1.45
Total votes		4,219	100.00

===== Declared =====
- Ricki Ruiz, incumbent

===== General =====
General election results
Party	Candidate	Votes	%
Democratic	Ricki Ruiz	15,014	54.54
Republican	Paul Drechsler	12,448	45.22
Write-in		67	0.24
Total votes		27,529	100.00

=== District 51 ===
==== Republican primary ====
Republican primary results
Party	Candidate	Votes	%
Republican	Christine Drazan	6,142	68.45
Republican	James Hieb	2,824	31.47
Write-in		7	0.08
Total votes		8,973	100.00

- Christine Drazan, former state legislator and 2022 gubernatorial candidate
- James Hieb, incumbent

===== Endorsements =====
Christine Drazan
- Willamette Week

===== General =====
General election results
Party	Candidate	Votes	%
Republican	Christine Drazan	27,872	94.13
Write-in		1,737	5.87
Total votes		29,609	100.00

=== District 52 ===
==== Republican primary ====
Republican primary results
Party	Candidate	Votes	%
Republican	Jeff Helfrich	5,323	99.14
Write-in		46	0.86
Total votes		5,369	100.00

- Jeff Helfrich, incumbent

==== Democratic primary ====
Democratic primary results
Party	Candidate	Votes	%
Democratic	Nick Walden Poublon	5,319	98.72
Write-in		69	1.28
Total votes		5,388	100.00

===== Declared =====
- Nick Walden Poublon

===== General =====
General election results
Party	Candidate	Votes	%
Republican	Jeff Helfrich	18,958	51.84
Democratic	Nick Walden Poublon	17,573	48.05
Write-in		40	0.11
Total votes		36,571	100.00

=== District 53 ===
==== Republican primary ====
Republican primary results
Party	Candidate	Votes	%
Republican	Keri Lopez	5,702	99.01
Write-in		57	0.99
Total votes		5,759	100.00

- Keri Lopez

==== Democratic primary ====
Democratic primary results
Party	Candidate	Votes	%
Democratic	Emerson Levy	7,323	99.36
Write-in		47	0.64
Total votes		7,370	100.00

===== Declared =====
- Emerson Levy, incumbent

===== General =====
General election results
Party	Candidate	Votes	%
Democratic	Emerson Levy	23,866	54.25
Republican	Keri Lopez	20,082	45.65
Write-in		46	0.10
Total votes		43,994	100.00

=== District 54 ===
==== Democratic primary ====
Democratic primary results
Party	Candidate	Votes	%
Democratic	Jason Kropf	8,329	99.43
Write-in		48	0.57
Total votes		8,377	100.00

===== Declared =====
- Jason Kropf, incumbent

===== General =====
General election results
Party	Candidate	Votes	%
Democratic	Jason Kropf	28,395	96.47
Write-in		1,040	3.53
Total votes		29,435	100.00

=== District 55 ===
==== Republican primary ====
Republican primary results
Party	Candidate	Votes	%
Republican	E. Werner Reschke	8,845	99.17
Write-in		74	0.83
Total votes		8,919	100.00

===== Declared =====
- E. Werner Reschke, incumbent

==== Democratic primary ====
Democratic primary results
Party	Candidate	Votes	%
Democratic	James Williamson	2,929	97.93
Write-in		62	2.07
Total votes		2,991	100.00

===== Declared =====
- James Williamson

===== General =====
General election results
Party	Candidate	Votes	%
Republican	E. Werner Reschke	27,260	69.62
Democratic	James Williamson	11,848	30.26
Write-in		45	0.11
Total votes		39,153	100.00

=== District 56 ===
==== Republican primary ====
Republican primary results
Party	Candidate	Votes	%
Republican	Emily G. McIntire	7,122	99.34
Write-in		47	0.66
Total votes		7,169	100.00

- Emily G. McIntire, incumbent

===== General =====
General election results
Party	Candidate	Votes	%
Republican	Emily G. McIntire	25,285	96.69
Write-in		866	3.31
Total votes		26,151	100.00

=== District 57 ===
==== Republican primary ====
Republican primary results
Party	Candidate	Votes	%
Republican	Greg Smith	4,692	75.08
Republican	Raymond Akers	1,548	24.77
Write-in		9	0.14
Total votes		6,249	100.00

===== Declared =====
- Greg Smith, incumbent
- Raymond Akers

==== Democratic primary ====
Democratic primary results
Party	Candidate	Votes	%
Republican	Greg Smith (write-in)	101	37.13
Write-in		171	62.87
Total votes		272	100.00

===== General =====
General election results
Party	Candidate	Votes	%
Republican	Greg Smith	19,728	97.58
Write-in		489	2.42
Total votes		20,217	100.00

=== District 58 ===
==== Republican primary ====
Republican primary results
Party	Candidate	Votes	%
Republican	Bobby Levy	8,834	99.43
Write-in		51	0.57
Total votes		8,885	100.00

===== Declared =====
- Bobby Levy, incumbent

==== Democratic primary ====
Democratic primary results
Party	Candidate	Votes	%
Republican	Bobby Levy (write-in)	111	32.55
Write-in		230	67.45
Total votes		341	100.00

===== General =====
General election results
Party	Candidate	Votes	%
Republican	Bobby Levy	26,477	98.23
Write-in		476	1.77
Total votes		26,953	100.00

=== District 59 ===
==== Republican primary ====
Republican primary results
Party	Candidate	Votes	%
Republican	Vikki Breese-Iverson	9,803	88.92
Republican	Joseph M. Goodwin	838	7.60
Republican	Austyn Goody	348	3.16
Write-in		36	0.33
Total votes		8,885	100.00

===== Declared =====
- Vikki Breese-Iverson, incumbent
- Joseph M. Goodwin
- Austyn Goody

==== Democratic primary ====
Democratic primary results
Party	Candidate	Votes	%
Democratic	Brian K. Samp	3,207	97.48
Write-in		83	2.52
Total votes		3,290	100.00

===== Declared =====
- Brian K. Samp

===== General =====
General election results
Party	Candidate	Votes	%
Republican	Vikki Breese-Iverson	29,431	71.62
Democratic	Brian K. Samp	11,561	28.13
Write-in		100	0.24
Total votes		41,092	100.00

=== District 60 ===
==== Republican primary ====
Republican primary results
Party	Candidate	Votes	%
Republican	Mark Owens	8,797	99.43
Write-in		50	0.57
Total votes		8,847	100.00

===== Declared =====
- Mark Owens, incumbent

==== Democratic primary ====
Democratic primary results
Party	Candidate	Votes	%
Republican	Mark Owens (write-in)	71	32.72
Write-in		146	67.28
Total votes		217	100.00

===== General =====
General election results
Party	Candidate	Votes	%
Republican	Mark Owens	25,928	98.79
Write-in		318	1.21
Total votes		26,246	100.00

== See also ==
- 2024 Oregon Senate election
- 2024 Oregon elections
