= Katie Eyre Brewer =

American politician

Member of the Oregon House of Representatives from the 29th district
- In office January 2011 – January 14, 2013
- Preceded by: Chuck Riley
- Succeeded by: Ben Unger

Personal details
- Party: Republican
- Education: California State University, Northridge (BS)

Katie Eyre Brewer is an American politician and accountant in Oregon. She was elected to the Oregon House of Representatives in November 2010 for House District 29, succeeding Democratic Representative Chuck Riley. She lost to Ben Unger in the 2012 general election. Now known as Katie Eyre, she serves on the Hillsboro Planning Commission.

== Early life ==
Katie Eyre attended high school in Milford, Pennsylvania, and graduated from Delaware Valley High School. She graduated from California State University, Northridge with a bachelor of science degree in Accounting. A Certified Public Accountant, she was married to Bill Brewer and has five children, working as an accountant and tax adviser for Harsch Investments.

== Political career ==
A resident of Hillsboro, Oregon, she filed to run for the Oregon Legislature in June 2010 as a Republican for House District 29. In November 2010, she defeated Democrat Katie Riley with 9,035 votes to 8,009 to win the seat to replace Chuck Riley. Chuck Riley, Katie Riley's husband, had declined to run for re-election for the seat to run for a seat in the Oregon State Senate. Prior to her run for the House, she served on the Hillsboro Planning Commission where she helped save a heart attack victim's life by performing CPR at a meeting of the commission in November 2010.

During the 2011 session she served as vice-chairperson of the revenue committee and was also a vice-chairperson on a ways and means subcommittee. Brewer declined to run for Congress in August 2011 in the special election to replace David Wu who had resigned. She divorced during the session and changed her name to Katie Eyre. While in the House she was an opponent of the Columbia River Crossing project to replace the Interstate Bridge between Portland and Vancouver. She lost her bid a re-election in November 2012, losing to Ben Unger. She then returned to the Hillsboro Planning Commission.

== Electoral history ==
2010 Oregon State Representative, 29th district
Party	Candidate	Votes	%
Republican	Katie Eyre Brewer	9,035	52.9
Democratic	Katie Riley	8,009	46.9
Write-in		42	0.2
Total votes		17,086	100%
