= Emerson Levy =

American attorney and politician

Member of the Oregon House of Representatives from the 53rd district
- Incumbent
- Assumed office January 9, 2023
- Preceded by: Jack Zika

Personal details
- Party: Democratic
- Children: 1
- Education: Brigham Young University (BS); Whittier College (JD)
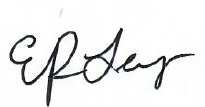
- Signature

Emerson Levy is an American attorney and politician serving as a member of the Oregon House of Representatives for the 53rd district. Elected in November 2022, she assumed office on January 9, 2023.

== Education ==
Levy earned a Bachelor of Science degree in international business from Brigham Young University and a Juris Doctor from Whittier Law School.

== Career ==
Outside of politics, Levy works as a self-employed renewable energy attorney. From 2017 to 2020, she was a real estate due diligence consultant at Sustainable Capital Finance. Levy was elected to the Oregon House of Representatives in November 2022.

== Electoral history ==
2020 Oregon State Representative, 53rd district
Party	Candidate	Votes	%
Republican	Jack Zika	27,442	57.1
Democratic	Emerson Levy	20,569	42.8
Write-in		72	0.1
Total votes		48,083	100%

2022 Oregon State Representative, 53rd district
Party	Candidate	Votes	%
Democratic	Emerson Levy	19,584	50.6
Republican	Michael Sipe	19,075	49.3
Write-in		35	0.1
Total votes		38,694	100%

2024 Oregon State Representative, 53rd district
Party	Candidate	Votes	%
Democratic	Emerson Levy	23,866	54.2
Republican	Keri Lopez	20,082	45.6
Write-in		46	0.1
Total votes		43,994	100%
