= Hoa Nguyen (politician) =

American politician (1983-2025)

Member of the Oregon House of Representatives from the 48th district
- In office January 9, 2023 – October 9, 2025
- Preceded by: Jeff Reardon
- Succeeded by: Lamar Wise

Personal details
- Born: December 23, 1983 New Orleans, Louisiana, U.S.
- Died: October 9, 2025 (aged 41) Portland, Oregon, U.S.
- Party: Democratic
- Education: Portland State University (BA)
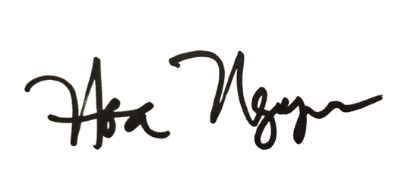
- Signature

Hiền Hòa Nguyễn (December 23, 1983 – October 9, 2025) was an American politician serving as a member of the Oregon House of Representatives for the 48th district. Elected in November 2022, she assumed office on January 9, 2023.

== Early life and education ==
Nguyen was born and raised in New Orleans, the daughter of Vietnamese immigrants. At the age of 15, she relocated to Portland, Oregon, where she graduated from St. Mary's Academy in 2003. Nguyen earned a Bachelor of Arts degree in sociology from Portland State University in 2008.

== Career ==
From 2008 to 2010, Nguyen worked as an extended day coordinator for the Metropolitan Family Service and Neighborhood House. Nguyen later worked as a school attendance case manager and school program manager for Neighborhood House. From 2015 to 2022, she served as a school attendance coach for Portland Public Schools. Nguyen joined the Clackamas Education Service District in August 2022 as a student and community engagement specialist. She was elected to the Oregon House of Representatives in November 2022.

== Illness and death ==
Nguyen was diagnosed with stage IV cancer in February 2025. She died later that year, on October 9, at the age of 41.

== Electoral history ==
2022 Oregon State Representative, 48th district
Party	Candidate	Votes	%
Democratic	Hoa H Nguyen	12,329	51.2
Republican	John Masterman	11,712	48.7
Write-in		20	0.1
Total votes		24,061	100%

2024 Oregon State Representative, 48th district
Party	Candidate	Votes	%
Democratic	Hoa H Nguyen	14,451	52.9
Republican	John Masterman	12,773	46.8
Write-in		69	0.3
Total votes		27,293	100%
