= Mary Gallegos =

American politician

Member of the Oregon House of Representatives from the 29th district
- In office 2003–2005
- Preceded by: Donna G. Nelson
- Succeeded by: Chuck Riley

Personal details
- Party: Republican

Mary Gallegos is an American Republican politician who served in the Oregon House of Representatives from 2003 until 2005.

== Career ==
Gallegos was first elected to the legislature in 2002, defeating Democrat Chuck Riley. The 29th district covers the cities of Forest Grove and Cornelius, and part of Hillsboro. She lost reelection to Riley in 2004.

== Personal life ==
Gallegos is a member of The Church of Jesus Christ of Latter-day Saints.
