= Brian Stout =

American politician

Member of the Oregon House of Representatives from the 31st district
- In office January 9, 2023 – January 13, 2025
- Preceded by: Brad Witt
- Succeeded by: Darcey Edwards

Personal details
- Born: Dallas, Texas, U.S.
- Party: Republican
- Spouse: Nancy Stout
- Children: 2
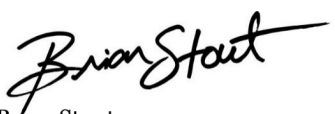
- Signature

Brian Stout is an American politician who served as a member of the Oregon House of Representatives from the 31st district from 2023 until 2025. Stout was elected in 2022 and announced that he would not run for re-election in 2024.

== Early life and education ==
Stout was born in Dallas, Texas. After moving to Oregon, he attended Hillsboro High School, graduating in 1986. He studied graphic design at Portland State University.

== Legislative career ==
=== Oregon House of Representatives ===
Stout was the 2020 Republican nominee to represent the 31st district in the Oregon House of Representatives. He lost the general election to incumbent Brad Witt by 511 votes.

Stout ran for the same seat in 2022, defeating the Democratic nominee, Anthony Sorace. Stout was sworn in on January 9, 2023. He served on the Committee on Business and Labor and the Committee on Economic Development and Small Businesses.

=== Sexual abuse allegation ===
On November 7, 2022, a Columbia County Circuit Court judge granted a five-year protective order against Brian Stout when a woman filed a petition alleging sexual abuse.

On January 16, 2023, Stout was removed from his committee assignments.

On April 28, 2023, after a three-day hearing, the Columbia County Circuit Court judge ruled against Stout's request to dismiss the restraining order.

On May 9, 2023, House Speaker Dan Rayfield called on Stout to resign saying, "He can make the decisions on how he wants to operate in this world and whether he chooses to stay or not, and allow the voters to make the ultimate decision in two years if he chooses to run."

On February 8, 2024, Stout announced that he would not be running for re-election. He endorsed Darcey Edwards in the 2024 election.

== Personal life ==
Stout has been married to his wife Nancy for over 30 years. They have two daughters and one grandson.

== Election history ==
2020 Oregon House of Representatives 31st district Republican primary
Party	Candidate	Votes	%
Republican	Brian Stout	6,056	86.6
Republican	William Spencer	879	12.6
Republican	Write-in	61	0.9
Total votes		6,996	100.0

2020 Oregon House of Representatives 31st district election
Party	Candidate	Votes	%
Democratic	Brad Witt (incumbent)	21,536	50.5
Republican	Brian Stout	21,025	49.3
Write-in		59	0.1
Total votes		42,620	100.0

2022 Oregon House of Representatives 31st district Republican primary
Party	Candidate	Votes	%
Republican	Brian Stout	4,756	63.3
Republican	Drew Layda	2,720	36.2
Republican	Write-in	36	0.5
Total votes		7,512	100.0

2022 Oregon House of Representatives 31st district election
Party	Candidate	Votes	%
Republican	Brian Stout	19,666	59.2
Democratic	Anthony Sorace	13,492	40.6
Write-in		75	0.2
Total votes		33,233	100.0
