= Oregon's 12th House district =

Legislative districts in the state of Oregon

Oregon's 12th House district after redistricting after the 2020 Census

District 12 of the Oregon House of Representatives is one of 60 House legislative districts in the state of Oregon. As of 2021, the boundary for the district includes most of eastern Lane County as well as a small sliver of southern Linn County. The current representative for the district is Republican Darin Harbick of McKenzie Bridge.

== Election results ==
District boundaries have changed over time. Therefore, representatives before 2021 may not represent the same constituency as today. General election results from 2000 to present are as follows:

Year	Candidate	Party	Percent	Opponent	Party	Percent	Opponent	Party	Percent	Write-in percentage
2000	Chris Beck	Democratic	72.94%	Jeanne Schoel	Republican	21.73%	Joe Tabor	Libertarian	5.33%	
2002 (Note: Elizabeth Terry Beyer was the incumbent in this election. She was appointed on November 5, 2001 by Governor John Kitzhaber to represent District 42. The previous incumbent, Bill Morrissette, resigned to take an appointment to the 6th district seat in the Oregon Senate. In addition, she was moved to this district due to redistricting following the 2000 United States census.)	Elizabeth Terry Beyer	Democratic	53.10%	Norm Fox	Republican	46.87%	No third candidate			0.03%
2004	Elizabeth Terry Beyer	Democratic	96.70%	Unopposed						3.30%
2006	Elizabeth Terry Beyer	Democratic	64.41%	Bill Lioio	Republican	35.59%	No third candidate			
2008	Elizabeth Terry Beyer	Democratic	65.84%	Sean Van Gordon	Republican	33.60%	No third candidate			0.56%
2010	Elizabeth Terry Beyer	Democratic	56.61%	Sean Van Gordon	Republican	43.07%	No third candidate			0.33%
2012	John Lively	Democratic	53.74%	Joe Pishioneri	Republican	45.94%	No third candidate			0.32%
2014	John Lively	Democratic	64.33%	Christopher Gergen	Republican	35.27%	No third candidate			0.40%
2016	John Lively	Democratic	62.27%	Robert Schwartz	Republican	37.36%	No third candidate			0.37%
2018	John Lively	Democratic	95.23%	Unopposed						4.77%
2020	John Lively	Democratic	56.61%	Ruth Linoz	Republican	43.11%	No third candidate			0.28%
2022	Charlie Conrad	Republican	57.46%	Michelle Emmons	Democratic	42.43%	No third candidate			0.11%
2024	Darin Harbick	Republican	57.66%	Michelle Emmons	Democratic	42.18%	No third candidate			0.15%

== See also ==
- Oregon Legislative Assembly
- Oregon House of Representatives
