= Charlie Conrad =

American politician (born 1969)

Member of the Oregon House of Representatives from the 12th district
- In office January 9, 2023 – January 13, 2025
- Preceded by: John Lively
- Succeeded by: Darin Harbick

Personal details
- Born: December 31, 1969 (age 56) Corvallis, Oregon, U.S.
- Party: Republican (before 2024); Independent (2024–present)
- Spouse: Andee Conrad
- Children: 1
- Education: Oregon State University (BS); University of Colorado (MPA)
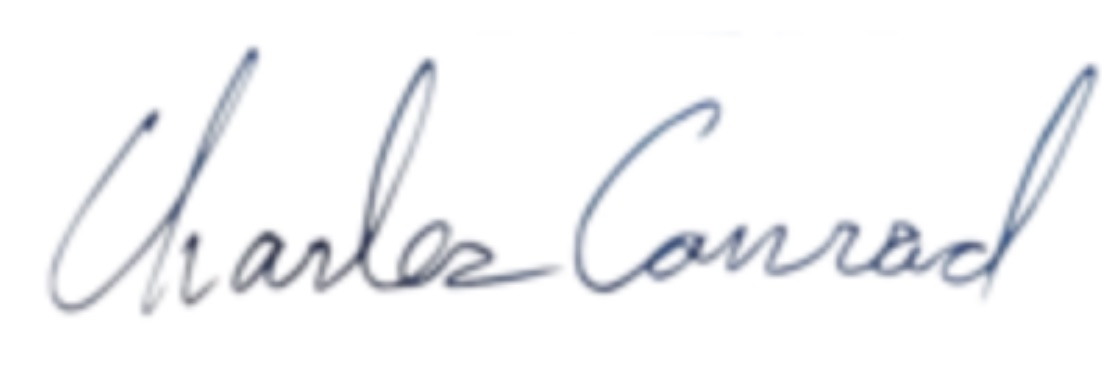
- Signature

Charlie Conrad is an American Independent politician who represented the 12th district of the Oregon House of Representatives from 2023 to 2025. He won the seat in the 2022 election against Michelle Emmons. Formerly a member of the Republican Party, he changed his party registration in June 2024.

== Career ==
Conrad served on the Springfield Police Department as a police officer and detective. He then became a research coordinator for the League of Oregon Cities. He then worked at Parks and Lane Events Center in Lane County.

=== Oregon House of Representatives ===
Conrad serves on three committees: Behavioral Health and Health Care, Emergency Management General Government and Veterans, and Judiciary.

In 2023, Conrad was the only Republican in the Oregon Legislature to vote for a bill expanding access to abortion and gender affirming care. In 2024, he faced a primary challenge from businessman Darin Harbick. He did not receive support from the state House Republican caucus or the Oregon Republican Party's campaign arm in the 2024 primary.

In June 2024, after losing renomination in the Republican primary election to Harbick, Conrad changed his party registration to the Independent Party of Oregon.

== Personal life ==
Born in Corvallis, Oregon, Conrad resides in Dexter, Oregon.

== Electoral history ==
2022 Oregon State Representative, 12th district
Party	Candidate	Votes	%
Republican	Charlie Conrad	20,410	57.5
Democratic	Michelle Emmons	15,073	42.4
Write-in		40	0.1
Total votes		35,523	100%
