= Mike Schaufler =

American politician

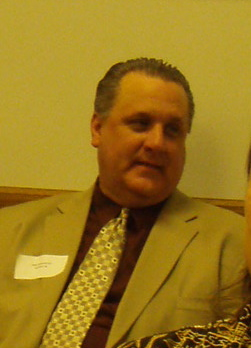

Member of the Oregon House of Representatives from the 48th district
- In office 2003–2013
- Succeeded by: Jeff Reardon

Personal details
- Born: November 24, 1959 (age 66) Buffalo, Minnesota
- Party: Democratic
- Education: University of Iowa
- Occupation: business owner

Mike Schaufler is a former Democratic member of the Oregon House of Representatives who represented District 48 from 2003 to 2013.

== Early life ==
After growing up and graduating from high school in Webster City, Iowa, Schaufler developed an early interest in politics. He was an active participant in student council throughout his time in school, ultimately attending the University of Iowa to pursue a B.A. in Political Science. Upon completing his bachelor's degree in 1984, he moved to Oregon in 1988.

== Career ==
After arriving in Oregon, Schaufler worked as a Laborers' Union member, rank and file, from 1988–1996. Since 1996, Schaufler has successfully operated his own small business, working as a contractor.

Prior to his 2002 election to the Oregon House of Representatives Schaufler served in the following positions:

- Happy Valley City Council 1997-2000
- Happy Valley Transportation Advisory Committee 1996
- Metro's Joint Policy Advisory Committee on Transportation, Alternate
- Clackamas County Concurrency Project, Transportation
- League of Oregon Cities General Government Committee
- Happy Valley Budget Committee
- Happy Valley Planning Commission
- Sunrise Water Authority Budget Committee

== Controversies ==
In the fall of 2011, Schaufler was accused of groping a woman's breast at an AFL-CIO convention held in Eugene, Oregon. The incident was publicized in Oregon's premier newspaper, The Oregonian, and Schaufler's behavior was referred to as "highly inappropriate" by the State Labor Commissioner Brad Avakian. Schaufler later denied the incident by written statement, explaining, "A campaign worker and colleague of mine stuck a campaign sticker on my chest without my permission. I reacted by taking the sticker off of my chest and sticking it on her chest." Schaufler further described the incident as "innocent horseplay" and a "knee-jerk response."

Schaufler was also criticized for his record of siding with Republicans on various issues in the legislature, including stalling a healthcare bill. During Schaufler's campaign for the 2012 primary election, he was further criticized for accepting a $3,000 donation from the conservative Koch Industries, although Schaufler later returned the money after public backlash.

== Electoral history ==
2004 Oregon State Representative, 48th district
Party	Candidate	Votes	%
Democratic	Mike Schaufler	12,084	51.2
Republican	Dave Mowry	11,388	48.2
Write-in		133	0.6
Total votes		23,605	100%

2006 Oregon State Representative, 48th district
Party	Candidate	Votes	%
Democratic	Mike Schaufler	11,262	74.3
Constitution	N.W. (Bill) Stallings	3,672	24.2
Write-in		232	1.5
Total votes		15,166	100%

2008 Oregon State Representative, 48th district
Party	Candidate	Votes	%
Democratic	Mike Schaufler	15,156	95.8
Write-in		672	4.2
Total votes		15,828	100%

2010 Oregon State Representative, 48th district
Party	Candidate	Votes	%
Democratic	Mike Schaufler	9,719	56.9
Independent	Jeff Caton	7,246	42.4
Write-in		128	0.7
Total votes		17,093	100%
