= Chuck Riley (politician) =

American politician

Member of the Oregon Senate from the 15th district
- In office January 12, 2015 – January 21, 2022
- Preceded by: Bruce Starr
- Succeeded by: Janeen Sollman

Member of the Oregon House of Representatives from the 29th district
- In office January 10, 2005 – January 11, 2011
- Preceded by: Mary Gallegos
- Succeeded by: Katie Eyre Brewer

Personal details
- Born: May 31, 1939 (age 87) Illinois, U.S.
- Party: Democratic
- Spouse: Katie Riley
- Website: www.leg.state.or.us/riley/

Military service
- Branch/service: United States Air Force

Chuck Riley (born May 31, 1939) is an American politician who served as a member of the Oregon State Senate for the 15th district, which includes Hillsboro, Forest Grove, and Cornelius in western Washington County. He served three terms in the Oregon House of Representatives from 2005 to 2011.

Riley was the Democratic nominee for Senate District 15 in 2010, losing to incumbent state senator Bruce Starr. However, Riley prevailed in a rematch against Starr in 2014, winning in the tightest Oregon legislative election of the year.

== Early life and education ==
Chuck Riley the son of Oscar Edwin Riley and Jessie May (Spangler) Riley was born in 1939 in Illinois where he grew up on his father's farm. In 1957, he graduated from Mount Vernon High School in Mount Vernon before enrolling in college. He took some classes at the University of Illinois, majoring in mathematics, before enlisting in the United States Air Force in 1958. Riley remained in the Air Force until 1961 and spent some time at the Army Language School learning Russian. He later attended Southern Illinois University as an art major and worked for the school before moving to California, where he worked at the Jet Propulsion Lab and for Santa Barbara County. After moving to Oregon, Riley enrolled at Portland State University, where he majored in art.

== Career ==
In 1979, he moved to Oregon and settled in Washington County west of Portland. He moved to Hillsboro in 1992 and worked for First Interstate Bank as a systems analyst. Riley also worked in the same position with Blue Cross of Oregon. He later ran his own computer consulting business.

=== Oregon House of Representatives ===
In 2000, Riley enter politics and ran for a seat on the Hillsboro City Council, losing to incumbent Karen McKinney. The following year he ran for a seat in the Oregon House of Representatives as a Democrat to represent District 29, running unopposed in the primary election. In the November general election he lost to Republican Mary Gallegos by a total of 434 votes. In May 2004, Riley defeated Elena Uhing in the Democratic primary for the same district. Riley then defeated Gallegos in the November 2004 election for the same seat.

In 2006, he faced off against Terry Rilling in the district that has more Democratic voters than Republicans. Riley won with 55% of the vote to Rilling's 45% in the November election. In the 2007-08 Legislature, Riley was chairman of the Government Accountability and Information Technology Committee in the House. During the 2008 special session he also served on the Consumer Protection and the Workforce and Economic Development committees.

Riley faced Rilling again in the November 2008 election for the House seat after Republican primary winner Jeff Duyck was later declared ineligible. Duyck's property spans two districts and the county elections office miscalculated where he was registered to vote and thus which seat he was eligible to run for.

=== Oregon Senate ===
In 2009, he announced he would run for a seat in the Oregon State Senate in 2010, challenging incumbent Republican Bruce Starr in District 15. Riley lost to Starr, and in 2011 ran for a seat on the school board for Portland Community College, losing in May to Deanna Palm.

In 2014, Riley ran again for the Oregon Senate against Starr. The contest was one of the most expensive legislative races in the state and was decided by the closest vote margin, with Riley edging out Starr by just a few hundred votes. He was sworn into the Senate on January 12, 2015, and serves on the Senate Committee on Business and Transportation, the Senate Committee on Finance and Revenue, the Joint Committee on Tax Credits, and the Joint Committee on Audits. Additionally, he serves as co-chair of the Ways and Means Subcommittee on Information Technology.

In April 2015, gun rights activists filed a recall petition against Riley. The recall was initiated over Riley's support for "mandatory vaccinations, repealing the gain share tax, increasing the minimum wage, background checks for private gun sales and voting to under-fund the state education system." The recall effort was dropped when organizers could not collect sufficient signatures to place the recall question on the ballot.

On Jan 9, 2017 Riley sponsored SB115 in the Senate. The bill would have banned the sale of leaded aviation fuel in Oregon, starting in 2020.

== Personal life ==
Riley to Katie Riley, who teaches at Oregon Health & Science University. They have four children.

== Electoral history ==
2004 Oregon State Representative, 29th district
Party	Candidate	Votes	%
Democratic	Chuck Riley	9,588	48.0
Republican	Mary Gallegos	8,427	42.2
Libertarian	Tom Cox	1,909	9.6
Write-in		56	0.3
Total votes		19,980	100%

2006 Oregon State Representative, 29th district
Party	Candidate	Votes	%
Democratic	Chuck Riley	7,987	51.7
Republican	Terry Rilling	6,659	43.1
Libertarian	Scott Harwood	769	5.0
Write-in		34	0.2
Total votes		15,449	100%

2008 Oregon State Representative, 29th district
Party	Candidate	Votes	%
Democratic	Chuck Riley	11,191	60.0
Independent	Terry L Rilling	7,321	39.2
Write-in		146	0.8
Total votes		18,658	100%

2010 Oregon State Senator, 15th district
Party	Candidate	Votes	%
Republican	Bruce Starr	21,382	52.1
Democratic	Chuck Riley	19,533	47.6
Write-in		120	0.3
Total votes		41,035	100%

2014 Oregon State Senator, 15th district
Party	Candidate	Votes	%
Democratic	Chuck Riley	18,156	45.7
Republican	Bruce Starr	17,869	45.0
Libertarian	Caitlin Mitchel-Markley	3,593	9.0
Write-in		116	0.3
Total votes		39,734	100%

2018 Oregon State Senator, 15th district
Party	Candidate	Votes	%
Democratic	Chuck Riley	30,770	59.3
Republican	Alexander Flores	21,037	40.5
Write-in		114	0.2
Total votes		51,921	100%
