= Peter J. Buckley =

American politician

Peter Buckley
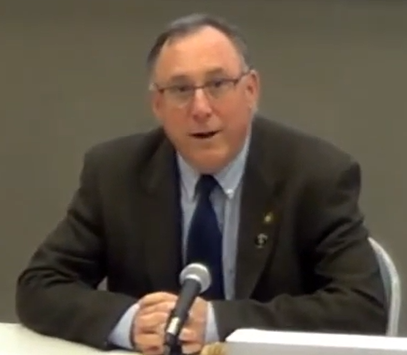
- Buckley in 2015

Member of the Oregon House of Representatives from the 5th district
- In office January 2005 – January 9, 2017
- Preceded by: Alan Bates
- Succeeded by: Pam Marsh

Personal details
- Born: May 10, 1957 (age 69) San Francisco
- Party: Democratic
- Spouse: Joan Langley
- Children: 3
- Education: University of Santa Clara
- Website: Legislative website

Peter J. Buckley (born May 10, 1957) is a Democratic politician from the U.S. State of Oregon. He represented District 5, consisting of Ashland, Phoenix, Talent, Jacksonville, Ruch and Applegate, in the Oregon House of Representatives. Buckley was first elected in 2004 and served until 2017. He served on the Education Committee (chair), the Education Subcommittee On Education Innovation, the Education Subcommittee On Higher Education (chair), the Elections, Ethics and Rules Committee (Vice-chair), and the Transportation Committee.

== Early life and career ==
Born in San Francisco, California, Buckley received a Bachelor of Fine Arts degree from the University of Santa Clara in 1979. Buckley worked for more than 20 years in non-profit management. He turned the financially struggling Ferndale Repertory Theater into a successful local art center, adding staff and health care benefits for the first time in the organization's history. He worked to improve cultural tourism and create jobs in Humboldt County as an extension of his work with the Dell’Arte International school of theater arts.

He also worked on the nationally recognized Arts Plus programs for K-8 classrooms through work with the National Endowment for the Arts in Washington, D.C., and with the Boys & Girls Club, Hospice of Humboldt, KEET-TV (PBS), KHSU (NPR), Humboldt Senior Center, Arcata Children's Center, Pacific Art Center, the Ink People, and Head Start to raise funds. For 15 years, Buckley has been a political commentator for NPR affiliates, including Jefferson Public Radio.

== Political career ==
In 2002, as a Democrat, he ran unsuccessfully for U.S. Congress representing Oregon's 2nd congressional district against incumbent Republican Greg Walden. In 2004, he was elected to an open seat in the Oregon House of Representatives, and was re-elected in 2006 and 2008.

== Personal life ==
A resident of Ashland, Buckley is married to Joan Langley and has three sons.
