= 82nd Oregon Legislative Assembly =

2023-25 Legislative session of the Oregon Legislative Assembly

←	81st Legislative Assembly	83rd Legislative Assembly	→
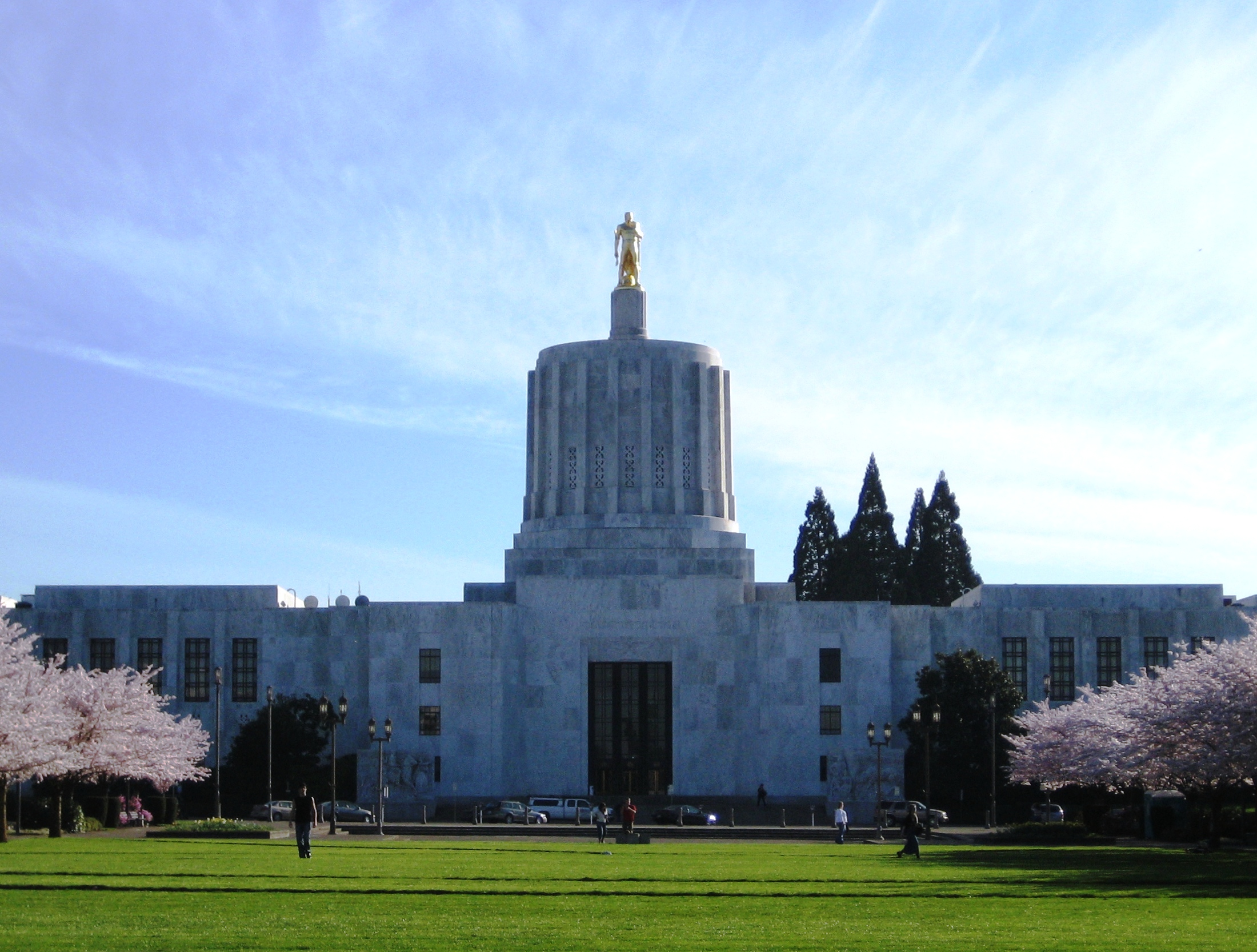
- The legislature took place in the Oregon State Capitol, seen here in 2007

Overview
- Legislative body: Oregon Legislative Assembly
- Jurisdiction: Oregon, United States
- Meeting place: Oregon State Capitol
- Term: 2023–2025
- Website: www.oregonlegislature.gov

Oregon State Senate
- Members: 30 Senators
- Senate President: Rob Wagner (D)
- Majority Leader: Kathleen Taylor (D)
- Minority Leader: Daniel Bonham (R)
- Party control: Democratic

Oregon House of Representatives
- Members: 60 Representatives
- Speaker of the House: Julie Fahey (D)
- Majority Leader: Ben Bowman (D)
- Minority Leader: Jeff Helfrich (R)
- Party control: Democratic

The 82nd Oregon Legislative Assembly was the a session of the Oregon Legislature. It began January 9, 2023 and adjourned June 25, 2023.

The Democratic Party of Oregon held a majority in both chambers, but no longer held a supermajority. Democrats lost one senate seat in the 2022 Oregon State Senate election, resulting in a 17–13 majority, and lost two seats in the 2022 Oregon House of Representatives election, resulting in a 35–25 majority.

== Senate ==
The Oregon State Senate is composed of 17 Democrats and 13 Republicans.

Senate President: Rob Wagner (D-19 Lake Oswego)
President Pro Tempore: James Manning Jr. (D–7 Eugene)
Majority Leader: Kate Lieber (D-14 Beaverton) until July 15, 2024; Kathleen Taylor (D-21 Portland) after
Minority Leader: Tim Knopp (R-27 Bend) until April 15, 2024; Daniel Bonham (R-26 The Dalles) after

Composition of the Oregon State Senate 2022 (bolded districts are flips)

District	Senator	Party	Committee Assignments	Residence	Assumed office
1	Dallas Heard (Note: Resigned January 1, 2023.)	Republican		Roseburg	2018 (Note: Senator was originally appointed.)
1	David Brock Smith	Republican		Port Orford	2023
2	Art Robinson	Republican		Cave Junction	2021
3	Jeff Golden	Democratic		Ashland	2019
4	Floyd Prozanski	Democratic		Eugene	2003
5	Dick Anderson	Republican		Lincoln City	2021
6	Cedric Hayden	Republican		Fall Creek	2023
7	James Manning Jr.	Democratic		Eugene	2017
8	Sara Gelser	Democratic		Corvallis	2015
9	Fred Girod	Republican		Stayton	2008
10	Deb Patterson	Democratic		Salem	2021
11	Kim Thatcher	Republican		Keizer	2015
12	Brian Boquist	Independent		Dallas	2009
12	Brian Boquist	Republican		Dallas	2009
13	Aaron Woods	Democratic		Wilsonville	2023
14	Kate Lieber	Democratic		Beaverton	2021
15	Janeen Sollman	Democratic		Hillsboro	2022
16	Suzanne Weber	Republican		Tillamook	2023
17	Elizabeth Steiner	Democratic		Portland	2012
18	Wlnsvey Campos	Democratic		Aloha	2023
19	Rob Wagner	Democratic		Lake Oswego	2018
20	Mark Meek	Democratic		Gladstone	2023
21	Kathleen Taylor	Democratic		Portland	2017
22	Lew Frederick	Democratic		Portland	2017
23	Michael Dembrow	Democratic		Portland	2013
24	Kayse Jama	Democratic		Portland	2021
25	Chris Gorsek	Democratic		Troutdale	2021
26	Daniel Bonham	Republican		The Dalles	2023
27	Tim Knopp	Republican		Bend	2013
28	Dennis Linthicum	Republican		Klamath Falls	2017
29	Bill Hansell	Republican		Athena	2013
30	Lynn Findley	Republican		Vale	2020

=== Committee assignments ===
Senators are each assigned to one or more committees.

Conduct

- Dick Anderson - Co-Chair
- Floyd Prozanski – Co-Chair
- Suzanne Weber
- Aaron Woods
- Michael Dembrow
- Lynn Findley
- Jeff Golden
- Bill Hansell
- Tim Knopp
- Deb Patterson

Education

- Michael Dembrow – Chair
- Suzanne Weber – Vice-Chair
- Dick Anderson
- Lew Frederick
- Sara Gelser Blouin
- Art Robinson
- Rob Wagner

Energy and Environment

- Janeen Sollman – Chair
- Lynn Findley – Vice-Chair
- Jeff Golden
- Cedric Hayden
- Kate Lieber

Finance and Revenue

- Mark Meek – Chair
- Brian Boquist – Vice-Chair
- Lynn Findley
- Jeff Golden
- Kayse Jama

Health Care

- Deb Patterson – Chair
- Cedric Hayden – Vice-Chair
- Daniel Bonham
- Wlnsvey Campos
- Chris Gorsek

Housing and Development

- Kayse Jama – Chair
- Dick Anderson – Vice-Chair
- Tim Knopp
- Deb Patterson
- Janeen Sollman

Human Services

- Sara Gelser Blouin – Chair
- Art Robinson – Vice-Chair
- James Manning Jr.
- Floyd Prozanski
- Suzanne Weber

Judiciary

- Floyd Prozanski – Chair
- Kim Thatcher – Vice-Chair
- Michael Dembrow
- Sara Gelser Blouin
- Dennis Linthicum
- James Manning Jr.

Labor and Business

- Kathleen Taylor – Chair
- Daniel Bonham – Vice-Chair
- Bill Hansell
- Kayse Jama
- Deb Patterson

Natural Resources

- Jeff Golden – Chair
- Fred Girod – Vice-Chair
- Floyd Prozanski
- David Brock Smith
- Kathleen Taylor

Rules

- Kate Lieber – Chair
- Tim Knopp – Vice-Chair
- Bill Hansell
- James Manning Jr.
- Elizabeth Steiner

Veterans, Emergency Management, Federal and World Affairs

- James Manning Jr. - Chair
- Kim Thatcher – Vice-Chair
- Chris Gorsek
- Art Robinson
- Aaron Woods

=== Events ===
To prevent passage of bills related to abortion and gun control by the Democratic majority, ten Republican senators took advantage of the quorum requirement in the Oregon Constitution that requires two-thirds of senators be present and did not attend sessions for six weeks, preventing any Senate business from occurring. This action triggered Oregon Ballot Measure 113, passed by voters in 2022, which disqualifies members with ten unexcused absences from serving in the legislature following their current term. The Democratic leadership eventually made concessions to the bills to allow the session to resume.

== House ==
The Oregon House of Representatives is composed of 35 Democrats and 25 Republicans. Republicans gained one seat from the previous session.

Oregon House of Representatives 2022 Election Results

Speaker: Dan Rayfield (D-16 Corvallis) until March 7, 2024; Julie Fahey (D-14 Eugene) after
Speaker Pro Tempore: Paul Holvey (D-8 Eugene)
Majority Leader: Julie Fahey (D-14 Eugene) until March 21, 2024; Ben Bowman (D-25 Tigard) after
Minority Leader: Vikki Breese-Iverson (R-59 Prineville) until September 26, 2023; Jeff Helfrich (R-52 Hood River) after

District	Representative	Party	Committee Assignments	Residence	Assumed office
1	David Brock Smith (Note: Resigned January 13, 2023 after being appointed to the Senate.)	Republican		Port Orford	2017
1	Court Boice	Republican		Gold Beach	2023 (Note: Representative was originally appointed.)
2	Virgle Osborne	Republican		Roseburg	2023
3	Lily Morgan (Note: Resigned December 3, 2023 after being hired as city manager of Gold Hill.)	Republican		Grants Pass	2021
3	Dwayne Yunker	Republican		Grants Pass	2023
4	Christine Goodwin	Republican		Roseburg	2021
5	Pam Marsh	Democratic		Ashland	2017
6	Kim Wallan	Republican		Medford	2019
7	John Lively	Democratic		Springfield	2013
8	Paul Holvey	Democratic		Eugene	2004
9	Boomer Wright	Republican		Coos Bay	2021
10	David Gomberg	Democratic		Neotsu	2013
11	Jami Cate	Republican		Lebanon	2021
12	Charlie Conrad	Republican		Dexter	2009
12	Charlie Conrad	Independent (Note: Conrad changed his party affiliation to Independent on June 20, 2024.)		Dexter	2009
13	Nancy Nathanson	Democratic		Eugene	2007
14	Julie Fahey	Democratic		Eugene	2017
15	Shelly Boshart Davis	Republican		Albany	2019
16	Dan Rayfield	Democratic		Corvallis	2015
17	Ed Diehl	Republican		Stayton	2023
18	Rick Lewis	Republican		Silverton	2017
19	Tom Andersen	Democratic		Salem	2023
20	Paul Evans	Democratic		Monmouth	2015
21	Kevin Mannix	Republican		Salem	2023 (Note: Previously served in House from 1989 to 2001.)
22	Tracy Cramer	Republican		Gervais	2023
23	Anna Scharf	Republican		Amity	2021
24	Lucetta Elmer	Republican		McMinnville	2023
25	Ben Bowman	Democratic		Tigard	2023
26	Courtney Neron	Democratic		Wilsonville	2019
27	Ken Helm	Democratic		Beaverton	2015
28	Dacia Grayber	Democratic		Tigard	2021
29	Susan McLain	Democratic		Forest Grove	2015
30	Nathan Sosa	Democratic		Hillsboro	2022
31	Brian Stout	Republican		Columbia City	2023
32	Cyrus Javadi	Republican		Tillamook	2021
33	Maxine Dexter (Note: Resigned August 30, 2024 to run for United States House of Representatives in Oregon's 3rd Congressional district.)	Democratic		Portland	2020
33	Shannon Jones Isadore	Democratic		Portland	2024
34	Lisa Reynolds	Democratic		Portland	2021
35	Farrah Chaichi	Democratic		Beaverton	2023
36	Hai Pham	Democratic		Hillsboro	2023
37	Jules Walters	Democratic		West Linn	2023
38	Daniel Nguyen	Democratic		Lake Oswego	2023
39	Janelle Bynum	Democratic		Happy Valley	2017
40	Annessa Hartman	Democratic		Gladstone	2023
41	Mark Gamba	Democratic		Milwaukie	2023
42	Rob Nosse	Democratic		Portland	2014
43	Tawna Sanchez	Democratic		Portland	2017
44	Travis Nelson	Democratic		Portland	2022
45	Thuy Tran	Democratic		Portland	2023
46	Khanh Pham	Democratic		Portland	2021
47	Andrea Valderrama	Democratic		Portland	2021
48	Hoa Nguyen	Democratic		Portland	2023
49	Zach Hudson	Democratic		Troutdale	2021
50	Ricki Ruiz	Democratic		Gresham	2021
51	James Hieb	Republican		Canby	2022
52	Jeff Helfrich	Republican		Hood River	2023 (Note: Previously served in House from 2017 to 2019.)
53	Emerson Levy	Democratic		Redmond	2023
54	Jason Kropf	Democratic		Bend	2021
55	E. Werner Reschke	Republican		Klamath Falls	2017
56	Emily McIntire	Republican		Eagle Point	2023
57	Greg Smith	Republican		Heppner	2001
58	Bobby Levy	Republican		Echo	2021
59	Vikki Breese-Iverson	Republican		Prineville	2019
60	Mark Owens	Republican		Crane	2020

== See also ==
- 2022 Oregon State Senate election
- 2022 Oregon House of Representatives election
