= 2024 Oregon State Senate election =

- November 5, 2024

15 of 30 seats in the Oregon State Senate 16 seats needed for a majority
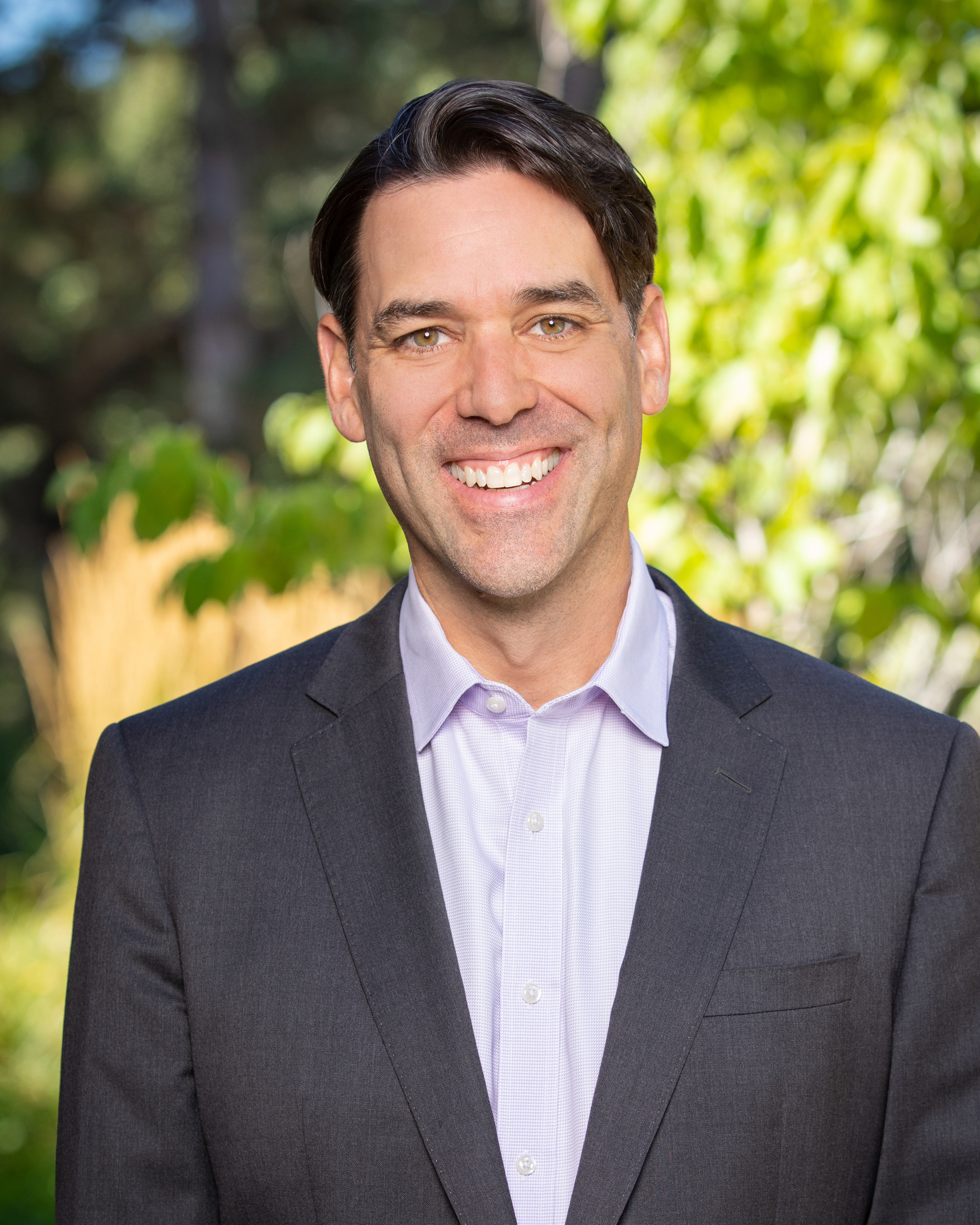

	Majority party	Minority party
Leader	Rob Wagner	Daniel Bonham
Party	Democratic	Republican
Leader since	January 9, 2023	April 15, 2024
Leader's seat	19–Lake Oswego	26–The Dalles
Last election	17 seats	12 seats
Seats won	18	12
Seat change	▲1	Steady
Popular vote	511,377	479,821
Percentage	49.90%	46.82%
- Democratic gain Democratic hold Republican hold No election 50–60% 60–70% 80–90% >90% 50–60% 60–70% 70–80% 80–90% >90%
President of the Senate before election
Rob Wagner
Democratic
Elected President of the Senate
Rob Wagner
Democratic

The 2024 Oregon State Senate election was held in the U.S. state of Oregon on November 5, 2024, to elect 15 of the 30 members of the State Senate to the 83rd Oregon Legislature.

Primary elections were held in several districts on May 21, 2024. The election coincided with the election of the other house of the Legislative Assembly, the Oregon House of Representatives, and other elections.

The Democrats regained the three-fifths supermajority in the Senate they had lost in the 2022 elections.

== Background ==
On August 8, 2023, Oregon Secretary of State LaVonne Griffin-Valade announced that as per the recently passed Oregon Ballot Measure 113, 10 Republican senators who participated in walkouts earlier in the year are not eligible for re-election for the next term. Six of these senators are up for election in 2024. Some of the senators filed a lawsuit against the secretary of state, with the Oregon Supreme Court eventually ruling unanimously that they could not be placed on the ballot in 2024 and 2026.

== Electoral system ==
The 15 members of the Senate up for election were elected from single-member districts via first-past-the-post voting for four-year terms.

Contested nominations of recognized major parties (Democratic and Republican) for each district were determined by a primary election on May 21, 2024.

Minor party candidates were nominated by petition. Write-in candidates must file a request with the Secretary of State's office for votes for them to be counted. Candidates for the state Senate in 2024 were required to file to run from September 14, 2023, to March 12, 2024.

== Predictions ==
Source	Ranking	As of
CNalysis	Solid D	March 25, 2024

== Outgoing incumbents ==
=== Democrats ===
- District 23: Michael Dembrow retired.

=== Republicans ===
- District 2: Art Robinson was barred from re-election.
- District 12: Brian Boquist was barred from re-election in the Senate, and ran for state treasurer instead.
- District 27: Tim Knopp, the former minority leader, was barred from re-election.
- District 28: Dennis Linthicum was barred from re-election in the Senate, and ran for secretary of state instead.
- District 29: Bill Hansell both retired and was barred from re-election.
- District 30: Lynn Findley both retired and was barred from re-election.

== Overview ==
Party	Candidates	Votes	%	Seats		
Party	Candidates	Votes	%	Before	After	+/−
Democratic	13	511,377	49.90%	17	18	▲1
Republican	12	479,821	46.82%	12	12	Steady
Independent	2	18,083	1.76%	0	0	Steady
Libertarian	1	10,149	0.99%	0	0	Steady
Write-in	–	5,339	0.52%	0	0	Steady
IPO	0	0	0.00%	1	0	▼1
Total	33	1,024,769	100.0%	30	30	±0

=== Summary by district ===
District	Incumbent	Party	Elected Senator	Party
1st	David Brock Smith	Rep	David Brock Smith	Rep
2nd	Art Robinson	Rep	Noah Robinson	Rep
5th	Dick Anderson	Rep	Dick Anderson	Rep
9th	Fred Girod	Rep	Fred Girod	Rep
12th	Brian Boquist	Rep	Bruce Starr	Rep
14th	Kate Lieber	Dem	Kate Lieber	Dem
18th	Wlnsvey Campos	Dem	Wlnsvey Campos	Dem
21st	Kathleen Taylor	Dem	Kathleen Taylor	Dem
22nd	Lew Frederick	Dem	Lew Frederick	Dem
23rd	Michael Dembrow	Dem	Khanh Pham	Dem
25th	Chris Gorsek	Dem	Chris Gorsek	Dem
27th	Tim Knopp	Rep	Anthony Broadman	Dem
28th	Dennis Linthicum	Rep	Diane Linthicum	Rep
29th	Bill Hansell	Rep	Todd Nash	Rep
30th	Lynn Findley	Rep	Mike McLane	Rep

== Detailed results ==
=== District 1 ===
==== Republican primary ====
Republican primary results
Party	Candidate	Votes	%
Republican	David Brock Smith (incumbent)	10,872	55.8
Republican	Todd J Vaughn	5,807	29.8
Republican	Paul J Romero Jr	1,636	8.4
Republican	Ashley Hicks	1,125	5.8
Write-in		55	0.3
Total votes		19,495	100.00

==== General election ====
Oregon's 1st Senate district results
Party	Candidate	Votes	%
Republican	David Brock Smith (incumbent)	54,925	70.8
Democratic	Lupe Preciado-McAlister	22,417	28.9
Write-in		254	0.3
Total votes		77,596	100.00
Republican hold			

=== District 2 ===
==== Republican primary ====
Republican primary results
Party	Candidate	Votes	%
Republican	Noah Robinson	13,228	61.1
Republican	Christine Goodwin	8,367	38.7
Write-in		51	0.2
Total votes		21,646	0.3

==== Democratic primary ====
Democratic primary results
Party	Candidate	Votes	%
Democratic	Tracy Thompson	6,047	97.4
Write-in		162	2.6
Total votes		6,209	100.00

==== General election ====
Oregon's 2nd Senate district results
Party	Candidate	Votes	%
Republican	Noah Robinson	50,872	66.9
Democratic	Tracy Thompson	25,040	32.9
Write-in		123	0.2
Total votes		76,035	100.00
Republican hold			

=== District 5 ===
==== Republican primary ====
Republican primary results
Party	Candidate	Votes	%
Republican	Dick Anderson (incumbent)	10,297	98.7
Write-in		133	1.3
Total votes		10,430	100.00

==== Democratic primary ====
Democratic primary results
Party	Candidate	Votes	%
Democratic	Jo Beaudreau	12,848	98.9
Write-in		142	1.1
Total votes		12,990	100.00

==== General election ====
Oregon's 5th Senate district results
Party	Candidate	Votes	%
Republican	Dick Anderson (incumbent)	42,336	53.8
Democratic	Jo Beaudreau	36,281	46.1
Write-in		109	0.1
Total votes		78,726	100.00
Republican hold			

=== District 9 ===
==== Republican primary ====
Republican primary results
Party	Candidate	Votes	%
Republican	Fred Girod (incumbent)	12,468	99.3
Write-in		84	0.7
Total votes		12,552	100.00

==== General election ====
Oregon's 9th Senate district results
Party	Candidate	Votes	%
Republican	Fred Girod (incumbent)	49,458	68.9
Democratic	Mike Ashland	22,237	31.0
Write-in		111	0.2
Total votes		71,806	100.00
Republican hold			

=== District 12 ===
==== Republican primary ====
Republican primary results
Party	Candidate	Votes	%
Republican	Bruce Starr	12,334	99.1
Write-in		106	0.9
Total votes		12,440	100.00

==== Democratic primary ====
Democratic primary results
Party	Candidate	Votes	%
Democratic	Scott Hooper	8,366	97.9
Write-in		180	2.1
Total votes		8,546	100.00

==== General election ====
Oregon's 12th Senate district results
Party	Candidate	Votes	%
Republican	Bruce Starr	41,459	55.6
Democratic	Scott Hooper	25,077	33.6
Independent	Andrea Kennedy-Smith	7,984	10.7
Write-in		50	0.1
Total votes		74,570	100.00
Republican hold			

=== District 14 ===
==== Republican primary ====
Republican primary results
Party	Candidate	Votes	%
Republican	Shane Bolton	3,000	97.6
Write-in		74	2.4
Total votes		3,074	100.00

==== Democratic primary ====
Democratic primary results
Party	Candidate	Votes	%
Democratic	Kate Lieber (Incumbent)	17,055	99.6
Write-in		71	0.4
Total votes		17,126	100.00

==== Endorsements ====
Kate Lieber
- Portland Mercury

==== General election ====
Oregon's 14th Senate district results
Party	Candidate	Votes	%
Democratic	Kate Lieber (incumbent)	60,002	85.0
Libertarian	Katy Brumbelow	10,149	14.4
Write-in		456	0.6
Total votes		70,607	100.00
Democratic hold			

=== District 18 ===
==== Republican primary ====
Republican primary results
Party	Candidate	Votes	%
Republican	Brian Pierson	4,338	98.7
Write-in		58	1.3
Total votes		4,396	100.00

==== Democratic primary ====
Democratic primary results
Party	Candidate	Votes	%
Democratic	Wlnsvey Campos (incumbent)	8,595	98.9
Write-in		94	1.1
Total votes		8,689	100.00

==== General election ====
Oregon's 18th Senate district results
Party	Candidate	Votes	%
Democratic	Wlnsvey Campos (incumbent)	38,956	62.7
Republican	Brian Pierson	23,114	37.2
Write-in		65	0.1
Total votes		62,135	100.00
Democratic hold			

=== District 21 ===
==== Democratic primary ====
Democratic primary results
Party	Candidate	Votes	%
Democratic	Kathleen Taylor (incumbent)	20,867	99.2
Write-in		174	0.8
Total votes		21,041	100.00

==== General election ====
Oregon's 21st Senate district results
Party	Candidate	Votes	%
Democratic	Kathleen Taylor (incumbent)	58,422	98.0
Write-in		1,174	2.0
Total votes		59,596	100.00
Democratic hold			

=== District 22 ===
==== Republican primary ====
Republican primary results
Party	Candidate	Votes	%
Republican	Michael Saperstein	1,036	95.4
Write-in		50	4.6
Total votes		1,086	100.00

==== Democratic primary ====
Democratic primary results
Party	Candidate	Votes	%
Democratic	Lew Frederick (incumbent)	20,503	99.2
Write-in		171	0.8
Total votes		20,674	100.00

==== Endorsements ====
Lew Frederick
- Portland Mercury

==== General election ====
Oregon's 22nd Senate district results
Party	Candidate	Votes	%
Democratic	Lew Frederick (incumbent)	66,859	90.5
Republican	Michael Saperstein	6,838	9.3
Write-in		149	0.2
Total votes		73,846	100.00
Democratic hold			

=== District 23 ===
==== Democratic primary ====
Democratic primary results
Party	Candidate	Votes	%
Democratic	Khanh Pham	18,230	98.9
Write-in		210	1.1
Total votes		18,440	100.00

==== General election ====
Oregon's 23rd Senate district results
Party	Candidate	Votes	%
Democratic	Khanh Pham	54,001	97.5
Write-in		1,372	2.5
Total votes		55,373	100.00
Democratic hold			

=== District 25 ===
==== Republican primary ====
Republican primary results
Party	Candidate	Votes	%
Republican	Raymond Love	4,977	98.5
Write-in		77	1.5
Total votes		5,054	100.00

==== Democratic primary ====
Democratic primary results
Party	Candidate	Votes	%
Democratic	Chris Gorsek (incumbent)	7,517	
Write-in		117	1.5
Total votes		7,634	100.00

==== Endorsements ====
Chris Gorsek
- Portland Mercury

==== General election ====
Oregon's 25th Senate district results
Party	Candidate	Votes	%
Democratic	Chris Gorsek (incumbent)	29,253	55.9
Republican	Raymond Love	22,936	43.8
Write-in		130	0.2
Total votes		52,319	100.00
Democratic hold			

=== District 27 ===
==== Republican primary ====
Republican primary results
Party	Candidate	Votes	%
Republican	Matthew Summers	9,657	98.9
Write-in		105	1.1
Total votes		9,762	100.00

==== Democratic primary ====
Democratic primary results
Party	Candidate	Votes	%
Democratic	Anthony Broadman	15,512	99.4
Write-in		91	0.6
Total votes		15,603	100.00

==== General election ====
Oregon's 27th Senate district results
Party	Candidate	Votes	%
Democratic	Anthony Broadman	50,402	59.3
Republican	Matthew Summers	34,617	40.7
Write-in		47	0.1
Total votes		85,066	100.00
Democratic gain from Republican			

=== District 28 ===
==== Republican primary ====
Republican primary results
Party	Candidate	Votes	%
Republican	Diane Linthicum	11,968	59.1
Republican	David A Henslee	8,252	40.7
Write-in		33	0.2
Total votes		20,253	100.00

==== General election ====
Oregon's 28th Senate district results
Party	Candidate	Votes	%
Republican	Diane Linthicum	50,907	69.3
Democratic	Dylan Gutridge	22,430	30.5
Write-in		100	0.1
Total votes		73,437	100.00
Republican hold			

=== District 29 ===
==== Republican primary ====
Republican primary results
Party	Candidate	Votes	%
Republican	Todd Nash	8,916	52.9
Republican	Jim Doherty	4,215	25
Republican	David Drotzmann	3,400	20.2
Republican	Andy Huwe	291	1.7
Write-in		17	0.1
Total votes		16,839	100.00

==== General election ====
Oregon's 29th Senate district results
Party	Candidate	Votes	%
Republican	Todd Nash	45,473	81.5
Independent	Tania Wildbill	10,099	18.1
Write-in		253	0.5
Total votes		55,825	100.00
Republican hold			

=== District 30 ===
==== Republican primary ====
Republican primary results
Party	Candidate	Votes	%
Republican	Mike McLane	13,332	67.3
Republican	Douglas Muck Jr	4,808	24.3
Republican	Robert Neuman	1,598	8.1
Write-in		62	0.3
Total votes		19,800	100.00

==== General election ====
Oregon's 30th Senate district results
Party	Candidate	Votes	%
Republican	Mike McLane	56,886	98.4
Write-in		946	1.6
Total votes		57,832	100.00
Republican hold			
