= Bruce Starr =

American politician

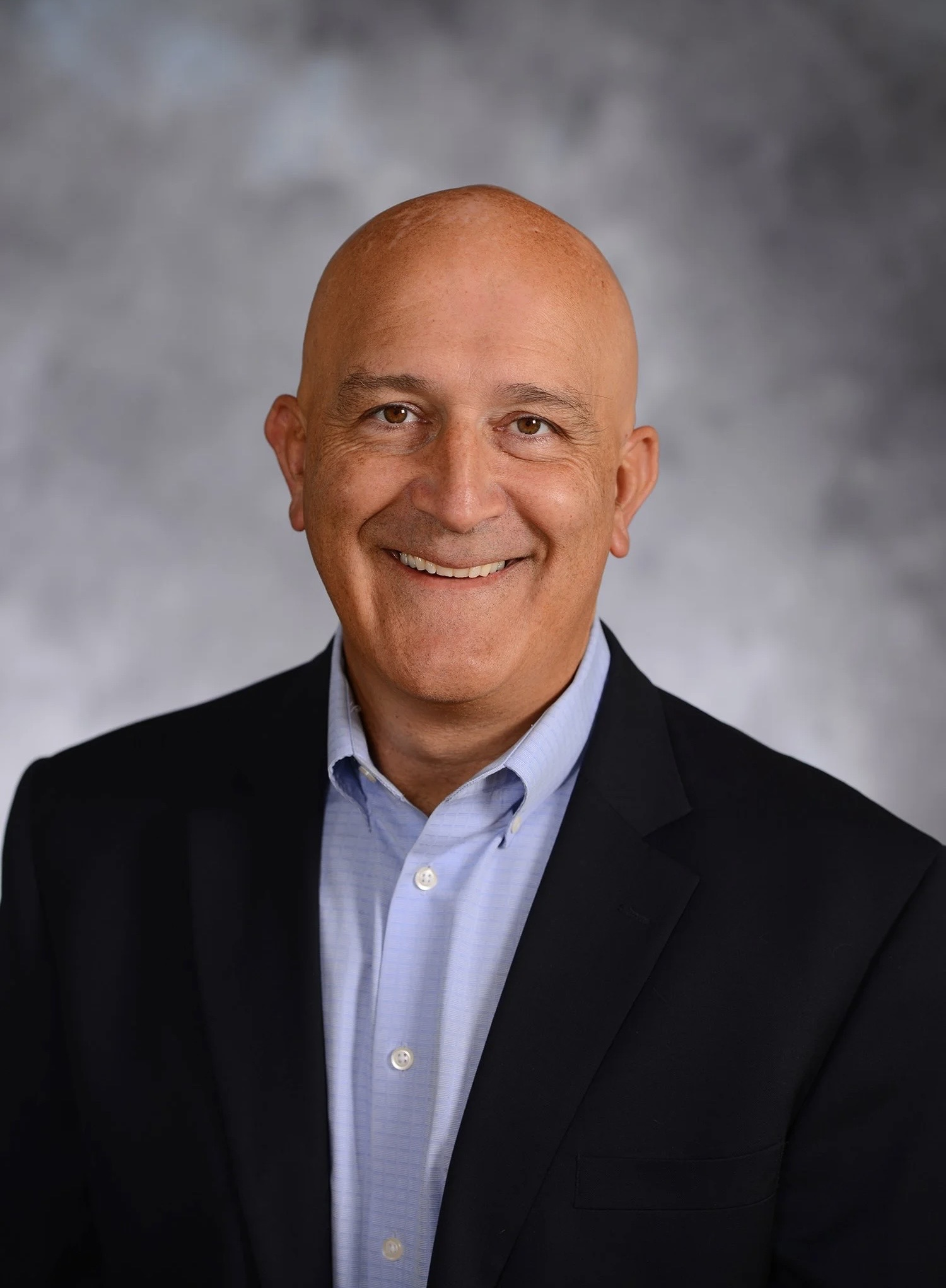

Minority Leader of the Oregon State Senate
- Incumbent
- Assumed office September 15, 2025
- Preceded by: Daniel Bonham

Member of the Oregon State Senate from the 12th district
- Incumbent
- Assumed office January 13, 2025
- Preceded by: Brian Boquist

Member of the Oregon State Senate from the 15th district
- In office January 2003 – January 2015
- Preceded by: Roger Beyer
- Succeeded by: Chuck Riley

Member of the Oregon House of Representatives from the 3rd district
- In office January 1999 – January 2003
- Preceded by: Charles Starr
- Succeeded by: Gordon Anderson

Personal details
- Born: January 12, 1969 (age 57) Portland, Oregon, U.S.
- Party: Republican
- Spouse: Rebecca Starr
- Education: Portland State University (BS)

Bruce Starr (born January 12, 1969) is an American politician in Oregon. He currently serves in the Oregon Senate representing District 12 since 2025 and in September of that year he was elected Senate Minority Leader. A member of the Republican Party, he served two terms in the Oregon House of Representatives before winning election to the Oregon State Senate in 2002 until 2014. There he joined his father, Senator Charles Starr, and they became the first father and son to serve at the same time in Oregon's Senate.

Starr lost re-election but was elected again to his current district ten years later, replacing Brian Boquist, who was rendered ineligible to run for re-election due to his participation in the 2023 Oregon Senate walkout and the passage of Measure 113, which denied eligibility to run for re-election to any state legislator with 10 or more unexcused absences in a legislative session.

Bruce had previously been a member of the Hillsboro City Council, and was re-elected to the Senate in 2006 and 2010, but lost a bid in 2012 to be the Oregon Labor Commissioner.

== Early life and education ==
Starr was born in 1969 in Portland, Oregon to Charles and Kathy Starr. Starr grew up to the south of Hillsboro where he attended Groner Elementary before graduating from Hillsboro High School in 1986. That year he completed high school in independent study in order to work for the campaign of Joe Lutz who was running against Bob Packwood. Lutz lost in the Republican primary for Packwood's United States Senate seat.

After high school he attended Portland State University (PSU) and worked as a legislative intern for Oregon Senator Bob Kintigh during the 1987 and 1989 legislatures. In 1988, he was a delegate to the Republican National Convention held in New Orleans, Louisiana.

Starr graduated from PSU with a Bachelor of Science degree in political science in 1991. After college he worked as a contractor for his own roofing and residential construction company.

He married Rebecca, and they have one daughter and one son.

He worked as a manager for the Portland Business Alliance for international trade and business development before becoming a business owner once again with Cutting Edge Communications.

== Political career ==
In 1992, Starr was selected to serve on the Republican Party's Washington County Central Committee for a two-year term. He served as a committee person at his local Republican precinct and as a legislative aide to his father before election to the Hillsboro City Council in 1994. Starr ran against Donald W. Surhbier for a four-year term representing Ward 1. He was appointed to budget committees of both the county and Hillsboro during this time. He served until his election to the Oregon House of Representatives.

=== Oregon House of Representatives ===
Starr ran for the Oregon House of Representatives in 1998 to replace his father, who was running for the state senate. The district had more registered Republican voters than Democrats. Bruce also served as his father's legislative aide during the elder's terms in the Oregon House.

He won re-election to the House in 2000, winning 57% of the vote and defeating Libertarian David Hintz who received 3% and Democrat Cathy Lamb-Mullin with 40%. Starr was unopposed in the May primary. During the 2001 legislature Starr served as chair of the House's committee on transportation. He also proposed naming the state's new building on the Capitol Mall be named after former U.S. President Ronald Reagan.

=== Oregon State Senate (15th district) ===
In 2002, Starr ran for the Oregon State Senate to represent District 15, which had been redrawn after the 2000 Census. The new version of the district was entirely within Washington County and included Forest Grove, Cornelius, and Hillsboro. Part of the reason for moving to the state senate was that term limits at the time limited people to 12 years maximum and three terms in the House, and Starr hoped to serve for the maximum amount of time. He was elected in the November election to a four-year term, and became part of the first father-son tandem in the history of the Oregon Senate. Bruce received 60% of the vote compared to Democrat Ermine Todd who received 34% and Constitutional Party candidate Tom Humphrey who garnered 3%. This was also the first time since 1977 that a child served alongside their parent in either chamber.

Working in the legislature he helped create and pass the Oregon Transportation Investment Act and sponsored Oregon's version of Jessica's Law. Starr won re-election to the Senate in November 2006, defeating Democrat John Napolitano with 54% to 46% of the vote after running unopposed in the May primary. He represents District 15 which is composed mainly of Washington County and includes part of Clackamas County.

In 2007, the Oregon Government Ethics Commission fined Starr $300 for failing to report on his annual disclosure forms a 2002 legislative conference in Hawaii (paid for by Oregon Beer & Wine Distributors Association), and an education trip to Israel (paid for by another organization).

Starr sponsored a bill that required the Oregon Department of Motor Vehicles to issue driver's licenses only to legal residents in May 2007. The bill passed the Senate, but was not enacted into law. A similar measure was passed in February 2008 and signed into law the Oregon Governor Ted Kulongoski.

In November 2007, Starr opted not to run for the open Oregon Secretary of State position in 2008; he was the most mentioned Republican option to run against several Democratic candidates. He had considered running for the office in 2004. Starr did enter the race to serve as Commissioner of the Oregon Bureau of Labor and Industries in December 2011 for the May 2012 primary. He was unopposed, but lost in the general election in November 2012 to incumbent Brad Avakian 47% to 53%.

From 2013 to 2014, he served as president of the National Conference of State Legislatures.

Starr faced a rematch against 2010 opponent Chuck Riley in the closest Oregon legislative race of 2014, which Riley narrowly won. The race was not called for nearly a week after Election Day.

=== Dundee City Council ===
In November 2022, Starr was elected to one of three at-large seats on the Dundee City Council, placing second among five candidates. He served in this role until his election to another term in the Oregon State Senate in 2024.

=== Oregon State Senate (12th district) ===
Due to the passage of Measure 113, which denied eligibility to run for re-election to any state legislator with 10 or more unexcused absences in a legislative session, Senator Brian Boquist was unable to run for re-election. Starr announced his candidacy for the seat in November 2023. He ran unopposed in the Republican primary and defeated Democratic farmer Scott Hooper and Green/Working Families paralegal Andrea Kennedy-Smith in the November general election with 56.2% of the vote.

On September 15, 2025, Starr was selected as the new Senate Minority Leader following the resignation of incumbent Daniel Bonham.

In September 2025, the Legislature passed a $4.3 billion transportation funding package in a special session that raised the state gas tax by $0.06 per gallon, increased vehicle title and registration fees, and imposed a temporary payroll tax for public transit. Starr opposed the package, offering unsuccessful floor amendments, then moving to refer the bill to voters. Starr, Representative Ed Diehl, and Jason Williams of the Taxpayer Association of Oregon were chief petitioners of a referendum campaign called No Tax Oregon, which submitted nearly 200,000 signatures to place the package before voters. The Legislature later passed a bill moving the vote from the November 2026 general election to the May primary, which Starr and other Republicans criticized. In the May 2026 election, voters rejected the measure with more than 83% opposed.

With the package's revenues suspended pending the vote, lawmakers adopted a temporary fix for the Oregon Department of Transportation's budget shortfall during the 2026 session by reallocating existing agency funds. Starr said the budget had been balanced without raising taxes.

As of November 2026, Starr is the vice chair of the Senate Committee on Rules and Executive Appointments and co-vice chair of the Joint Committee on Transportation. He also serves on the Senate Committee on Transportation and the joint committees on the Interstate 5 Bridge, Legislative Administration, Legislative Audits, Legislative Counsel, and Legislative Policy and Research.

== Electoral history ==
2024 Oregon State Senator, 12th district
Party	Candidate	Votes	%
Republican	Bruce W Starr	41,459	55.6
Democratic	Scott Hooper	25,077	33.6
Independent	Andrea Kennedy-Smith	7,984	10.7
Write-in		50	0.1
Total votes		74,570	100%

2014 Oregon State Senator, 15th district
Party	Candidate	Votes	%
Democratic	Chuck Riley	18,156	45.7
Republican	Bruce Starr	17,869	45.0
Libertarian	Caitlin Mitchel-Markley	3,593	9.0
Write-in		116	0.3
Total votes		39,734	100%

2012 Oregon Commissioner of Labor election
Party	Candidate	Votes	%
Nonpartisan	Brad Avakian	681,987	52.5
Nonpartisan	Bruce Starr	606,735	46.7
Write-in		9,616	0.7
Total votes		1,298,338	100%

2010 Oregon State Senator, 15th district
Party	Candidate	Votes	%
Republican	Bruce Starr	21,382	52.1
Democratic	Chuck Riley	19,533	47.6
Write-in		120	0.3
Total votes		41,035	100%

2006 Oregon State Senator, 15th district
Party	Candidate	Votes	%
Republican	Bruce Starr	19,973	54.9
Democratic	John Napolitano	16,308	44.9
Write-in		71	0.2
Total votes		36,352	100%

== See also ==
- Larry George

Oregon Senate
Preceded by Daniel Bonham	Minority Leader of the Oregon Senate; 2025–present	Incumbent
