= Anthony Broadman =

Member of the Oregon State Senate

Member of the Oregon State Senate from the 27th district
- Incumbent
- Assumed office January 13, 2025
- Preceded by: Tim Knopp

Member of the Bend City Council, Position 2
- In office January 2021 – January 2025
- Preceded by: Bill Moseley
- Succeeded by: Gina Franzosa

Personal details
- Born: Anthony Stephen Broadman
- Party: Democratic

Anthony Stephen Broadman is an American politician currently serving in the Oregon State Senate. A member of the Democratic Party, he represents the 27th district, which consists of parts of Deschutes County centered around the greater Bend area. Broadman is the first Democrat elected to the 27th Senate district since 1980. In November 2026, his Senate Democratic colleagues selected him as caucus leader ahead of the 2027 legislative session, succeeding Kayse Jama.

== Early life and education ==
Broadman attended Princeton University, earning a Bachelor of Arts in English. He earned his Juris Doctor from the University of Arizona.

== Career ==
Broadman is a partner at Galanda Broadman, a law firm specializing in indigenous rights. He has served on the board of Economic Development for Central Oregon (EDCO) and was president of the board for Horner Cycling Foundation.

He served as chair of the Indian Law Section of the Oregon State Bar and chair of the Administrative Law Section of the Washington State Bar Association.

He served as chief judge of the Confederated Tribes of Warm Springs Court of Appeals and is a member of the Central Oregon Intergovernmental Council, serving for a short time as chairman.

=== Bend City Council ===
Broadman was elected to the Bend City Council in 2020, defeating August Paul Johnson in the November election and served from January 2021 to January 2025. During his term, he served as mayor pro tem. In that role, he spoke publicly for the council after a fatal shooting at a Bend grocery store in August 2022.

As a Bend city councilor, Broadman voted with the majority in November 2022 to adopt a city camping code regulating where people could camp on public property. Opponents on the council called the requirement that campers move every 24 hours "cruel," while Broadman said the city lacked clear rules on where camping was allowed.

He also supported the council's May 2022 zoning changes allowing more homeless shelters.

=== Oregon State Senate ===
Three-term Republican Senator Tim Knopp was deemed ineligible to run for re-election due to his participation in the 2023 Oregon Senate walkout and the passage of Measure 113, which denied eligibility to run for re-election to any state legislator with 10 or more unexcused absences in a legislative session. Broadman criticized the walkout as a failure to show up for Central Oregon.

Broadman announced his candidacy for Senate District 27, which had not elected a Democrat since 1980. Broadman ran unopposed in the primary and defeated Republican small-business owner and Redmond School Board member Michael Summers in the general election.

In 2025, upon taking office, Broadman was appointed to the Judiciary Committee, Housing and Development Committee, and Joint Ways and Means Committee. He was made co-chair of the Joint Committee on Ways and Means Subcommittee On Public Safety.

In October 2025, Senate President Rob Wagner appointed Broadman chair of the Senate Committee on Finance and Revenue, replacing Mark Meek.

On November 14, 2026, Senate Democrats chose Broadman as their new caucus leader. He succeeded Jama, who stepped aside from the post and remained in the Senate. Broadman said his priorities for the 2027 session would be the economy, affordability, and safer schools and communities.

== Legislative record ==
=== Public lands ===
In 2026, Broadman was the chief sponsor of Senate Bill 1590, which bars state and local governments from cooperating with federal efforts to sell or transfer federal public lands in Oregon.

=== Taxes and budget ===
In 2026, Broadman chaired the Senate Finance and Revenue Committee and was a lead author of Senate Bill 1507, which disconnected Oregon's tax code from three federal tax breaks enacted in the One Big Beautiful Bill Act: a deduction for new car-loan interest, an exemption for gains on certain private-company stock, and immediate deductions for large equipment purchases. State analysts projected the bill would add about $311.6 million in revenue in the current budget period, and it expanded the state Earned Income Tax Credit and created a credit for businesses that added jobs. Broadman argued that Oregon would not lose competitiveness because other states were also rejecting the breaks.

=== Transportation ===
During the 2025 special session, Broadman spoke in support of Governor Tina Kotek's transportation funding bill that raised gas taxes and vehicle fees, citing Central Oregon's reliance on roads and mountain passes.

=== Tribal sovereignty ===
In 2025, Broadman was the chief sponsor of Senate Bill 1011, which created a formal process for federally recognized tribes in Oregon to ask the governor to pursue retrocession of state jurisdiction under Public Law 280, a 1953 law that required Oregon to assume criminal and civil jurisdiction over most tribal lands without tribal consent. Broadman described the 1953 law in committee as a stain on the country's and Oregon's history.

=== Wildfire ===
In 2025, Broadman co-carried House Bill 3940 on the Senate floor. The law created a tax on oral nicotine products, raised the timber tax, and directed funds to wildfire prevention. It did not create dedicated funding for fighting large fires.

Broadman also joined Republican lawmakers in calling for repeal of the state's revised wildfire hazard map, saying it did not create an equitable system for homeowners.

== Personal life ==
Broadman is married and has three children. He has served on the board of Grace First Lutheran Church.

== Electoral history ==
2024 Oregon State Senator, 27th district
| Party | Candidate | Votes | % |
|---|---|---|---|
| Democratic | Anthony Broadman | 50,402 | 59.3 |
| Republican | Michael Summers | 34,617 | 40.7 |
| Write-in | | 47 | 0.1 |
| Total votes | | 85,066 | 100% |

Bend City Council election, 2020 (Position 2)
| Party | Candidate | Votes | % |
|---|---|---|---|
| Nonpartisan | Anthony Broadman | 38,701 | 78.73% |
| Nonpartisan | August Paul Johnson | 10,048 | 20.44% |
| Write-in | | 405 | 0.82% |
| Total votes | | 49,154 | 100.00% |
