= Noah Robinson =

American politician

Member of the Oregon State Senate from the 2nd district
- Incumbent
- Assumed office January 13, 2025
- Preceded by: Art Robinson

Personal details
- Born: Noah Edward Robinson
- Party: Republican
- Scientific career
- Fields: Chemistry
- Workplaces: California Institute of Technology
- Thesis: Investigations of Peptide and Protein Deamidation (2004)
- Doctoral advisor: Harry B. Gray

Noah Edward Robinson is an American politician currently serving in the Oregon State Senate. A member of the Republican Party, he represents the 2nd district, which comprises all of Josephine County as well as southern Douglas County and northern Jackson County.

He is the son of the previous senator to represent this district, Art Robinson. The elder Robinson was deemed ineligible to run for re-election due to his participation in the 2023 Oregon Senate walkout and the passage of Measure 113, which denied eligibility to run for re-election to any state legislator with 10 or more unexcused absences in a legislative session.

== Education ==
Robinson was homeschooled. He helped develop the Robinson Curriculum, a homeschool curriculum that he says has been used by about 100,000 students. He earned a bachelor's degree in chemistry from Southern Oregon University and a PhD in chemistry from California Institute of Technology, where his doctoral advisor was Harry B. Gray. His thesis was titled Investigations of Peptide and Protein Deamidation (2004).

== Career ==
Robinson worked at Rockefeller University to study deamidation in peptides. In 2007, Robinson co-authored a review article on atmospheric carbon dioxide with his father and Willie Soon, published in the Journal of American Physicians and Surgeons. The article argues that increased atmospheric carbon dioxide has beneficial effects on plant and animal life and is not driving climate change.

Before running for office, Robinson worked as an unpaid legislative staffer for his father throughout Art Robinson's Senate Term.

=== Oregon State Senate ===
Robinson's father, Art Robinson, participated in the 2023 Oregon Senate walkout and accrued 10 or more unexcused absences, disqualifying him from seeking reelection under Measure 113. Robinson decided to run for his father's seat and faced Representative Christine Goodwin in the Republican primary. Robinson won the primary, then went on to defeat Democrat Tracy Thompson in the general election, with 66.9% of the vote.

In the 2025 session, Robinson was appointed to the Energy and Environment Committee, Education Committee, and the Joint Committee on Information Management and Technology.

=== Political positions ===
During his 2024 campaign, Robinson described himself as a conservative who supports gun rights, parental choice in schools, lower taxes, natural resource industries such as timber, and law enforcement, and who opposes abortion.

On education, he said he favors local control, including allowing school districts rather than the state to set curriculum requirements, and called for eliminating the Oregon and U.S. departments of education.

== Electoral history ==
2024 Oregon State Senator, 2nd district
Party	Candidate	Votes	%
Republican	Noah Robinson	50,872	66.9
Democratic	Tracy Thompson	25,040	32.9
Write-in		123	0.2
Total votes		76,035	100%

2024 Oregon State Senator, 2nd district Republican primary
Party	Candidate	Votes	%
Republican	Noah Robinson	13,228	61.1
Republican	Christine Goodwin	8,367	38.7
Write-in		51	0.2
Total votes		21,646	100
