= 2020 Oregon State Senate election =

- November 3, 2020

16 of 30 seats in the Oregon State Senate 16 seats needed for a majority
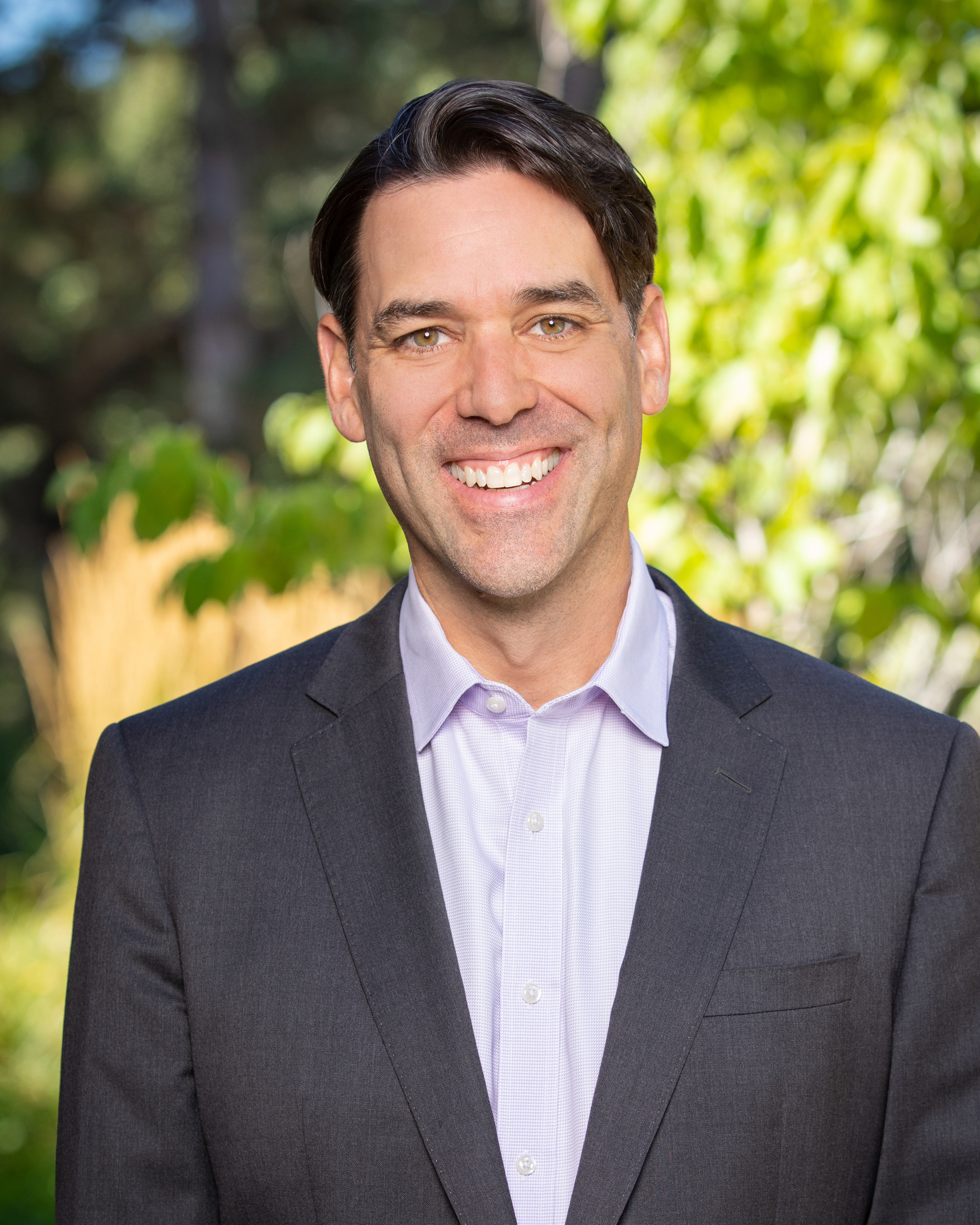

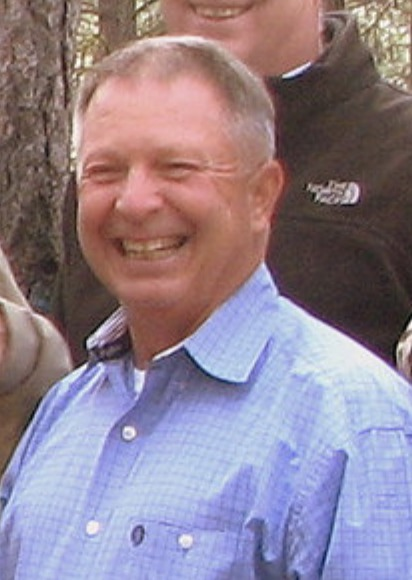
	Majority party	Minority party
Leader	Rob Wagner	Herman Baertschiger Jr.
Party	Democratic	Republican
Leader since	May 22, 2020	January 22, 2019
Leader's seat	District 19 (Lake Oswego)	District 2 (Grants Pass)
Last election	18 seats, 62.1%	12 seats, 37.9%
Seats before	18	12
Seats won	18	12
Seat change	Steady	Steady
Popular vote	628,347	516,030
Percentage	54.0%	44.4%
Swing	▼8.1%	▲6.5%
- Results of the elections: Democratic gain Republican gain Democratic hold Republican hold No election
President of the Senate before election
Peter Courtney
Democratic
Elected President of the Senate
Peter Courtney
Democratic

The 2020 Oregon State Senate election was held on Tuesday, November 3, 2020, with the primary election being held on May 19, 2020. Voters in 16 of the 30 Oregon State Senate districts elected their state senators. The elections coincided with the elections for other offices, including for U.S. President.

The Democratic Party kept their majority. The Oregon State Senate does not have term limits.

== Background ==
Democrats had held the Oregon Senate since 2002 and the chamber was not considered competitive in 2020.

== Electoral system ==
Members of the Oregon State Senate are elected from single-member districts by first-past-the-post voting to four-year terms with staggered elections. Contested nominations of the Democratic and Republican parties for each district were determined by an open primary election. Minor-party and independent candidates were nominated by petition, and write-in candidates had to file a request with the Secretary of State's office for votes for them to be counted.

== Predictions ==
Source	Ranking	As of
The Cook Political Report	Likely D	October 21, 2020

== Results summary ==
Results
Affiliation	Candidates	Votes	Vote %	Seats before	Seats up	Seats won	Seats after
Democratic	16	628,347	54.01%	18	7	7	18
Republican	12	516,030	44.36%	12	9	9	12
Libertarian	3	6,694	0.58%	0	0	0	0
Pacific Green	1	3,107	0.27%	0	0	0	0
Total valid votes	32	1,154,178	99.21%	30	16	16	30

== Close races ==
Districts where the margin of victory was under 10%:

1. District 10 (special), 0.74% (gain)
2. District 27, 1.63%
3. District 5, 2.85% (gain)
4. District 25, 3.99%

== Results by district ==
=== 1st District ===
General election results
Party	Candidate	Votes	%
Republican	Dallas Heard	51,417	68.64%
Democratic	Kat Stone	23,369	31.20%
Write-in		124	0.17%
Total votes		74,910	100.00%

=== 2nd District ===
General election results
Party	Candidate	Votes	%
Republican	Art Robinson	48,627	63.90%
Democratic	Jerry Allen	25,559	33.59%
Libertarian	Thomas Griffin	1,792	2.35%
Write-in		124	0.16%
Total votes		76,102	100.00%

=== 5th District ===
General election results
Party	Candidate	Votes	%
Republican	Dick Anderson	37,807	49.32%
Democratic	Melissa Cribbins	35,620	46.47%
Green	Shauleen Higgins	3,107	4.05%
Write-in		118	0.15%
Total votes		76,652	100.00%
Republican gain from Democratic			

=== 9th District ===
General election results
Party	Candidate	Votes	%
Republican	Fred Girod	50,357	66.96%
Democratic	Jim Hinsvark	22,627	30.09%
Libertarian	Patrick Marnell	2,127	2.83%
Write-in		93	0.12%
Total votes		75,204	100.00%

=== 10th District (special) ===
General election results
Party	Candidate	Votes	%
Democratic	Deb Patterson	37,725	48.49%
Republican	Denyc Boles	37,149	47.75%
Libertarian	Taylor A Rickey	2,775	3.57%
Write-in		145	0.19%
Total votes		77,794	100.00%
Democratic gain from Republican			

=== 12th District ===
General election results
Party	Candidate	Votes	%
Republican	Brian Boquist	45,391	58.27%
Democratic	Bernadette Hansen	32,389	41.58%
Write-in		115	0.15
Total votes		77,895	100.00%

=== 14th District ===
General election results
Party	Candidate	Votes	%
Democratic	Kate Lieber	48,900	68.99%
Republican	Harmony Mulkey	21,838	30.81%
Write-in		141	0.20%
Total votes		70,879	100.00%

=== 18th District ===
General election results
Party	Candidate	Votes	%
Democratic	Ginny Burdick	63,082	95.78%
Write-in		2,776	4.22%
Total votes		65,858	100.00%

=== 21st District ===
General election results
Party	Candidate	Votes	%
Democratic	Kathleen Taylor	71,543	97.59%
Write-in		1,769	2.41%
Total votes		73,312	100.00%

=== 22nd District ===
General election results
Party	Candidate	Votes	%
Democratic	Lew Frederick	70,489	98.05%
Write-in		1,401	1.95%
Total votes		71,890	100.00%

=== 23rd District ===
General election results
Party	Candidate	Votes	%
Democratic	Michael Dembrow	61,638	97.03%
Write-in		1,885	2.97%
Total votes		63,523	100.00%

=== 25th District ===
General election results
Party	Candidate	Votes	%
Democratic	Chris Gorsek	30,206	51.93%
Republican	Justin Hwang	27,882	47.94%
Write-in		76	0.13%
Total votes		58,164	100.00%

=== 27th District ===
General election results
Party	Candidate	Votes	%
Republican	Tim Knopp	49,207	50.73%
Democratic	Eileen Kiely	47,621	49.10%
Write-in		161	0.17%
Total votes		96,989	100.00%

=== 28th District ===
General election results
Party	Candidate	Votes	%
Republican	Dennis Linthicum	54,800	72.73%
Democratic	Hugh Palcic	20,444	27.13%
Write-in		102	0.14%
Total votes		75,346	100.00%

=== 29th District ===
General election results
Party	Candidate	Votes	%
Republican	Bill Hansell	45,084	75.91%
Democratic	Mildred O'Callaghan	14,214	23.93%
Write-in		94	0.16%
Total votes		59,392	100.00%

=== 30th District ===
General election results
Party	Candidate	Votes	%
Republican	Lynn Findley	46,471	66.87%
Democratic	Carina Miller	22,921	32.98%
Write-in		105	0.15%
Total votes		69,497	100.00%

== See also ==
- 2020 Oregon House of Representatives election
