= Tim Knopp =

American politician (born 1965)

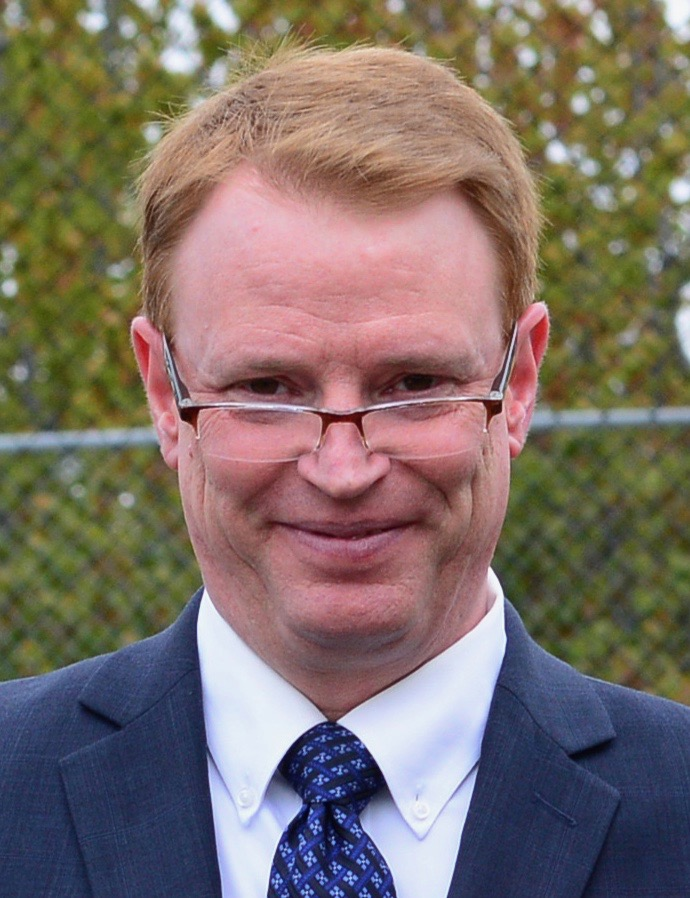

Minority Leader of the Oregon State Senate
- In office October 22, 2021 – April 15, 2024
- Preceded by: Fred Girod
- Succeeded by: Daniel Bonham

Member of the Oregon State Senate from the 27th district
- In office January 14, 2013 – January 13, 2025
- Preceded by: Chris Telfer
- Succeeded by: Anthony Broadman

Majority Leader of the Oregon House of Representatives
- In office January 2003 – January 2005
- Preceded by: Karen Minnis
- Succeeded by: Wayne Scott

Member of the Oregon House of Representatives from the 54th district
- In office January 1999 – January 2005
- Preceded by: Dennis R. Luke
- Succeeded by: Chuck Burley

Personal details
- Born: September 30, 1965 (age 60) Portland, Oregon, U.S.
- Party: Republican
- Spouse: Melissa Knopp
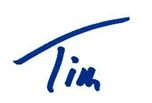
- Signature

Tim Knopp (born September 30, 1965) is an American politician and businessman who served in both houses of the Oregon Legislative Assembly, the Oregon House of Representatives from 1999 to 2005, and the Oregon State Senate from 2013 to 2025. A member of the Republican Party, he served as majority leader in the House from 2003 to 2005 and as minority leader in the Senate from 2021 to 2024.

In response to his participation in the 2023 Oregon Senate walkout and the passage of Measure 113, which denied eligibility to run for re-election to any state legislator with 10 or more unexcused absences in a legislative session, Knopp was barred from re-election to another consecutive term.

Since January 2025, Knopp has served as the Oregon co-chair of U.S. Term Limits, an advocacy group seeking to enact term limits in the United States Congress.

== Early life and education ==
Knopp attended York Community High School.

== Career ==
=== Oregon House of Representatives ===
Knopp served three terms in the Oregon House of Representatives. He was first elected in 1998 and left the House in 2005. Knopp was majority leader in 2003. While in the House, Knopp was strongly opposed to abortion and allied to social conservatives. In 1999, Knopp helped enshrine Oregon's unique "kicker" law, which returns excess tax revenue back to taxpayers, into the Constitution by sponsoring referral legislation that brought Measure 86 to the voters in 2000. Measure 86 was approved by a 62% of voters. From 2003 to 2005, he served as majority leader.

=== Oregon State Senate ===
Knopp was first elected to the Oregon Senate in 2012. At the time, Knopp was executive vice president of the Central Oregon Home Builders and a past president of the Deschutes County Republican Central Committee. He defeated incumbent Senator Chris Telfer in the Republican primary, winning 68% of the primary vote to Telfer's 32%. Knopp then defeated Democratic nominee Geri Hauser in the general election. In 2014, Knopp was named deputy caucus leader of the Oregon Senate Republicans.

Knopp won reelection in 2016 with 60.9% of the vote, defeating Democratic nominee Greg Delgado. He was re-elected in 2020 with 50.7% of the vote, defeating retired Daimler executive Eileen Kiely of Sunriver.

On October 22, 2021, Knopp was elected senate minority leader by the House Republican Caucus after Fred Girod stepped down due to personal medical reasons. On April 4, 2024, Knopp announced that he would be stepping down effective April 15, 2024. He was replaced by Daniel Bonham.

==== Employment and pension legislation ====
Knopp voted for the Oregon Equal Pay Act, which unanimously passed the Senate in 2017. In 2019, Knopp, along with Democratic senator Sara Gelser, introduced two bills on workplace sexual harassment, The pieces of legislation, both signed into law by Governor Kate Brown, prohibited Oregon employers from requiring, as a condition of employment, nondisclosure agreements blocking employees from discussing allegations of employment discrimination or sexual assault, and requiring public employers to have written anti-harassment policies and procedures.

Knopp introduced many bills to overhaul Oregon's pension system for public employees (Oregon PERS), by moving it from a defined benefit program to a 401(k)-style defined contribution plan.

==== Climate change and 2019 walkout ====
Knopp rejects the scientific consensus on climate change. Knopp opposed legislation to increase the production of renewable energy and limit greenhouse gas emissions.

Knopp opposed the 2019 cap and trade bill. In 2019, Knopp and the other 11 state Senate Republicans walked out of the state Senate session, seeking to block the Democratic majority in the Senate from passing cap and trade legislation to combat climate change by lowering greenhouse gas emissions. Most of the Republicans fled to Idaho, and the absence deprived the chamber of a quorum. Republicans insisted that the bill would increase fuel prices and hurt the economy. In an interview with The Oregonian Knopp said, "I feel no constitutional obligation to stand around so they can pass their leftist progressive agenda ... I think that’s true for every other Senate district that's out there that's represented by Republicans." At the time, there were 29 senators (the Senate has 30 seats, but 1 was vacant due to a death). Without the Republican senators, the remaining 18 Democratic state senators could not reach a quorum of 20 to hold a vote. Knopp said that he had left Oregon "in a cabin near a lake .... And that's about all I can tell you." Knopp was the only Republican senator who did not take part in the 2020 walk-out by both the Senate and the House over a cap-and-trade bill. The Republican caucus chose Knopp as minority leader for the 2021 session.

==== Anti-vaccination activities ====
Knopp was a leading opponent of legislation in 2015 and 2019 to eliminate non-medical exemptions to the requirement that Oregon schoolchildren be vaccinated. Speaking at an anti-mandatory vaccination rally in 2019, Knopp said passage of the legislation would lead to "no freedom in America."

==== January 6 attack on the Capitol ====
In January 2021, after a pro-Trump mob violently stormed the U.S. Capitol in Washington, D.C., the Oregon Republican Party passed a resolution falsely claiming that the attack was a staged "false flag" attack. Knopp issued a statement disavowing the falsehood, as did all 23 state House Republicans.

==== 2023 Walkout and unexcused absences ====
While participating in a Republican-led walkout in May 2023 Knopp reached the 10 unexcused absence threshold set by measure 113, disqualifying him from running for reelection after his current term ends. Knopp and 4 other Senators filed a lawsuit against Secretary of State LaVonne Griffin-Valade in response, arguing that the measure's wording allowed them to serve one additional term before being barred from reelection. On October 24 the Oregon Supreme Court agreed to hear the case with arguments beginning December 14. On February 1, 2024, the Court unanimously ruled against the Republican Senators, confirming Knopp's disqualification after the end of his term in January 2025. Three of the senators filed a suit in federal court, which Knopp declined to take part in, saying "We had our day in court, we obviously lost, and I think all the legislators would do it again, if they had to do it over." Knopp's term ended on January 13, 2025, and he was replaced by Anthony Broadman, the first Democrat to represent the district in over 40 years.

== Political Positions ==
Following the Standoff at Eagle Pass, Knopp signed a letter in support of Texas Governor Greg Abbott's decision in the conflict.

== Personal life ==
Knopp is married to his wife, Melissa and has four children. During the 2017 legislative session, Knopp employed his wife and son Daniel as paid legislative staff.

== Electoral history ==
2020 Oregon State Senator, 27th district
Party	Candidate	Votes	%
Republican	Tim Knopp	49,207	50.7
Democratic	Eileen Kiely	47,621	49.1
Write-in		161	0.2
Total votes		96,989	100%

2016 Oregon State Senator, 27th district
Party	Candidate	Votes	%
Republican	Tim Knopp	44,691	60.6
Democratic	Greg Delgado	28,933	39.2
Write-in		147	0.2
Total votes		73,771	100%

2012 Oregon State Senator, 27th district
Party	Candidate	Votes	%
Republican	Tim Knopp	35,398	58.9
Democratic	Geri Hauser	24,399	40.6
Write-in		270	0.4
Total votes		60,067	100%

Oregon Senate
Preceded by Fred Girod	Minority Leader of the Oregon Senate; 2021–2024	Succeeded by Daniel Bonham
