= Oregon's 9th Senate district =

American legislative district

Oregon's 9th Senate District as of September 27, 2021

District 9 of the Oregon State Senate comprises the rural areas in eastern Marion and Linn counties as well as southern Clackamas County. It is composed of Oregon House districts 17 and 18. It is currently represented by Republican Fred Girod of Stayton.

== Election results ==
District boundaries have changed over time. Therefore, senators before 2021 may not represent the same constituency as today. From 1993 until 2003, the district covered parts of east Portland, and from 2003 until 2023, it covered about the same region as currently with minor changes. The current district is similar to the previous iteration with the inclusion of more of northern Marion County, including St. Paul, along with parts of Canby while losing much of its territory in Linn County, including Lebanon and Sweet Home.

The results are as follows:

Year	Candidate	Party	Percent	Opponent	Party	Percent	Opponent	Party	Percent
1982	Frank L. Roberts	Democratic	56.4%	Paul Howe	Republican	43.6%	No third candidate		
1986	Frank L. Roberts	Democratic	64.2%	Herb Brown	Republican	35.8%	No third candidate		
1990	Frank L. Roberts	Democratic	59.4%	Dan Phegley	Republican	40.6%	No third candidate		
1994	Randy Leonard	Democratic	100.0%	Unopposed					
1998	Frank Shields	Democratic	100.0%	Unopposed					
2004	Roger Beyer	Republican	83.6%	Herman Joseph Baurer	Constitution	16.4%	No third candidate		
2008	Fred Girod	Republican	61.1%	Bob McDonald	Democratic	38.7%	No third candidate		
2012	Fred Girod	Republican	64.2%	Steven H. Frank	Democratic	35.6%	No third candidate		
2016	Fred Girod	Republican	68.7%	Richard Harisay	Democratic	26.9%	Jack Stillwell	Libertarian	4.2%
2020	Fred Girod	Republican	67.0%	Jim Hinsvark	Democratic	30.1%	Patrick Marnell	Libertarian	2.8%
2024	Fred Girod	Republican	68.9%	Mike Ashland	Democratic	31.0%	No third candidate		
