= Fred Girod =

American politician

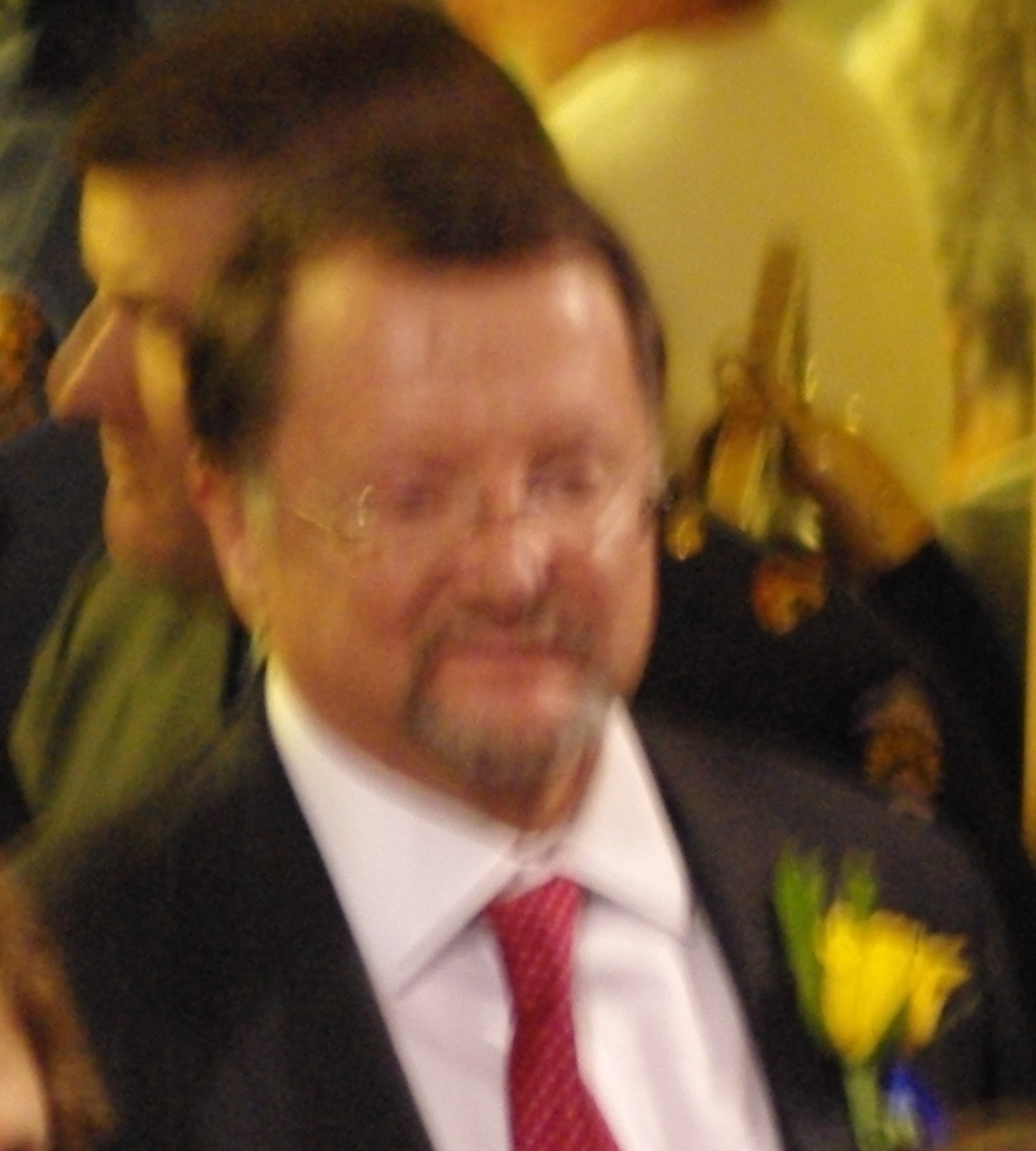

Minority Leader of the Oregon State Senate
- In office January 11, 2021 – October 22, 2021
- Preceded by: Herman Baertschiger Jr.
- Succeeded by: Tim Knopp

Member of the Oregon State Senate from the 9th district
- Incumbent
- Assumed office 2008
- Preceded by: Roger Beyer

Member of the Oregon House of Representatives from the 17th district
- In office 2007–2008
- Preceded by: Jeff Kropf
- Succeeded by: Sherrie Sprenger

Member of the Oregon House of Representatives from the 30th district
- In office 1993–1995
- Preceded by: Jeff Gilmour
- Succeeded by: Larry Wells

Personal details
- Born: 1951 (age 74–75) Salem, Oregon
- Party: Republican
- Education: Oregon State University (BS); Oregon Health and Science University (DMD); Harvard University (MPA)
- Website: https://fredgirod.com

Fred Frank Girod (born 1951) is an American dentist and politician from Oregon. A member of the Republican Party, he has represented the 9th district in the Oregon State Senate since 2008. The district covers the mid-Willamette Valley. Girod served as the Senate minority leader from 2020 to 2021. He previously served in the Oregon House of Representatives from 1993-1995 and 2007-2008.

== Early life and education ==
Girod was born in Salem, Oregon. He graduated from Stayton High School in Stayton, Oregon. He earned a Bachelor of Science degree from Oregon State University in Corvallis, Oregon, a DMD from Oregon Health & Science University School of Dentistry, and a Master of Public Administration from Harvard University.

== Career ==
Girod is a dentist. He served in the Oregon House of Representatives from 1993 to 1995, where he chaired the Rules Committee. In 1994, he sought the Republican nomination for Oregon's 5th congressional district and lost the primary to Jim Bunn. He later served on the Stayton City Council.

Marion and Linn County Republicans selected Girod to run again for the House in 2006, in the 17th district, following Jeff Kropf's departure from the race. He won that election, defeating Democrat Dan Thackaberry. In 2008, he was appointed to the Oregon Senate to succeed Senator Roger Beyer in the 9th district upon his resignation and was sworn in that January. He was elected to the seat in November 2008 and reelected in 2012, 2016, 2020, and 2024.

In April 2020, Senate Republicans elected Girod as their leader after Herman Baertschiger Jr. stepped down. He stepped down in October 2021, citing health reasons, and the caucus elected Tim Knopp to succeed him. Girod has served as co-vice chair of the Joint Committee on Ways and Means, including in the 2025 and 2026 sessions.

Much of Girod's legislative work has concerned recovery from the 2020 Santiam Canyon wildfires. In 2021, he was a chief sponsor of Senate Bill 405, which gave wildfire victims more time and flexibility to rebuild. He was also a chief sponsor of Senate Bill 464, which would have let counties offer property tax relief to wildfire victims. In 2025, he sponsored Senate Bill 1189, which created a limited exception to water quality permitting requirements so construction of a publicly owned sewage treatment plant in the North Santiam Basin could begin.

Girod voted against Senate Bill 762, the 2021 omnibus wildfire bill that created a statewide wildfire risk map and funded wildfire preparedness programs. Girod said he saw the bill as "an assault on those people that lost their homes."

=== Legislative walkouts ===
On June 20, 2019, Girod was one of 11 Senate Republican members who stopped attending floor sessions in opposition to House Bill 2020, a cap-and-trade bill that would limit greenhouse gas emissions.One of the Senate's 30 seats was vacant following the death of Republican Jackie Winters, and without the Republican members, the 18 remaining Democrats could not reach the 20-member quorum needed to vote. Before the bill's committee vote, Girod said Republicans would stay if it were referred to voters. When most Republican senators returned on June 29, the Senate voted to send the bill to the Rules Committee, effectively ending it for the session. Girod was among the senators still absent that day.

In February 2020, Girod was among the Senate Republicans who again left the Capitol to deny a quorum, this time over Senate Bill 1530, a revised cap-and-trade bill.

In March 2021, then-Republican leader Girod and five other Republican senators attended a floor session on Senate Bill 554, a gun-storage bill that also banned firearms in the Capitol. Their attendance gave the Senate a quorum, and the bill passed over Republican objections. Girod said staying away through the end of the session was not feasible. A Molalla resident filed a recall petition against him in April, but no signatures were filed by the July deadline.

During the 2023 walkout, Girod was excused from floor sessions. He was one of three Senate Republicans who did not reach the 10 unexcused absenses that, under Measure 113, bar a legislator from running in the next election.

== Political positions ==
In February 2024, Girod was one of five Oregon Republican state senators who signed a letter in support of Texas Governor Greg Abbott supporting his border-security efforts. He later joined a group of Oregon Republican lawmakers on a trip to the Arizona-Mexico border, which participants said was meant to draw attention to the connection between border security and Oregon's drug crisis.

== Personal life ==
Girod lives in Stayton, Oregon. His home near Lyons, in the Santiam Canyon, was destroyed in the September 2020 Santiam Fire. His parents had built the house in the late 1960s, and he had lived there on and off since.

== Electoral history ==
2006 Oregon State Representative, 17th district
| Party | Candidate | Votes | % |
|---|---|---|---|
| Republican | Fred Girod | 12,658 | 59.1 |
| Democratic | Dan Thackaberry | 8,682 | 40.5 |
| Write-in | | 91 | 0.4 |
| Total votes | | 21,431 | 100% |

2008 Oregon State Senator, 9th district
| Party | Candidate | Votes | % |
|---|---|---|---|
| Republican | Fred Girod | 31,201 | 61.1 |
| Democratic | Bob McDonald | 19,753 | 38.7 |
| Write-in | | 116 | 0.2 |
| Total votes | | 51,070 | 100% |

2012 Oregon State Senator, 9th district
| Party | Candidate | Votes | % |
|---|---|---|---|
| Republican | Fred Girod | 33,278 | 64.2 |
| Democratic | Steve Frank | 18,451 | 35.6 |
| Write-in | | 117 | 0.2 |
| Total votes | | 51,846 | 100% |

2016 Oregon State Senator, 9th district
| Party | Candidate | Votes | % |
|---|---|---|---|
| Republican | Fred Frank Girod | 40,655 | 68.7 |
| Democratic | Rich Harisay | 15,901 | 26.9 |
| Libertarian | Jack Stillwell | 2,503 | 4.2 |
| Write-in | | 120 | 0.2 |
| Total votes | | 59,179 | 100% |

2020 Oregon State Senator, 9th district
| Party | Candidate | Votes | % |
|---|---|---|---|
| Republican | Fred Frank Girod | 50,357 | 67.0 |
| Democratic | Jim Hinsvark | 22,627 | 30.1 |
| Libertarian | Patrick Marnell | 2,127 | 2.8 |
| Write-in | | 93 | 0.1 |
| Total votes | | 75,204 | 100% |

2024 Oregon State Senator, 9th district
| Party | Candidate | Votes | % |
|---|---|---|---|
| Republican | Fred Frank Girod | 49,458 | 68.9 |
| Democratic | Mike Ashland | 22,237 | 31.0 |
| Write-in | | 111 | 0.2 |
| Total votes | | 71,806 | 100% |

Oregon Senate
| Preceded by Herman Baertschiger Jr. | Minority Leader of the Oregon Senate; 2021 | Succeeded by Tim Knopp |
