= Kate Lieber =

American politician

Majority Leader of the Oregon Senate
- In office January 9, 2023 – July 15, 2024
- Preceded by: Rob Wagner
- Succeeded by: Kathleen Taylor

Member of the Oregon Senate from the 14th district
- Incumbent
- Assumed office January 11, 2021
- Preceded by: Mark Hass

Personal details
- Born: Indiana
- Party: Democratic
- Education: Smith College (BA); Indiana University, Bloomington (JD)
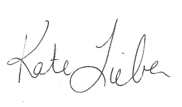
- Signature

Kate Lieber is an American attorney and politician who has represented the 14th district in the Oregon State Senate since 2021. A member of the Democratic Party, she served as Majority Leader from 2023 to 2024 and since July 2024 has been the Senate co-chair of the legislature's Joint Committee on Ways and Means.

== Professional background ==
Before her election to the Oregon Senate, Lieber worked for many years as an attorney prosecuting domestic violence and child abuse cases for the Multnomah County District Attorney's office. She was nominated by Governor Ted Kulongoski to the Psychiatric Security Review Board (PSRB), on which she served for eight years and which she chaired for five.

== Political career ==
Lieber was first inspired to run for public office after the election of Donald Trump as US President. She ran for the District 14 seat in the Oregon Senate after incumbent Democrat Mark Hass decided to run for Oregon Secretary of State, instead of re-election. She defeated Republican candidate Harmony Mulkey in the general election, winning 69% to 30.8%, with 0.2% of the vote going to other candidates.

On November 18, 2022, Lieber was elected Majority Leader by the Oregon Senate democratic caucus.

As majority leader during the 2023 session, Lieber was a frequent spokesperson for Senate Democrats during the 2023 Republican walkout, the longest legislative walkout in state history, which ended in June after a negotiated deal.

In June 2024, Senate President Rob Wagner appointed Lieber to succeed Elizabeth Steiner as Senate co-chair of the Joint Committee on Ways and Means. Lieber stepped down as majority leader and was succeeded by Kathleen Taylor. So co-chairs the committee with Representative Tawna Sanchez.

In 2024, Lieber, who co-chaired the Joint Committee on Addiction and Community Safety Response, and Representative Jason Kropf proposed House Bill 4002. The bill made possession of small amounts of controlled substances an unclassified misdemeanor punishable by up to six months in jail and encouraged counties to create deflection programs. A companion bill provided $211 million for treatment and related programs.

== Personal life ==
Lieber is gay and is the first openly lesbian member of the Oregon Senate. She lives with her wife and two children.

== Electoral history ==
2020 Oregon State Senator, 14th district
Party	Candidate	Votes	%
Democratic	Kate Lieber	48,900	69.0
Republican	Harmony K Mulkey	21,838	30.8
Write-in		141	0.2
Total votes		70,879	100%

2024 Oregon State Senator, 14th district
Party	Candidate	Votes	%
Democratic	Kate Lieber	60,002	85.0
Libertarian	Katy Brumbelow	10,149	14.4
Write-in		456	0.6
Total votes		70,607	100%

Oregon Senate
Preceded by Ginny Burdick	Majority Leader of the Oregon Senate; 2023–2024	Succeeded by Kathleen Taylor
