= Oregon's 27th Senate district =

American legislative district

Oregon's 27th Senate District as of September 27, 2021

District 27 of the Oregon State Senate comprises parts of Deschutes County centered around greater Bend. The district is composed of Oregon House districts 53 and 54. It is currently represented by Democrat Anthony Broadman of Bend.

== Election results ==
District boundaries have changed over time. Therefore, senators before 2021 may not represent the same constituency as today. From 1993 until 2003, it covered a different area in central Oregon; from 2003 until 2013, it covered most of Deschutes County; and from 2013 until 2023, it shrank slightly due to population growth, losing southern and northern portions of Deschutes County.

The current district is very similar to previous iterations, moving north to cover Bend, Redmond, and Sisters.

The results are as follows:

Year	Candidate	Party	Percent	Opponent	Party	Percent
1984	Peter M. Brockman	Republican	57.8%	Judy Carnahan	Democratic	42.2%
1988	Peter M. Brockman	Republican	54.8%	Jon Jackson	Democratic	45.2%
1992	Neil Bryant	Republican	51.9%	Bob Pickard	Democratic	48.1%
1996	Neil Bryant	Republican	100.0%	Unopposed		
2000	Beverly Clarno	Republican	69.7%	Anne N. Philiben	Democratic	30.0%
2004	Ben Westlund	Republican	83.8%	Don Loyd	Constitution	16.2%
2008	Chris Telfer	Republican	59.6%	Maren Lundgren	Democratic	40.2%
2012	Tim Knopp	Republican	58.9%	Geri Hauser	Democratic	40.6%
2016	Tim Knopp	Republican	60.6%	Greg Delgado	Democratic	39.2%
2020	Tim Knopp	Republican	50.7%	Eileen Kiely	Democratic	49.1%
2024	Anthony Broadman	Democratic	59.1%	Michael Summers	Republican	40.8%
