= Oregon's 12th Senate district =

American legislative district

Oregon's 12th Senate District as of September 27, 2021

District 12 of the Oregon State Senate comprises parts of Yamhill and Polk counties centered around Dallas, McMinnville, and Newberg. It is composed of Oregon House districts 23 and 24. It is currently represented by Republican Bruce Starr of Dundee.

== Election results ==
District boundaries have changed over time. Therefore, senators before 2021 may not represent the same constituency as today. From 1993 until 2003, the district covered parts Clackamas County; from 2003 until 2013, it shifted to cover rural western Benton, Polk, and Yamhill counties plus a small panhandle in southern Marion County and a small part of Linn County to cover the small town of Jefferson; and from 2013 until 2023, it lost some rural land in western Polk and Yamhill counties while adding parts of southern Washington County stretching north to southern Hillsboro.

The current district was consolidated slightly from its previous iterations, losing all of its land in Benton, Marion, and Washington counties while regaining almost all of Polk and Yamhill counties stretching to their western borders.

The results are as follows:

Year	Candidate	Party	Percent	Opponent	Party	Percent	Opponent	Party	Percent
1982	Walt Brown	Democratic	63.1%	Larry Burright	Republican	36.8%	No third candidate		
1986	Bill Kennemer	Republican	52.2%	Walt Brown	Democratic	47.8%	No third candidate		
1990	Bill Kennemer	Republican	57.0%	Bob Johnson	Democratic	43.0%	No third candidate		
1994	Bill Kennemer	Republican	54.3%	Dave McTeague	Democratic	45.7%	No third candidate		
1998	Verne Duncan	Republican	57.9%	Monroe Mark Sweetland	Democratic	42.1%	No third candidate		
2004	Gary George	Republican	58.7%	Hank Franzoni	Democratic	41.3%	No third candidate		
2008	Brian Boquist	Republican	60.6%	Kevin C. Nortness	Democratic	39.1%	No third candidate		
2012	Brian Boquist	Republican	60.0%	Annette Frank	Democratic	39.8%	No third candidate		
2016	Brian Boquist	Republican	62.9%	Ross Swartzendruber	Democratic	36.9%	No third candidate		
2020	Brian Boquist	Republican	58.3%	Bernadette Hansen	Democratic	41.6%	No third candidate		
2024	Bruce Starr	Republican	55.6%	Scott Hooper	Democratic	33.6%	Andrea Kennedy-Smith	Independent	10.7%
