= Brian Boquist =

Republican politician from Oregon

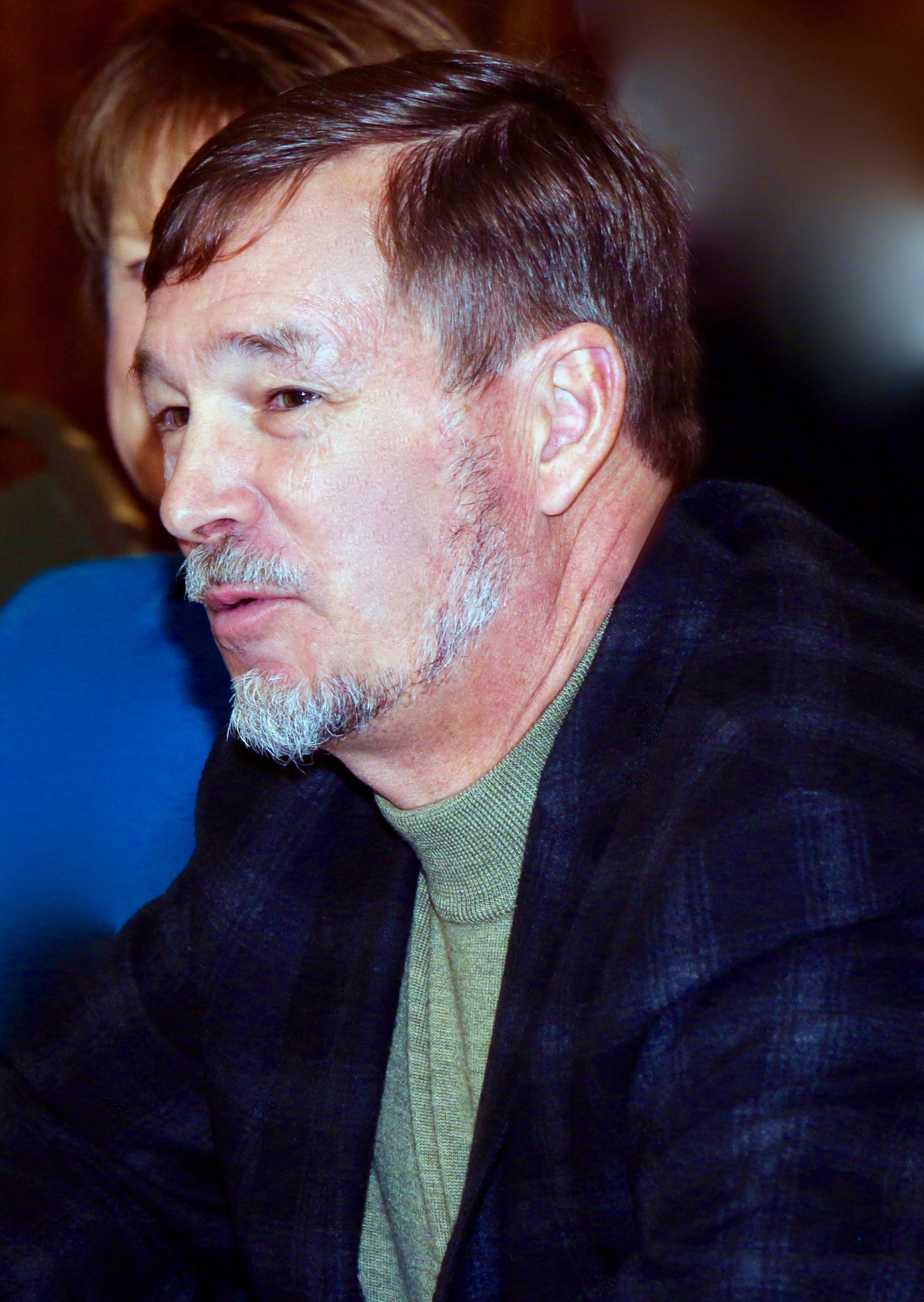

Member of the Oregon Senate from the 12th district
- In office January 2009 – January 13, 2025
- Preceded by: Gary George
- Succeeded by: Bruce Starr

Member of the Oregon House of Representatives from the 23rd district
- In office January 2005 – January 2009
- Preceded by: Lane Shetterly
- Succeeded by: Jim Thompson

Personal details
- Born: Brian James Boquist; October 20, 1958 (age 67) Tillamook, Oregon, U.S.
- Party: Republican (before 2021, 2023–present); Independent Party (2021–2023)
- Spouse(s): Peggy (née Bainter; born April 29, 1955 in Portland, Oregon)
- Education: Western Oregon University (BS); Oregon State University (MBA)

Military service
- Allegiance: United States
- Branch/service: United States Army Reserve
- Years of service: 1975–2012
- Rank: Lieutenant Colonel
- Battles/wars: Iraq War
- Awards: Bronze Star; Iraq Campaign Medal; National Defense Service Medal

Brian James Boquist (born October 20, 1958) is an American politician from Oregon. He served in the Oregon Senate representing District 12 from 2009 until 2025. A member of the Republican Party, he briefly defected to the Independent Party from 2021 until 2023. He previously served in the Oregon House of Representatives, representing District 23 in the mid-Willamette Valley, from 2005 to 2009.

== Early life and career ==
Boquist was born and raised on a dairy farm in Tillamook, Oregon. He attained the rank of Eagle Scout in the Boy Scouts of America, graduated from Tillamook High School, and enlisted in the United States Army in 1975. He earned a Bachelor of Science degree from Western Oregon State College (now Western Oregon University) and an MBA from Oregon State University.

Boquist is a former career special forces lieutenant colonel who served in branches of the United States Army. He is a director with International Charter Incorporated, an international services company that specializes in a variety of support operations for private organizations and the United States government. ICI has worked in Africa, Asia, the Middle East, and South America. Additionally, ICI was involved in pre-deployment training of armed services members during OEF and OIF from 2006 to 2012. Boquist is involved with several other business entities primarily in the agriculture and forestry industry. He served as Deputy Commander and Chief of Staff of the Joint Combined Special Operations Task Force in Iraq in 2003–2004, receiving the Bronze Star Medal and recommendation for promotion for his service.

== Political career ==
Boquist ran for the U.S. Senate in 1996, taking less than 1% in the Republican primary. In 2000, he was the Republican nominee for the United States House of Representatives in Oregon's 5th congressional district, but lost with 43% of the vote to incumbent Darlene Hooley. Boquist challenged Darlene Hooley in the 2002 General Election, losing a second time with 45% of the vote.

In 2004, Boquist decided against a run for Hooley's seat, but when state Representative Lane Shetterly resigned to run the Oregon Department of Land Conservation and Development commission, Boquist chose instead to run for Shetterly's seat in Oregon House District 23. Though Jim Thompson was named by Oregon Republicans to complete Shetterly's term, Boquist defeated him in the Republican primary and went on to win the general election with 61% (17,390) of the vote. Boquist was re-elected to the Oregon House of Representatives in 2006 with 58% (13,422) of the vote.

In the 2008 Republican primary, Boquist announced that he was leaving the Oregon House to seek election to the state Senate. He was unopposed for his party's nomination to represent Oregon Senate District 12 and faced Democrat Kevin Nortness in the general election. He won the general election 61% to 39% garnering 33,264 votes. (Jim Thompson, whom Boquist defeated for the state House in 2004, won the election with 15,878 votes to succeed Boquist in the House.) Boquist was re-elected the Oregon State Senate in 2012 with 60% of the vote, garnering 34,038 votes.

=== 2019 Republican walkout ===
In June 2019, as part of a quorum-busting effort, Boquist and 11 other Republican Senators walked out of a vote on a cap and trade resolution to reduce carbon emissions that cause climate change. Because the Oregon Constitution, requires a quorum of two-thirds of senators (i.e., 20 senators) to be present to transact business, the remaining 18 senators could not meet. Some of the dozen Republican senators who left the Oregon State Capitol claimed to have left the state.

The previous day, Oregon governor Kate Brown, on learning of the upcoming walkout, said she was going to send the State Police to round up state legislators who failed to attend (the Oregon Constitution allows police to detain recusant Senators).

On June 19, 2019, in a floor speech immediately before Republicans left the state, Boquist told Peter Courtney, the Senate's Democratic president, "If you send the State Police to get me, hell is coming to visit you personally." The next day, Boquist told a local television news crew that he had told the state police superintendent, "Send bachelors and come heavily armed. I'm not going to be a political prisoner in the state of Oregon." Although several Republican state senators returned to the Senate chamber on June 29, 2019, leading to the cap and trade bill being sent back to committee, while other bills were passed, Boquist was absent, as he was asked not to return due to other state senators feeling unsafe from his previous comments. He returned to the Capitol after a nine-day walkout.

The threat of violence prompted the state Senate's Special Committee on Conduct to hold a hearing on Boquist's comment. Boquist subsequently apologized to Courtney for his remark, but did not retract his statements. The legislature's outside attorney responsible for handling workplace issues within the legislature determined that Boquist's statements violated the legislature's rule banning workplace harassment, and constituted "credible threats of violence directed at the senate president and Oregon state police." In July 2019, the four-member committee (which is equally split between Democrats and Republicans), chaired by Floyd Prozanski, opted against temporarily barring Boquist from the Capitol, but unanimously voted to require him to give 12 hours' advance notice to the secretary of the senate before coming to the Capitol, giving officials more time to arrange for additional state troopers to provide security.

Boquist sued Courtney, Prozanski, and others over the "12-hour rule" imposed on him, alleging that the discipline violated his First Amendment rights and retaliated against him for constitutionally protected speech. A federal district court dismissed the case, but in April 2022 the U.S. Court of Appeals for the Ninth Circuit allowed his suit to proceed. Boquist missed every day of the 2022 legislative session, citing health reasons. In November 2022, the Special Committee on Conduct, in a 3–1 vote, lifted the safety restrictions against Boquist.

=== 2023 unexcused absences ===
In May 2023, Boquist and two Senate Republicans (Dennis Linthicum and Daniel Bonham) orchestrated rolling walkouts to deprive the Senate of a two-thirds quorum, blocking the body from passing legislation. Boquist and other frequent absentees were disqualified from reelection for accumulating 10 unexcused absences during the legislative session. The disqualification was automatic under Ballot Measure 113, which passed the year before. After a challenge from five Republican Senators the measure was unanimously upheld by the Oregon Supreme Court on February 1, 2024, confirming Boquist's disqualification after the end of his term in January 2025.

=== 2024 run for State Treasurer ===
On March 12, 2024, Boquist announced his candidacy for state treasurer in the 2024 election, running as a Republican. He won the Republican primary unopposed. Boquist was defeated by fellow Oregon senator Elizabeth Steiner in the general election.

== Personal life ==
Boquist and his wife Peggy (née Bainter; born April 29, 1955 in Portland, Oregon) have six adult children and live near Dallas, Oregon. They were married November 17th, 1990 in Portland, Oregon. Their son Sethan Charles Sprague committed suicide on February 16, 2016 at age 31. Their deceased son Sethan and one of their other sons named Samuel A Sprague are both Peggy's from her previous marriage to Karl Rogers Sprague. Boquist is a practicing Roman Catholic, and at one point attended mass at the same Salem parish as former Democratic Oregon senate president Peter Courtney.

== Electoral history ==
2004 Oregon State Representative, 23rd district
Party	Candidate	Votes	%
Republican	Brian Boquist	17,390	61.0
Democratic	Dick Reynolds	9,946	34.9
Libertarian	Paul Delaney	1,087	3.8
Write-in		73	0.3
Total votes		28,496	100%

2006 Oregon State Representative, 23rd district
Party	Candidate	Votes	%
Republican	Brian Boquist	13,422	58.0
Democratic	Jason Brown	8,760	37.8
Libertarian	Paul Delaney	942	4.1
Write-in		27	0.1
Total votes		23,151	100%

2008 Oregon State Senator, 12th district
Party	Candidate	Votes	%
Republican	Brian J Boquist	33,264	60.6
Democratic	Kevin C Nortness	21,480	39.1
Write-in		130	0.2
Total votes		54,874	100%

2012 Oregon State Senator, 12th district
Party	Candidate	Votes	%
Republican	Brian J Boquist	34,038	60.0
Democratic	Annette Frank	22,535	39.8
Write-in		117	0.2
Total votes		56,690	100%

2016 Oregon State Senator, 12th district
Party	Candidate	Votes	%
Republican	Brian J Boquist	39,908	62.9
Democratic	Ross Swartzendruber	23,441	36.9
Write-in		137	0.2
Total votes		63,486	100%

2020 Oregon State Senator, 12th district
Party	Candidate	Votes	%
Republican	Brian J Boquist	45,391	58.3
Democratic	Bernadette Hansen	32,389	41.6
Write-in		115	0.1
Total votes		77,895	100%

2024 Oregon State Treasurer election
Party	Candidate	Votes	%
Democratic	Elizabeth Steiner	1,050,119	49.4
Republican	Brian J Boquist	919,794	43.2
Working Families	Mary King	155,473	7.3
Write-in		1,882	0.1
Total votes		2,127,268	100%

== See also ==
- 74th Oregon Legislative Assembly
- 75th Oregon Legislative Assembly
- 76th Oregon Legislative Assembly
- 77th Oregon Legislative Assembly
- 78th Oregon Legislative Assembly
