= Wlnsvey Campos =

American politician

Member of the Oregon Senate from the 18th district
- Incumbent
- Assumed office January 9, 2023
- Preceded by: Akasha Lawrence-Spence

Member of the Oregon House of Representatives from the 28th district
- In office January 11, 2021 – January 9, 2023
- Preceded by: Jeff Barker
- Succeeded by: Dacia Grayber

Personal details
- Born: November 30, 1995 (age 30) Los Angeles, California
- Party: Democratic
- Education: Pacific University (BA)
- Website: https://www.camposfororegon.com

Wlnsvey Campos (first name pronounced wins-vay) (born November 30, 1995) is an American politician who serves in the Oregon State Senate. She assumed office in January 2023.

== Early life and education ==
Campos was born in Los Angeles, California, the daughter of immigrants, and raised in Bandon, Oregon. She earned a Bachelor of Arts degree in political science and philosophy from Pacific University.

== Career ==
Campos worked as a caseworker for Family Promise of Beaverton, a homeless shelter in Washington County, Oregon. She also managed a campaign for the Hillsboro School Board and was a political organizer for the Oregon Nurses Association and Our Oregon.

== Political career ==
=== Oregon House of Representatives ===
After incumbent representative Jeff Barker opted not to seek re-election to the Oregon House of Representatives, Campos announced her candidacy to succeed him. After winning the Democratic primary, she defeated Republican Daniel Martin. She assumed office on January 11, 2021. Only 24 at the time of election, Campos was one of the youngest state legislators in the United States. She was sworn in on January 11, 2021.

=== Oregon Senate ===
In November 2021, Campos announced that she would run for Senate District 18, an open seat that had been held by Ginny Burdick untl Burdick's resignation to serve on the Northwest Power and Conservation Council. Campos won the Democratic primary in May 2022 and the special general election in November 2022, defeating Republican Kimberly Rice and unaffiliated candidate Rich Vial. At 26, she became the youngest state senator in Oregon history. She was re-elected in 2024.

In the Senate, Campos was an assistant majority leader in 2023, and in November 2024 was named deputy majority leader by the Senate Democratic caucus. She also co-chaired the Legislative BIPOC Caucus with Representative Ricki Ruiz.

In 2025, Campos was the chief sponsor of Senate Bill 599, which prohibits landlords from asking about or disclosing a tenant's immigration status and requires them to accept a range of identity documents.

== Electoral history ==
2020 Oregon State Representative, 28th district
Party	Candidate	Votes	%
Democratic	Wlnsvey E Campos	21,563	65.1
Republican	Daniel R Martin	11,462	34.6
Write-in		73	0.2
Total votes		33,098	100%

2022 Oregon State Senator, 18th district (2 year term)
Party	Candidate	Votes	%
Democratic	Wlnsvey E Campos	30,534	56.5
Republican	Kimberly Rice	17,848	33.0
Independent	Rich Vial	5,599	10.4
Write-in		59	0.1
Total votes		54,040	100%

2024 Oregon State Senator, 18th district
Party	Candidate	Votes	%
Democratic	Wlnsvey E Campos	38,956	62.7
Republican	Brian Pierson	23,114	37.2
Write-in		65	0.1
Total votes		62,135	100%
