= Roger Beyer =

American politician (born 1960)

Member of the Oregon State Senate from the 9th district
- In office 2001–2007
- Preceded by: Marylin Shannon
- Succeeded by: Fred Girod

Member of the Oregon House of Representatives from the 28th district
- In office 1997–2001
- Preceded by: Cedric Hayden
- Succeeded by: Tootie Smith

Personal details
- Born: September 14, 1960 (age 65) Oregon City, Oregon, U.S.
- Party: Republican
- Profession: Christmas tree producer/lobbyist

Roger Beyer (born September 14, 1960) is a Republican politician from the U.S. state of Oregon, who most recently served in the Oregon State Senate, representing district 9, which includes parts of Clackamas, Linn, and Marion County, Oregon counties.

== Early life and career ==
Beyer grew up in Molalla, Oregon and graduated from Molalla Union High School. He earned a bachelor of science degree in horticulture from Oregon State University, and operated a Christmas tree farm in Molalla.

== Political career ==
In 1996, Beyer was elected to the Oregon House of Representatives representing District 28 in southern Clackamas County. He was re-elected to the seat in 1998. In 2000, he won election to a vacant Oregon State Senate seat. He served as Senate minority leader for the 2003 session, and was easily re-elected to a second term in 2004.

In January 2007, Beyer resigned from the Senate to become executive secretary for the Oregon Seed Council, an organization which lobbies on behalf of Oregon's grass seed growers.
