= Oregon's 14th Senate district =

U.S. state legislative district

Oregon's 14th Senate District as of September 27, 2021

Oregon's 14th Senate district comprises parts of Washington and Multnomah counties, including much of Beaverton and southwest Portland. It contains Oregon House districts 27 and 28. It is currently represented by Democrat Kate Lieber of Beaverton.

== Election results ==
District boundaries have changed over time. Therefore, senators before 2013 may not represent the same constituency as today. From 1993 until 2003, the district covered parts of Clackamas County; from 2003 until 2013, it shifted to cover most of Beaverton and Aloha south of Beaverton-Hillsdale Highway as well as Sylvan and West Slope; and from 2013 until 2023, it lost much of its land in Multnomah County while gaining the Progress Ridge neighborhood of south Beaverton.

The current district is slightly reconfigured, gaining back much of southwest Portland between the Sunset Highway and SW Taylors Ferry Road/I-5, including parts of downtown Portland, and adding Cedar Hills, but losing all of Aloha and much of Beaverton, including the Central Beaverton neighborhood.

The results are as follows:

Year	Candidate	Party	Percent	Opponent	Party	Percent	Opponent	Party	Percent
1982	Steve Starkovich	Democratic	56.8%	Joe Davis	Republican	43.2%	No third candidate		
1986	Bob Kintigh	Republican	51.3%	Steve Starkovich	Democratic	48.7%	No third candidate		
1990	Bob Kintigh	Republican	53.3%	Jack Elder	Democratic	46.7%	No third candidate		
1994	Ken Baker	Republican	54.0%	Jay Watts	Democratic	40.8%	Lindsey Bradshaw	Libertarian	5.2%
1998	Rick Metsger	Democratic	56.4%	Jerry Grisham	Republican	43.6%	No third candidate		
2004	Ryan Deckert	Democratic	64.0%	Jay Omdahl	Republican	36.0%	No third candidate		
2008	Mark Hass	Democratic	68.0%	Lisa Michaels	Republican	31.9%	No third candidate		
2012	Mark Hass	Democratic	60.4%	Gary Coe	Republican	36.7%	Mark Vetanen	Libertarian	2.7%
2016	Mark Hass	Democratic	97.2%	Unopposed					
2020	Kate Lieber	Democratic	69.0%	Harmony Mulkey	Republican	30.8%	No third candidate		
2024	Kate Lieber	Democratic	85.0%	Katy Brumbelow	Libertarian	14.4%	No third candidate		
