= Oregon's 18th Senate district =

American legislative district

Oregon's 18th Senate District as of September 27, 2021

District 18 of the Oregon State Senate comprises parts of central Washington County centered around Aloha and encompassing parts of Beaverton and Hillsboro. It is composed of Oregon House districts 35 and 36. It is currently represented by Democrat Wlnsvey Campos of Aloha.

== Election results ==
District boundaries have changed over time. Therefore, senators before 2021 may not represent the same constituency as today. From 1993 until 2003, the district covered parts of the western Willamette Valley; from 2003 until 2013, it covered Tigard and parts of southwest and downtown Portland; and from 2013 until 2023, it only shifted slightly, covering more of downtown Portland as well as the city of Durham and a small chunk of Clackamas County. The results are as follows:

Year	Candidate	Party	Percent	Opponent	Party	Percent	Opponent	Party	Percent
1982	Clifford W. Trow	Democratic	62.4%	Bob Jackson	Republican	37.6%	No third candidate		
1986	Clifford W. Trow	Democratic	58.4%	Win Eaton	Republican	41.6%	No third candidate		
1990	Clifford W. Trow	Democratic	51.7%	Kathleen Kessinger	Republican	48.3%	No third candidate		
1994	Clifford W. Trow	Democratic	54.9%	Rich Rodeman	Republican	45.1%	No third candidate		
1998	Clifford W. Trow	Democratic	58.2%	Win Eaton	Republican	41.8%	No third candidate		
2004	Ginny Burdick	Democratic	62.5%	John Wight	Republican	34.1%	No third candidate		
2008	Ginny Burdick	Democratic	70.0%	John Wight	Republican	29.7%	No third candidate		
2012	Ginny Burdick	Democratic	69.3%	Suzanne Gallagher	Republican	30.4%	No third candidate		
2016	Ginny Burdick	Democratic	97.4%	Unopposed					
2020	Ginny Burdick	Democratic	95.8%	Unopposed					
2022 (Note: Off-cycle election for a two-year term due to redistricting.)	Wlnsvey Campos	Democratic	56.5%	Kimberly Rice	Republican	33.0%	Rich Vial	(Note: Rich Vial ran as a non-affiliated candidate without a party affiliation.)	10.4%
