= Oregon State Senate =

Upper house of Oregon's legislature

- Oregon Legislative Assembly

Type
- Type: Upper house
- Term limits: None

History
- New session started: January 21, 2025

Leadership
- President: Rob Wagner (D) since January 9, 2023
- President pro tempore: James Manning Jr. (D) since January 11, 2021
- Majority Leader: Kayse Jama (D) since November 16, 2024
- Minority Leader: Bruce Starr (R) since September 15, 2025

Structure
- Seats: 30
- Political groups: Majority: Democratic (18); Minority: Republican (12)
- Length of term: 4 years
- Authority: Article IV, Oregon Constitution
- Salary: $21,612/year + per diem

Elections
- Last election: November 5, 2024 (15 seats)
- Next election: November 3, 2026 (15 seats)
- Redistricting: Legislative Control

Meeting place
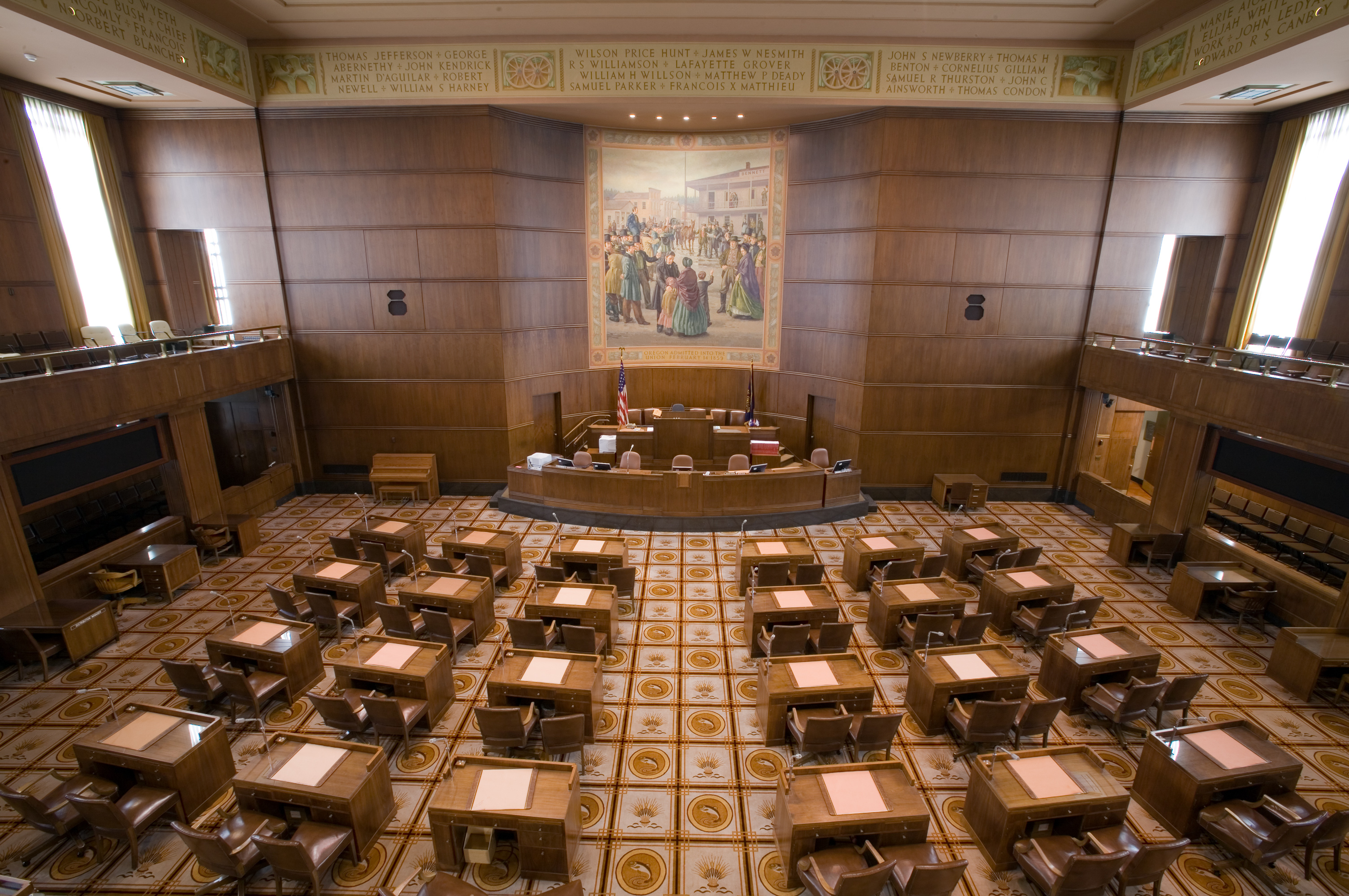
- State Senate Chamber; Oregon State Capitol; Salem, Oregon

Website
- Oregon State Senate

The Oregon State Senate is the upper house of the state legislature for the U.S. state of Oregon. Along with the lower chamber Oregon House of Representatives it makes up the Oregon Legislative Assembly. There are 30 members of the state Senate, representing 30 districts across the state, each with a population of 141,242. The state Senate meets in the east wing of the Oregon State Capitol in Salem.

Oregon, along with Arizona, Maine, New Hampshire, and Wyoming, is one of the five U.S. states to not have the office of the lieutenant governor, a position which for most upper houses of state legislatures and for the United States Congress (with the vice president) is the head of the legislative body and holder of the casting vote in the event of a tie. Instead, a separate position of Senate president is in place, removed from the state executive branch. If the chamber is tied, legislators must devise their own methods of resolving the impasse. In the 72nd Oregon Legislative Assembly in 2003, for example, Oregon's state senators entered into a power sharing contract whereby Democratic senators nominated the Senate President while Republican senators chaired key committees.

Like certain other upper houses of state and territorial legislatures and the United States Senate, the state Senate can confirm or reject the governor's appointments to state departments, commissions, boards, and other state governmental agencies.

The current Senate president is Rob Wagner of Lake Oswego.

== Membership and qualifications ==
Oregon state senators serve four-year terms without term limits. In 2002, the Oregon Supreme Court struck down the decade-old Oregon Ballot Measure 3, that had restricted state senators to two terms (eight years) on procedural grounds.

According to the Oregon Constitution, two-thirds of senators are required to form a quorum. Republican senators have used this rule to block legislation by absenting themselves. In response to this practice, Oregon Ballot Measure 113 was passed in 2022 to disqualify members with ten unexcused absences from serving in the legislature following their current term. However, a Republican walkout went for six weeks during the 82nd Assembly in May and June 2023, the longest ever.

== Milestones ==
Kathryn Clarke was the first woman to serve in Oregon's Senate. Women became eligible to run for the Oregon state legislature in 1914 and later that year Clarke was appointed to fill a vacant seat in Douglas county by her cousin, Governor Oswald West. Following some controversy concerning whether West had the authority to appoint someone to fill the vacancy, Clarke campaigned and was elected by voters in 1915. She took office five years before Nineteenth Amendment to the United States Constitution protected the right of all American women to vote.

In 1982, Mae Yih became the first Chinese-American elected to a state senate in the United States.

== Composition ==
Affiliation	Party (Shading indicates majority caucus)				Total	Vacant
Affiliation	Democratic	Republican	IR	Independent	Total	Vacant
End of 75th Assembly (2010)	18	12	0	0	30	0
76th Assembly (2011–2012)	16	14	0	0	30	0
77th Assembly (2013–2014)	16	14	0	0	30	0
78th Assembly (2015–2016)	18	12	0	0	30	0
79th Assembly (2017–2019)	17	13	0	0	30	0
80th Assembly (2019–2021)	18	12	0	0	30	0
Begin 81st Assembly (2021–2023)	18	12	0		30	0
January 15, 2021 (Note: Republican Brian Boquist (District 12) changed his party registration from Republican to Independent Party of Oregon.)	18	11	0	1	30	0
April 2021 (Note: Senator Art Robinson (District 2) left the Republican caucus in order to caucus with Boquist.)	18	10	1	1	30	0
82nd Assembly (2023–2025)	17	11	1	1	30	0
83rd Assembly (2025–2027)	18	12	0		30	0
April 19, 2025 (Note: Democrat Aaron Woods (District 13) died.)	17	12	0		29	1
May 9, 2025 (Note: Democrat Courtney Neron Misslin appointed to fill vacancy in District 13.)	18	12	0		30	0
October 5, 2025 (Note: Republican Daniel Bonham (District 26) resigned.)	18	11	0		29	0
October 23, 2025 (Note: Republican Christine Drazan appointed to fill vacancy in District 26.)	18	12	0		30	0
Latest voting share	60%	40%				

== Current session ==
=== Oregon State Senate leadership ===
Position	Representative	District	Party	Residence
Senate President	Rob Wagner	19	Democratic	Lake Oswego
Senate President Pro Tempore	James I. Manning Jr.	7	Democratic	Eugene
Majority Leader	Kayse Jama	24	Democratic	Portland
Senate Deputy Majority Leader	Wlnsvey Campos	18	Democratic	Aloha
Majority Whip	Sara Gelser Blouin	8	Democratic	Corvallis
Senate Deputy Majority Whip	Lew Frederick	22	Democratic	Portland
Assistant Majority Leaders	Janeen Sollman	15	Democratic	Hillsboro
Assistant Majority Leaders	Khanh Pham	23	Democratic	Portland
Minority Leader	Bruce Starr	12	Republican	Dundee
Deputy Minority Leaders	Cedric Hayden	6	Republican	Fall Creek
Deputy Minority Leaders	Dick Anderson	5	Republican	Lincoln City
Deputy Minority Leaders	David Brock Smith	1	Republican	Port Orford
Minority Whip	Suzanne Weber	16	Republican	Tillamook

=== Current members ===
District	Name	Party	Residence	Start
1	David Smith	Republican	Port Orford	2023
2	Noah Robinson	Republican	Cave Junction	2025
3	Jeff Golden	Democratic	Ashland	2019
4	Floyd Prozanski	Democratic	Eugene	2004
5	Dick Anderson	Republican	Lincoln City	2021
6	Cedric Hayden	Republican	Fall Creek	2023
7	James Manning	Democratic	Eugene	2021
8	Sara Gelser Blouin	Democratic	Corvallis	2015
9	Fred Girod	Republican	Stayton	2008
10	Deb Patterson	Democratic	Salem	2021
11	Kim Thatcher	Republican	Keizer	2023
12	Bruce Starr	Republican	Dundee	2025
13	Courtney Neron Misslin	Democratic	Wilsonville	2025
14	Kate Lieber	Democratic	Beaverton	2021
15	Janeen Sollman	Democratic	Hillsboro	2022
16	Suzanne Weber	Republican	Tillamook	2023
17	Lisa Reynolds	Democratic	North Bethany	2024
18	Wlnsvey Campos	Democratic	Aloha	2023
19	Rob Wagner	Democratic	Lake Oswego	2023
20	Mark Meek	Democratic	Gladstone	2023
21	Kathleen Taylor	Democratic	Portland	2017
22	Lew Frederick	Democratic	Portland	2017
23	Khanh Pham	Democratic	Portland	2025
24	Kayse Jama	Democratic	Portland	2024
25	Chris Gorsek	Democratic	Troutdale	2021
26	Christine Drazan	Republican	Canby	2025
27	Anthony Broadman	Democratic	Bend	2025
28	Diane Linthicum	Republican	Beatty	2025
29	Todd Nash	Republican	Enterprise	2025
30	Mike McLane	Republican	Powell Butte	2025

== See also ==
- 2024 Oregon State Senate election
- List of Oregon Legislative Assemblies
