= Daniel Bonham =

Member of the Oregon State Senate

Minority Leader of the Oregon State Senate
- In office April 15, 2024 – September 15, 2025
- Preceded by: Tim Knopp
- Succeeded by: Bruce Starr

Member of the Oregon State Senate from the 26th district
- In office January 1, 2023 – October 5, 2025
- Preceded by: Chuck Thomsen
- Succeeded by: Christine Drazan

Member of the Oregon House of Representatives from the 59th district
- In office November 20, 2017 – January 1, 2023
- Preceded by: John Huffman
- Succeeded by: Vikki Breese-Iverson

Personal details
- Born: June 3, 1977 (age 49) Novato, California, U.S.
- Party: Republican
- Education: Linfield University (BA)
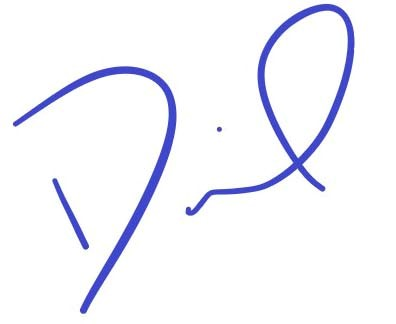
- Signature
- Website: Campaign website

Daniel Bonham (born June 3, 1977) is an American politician. A member of the Republican party, he served as a member of the Oregon State Senate from 2023 to 2025, and served as minority leader from 2024 to 2025. He represented the 26th district, encompassing rural Clackamas County and parts of Wasco, Hood River, and east Multnomah Counties making up the Columbia River Gorge. Prior to that, he served as a member of the Oregon House of Representatives from 2017 to 2023, appointed to replace Representative John Huffman after his resignation.

== Biography ==
Bonham was raised in Tigard, Oregon, and graduated from Tigard High School in 1995. He received a bachelor's degree in business from Linfield College in 1999. Bonham then worked for Evergreen International Aviation and RB Rubber Products in McMinnville, before moving to The Dalles in 2007, where he purchased Maupin's Stove and Spas.

Bonham lost his wife, Lori, to cancer in December 2022. Daniel has two children: Jennifer and Jack.

In early 2023, Bonham was injured in a House vs. Senate basketball game. Democratic Representative Hai Pham, a dentist, administered emergency care in the stadium.

== Career ==
Bonham was previously on The Dalles City Budget Committee as well as The Dalles Urban Renewal Budget Committee.

=== Oregon Legislature ===
In 2017, Representative John Huffman resigned. Bonham was appointed by county commissioners to fill the vacancy.

Bonham served as Deputy House Minority Leader from 2019 to 2022. Bonham was one of the only Republicans in the house to vote in favor of the Oregon Family Leave Act.

Bonham was elected to the State Senate in 2022, the first election since redistricting. Bonham won with 59.2% of the vote. He was the only Republican endorsed by the Willamette Week in 2022, and was called "the most sensible Republican we met this cycle". He served as Deputy Senate Minority Leader. Bonham became Senate Minority Leader on April 15, 2024, as the current leader, Tim Knopp, resigned from the position due to his ineligibility to seek reelection in 2024.

On September 15, 2025, Bonham resigned as Minority Leader and announced he would resign from the Senate on October 5. He endorsed House Minority Leader Christine Drazan to serve the remainder of his term, which ends in January 2027. His seat remained vacant until October 23, when the Multnomah, Clackamas, Hood River, and Wasco County Commissions appointed Drazan to serve the remainder of his term.

==== Committees ====
- House Committee of Early Child Development and Family Supports, 2018 Session (Vice-chair)
- House Transportation Committee, 2018 Session
- House Energy and Environment Committee, 2018 Session
- House Committee on Economic Development, 2019 Session (Vice-chair)
- House Committee on Business and Labor, 2019 Session
- Joint Committees on Carbon Reduction, 2019 Session
- Ways and Means Subcommittee on General Government, 2019 Session
- Senate Interim Committee on Labor & Business, 2024 Session (Vice-chair)
- Senate Interim Committee on Healthcare, 2024 Session
- Joint Interim Committee on Ways and Means, Subcommittee on General Government, 2024 Session

==== Workgroups & Councils ====
- Rural Policy Workgroup, 2018 Session (chair)
- Paid Family & Medical Leave Workgroup, 2018 Session
- Legislative Council on River Governance, 2018 Session

=== 2023 unexcused absences ===
On May 15, 2023, Bonham, along with 8 other Republicans and 1 Independent in the senate, were disqualified from seeking reelection by Oregon Secretary of State LaVonne Griffin-Valade because they had accumulated more than 10 unexcused absences over the course of the legislative session. The new rule was the result of a recently passed ballot measure aimed at preventing future walkouts. Bonham and 4 other Senators filed a lawsuit in response, arguing that the measure's wording allowed them to serve one additional term before being barred from reelection. On October 24 the Oregon Supreme Court agreed to hear the case with arguments beginning December 14. On February 1, 2024, the Court unanimously ruled against the Republican Senators, confirming Bonham's disqualification after his current term ends in January 2027.

== Political positions ==
=== Abortion ===
Regarding abortion, Bonham describes himself as "a right-to-life person" but "a man who believes in the rule of law." He says that he opposes abortion in most cases with exception in the case of rape or to protect the life of the mother. He admits that Oregon is a heavily pro-choice state and that abortion likely will not be criminalized, but says that there is likely room for negotiation in regards to third-trimester abortions.

=== Business and economy ===
Bonham supports broadening the tax base through reduction of taxes and allowing business to grow. He believes increasing the economy would increase tax revenue which allows the state to investment in the educational system and support reasonable social services.

=== Education ===
Bonham has stated "Oregon has no greater obligation than to ensure it is providing the resources necessary for a quality education. A stronger education system means greater opportunities for the future of our kids, community, industry, and our state."

=== Family & medical leave ===
Bonham was one of the only Republicans in the house to vote in favor of the Oregon Family Leave Act.

=== Healthcare ===
Bonham says that he does not believe Medicare actually provides needed services and that "an open, free market is a better system than government regulation."

=== Rural issues ===
According to Bonham, "The challenges facing our rural communities are often overlooked in Salem."

Daniel was one of the chief sponsors of a campaign to bring broadband access to the small town of Maupin, Oregon.

=== Texas ===
Following the Standoff at Eagle Pass, Bonham signed a letter in support of Texas Governor Greg Abbott's decision in the conflict.

== Notes ==
Oregon Senate
Preceded by Tim Knopp	Minority Leader of the Oregon Senate; 2024–2025	Succeeded by Bruce Starr
