= 2022 Oregon Ballot Measure 113 =

Ballot Measure 113
- Exclusion from Re-election for Legislative Absenteeism Initiative

Results
Choice	Votes	%
Yes	1,292,127	68.32%
No	599,204	31.68%
Total votes	1,891,331	100.00%
- Yes: 50–60% 60–70% 70–80% No: 50–60%

Oregon Ballot Measure 113, the Exclusion from Re-election for Legislative Absenteeism Initiative, was approved by Oregon voters in the 2022 Oregon elections. Measure 113 amended the Constitution of Oregon to provide that members of the Oregon Legislature with ten unexcused absences from floor sessions are disqualified from serving in the legislature following their current term. It is codified as Article IV, Section 15 of the Oregon Constitution.

== Background and provisions ==
Unlike most state legislatures (in which a majority is a sufficient quorum), the Oregon Constitution requires that two-thirds of the Oregon State Senate or Oregon House of Representatives be present to conduct a session. The purpose of this amendment is to discourage members of the minority party from walking out (i.e., being intentionally absent) from legislative sessions in order to block passing new laws that they do not have the voting majority to prevent through normal democratic processes. Measure 113 was a response to Republican members of the legislature, who in the three years before Measure 113's passage (from 2019 to 2022) repeatedly walked out of the State Capitol to block Democrats from passing Democratic legislative priorities, including a business tax to fund education and greenhouse gas cap-and-trade legislation to limit Oregon's carbon emissions.

In 2022, a Republican walkout forced the 2020 legislative session to end early, effectively killing many bills. Republicans also used the tactic to block vaccine and gun bills. The Republicans' use of a walkout three years in a row was unprecedented; previous Oregon walkouts were rare. Democrats had last used the strategy in 2001, when they were in the legislative minority, to block a Republican attempt to draw the boundaries of legislative districts (the Republican-controlled House had tried to pass their redistricting plan as a resolution rather than a bill, an attempt to evade a veto from then-Governor John Kitzhaber, a Democrat).

Prior to 2022, Oregon law provided that legislators may be compelled to attend floor sessions or expelled (by a two-thirds majority) for "disorderly behavior"; however, there were no automatic consequences for failure to attend sessions, nor is "disorderly behavior" clearly defined. This allowed legislators to abscond out of state (beyond the reach of Oregon law enforcement) during walkouts, and then return without consequence. Under Measure 113, the state Constitution was amended so that state Senators and state Representatives with ten unexcused absences from either a regular or a special floor sessions of the legislature are barred from holding office as a legislator for the term following their current term of office. Measure 113 also clarified that a failure to attend ten or more legislative floor sessions in a session constitutes "disorderly behavior” through unexcused absences is disqualified from serving as a Senator or Representative for the term following the end of the legislator’s current term.

== Campaign ==
Measure 113 was supported by Oregon Democrats and their allies in labor unions and other groups. No formal opposition to Measure 113 was organized, but The Oregonian/OregonLive, the Bend Bulletin and the Willamette Week all endorsed a "no" vote on the grounds that the measure would give too much power to the Senate president and the House speaker to determine when a member's absence should count as excused or unexcused, and because it could infringe on the rights of Oregonians to elect their preferred candidates to represent them in the Legislature.

== Passage ==
In the general election in November 2022, Oregon voters approved Measure 113 by an overwhelming majority, passing in all but two counties and in all six of Oregon's congressional districts. The results were 1,292,127 "yes" votes (68.32%) and 599,204 "no" votes (31.68%).

County	Yes	Votes	No	Votes	Total
Baker	56.15	4,696	43.85	3,668	8,364
Benton	75.58	33,329	24.42	10,767	44,096
Clackamas	67.37	139,510	32.63	67,651	207,071
Clatsop	69.88	13,501	30.12	5,819	19,320
Columbia	61.56	16,136	38.44	10,075	26,211
Coos	62.75	19,199	37.25	11,397	30,596
Crook	54.53	7,450	45.47	6,212	13,662
Curry	61.25	7,610	38.75	4,814	12,424
Deschutes	70.24	74,597	29.76	31,613	106,210
Douglas	57.31	30,403	42.69	22,649	53,052
Gilliam	53.18	510	46.82	449	959
Grant	52.14	2,099	47.86	1,927	4,026
Harney	50.47	1,890	49.53	1,855	3,745
Hood River	74.56	7,858	25.44	2,681	10,539
Jackson	64.74	66,006	35.26	35,944	101,950
Jefferson	58.31	5,707	41.69	4,080	9,787
Josephine	55.41	23,086	44.59	18,576	41,662
Klamath	53.58	15,719	46.42	13,620	29,339
Lake	48.55	1,877	51.45	1,989	3,866
Lane	73.12	130,503	26.88	47,976	178,479
Lincoln	74.54	18,903	25.46	6,458	25,361
Linn	56.37	33,792	43.63	26,151	59,943
Malheur	57.42	5,093	42.58	3,777	8,870
Marion	62.06	80,859	37.94	49,443	130,302
Morrow	56.84	2,272	43.16	1,725	3,997
Multnomah	76.79	271,190	23.21	81,963	353,153
Polk	62.29	25,162	37.71	15,233	40,395
Sherman	42.61	421	57.39	567	988
Tillamook	67.29	9,529	32.71	4,632	14,161
Umatilla	54.19	13,249	45.81	11,201	24,450
Union	54.25	6,592	45.75	4,165	12,151
Wallowa	57.79	2,577	42.21	1,882	4,459
Wasco	62.49	6,938	37.51	5,559	11,103
Washington	74.21	184,091	25.79	63,976	248,067
Wheeler	58.11	455	41.89	328	783
Yamhill	61.33	29,247	38.67	18,438	47,685

Measure 113 was codified as Article IV, Section 15, of the Oregon Constitution, which states: "Failure to attend, without permission or excuse, ten or more legislative floor sessions called to transact business during a regular or special legislative session shall be deemed disorderly behavior and shall disqualify the member from holding office as a Senator or Representative for the term following the election after the member's current term is completed."

== Implementation and legal challenges ==
During the 2023 session, Republicans in the state Senate defied Measure 113 and its supporters by continuing to walk out on sessions, depriving the chamber of a quorum. In early May 2023, a Republican walkout (led by Senate Minority Leader Tim Knopp and Deputy Senate Minority leader Daniel Bonham) far exceeded ten days. By May 18, 2023, nine Republican senators (Knopp, Bonham, Lynn Findley, Bill Hansell, Cedric Ross Hayden, Dennis Linthicum, Art Robinson, Kim Thatcher, and Suzanne Weber), and one Republican-aligned Independent Party senator (Brian Boquist) reached the ten unexcused absence limit set by Measure 113 by refusing to show up and enable votes on bills pertaining to abortion and gun reform in the session. Lasting six weeks, it became the longest walkout in both Oregon history and modern American history. Oregon Republicans formed a new political action committee to raise campaign funds touting their walkout.

On May 8, 2023, Cedric Ross Hayden filed a complaint with the Oregon Bureau of Labor and Industries regarding Measure 113 on the grounds of religious discrimination. He cited that his Seventh-Day Adventist beliefs prevent him from working on Saturdays, and that the refusal of Senate President Rob Wagner to approve his requests for authorized absences (filed on religious grounds) for Saturdays during this walkout was discriminatory against his religion. The investigation of this complaint is projected to conclude by May 2024.

On August 8, 2023, Secretary of State LaVonne Griffin-Valade confirmed she would enforce the measure and prevent the ten legislators from filing for reelection. Five of the Republican Senators, including Knopp and Bonham, filed a lawsuit in response arguing that the measure's wording allowed them to serve one additional term before being barred from reelection, citing that the penalty would only apply after the end of the current legislative term, which would end after the 2024 election and the 2026 election, respectively. Therefore, they argued, the law should have only disqualified them for the 2028 and 2030 elections. Three Senators, including Knopp, filed for reelection in September citing this interpretation of the measure. On October 24, the Oregon Supreme Court agreed to hear the case, and on February 1, 2024, ruled unanimously against the Republican senators.

On December 15, 2023, a federal district court judge rejected a separate legal challenge to block the implementation of Measure 113 under the First and Fourteenth Amendments of the United States Constitution, finding that the measure was working as intended by Oregon voters. The judge cited the 2011 Nevada Commission on Ethics v. Carrigan ruling by the U.S. Supreme Court in dismissing the challenge.

== See also ==
- Quorum-busting
- List of Oregon ballot measures
