= Rob Wagner (politician) =

American politician (born 1973)

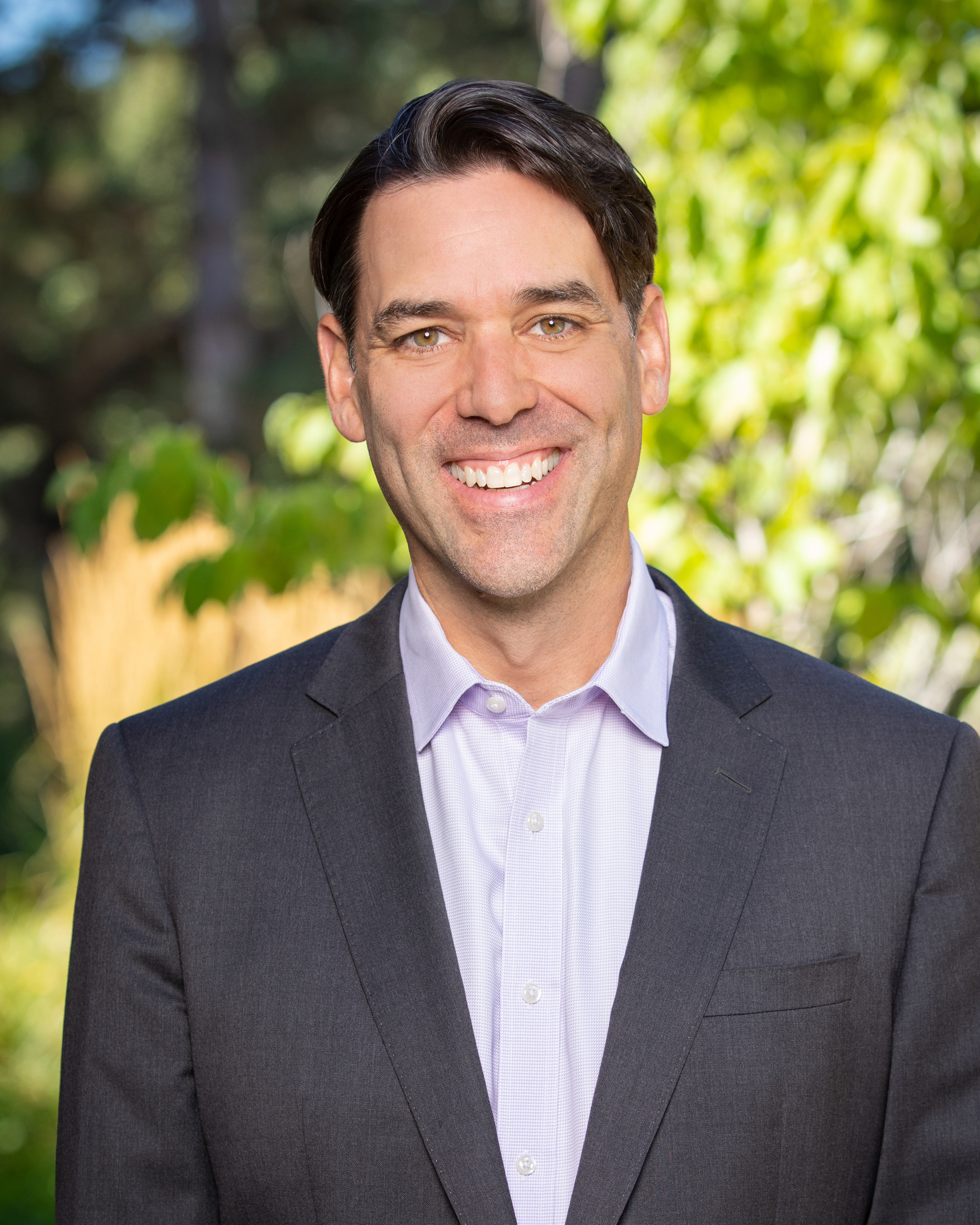
- Wagner in 2022

56th President of the Oregon Senate
- Incumbent
- Assumed office January 9, 2023
- Preceded by: Peter Courtney

Majority Leader of the Oregon Senate
- In office May 22, 2020 – January 9, 2023
- Preceded by: Ginny Burdick
- Succeeded by: Kate Lieber

Member of the Oregon Senate from the 19th district
- Incumbent
- Assumed office January 29, 2018
- Preceded by: Richard Devlin

Personal details
- Born: Robert Arnold Wagner; January 10, 1973 (age 53)
- Party: Democratic
- Spouse: Laurie
- Children: 4
- Education: Wesleyan University (attended); Portland State University (BA); George Washington University (MPP)
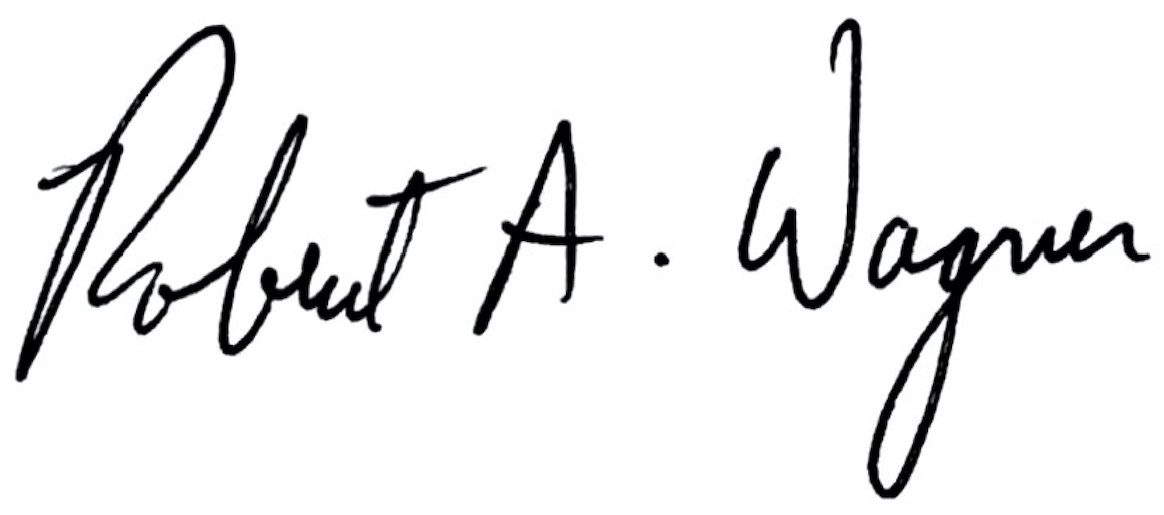
- Signature
- Website: https://www.robwagnerfororegon.com
- Rob Wagner's voice Wagner speaks on a bill in the 80th Oregon Legislative Assembly; Recorded March 6, 2020

Robert Arnold Wagner (born January 10, 1973) is an American Democratic politician currently serving as President of the Oregon State Senate. He represents the 19th district, which includes the cities of Durham, Lake Oswego, Rivergrove, Tualatin, West Linn, parts of southwest Portland and Tigard, as well as unincorporated parts of southwestern Clackamas County, eastern Washington County, and southern Multnomah County.

== Early life and education ==
Wagner grew up in Lake Oswego and graduated from Lake Oswego High School. He studied at Wesleyan University and graduated from Portland State University with a degree in political science. He earned a masters in public policy from George Washington University.

== Career ==
Wagner first worked at the Oregon State Capital in 1997 as an intern.

He served as a director of political and legislative affairs for the American Federation of Teachers and was associate vice-president for advancement at Portland Community College, overseeing the foundation, marketing and public relations.

In December 2017, Wagner announced he left Portland Community College.

=== School Board ===
In May 2017, Wagner ran unopposed and was elected to the Lake Oswego School Board. In July 2019, he was elected by the school board as its chair for a one-year term. In May 2020, he announced that he would resign from the school board on June 22, 2020, citing demands of work required by his new position as the majority leader of the Oregon Senate.

=== State Senate ===
In January 2018, Wagner was appointed to fill the vacancy in District 19 of the Oregon Senate created when Richard Devlin was appointed to the Northwest Power and Conservation Council. Wagner continued his service on the school board while in the Senate.

In the 2018 Oregon legislative election, he defeated Republican David Poulson to earn a full Senate term.

In the Senate, Wagner served as chair of the Senate Education Committee.

Wagner was elected Senate Majority Leader in May 2020.

=== President of the Senate ===
In November 2022, after Democrats retained their majority in that month's election but lost their supermajority, Wagner was nominated by the Senate Democratic caucus to succeed Peter Courtney as Presidents of the Oregon State Senate. Kate Lieber was chosen to replace Wagner as majority leader Wagner took office on January 9, 2023.

==== 2023 walkout ====
On May 2, 2023, Senate Republicans attempted to remove Wagner as president, and on May 3 most Republican senators and one independent began a walkout that denied the Senate a quorum. The boycott stalled hundreds of bills, including measures on gun control, abortion rights, and gender-affirming care. Republicans leaders said the action was a protest over whether bill summaries met legal readability requirements. Wagner called that rationale "meritless" and said the aim was to obstruct votes on the underlying bills.

==== 2025 transportation funding ====
During the 2025 regular session, Wagner removed Democratic Senator Mark Meek from the Transportation Committee after Meek said he would not support the transportation funding bill. In a special session called by Governor Tina Kotek, the Senate passed a scaled-back transportation funding bill, House Bill 3991, on September 29, 2025. It raised the gas tax by six cents and increased vehicle registration fees and a statewide transit payroll tax.

== Personal life ==
Wagner lives with his wife and children in Lake Oswego.

== Electoral history ==
2018 Oregon State Senator, 19th district
| Party | Candidate | Votes | % |
|---|---|---|---|
| Democratic | Rob Wagner | 47,521 | 65.5 |
| Republican | David C Poulson | 24,913 | 34.3 |
| Write-in | | 116 | 0.2 |
| Total votes | | 72,550 | 100% |

2022 Oregon State Senator, 19th district
| Party | Candidate | Votes | % |
|---|---|---|---|
| Democratic | Rob Wagner | 48,309 | 66.0 |
| Republican | Ben Edtl | 24,767 | 33.9 |
| Write-in | | 85 | 0.1 |
| Total votes | | 73,161 | 100% |

Oregon Senate
| Preceded by Ginny Burdick | Majority Leader of the Oregon Senate; 2020–2023 | Succeeded by Kate Lieber |
Political offices
| Preceded by Peter Courtney | President of the Oregon Senate; 2023–present | Incumbent |
