= 80th Oregon Legislative Assembly =

Term of state legislature in Oregon, US

←	79th Legislative Assembly	81st Legislative Assembly	→
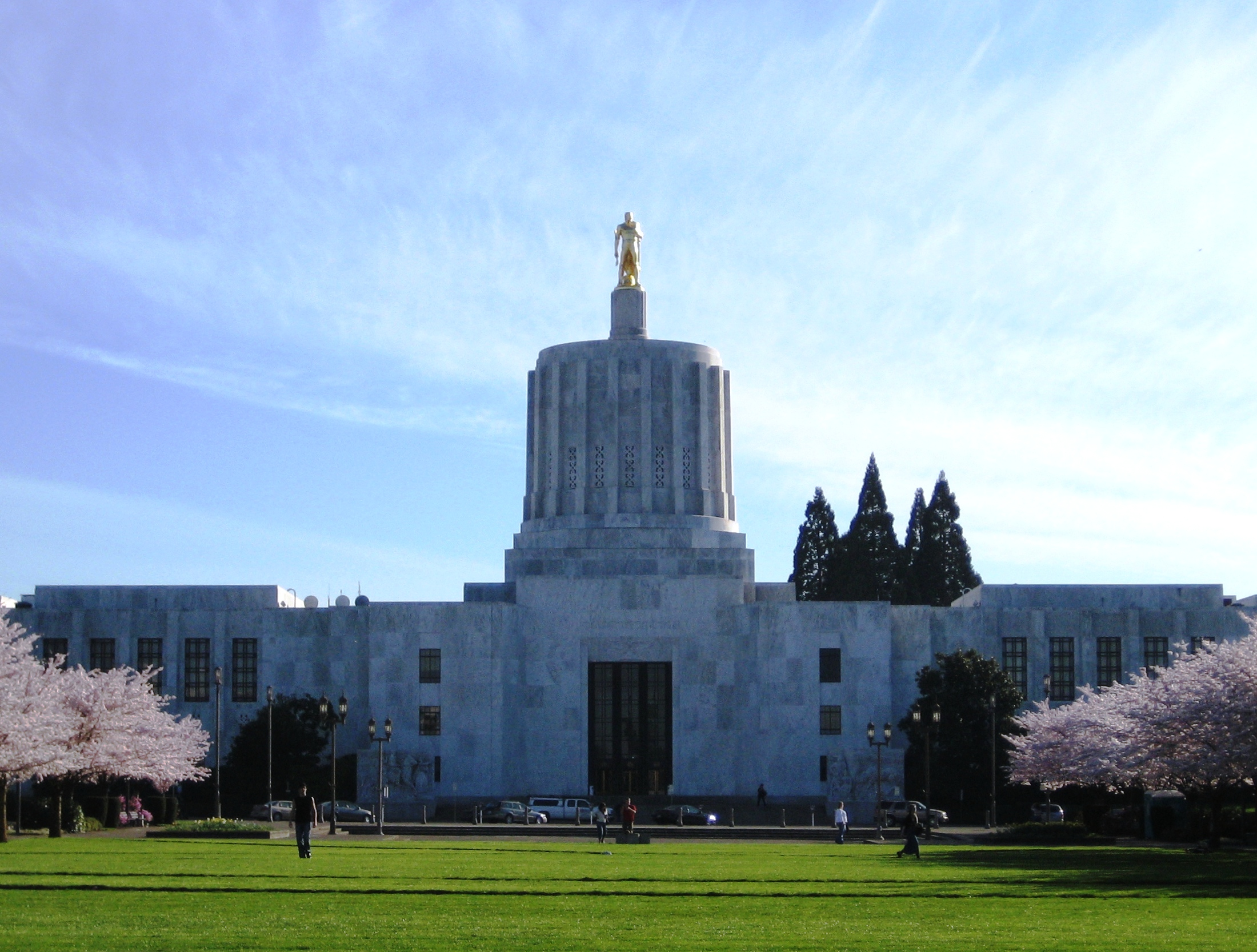
- The legislature took place in the Oregon State Capitol, seen here in 2007

Overview
- Legislative body: Oregon Legislative Assembly
- Jurisdiction: Oregon, United States
- Meeting place: Oregon State Capitol
- Term: 2019–2021
- Website: www.oregonlegislature.gov

Oregon State Senate
- Members: 30 Senators
- Senate President: Peter Courtney (D)
- Majority Leader: Rob Wagner (D)
- Minority Leader: Herman Baertschiger Jr. (R)
- Party control: Democratic

Oregon House of Representatives
- Members: 60 Representatives
- Speaker of the House: Tina Kotek (D)
- Majority Leader: Barbara Smith Warner (D)
- Minority Leader: Christine Drazan (R)
- Party control: Democratic

The 80th Oregon Legislative Assembly convened for its first of two regular sessions on January 22, 2019, and met for three special sessions, the last of which concluded on December 21, 2020.

In the November 2018 elections, the Democratic Party of Oregon gained supermajority status in both houses: one seat in the Senate for an 18–12 majority, and three seats in the House for a 38–22 majority. From May 29 to June 28, 2019, the 10th senate district was vacant, following the death of senate minority leader Jackie Winters.

== Notable legislation ==
=== Successful ===
- HB 2001: Legalizing the upzoning of single-family-zoned neighborhoods to duplexes in cities above 10,000 in population, and legalizing the building of larger multi-family houses in cities above 25,000, including the Portland metropolitan area.
- SB 861: Approving state-funded postage for mail-in ballots
- HB 2007: Requiring a phase-out of all pre-2007 model year diesel trucks from Portland roads by 2025
- HB 2005: family/sick leave bill
- HB 2015: allowing drivers licenses for undocumented immigrants
- SB 1013: narrowing the number of death penalty offenses
- SB 998: Legalizing the Idaho stop for bicyclists
- SB 870: National Popular Vote Interstate Compact
- HB 3216: Allowing lawsuits for racially motivated frivolous 9-1-1 calls
- SB 420: Expanding expungements of non-violent marijuana-related offenses
- SB 577: Adding gender identity as a protected class in hate crimes
- SB 320: Keeping most of Oregon on Daylight Saving Time on a year-round basis (the part of Oregon in the Mountain Time Zone is exempt)
- SB 90: Placing restrictions on the distribution of plastic straws by restaurants and other food establishments

=== Sent to referendum ===
- HB 2270: Raising the tobacco tax to fund healthcare
- SJR 18: Constitutional amendment to define campaign finance limits

=== Unsuccessful ===
- HB 2020: Cap-and-trade
- HB 3063: Removal of religious objections to mandatory vaccines
- HJR 10: Constitutional amendment for abolition of non-unanimous juries for criminal felony cases

== Senate ==
The Oregon State Senate is composed of 18 Democrats and 12 Republicans. Democrats gained one seat in District 3.

Senate President: Peter Courtney (D–11 Salem)
President Pro Tempore: Laurie Monnes Anderson (D–25 Gresham)
Majority Leader: Ginny Burdick (D–18 Portland) until May 22, 2020; Rob Wagner (D-19 Lake Oswego) after
Minority Leader: Herman Baertschiger Jr. (R-2 Grants Pass)

District	Senator	Party	Residence	Assumed office
1	Dallas Heard	Republican	Roseburg	2018 (Note: Senator was originally appointed.)
2	Herman Baertschiger Jr.	Republican	Grants Pass	2013
3	Jeff Golden	Democratic	Ashland	2019
4	Floyd Prozanski	Democratic	Eugene	2003
5	Arnie Roblan	Democratic	Coos Bay	2013
6	Lee Beyer	Democratic	Springfield	2011
7	James Manning Jr.	Democratic	Eugene	2017
8	Sara Gelser	Democratic	Corvallis	2015
9	Fred Girod	Republican	Molalla	2008
10	Jackie Winters (Note: Winters died on May 29, 2019.)	Republican	Salem	2003
10	Denyc Boles (Note: Boles was appointed as Winters' successor on June 25, 2019, and was sworn into office on June 28, 2019.)	Republican	Salem	2019
11	Peter Courtney	Democratic	Salem	1999
12	Brian Boquist	Republican	Dallas	2009
13	Kim Thatcher	Republican	Keizer	2015
14	Mark Hass	Democratic	Beaverton	2007
15	Chuck Riley	Democratic	Hillsboro	2015
16	Betsy Johnson	Democratic	Scappoose	2007
17	Elizabeth Steiner Hayward	Democratic	Portland	2012
18	Ginny Burdick	Democratic	Portland	1997
19	Rob Wagner	Democratic	Lake Oswego	2018
20	Alan Olsen	Republican	Canby	2011
21	Kathleen Taylor	Democratic	Portland	2017
22	Lew Frederick	Democratic	Portland	2017
23	Michael Dembrow	Democratic	Portland	2013
24	Shemia Fagan	Democratic	Clackamas	2019
25	Laurie Monnes Anderson	Democratic	Gresham	2005
26	Chuck Thomsen	Republican	Hood River	2010
27	Tim Knopp	Republican	Bend	2013
28	Dennis Linthicum	Republican	Bonanza	2017
29	Bill Hansell	Republican	Pendleton	2013
30	Cliff Bentz (Note: Bentz resigned from office effective January 2, 2020 to run in the 2020 election representing Oregon's 2nd congressional district in the United States House of Representatives.)	Republican	Ontario	2018
30	Lynn Findley (Note: Findley was appointed as Bentz's successor on January 6, 2020.)	Republican	Vale	2020

=== Events ===
In May 2019, Republican state senators refused to attend senate sessions for four days, opposing a $2 billion tax package for K-12 schools. They only returned after making a deal with Oregon Governor Kate Brown that Democratic state senators would not field bills on guns and vaccines, would "reset" a cap-and-trade bill, and promised not to walk out again. Previous Oregon legislative walkouts have occurred in 2007 for Republicans and 2001, 1995 and 1971 for Democrats.

From June 20, 2019, all 11 Republican state senators for Oregon, including Girod, refused to show up for work at the Oregon State Capitol, instead going into hiding, some even fleeing the state. Their aim was to prevent a vote on a cap-and-trade proposal, House Bill 2020 that would dramatically lower greenhouse gas emissions by 2050 to combat climate change. The Senate holds 30 seats, but 1 is vacant due to the death of Republican Jackie Winters. Without the Republican senators, the remaining 18 Democratic state senators could not reach a quorum of 20 to hold a vote before the end of the legislative session on June 30, 2019. This tactic is known as quorum-busting.

Oregon Governor Kate Brown sent the Oregon State Police to bring the absent Republican senators back to the Capitol. In response, Republican Oregon Senator Brian Boquist said: "Send bachelors and come heavily armed. I'm not going to be a political prisoner in the state of Oregon." Right-wing militia groups have offered support for the Republican senators, with 3 Percenters declaring they would be "doing whatever it takes to keep these senators safe", and the Oath Keepers stating: "Gov. Brown, you want a civil war, because this is how you get a civil war". On June 22, 2019, a session of the Oregon Senate was cancelled when the Oregon State Capitol was closed due to a warning from the state police of a "possible militia threat". All but 2 of the Republican senators returned to the session by June 29.

In August 2019 Governor Brown considered calling a special session to address the impacts of recent death penalty legislation, but declined to do so when it became clear that the House of Representatives lacked the votes to ensure passage.

In February 2020 Republican senators walked out again, still in protest of the cap and trade legislation.

== House ==
Based on the results of the 2018 elections, the Oregon House of Representatives is composed of 38 Democrats and 22 Republicans. Democrats gained three seats from the previous session.

Speaker: Tina Kotek (D–44 Portland)
Speaker Pro Tempore: Paul Holvey (D-8 Eugene)
Majority Leader: Jennifer Williamson (D–36 Portland) until July 7, 2019; Barbara Smith Warner (D-45 Portland) after
Minority Leader: Carl Wilson (R–3 Grants Pass) until September 16, 2019; Christine Drazan (R-39 Canby) after

District	Representative	Party	Residence	Assumed office
1	David Brock Smith	Republican	Port Orford	2017
2	Gary Leif	Republican	Roseburg	2018 (Note: Representative was originally appointed.)
3	Carl Wilson	Republican	Grants Pass	2015
4	Duane Stark	Republican	Grants Pass	2015
5	Pam Marsh	Democratic	Ashland	2017
6	Kim Wallan	Republican	Medford	2019
7	Cedric Ross Hayden	Republican	Fall Creek	2015
8	Paul Holvey	Democratic	Eugene	2004
9	Caddy McKeown	Democratic	Coos Bay	2013
10	David Gomberg	Democratic	Otis	2013
11	Marty Wilde	Democratic	Eugene	2019
12	John Lively	Democratic	Springfield	2013
13	Nancy Nathanson	Democratic	Eugene	2007
14	Julie Fahey	Democratic	Eugene	2017
15	Shelly Boshart Davis	Republican	Albany	2019
16	Dan Rayfield	Democratic	Corvallis	2015
17	Sherrie Sprenger	Republican	Scio	2009
18	Rick Lewis	Republican	Silverton	2017
19	Denyc Boles (Note: Boles was appointed on June 25, 2019 to replace Jackie Winters as the Senator for District 10 in the Oregon State Senate. Winters died on May 29, 2019, leaving the seat vacant.)	Republican	Salem	2014
19	Raquel Moore-Green (Note: Moore-Green was appointed on July 23, 2019 to replace Boles.)	Republican	Salem	2019
20	Paul Evans	Democratic	Monmouth	2015
21	Brian L. Clem	Democratic	Salem	2007
22	Teresa Alonso Leon	Democratic	Woodburn	2017
23	Mike Nearman	Republican	Independence	2015
24	Ron Noble	Republican	McMinnville	2017
25	Bill Post	Republican	Keizer	2015
26	Courtney Neron Misslin	Democratic	Wilsonville	2019
27	Sheri Malstrom	Democratic	Beaverton	2017
28	Jeff Barker	Democratic	Aloha	2003
29	Susan McLain	Democratic	Forest Grove	2015
30	Janeen Sollman	Democratic	Hillsboro	2017
31	Brad Witt	Democratic	Clatskanie	2005
32	Tiffiny Mitchell	Democratic	Astoria	2019
33	Mitch Greenlick (Note: Greenlick died on May 15, 2020.)	Democratic	Portland	2003
33	Maxine Dexter (Note: Dexter was appointed on June 14, 2020 to replace Williamson.)	Democratic	Portland	2020
34	Ken Helm	Democratic	Beaverton	2015
35	Margaret Doherty	Democratic	Tigard	2009
36	Jennifer Williamson (Note: Williamson resigned from office effective December 30, 2019 to run for Oregon Secretary of State.)	Democratic	Portland	2013
36	Akasha Lawrence-Spence (Note: Lawrence-Spence was appointed on January 16, 2020 to replace Williamson.)	Democratic	Portland	2020
37	Rachel Prusak	Democratic	West Linn	2019
38	Andrea Salinas	Democratic	Lake Oswego	2017
39	Christine Drazan	Republican	Canby	2019
40	Mark Meek	Democratic	Gladstone	2017
41	Karin Power	Democratic	Milwaukie	2017
42	Rob Nosse	Democratic	Portland	2014
43	Tawna Sanchez	Democratic	Portland	2017
44	Tina Kotek	Democratic	Portland	2007
45	Barbara Smith Warner	Democratic	Portland	2015
46	Alissa Keny-Guyer	Democratic	Portland	2011
47	Diego Hernandez	Democratic	Portland	2017
48	Jeff Reardon	Democratic	Happy Valley	2013
49	Chris Gorsek	Democratic	Troutdale	2013
50	Carla Piluso	Democratic	Gresham	2015
51	Janelle Bynum	Democratic	Happy Valley	2017
52	Anna Williams	Democratic	Hood River	2019
53	Jack Zika	Republican	Redmond	2019
54	Cheri Helt	Republican	Bend	2019
55	Mike McLane (Note: McLane resigned from office effective July 1, 2019 to accept an appointment from Governor Kate Brown to the Oregon circuit court bench as a judge representing the 22nd judicial district.)	Republican	Powell Butte	2011
55	Vikki Breese-Iverson (Note: Breese-Iverson was appointed on August 8, 2019 to replace McLane.)	Republican	Prineville	2019
56	E. Werner Reschke	Republican	Klamath Falls	2017
57	Greg Smith	Republican	Heppner	2001
58	Greg Barreto	Republican	Cove	2015
59	Daniel Bonham	Republican	The Dalles	2017
60	Lynn Findley (Note: Findley resigned from office effective January 6, 2020 to accept an appointment to the Oregon Senate representing District 30.)	Republican	Vale	2018
60	Mark Owens (Note: Owens was appointed on January 21, 2020 to replace Findley.)	Republican	Crane	2020

== See also ==
- 2018 Oregon legislative election
