= 81st Oregon Legislative Assembly =

←	80th Legislative Assembly	82nd Legislative Assembly	→
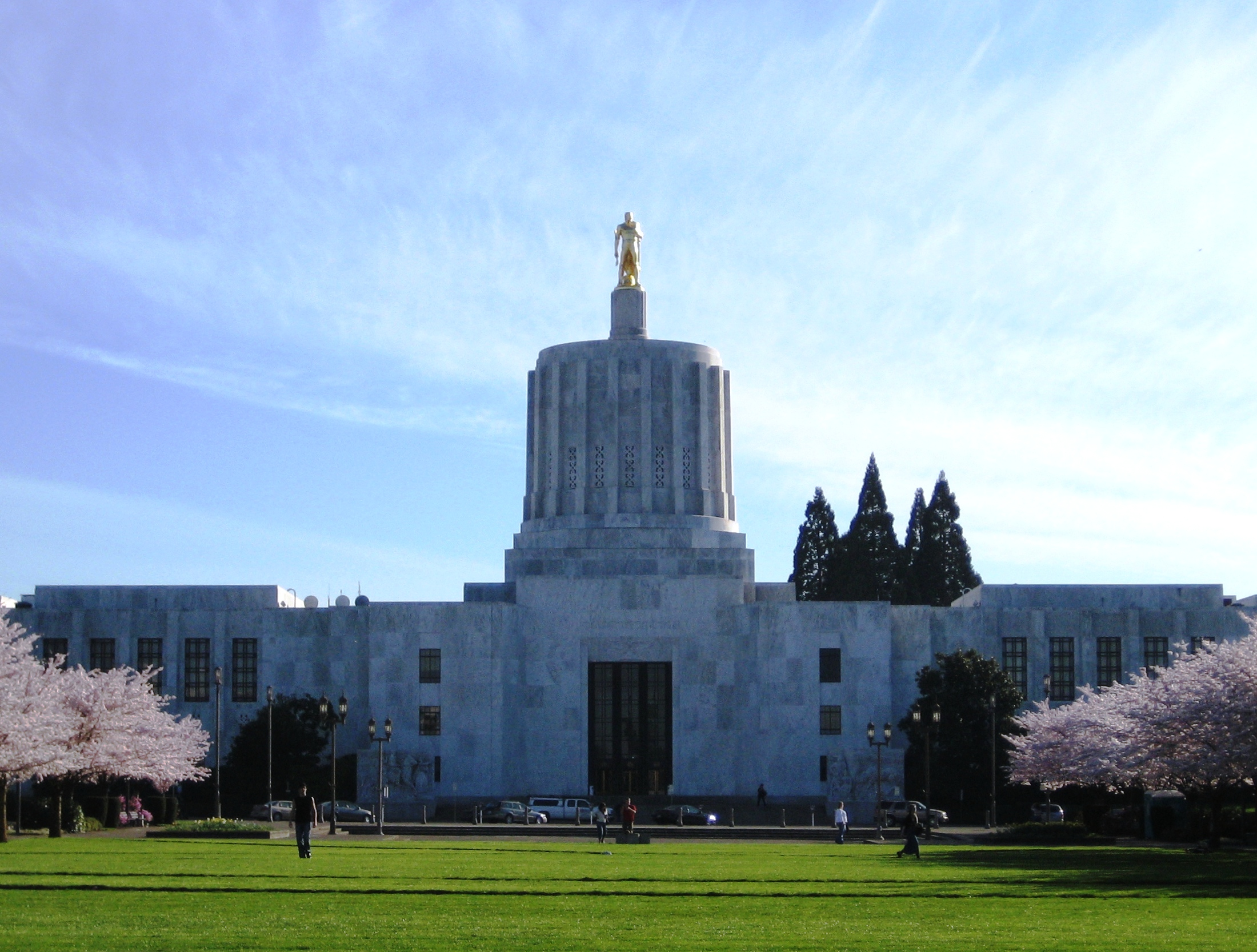
- The legislature took place in the Oregon State Capitol, seen here in 2007

Overview
- Legislative body: Oregon Legislative Assembly
- Jurisdiction: Oregon, United States
- Meeting place: Oregon State Capitol
- Term: 2021–2023
- Website: www.oregonlegislature.gov

Oregon State Senate
- Members: 30 Senators
- Senate President: Peter Courtney (D)
- Majority Leader: Rob Wagner (D)
- Minority Leader: Tim Knopp (R)
- Party control: Democratic

Oregon House of Representatives
- Members: 60 Representatives
- Speaker of the House: Dan Rayfield (D)
- Majority Leader: Julie Fahey (D)
- Minority Leader: Vikki Breese-Iverson (R)
- Party control: Democratic

The 81st Oregon Legislative Assembly was the legislative session of the Oregon Legislative Assembly that convened on January 11, 2021 and adjourned June 26th. Its even-year short session of 35 days convened on February 1, 2022 and adjourned sine die on March 4, 2022.

The Democratic Party of Oregon retained supermajority status in both chambers: as a result of the 2020 Oregon State Senate election, the Democrats kept its 18–12 majority, and in the 2020 Oregon House of Representatives election, the party's majority slipped by a single seat to maintain a 37–23 majority.

== Legislation ==
During the 35 day short session that began February 1, 2022, lawmakers considered more than 250 bills and allocating between $1.5 and $2 billion in funding.

=== Successful ===
SCR 203 "Adjourns sine die 2022 regular session of Eighty-first Legislative Assembly."

SCR 204 "Establishes deadlines for presession-filed legislative measures for 2023 regular session of Eighty-second Legislative Assembly."

5703A SB 5703A "Modifies amounts allocated from Administrative Services Economic Development Fund to state agencies."

SB 5702A "Establishes and modifies limits on payment of expenses from specified funds by certain state agencies for capital construction."

SB 5701 "Modifies projects and amounts authorized for issuance of general obligation bonds, revenue bonds, certificates of participation and other financing agreements for biennium."

HB 1584 "Creates procedure for filing petition for compensation for wrongful conviction."

HB 1567B(50-7) "Requires owners or operators of bulk oils and liquid fuels terminals located in Columbia, Multnomah or Lane County to conduct and submit to Department of Environmental Quality seismic vulnerability assessments."

HB 1560 "Updates statutory references to individual who is not citizen or national of United States to replace 'alien' with 'noncitizen.' Directs state agencies to use 'noncitizen' in rules and regulations to reference individual who is not citizen or national of United States and to update rules and regulations that use 'alien' to use 'noncitizen.' Authorizes agencies to amend rule without prior notice or hearing for purpose of changing term or phrase in order to conform with change made by law."

HB 1556B "Requires Department of Human Services to establish certification process for direct care providers of home or community-based services and implement online registry of direct care providers of home or community-based services."

HB 1547 "Requires operators, employees and certain volunteers of preschool recorded programs and school-age recorded programs to be enrolled in Central Background Registry."

HB 4156 "Provides that Broadband Fund may include moneys appropriated or transferred to fund."

SB 1536 "Limits restrictions on portable cooling devices in residences by landlords, homeowners associations, condominium associations and local governments."

SB 1520 "Requires certain distributors that do not participate in distributor cooperative to provide services for processing and paying refund value for beverage containers."

SB 1504 "Provides that Multi-Jurisdictional Simulcasting and Interactive Wagering Totalizator Hub licensee may establish account for wagering on greyhound racing for individual unless wagering on live greyhound racing is unlawful in jurisdiction of individual's principal residence."

SB 1501 "Directs State Board of Forestry to adopt single rule package on or before November 30, 2022, to implement Private Forest Accord Report."

SB 1510 (34-24, 3/3/2022) "Requires police officer to inform stopped person of right to refuse consent to search."

SB 1545 "Establishes grant programs in Higher Education Coordinating Commission to provide funding for workforce development activities that aim to increase access for priority populations to training opportunities in technology, health care and manufacturing and to workforce development services and benefits."

SB 1538 "Establishes COFA Dental Program in Oregon Health Authority to provide dental care to low-income citizens of Pacific Islands in Compact of Free Association who reside in Oregon."

SB 1522 "Authorizes high school teachers who are employed by education service districts to serve as members of Transfer Council."

SB 1519 "Grants property tax exemption for proportion of community solar project that is owned by residential customers or leased by residential subscribers."

SB 1579 (40-19, 3/3/2022) "Directs Oregon Business Development Department to develop and implement Economic Equity Investment Program to award grants to organizations that provide culturally responsive services to support economic stability, self-sufficiency, wealth building and economic equity among disadvantaged individuals, families, businesses and communities in Oregon."

— Bill descriptions are taken from OregonLegislature.gov — Current Session Bills

== Senate ==
Map of the current composition of the Oregon Senate by district

The Oregon State Senate is composed of 18 Democrats, 11 Republicans, and one Independent.

Senate President: Peter Courtney (D–11 Salem)
President Pro Tempore: James Manning Jr. (D–7 Eugene)
Majority Leader: Rob Wagner (D-19 Lake Oswego)
Minority Leader: Fred Girod (R-9 Stayton) until October 22, 2021; Tim Knopp (R-27 Bend)

District	Senator	Party	Residence	Assumed office
1	Dallas Heard	Republican	Roseburg	2018
2	Art Robinson	Republican	Cave Junction	2021
3	Jeff Golden	Democratic	Ashland	2019
4	Floyd Prozanski	Democratic	Eugene	2003
5	Dick Anderson	Republican	Lincoln City	2021
6	Lee Beyer	Democratic	Springfield	2011
7	James Manning Jr.	Democratic	Eugene	2017
8	Sara Gelser	Democratic	Corvallis	2015
9	Fred Girod	Republican	Stayton	2008
10	Deb Patterson	Democratic	Salem	2021
11	Peter Courtney	Democratic	Salem	1999
12	Brian Boquist	Independent (Note: Boquist left the Republican caucus and the Republican Party on January 15, 2021. He subsequently registered with the Independent Party of Oregon.)	Dallas	2009
13	Kim Thatcher	Republican	Keizer	2015
14	Kate Lieber	Democratic	Beaverton	2021
15	Chuck Riley	Democratic	Hillsboro	2015
15	Janeen Sollman	Democratic	Hillsboro	2022
16	Betsy Johnson	Democratic	Scappoose	2007
16	Rachel Armitage	Democratic	Warren	2022
17	Elizabeth Steiner Hayward	Democratic	Portland	2012
18	Ginny Burdick	Democratic	Portland	1997
18	Akasha Lawrence-Spence	Democratic	Portland	2021
19	Rob Wagner	Democratic	Lake Oswego	2018
20	Alan Olsen	Republican	Canby	2011
20	Bill Kennemer	Republican	Canby	2021
21	Kathleen Taylor	Democratic	Portland	2017
22	Lew Frederick	Democratic	Portland	2017
23	Michael Dembrow	Democratic	Portland	2013
24	Kayse Jama	Democratic	Portland	2021
25	Chris Gorsek	Democratic	Troutdale	2021
26	Chuck Thomsen	Republican	Hood River	2010
27	Tim Knopp	Republican	Bend	2013
28	Dennis Linthicum	Republican	Klamath Falls	2017
29	Bill Hansell	Republican	Athena	2013
30	Lynn Findley	Republican	Vale	2020

=== Events ===
In January 2021, Senator Alan Olsen abruptly announced his resignation from office. He told his colleagues it was a “very difficult decision to make,” but his “family always comes first". The Clackamas and Marion County commissioners appointed former Clackamas County Commissioner and Oregon State Representative Bill Kennemer to succeed Sen. Olsen.

In October 2021, Senator Fred Girod (R) announced that we was immediately resigning his position as the Senate minority leader due to unspecified health concerns. Senator Tim Knopp (R) replaced him in this role as of October 22, 2021.

In November 2021, Senator Ginny Burdick (D) was appointed by Governor Kate Brown to the Pacific Northwest Electric Power and Conservation Planning Council. The Washington County commissioners appointed former Representative Akasha Lawrence-Spence to serve the remaining term of Sen. Burdick.

In December 2021, Senator Betsy Johnson resigned from her seat to focus all her attention on her independent run for governor and ensure her constituents had someone fully dedicated to representing them. In her resignation, Senator Johnson requested that the county commissioners appoint a someone who would not run again for the seat. The commissioners from Clatsop, Columbia, Multnomah, Tillamook, Washington, and Yamhill counties appointed Rachel Armitage.

== House ==
Map of the current composition of the Oregon House of Representatives by district

Based on the results of the 2020 elections, the Oregon House of Representatives is composed of 37 Democrats and 23 Republicans. Republicans gained one seat from the previous session.

Speaker: Tina Kotek (D–44 Portland) until January 21, 2022; Dan Rayfield (D-16 Corvallis)

Representative Paul Holvey served as acting Speaker of the House from January 21, 2022 to February 1, 2022.

Speaker Pro Tempore: Paul Holvey (D-8 Eugene)
Majority Leader: Barbara Smith Warner (D-45 Portland) until January 16, 2022; Julie Fahey (D-14 Eugene)
Minority Leader: Christine Drazan (R-39 Canby) until November 30, 2021; Vikki Breese-Iverson (R-55 Prineville)

District	Representative	Party	Residence	Assumed office
1	David Brock Smith	Republican	Port Orford	2017
2	Gary Leif	Republican	Roseburg	2018
2	Christine Goodwin	Republican	Roseburg	2021
3	Lily Morgan	Republican	Grants Pass	2021
4	Duane Stark	Republican	Grants Pass	2015
5	Pam Marsh	Democratic	Ashland	2017
6	Kim Wallan	Republican	Medford	2019
7	Cedric Ross Hayden	Republican	Fall Creek	2015
8	Paul Holvey	Democratic	Eugene	2004
9	Boomer Wright	Republican	Coos Bay	2021
10	David Gomberg	Democratic	Otis	2013
11	Marty Wilde	Democratic	Eugene	2019
12	John Lively	Democratic	Springfield	2013
13	Nancy Nathanson	Democratic	Eugene	2007
14	Julie Fahey	Democratic	Eugene	2017
15	Shelly Boshart Davis	Republican	Albany	2019
16	Dan Rayfield	Democratic	Corvallis	2015
17	Jami Cate	Republican	Lebanon	2021
18	Rick Lewis	Republican	Silverton	2017
19	Raquel Moore-Green	Republican	Salem	2019
20	Paul Evans	Democratic	Monmouth	2015
21	Brian L. Clem	Democratic	Salem	2007
21	Chris Hoy	Democratic	Salem	2021
22	Teresa Alonso Leon	Democratic	Woodburn	2017
23	Mike Nearman	Republican	Independence	2015
23	Anna Scharf	Republican	Amity	2021
24	Ron Noble	Republican	McMinnville	2017
25	Bill Post	Republican	Keizer	2015
25	Jessica George	Republican	Keizer	2021
26	Courtney Neron Misslin	Democratic	Wilsonville	2019
27	Sheri Schouten	Democratic	Beaverton	2017
28	Wlnsvey Campos	Democratic	Aloha	2021
29	Susan McLain	Democratic	Forest Grove	2015
30	Janeen Sollman	Democratic	Hillsboro	2017
30	Nathan Sosa	Democratic	Hillsboro	2022
31	Brad Witt	Democratic	Clatskanie	2005
32	Suzanne Weber	Republican	Tillamook	2021
33	Maxine Dexter	Democratic	Portland	2020
34	Ken Helm	Democratic	Beaverton	2015
35	Dacia Grayber	Democratic	Tigard	2021
36	Lisa Reynolds	Democratic	Portland	2021
37	Rachel Prusak	Democratic	West Linn	2019
38	Andrea Salinas	Democratic	Lake Oswego	2017
39	Christine Drazan	Republican	Canby	2019
39	James Hieb	Republican	Canby	2022
40	Mark Meek	Democratic	Gladstone	2017
41	Karin Power	Democratic	Milwaukie	2017
42	Rob Nosse	Democratic	Portland	2014
43	Tawna Sanchez	Democratic	Portland	2017
44	Tina Kotek	Democratic	Portland	2007
44	Travis Nelson	Democratic	Portland	2022
45	Barbara Smith Warner	Democratic	Portland	2015
46	Khanh Pham	Democratic	Portland	2021
47	Diego Hernandez	Democratic	Portland	2017
47	Andrea Valderrama	Democratic	Portland	2021
48	Jeff Reardon	Democratic	Happy Valley	2013
49	Zach Hudson	Democratic	Troutdale	2021
50	Ricki Ruiz	Democratic	Gresham	2021
51	Janelle Bynum	Democratic	Happy Valley	2017
52	Anna Williams	Democratic	Hood River	2019
53	Jack Zika	Republican	Redmond	2019
54	Jason Kropf	Democratic	Bend	2021
55	Vikki Breese-Iverson	Republican	Prineville	2019
56	E. Werner Reschke	Republican	Klamath Falls	2017
57	Greg Smith	Republican	Heppner	2001
58	Bobby Levy	Republican	Echo	2021
59	Daniel Bonham	Republican	The Dalles	2017
60	Mark Owens	Republican	Crane	2020

== See also ==
- 2020 Oregon State Senate election
- 2020 Oregon House of Representatives election
