= Billy Dalto =

American politician (born 1976)

Member of the Oregon House of Representatives from the 21st district
- In office January 13, 2003 – January 8, 2007
- Preceded by: Randy Leonard (redistricting)
- Succeeded by: Brian Clem

Personal details
- Born: October 21, 1976 (age 49) New York City, New York
- Party: Republican
- Education: Willamette University (BA), Willamette University College of Law (JD)

Luis Guillermo "Billy" Dalto (born October 21, 1976) is an American politician. A Republican, he represented parts of Salem in the Oregon House of Representatives from 2003 until 2007.

== Early life ==
Dalto was born in 1976 in New York City, to Jorge Dalto, a pianist originally from Roque Pérez, Argentina, and Adela Dalto, a singer born to Mexican parents in Texas. His father died of cancer when Dalto was eleven years old.

Dalto graduated from Willamette University in 1998 and Willamette University College of Law in 2012.

== Political career ==
Dalto served as a legislative aide for State Representative Jackie Winters. When Winters ran for the state Senate in 2002, Dalto ran for the state House. He defeated former Salem mayor Mike Swaim, 53% to 47%. He won reelection in 2004, defeating Claudia L. Howells, but lost to Brian Clem by a wide margin in 2006, in a year which saw control of the House of Representatives flip from Republican to Democratic.

Dalto endorsed John Kasich in the 2016 Republican Party presidential primaries.

== Political positions ==
Dalto sponsored a bill in 2003 which would have allowed undocumented immigrants to pay in-state tuition rates at Oregon universities.

According to a 2004 voter guide published by the Oregon Family Council, a Christian conservative organization, Dalto supports legal abortion but favors mandatory parental notification before a minor gets an abortion. As of 2004, he opposed same-sex marriage and increased protections for members of the LGBT community.

Dalto answered Vote Smart's 2006 Political Courage Test, in which he indicated support for a balanced budget and opposition to term limits for state legislators.

== Electoral history ==
2004 Oregon State Representative, 21st district
Party	Candidate	Votes	%
Republican	Billy Dalto	11,213	51.6
Democratic	Claudia L. Howells	10,388	47.8
Write-in		117	0.5
Total votes		21,718	100%

2006 Oregon State Representative, 21st district
Party	Candidate	Votes	%
Democratic	Brian L. Clem	9,598	61.0
Republican	Billy Dalto	6,025	38.3
Write-in		101	0.6
Total votes		15,724	100%
