= Andrea Valderrama =

American politician

Majority Whip of the Oregon House of Representatives
- Incumbent
- Assumed office November 20, 2024
- Preceded by: Julie Fahey

Deputy Majority Whip of the Oregon House of Representatives
- In office January 16, 2022 – November 20, 2024
- Preceded by: Julie Fahey
- Succeeded by: Jason Kropf

Member of the Oregon House of Representatives from the 47th District
- Incumbent
- Assumed office March 23, 2021
- Preceded by: Diego Hernandez

Member of the David Douglas School District Board of Education, Position 6
- In office June 30, 2017 – 2022
- Preceded by: Shannon Raybold
- Succeeded by: Heather Franklin

Personal details
- Party: Democratic
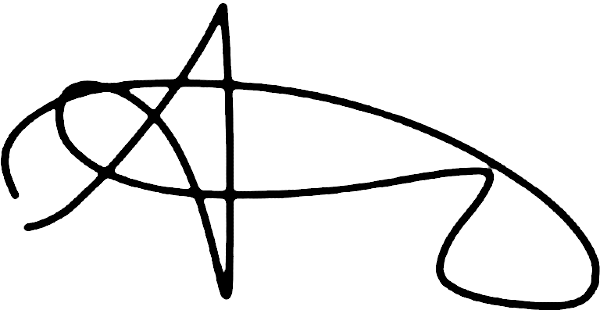
- Signature

Andrea Valderrama is a Peruvian–American politician, currently serving in the Oregon House of Representatives. A member of the Democratic Party, she represents district 47, which includes part of East Portland.

== Early life and education ==
Valderrama graduated from Willamette High School in 2007. She attended the University of Oregon where she earned a bachelor's degree in political science and romance languages in 2011. She earned a master's degree in public administration from Portland State University in 2018.

== Career ==
Valderrama worked for the City of Portland as an outreach and policy advisor from 2013 to 2019, and since 2020, has served as policy director for the American Civil Liberties Union of Oregon.

From 2017 to 2022, Valderrama served on the David Douglas School Board in Position 6, serving as Chair for part of her tenure.

Valderrama ran for Portland City Council in the 2018 election. She came in fourth out of six candidates, with Jo Ann Hardesty winning the seat.

=== Oregon House of Representatives ===
In 2020, State Representative Diego Hernandez was accused of sexual harassment by multiple women. Facing the possibility of being the first legislator ever expelled from the Oregon House, Hernandez announced his resignation on February 22, 2021, which took effect on March 15, 2021. The Multnomah County Commission appointed Valderrama to the seat. Upon her appointment, women held a majority in the Oregon House of Representatives for the first time.

Valderrama won for re-election in 2022 and 2024.

On January 16, 2022, Valderrama was chosen as the Deputy Majority Whip in the House, and on November 20, 2024, she was selected as Majority Whip.

== Electoral history ==
2024 Oregon State Representative, 47th district
Party	Candidate	Votes	%
Democratic	Andrea Valderrama	16,754	95.5
Write-in		784	4.5
Total votes		17,538	100%

2022 Oregon State Representative, 47th district
Party	Candidate	Votes	%
Democratic	Andrea Valderrama	15,136	68.6
Republican	Bill Stewart	6,894	31.2
Write-in		46	0.2
Total votes		22,076	100%

2018 Portland City Commission primary election
Party	Candidate	Votes	%
Nonpartisan	Jo Ann Hardesty	56,235	46.35%
Nonpartisan	Loretta Smith	25,645	21.14%
Nonpartisan	Felecia Williams	13,162	10.85%
Nonpartisan	Andrea Valderrama	12,677	10.45%
Nonpartisan	Stuart Emmons	11,371	9.37%
Nonpartisan	Lew Humble	1,938	1.60%
Write-in		311	0.26%
Total votes		121,339	100.00%

2021 David Douglas School Board election
Party	Candidate	Votes	%
Nonpartisan	Andrea Valderamma	4,452	95.99%
Write-in		186	4.01%
Total votes		4,638	100.00%

2017 David Douglas School Board election
Party	Candidate	Votes	%
Nonpartisan	Andrea Valderamma	4,460	94.67%
Write-in		251	5.33%
Total votes		4,711	100.00%
