= Parkrose High School =

Public school in Portland, Oregon, United States

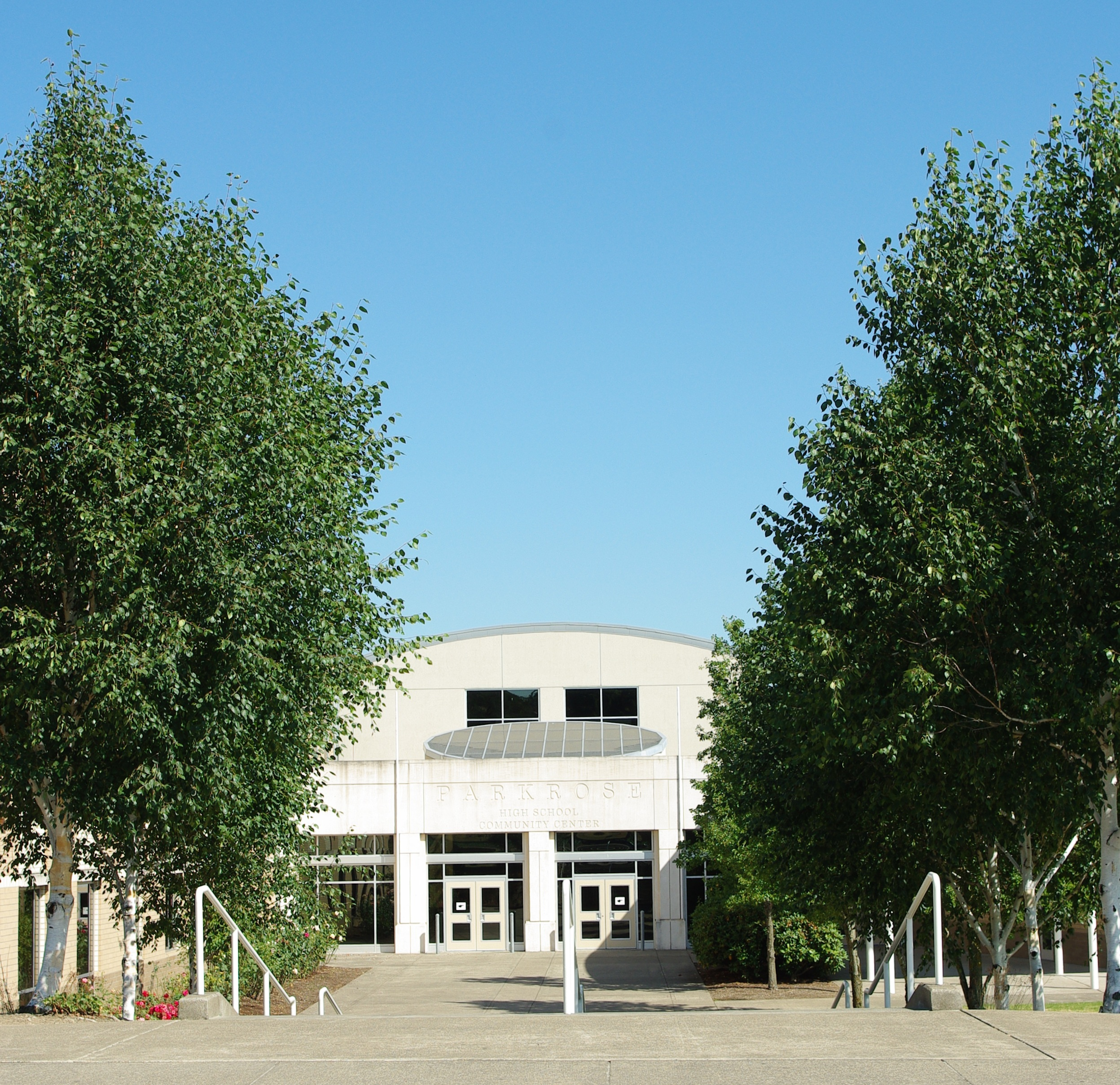

Location
- 12003 NE Shaver Street; Portland, (Multnomah County), Oregon 97220; United States; 45.552672°N 122.540152°W

Information
- Type: Public
- Opened: 1913
- School district: Parkrose School District
- Principal: Molly Ouche
- Teaching staff: 41.25 (FTE)
- Grades: 9-12
- Enrollment: 1,011 (2023-2024)
- Student to teacher ratio: 24.51
- Colors: Black, green, and white
- Athletics conference: OSAA Northwest Oregon Conference 5A-1
- Mascot: Bronco
- Team name: Broncos
- Rival: Centennial High School
- Newspaper: The Bronco Blaze
- Feeder schools: Parkrose Middle School
- Website: hs.parkrose.k12.or.us

Parkrose High School (PHS) is a public high school in Portland, Oregon, United States. It is the only high school in the Parkrose School District.

== Academics ==
In 2008, 72% of the school's seniors received a high school diploma. Of 231 students, 167 graduated, 27 dropped out, ten received a modified diploma, and 27 were still in high school the following year. These numbers have gotten slightly better (and higher than the state average), with, in 2014, a 78% on-time graduation rate for seniors and 34 dropping out.

== Notable events ==
On May 17, 2019, 18 year old Angel Granados Dias entered his Parkrose High School classroom wearing a black trench coat and carrying a loaded shotgun while suffering from a mental health crisis. He was subdued by the school's security guard and sports coach, former Oregon Ducks football team star wide receiver Keanon Lowe. Lowe had previously been searching for Dias after the school received information on a possible threat. It was discovered that the shotgun was only loaded with one round on which Dias had written "5-17-19 just for me" and that Dias was going to attempt suicide. He was also carrying a suicide note with cremation costs and instructions for his body. On October 10, 2019, after five months in jail, Dias pleaded guilty to felony possession of a firearm in a public building and misdemeanor possession of a loaded firearm in public and was sentenced to three years of probation and any necessary mental health treatment.

In June 2018, it was reported that the school's administration and police had repeatedly harassed an autistic teenager, named only as Sanders, his middle name, for months over fears that he was planning a school shooting. Fears were raised after a librarian reported that they had overheard students discussing the recent nationwide school shootings and referred to another student by a nickname "Shooter." The administration falsely identified "Shooter" as Sanders and raised caution over the fact that he was reportedly fascinated by guns, wore a trench coat, and was found with sharpened scissors.

== Notable alumni ==
- Ray Blume (born 1958) - All-American collegiate and pro basketball player
- Isaac Bonton – college basketball player
- Anna Song Canzano – television reporter and anchor
- LeRon Ellis (born 1969) – pro basketball player
- Susan Helms (born 1958) - astronaut
- Eddie Kunz (born 1986) – pro baseball player
- Brian Lindstrom (born 1961) – filmmaker
- Larry Harvey - Burning Man founder
- Jim Pepper - Jazz saxophonist, composer and singer
- Michael Allen Harrison - New Age Musician, songwriter, and pianist
