= Barbara Smith Warner =

American politician

Majority Leader of the Oregon House of Representatives
- In office July 19, 2019 – January 16, 2022
- Preceded by: Jennifer Williamson
- Succeeded by: Julie Fahey

Member of the Oregon House of Representatives from the 45th district
- In office January 15, 2014 – January 9, 2023
- Preceded by: Michael Dembrow
- Succeeded by: Thuy Tran

Personal details
- Born: 1967 (age 58–59) Erie, Pennsylvania, U.S.
- Party: Democratic
- Education: Gannon University (BA)

Barbara Smith Warner (born 1967) is an American Democratic politician from the U.S. state of Oregon. She served as a member of the Oregon House of Representatives for the 45th district from 2014 to 2022.

== Early life and education ==
Born Barbara Smith in Erie, Pennsylvania, she is a graduate of Gannon University.

== Career ==
Warner worked as a labor organizer in Washington, D.C., ran the Oregon House Democratic Caucus, and served as a labor liaison for Senator Ron Wyden and has been active as a community organizer for affordable health care and education access.

In November 2013, Michael Dembrow resigned from his seat in the Oregon House of Representatives when he was appointed to fill Jackie Dingfelder's seat in the Oregon Senate. Multnomah County Commissioners appointed Smith Warner to fill Dembrow's seat in the Oregon House a few weeks later. She was sworn in on January 15, 2014, shortly before the 2014 Legislative Short Session. In July 2019, she was elected as Majority Leader by the Oregon House Democratic Caucus, and served until January 2022.

On March 7, 2022, Smith Warner announced she would retire from the legislature. She was succeeded by optometrist Thuy Tran, a fellow Democrat and a former member of the Parkrose School Board.

In February 2023, Smith Warner was named executive director of The National Vote at Home Institute.

== Personal life ==
Smith Warner and her husband Chris Warner, who served as chief of staff to former Portland City Commissioner Steve Novick, live in Portland's Rose City Park neighborhood with their two children.

== Electoral history ==
2014 Oregon State Representative, 45th district
Party	Candidate	Votes	%
Democratic	Barbara Smith Warner	18,707	96.9
Write-in		604	3.1
Total votes		19,311	100%

2016 Oregon State Representative, 45th district
Party	Candidate	Votes	%
Democratic	Barbara Smith Warner	24,843	98.1
Write-in		488	1.9
Total votes		25,331	100%

2018 Oregon State Representative, 45th district
Party	Candidate	Votes	%
Democratic	Barbara Smith Warner	25,695	97.7
Write-in		598	2.3
Total votes		26,293	100%

2020 Oregon State Representative, 45th district
Party	Candidate	Votes	%
Democratic	Barbara Smith Warner	31,326	97.3
Write-in		883	2.7
Total votes		32,209	100%

Oregon House of Representatives
Preceded by Jennifer Williamson	Majority Leader of the Oregon House of Representatives; 2019–2022	Succeeded by Julie Fahey
