= Thuy Tran =

American politician and optometrist

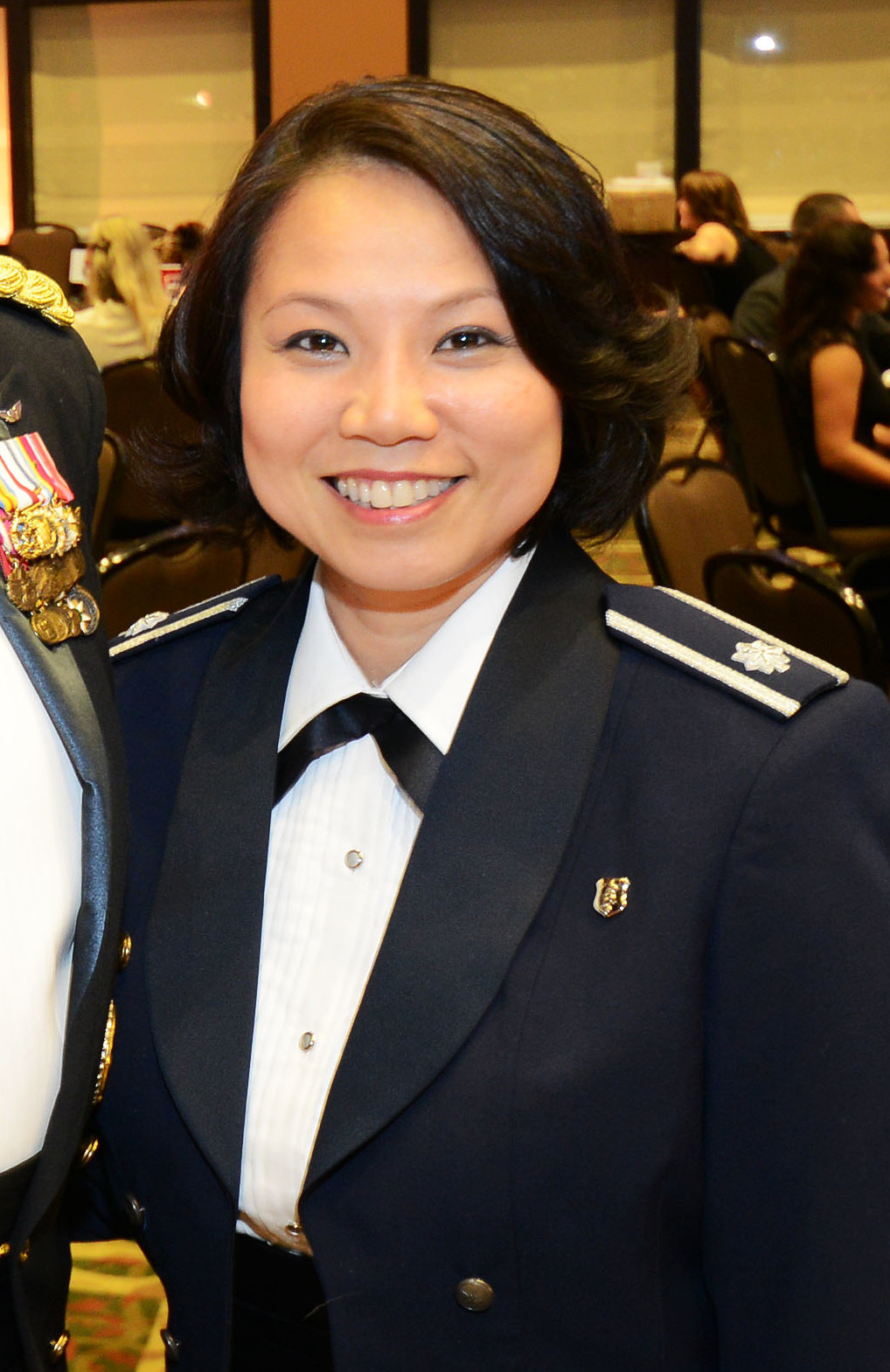

Member of the Oregon House of Representatives from the 45th district
- Incumbent
- Assumed office January 9, 2023
- Preceded by: Barbara Smith Warner

Personal details
- Born: South Vietnam (now Vietnam)
- Party: Democratic
- Education: University of California, Los Angeles (BS); Pacific University (OD); George Fox University (MBA)

Military service
- Branch/service: United States Air Force
- Unit: Oregon Air National Guard

Thuy Tran is an American politician and optometrist serving as a member of the Oregon House of Representatives for the 45th district. Elected in November 2022, she assumed office in January 2023.

== Early life and education ==
Tran was born in South Vietnam and immigrated to the United States with her family as a child. She earned a Bachelor of Science degree in biology from the University of California, Los Angeles, a Doctor of Optometry from Pacific University, and a Master of Business Administration from George Fox University.

== Career ==
Since 1995, Tran has owned and operated Rose City Vision which has two locations in Portland, Oregon. From 2012 to 2015, she served as a member of the Parkrose School District Board. Tran is also a lieutenant colonel in the Oregon Air National Guard. Tran was elected to the Oregon House of Representatives in November 2022.

During the 2025 Legislative Session, Tran chaired the House Committee on Emergency Management, General Government and Veterans.

== Electoral history ==
=== 2024 ===
2024 Oregon State Representative, 45th district
Party	Candidate	Votes	%
Democratic	Thuy Tran	29,118	98.0
Write-in		582	2.0
Total votes		29,700	100%

=== 2022 ===
2022 Oregon House of Representatives 45th district election
Party	Candidate	Votes	%
Democratic	Thuy Tran	28,946	84.07
Republican	George Donnerberg	5,465	15.87
Write-in		21	0.06
Total votes		34,432	100.0

2022 Oregon House of Representatives 45th district Democratic primary
Party	Candidate	Votes	%
Democratic	Thuy Tran	10,657	72.61
Democratic	Catherine Thomasson	4,010	27.32
Democratic	Write-in	11	0.07
Total votes		14,678	100.0
