= Ben Bowman (politician) =

American politician (born 1992)

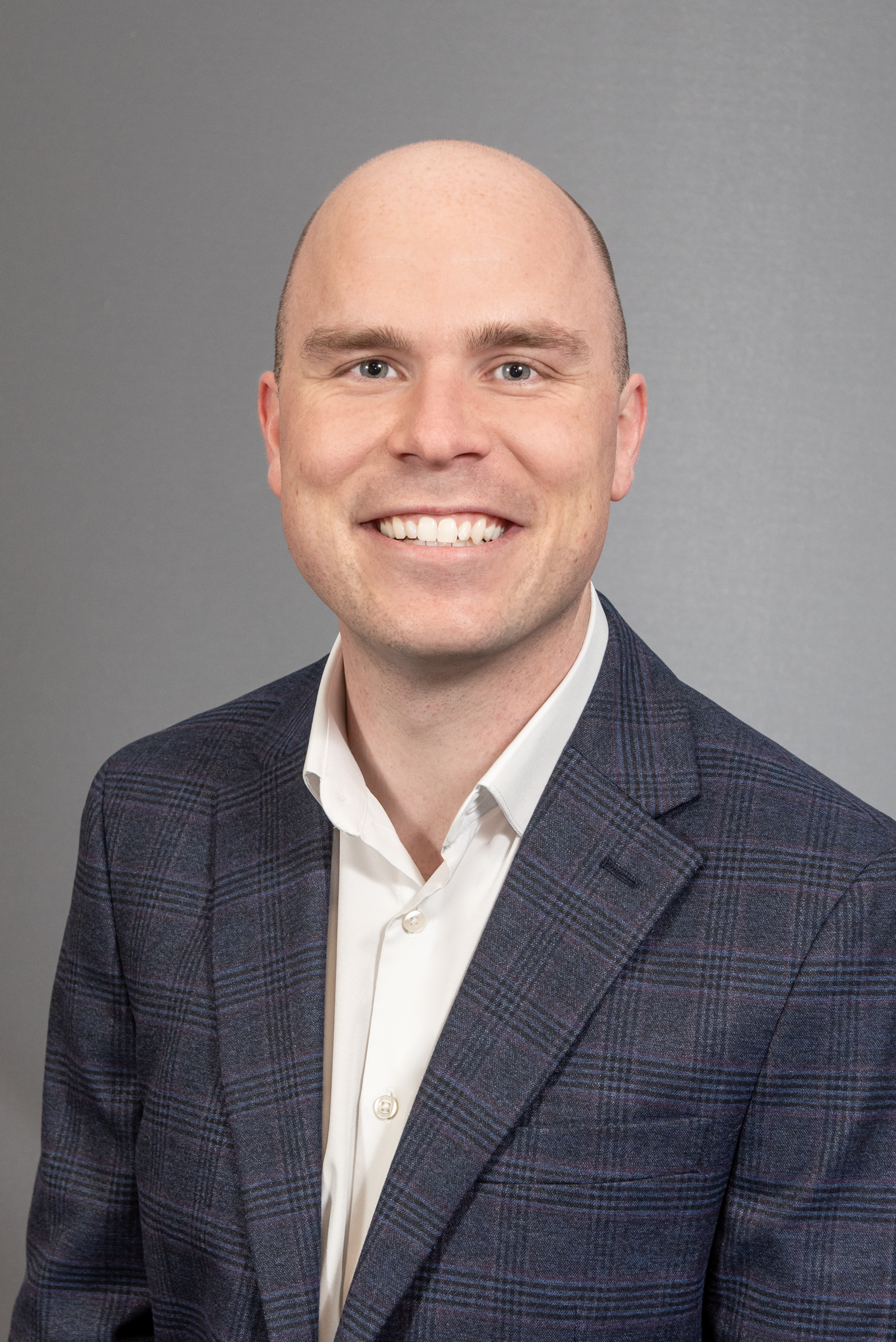

Majority Leader of the Oregon House of Representatives
- Incumbent
- Assumed office March 21, 2024
- Preceded by: Julie Fahey

Member of the Oregon House of Representatives from the 25th district
- Incumbent
- Assumed office January 9, 2023
- Preceded by: Jessica George

Personal details
- Born: January 23, 1992 (age 34) Portland, Oregon, U.S.
- Party: Democratic
- Education: University of Oregon (BA); Stanford University (MA)
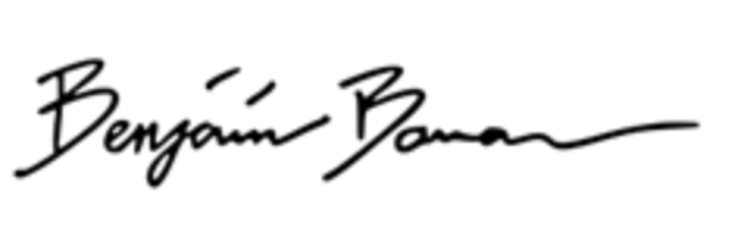
- Signature

Benjamin William Bowman (born January 23, 1992) is an American Democratic politician who is the Majority Leader of the Oregon House of Representatives. He represents 25th district, which includes Tigard and parts of Durham and south Beaverton.

== Political career ==
In 2019, at age 27, Bowman was elected to the Tigard-Tualatin school board, the school district he attended as a child, being a Tualatin High School alumni. He is the youngest person ever elected to the district's school board.

In the 2022 election, he defeated Republican nominee Bob Niemeyer to win election to his House seat. He has filed for reelection in the 2024 Oregon House of Representatives election.

On March 21, 2024, Oregon House Democrats elected him as House Majority Leader.

== Electoral history ==
2020 Oregon State Senator, 18th district Democratic primary
Party	Candidate	Votes	%
Democratic	Ginny Burdick	20,634	69.2
Democratic	Ben Bowman	9,138	30.7
Write-in		35	0.1
Total votes		31,599	100%

2022 Oregon State Representative, 25th district Democratic primary
Party	Candidate	Votes	%
Democratic	Ben Bowman	6,818	98.7
Write-in		92	1.3
Total votes		31,599	100%

2022 Oregon State Representative, 25th district
Party	Candidate	Votes	%
Democratic	Ben Bowman	20,636	65.3
Republican	Bob Niemeyer	10,907	34.5
Write-in		56	0.2
Total votes		31,599	100%

2024 Oregon State Representative, 25th district
Party	Candidate	Votes	%
Democratic	Ben Bowman	24,096	67.6
Republican	Bob Niemeyer	11,473	32.2
Write-in		60	0.2
Total votes		35,629	100%

== Personal life ==
Bowman, who is gay, was the first openly LGBTQ+ chair of the Tigard-Tualatin school board.

Oregon House of Representatives
Preceded by Julie Fahey	Majority Leader of the Oregon House of Representatives; 2024–present	Incumbent
