= Oregon's 23rd Senate district =

American legislative district

Oregon's 23rd Senate District as of September 27, 2021

District 23 of the Oregon State Senate comprises parts of Portland and the entirety of Maywood Park in Multnomah County. The district is composed of Oregon House districts 45 and 46. It is currently represented by Democrat Khanh Pham of Portland.

== Election results ==
District boundaries have changed over time. Therefore, senators before 2021 may not represent the same constituency as today. From 1993 until 2003, the district covered parts of Southern Oregon; from 2003 until 2013, it shifted to its current location and covered more of inner northeast Portland; and from 2013 until 2023, it covered more land east of I-205.

The current district is similar to its previous iterations, but does not cover any land east of I-205 not in the Lents neighborhood and extends south to the border of Multnomah County by adding the Brentwood-Darlington neighborhood.

The results are as follows:

Year	Candidate	Party	Percent	Opponent	Party	Percent
1984	John Kitzhaber	Democratic	57.1%	Sylvia Henry	Republican	42.9%
1988	John Kitzhaber	Democratic	60.4%	Bill Fisher	Republican	39.6%
1992	Rod Johnson	Republican	67.1%	Judi Pettengill	Democratic	32.9%
1996	Bill Fisher	Republican	65.3%	Donald A. Dole	Democratic	34.7%
2000	Bill Fisher	Republican	69.3%	Larry Mack	Democratic	30.7%
2004	Avel Gordly	Democratic	88.7%	Lou Burbach	Constitution	11.2%
2008	Jackie Dingfelder	Democratic	97.7%	Unopposed		
2012	Jackie Dingfelder	Democratic	80.1%	Tracy Olsen	Independent	19.2%
2014 (Note: Off-cycle election due to the resignation of Jackie Dingfelder in 2013 to join the staff of the newly elected mayor of Portland, Charlie Hales. Michael Dembrow was the incumbent in this election as he was appointed to the vacant seat.)	Michael Dembrow	Democratic	86.3%	Michael Marvin	Libertarian	12.8%
2016	Michael Dembrow	Democratic	97.8%	Unopposed		
2020	Michael Dembrow	Democratic	97.0%	Unopposed		
2024	Khanh Pham	Democratic	97.5%	Unopposed		
