= John Mabrey =

American politician

Member of the Oregon House of Representatives from the 59th district
- In office January 13, 2003 – c. March 2003
- Preceded by: Lynn Lundquist
- Preceded by: John Dallum
- Succeeded by: Greg Smith

Personal details
- Party: Republican
- Spouse: Janet Hawkins

John Mabrey is an American politician and criminal who served part of a term in the Oregon House of Representatives for the 59th district before resigning. He allegedly committed 10 counts of theft related to insurance.
