= Keanon Lowe =

American football coach and former football player

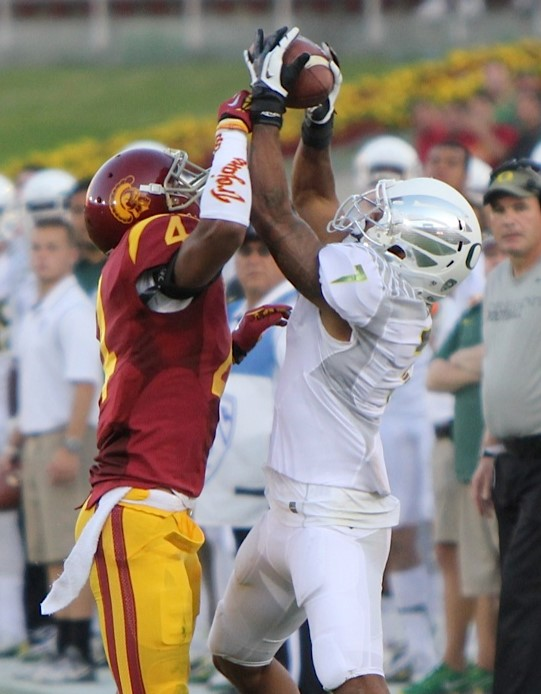
- Keanon Lowe (right) during a game against USC Trojans in 2012

Personal information
- Home town: Portland, Oregon, U.S.
- Education: Jesuit High School; University of Oregon
- Spouse: Midori Lowe (2024-present)

Sport
- Sport: American football
- Position: Wide receiver
- University team: Oregon Ducks

Keanon Lowe is an American athletics coach and former football player for the Oregon Ducks. He is known for preventing a school shooting and suicide of a student by disarming the student and then hugging him, which was caught on security footage.

== Early life ==
Lowe grew up in Portland, Oregon in the suburb of Gresham. He is the second child of Jennifer Lowe and Kevin Lowe. He attended Jesuit High School in Portland, Oregon. In 2009, Lowe received 1st Team All State Honors at wide receiver and defensive back, as well as the 6A state Defensive Player of the Year. Lowe was also selected with the honor of being a High School All-American, playing in the 2010 Army All-American Bowl in San Antonio, Texas alongside Keenan Allen, Tony Jefferson, and Robert Woods.

Lowe still holds the record for rushing touchdowns in an Oregon state championship when he nearly lead his team back from a three touchdown deficit in 50-43 loss to Sheldon High School. Lowe amassed 40 carries for 310 yards and 6 Touchdowns, and added an interception on the defensive side.

In his 3 varsity seasons, Lowe caught 107 passes for 1,966 yards and 22 touchdowns. As a senior he filled in at running back with 1,213 yards and 20 touchdowns on the ground.

=== College Football career ===
In 2010, Lowe signed onto the Oregon Ducks as a student athlete. Lowe was a 3-year starter at Wide Receiver on an Oregon Duck offense that also featured Marcus Mariota, DeAnthony Thomas, LaMichael James, Kenjon Barner, Josh Huff, Thomas Tyner, and Colt Lyerla.

Lowe finished his Oregon Ducks football career as a two-time Rose Bowl Champion (2012/2014), a Fiesta Bowl Champion (2013), a Pac-10 (2010) and Pac-12 Champion (2014) and a 2 time National Championship Game participant (2010/2015). Keanon is credited with the first ever Touchdown in the College Football Playoff National Championship Game when he scored on the opening drive in a 42-20 loss to Ohio State in 2015. He finished his Oregon Ducks career with 68 catches, 891 yards, and 11 touchdowns.

== Post-football career ==
After playing wide receiver for the team, he then went to work in Philadelphia as an analyst for the Philadelphia Eagles and later as an offensive analyst for the San Francisco 49ers. After a short NFL stint he transitioned to coaching high school football, first at his alma mater, Jesuit High School then he moved to Parkrose High School and became the head coach for both football and track and field. In January 2020, Lowe was named the head football coach at West Linn High School, taking over from Chris Miller. He later resigned in June to join Chip Kelly at UCLA, becoming a football offensive analyst for the UCLA Bruins. In February 2021, Lowe left UCLA to join Scott Frost at University of Nebraska–Lincoln, serving as an offense analyst for the Nebraska Cornhuskers. College GameDay aired a special about Lowe on their program.

=== 2019 Parkrose High incident ===
On May 17, 2019, 18-year-old student Angel Granados-Diaz entered Parkrose High School wearing a black trench coat and carrying a shotgun loaded with a single shell. Lowe was sent to retrieve Diaz to bring him to the counselor's office and was looking for him in the morning. After Diaz walked into the same classroom that Lowe was in, Lowe grabbed the shotgun and gave it to a faculty member to keep it away from Diaz, then embraced Diaz. The incident was captured on security footage and Lowe was hailed as a hero for his actions in preventing a school shooting. On 10 October 2019 Diaz was sentenced to mental health treatment and three years of probation, and because of his actions, Lowe received the Citizen Honor Award by the Congressional Medal of Honor Society on March 31, 2020.

=== Movie ===
On December 10, 2020, The Walt Disney Company announced that they were making a movie about Lowe produced by Seven Bucks Productions, currently known only as The Keanon Lowe project. As of September 2022, no release date or further information had been announced.

=== Book ===
Lowe is the author of Hometown Victory: A Coach's Story of Football, Fate, and Coming Home, published by Macmillan in 2022.
