= Oregon Senate Bill 577 =

Oregon State Legislature
- Full name: Relating to bias crimes; and declaring an emergency.
- Introduced: January 14, 2019
- House voted: June 19, 2019
- Senate voted: June 13, 2019
- Signed into law: July 15, 2019
- Governor: Kate Brown

Status: Current legislation

Oregon Senate Bill 577 was a change to Oregon's Hate Crimes Law. Bias is defined as "disproportionate weight in favor of or against an idea or thing, usually in a way that is closed-minded, prejudicial, or unfair. Biases can be innate or learned. People may develop biases for or against an individual, a group, or a belief". A bias crime or a bias-motivated crime is a more official label for a hate crime. These changes "made it a class A misdemeanor to damage someone’s property, intentionally subject them to offensive physical contact or intentionally cause serious injury on a person based on race, color, religion, sexual orientation, disability or national origin. It also removes the prior requirement that a hate crime had to involve more than one suspect". Oregon Senate Bill 577 was put into effect on July 15, 2019. This was the first time this law had been updated in almost 40 years.

Other than just the additions of what is defined as a crime, "The bill would also require all police agencies to document reports of alleged hate crimes – whether or not they result in arrest – and share information with the state criminal justice division. District attorneys will also be required to track their hate crime case loads and report on outcomes, sentences and recidivism". With police and attorneys registering the crimes that they deal with, it will give a more accurate representation of how many bias crimes are reported and dealt with. Even with this editing of the bill "National data collection can be complicated by inconsistent reporting requirements on the state level. For example, as of 2019, 37 states still do not have anti-bias statutes for crimes based on gender identity". with the requirement of police and attorneys registering these crimes, more data will give us an accurate representation, and possibly make more states implement bias crime laws.

There are a multitude of supporters behind the bill such as "Unite Oregon, American Civil Liberties Union of Oregon, Basic Rights Oregon, and CAIR-Oregon; Oregon State Police; Salem Police Chief Jerry Moore; and the Multnomah County District Attorney's Office". No one has officially submitted any testimony against the bill.

== Timeline of OSB 577 ==
On January 14, 2019, in the Senate:

- Introduction and first reading. Referred to President's desk.

On January 17, 2019, in the Senate:

- Referred to Judiciary, then Ways and Means.

On March 12, 2019, in the Senate:

- Public Hearing held.

On April 4, 2019, in the Senate:

- Work Session held.

On April 23, 2019, in the Senate:

- Referred to Ways and Means by prior reference.
- Recommendation: Do pass with amendments and be referred to Ways and Means by prior reference. (Printed A-Eng.)

On June 3, 2019, in the Senate:

- Assigned to Subcommittee on Public Safety.

On June 5, 2019, in the Senate:

- Returned to Full Committee.
- Work Session held.

On June 7, 2019, in the Senate:

- Work Session held.

On June 11, 2019, in the Senate:

- Recommendation: Do pass with amendments to the A-Eng. bill. (Printed B-Eng.)

On June 12, 2019, in the Senate:

- Second reading.

On June 13, 2019, in the Senate:

- Steiner Hayward, excused when vote taken, granted unanimous consent to vote aye.
- Third reading. Carried by Frederick. Passed. Ayes, 27; Excused, 2--Boquist, Johnson.

On June 17, 2019, in the House:

- Referred to Ways and Means.
- First reading. Referred to Speaker's desk.

On June 18, 2019, in the House:

- Second reading.
- Recommendation: Do pass.

On June 19, 2019, in the House:

- Third reading. Carried by Williamson. Passed. Ayes, 59; Excused for Business of the House, 1--Power.

On June 24, 2019, in the Senate:

- President signed.

On June 25, 2019, in the House:

- Speaker signed.

On July 15, 2019, in the Senate:

- Governor signed.

On July 23, 2019, in the Senate:

- Effective date, July 15, 2019.
- Chapter 553, 2019 Laws.
