= Michael Dembrow =

American politician

Michael E. Dembrow
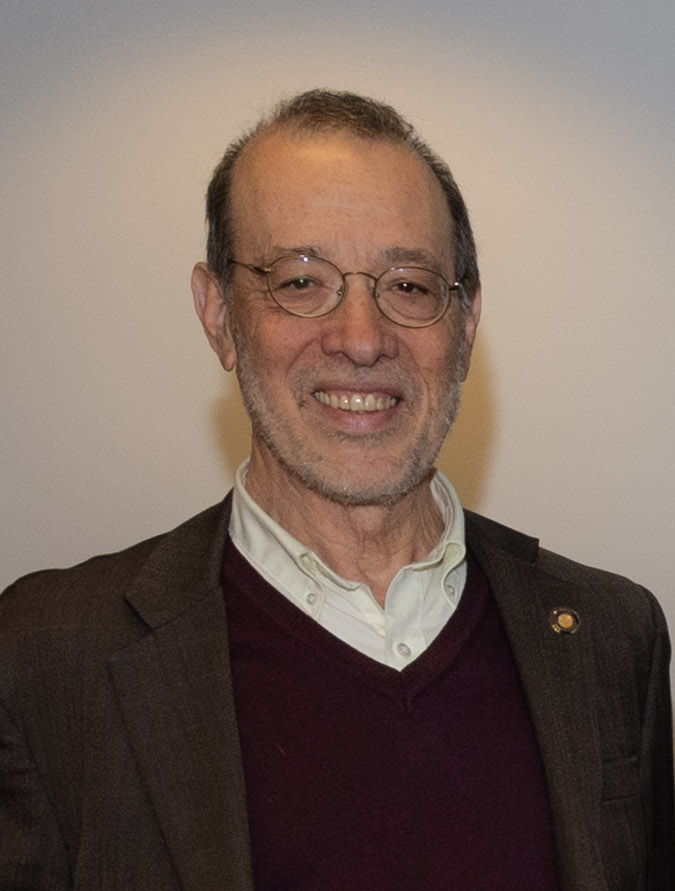

Member of the Oregon Senate from the 23rd district
- In office November 20, 2013 – January 13, 2025
- Preceded by: Jackie Dingfelder
- Succeeded by: Khanh Pham

Member of the Oregon House of Representatives from the 45th district
- In office January 12, 2009 – November 20, 2013
- Preceded by: Jackie Dingfelder
- Succeeded by: Barbara Smith Warner

Personal details
- Born: 1951 or 1952 (age 74–75)
- Party: Democratic
- Spouse: Catherine Dembrow
- Children: Nikolai C. Dembrow; Tatyana Janine Dembrow
- Education: University of Connecticut; Indiana University
- Profession: Educator
- Website: www.michaeldembrow.com

Michael E. Dembrow (born c. 1951) is an American Democratic politician from the US state of Oregon who represented District 23 (which contains northeastern Portland, Maywood Park and Parkrose) in the Oregon Senate from 2013 to 2025. Before his appointment to the Oregon Senate, Dembrow served in the Oregon House of Representatives serving District 45. Dembrow, formerly an English instructor at Portland Community College, served on Governor Ted Kulongoski's State Board of Higher Education. The Oregon League of Conservation Voters and Willamette Week endorsed Dembrow during the 2008 legislative election.

== Career ==
According to Dembrow's official site, he is a former English instructor at Portland Community College (PCC), was President of the PCC faculty union for sixteen years, and was appointed to the State Board of Education in 2007. In 1991, Dembrow helped to create the Cascade Festival of African Films. Dembrow earned an undergraduate degree in English from the University of Connecticut and his Master's degree in Comparative Literature from Indiana University Bloomington. In 2009, Dembrow and Representative Chuck Riley (D-Hillsboro) introduced House Bill 2578, a proposal which required towers to contact property owners or tenants before towing. The bill also allowed the vehicle owner to move their vehicle "without fees beyond the initial hookup", and required that landlords clearly display parking rules.

In 2013, following Jackie Dingfelder's resignation to serve in the office of Portland Mayor Charlie Hales, Dembrow was appointed by Multnomah County Commissioners to fill her seat in the 23rd Senate District. He was sworn in on November 20, 2013.

Dembrow announced his retirement at the end of the 2024 short session on March 7, 2024, after serving in the Legislative Assembly for 15 years.

== Personal life ==
According to Willamette Week, Dembrow is Jewish.

== Electoral history ==
2008 Oregon State Representative, 45th district
Party	Candidate	Votes	%
Democratic	Michael E Dembrow	22,954	88.0
Libertarian	Jim Karlock	2,932	11.2
Write-in		189	0.7
Total votes		26,075	100%

2010 Oregon State Representative, 45th district
Party	Candidate	Votes	%
Democratic	Michael Dembrow	18,945	79.1
Republican	Anne Marie Gurney	4,932	20.6
Write-in		68	0.3
Total votes		23,945	100%

2012 Oregon State Representative, 45th district
Party	Candidate	Votes	%
Democratic	Michael Dembrow	24,403	82.2
Republican	Anne Marie Gurney	5,177	17.4
Write-in		114	0.4
Total votes		29,694	100%

2014 Oregon State Senator, 23rd district
Party	Candidate	Votes	%
Democratic	Michael Dembrow	40,948	86.3
Libertarian	Michael Marvin	6,097	12.8
Write-in		419	0.9
Total votes		47,464	100%

2016 Oregon State Senator, 23rd district
Party	Candidate	Votes	%
Democratic	Michael Dembrow	48,722	97.8
Write-in		1,071	2.2
Total votes		49,793	100%

2020 Oregon State Senator, 23rd district
Party	Candidate	Votes	%
Democratic	Michael Dembrow	61,638	97.0
Write-in		1,885	3.0
Total votes		63,523	100%

== See also ==
- 76th Oregon Legislative Assembly
