= Bill Post =

American politician and radio personality

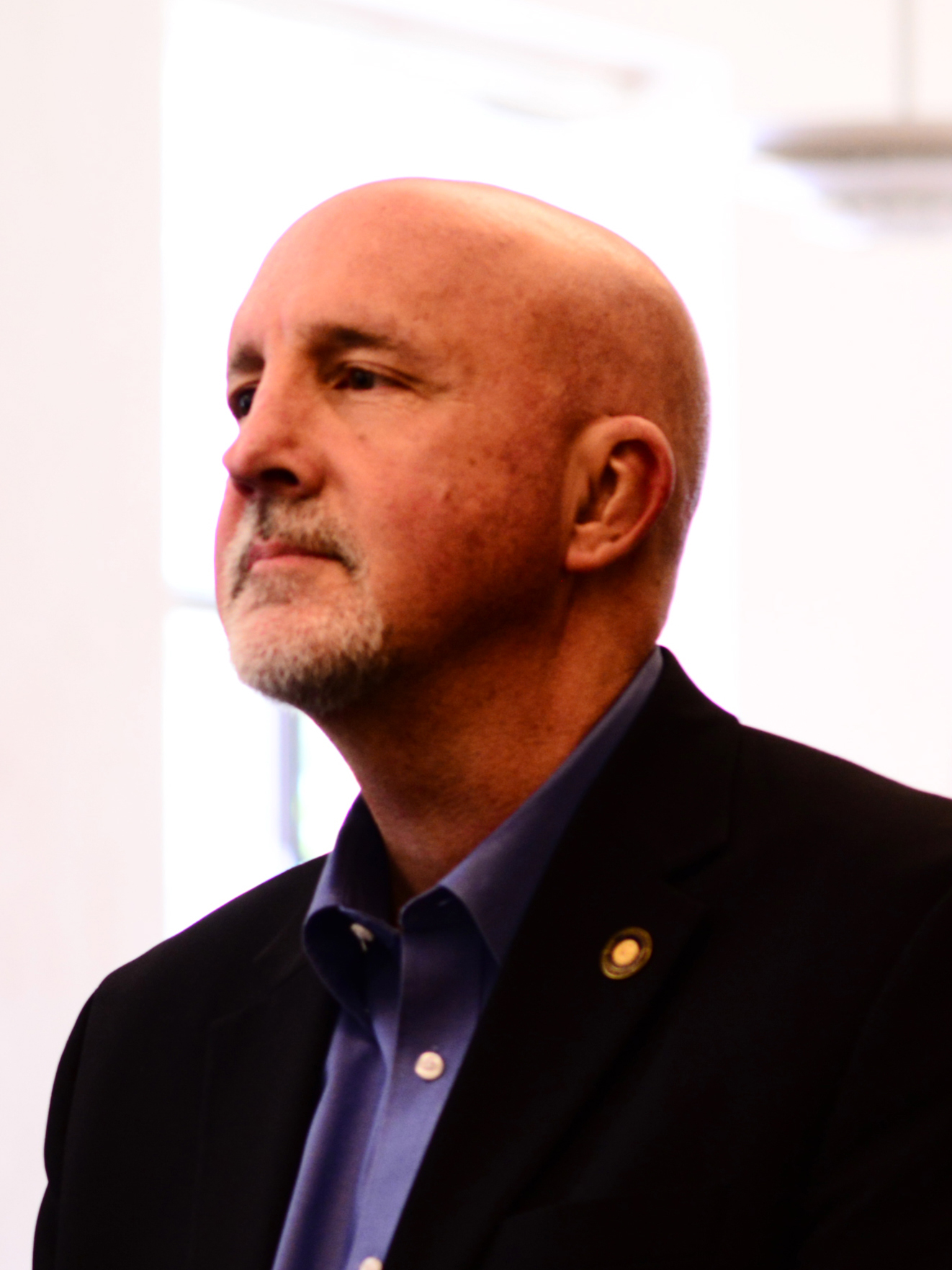

Member of the Oregon House of Representatives from the 25th district
- In office January 12, 2015 – November 30, 2021
- Preceded by: Kim Thatcher
- Succeeded by: Jessica George

Personal details
- Born: Glendale, Arizona, U.S.
- Party: Republican
- Spouse: Colleen Post
- Children: 1
- Education: Southern Oregon State College (BS)
- Profession: Radio host
- Website: www.billpost.com

Bill Post is an American politician, radio personality, and former Oregon State Legislator who is a member of the Republican Party. In 2014, he was elected to represent Oregon's House District 25 in the Oregon House of Representatives. He was a conservative talk radio host until March 2014, when he suspended his show after garnering a Republican primary opponent, Barbara Jensen of Keizer. He stated at the time that he would remain program director and operations manager at the radio station.

Post defeated Jensen in the May 20, 2014 primary and went on to face Independent Party nominee Chuck Lee in the general election, whom he also defeated.

In 2014, Post made the assertion that then Speaker Tina Kotek had, "never held a job or run a business". The nonpartisan group PolitiFact judged that statement as untrue and rated it Pants on Fire on their truth scale. Post admitted to PolitiFact that he was untruthful and made the claim up stating, "I don't know her history. I just pulled that out of my hat."

Post had no primary election challenger in May 2016 and went on to defeat Democratic challenger Sharon Freeman in November 2016.

In 2017, while a sitting State Representative, Post returned to the airwaves on another local AM station, 1220 KPJC, first in the mornings, then moving his show to the 3–6pm time slot.

In 2017, Post was accused of making advances on a female staffer including sending inappropriate text messages about his wife not being home. While Post denied these allegations, An investigation found "that [Post] had engaged in inappropriate and unwelcome conduct, including physical contact, with a Legislative staffer". Post was chastised by his Republican colleagues for his actions.

Post formerly held the seat for Oregon's 25th House district, which includes Keizer, St. Paul, and Newberg.

In the 2021 legislative session, Post was finally successful in passing the "Sudafed Bill", HB 2648, which made behind the counter sales of pseudoephedrine products legal without a prescription, after three previous attempts. Oregon was the last state in the US to have this requirement.

On December 11, 2020, Post and 11 other state Republican officials signed a letter requesting Oregon Attorney General Ellen Rosenblum join Texas and other states contesting the results of the 2020 presidential election in Texas v. Pennsylvania. Rosenblum announced she had filed in behalf of the defense, and against Texas, the day prior.

In September 2021, Post announced he would not be seeking reelection. In October 2021, Post announced that he and his wife had sold their home in Keizer and relocated to Fallon, Nevada, casting doubt on his eligibility to complete his House term scheduled to expire in January 2023. Later that month he officially resigned from his House seat effective November 30, 2021, allowing his eventual successor the opportunity to serve in the 81st Oregon Legislative Assembly. Jessica George, a former legislative aide, was selected on December 10, 2021, to finish Post's term.

In the 2022 general election, Post ran for the position of School Trustee for the Churchill County School Board in Nevada. Post placed 6th out of 7 candidates, coming in second to last, failing to secure a seat as only the top 4 are elected to the board.

== Personal life ==
Post was born at Luke Air Force Base in Glendale, Arizona. He moved to Oregon at an early age and grew up in Albany, Redmond, and Salem. He attended George Fox University and Southern Oregon State College, where he earned a bachelor's degree. He has been involved in radio, first as a deejay and later as a conservative talk radio personality, since 1979. He hosted the Bill Post Radio Show on KYKN from 2009 to 2014.

== Electoral history ==
2014 Oregon State Representative, 25th district
Party	Candidate	Votes	%
Republican	Bill Post	12,555	54.8
Independent	Chuck Lee	9,574	41.8
Pacific Green	Josh Smith	715	3.1
Write-in		50	0.2
Total votes		22,894	100%

2016 Oregon State Representative, 25th district
Party	Candidate	Votes	%
Republican	Bill Post	18,552	63.6
Democratic	Sharon P Freeman	10,528	36.1
Write-in		71	0.2
Total votes		29,151	100%

2018 Oregon State Representative, 25th district
Party	Candidate	Votes	%
Republican	Bill Post	16,736	58.3
Democratic	Dave McCall	11,926	41.6
Write-in		36	0.1
Total votes		28,698	100%

2020 Oregon State Representative, 25th district
Party	Candidate	Votes	%
Republican	Bill Post	20,421	56.6
Democratic	Ramiro Navarro Jr	15,613	43.3
Write-in		57	0.2
Total votes		36,091	100%

Oregon House of Representatives
Preceded by Kim Thatcher	Member of the Oregon House of Representatives from the 25th district 2015-2021	Succeeded by Jessica George
