= Rod Johnson (Oregon politician) =

American politician

Rod Johnson is an American politician who was a member of the Oregon State Senate.

== Personal life ==
Johnson was accused of sexual harassment by five female legislative employees while in office, which he dismissed as being the result of a "politically motivated witch hunt" against him.

His daughter Jessica George was appointed to the Oregon House of Representatives in December 2021.
