= Jackie Dingfelder =

American politician

Member of the Oregon Senate from the 23rd district
- In office 2009–2013
- Preceded by: Avel Gordly
- Succeeded by: Michael Dembrow

Member of the Oregon House of Representatives from the 19th (through 2002), then 45th district
- In office 2001–2009
- Preceded by: Jo Ann Bowman (before redistricting)
- Succeeded by: Michael Dembrow (after redistricting)

Personal details
- Party: Democratic
- Spouse: Tom
- Occupation: Environmental planner

Jackie Dingfelder is a Democratic politician in the U.S. state of Oregon. She is a former member of the Oregon State Senate and the Oregon House of Representatives, and later served as a part of Portland, Oregon Mayor Charlie Hales' staff.

== Early life ==
Dingfelder has a bachelor's degree in Geography-Ecosystems Management from the University of California, Los Angeles and a master's degree in regional planning, with an emphasis on water resources management, from the University of North Carolina at Chapel Hill.

== Political career ==
Dingfelder was appointed to the Oregon House of Representatives, representing District 19, in April 2001, to fill a vacancy created by the resignation of Jo Ann Hardesty (née Bowman). After redistricting based on data from the 2000 Census, Dingfelder represented House District 45. In the 2007–2008 session, Dingfelder chaired the House Energy and Environment Committee, and sat on the Agriculture and Natural Resources Committee. She also chaired a conference committee.

In 2009, she joined the Oregon State Senate representing District 23 (Northeast and Southeast Portland). In the Senate she chaired the Senate Environment & Natural Resources Committee, and sat on the Joint Ways and Means Subcommittee on Natural Resources and the Senate Judiciary Committee. Her support and advocacy in animal-related measures saw her labeled as a 2011 "Top Dog" by the Oregon Humane Society. In October 2013, Dingfelder resigned from the Senate to join the staff of the mayor of Portland. She resigned in July 2015 to pursue other interests.

== Electoral history ==
2004 Oregon State Representative, 45th district
Party	Candidate	Votes	%
Democratic	Jackie Dingfelder	23,561	89.7
Freedom Socialist	Jordana Sardo	2,297	8.7
Write-in		423	1.6
Total votes		26,281	100%

2006 Oregon State Representative, 45th district
Party	Candidate	Votes	%
Democratic	Jackie Dingfelder	18,460	79.8
Republican	Dick Osborne	4,603	19.9
Write-in		73	0.3
Total votes		23,136	100%

2008 Oregon State Senator, 23rd district
Party	Candidate	Votes	%
Democratic	Jackie Dingfelder	44,631	97.7
Write-in		1,058	2.3
Total votes		45,689	100%

2012 Oregon State Senator, 23rd district
Party	Candidate	Votes	%
Democratic	Jackie Dingfelder	43,582	80.1
Independent	Tracy Olsen	10,459	19.2
Write-in		378	0.7
Total votes		54,419	100%
