= Oregon's 45th House district =

Legislative districts in the state of Oregon

Oregon's 45th House district after redistricting after the 2020 Census

District 45 of the Oregon House of Representatives is one of 60 House legislative districts in the state of Oregon. As of 2021, the district is contained entirely within Multnomah County and includes parts of inner northeast and southeast Portland as well as Parkrose and Argay in outer northeast Portland and the independent enclave of Maywood Park. The current representative for the district is Democrat Thuy Tran of Portland.

== Election results ==
District boundaries have changed over time. Therefore, representatives before 2021 may not represent the same constituency as today. General election results from 2000 to present are as follows:

Year	Candidate	Party	Percent	Opponent	Party	Percent	Write-in percentage
2000	Jeff Kruse	Republican	68.43%	Charles Lee	Democratic	31.57%	
2002 (Note: Jackie Dingfelder was the incumbent in this election. She previously represented District 19, but was moved to this district due to redistricting following the 2000 United States census.)	Jackie Dingfelder	Democratic	89.61%	Art Scarborough	Socialist	7.90%	2.49%
2004	Jackie Dingfelder	Democratic	89.65%	Jordana Sardo	Freedom Socialist	8.74%	1.61%
2006 (Note: While Dick Osborne is a Republican, he ran as a write-in candidate in this election.)	Jackie Dingfelder	Democratic	79.80%	Dick Osborne	Republican	0.32%	19.89%
2008	Michael Dembrow	Democratic	88.03%	Jim Karlock	Libertarian	11.24%	0.72%
2010	Michael Dembrow	Democratic	79.06%	Anne Marie Gurney	Republican	20.66%	0.28%
2012	Michael Dembrow	Democratic	82.18%	Anne Marie Gurney	Republican	17.43%	0.38%
2014 (Note: Barbara Smith Warner was the incumbent in this election. She was appointed to this seat on December 19, 2013 to replace Michael Dembrow, who resigned to take an appointment to the 23rd district seat in the Oregon Senate.)	Barbara Smith Warner	Democratic	96.87%	Unopposed			3.13%
2016	Barbara Smith Warner	Democratic	98.07%	Unopposed			1.93%
2018	Barbara Smith Warner	Democratic	97.73%	Unopposed			2.27%
2020	Barbara Smith Warner	Democratic	97.26%	Unopposed			2.74%
2022	Thuy Tran	Democratic	84.07%	George Donnerberg	Republican	15.87%	0.06%
2024	Thuy Tran	Democratic	98.0%	Unopposed			2.0%

== See also ==
- Oregon Legislative Assembly
- Oregon House of Representatives
