= Jessica George (politician) =

American politician

Member of the Oregon House of Representatives from the 25th district
- In office December 10, 2021 – January 9, 2023
- Preceded by: Bill Post
- Succeeded by: Ben Bowman

Personal details
- Party: Republican

Jessica George (née Johnson) is an American farmer and politician who was appointed to the Oregon House of Representatives for the 25th district on December 10, 2021.

== Career ==
She did not seek re-election in 2022.

== Personal life ==
She is the daughter of former state senator Rod Johnson. She lives in St. Paul, Oregon. She owns a hazelnut farm with her husband.

Oregon House of Representatives
Preceded by Bill Post	Member of the Oregon House of Representatives from the 25th district 2021-2023	Succeeded by Ben Bowman
