= Julie Fahey =

American politician and Speaker of the Oregon House of Representatives

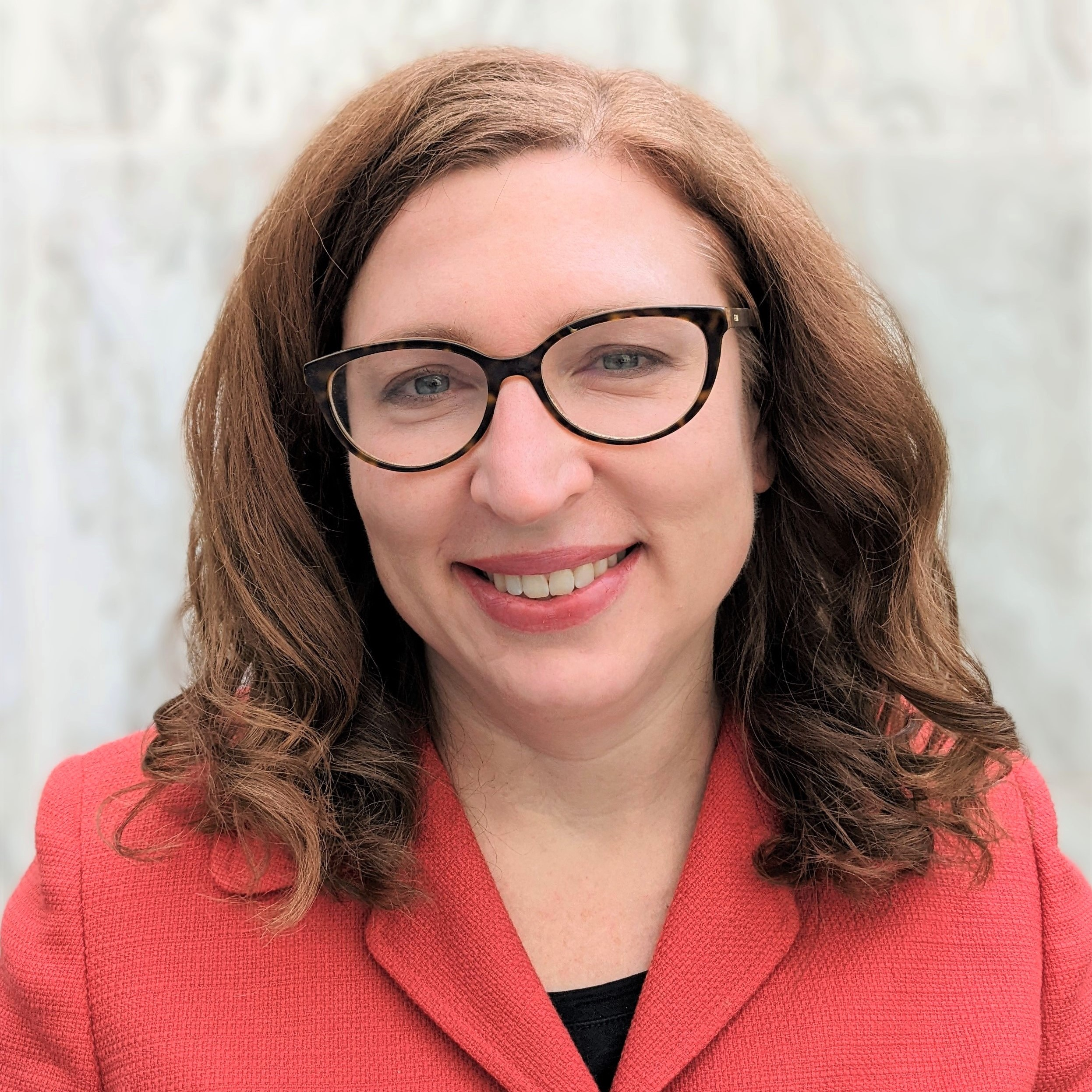
- Fahey in 2022

69th Speaker of the Oregon House of Representatives
- Incumbent
- Assumed office March 7, 2024
- Preceded by: Dan Rayfield

Majority Leader of the Oregon House of Representatives
- In office January 16, 2022 – March 7, 2024
- Preceded by: Barbara Smith Warner
- Succeeded by: Ben Bowman

Member of the Oregon House of Representatives from the 14th district
- Incumbent
- Assumed office January 9, 2017
- Preceded by: Val Hoyle

Personal details
- Born: June 18, 1978 (age 48) Morris, Illinois, U.S.
- Party: Democratic
- Education: University of Notre Dame (BS)
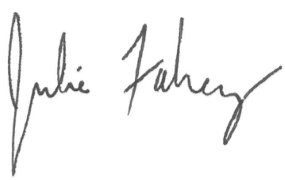
- Signature

Julianne Elizabeth Fahey (/ˈfeɪhi/ FAY-hee; born June 18, 1978) is an American Democratic politician serving as speaker of the Oregon House of Representatives. She represents the 14th district, which covers parts of Lane County, including Veneta and western Eugene.

== Education and career ==
Fahey graduated from the University of Notre Dame in 2000 with a degree in chemistry. Before entering the legislature, she worked as a business consultant and co-founded a human resources consulting firm serving businesses and nonprofits.

Fahey served as Treasurer of the Democratic Party of Oregon from 2015 to 2017, and was chair of the Lane County Democratic Party from 2012 to 2014.

In October 2015, Fahey announced her candidacy for the House seat vacated by Val Hoyle, who retired in order to run for Oregon Secretary of State. Fahey defeated James Manning Jr. in the Democratic primary with 60% of the vote, and in the general election defeated Republican Kathy Lamberg with 52% of the vote.

In the 2023 session, as majority leader, Fahey supported a $200 million housing and homelessness package that passed the House with bipartisan votes.

In the 2025 regular session, the Legislature adjourned without passing a transportation funding package. Governor Tina Kotek called a special session beginning August 29, 2025, in which Fahey co-chaired the joint committee on transportation funding. The session's first day was delayed while Democratic leaders worked to assemble a quorum. The resulting package raised the gas tax, vehicle fees, and a transit payroll tax. Republicans gathered signatures to refer it to votes, and in May 2026, voters rejected it as Measure 120 by a margin of more than 80%.

Fahey was elected speaker by the full House on January 13, 2025 for the 83rd Legislative Assembly, after being chosen to fill the vacancy created when Dan Rayfield resigned in March 2024. During the 2025-26 period, OPB reported criticism within the Democratic caucus of her handling of the 2025 transportation package and of a February 2026 dispute between Representatives Thuy Tran and Jason Kropf.

On November 20, 2026, House Democrats voted in a closed-door caucus meeting to nominate Majority Leader Ben Bowman for speaker rather than Fahey, the first time in nearly three decades than an Oregon House speaker was denied a new term by their caucus. The vote came after Democrats won their largest-ever majority in the chamber. The full House is scheduled to elected a speaker in January 2027. Fahey said she saw an opportunity for the party to move forward.

== Electoral history ==
2016 Oregon State Representative, 14th district
Party	Candidate	Votes	%
Democratic	Julie Fahey	16,292	51.9
Republican	Kathy Lamberg	15,062	47.9
Write-in		67	0.2
Total votes		31,421	100%

2018 Oregon State Representative, 14th district
Party	Candidate	Votes	%
Democratic	Julie Fahey	17,264	61.0
Republican	Rich Cunningham	10,969	38.8
Write-in		64	0.2
Total votes		28,297	100%

2020 Oregon State Representative, 14th district
Party	Candidate	Votes	%
Democratic	Julie Fahey	21,669	59.1
Republican	Rich Cunningham	14,900	40.6
Write-in		92	0.3
Total votes		36,661	100%

2022 Oregon State Representative, 14th district
Party	Candidate	Votes	%
Democratic	Julie Fahey	17,887	59.7
Republican	Stan Stubblefield	12,010	40.1
Write-in		59	0.2
Total votes		29,956	100%

2024 Oregon State Representative, 14th district
Party	Candidate	Votes	%
Democratic	Julie Fahey	22,176	94.1
Write-in		1,392	5.9
Total votes		23,568	100%

2026 Oregon State Representative, 14th district Democratic primary
Party	Candidate	Votes	%
Democratic	Julie Fahey	7,657	93.0
Democratic	Erik Glass	548	6.7
Write-in		30	0.4
Total votes		8,235	100

Oregon House of Representatives
Preceded by Barbara Smith Warner	Majority Leader of the Oregon House of Representatives; 2022–2024	Succeeded by Ben Bowman
Political offices
Preceded by Dan Rayfield	Speaker of the Oregon House of Representatives; 2024–present	Incumbent
