= Greg Smith (Oregon politician) =

American politician

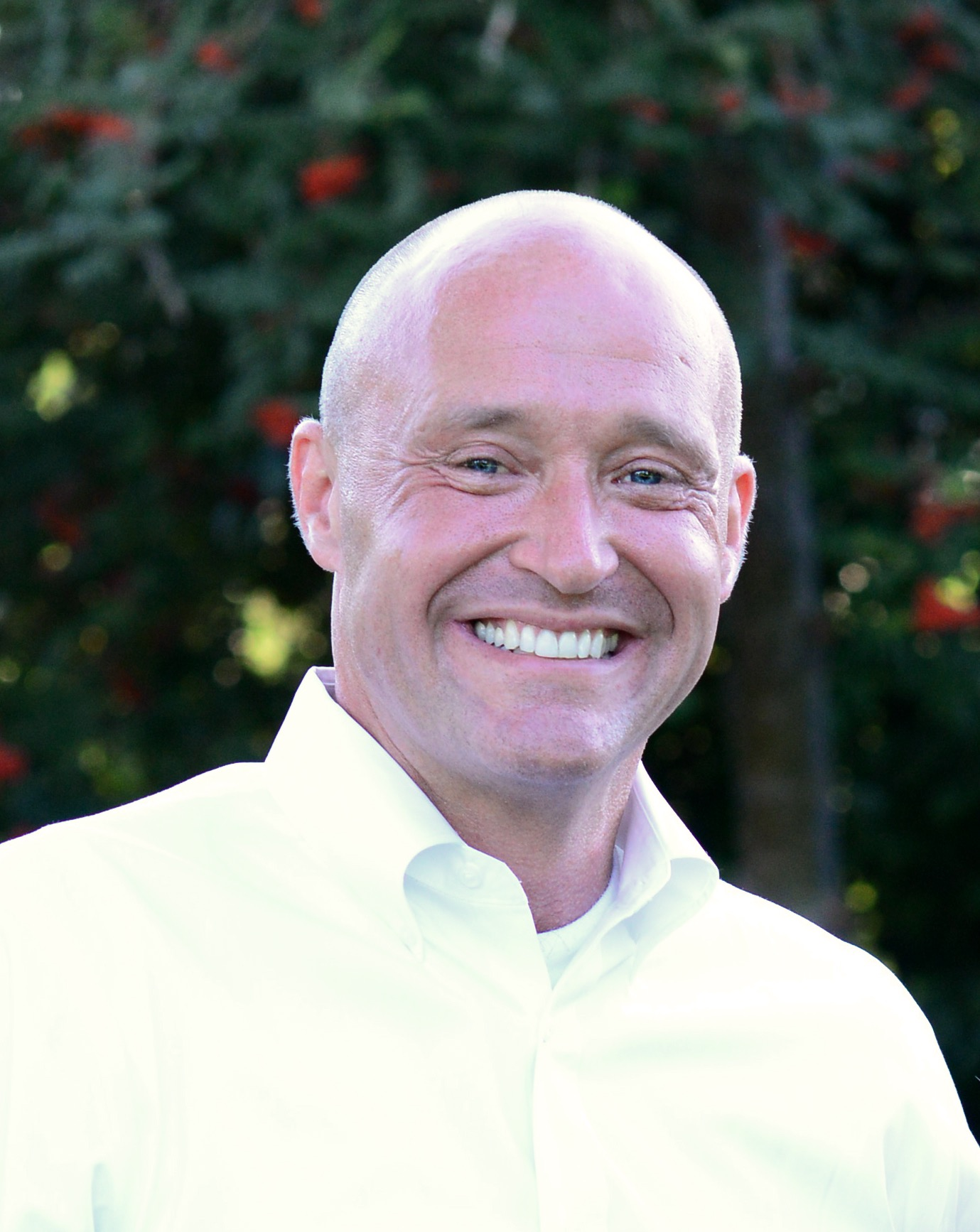
- Smith in 2015

Member of the Oregon House of Representatives from the 57th district
- Incumbent
- Assumed office 2002
- Preceded by: Lynn Lundquist

Member of the Oregon House of Representatives from the 59th district
- In office 2001–2002
- Preceded by: Lynn Lundquist
- Succeeded by: John Mabrey

Personal details
- Born: November 7, 1968 (age 57) Portland, Oregon, U.S.
- Party: Republican
- Spouse: Sherri
- Children: 5
- Education: Eastern Oregon University (BLS)

Greg V. Smith (born November 7, 1968) is an American politician serving as a member of the Oregon House of Representatives from the 57th district. As of 2025, he is the longest-serving member of the Oregon House.

== Early life ==
Smith is descended from Oregon pioneers. He grew up near Portland and attended Sam Barlow High School. He achieved the rank of Eagle Scout in the Boy Scouts.

== Education and career ==
Smith graduated from Eastern Oregon University in 1992 with a bachelor's degree in Liberal Studies. He owns a consulting firm, Gregory Smith & Company, LLC. As of 2019, he also earned $31,200 a year for his work as a legislator. He served as the Executive Director of the Columbia Development Authority (CDA) until resigning in January, 2026, stating that his "ongoing involvement was diverting focus from the Authority's core objectives." The distraction was associated with a December, 2025 Oregon Ethics Commission finding that he broke multiple state ethics laws by attempting to conceal a $66,000 per year pay raise from the CDA Board within a federal grant application.

== Political career ==
=== Early political involvement ===
After graduating from college, Smith served as a community advisory member for Senator Gordon Smith. He was also an intern for then-Oregon House of Representatives Majority Leader Greg Walden. In 1996, Smith was an alternate delegate in the 1996 Republican National Convention.

=== Oregon House of Representatives ===
In 2000, Smith successfully ran for Oregon State Representative for district 59. In 2001, redistricting moved Smith into Oregon's 57th House district, which comprises all of Gilliam, Morrow, Sherman, and Wheeler counties, most of Wasco County, parts of Jefferson and Umatilla counties, and small areas of Clackamas and Marion counties. He ran for re-election and won.

Smith's 2024 committee assignments are as follows:

- Joint Ways and Means Committee, Co-Vice Chair
- Joint Ways and Means Subcommittee on General Government, Co-Chair
- Joint Ways and Means Subcommittee on Capital Construction
- Joint Legislative Administration Committee
- House Revenue Committee
- Joint Emergency Board
- Joint Emergency Board Subcommittee on General Government, Co-Chair

During his terms in office, Smith has earned a 100% voting record with the Taxpayer Association of Oregon, Oregon Gun Owners of America, Oregon Farm Bureau, Oregonians for Food and Shelter, and the National Federation of Independent Business. The Oregon Cattlemen's Association has given Smith the "Lariat Laureate", their highest award. The Oregon Fair Association has given Smith the title "Grand Champion Legislator" for the work he has done on their behalf. He has also received the "Outstanding Freshman Legislator of the Year" award during the 19th Annual Oregon Rural Health Conference. The NRA Political Victory Fund has consistently given Smith an A+ grade on his votes regarding gun-related legislation. In 2009, Associated Oregon Industries named Smith "A Champion for Oregon Jobs and Business."

In January 2025, the Oregon Government Ethics Commission voted to investigate Smith over a possible failure to disclose a major source of household income. Smith said he misunderstood the law and updated his client list after the commission began its review.

In February 2025, the United States Department of Defense suspended a $800,000 grant to the CDA after finding a funding request had false information about Smith's raise. In response, Republican politician Kerry McQuisten called for Smith to resign.

== Personal life ==
Smith resides in Heppner with his wife Sherri and their five children. He is a member of The Church of Jesus Christ of Latter-day Saints.

== Political positions ==
Following the Standoff at Eagle Pass, Smith signed a letter in support of Texas Governor Greg Abbott's decision in the conflict.

== Electoral history ==
Greg Smith General Electoral Results 2000–2018*
Year	Democrat	Votes	%	Republican	Votes	%
2024	No Candidate Filed			Greg Smith	19,728	97.60%
2022	No Candidate Filed			Greg Smith	17,384	97.40%
2020	Roland Ruhe	5,917	23.20%	Greg Smith	19,487	76.60%
2018	No Candidate Filed			Greg Smith	15,794	98.20%
2016	No Candidate Filed			Greg Smith	17,432	98.74%
2014	No Candidate Filed			Greg Smith	12,637	98.27%
2012	No Candidate Filed			Greg Smith	15,242	98.35%
2010	Jean A. Falbo	4,721	22.49%	Greg Smith	16,211	77.23%
2008	Jerome (Jerry) Sebestyen	7,186	30.25%	Greg Smith	16,504	69.48%
2006	Tonia P. St. Germain	6,058	29.95%	Greg Smith	14,119	69.81%
2004	No Candidate Filed			Greg Smith	20,876	98.08%
2002	Elizabeth Scheeler	6,382	32.80%	Greg Smith	13,025	66.95%
2000	Linda Harrington	7,676	30.71%	Greg Smith	17,283	69.15%

Greg Smith Primary Electoral Results 2000–2016*
Year	Republican	Votes	Pct	Republican	Votes	Pct
2010	Colleen MacLeod	2,864	36.78%	Greg Smith	4,905	62.99%

*All elections were for Oregon House of Representatives District 57 except for year 2000, which was for Oregon House District 59.
