= Oregon's 25th House district =

Legislative districts in the state of Oregon

Oregon's 25th House district after redistricting after the 2020 Census

District 25 of the Oregon House of Representatives is one of 60 House legislative districts in the state of Oregon. As of 2021, the district is contained entirely within Washington County and includes Tigard and parts of Durham and south Beaverton. The current representative for the district is Democrat Ben Bowman. He succeeded Republican Jessica George, who was appointed to replace Bill Post of Keizer.

== Election results ==
District boundaries have changed over time. Therefore, representatives before 2021 may not represent the same constituency as today. General election results from 2000 to present are as follows:

Year	Candidate	Party	Percent	Opponent	Party	Percent	Opponent	Party	Percent	Write-in percentage
2000	Carolyn Tomei	Democratic	58.52%	Dick Jones	Republican	41.48%	No third candidate			
2002 (Note: Vic Backlund was the incumbent in this election. He previously represented District 33, but was moved to this district due to redistricting following the 2000 United States census.)	Vic Backlund	Republican	74.46%	Jonathan Bella	Democratic	25.22%	No third candidate			0.32%
2004	Kim Thatcher	Republican	64.02%	Roger Pike	Democratic	35.98%	No third candidate			
2006	Kim Thatcher	Republican	57.02%	Charles Lee	Democratic	42.80%	No third candidate			0.18%
2008	Kim Thatcher	Republican	95.81%	Unopposed						4.19%
2010	Kim Thatcher	Republican	66.25%	Jim Dyer	Democratic	33.58%	No third candidate			0.17%
2012	Kim Thatcher	Republican	63.45%	Paul Holman	Democratic	33.72%	Ryan Haffner	Libertarian	2.66%	0.18%
2014	Bill Post	Republican	54.84%	Charles Lee	Independent	41.82%	Josh Smith	Pacific Green	3.12%	0.22%
2016	Bill Post	Republican	63.64%	Sharon Freeman	Democratic	36.12%	No third candidate			0.24%
2018	Bill Post	Republican	58.32%	Dave McCall	Democratic	41.56%	No third candidate			0.13%
2020	Bill Post	Republican	56.58%	Ramiro Navarro Jr.	Democratic	43.26%	No third candidate			0.16%
2022	Ben Bowman	Democratic	65.31%	Bob Niemeyer	Republican	34.52%	No third candidate			0.18%
2024	Ben Bowman	Democratic	67.6%	Bob Niemeyer	Republican	32.2%	No third candidate			0.2%

== See also ==
- Oregon Legislative Assembly
- Oregon House of Representatives
