= Oregon's 47th House district =

Legislative districts in the state of Oregon

Oregon's 47th House district after redistricting after the 2020 Census

District 47 of the Oregon House of Representatives is one of 60 House legislative districts in the state of Oregon. As of 2021, the district is located entirely within Multnomah County and includes much of East Portland. It was formerly represented by Democrat Diego Hernandez of Portland, who resigned in February 2021 amid an ethics scandal. It is now represented by Andrea Valderrama.

== Election results ==
District boundaries have changed over time. Therefore, representatives before 2021 may not represent the same constituency as today. General election results from 2000 to present are as follows:

Year	Candidate	Party	Percent	Opponent	Party	Percent	Opponent	Party	Percent	Write-ins percentage
2000	Joanne Verger	Democratic	71.70%	Christina Alexander	Pacific Green	28.30%	No third candidate			
2002 (Note: Jeff Merkley was the incumbent in this election. He previously represented District 16, but was moved to this district due to redistricting following the 2000 United States census.)	Jeff Merkley	Democratic	93.03%	Unopposed						6.97%
2004	Jeff Merkley	Democratic	64.65%	Frank Cleys	Republican	35.35%	No third candidate			
2006	Jeff Merkley	Democratic	63.97%	Bruce McCain	Republican	35.66%	No third candidate			0.37%
2008	Jefferson Smith	Democratic	96.57%	Unopposed						3.43%
2010	Jefferson Smith	Democratic	62.39%	Dee Flowers	Republican	37.30%	No third candidate			0.31%
2012	Jessica Vega Pederson	Democratic	64.84%	Maggie Nelson	Republican	34.68%	No third candidate			0.48%
2014	Jessica Vega Pederson	Democratic	95.36%	Unopposed						4.64%
2016	Diego Hernandez	Democratic	66.91%	Michael Langley	Independent	32.82%	No third candidate			0.27%
2018	Diego Hernandez	Democratic	95.98%	Unopposed						4.02%
2020	Diego Hernandez	Democratic	49.32%	Ryan Gardner	Republican	31.40%	Ashton Simpson	Working Families	19.05%	0.23%
2022	Andrea Valderrama (Note: Andrea Valderrama was the incumbent in this election. She was appointed on March 23, 2021 to replace Diego Hernandez, who resigned.)	Democratic	68.56%	Bill Stewart	Republican	31.23%	No third candidate			0.21%
2024	Andrea Valderrama	Democratic	95.5%	Unopposed						4.5%

== See also ==
- Oregon Legislative Assembly
- Oregon House of Representatives
