= Brian Clem =

American politician (born 1972)

Member of the Oregon House of Representatives from the 21st district
- In office January 8, 2007 – December 8, 2021
- Preceded by: Billy Dalto
- Succeeded by: Chris Hoy

Personal details
- Born: 1972 (age 53–54) Coos Bay, Oregon, U.S.
- Party: Democratic
- Education: Oregon State University

Brian L. Clem (born 1972) is an American politician who served as a member of the Oregon House of Representatives for the 21st district (largely from 2007 to 2021).

== Career ==
Claim was first elected to the House 2006, defeating incumbent Republican Billy Dalto. On July 6, 2009, Clem told the Oregonian newspaper that he was considering a run for governor of Oregon in 2010. However, he did not enter the race. In late-October 2021, he resigned from the legislature, stating he was going to take care of his mother who has Alzheimer's disease.

== Electoral history ==
2006 Oregon State Representative, 21st district
Party	Candidate	Votes	%
Democratic	Brian L. Clem	9,598	61.0
Republican	Billy Dalto	6,025	38.3
Write-in		101	0.6
Total votes		15,724	100%

2008 Oregon State Representative, 21st district
Party	Candidate	Votes	%
Democratic	Brian Clem	14,786	95.7
Write-in		660	4.3
Total votes		15,446	100%

2010 Oregon State Representative, 21st district
Party	Candidate	Votes	%
Democratic	Brian Clem	9,028	57.9
Republican	Marvin Sannes	6,494	41.7
Write-in		59	0.4
Total votes		15,581	100%

2012 Oregon State Representative, 21st district
Party	Candidate	Votes	%
Democratic	Brian Clem	11,542	59.0
Republican	Dan Farrington	7,227	36.9
Independent	Marvin Sannes	758	3.9
Write-in		51	0.3
Total votes		19,578	100%

2014 Oregon State Representative, 21st district
Party	Candidate	Votes	%
Democratic	Brian Clem	10,527	63.7
Republican	Beverly J Wright	5,865	35.5
Write-in		121	0.7
Total votes		16,513	100%

2016 Oregon State Representative, 21st district
Party	Candidate	Votes	%
Democratic	Brian Clem	12,313	55.5
Republican	Doug Rodgers	8,338	37.6
Independent	Alvin M Klausen Jr	1,420	6.4
Write-in		106	0.5
Total votes		22,177	100%

2018 Oregon State Representative, 21st district
Party	Candidate	Votes	%
Democratic	Brian Clem	13,440	63.5
Republican	Jack Esp	7,632	36.1
Write-in		92	0.4
Total votes		21,164	100%

2020 Oregon State Representative, 21st district
Party	Candidate	Votes	%
Democratic	Brian Clem	16,433	60.6
Republican	Jack Esp	10,610	39.1
Write-in		84	0.3
Total votes		27,127	100%
