= Oregon's 14th House district =

Legislative districts in the state of Oregon

Oregon's 14th House district after redistricting after the 2020 Census

District 14 of the Oregon House of Representatives is one of 60 House legislative districts in the state of Oregon. As of 2021, the boundary for the district is located entirely within Lane County and is composed of west Eugene, including the Eugene Airport and Bethel, Elmira, and Veneta. The current representative for the district is Democrat Julie Fahey of Eugene.

== Election results ==
District boundaries have changed over time. Therefore, representatives before 2021 may not represent the same constituency as today. General election results from 2000 to present are as follows:

Year	Candidate	Party	Percent	Opponent	Party	Percent	Opponent	Party	Percent	Write-in percentage
2000	Diane Rosenbaum	Democratic	87.67%	John McEnroe	Libertarian	12.33%	No third candidate			
2002	Pat Farr	Republican	52.90%	Araminta Hawkins	Democratic	47.08%	No third candidate			0.02%
2004	Debi Farr	Republican	52.63%	Bev Ficek	Democratic	47.37%	No third candidate			
2006	Chris Edwards	Democratic	52.25%	Debi Farr	Republican	47.75%	No third candidate			
2008	Chris Edwards	Democratic	97.03%	Unopposed						2.97%
2010 (Note: Val Hoyle was the incumbent in this election. She was appointed to this seat on September 23, 2009 to replace Chris Edwards, who resigned to take an appointment to the District 7 seat in the Oregon Senate.)	Val Hoyle	Democratic	50.35%	Dwight Coon	Republican	44.62%	Keith Prociw	Independent	4.81%	0.21%
2012	Val Hoyle	Democratic	54.29%	Dwight Coon	Republican	42.60%	Sharon Mahler	Libertarian	2.98%	0.14%
2014	Val Hoyle	Democratic	55.64%	Kathy Lamberg	Republican	43.94%	No third candidate			0.42%
2016	Julie Fahey	Democratic	51.85%	Kathy Lamberg	Republican	47.94%	No third candidate			0.21%
2018	Julie Fahey	Democratic	61.01%	Rich Cunningham	Republican	38.76%	No third candidate			0.23%
2020	Julie Fahey	Democratic	59.11%	Rich Cunningham	Republican	40.64%	No third candidate			0.25%
2022	Julie Fahey	Democratic	59.71%	Stan Stubblefield	Republican	40.09%	No third candidate			0.20%
2024	Julie Fahey	Democratic	94.1%	Unopposed						5.9%

== See also ==
- Oregon Legislative Assembly
- Oregon House of Representatives
