= Ron Noble =

American politician

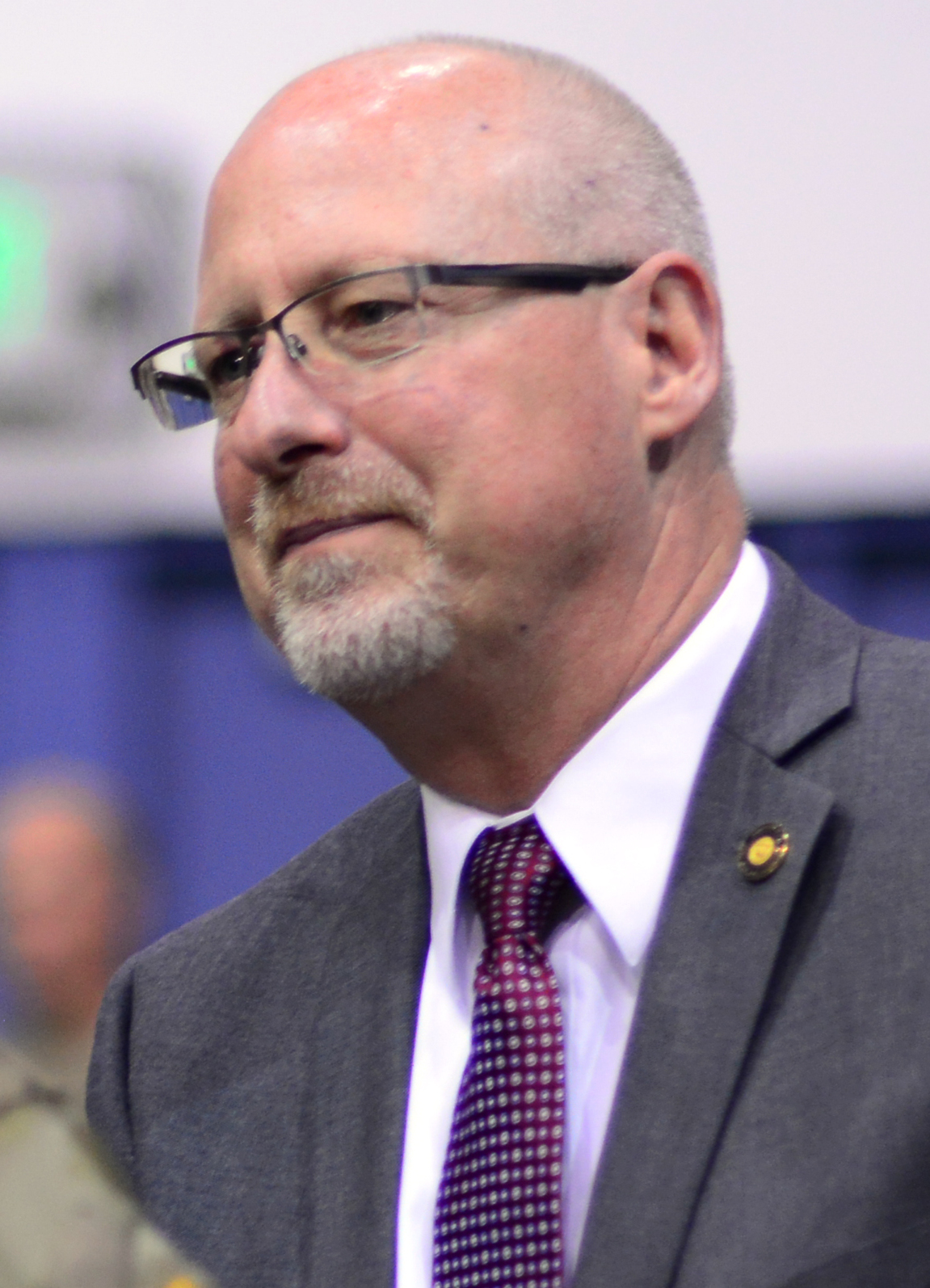

Member of the Oregon House of Representatives from the 24th district
- In office January 9, 2017 – January 9, 2023
- Preceded by: Jim Weidner
- Succeeded by: Lucetta Elmer

Personal details
- Born: January 25, 1960 (age 66) Lynwood, California, U.S.
- Party: Republican

Ron Noble (born January 25, 1960) is an American politician who served as a member of the Oregon House of Representatives for the 24th district, from 2017 to 2023.

== Early life and education ==
Noble was born in Lynwood, California, in 1960. He attended Oregon State University and Seattle Pacific University, but did not earn a degree.

== Career ==
Noble served in the Corvallis police department from 1988 until 2006 and as McMinnville chief of police from 2006 until 2014. Noble won election to the Oregon House of Representatives in 2016, defeating Democratic candidate Ken Moore with 55% of the vote.

== Personal life ==
Noble and his wife, Sue, have five children and nine grandchildren.

== Electoral history ==
2016 Oregon State Representative, 24th district
Party	Candidate	Votes	%
Republican	Ron Noble	17,070	54.9
Democratic	Ken Moore	13,958	44.9
Write-in		62	0.2
Total votes		31,090	100%

2018 Oregon State Representative, 24th district
Party	Candidate	Votes	%
Republican	Ron Noble	16,762	55.6
Democratic	Ken Moore	13,370	44.3
Write-in		32	0.1
Total votes		30,164	100%

2020 Oregon State Representative, 24th district
Party	Candidate	Votes	%
Republican	Ron Noble	21,427	57.6
Democratic	Lynnette Shaw	15,675	42.2
Write-in		72	0.2
Total votes		37,174	100%
