= Oregon's 24th House district =

Legislative districts in the state of Oregon

Oregon's 24th House district after redistricting after the 2020 Census

District 24 of the Oregon House of Representatives is one of 60 House legislative districts in the state of Oregon. As of 2021, the boundary for the district includes portions of Polk and Yamhill counties. The district includes McMinnville, Yamhill, Carlton, and Sheridan as well as the Grand Ronde Community. The current representative for the district is Republican Lucetta Elmer of McMinnville.

== Election results ==
District boundaries have changed over time. Therefore, representatives before 2021 may not represent the same constituency as today. General election results from 2000 to present are as follows:

Year	Candidate	Party	Percent	Opponent	Party	Percent	Opponent	Party	Percent	Opponent	Party	Percent	Write-in percentage
2000	Richard Devlin	Democratic	55.33%	Jim Hansen	Republican	44.67%	No third candidate			No fourth candidate			
2002 (Note: Donna Nelson was the incumbent in this election. She previously represented District 29, but was moved to this district due to redistricting following the 2000 United States census.)	Donna Nelson	Republican	59.28%	Tim Duerfeldt	Democratic	40.38%	No third candidate			No fourth candidate			0.34%
2004	Donna Nelson	Republican	52.94%	Tim Duerfeldt	Democratic	43.41%	Julie Dodge	Libertarian	2.00%	Brenda Nyhart	Constitution	1.64%	
2006	Donna Nelson	Republican	48.60%	Sal Peralta	Democratic	47.02%	David Terry	Libertarian	3.69%	No fourth candidate			0.69%
2008	Jim Weidner	Republican	54.26%	Bernt "Al" Hansen	Democratic	45.51%	No third candidate			No fourth candidate			0.23%
2010	Jim Weidner	Republican	54.79%	Susan Sokol Blosser	Democratic	45.21%	No third candidate			No fourth candidate			
2012	Jim Weidner	Republican	54.28%	Kathy Campbell	Democratic	43.39%	Kohler Johnson	Libertarian	2.23%	No fourth candidate			0.10%
2014	Jim Weidner	Republican	51.12%	Ken Moore	Democratic	45.88%	Kohler Johnson	Libertarian	2.82%	No fourth candidate			0.17%
2016	Ron Noble	Republican	54.91%	Ken Moore	Democratic	44.90%	No third candidate			No fourth candidate			0.20%
2018	Ron Noble	Republican	55.57%	Ken Moore	Democratic	44.32%	No third candidate			No fourth candidate			0.11%
2020	Ron Noble	Republican	57.64%	Lynnette Shaw	Democratic	42.17%	No third candidate			No fourth candidate			0.19%
2022	Lucetta Elmer	Republican	56.23%	Victoria Ernst	Democratic	43.63%	No third candidate			No fourth candidate			0.14%
2024	Lucetta Elmer	Republican	59.6%	Lisa Pool	Democratic	40.2%	No third candidate			No fourth candidate			0.2%

== See also ==
- Oregon Legislative Assembly
- Oregon House of Representatives
