= Parkrose School District =

School district in Portland, Oregon

The Parkrose School District is in Portland, Oregon. The district contains four elementary schools, a middle school, and a high school. It is a K–12 district with an enrollment of approximately 3,300 students as of 2016.

The district includes sections of Portland and all of Maywood Park.

== History ==
The school district originated in 1885 as a one-room schoolhouse, though the district's name at that time was informal. The district slowly grew - first into several classrooms, and later several buildings. In November 2005 the school district had 3,505 students enrolled.

== Demographics ==
In the 2009 school year, the district had 199 students classified as homeless by the Department of Education, or 5.6% of students in the district.

== Schools ==
- Parkrose High School, Molly Ouche, Principal
- Parkrose Middle School, Annette Sweeney, Principal
- Sacramento Elementary, Megan Filiault, Principal
- Russell Elementary, Samantha Regaisus, Principal
- Shaver Elementary, Jessica Stewart Keys, Principal
- Prescott Elementary, Stephen Shepherd, Principal

== See also ==
- List of school districts in Oregon
