= Diego Hernandez (politician) =

American politician (born 1986/87)

Member of the Oregon House of Representatives from the 47th district
- In office January 9, 2017 – March 15, 2021
- Preceded by: Jessica Vega Pederson
- Succeeded by: Andrea Valderrama

Member of the Reynolds School District Board
- In office 2013–2021
- Preceded by: Position established
- Succeeded by: Spencer Chao

Personal details
- Born: 1986 or 1987 (age 38–39) Oregon
- Party: Democratic
- Education: University of Oregon; Portland State University

Diego Hernandez (born 1986/87) is an American Democratic politician who served in the Oregon House of Representatives from 2017 to 2021. He represented the 47th district, which covers parts of east Portland.

== Biography ==
Hernandez graduated from Reynolds High School in Troutdale, and graduated with a bachelor's degree from the University of Oregon and with a master's degree from Portland State University. He became a teacher and was elected to the Reynolds School District Board in 2012, becoming its first Hispanic member, on which he still serves despite being elected to the House. Hernandez was appointed to the Oregon Commission on Hispanic Affairs in 2014.

Hernandez was elected to the House in 2016 to succeed the retiring Jessica Vega Pederson, defeating Independent Party of Oregon candidate Michael Langley with 67% of the vote.

In 2020 Hernandez was accused of sexual harassment by seven women, prompting calls for his resignation from then House Speaker Tina Kotek and other Democrats. On May 4, 2020 the interim House Conduct Committee required Hernandez to provide 24-hours’ notice before entering the Capitol and ordered no contact with his accusers. Facing the possibility of being the first legislator ever expelled from the Oregon House, Hernandez announced his resignation on February 22, 2021, which took effect on March 15, 2021.

== Personal life ==
Hernandez, who was 29 at the time of election, was the youngest person serving in the Oregon legislature. He is unmarried. He is now using the alias "Juan Hernandez".

== Electoral history ==
2016 Oregon State Representative, 47th district
Party	Candidate	Votes	%
Democratic	Diego Hernandez	14,323	66.9
Independent	Michael P Langley	7,025	32.8
Write-in		58	0.3
Total votes		21,406	100%

2018 Oregon State Representative, 47th district
Party	Candidate	Votes	%
Democratic	Diego Hernandez	14,741	96.0
Write-in		618	4.0
Total votes		15,359	100%

2020 Oregon State Representative, 47th district
Party	Candidate	Votes	%
Democratic	Diego Hernandez	13,631	49.3
Republican	Ryan Gardner	8,677	31.4
Working Families	Ashton Simpson	5,264	19.0
Write-in		64	0.2
Total votes		27,636	100%
