= Oregon's 57th House district =

Legislative districts in the state of Oregon

Oregon's 57th House district after redistricting after the 2020 Census

District 57 of the Oregon House of Representatives is one of 60 House legislative districts in the state of Oregon. As of 2021, the boundary for the district includes all of Gilliam, Morrow, Sherman, and Wheeler counties and portions of Clackamas, Jefferson, Marion, Umatilla and Wasco counties. The district includes Mt. Jefferson and the Warm Springs Indian Reservation. The current representative for the district is Republican Greg Smith of Heppner.

== Election results ==
District boundaries have changed over time; therefore, representatives before 2021 may not represent the same constituency as today. General election results from 2000 to present are as follows:

Year	Candidate	Party	Percent	Opponent	Party	Percent	Write-in percentage
2000	Bob Jenson	Republican	100.00%	Unopposed			
2002 (Note: Greg Smith was the incumbent in this election. He previously represented District 59, but was moved to this district due to redistricting following the 2000 United States census.)	Greg Smith	Republican	66.96%	Elizabeth Scheeler	Democratic	32.81%	0.24%
2004	Greg Smith	Republican	98.08%	Unopposed			1.92%
2006	Greg Smith	Republican	69.83%	Tonia St. Germain	Democratic	29.94%	0.22%
2008	Greg Smith	Republican	69.48%	Jerry Sebestyen	Democratic	30.25%	0.27%
2010	Greg Smith	Republican	77.25%	Jean Falbo	Democratic	22.48%	0.27%
2012	Greg Smith	Republican	98.37%	Unopposed			1.63%
2014	Greg Smith	Republican	98.27%	Unopposed			1.73%
2016	Greg Smith	Republican	98.74%	Unopposed			1.26%
2018	Greg Smith	Republican	98.20%	Unopposed			1.80%
2020	Greg Smith	Republican	76.56%	Roland Ruhe	Democratic	23.25%	0.19%
2022	Greg Smith	Republican	97.44%	Unopposed			2.56%
2024	Greg Smith	Republican	97.60%	Unopposed			2.40%

== See also ==
- Oregon Legislative Assembly
- Oregon House of Representatives
