= Oregon's 21st House district =

Legislative districts in the state of Oregon

Oregon's 21st House district after redistricting after the 2020 Census

District 21 of the Oregon House of Representatives is one of 60 House legislative districts in the state of Oregon. As of 2021, the district is contained entirely within Marion County and covers Keizer and downtown Salem, including the Oregon State Capitol. The current representative for the district is Republican Kevin Mannix of Salem.

== Election results ==
District boundaries have changed over time. Therefore, representatives before 2021 may not represent the same constituency as today. General election results from 2000 to present are as follows:

Year	Candidate	Party	Percent	Opponent	Party	Percent	Opponent	Party	Percent	Write-in percentage
2000	Randy Leonard	Democratic	100.00%	Unopposed						
2002	Billy Dalto	Republican	52.51%	Mike Swaim	Democratic	46.94%	No third candidate			0.54%
2004	Billy Dalto	Republican	52.23%	Claudia Howells	Democratic	47.77%	No third candidate			
2006	Brian Clem	Democratic	61.08%	Billy Dalto	Republican	38.27%	No third candidate			0.65%
2008	Brian Clem	Democratic	95.73%	Unopposed						4.27%
2010	Brian Clem	Democratic	57.88%	Marvin Sannes	Republican	41.74%	No third candidate			0.37%
2012	Brian Clem	Democratic	57.88%	Dan Farrington	Republican	36.91%	Marvin Sannes	Independent	3.87%	0.26%
2014	Brian Clem	Democratic	63.75%	Beverly Wright	Republican	35.52%	No third candidate			0.73%
2016	Brian Clem	Democratic	55.52%	Doug Rodgers	Republican	37.60%	Alvin Klausen	Independent	6.40%	0.48%
2018	Brian Clem	Democratic	63.50%	Jack Esp	Republican	36.06%	No third candidate			0.43%
2020	Brian Clem	Democratic	60.58%	Jack Esp	Republican	39.11%	No third candidate			0.31%
2022	Kevin Mannix	Republican	51.38%	Ramiro Navarro, Jr.	Democratic	45.63%	Michael Morrow	Libertarian	2.89%	0.10%
2024	Kevin Mannix	Republican	51.8%	Virginia Stapleton	Democratic	48.0%	No third candidate			0.20%

== See also ==
- Oregon Legislative Assembly
- Oregon House of Representatives
