= Maywood Park, Oregon =

- City
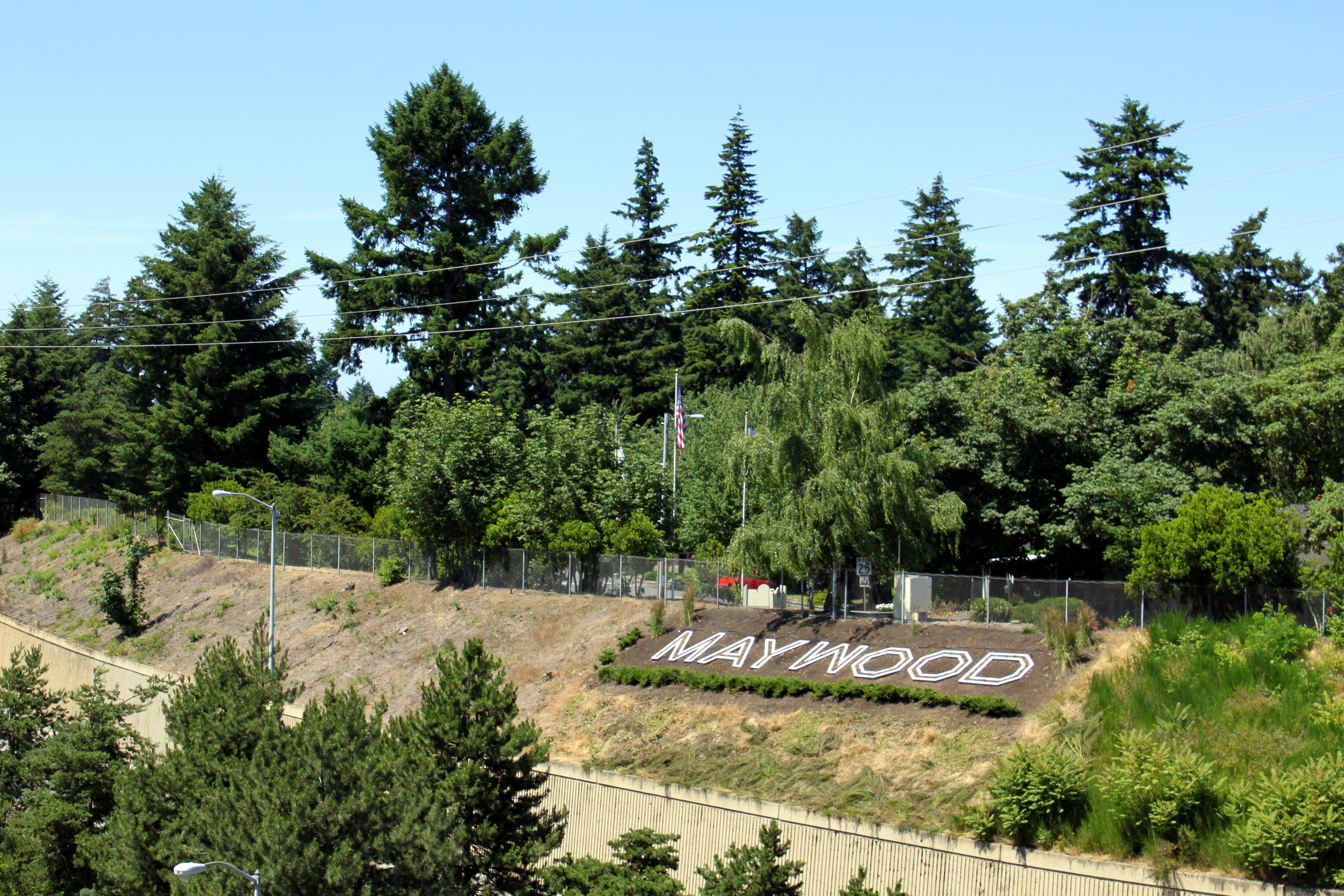
- Hillside letters for Maywood Park

- Flag Seal
- Interactive map of Maywood Park, Oregon
- Location within Oregon
- Coordinates: 45.5525°N 122.5618°W
- Country: United States
- State: Oregon
- County: Multnomah
- First plotted: 1926
- Incorporated: August 1, 1967

Government
  - Type: Mayor–Council
  - Mayor: Jim Akers
  - President: Kevin Bussema
  - Forester: Ben Harrison
  - Councilmembers: Jeff Baltzell; Miriam Berman; Thomas Welander

Area
  - Total: 0.173 sq mi (0.447 km^{2})
  - Land: 0.173 sq mi (0.447 km^{2})
  - Water: 0 sq mi (0.000 km^{2}) 0.00%
- Elevation: 157 ft (48 m)

Population (2020)
  - Total: 829
  - Estimate (2025): 808
  - Density: 4,800/sq mi (1,850/km^{2})
- Time zone: UTC–8 (Pacific (PST))
  - Summer (DST): UTC–7 (PDT)
- ZIP Code: 97220
- Area codes: 503 and 971
- FIPS code: 41-46730
- GNIS feature ID: 2411055
- Highway: I-205
- Website: cityofmaywoodpark.com

Maywood Park is a city in Multnomah County, Oregon, United States. An enclave within the city of Portland, the residents of the city voted to incorporate in 1967 in an unsuccessful attempt to stop the construction of Interstate 205. The population was 829 as of the 2020 census, and was estimated at 808 in 2025.

== History ==
In 1926, Columbia Realty purchased the triangular plot of land on which Maywood Park stands. The parcel was later purchased by Commonwealth Inc., which made plans to create a subdivision modeled after the Laurelhurst and Eastmoreland neighborhoods of Portland. Although the Great Depression delayed development of the land, construction was largely completed by 1943 with about 400 homes. Maywood Park was so large it crossed over where I-205 is today.

In 1967, the residents of Maywood Park voted to incorporate as a city in an attempt to prevent Interstate 205 from cutting through the neighborhood. Although the effort was ultimately unsuccessful, resulting in the loss of 82 homes on the west side, Maywood Park was able to gain noise reduction concessions from the construction of I-205. Specifically, I-205 is built below grade as it passes by Maywood Park, and a sound wall and green belt provide further noise reduction.

== Geography ==
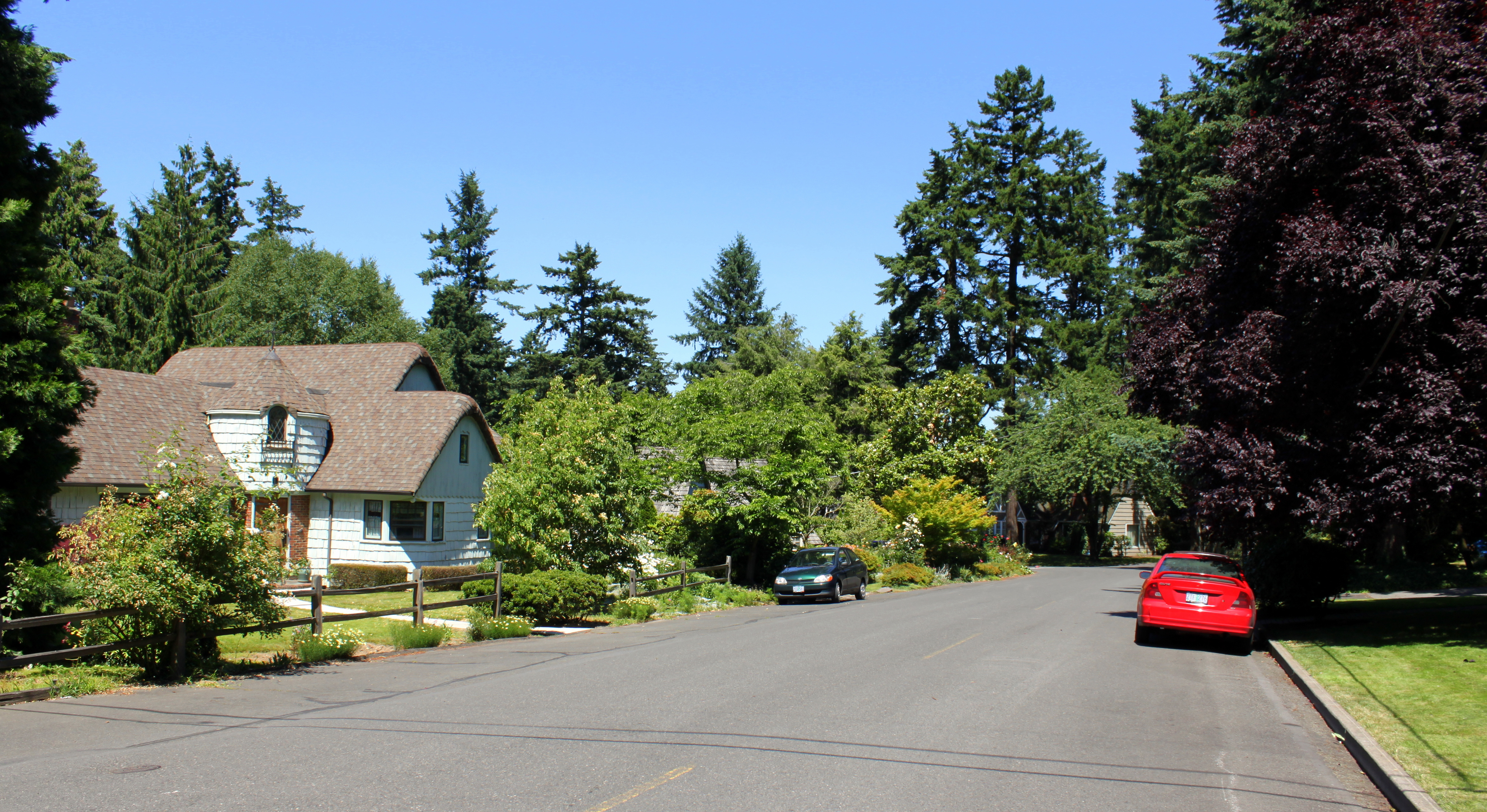
A street in Maywood Park

According to the United States Census Bureau, the city has a total area of 0.172 square miles (0.45 km^{2}), all land.

The city is contained in a trapezoid bordered by NE Prescott Street to the north, NE 102nd Avenue to the east, I-205 to the south, and NE 92nd Avenue (across I-205) to the west, plus the eastern side of 92nd Avenue to Sandy Boulevard.

== Demographics ==
Historical population
Census	Pop.	Note	%±
1970	1,305		—
1980	1,083		−17.0%
1990	781		−27.9%
2000	777		−0.5%
2010	752		−3.2%
2020	829		10.2%
2025 (est.)	808		−2.5%
U.S. Decennial Census; 2020 Census

According to realtor website Zillow, the average price of a home as of August 31, 2026, in Maywood Park was $516,984.

As of the 2024 American Community Survey, there were 352 estimated households in Maywood Park with an average of 2.80 persons per household. The city has a median household income of $141,458. Approximately 4.5% of the city's population lives at or below the poverty line. Maywood Park has an estimated 64.5% employment rate, with 46.5% of the population holding a bachelor's degree or higher and 98.8% holding a high school diploma. There were 362 housing units at an average density of 0 per square mile (0.00/km^{2}).

The top five reported languages (people were allowed to report up to two languages, thus the figures will generally add to more than 100%) were English (94.2%), Spanish (2.9%), Indo-European (1.0%), Asian and Pacific Islander (1.7%), and Other (0.3%).

The median age in the city was 42.6 years.

Maywood Park, Oregon – racial and ethnic composition Note: the US Census treats Hispanic/Latino as an ethnic category. This table excludes Latinos from the racial categories and assigns them to a separate category. Hispanics/Latinos may be of any race.
Race / ethnicity (NH = non-Hispanic)	Pop. 2000	Pop. 2010	Pop. 2020	% 2000	% 2010	% 2020
White alone (NH)	676	627	631	87.00%	83.38%	76.12%
Black or African American alone (NH)	16	26	22	2.06%	3.46%	2.65%
Native American or Alaska Native alone (NH)	7	2	0	0.90%	0.27%	0.00%
Asian alone (NH)	31	44	58	3.99%	5.85%	7.00%
Pacific Islander alone (NH)	1	1	0	0.13%	0.13%	0.00%
Other race alone (NH)	0	0	5	0.00%	0.00%	0.60%
Mixed race or multiracial (NH)	28	22	40	3.60%	2.93%	4.83%
Hispanic or Latino (any race)	18	30	73	2.32%	3.99%	8.81%
Total	777	752	829	100.00%	100.00%	100.00%

=== 2020 census ===
As of the 2020 census, there were 829 people, 304 households, and 225 families residing in the city. The population density was 4,819.77 inhabitants per square mile (1,860.92/km^{2}). There were 312 housing units at an average density of 1,813.95 per square mile (700.37/km^{2}). The racial makeup of the city was 79.13% White, 2.65% African American, 0.36% Native American, 7.00% Asian, 0.00% Pacific Islander, 2.29% from some other races and 8.56% from two or more races. Hispanic or Latino people of any race were 8.81% of the population.

=== 2010 census ===
As of the 2010 census, there were 752 people, 300 households, and 217 families residing in the city. The population density was 4,372.09 inhabitants per square mile (1,688.07/km^{2}). There were 312 housing units at an average density of 1,813.95 per square mile (700.37/km^{2}). The racial makeup of the city was 85.51% White, 3.46% African American, 0.40% Native American, 5.85% Asian, 0.13% Pacific Islander, 0.66% from some other races and 3.99% from two or more races. Hispanic or Latino people of any race were 3.99% of the population.

There were 300 households, of which 30.3% had children under the age of 18 living with them, 55.7% were married couples living together, 11.7% had a female householder with no husband present, 5.0% had a male householder with no wife present, and 27.7% were non-families. 21.7% of all households were made up of individuals, and 7.6% had someone living alone who was 65 years of age or older. The average household size was 2.51 and the average family size was 2.82.

The median age in the city was 42.8 years. 20.6% of residents were under the age of 18; 5.1% were between the ages of 18 and 24; 28.9% were from 25 to 44; 29.9% were from 45 to 64; and 15.7% were 65 years of age or older. The gender makeup of the city was 47.7% male and 52.3% female.

=== 2000 census ===
As of the 2000 census, there were 777 people, 306 households, and 224 families residing in the city. The population density was 4,571.45 inhabitants per square mile (1,765.05/km^{2}). There were 314 housing units at an average density of 1,847.41 per square mile (713.29/km^{2}). The racial makeup of the city was 88.42% White, 2.06% African American, 0.90% Native American, 3.99% Asian, 0.13% Pacific Islander, 0.39% from some other races and 4.12% from two or more races. Hispanic or Latino people of any race were 2.32% of the population.

There were 306 households, out of which 27.8% had children under the age of 18 living with them, 60.1% were married couples living together, 9.5% had a female householder with no husband present, and 26.5% were non-families. 20.9% of all households were made up of individuals, and 9.5% had someone living alone who was 65 years of age or older. The average household size was 2.54 and the average family size was 2.92.

In the city, the population was spread out, with 20.2% under the age of 18, 6.2% from 18 to 24, 25.7% from 25 to 44, 32.8% from 45 to 64, and 15.1% who were 65 years of age or older. The median age was 44 years. For every 100 females, there were 92.8 males. For every 100 females age 18 and over, there were 90.2 males.

The median income for a household in the city was $56,250, and the median income for a family was $61,750. Males had a median income of $39,821 versus $36,071 for females. The per capita income for the city was $26,472. None of the families and 1.7% of the population were living below the poverty line, including no under eighteens and 1.7% of those over 64.

== Education ==
The city is served by the Parkrose School District No. 3 and lies within the Mt. Hood Community College District.

== See also ==
- Mount Hood Freeway, a freeway revolt related to the development of I-205
