= 69th Oregon Legislative Assembly =

←	68th Legislative Assembly	70th Legislative Assembly	→
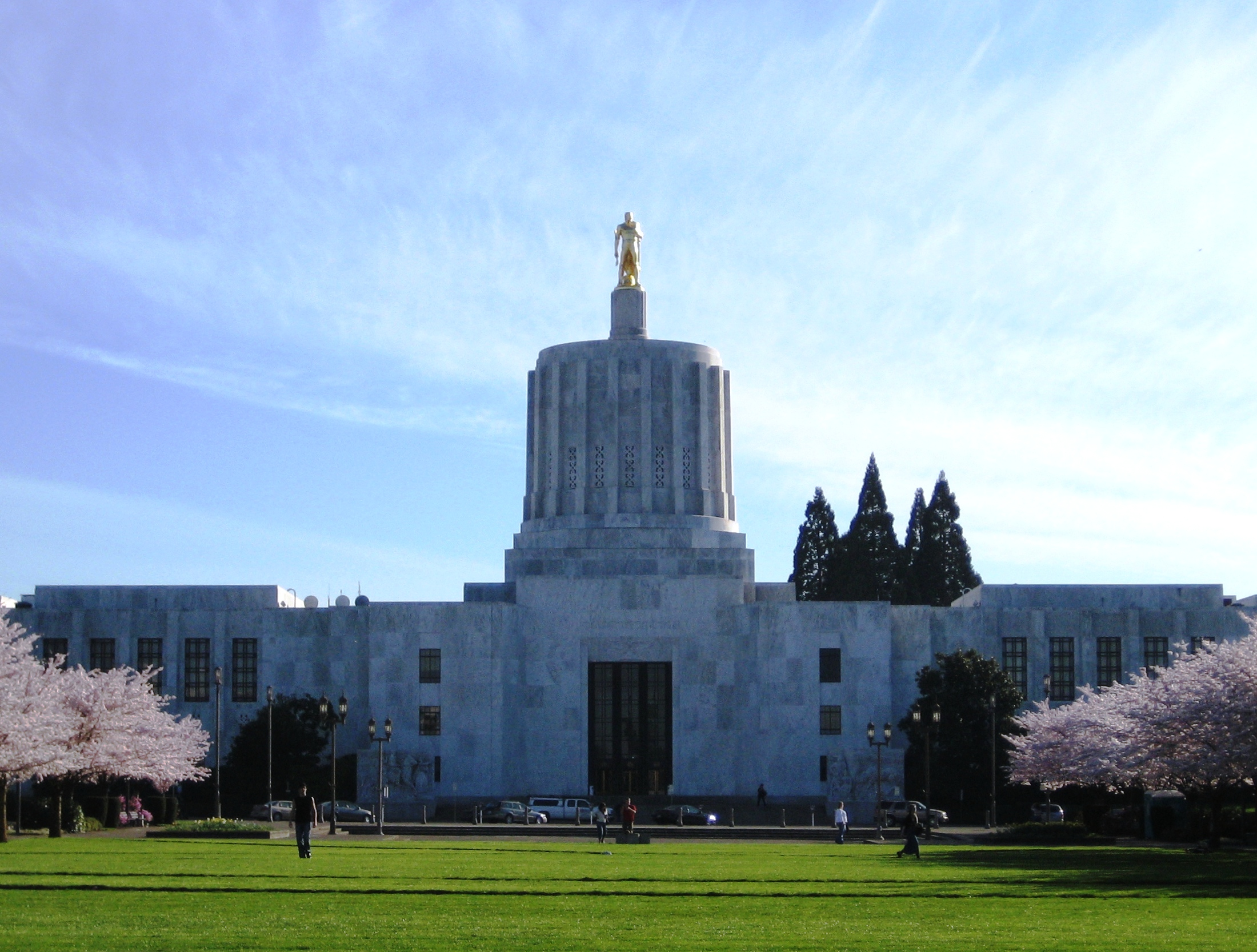
- The legislature took place in the Oregon State Capitol, seen here in 2007

Overview
- Legislative body: Oregon Legislative Assembly
- Jurisdiction: Oregon, United States
- Meeting place: Oregon State Capitol
- Term: 1997
- Website: www.oregonlegislature.gov

Oregon State Senate
- Members: 30 Senators
- Senate President: Brady L. Adams (R)
- Majority Leader: Gene Derfler (R)
- Minority Leader: Cliff Trow (D)
- Party control: Republican Party of Oregon

Oregon House of Representatives
- Members: 60 Representatives
- Speaker of the House: Lynn Lundquist (R)
- Majority Leader: Lynn Snodgrass (R)
- Minority Leader: Peter Courtney (D)
- Party control: Republican Party of Oregon

The 69th Oregon Legislative Assembly was the legislative session of the Oregon Legislative Assembly that convened on January 13, 1997, and adjourned July 5 the same year.

== Senate ==
Affiliation	Members
Democratic	9
Republican	21
Total	30
Government Majority	12

Peter Sorenson resigned January 5, 1997 and Susan Castillo was sworn in January 17 the same year to replace him. Both were Democrats. Bill Kennemer resigned January 15, 1997 and Verne Duncan was sworn on February 17, 1997, to replace him. Both were Republicans.

== Senate Members ==
Composition of the Senate
District	Senator	Party
1	Joan Dukes	Democratic
2	Gary George	Republican
3	Tom Hartung	Republican
4	Eileen Qutub	Republican
5	Jeannette Hamby	Republican
6	Ginny Burdick	Democratic
7	Kate Brown	Democratic
8	Thomas Wilde	Democratic
9	Randy Leonard	Democratic
10	Avel Gordly	Democratic
11	John Lim	Republican
12	Verne Duncan, Bill Kennemer	Republican
13	Randy Miller	Republican
14	Ken Baker	Republican
15	Marylin Shannon	Republican
16	Gene Derfler (Majority Leader)	Republican
17	Shirley Stull	Republican
18	Clifford W. Trow (Minority Leader)	Republican
19	Mae Yih	Democratic
20	Susan Castillo, Pete Sorenson	Democratic
21	Bill Dwyer	Democratic
22	Bob Kintigh	Republican
23	Bill Fisher	Republican
24	Veral Tarno	Republican
25	Brady L. Adams (President)	Republican
26	Lenn Lamar Hannon	Republican
27	Neil Bryant	Republican
28	Ted Ferrioli	Republican
29	David Nelson	Republican
30	Gene Timms	Republican

== House ==
Affiliation	Members
Democratic	29
Republican	31
Total	60
Government Majority	2

Bob Repine resigned January 7, 1998. Carl Wilson was appointed on February 9, 1998, to fill the vacancy. Both were Republican. Bob Jenson changed from Democrat to Independent on February 27, 1998.

Bob Jenson is the only Oregon legislator who has served with a different party affiliation for each of his three terms. First, serving as a Democrat in 1977, then as an independent in 1999 and, finally, as a Republican in 2001.

== House Members ==
Composition of the House
District	House Member	Party
1	Jackie Taylor	Democratic
2	Timothy E Josi	Democratic
3	Charles Starr	Republican
4	Terry Thompson	Democratic
5	Jim Hill	Republican
6	Ken Strobeck	Republican
7	Chuck Carpenter	Republican
8	Ryan Deckert	Democratic
9	Tom Brian	Republican
10	Lynn Snodgrass (Majority Leader)	Republican
11	Anitra Rasmussen	Democratic
12	Chris Beck	Democratic
13	Dan Gardner	Democratic
14	George Eighmey	Democratic
15	Randall Edwards	Democratic
16	Frank Shields	Democratic
17	Mike Fahey	Democratic
18	Margaret L. Carter	Democratic
19	Jo Ann Hardesty	Democratic
20	John Minnis	Republican
21	Lonnie J. Roberts	Democratic
22	Ron Sunseri	Republican
23	Kurt Schrader	Democratic
24	Richard Devlin	Democratic
25	Jane Lokan	Republican
26	Larry Sowa	Democratic
27	Ron Adams	Republican
28	Roger Beyer	Republican
29	Leslie Lewis	Republican
30	Larry Wells	Republican
31	Bryan Johnston	Democratic
32	Tom Whelan	Democratic
33	Peter Courtney (Minority Leader)	Democratic
34	Lane Shetterly	Republican
35	Barbara Ross	Democratic
36	Carolyn Oakley	Republican
37	Liz VanLeeuwen	Republican
38	Patti Milne	Republican
39	Kitty Piercy	Democratic
40	Floyd Prozanski	Democratic
41	Cynthia Wooten	Republican
42	Lee Beyer	Democratic
43	Jim Welsh	Republican
44	Tony Corcoran	Democratic
45	Jeff Kruse	Republican
46	Bill Markham	Republican
47	Mike Lehman	Democratic
48	Ken Messerle	Republican
49	Bob Repine Carl Wilson	Republican
50	John Watt	Republican
51	Eldon Johnson	Republican
52	Judy Uherbelau	Democratic
53	Steve Harper	Republican
54	Dennis Luke	Republican
55	Ben Westlund	Democratic
56	Bob Montgomery	Republican
57	Bob Jenson	Democratic
58	Mark Simmons	Republican
59	Lynn Lundquist (Speaker)	Republican
60	Denny Jones	Republican
