= 68th Oregon Legislative Assembly =

Term of state legislature in Oregon, US

←	67th Legislative Assembly	69th Legislative Assembly	→
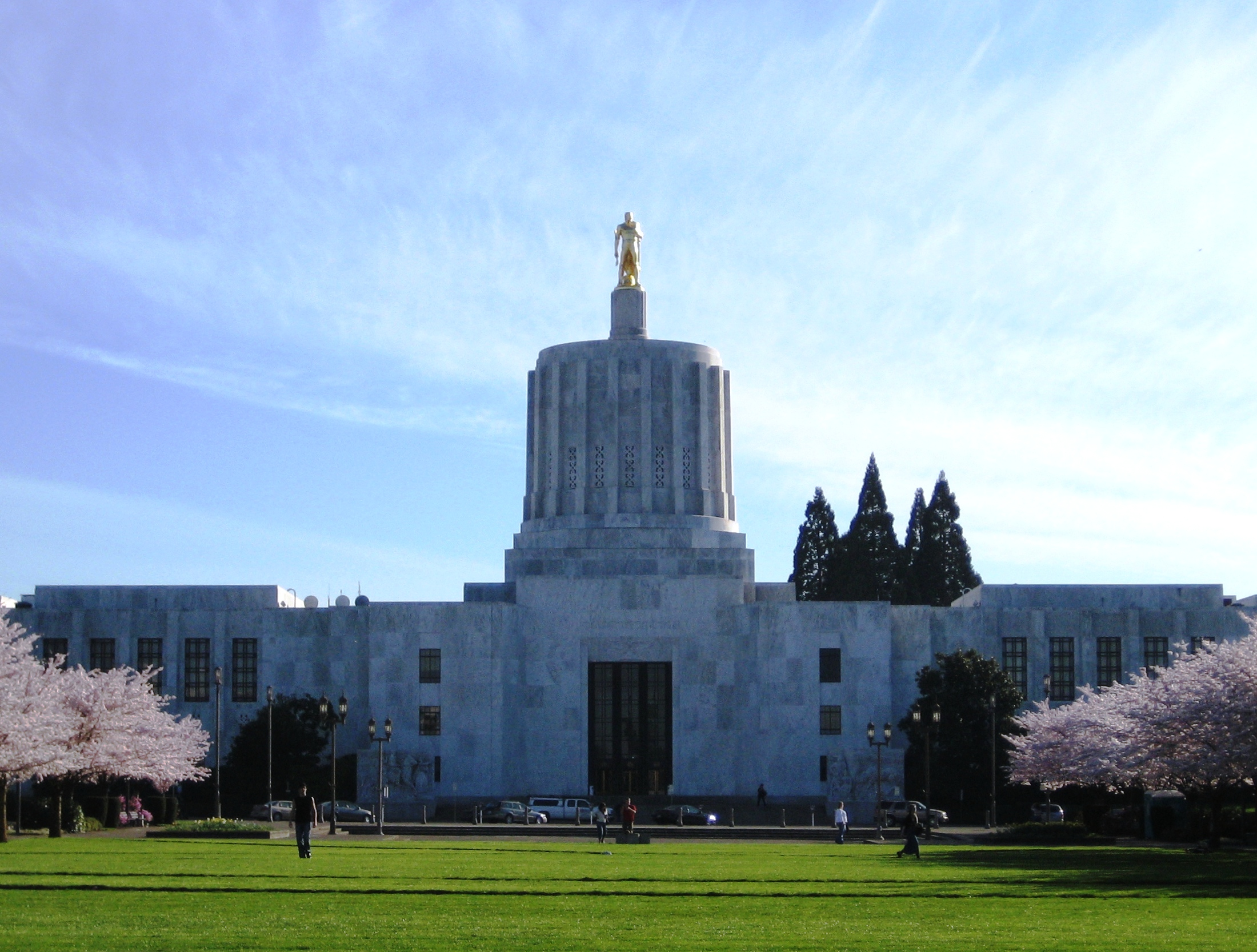
- The legislature took place in the Oregon State Capitol, seen here in 2007

Overview
- Legislative body: Oregon Legislative Assembly
- Jurisdiction: Oregon, United States
- Meeting place: Oregon State Capitol
- Term: 1995
- Website: www.oregonlegislature.gov

Oregon State Senate
- Members: 30 Senators
- Senate President: Gordon Smith (R)
- Majority Leader: Brady Adams (R)
- Minority Leader: Dick Springer (D)
- Party control: Republican Party of Oregon

Oregon House of Representatives
- Members: 60 Representatives
- Speaker of the House: Bev Clarno (R)
- Majority Leader: Ray Baum (R)
- Minority Leader: Peter Courtney (D)
- Party control: Republican Party of Oregon

The 68th Oregon Legislative Assembly was the legislative session of the Oregon Legislative Assembly that convened on January 9, 1995, and adjourned June 10 the same year.

== Senate ==
Affiliation	Members
Democratic	14
Republican	16
Total	30
Government Majority	2

Bill Bradbury resigned April 16, 1995, and Brenda Brecke replaced him the next day. They were both Democrats. Wes Cooley resigned January 3, 1995, and Greg Walden was sworn in 6 days later on January 9. They were both Republicans. Marylin Shannon was sworn on January 11, 1995, in replacement of Jim Bunn, who resigned January 3, 1995. They were both Republicans.

== Senate Members ==
Composition of the Senate
District	Senator	Party
1	Joan Dukes	Democratic
2	Stan Bunn	Democratic
3	Tom Hartung	Republican
4	Paul Phillips	Democratic
5	Jeannette Hamby	Democratic
6	Dick Springer (Minority Leader)	Democratic
7	Shirley Gold	Democratic
8	William McCoy	Democratic
9	Randy Leonard	Democratic
10	Ron Cease	Democratic
11	John Lim	Republican
12	Bill Kennemer	Republican
13	Randy Miller	Republican
14	Ken Baker	Republican
15	Marylin Shannon, Jim Bunn	Republican
16	Gene Derfler	Republican
17	Shirley Stull	Republican
18	Clifford W. Trow	Democratic
19	Mae Yih	Democratic
20	Pete Sorenson	Democratic
21	Bill Dwyer	Democratic
22	Bob Kintigh	Republican
23	Rod Johnson	Republican
24	Bill Bradbury, Brenda Brecke	Democratic
25	Brady L. Adams (Majority Leader)	Republican
26	Lenn Lamar Hannon	Republican
27	Neil Bryant	Republican
28	Wes Cooley, Greg Walden	Republican
29	Gordon H. Smith (President)	Republican
30	Gene Timms	Republican

== House ==
Affiliation	Members
Democratic	22
Republican	38
Total	60
Government Majority	16

Ray Baum resigned as Majority Leader on August 4, 1995. Lynn Lundquist was appointed Majority Leader on August 4, 1995, to fill the vacancy. Timothy Josi resigned on October 1, 1995, and was then reappointed on October 3, 1995. Tony Federici died while in office on August 30, 1995. Jackie Taylor was appointed on October 5, 1995, to fill the vacancy.

== House Members ==
Composition of the House
District	House Member	Party
1	Tony Federici, Jackie Taylor	Democratic
2	Timothy Josi	Democratic
3	Charles Starr	Republican
4	Terry Thompson	Democratic
5	John Meek	Republican
6	Ken Strobeck	Republican
7	Chuck Carpenter	Republican
8	Eileen Qutub	Republican
9	Tom Brian	Republican
10	Lynn Snodgrass	Republican
11	Anitra Rasmussen	Democratic
12	Gail Shibley	Democratic
13	Kate Brown	Democratic
14	George Eighmey	Democratic
15	Lisa Naito	Democratic
16	Frank Shields	Democratic
17	Michael Fahey	Democratic
18	Margaret Carter	Democratic
19	Avel Gordly	Democratic
20	John Minnis	Republican
21	Lonnie Roberts	Democratic
22	Sharon Wylie	Democratic
23	Jerry Grisham	Republican
24	Bob Tiernan	Republican
25	Jane Lokan	Republican
26	Larry Sowa	Democratic
27	Ron Adams	Republican
28	Cedric Ross Hayden	Republican
29	Leslie Lewis	Republican
30	Larry Wells	Republican
31	Bryan Johnston	Democratic
32	Kevin Leese Mannix	Democratic
33	Peter Courtney (Minority Leader)	Democratic
34	John Schoon	Republican
35	Barbara Ross	Democratic
36	Carolyn Oakley	Republican
37	Liz VanLeeuwen	Republican
38	Patti Milne	Republican
39	Kitty Piercy	Republican
40	Floyd Prozanski	Republican
41	Cynthia Wooten	Democratic
42	Lee Beyer	Democratic
43	Jim Welsh	Republican
44	Tony Corcoran	Democratic
45	Bill Fisher	Republican
46	Bill Markham	Republican
47	Mike Lehman	Democratic
48	Veral Tarno	Republican
49	Bob Repine	Republican
50	John Watt	Republican
51	Eldon Johnson	Republican
52	Judith Uherbelau	Democratic
53	Del Parks	Republican
54	Dennis Luke	Republican
55	Bev Clarno (Speaker)	Republican
56	Bob Montgomery	Republican
57	Charles R. Norris	Republican
58	Ray Baum (Majority Leader)	Republican
59	Lynn Lundquist (Majority Leader)	Republican
60	Denny Jones	Republican
