= 70th Oregon Legislative Assembly =

←	69th Legislative Assembly	71st Legislative Assembly	→
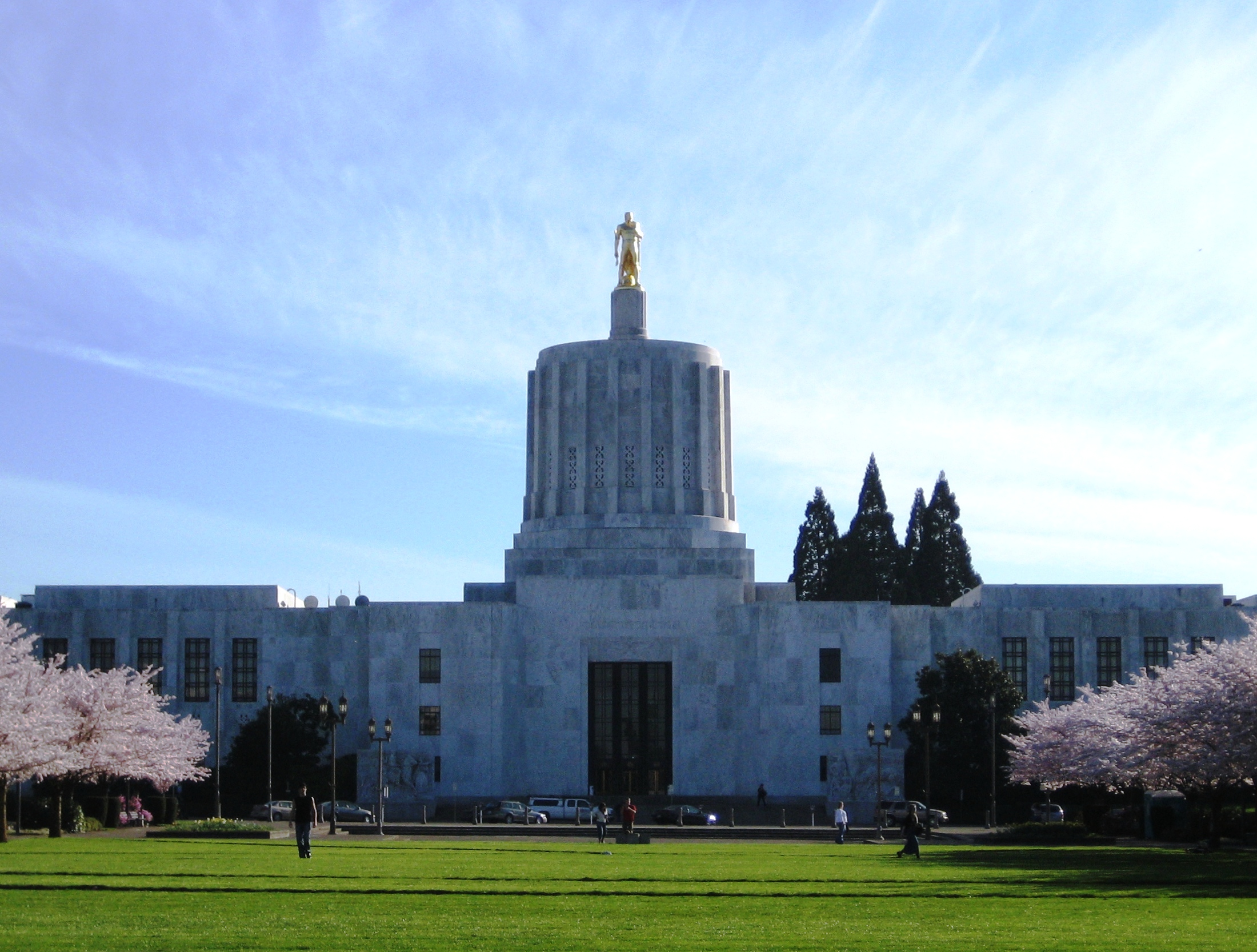
- The legislature took place in the Oregon State Capitol, seen here in 2007

Overview
- Legislative body: Oregon Legislative Assembly
- Jurisdiction: Oregon, United States
- Meeting place: Oregon State Capitol
- Term: 1999
- Website: www.oregonlegislature.gov

Oregon State Senate
- Members: 30 Senators
- Senate President: Brady Adams (R)
- Majority Leader: Gene Derfler (R)
- Minority Leader: Kate Brown (D)
- Party control: Republican Party of Oregon

Oregon House of Representatives
- Members: 60 Representatives
- Speaker of the House: Lynn Snodgrass (R)
- Majority Leader: Steve Harper (R)
- Minority Leader: Kitty Piercy (D)
- Party control: Republican Party of Oregon

The 70th Oregon Legislative Assembly was the legislative session of the Oregon Legislative Assembly that convened on January 11, 1999, and adjourned July 24, 1999.

== Senate ==
The senate was composed of 13 Democrats and 17 Republicans.

Affiliation	Members
Democratic	13
Republican	17
Total	30
Government Majority	4

== Senate Members ==
Composition of the Senate
District	Senator	Party
1	Joan Dukes	Democratic
2	Gary George	Republican
3	Tom Hartung	Republican
4	Eileen Qutub	Republican
5	Charles Starr	Republican
6	Ginny Burdick	Democratic
7	Kate Brown (Minority Leader)	Democratic
8	Thomas A Wilde	Democratic
9	Frank Shields	Democratic
10	Avel Gordly	Democratic
11	John Lim	Republican
12	Verne Duncan	Republican
13	Randy Miller	Republican
14	Rick Metsger	Democratic
15	Marylin Shannon	Republican
16	Gene Derfler (Majority Leader)	Republican
17	Peter Courtney	Democratic
18	Clifford W. Trow	Democratic
19	Mae Yih	Democratic
20	Susan Castillo	Democratic
21	Lee Beyer	Democratic
22	Tony Corcoran	Democratic
23	Bill Fisher	Republican
24	Veral Tarno	Republican
25	Brady Adams	Republican
26	Lenn Lamar Hannon	Republican
27	Neil Bryant	Republican
28	Ted Ferrioli	Republican
29	David Nelson	Republican
30	Gene Timms	Republican

== House ==
The house was composed of 32 Republicans, 27 Democrats, and Bob Jenson, who was Independent at the time of the election.

== House Members ==
Composition of the House
District	House Member	Party
1	Jaqueline Taylor	Democratic
2	Elaine Hopson	Democratic
3	Bruce Starr	Republican
4	Terry Thompson	Democratic
5	Jim Hill	Republican
6	Ken Strobeck	Republican
7	Bill Witt	Republican
8	Ryan Deckert	Democratic
9	Max Williams	Republican
10	Lynn Snodgrass (Speaker)	Republican
11	Anitra Rasmussen	Democratic
12	Chris Beck	Democratic
13	Dan Gardner	Democratic
14	Diane Rosenbaum	Democratic
15	Randall Edwards	Democratic
16	Jeff Merkley	Democratic
17	Gary Hansen	Democratic
18	Deborah Kafoury	Democratic
19	Jo Ann Hardesty	Democratic
20	Karen Minnis	Republican
21	Randy Leonard	Democratic
22	Ron Sunseri	Republican
23	Kurt Schrader	Democratic
24	Richard Devlin	Democratic
25	Jane Lokan	Republican
26	Kathy Lowe	Democratic
27	Jerry Krummel	Republican
28	Roger Beyer	Republican
29	Leslie Lewis	Republican
30	Larry Wells	Republican
31	Jackie Winters	Republican
32	Kevin Mannix	Democratic
33	Vic Backlund	Republican
34	Lane Shetterly	Republican
35	Barbara Ross	Democratic
36	Betsy Close	Republican
37	Jeff Kropf	Republican
38	Juley Gianella	Democratic
39	Kitty Piercy	Democratic
40	Floyd Prozanski	Democratic
41	Vicki Walker	Democratic
42	Bill Morrisette	Democratic
43	Jim Welsh	Republican
44	Al King	Democratic
45	Jeff Kruse	Republican
46	Susan Morgan	Republican
47	Mike Lehman	Democratic
48	Ken Messerle	Republican
49	Carl Wilson	Republican
50	Rob Patridge	Republican
51	Jason Atkinson	Republican
52	Judy Uherbelau	Democratic
53	Steve Harper (Majority Leader)	Republican
54	Tim Knopp	Republican
55	Ben Westlund	Republican
56	Bob Montgomery	Republican
57	Bob Jenson	Independent
58	Mark Simmons	Republican
59	Lynn Lundquist	Republican
60	Tom Butler	Republican
