= 67th Oregon Legislative Assembly =

←	66th Legislative Assembly	68th Legislative Assembly	→
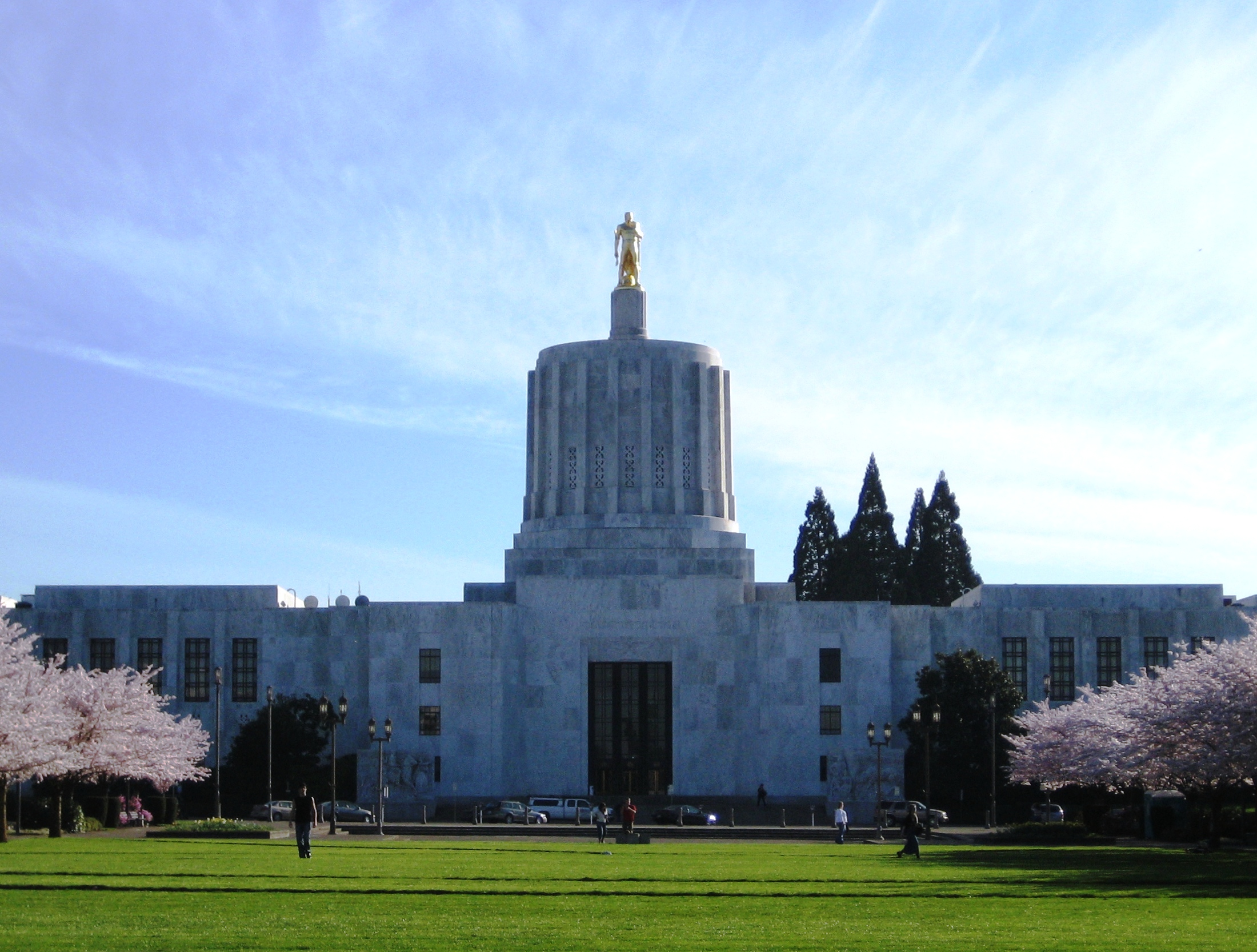
- The legislature took place in the Oregon State Capitol, seen here in 2007

Overview
- Legislative body: Oregon Legislative Assembly
- Jurisdiction: Oregon, United States
- Meeting place: Oregon State Capitol
- Term: 1993
- Website: www.oregonlegislature.gov

Oregon State Senate
- Members: 30 Senators
- Senate President: Bill Bradbury (D)
- Majority Leader: Dick Springer (D)
- Minority Leader: Gene Timms (R)
- Party control: Democratic Party of Oregon

Oregon House of Representatives
- Members: 60 Representatives
- Speaker of the House: Larry Campbell (R)
- Majority Leader: Greg Walden (R)
- Minority Leader: Peter Courtney (D)
- Party control: Republican Party of Oregon

The 67th Oregon Legislative Assembly was the legislative session of the Oregon Legislative Assembly that convened on January 11, 1993, and adjourned August 5 the same year.

== Senate ==
Affiliation	Members
Democratic	16
Republican	14
Total	30
Government Majority	2

Peg Jolin resigned on March 8, 1993; Karston Rasmussen was appointed to fill the vacancy.

== Senate Members ==
Composition of the Senate
District	Senator	Party
1	Joan Dukes	Democratic
2	Stan Bunn	Republican
3	Robert C. Shoemaker	Democratic
4	Paul Philips	Republican
5	Jeannette Hamby	Republican
6	Dick Springer (Majority Leader)	Democratic
7	Shirley Gold	Democratic
8	Bill McCoy	Democratic
9	Frank L. Roberts	Democratic
10	Ron Cease	Democratic
11	John Lim	Republican
12	Bill Kennemer	Republican
13	Joyce Cohen	Democratic
14	Bob Kintigh	Republican
15	James Lee Bunn	Republican
16	Catherine Webber	Democratic
17	Tricia Smith	Democratic
18	Clifford W. Trow	Democratic
19	Mae Yih	Democratic
20	Grattan Kerans	Democratic
21	Bill Dwyer	Democratic
22	Peg Jolin, Karston Rasmussen	Democratic
23	Rod Johnson	Republican
24	Bill Bradbury (President)	Democratic
25	Brady Adams	Republican
26	Lenn Lamar Hannon	Republican
27	Neil Bryant	Republican
28	Wes Cooley	Republican
29	Gordon H. Smith	Republican
30	Gene Timms (Minority Leader)	Republican

== House ==
Affiliation	Members
Democratic	27
Republican	33
Total	60
Government Majority	5

George Eighmey was appointed on May 10, 1993, to fill the vacancy of Beverly Stein, who resigned on April 21, 1993

== House Members ==
Composition of the House
District	House Member	Party
1	Tony Federici	Democratic
2	Timothy Josi	Republican
3	Charles Starr	Republican
4	Hedy Rijken	Democratic
5	John Meek	Republican
6	Delna Jones	Republican
7	Ted Calouri	Republican
8	Mary Alice Ford	Republican
9	Tom Brian	Republican
10	Ken Baker	Republican
11	Thomas L. Mason	Democratic
12	Gail Shibley	Democratic
13	Kate Brown	Democratic
14	Beverly Stein, George Eighmey	Democratic
15	Lisa Naito	Democratic
16	Frank Shields	Democratic
17	Mike Burton	Democratic
18	Margaret L. Carter	Democratic
19	Avel Gordly	Democratic
20	John Minnis	Republican
21	Lonnie J. Roberts	Democratic
22	Sharon Wylie	Democratic
23	Bob Shiprack	Democratic
24	Bob Tiernan	Republican
25	Dave McTeague	Democratic
26	Larry Sowa	Democratic
27	Ron Adams	Republican
28	Cedric Hayden	Republican
29	Marilyn Dell	Democratic
30	Fred Girod	Republican
31	Gene Derfler	Republican
32	Kevin Leese Mannix	Democratic
33	Peter Courtney (Minority Leader)	Democratic
34	John Schoon	Republican
35	Tony Van Vliet	Republican
36	Carolyn Oakley	Republican
37	Liz VanLeeuwen	Republican
38	Patti Milne	Republican
39	Jim Edmunson	Democratic
40	Carl Hosticka	Democratic
41	Cynthia Wooten	Democratic
42	Lee Beyer	Democratic
43	Larry Campbell (Speaker)	Republican
44	Sam Dominy	Democratic
45	Bill Fisher	Republican
46	Bill Markham	Republican
47	Jim Whitty	Democratic
48	Veral Tarno	Republican
49	Bob Repine	Republican
50	John Watt	Republican
51	Eldon Johnson	Republican
52	Nancy Peterson	Democratic
53	Del Parks	Republican
54	Dennis Luke	Republican
55	Bev Clarno	Republican
56	Greg Walden (Majority Leader)	Republican
57	Charles R. Norris	Republican
58	Ray Baum	Republican
59	Michael Payne	Democratic
60	Denny Jones	Republican
