= 71st Oregon Legislative Assembly =

←	70th Legislative Assembly	72nd Legislative Assembly	→
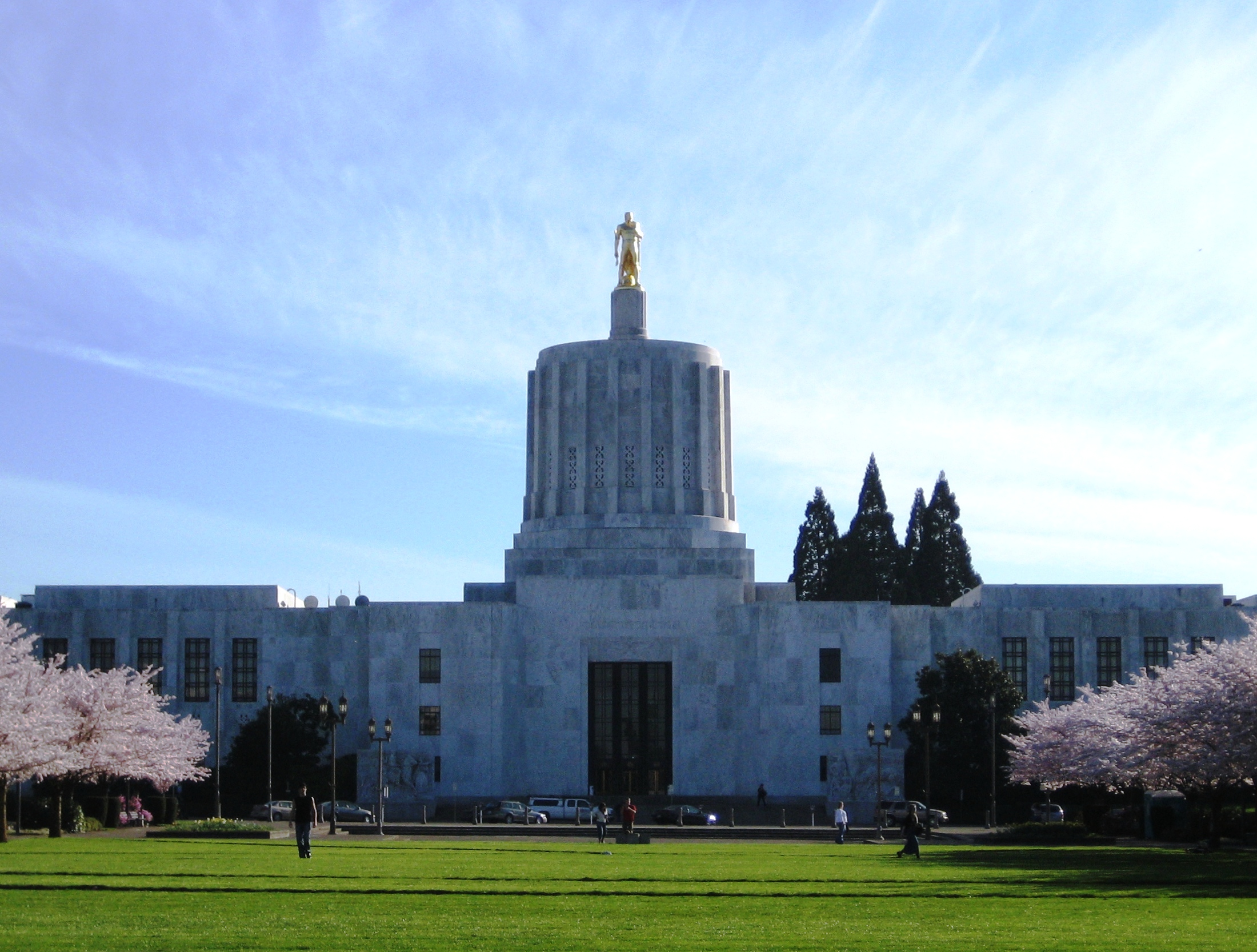
- The legislature took place in the Oregon State Capitol, seen here in 2007

Overview
- Legislative body: Oregon Legislative Assembly
- Jurisdiction: Oregon, United States
- Meeting place: Oregon State Capitol
- Term: 2001–2001
- Website: www.oregonlegislature.gov

Oregon State Senate
- Members: 30 Senators
- Senate President: Gene Derfler (R)
- Majority Leader: David Nelson (R)
- Minority Leader: Kate Brown (D)
- Party control: Republican Party of Oregon

Oregon House of Representatives
- Members: 60 Representatives
- Speaker of the House: Mark Simmons (politician) (R)
- Majority Leader: Karen Minnis (R)
- Minority Leader: Dan Gardener (D)
- Party control: Republican party of Oregon

The 71st Oregon Legislative Assembly was the legislative session of the Oregon Legislative Assembly that convened on January 8, 2001, and adjourned July 7 the same year.

== Senate ==
The senate was composed of 16 Republicans and 14 Democrats.

== Senate Members ==
Composition of the Senate
District	Senator	Party
1	Joan Dukes	Democratic
2	Gary George	Republican
3	Tom Hartung	Republican
4	Ryan Deckert	Democratic
5	Charles Starr	Republican
6	Ginny Burdick	Democratic
7	Kate Brown (Minority Leader)	Democratic
8	Margaret L. Carter	Democratic
9	Frank Shields	Democratic
10	Avel Gordly	Democratic
11	John Minnis	Republican
12	Verne Duncan	Republican
13	Randy Miller	Republican
14	Rick Metsger	Democratic
15	Roger Beyer	Republican
16	Gene Derfler (President)	Republican
17	Peter Courtney	Democratic
18	Cliff Trow	Democratic
19	Mae Yih	Democratic
20	Susan Castillo	Democratic
21	Lee Beyer	Democratic
22	Tony Corcoran	Democratic
23	Bill Fisher	Republican
24	Ken Messerle	Republican
25	Jason Atkinson	Republican
26	Lenn Hannon	Republican
27	Beverly Clarno	Republican
28	Ted Ferrioli	Republican
29	David Nelson (Majority Leader)	Republican
30	Steve Harper	Republican

== House ==
The House opened the session with 33 Republicans and 27 Democrats. Jo Ann Hardesty, a Democrat, resigned on March 15 and was replaced by Jackie Dingfelder, another Democrat. On June 5, Jane Lee switched from Republican to independent.

== House Members ==
Composition of the House
District	House Member	Party
1	Betsy Johnson	Democratic
2	Elaine Hopson	Democratic
3	Bruce Starr	Republican
4	Alan Brown	Republican
5	Jim Hill	Republican
6	Charlie Ringo	Democratic
7	Bill Witt	Republican
8	Mark Hass	Democratic
9	Max Williams	Republican
10	Jan Lee	Republican
11	Mary Nolan	Democratic
12	Chris Beck	Democratic
13	Dan Gardner (Minority Leader)	Democratic
14	Diane Rosenbaum	Democratic
15	Steve March	Democratic
16	Jeff Merkley	Democratic
17	Gary Hansen	Democratic
18	Deborah Kafoury	Democratic
19	Jo Ann Hardesty (resigned 3/15/2001) replaced by Jackie Dingfelder	Democratic
20	Karen Minnis (Majority Leader)	Republican
21	Randy Leonard	Democratic
22	Laurie Monnes Anderson	Democratic
23	Kurt Schrader	Democratic
24	Richard Devlin	Democratic
25	Carolyn Tomei	Democratic
26	Kathy Lowe	Democratic
27	Jerry Krummel	Republican
28	Tootie Smith	Republican
29	Donna G. Nelson	Republican
30	Dan Doyle	Republican
31	Jackie Winters	Republican
32	Janet Carlson	Republican
33	Vic Backlund	Republican
34	Lane Shetterly	Republican
35	Kelley Wirth	Democratic
36	Betsy Close	Republican
37	Jeff Kropf	Republican
38	Cliff Zauner	Republican
39	Robert Ackerman	Democratic
40	Phil Barnhart	Democratic
41	Vicki Walker	Democratic
42	Bill Morrisette	Democratic
43	Cedric Hayden	Republican
44	Al King	Democratic
45	Jeff Kruse	Republican
46	Susan Morgan	Republican
47	Joanne Verger	Democratic
48	Wayne Krieger	Republican
49	Carl Wilson	Republican
50	Rob Patridge	Republican
51	Cherryl Walker	Republican
52	Alan Bates	Democratic
53	Bill Garrard	Republican
54	Tim Knopp	Republican
55	Ben Westlund	Republican
56	Patti Smith	Republican
57	Bob Jenson	Republican
58	Mark Simmons	Republican
59	Greg Smith	Republican
60	Tom Butler	Republican
