= 72nd Oregon Legislative Assembly =

←	71st Legislative Assembly	73rd Legislative Assembly	→
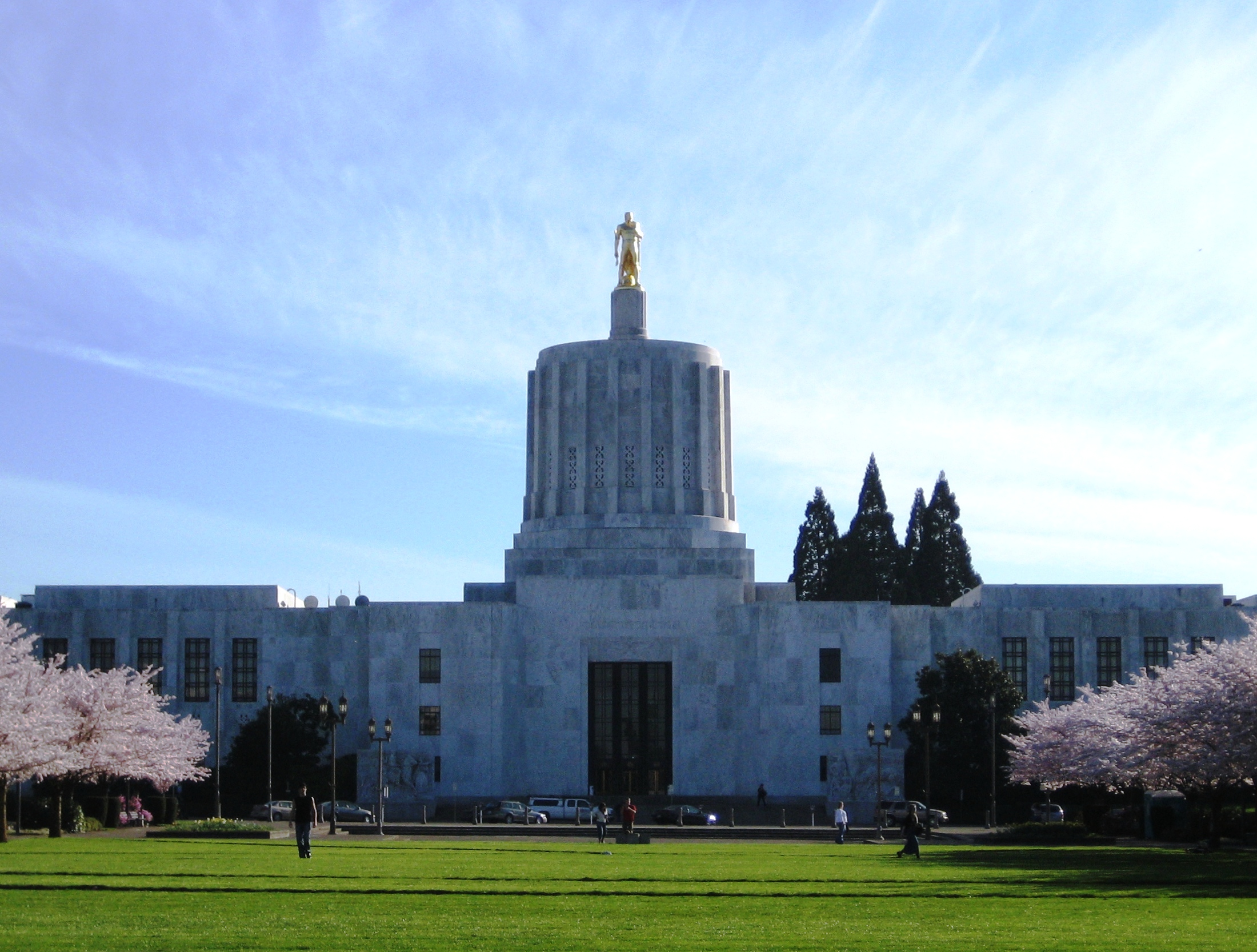
- The legislature took place in the Oregon State Capitol, seen here in 2007

Overview
- Legislative body: Oregon Legislative Assembly
- Jurisdiction: Oregon, United States
- Meeting place: Oregon State Capitol
- Term: 2003–2005
- Website: www.oregonlegislature.gov

Oregon State Senate
- Members: 30 Senators
- Senate President: Peter Courtney (D)
- Majority Leader: Kate Brown (D)
- Minority Leader: Roger Beyer (R)
- Party control: Democratic

Oregon House of Representatives
- Members: 60 Representatives
- Speaker of the House: Karen Minnis (R)
- Majority Leader: Tim Knopp (R)
- Minority Leader: Deborah Kafoury (D)
- Party control: 35-R, 25-D

The 72nd Oregon Legislative Assembly convened in January 2003 for its regular session, which on August 8 of that year surpassed the 1993 session as the longest in the U.S. state of Oregon's history. In the senate, which was evenly divided between 15 Democrats and 15 Republicans, Democratic President Peter Courtney and Republican President Pro Tempore Lenn Hannon were praised by The Oregonian for managing to avoid partisan gridlock. The House was composed of 35 Republicans and 25 Democrats.

Then-state senator Betsy Johnson cited reasons for the extended session in a legislative update: a need to revamp the state budget in the face of declining revenues, and the political dynamics of a new Democratic governor (Ted Kulongoski), a Republican-controlled House of Representatives, and the evenly divided Senate.

The legislature passed a major reform of the state public pension program, PERS, and approved the biggest state transportation investment plan in Oregon history.

In contrast with the 71st Oregon Legislative Assembly, which held five special sessions in 2002, the 72nd convened only for its regular 2003 session, and did not convene in 2004.

== Senate ==
The Senate was composed of 15 Democrats and 15 Republicans.

== Senate members ==
District	Home	Senator	Party
1	Roseburg	Bill Fisher	Republican
2	Jacksonville	Jason Atkinson	Republican
3	Ashland	Lenn Hannon	Republican
4	Cottage Grove	Tony Corcoran	Democratic
4	Eugene	Floyd Prozanski	Democratic
5	Coos Bay	Ken Messerle	Republican
6	Springfield	Bill Morrisette	Democratic
7	Eugene	Vicki Walker	Democratic
8	Corvallis	Frank Morse	Republican
9	Molalla	Roger Beyer	Republican
10	Salem	Jackie Winters	Republican
11	Salem	Peter Courtney	Democratic
12	Newberg	Gary George	Republican
13	Hillsboro	Charles Starr	Republican
14	Beaverton	Ryan Deckert	Democratic
15	Aloha	Bruce Starr	Republican
16	Salem	Joan Dukes	Democratic
17	Beaverton	Charlie Ringo	Democratic
18	Portland	Ginny Burdick	Democratic
19	Tualatin	Richard Devlin	Democratic
20	Canby	Kurt Schrader	Democratic
21	Portland	Kate Brown	Democratic
22	Portland	Margaret Carter	Democratic
23	Portland	Avel Gordly	Democratic
24	Portland	Frank Shields	Democratic
25	Fairview	John Minnis	Republican
26	Hood River	Rick Metsger	Democratic
27	Bend	Bev Clarno	Republican
28	Klamath Falls	Steve Harper	Republican
29	Pendleton	David Nelson	Republican
30	John Day	Ted Ferrioli	Republican

== House members ==
The House was composed of 25 Democrats and 35 Republicans.

District	Home	Representative	Party
1	Gold Beach	Wayne Krieger	Republican
2	Myrtle Creek	Susan Morgan	Republican
3	Grants Pass	Gordon Anderson	Republican
4	Central Point	Dennis Richardson	Republican
5	Ashland	Alan Bates	Democratic
6	Medford	Rob Patridge	Republican
7	Roseburg	Jeff Kruse	Republican
8	Eugene	Floyd Prozanski	Democratic
8	Eugene	Paul Holvey	Democratic
9	Coos Bay	Joanne Verger	Democratic
10	Newport	Alan Brown	Republican
11	Eugene	Phil Barnhart	Democratic
12	Springfield	Terry Beyer	Democratic
13	Eugene	Robert Ackerman	Democratic
14	Eugene	Pat Farr	Republican
15	Albany	Betsy Close	Republican
16	Corvallis	Kelley Wirth	Democratic
17	Sublimity	Jeff Kropf	Republican
18	Mulino	Tootie Smith	Republican
19	Salem	Dan Doyle	Republican
20	Salem	Vicki Berger	Republican
21	Salem	Billy Dalto	Republican
22	Woodburn	Cliff Zauner	Republican
23	Dallas	Lane Shetterly	Republican
23	Dallas	Jim Thompson	Republican
24	McMinnville	Donna G. Nelson	Republican
25	Keizer	Vic Backlund	Republican
26	Wilsonville	Jerry Krummel	Republican
27	Beaverton	Mark Hass	Democratic
28	Aloha	Jeff Barker	Democratic
29	Cornelius	Mary Gallegos	Republican
30	Cornelius	Derrick Kitts	Republican
31	Scappoose	Betsy Johnson	Democratic
32	Tillamook	Elaine Hopson	Democratic
32	Cannon Beach	Deborah Boone	Democratic
33	Portland	Mitch Greenlick	Democratic
34	Beaverton	Brad Avakian	Democratic
35	Tigard	Max Williams	Republican
36	Portland	Mary Nolan	Democratic
37	Lake Oswego	Randy Miller	Republican
38	Lake Oswego	Greg Macpherson	Democratic
39	Canby	Wayne Scott	Republican
40	Milwaukie	Dave Hunt	Democratic
41	Milwaukie	Carolyn Tomei	Democratic
42	Portland	Diane Rosenbaum	Democratic
43	Portland	Deborah Kafoury	Democratic
44	Portland	Gary Hansen	Democratic
45	Portland	Jackie Dingfelder	Democratic
46	Portland	Steve March	Democratic
47	Portland	Jeff Merkley	Democratic
48	Happy Valley	Mike Schaufler	Democratic
49	Fairview	Karen Minnis	Republican
50	Gresham	Laurie Monnes Anderson	Democratic
51	Clackamas	Linda Flores	Republican
52	Corbett	Patti Smith	Republican
53	Bend	Ben Westlund	Republican
54	Bend	Tim Knopp	Republican
55	Medford	George Gilman	Republican
56	Klamath Falls	Bill Garrard	Republican
57	Heppner	Greg Smith	Republican
58	Pendleton	Bob Jenson	Republican
59	The Dalles	John Mabrey	Republican
59	The Dalles	John Dallum	Republican
60	Ontario	R. Tom Butler	Republican
