= Pat Gillis =

American politician

Member of the Oregon House of Representatives from the 20th district
- In office January 12, 1985 – March 26, 1985
- Preceded by: Annette Farmer
- Succeeded by: John Minnis

Personal details
- Party: Republican

Patrick J. Gillis is a Republican politician in the U.S. state of Oregon. He was a member of the Oregon House of Representatives until he was recalled by voters on March 26, 1985.

He was accused of providing inaccurate information about his educational background in the state voter’s pamphlet, an accusation that a Marion County, Oregon, jury acquitted him of in May 1985. Gillis later worked as the president of the international division of the New York-based LEADERS Magazine.
