= Clark County Council =

Legislative body of Clark County, Washington, US

- Clark County, Washington

Type
- Type: County council

Leadership
- Chairperson: Sue Marshall (Nonpartisan)

Structure
- Seats: 5
- Political groups: Democratic Party (3); Republican Party (2)
- Length of term: 4 years

Elections
- Last election: November 5, 2024

Meeting place
- Public Service Center; 1300 Franklin Street; Vancouver, Washington

Website
- Clark County Council

The Clark County Council is the legislative body of Clark County, Washington, United States. The county council consists of five members, four elected by district, and one elected at-large. The Council adopts laws, sets policy, and holds final approval over the budget.

== Members ==
District	Councilmember	Party	Took office
1	Glen Yung	Democratic	January 2, 2019
2	Michelle Belkot	Republican	January 1, 2023
3	Wil Fuentes	Democratic	January 1, 2025
4	Matt Little	Democratic	January 1, 2025
5	Sue Marshall (Chair)	Republican	January 1, 2023

== History ==
The county council was created on November 4, 2014, by Clark County voters as part of a home rule charter, which replaced the traditional three-member county commission with a three-member Board of County Councilors. The council was expanded to five members on January 1, 2016. The county council adopted its current name in January 2018. Clark County was the seventh county in Washington to adopt a home rule charter.
