= Hedy Rijken =

American politician

Member of the Oregon House of Representatives from the 4th district
- In office January 9, 1989 – January 9, 1995
- Preceded by: Don Butsch
- Succeeded by: Terry Thompson

Personal details
- Born: 1957 or 1958 (age 68–69) Netherlands
- Party: Democratic
- Parent: Max Rijken

Hedy Rijken is an American politician who was a member of the Oregon House of Representatives from 1989 to 1995.

== Biography ==
Her father, Max Rijken, was a legislator as well, representing Lincoln County in the legislature for 12 years. He was a Dutch Indonesian immigrant. She was born in Holland in 1957 or 1958 and moved to the United States at the age of 4. Outside of politics, she worked as a retail clerk. She lives in Newport, Oregon. She identifies as a lesbian. She attented Oregon State University. She was fined $12000 in 1988 for improperly reporting her campaign finances, though she admitted fault and sought to move beyond the incident.
