= Marilyn Kittelman =

American politician and newspaper publisher

Personal details
- Party: Republican
- Spouse: John Kittelman
- Children: 3
- Occupation: Realtor

Marilyn Kittelman is an American politician, newspaper publisher and businesswoman from Douglas County, Oregon.

== Political career ==
Marilyn Kittelman was elected as a Douglas County Commissioner in 2004 and served one four-year term in that position. After surviving a recall vote in which 49.8% of the voters voted against her and then losing her 2008 re-election bid to Susan Morgan, Kittelman became co-owner of The Roseburg Beacon. She was the Republican nominee for State Senate in Oregon's 4th District running against incumbent Floyd Prozanski. On November 2, 2010, Kittelman was defeated by Prozanski, with Prozanski receiving more than 58 percent of the vote, and Kittelman receiving less than 42 percent.

== Electoral history ==
Douglas County Commissioner Position 1 election, 2004:

- Marilyn Kittelman (R) – 29,988 (53.96%)
- Joyce Akse (D) – 22,780 (40.99%)

Douglas County Commissioner Position 1 recall election, 2006:

- Yes – 16,049 (49.81%)
- No – 16,174 (50.19%)

Douglas County Commissioner Position 1 election, 2008:

- Susan Morgan – 20,576 (55.29%)
- Marilyn Kittelman – 11,108 (29.85%)
- Patrick Starnes – 5,492 (14.76%)

Oregon State Senate District 4 election, 2010:

- Floyd Prozanski (D) – 29,077 (58.11%)
- Marilyn Kittelman (R) – 20,961 (41.89%)

== Personal life ==
Kittelman is married and has three children. She resides in Yoncalla, Oregon.
