= Mary Alice Ford =

American politician

Member of the Oregon House of Representatives
- In office 1979–1995
- Preceded by: Mike Ragsdale
- Succeeded by: Eileen Qutub
- Constituency: Washington County

Personal details
- Born: April 23, 1935 Los Angeles, California
- Died: November 27, 2008 (aged 73)
- Party: Republican
- Spouse: William Ford (1957 – c. 1970s)
- Children: Sherilyn Lawson; Thomas Ford; John Ford
- Occupation: Teacher, consultant

Mary Alice Ford (April 23, 1935 – November 27, 2008) was a Republican politician from the U.S. state of Oregon. A native of California, the moderate and pro-choice Republican served in the Oregon House of Representatives for 15 consecutive years representing Washington County.

== Early life ==
Ford was born Mary Alice Hood in Los Angeles, California, on April 23, 1935. Graduating from high school at South Pasadena High School in 1952, she enrolled at Stanford University in Palo Alto, California, where she earned her Bachelor of Arts degree in education in 1956 from the Stanford Graduate School of Education. She married William Ford in 1957 and they had three children; Thomas, John, and Sherilyn. She later divorced William Ford, but retained the last name. Ford was a stay at home mother.

== Political career ==
A pro-choice Republican, Ford was a member of the party's central committee for Washington County from 1973 until 1979. In 1979, she was appointed to the Oregon House of Representatives representing Garden Home in the eastern part of Washington County. Ford was appointed to the office after House member Mike Ragsdale resigned in order to be appointed to the Oregon State Senate. Ford won the seat in the next election and was re-elected six times, serving a total of eight terms, through the 1993 legislative session. As a legislator, she worked to promote social services and health care and was appointed to the Architectural and Transportation Barrier Compliance Board in 1981 by President Ronald Reagan. She served as chair of that board.

The 1992 Republican primary was a close election for Ford. The strength of her opponent, Sandra Nelson, reflected a changing Washington County Republican electorate that would sweep Ford out of office in the 1994 primary. At a debate at the Washington County Public Affairs Forum on Monday May 4, 1992, Ford and Nelson explained their differing views on various issues involving government interference in individual lives, and on the controversial Oregon Citizens Alliance. Nelson stated that if elected, she would roll back laws requiring helmets for motorcycle riders and also author legislation to allow parents the right to determine if their children need to wear seat belts in cars, stating "government decisions can cause children to suffer". Ford disagreed with Nelson, stating: "A lot of people choose not to be responsible, society pays for their indifference through indigent care and higher insurance premiums". On the Oregon Citizens Alliance, the candidates also differed in their approaches to the group. Nelson supported the group, even though she questioned some of its specific policies. Ford again found herself opposite of Nelson, believing that such groups with narrow goals are not good for the state. In the general election she defeated Dennis Doyle, a computer consultant, to win what would be her final term in the legislature.

Ford lost her seat in the 1994 primary to Eileen Qutub, who went on to win the seat in the November election. She said of her opponents on the religious right after her defeat: "Quite frankly, I don't consider them Republicans, I consider them religious opportunists." In 1996, she ran to reclaim her House District 8 seat. The Oregonian endorsed her in the Republican primary saying, "she was respected by lawmakers from both parties and thus was able to deliver quality service to her constituents even when a member of the minority party. That, in essence, defines the role of a good legislator." She would go on to lose to conservative Bill Moshofsky.

== Later years ==
After leaving the legislature she was named one of four 1994 Women of Achievement by the Oregon Commission for Women.

In 1998 Ford led a group of other moderate Republicans including Audrey McCall (wife of former Governor Tom McCall), Washington County Commission Chairman Tom Brian, Sen. Jeannette Hamby, former Secretary of State Clay Myers and Rep. Chuck Carpenter, and endorsed Democrat Ryan Deckert in his race against Republican Henri Schauffler. The support from Mary Alice Ford and other republicans was highly valuable as the GOP held a slim voter registration edge in house district 8 at the time. During the 2006 election she was critical of the same negative campaign tactics by "right-wing Republicans" that had defeated her in 1994. She believed that Republican congressional candidate Mike Erickson's attacks against Congresswomen Darlene Hooley were "vicious and too egregious to let pass".

Ford died on November 27, 2008, after suffering from a major stroke earlier in the week. Ford was interred at Sunset Hills Memorial Park in Portland, Oregon, on December 5, 2008.

== Electoral history ==
1996 Republican Primary
Candidate name	Votes
Bill Moshofsky	3,314
Mary Alice Ford	1,911

1994 Republican Primary
Candidate name	Votes
Eileen Qutub	2,915
Mary Alice Ford	1,609
Robert T. Nash	238

1992 General Election
Candidate name	Votes
Mary Alice Ford (R)	10,407
Dennis Doyle (D)	8,553

1992 Republican Primary
Candidate name	Votes
Mary Alice Ford	2,718
Sandra Nelson	2,310

1990 General Election
Candidate name	Votes
Mary Alice Ford (R)	11,451
Jim Gennette (D)	5,127
