= Dave McTeague =

American politician

Member of the Oregon House of Representatives from the 25th district
- In office January 1985 – January 1995
- Preceded by: Glen Whallon
- Succeeded by: Jane Lokan

Personal details
- Born: November 19, 1952 (age 73) Minneapolis, Minnesota, United States
- Party: Democratic
- Spouse: Naomi
- Children: 2
- Education: University of Oregon

Dave McTeague (born November 19, 1952) is an American Democratic politician who served in the Oregon House of Representatives from 1985 until 1995.

== Early life ==
McTeague was born in Minneapolis, Minnesota in 1952 to Ken, a school music teacher, and Dorine McTeague. He graduated from the University of Oregon in 1978 with a bachelor's degree in political science.

== Political career ==
McTeague served as a delegate to the 1972 and 1980 Democratic National Conventions, and was State President of the Oregon Young Democrats in 1977. He was elected to the Oregon House of Representatives in 1984, unseating the incumbent Democrat. McTeague represented Milwaukie and Oak Grove in the House. Between 1996 and 2014, McTeague was director of the Oregon Board of Chiropractic Examiners, and from 2003 until 2015, he was a board member of the Clackamas Fire District.

=== 2016 congressional campaign ===
McTeague ran against incumbent representative Kurt Schrader in the 2016 Democratic primary for Oregon's 5th congressional district. He was defeated, and received approximately 28% of the vote to Schrader's 72%. He endorsed the 2016 presidential campaign of Senator Bernie Sanders.

Oregon's 5th congressional district Democratic primary, 2016
Party	Candidate	Votes	%
Democratic	Kurt Schrader	72,634	71.65
Democratic	Dave McTeague	28,184	27.80
Democratic	Write-ins	549	0.54
Total votes		101,367	100

=== Political positions ===
McTeague supports overturning Citizens United and opposes the Trans-Pacific Partnership. He also supports legalization of marijuana.

== Personal life ==
McTeague and his wife, Naomi, have two children: Brianna and Ian.
