= Mary Nolan (politician) =

American politician in Oregon (born 1954)

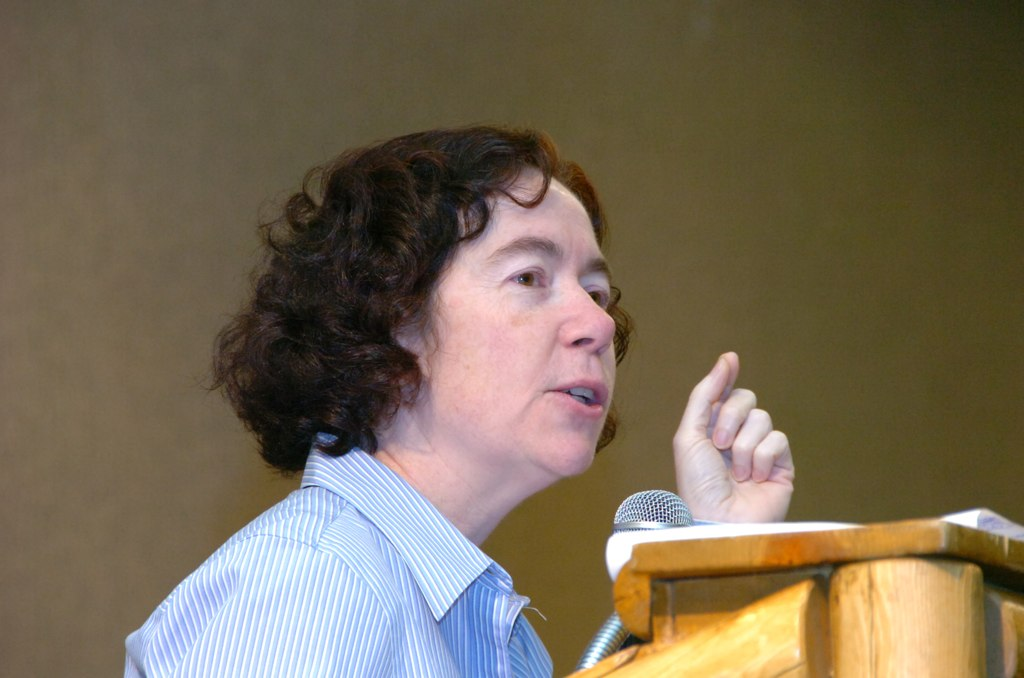

Metro Councilor from the 5th district
- Incumbent
- Assumed office January 4, 2021
- Preceded by: Sam Chase

Majority Leader of the Oregon House of Representatives
- In office January 2009 – January 2011
- Preceded by: Dave Hunt
- Succeeded by: Kevin Cameron; Dave Hunt

Member of the Oregon House of Representatives from the 36th district
- In office January 2001 – January 2013
- Preceded by: Anitra Rasmussen
- Succeeded by: Jennifer Williamson

Personal details
- Born: November 28, 1954 (age 71) Chicago, Illinois, U.S.
- Party: Democratic
- Spouse: Mark Gardiner
- Education: Dartmouth College (BA)

Mary Therese Nolan (born November 28, 1954) is a Democratic politician from the U.S. state of Oregon. They (Note: Nolan uses they/them/theirs pronouns.) represented District 36 (formerly District 11) in the Oregon House of Representatives from 2001 to 2013 and served as the majority leader from 2008 to 2010. They ran unsuccessfully for the Portland City Council in 2012. They came back into office in 2020, when they were elected as one of the councilors for the Portland-area regional government, Metro.

== Personal life and education ==
Nolan was born in Chicago, Illinois. They are married to Mark Gardiner with one child.

Nolan was a member of the first class of women admitted into Dartmouth College, from which they graduated magna cum laude in mathematics.

Following their defeat in the 2012 Portland City Council election, Nolan was a finalist for a position with Planned Parenthood and was then hired in 2013 as a vice president at FamilyCare, a Medicare and Medicaid-managed-care provider in Portland.

== Political career ==
Nolan was first elected to the Oregon House of Representatives in 2000. Upon winning their second term in 2002, they were named as assistant Democratic leadership. Before the 2009 legislative session, Dave Hunt, the then-majority leader, was elected speaker of the Oregon House of Representatives. The Democratic Caucus then elected Nolan as the new majority leader. They were the House Majority Leader in the Oregon House of Representatives from November 2008 until November 2010. In November 2010, the House Democratic Caucus did not re-elect Nolan to any leadership position.

According to The Oregonian, as of 2010 Nolan voted with Democrats 96.77% of the time, and had a 1.08% absence record. After Nolan voted "no" on House Bill 2001, which would have increased transportation taxes by $300 million a year in 2009, The Oregonian reported that the move could mean that Nolan may have been planning to run for another public office like Mayor of Portland or City Council because of what it meant for environmentalists who had opposed the transportation bill.

Nolan ran for a seat on the Portland City Council in May 2012, challenging incumbent commissioner Amanda Fritz. Fritz won the runoff election in November 2012.

In 2020, Nolan ran in and won the election to serve a four-year term as the 5th district councilor for Metro, the multi-faceted regional government for the Portland metropolitan area. They advanced from the primary on May 19, 2020 and faced Chris Smith in a runoff in the general election. Nolan won with 61% of the vote to Smith's 37%. District 5 covers much of north, northeast, and northwest Portland.

In 2026, Nolan faced criticism for asking Latino fellow Metro councilor Juan Carlos González to repeat a comment "in English" despite González already using the language, and then giving a "false apology". It was revealed that Nolan had been working remotely from Spain for many months at a time.

=== Committee assignments ===
2009 Regular Session

- Conference Committee On HB 2227, Chair
- Land Use Committee, Chair
- Legislative Administration Committee
- Rules Committee
- Session Schedule Committee

=== Issues ===
==== Firearms ====
On March 14, 2003, Nolan introduced a bill that would make it a crime to possess a gun while on a public bus.

== Electoral history ==
Oregon House of Representatives, 11th district, 2000

- Mary Nolan (D) – 18,008
- Joan Gardner (R) – 7,752

Oregon House of Representatives, 36th district, 2002

- Mary Nolan (D) – 16,092

2004 Oregon State Representative, 36th district
Party	Candidate	Votes	%
Democratic	Mary Nolan	25,876	86.6
Libertarian	H. Joe Tabor	3,684	12.3
Write-in		308	1.0
Total votes		29,868	100%

2006 Oregon State Representative, 36th district
Party	Candidate	Votes	%
Democratic	Mary Nolan	20,344	84.8
Libertarian	Frank Dane	3,520	14.7
Write-in		137	0.6
Total votes		24,001	100%

2008 Oregon State Representative, 36th district
Party	Candidate	Votes	%
Democratic	Mary Nolan	25,939	81.2
Republican	Steve Oppenheim	4,738	14.8
Libertarian	Jay A Ellefson	1,162	3.6
Write-in		100	0.3
Total votes		31,939	100%

2010 Oregon State Representative, 36th district
Party	Candidate	Votes	%
Democratic	Mary Nolan	21,407	78.5
Republican	Diane Schendel	5,776	21.2
Write-in		78	0.3
Total votes		27,261	100%

=== Endorsements ===
- 2008: Willamette Week

== Notes ==
Political offices
Preceded by Anitra Rasmussen	Member of the Oregon House of Representatives from the 11th district 2001–2003	Succeeded by Redistricted
Preceded by Redistricted	Member of the Oregon House of Representatives from the 36th district 2003–2013	Succeeded by Jennifer Williamson
Party political offices
Preceded by Dave Hunt	Oregon House Majority Leader; 2009–2011	Succeeded by Dave Hunt
