= Betsy Johnson =

American politician (born 1951)

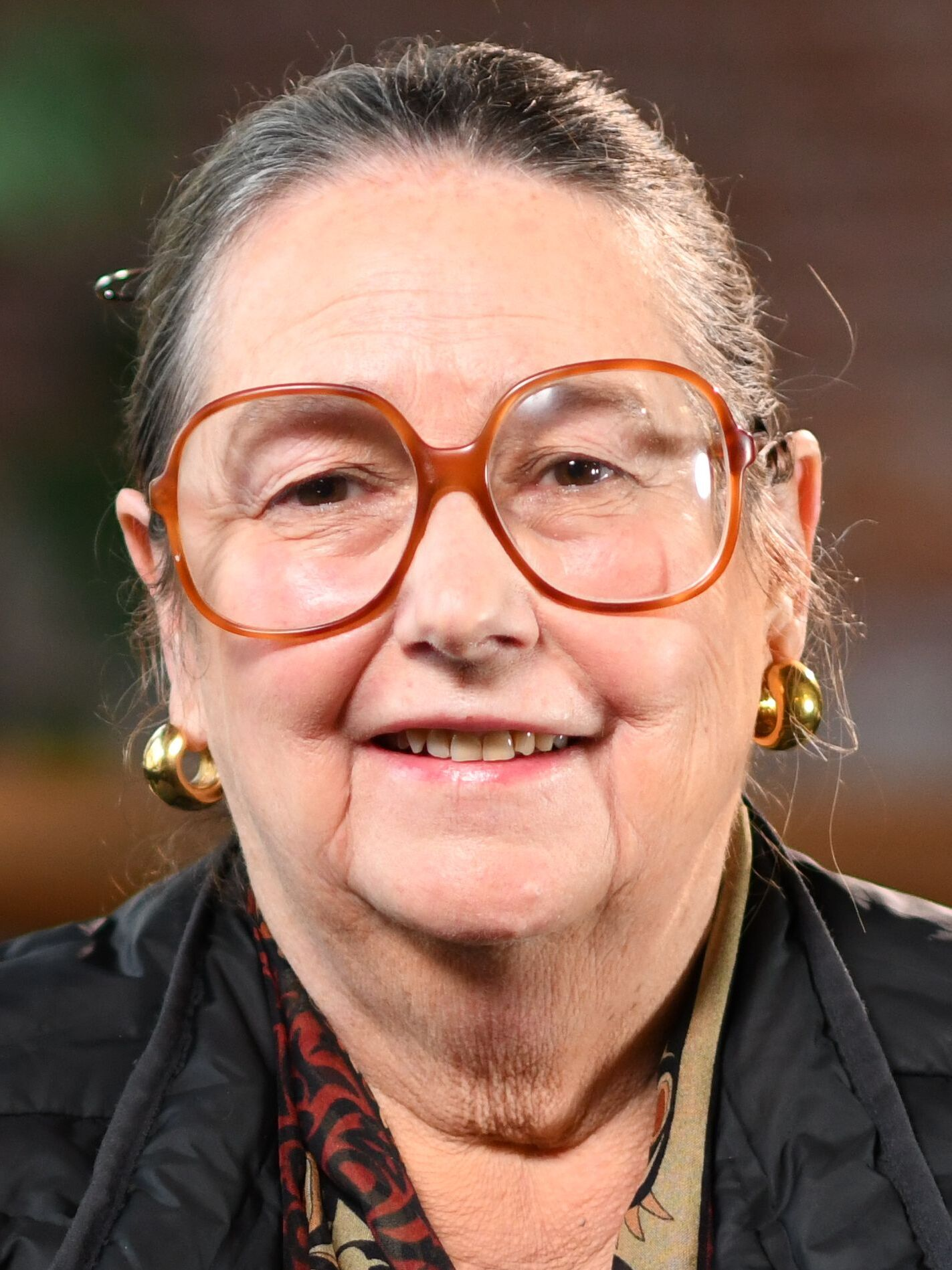
- Johnson in 2022

Member of the Oregon Senate from the 16th district
- In office January 20, 2005 – December 16, 2021
- Preceded by: Joan Dukes
- Succeeded by: Rachel Armitage

Member of the Oregon House of Representatives
- In office January 13, 2003 – January 20, 2005
- Preceded by: Jackie Winters
- Succeeded by: Brad Witt
- Constituency: 31st district
- In office January 8, 2001 – January 13, 2003
- Preceded by: Jackie Taylor
- Succeeded by: Wayne Krieger
- Constituency: 1st district

Personal details
- Born: Elizabeth Katharine Johnson; January 12, 1951 (age 75) Bend, Oregon, U.S.
- Party: Independent (since 2021)
- Other political affiliations: Democratic (before 2021)
- Spouse: John Helm
- Relatives: Sam Johnson (father)
- Education: Carleton College (BA); Lewis and Clark College (JD)
- Website: betsyjohnsonfororegon.com

Elizabeth Katharine "Betsy" Johnson (born January 12, 1951) is an American aviator, entrepreneur, and politician who served in the Oregon House of Representatives from the 1st and 31st House districts from 2001 to 2005, and in the Oregon Senate from the 16th district from 2005 to 2021, as a member of the Democratic Party. Prior to her tenure in the state legislature she served on the Port of St. Helens board and worked in the Oregon Department of Transportation.

Johnson was born in Bend, Oregon, as the daughter of Sam Johnson, who served in the state house. She was raised in Redmond, Oregon, and educated at Oregon Episcopal School, Carleton College, and Lewis and Clark College. She operated a helicopter business and participated in international helicopter competitions. She was active in local politics in Columbia County, Oregon, where she served on the boards of multiple groups and she was elected to the Port of St. Helens board in a 1993 special election. She was the manager of aeronautics in the Oregon Department of Transportation from 1993 to 1998.

She was elected to the state house in the 2000 election and reelected in the 2002 and 2004 elections. Johnson was appointed to replace Joan Dukes in the state senate in 2005, and was reelected in the 2006, 2010, 2014, and 2018 elections. She was a moderate and conservative member of the Democratic caucus and held a controlling swing vote. She resigned from the state senate in 2021, to run in the 2022 gubernatorial election as an independent candidate, losing to Tina Kotek.

== Early life and education ==
Elizabeth Katharine Johnson was born on January 12, 1951, in Bend, Oregon, to Elizabeth Hill Johnson and Sam Johnson, who served in the Oregon House of Representatives for fourteen years. She was raised in Redmond, Oregon, and graduated from Oregon Episcopal School in 1969. She campaigned for her father during her youth. She graduated from Carleton College with a bachelor's degree in history in 1974, and from Lewis and Clark College with a Juris Doctor in 1977.

Johnson married John Helm. She represented the United States at a helicopter competition in Vitebsk, Soviet Union, in 1978. Johnson created Trans-Western Helicopters in 1978, and it merged into Hillsboro Helicopters in 1993. She served as president of the Columbia County Economic Development Council, and was on the boards of the Columbia County Health District, St. Helens Chamber of Commerce, and United Way of Columbia County. She was appointed to the board of the Oregon Tourism Alliance in 1989. She replaced Betty Roberts as the chair of the Tom McCall lectureship committee at Oregon State University in 1992. She was the director of the Federal Reserve Bank of San Francisco Portland Branch for six years.

== Career ==
=== Local politics ===
Tony Federici, a member of the Port of St. Helens board from the fourth position resigned in January 1993, in order to take office in the state house from the 1st district. Johnson defeated four other candidates in the 1993 special election and won without opposition in the 1997 election. She replaced Eric Dahlgren as chair of the board in 1999. She was appointed as the Manager of Aeronautics in the Oregon Department of Transportation in 1993, and served until her resignation on September 7, 1998.

=== Oregon House of Representatives ===
Jackie Taylor, a member of the state house from the 1st district, was term-limited during the 2000 election. Johnson faced no opposition in the Democratic primary and won the Republican primary as a write-in candidate and defeated Constitution nominee Bob Ekstrom, the chair of the party, and Libertarian nominee Don McDaniel. She won the Democratic and Republican nominations and was elected from the 31st district in the 2002 election against Constitution nominee Ekstrom and independent candidate Mervin Arnold. She won the Democratic and Republican nominations and defeated Constitution nominee Ron Ross in the 2004 election.

In the state house Johnson used the same desk that her father had used during his tenure. During her tenure in the state house she served on the Ways and Means committee. Johnson was appointed to a shared seat on the Oregon Emergency Board with Representative Dan Doyle in 2001. Following the September 11 attacks the House Special Task Force on State Emergency Preparedness was formed with Johnson being one of its members. She worked as Ron Wyden's campaign chair during the 2004 United States Senate election.

=== Oregon Senate ===
Joan Dukes, a member of the Oregon Senate, was appointed to the Northwest Power and Conservation Council by Governor Ted Kulongoski in 2004. Johnson announced on November 24, 2004, that she was interested in replacing Dukes in the state senate. Johnson, Bill Blank, and Emil Nyberg were nominated by the Columbia County Democratic Committee as possible options to replace Dukes. County commissioners from Columbia, Clatsop, Multnomah, Tillamook, and Washington counties voted unanimously on January 19, 2005, to appoint Johnson and she was sworn in on January 20. Brad Witt was selected to replace her in the state house.

She defeated Republican nominee Don Fell and Constitution nominee Robert J. Simmering in the 2006 election. She defeated Republican nominee Bob Horning in the 2010 election. Howard Dean, the former chair of the Democratic National Committee, called for Johnson to be replaced after she voted with the Republicans against voter registration legislation in 2013. She defeated Independent Party of Oregon nominee Andrew Kaza, Constitution nominee Ekstrom, and Libertarian nominee Perry Roll in the 2014 election. She won the Democratic, Republican, and Independent nominations, with write-in votes in the Republican and Independent primaries, and defeated Constitution nominee Ray Biggs in the 2018 election.

During her tenure in the state senate she served on the Rules committee and co-chaired the Ways and Means committee. An ethics investigation was launched against her on June 22, 2007, as she did not report profits of $119,000 from selling property connected to legislation she sponsored and she later paid a $600 fine. She was later investigated by the Federal Bureau of Investigation. Due to the Democrats' narrow control of the state senate she had a controlling swing vote and blocked legislation.

She endorsed Dennis Richardson, the Republican nominee for Oregon Secretary of State, in the 2016 election. She and Witt were removed from the executive committee of the Democratic Party of Oregon due to their support of Richardson. Lee Beyer, Johnson, and Arnie Roblan called for United States Senators Wyden and Jeff Merkley to support President Donald Trump's appointment of Ryan Bounds to the United States Court of Appeals for the Ninth Circuit.

Johnson hit a driver with her car in 2013, resulting in Betsy Johnson spending six months in a wheelchair and not fully recovering until 2019. She was sued by the driver in 2015, but Johnson's lawyers argued the lawsuit was frivolous, and a violation of the Oregon Constitution due to her being in transit to her complete her duties as an elected official. The lawsuit was subsequently dismissed.

=== 2022 Oregon gubernatorial campaign ===
Johnson was considered as a possible gubernatorial or secretary of state candidate in the 2000s. She announced on October 14, 2021, in an email that she was going to run as an independent in the 2022 gubernatorial election stating "[H]aving to choose between another left-wing liberal promising more of the same or a right-wing Trump apologist – is no choice at all". The Democratic caucus subsequently removed her from all of her committee assignments. She announced on December 14, that she was going to resign from the state senate to focus on her gubernatorial campaign; this took effect on December 16.

TEDxPortland was criticized for, and subsequently apologized for, inviting Betsy Johnson to a May 2022 conference in violation of the Internal Revenue Service's regulations for 501(c)3 nonprofits, which require that if any political candidates are invited to speak at an event, all other candidates are given an equal opportunity. She received endorsements from former governor Ted Kulongoski and former United States senator Gordon H. Smith. By early June, her campaign had raised $5,611,714.37 and spent $3,292,831.82. In July, OPB reported that "shirts bearing the Confederate flag...dott[ed] the crowd" at a June rally in St. Helens, a flag which Johnson later condemned as "a symbol of treason against the United States". She stated to OPB in September that as governor she would lift the moratorium on capital punishment and enforce the death penalty.

Johnson's campaign spent $897,000 to collect 48,214 signatures, with 23,744 being required to appear on the ballot. 37,679 were validated by the secretary of state.

In the general election, Johnson conceded to Tina Kotek after garnering less than 10% of the total vote.

== Political positions ==
Johnson was considered as a moderate and conservative member of the state legislature. She received a lifetime rating of 34.34% from the American Conservative Union. The American Civil Liberties Union gave her a score of 43% in 2005, 50% in 2007, 0% in 2008, 60% in 2009, 20% in 2013, 83% in 2015, and 50% in 2017.

=== Jobs and economics ===
Johnson supported the construction of a $230 million ethanol plant in Clatskanie, Oregon. She voted in committee in favor of legislation to ban smoking in restaurants, but stated that she did so only to send it to a vote in the state house. In 2002, Johnson voted in favor of the unsuccessful effort to overturn legislation to borrow $50 million for education against revenue made from a cigarette tax.

Johnson voted against parental leave legislation in 2007. In 2009, she voted against legislation supported by the AFL–CIO that prohibited workers from being required to attend company meetings about politics. She voted against increasing the minimum wage gradually from 2016 to 2022, to between $12.50 and $14.75 per hour. Johnson received a D rating from the Service Employees International Union in 2018. She received a score of 50% from the National Federation of Independent Business in 2020.

=== Crime and gun control ===
Johnson opposed four pieces of gun control legislation in 2013, stating "I would do something meaningful rather than symbolic" and wanted more mental health access instead. She voted against background checks for private gun sales and red flag legislation. She is a member of the National Rifle Association and received an "A" rating and endorsement from the NRA Political Victory Fund during the 2014 and 2018 elections.

She voted against legislation in 2019 to redefine aggravated murder and limit its scope, the only crime in Oregon which is eligible for the death penalty. She also is in favor of lifting the state moratorium on the death penalty.

=== Homelessness and housing ===
Johnson opposes a housing first approach to homelessness, and would enforce laws against illegal camping in Oregon. She blames recent drug legalization, such as through 2020 Oregon Ballot Measure 110, for driving the crisis and would attempt to repeal it, while also focusing on deregulating housing development.

=== Healthcare and individual rights ===
Johnson supports abortion rights. She stated that "Planned Parenthood now is a wholly owned subsidiary of the Democrat Party" after failing to gain its endorsement during the 2022 gubernatorial election. She opposes allowing transgender athletes to participate in girls' sporting events.

=== Voter rights and election integrity ===
Johnson has not shown support for adopting political campaign contribution limits in Oregon, and said she would oppose limits she felt "result in an uneven playing field for anyone participating in elections". She voted against legislation to make voter registration automatic for people with driver's licenses.

=== Environment and climate change ===
She received a lifetime score of 64% from the League of Conservation Voters, and has a record of voting against legislation to combat climate change, such as Oregon House Bill 2020.

== Electoral history ==
=== Oregon House of Representatives ===
2000 Oregon House of Representatives 1st district Democratic primary
Party	Candidate	Votes	%
Democratic	Betsy Johnson	6,658	98.01%
Write-in		135	1.99%
Total votes		6,793	100.00%

2000 Oregon House of Representatives 1st district Republican primary
Party	Candidate	Votes	%
Republican	Betsy Johnson (write-in)	379	49.93%
Write-in		380	50.07%
Total votes		759	100.00%

2000 Oregon House of Representatives 1st district election
Party	Candidate	Votes	%
Democratic	Betsy Johnson	14,692	61.95%
Constitution	Bob Ekstrom	7,368	31.07%
Libertarian	Don McDaniel	1,588	6.70%
Write-in		67	0.28%
Total votes		23,715	100.00%

2002 Oregon House of Representatives 31st district Democratic primary
Party	Candidate	Votes	%
Democratic	Betsy Johnson (incumbent)	7,295	98.54%
Write-in		108	1.46%
Total votes		7,403	100.00%

2002 Oregon House of Representatives 31st district Republican primary
Party	Candidate	Votes	%
Republican	Betsy Johnson (incumbent) (write-in)	320	59.04%
Write-in		222	40.96%
Total votes		542	100.00%

2002 Oregon House of Representatives 31st district election
Party	Candidate	Votes	%
Democratic	Betsy Johnson (incumbent)	14,643	66.58%
Constitution	Bob Ekstrom	5,261	23.92%
Independent	Mervin Arnold	1,979	9.00%
Write-in		111	0.50%
Total votes		21,994	100.00%

2004 Oregon House of Representatives 31st district Democratic primary
Party	Candidate	Votes	%
Democratic	Betsy Johnson (incumbent)	6,964	98.54%
Write-in		103	1.46%
Total votes		7,067	100.00%

2004 Oregon House of Representatives 31st district Republican primary
Party	Candidate	Votes	%
Republican	Betsy Johnson (incumbent) (write-in)	400	64.72%
Write-in		218	35.28%
Total votes		618	100.00%

2004 Oregon House of Representatives 31st district election
Party	Candidate	Votes	%
Democratic	Betsy Johnson (incumbent)	21,660	76.17%
Constitution	Ron Ross	6,551	23.04%
Write-in		227	0.80%
Total votes		28,438	100.00%

=== Oregon Senate ===
2006 Oregon Senate 16th district election
Primary election
Party	Candidate	Votes	%
Democratic	Betsy Johnson (incumbent)	11,583	98.86%
Write-in		133	1.14%
Total votes		11,716	100.00%
General election
Democratic	Betsy Johnson (incumbent)	30,645	63.58%
Republican	Ron Fell	16,040	33.28%
Constitution	Robert J. Simmering	1,429	2.96%
Write-in		85	0.18%
Total votes		48,199	100.00%

2010 Oregon Senate 16th district election
Primary election
Party	Candidate	Votes	%
Democratic	Betsy Johnson (incumbent)	12,294	96.96%
Write-in		385	3.04%
Total votes		12,679	100.00%
General election
Democratic	Betsy Johnson (incumbent)	27,182	54.38%
Republican	Bob Horning	22,657	45.32%
Write-in		150	0.30%
Total votes		49,989	100.00%

2014 Oregon Senate 16th district Democratic primary
Party	Candidate	Votes	%
Democratic	Betsy Johnson (incumbent)	9,965	97.53%
Write-in		252	2.47%
Total votes		10,217	100.00%

2014 Oregon Senate 16th district Republican primary
Party	Candidate	Votes	%
Republican	Betsy Johnson (incumbent) (write-in)	449	70.27%
Write-in		190	29.73%
Total votes		639	100.00%

2014 Oregon Senate 16th district election
Party	Candidate	Votes	%
Democratic	Betsy Johnson (incumbent)	34,324	70.04%
Independent Party	Andrew Kaza	6,603	13.47%
Constitution	Bob Ekstrom	5,985	12.21%
Libertarian	Perry Roll	1,901	3.88%
Write-in		193	0.39%
Total votes		49,006	100.00%

2018 Oregon Senate 16th district Democratic primary
Party	Candidate	Votes	%
Democratic	Betsy Johnson (incumbent)	12,337	97.33%
Write-in		339	2.67%
Total votes		12,676	100.00%

2018 Oregon Senate 16th district Republican primary
Party	Candidate	Votes	%
Republican	Betsy Johnson (incumbent) (write-in)	1,549	76.04%
Write-in		488	23.96%
Total votes		2,037	100.00%

2018 Oregon Senate 16th district Independent primary
Party	Candidate	Votes	%
Independent Party	Betsy Johnson (incumbent) (write-in)	256	78.53%
Write-in		70	21.47%
Total votes		326	100.00%

2018 Oregon Senate 16th district election
Party	Candidate	Votes	%
Democratic	Betsy Johnson (incumbent)	50,398	82.03%
Constitution	Ray Biggs	10,637	17.31%
Write-in		400	0.65%
Total votes		61,435	100.00%

=== Oregon Governor ===
2022 Oregon gubernatorial election
Party	Candidate	Votes	%	±%
Democratic	Tina Kotek	916,635	46.96%	−3.09%
Republican	Christine Drazan	849,853	43.54%	−0.11%
Independent	Betsy Johnson	168,363	8.63%	N/A
Constitution	Donice Noelle Smith	8,047	0.41%	−0.72%
Libertarian	R. Leon Noble	6,862	0.35%	−1.20%
Write-in		2,113	0.11%	-0.05
Total votes		1,951,873	100.00%	

Oregon House of Representatives
Preceded by Jackie Taylor	Member of the Oregon House of Representatives from the 1st district 2001–2003	Succeeded by Wayne Krieger
Preceded by Jackie Winters	Member of the Oregon House of Representatives from the 31st district 2003–2005	Succeeded by Brad Witt
Oregon Senate
Preceded by Joan Dukes	Member of the Oregon Senate from the 16th district 2005–2021	Succeeded by Rachel Armitage
