= Jackie Taylor (politician) =

Oregon politician

Member of the Oregon House of Representatives from the 31st District
- In office 1990–2000
- Succeeded by: Betsy Johnson

Personal details
- Born: Jacqueline Self; February 16, 1935 Thomas, Oklahoma
- Died: July 15, 2008 (aged 73) Astoria, Oregon
- Party: Democratic
- Education: Boise State University

Jacqueline S. Taylor (February 16, 1935 – July 15, 2008) was an American politician who served as a member of the Oregon House of Representatives.

== Early life and education ==
Taylor was born in 1935 in Thomas, Oklahoma to Richard and Bertha (née Murray) Self. A Native American, she was a member of the Citizen Potawatomi Nation. Taylor graduated from Boise State University.

== Political career ==
Taylor was elected to the Oregon House of Representatives in 1990, and served until 2000, when she was prevented from running for re-election because of term limits.

After stepping down from the Oregon Legislature, she was elected to the Citizen Potawatomi Nation Tribal Legislature as the representative from District 8, which includes Alaska, Washington, Oregon, Idaho, Montana, Wyoming, South Dakota, North Dakota, and Nebraska.

== Personal life ==
Taylor married Nelson Taylor in May 1952. After graduating from college, the couple lived in Boise, Idaho and Nampa, Idaho before moving to Astoria, Oregon in 1979. They owned and operated Johnson Drug in Warrenton, Oregon.

Taylor died of cancer on July 15, 2008, in Astoria, Oregon.

== See also ==
- List of Native American politicians
- Native American women in politics
