= Oregon's 4th Senate district =

American legislative district

Oregon's 4th Senate District as of September 27, 2021

District 4 of the Oregon State Senate comprises central Lane County centered around Eugene and Springfield. It is composed of Oregon House districts 7 and 8. It is currently represented by Democrat Floyd Prozanski of Eugene.

== Election results ==
District boundaries have changed over time, therefore, senators before 2021 may not represent the same constituency as today. From 1993 until 2003, the district covered eastern Washington County; from 2003 until 2013, it shifted to cover southern and eastern Lane County, including much of downtown Eugene, as well as northern Douglas County; and from 2013 until 2023, it stayed mostly the same while gaining some of southern Creswell and northern Roseburg.

The current district is substantially different from its previous iterations. It is substantially physically smaller and is centered around the downtowns of Eugene and Springfield while not containing any other incorporated cities.

The results are as follows:

Year	Candidate	Party	Percent	Opponent	Party	Percent	Opponent	Party	Percent
1984	Jim Simmons	Republican	60.0%	John Tyner	Democratic	40.0%	No third candidate		
1988	Paul Phillips	Republican	100.0%	Unopposed					
1992	Paul Phillips	Republican	53.5%	Michael Brewin	Democratic	46.5%	No third candidate		
1996	Eileen Qutub	Republican	53.2%	Patricia N. Biggs	Democratic	46.8%	No third candidate		
2000	Ryan Deckert	Democratic	52.0%	Eileen Qutub	Republican	45.7%	Pavel Goberman	Libertarian	2.2%
2002	Tony Corcoran	Democratic	58.6%	David Alsup	Republican	41.4%	No third candidate		
2004 (Note: Off-cycle election due to the resignation of Tony Corcoran to take a position on the state Employment Appeals Board.)	Floyd Prozanski	Democratic	60.6%	Norm Thomas	Republican	39.4%	No third candidate		
2006	Floyd Prozanski	Democratic	63.7%	Bill Eddie	Republican	36.3%	No third candidate		
2010	Floyd Prozanski	Democratic	57.7%	Marilyn Kittelman	Republican	42.1%	No third candidate		
2014	Floyd Prozanski	Democratic	58.0%	Cheryl Mueller	Republican	37.8%	William Bollinger	Libertarian	3.8%
2018	Floyd Prozanski	Democratic	59.2%	Scott Rohter	Republican	38.3%	Frank Lengele, Jr.	Libertarian	2.3%
2022	Floyd Prozanski	Democratic	81.7%	Eric Pinnell	Libertarian	17.6%	No third candidate		
