= Eileen Quiring O'Brien =

American politician

Chair of the Clark County Council
- In office January 1, 2019 – March 1, 2022
- Preceded by: Eric K. Holt
- Succeeded by: Karen Dill Bowerman

Member of the Clark County Council
- In office January 1, 2017 – March 1, 2022
- Preceded by: Constituency established
- Succeeded by: Richard Rylander
- Constituency: 4th district (2017–2019); At-large (2019–2022); 5th district (2022)

Member of the Oregon Senate from the 4th district
- In office January 13, 1997 – January 8, 2001
- Preceded by: Paul Phillips
- Succeeded by: Ryan Deckert

Member of the Oregon House of Representatives from the 8th district
- In office January 9, 1995 – January 13, 1997
- Preceded by: Mary Alice Ford
- Succeeded by: Ryan Deckert

Personal details
- Born: March 2, 1948 (age 78) York, Nebraska, U.S.
- Party: Republican
- Spouse: Timothy O'Brien
- Children: 5

Eileen Quiring O'Brien (born March 2, 1948), formerly Eileen Qutub, is an American politician who served as a member of the Clark County Council in the state of Washington from 2017 to 2022. A member of the Republican Party, she represented the 4th district of the council from 2017 to 2019, served as the chair of the council, represented the council's at-large district from 2019 to 2022, and the 5th district in 2022.

Quiring O'Brien was also a state legislator in Oregon. She served in the Oregon House of Representatives from 1995-1997 and the Oregon State Senate from 1997-2001 as Eileen Qutub. She ran for the 2012 Washington State Senate election as Eileen Qutub.
