= John Minnis =

American politician

Member of the Oregon House of Representatives from the 20th district
- In office 1985–1999
- Preceded by: Pat Gillis
- Succeeded by: Karen Minnis

Oregon State Senator
- In office 2001–2004

Personal details
- Born: December 14, 1953 (age 72)
- Party: Republican
- Spouse: Karen Minnis
- Profession: Politician, police officer

John Minnis (born December 14, 1953) is a former Republican legislator and police officer in the U.S. state of Oregon. He was a member of both houses of the Oregon Legislative Assembly, representing eastern Multnomah County. He and his wife Karen, who was Speaker of the Oregon House of Representatives in the mid-2000s, were at one time considered the "most powerful duo in the Oregon Legislature." From 2004 to 2009 he headed the Oregon Department of Public Safety Standards and Training.

== Early life ==
Minnis graduated Madison High School in Portland, Oregon. He and Karen met there, and were married in 1972. They had three children; Karen held several jobs while raising the family, putting John through college. He studied at Portland State University, Portland Bible College, and Eastern Oregon State University; he was also a jet mechanic for the United States Air Force and the Oregon Air Guard.

== Political career ==
Minnis was appointed to fill a seat in the Oregon House of Representatives in 1985, after fellow Republican Pat Gillis was recalled from office. He served there until 1999, co-chairing the Ways and Means Committee in 1993, and chairing the Judiciary Committee in 1997. Minnish left his seat in 1999 due to a term limits law. His wife, Karen, who had worked as his legislative aide for over a decade, won the seat he vacated.

John then won a seat in the Oregon State Senate in 2000. He was chair of the House Judiciary Committee in 1997 and of the Senate Judiciary Committee in 2001 and 2003. Minnis sponsored the controversial and unsuccessful Senate Bill 742, which sought to label certain acts of civil disobedience as terrorism, and impose stiff penalties.

Minnis's wife, Karen Minnis, was Speaker of the Oregon House for the two following sessions. The two were called the "most powerful duo in the Oregon Legislature" in a 2003 profile in the Eugene Register-Guard.

Minnis was a member of the Portland Police Bureau for 27 years. He was appointed director of the Oregon Department of Public Safety Standards and Training program by Governor Ted Kulongoski in 2004. He resigned from that post amid allegations of inappropriate behavior toward a female subordinate. The Oregon Attorney General's office stated it was unable to prove any illegal incidents took place in Oregon. In December 2009, the alleged victim announced plans to file a criminal complaint against Minnis in California.
