= Mark Simmons (politician) =

American politician and businessman

Member of the Oregon House of Representatives from the 58th District
- In office 1997–2003

62nd Speaker of the Oregon House of Representatives
- In office 2001–2003
- Preceded by: Lynn Snodgrass
- Succeeded by: Karen Minnis

Personal details
- Party: Republican
- Spouse: Joni
- Profession: Politician, businessman

Mark Simmons is an American politician who was a member of the Oregon House of Representatives from 1997–2002 and served as the 62nd Speaker of the Oregon House of Representatives.

== Early years ==
Simmons graduated from Elgin High School in 1975 and went straight to work for Boise Cascade. Before his election to the legislature, Simmons served as a board member of the Oregon Land Coalition.

== Political career ==
Simmons was first elected to the State House in 1996. He served as Majority Whip and Chairman of the Rules, Elections, and Public Affairs Committee.

In 2001, he was elected as the 62nd Speaker of the House, a position he held until 2003.

== Later life ==
In 2002, while still Speaker of the House, Simmons was hired as director of public affairs for the Oregon Association of Nurserymen. In 2005, Simmons was appointed as the Oregon State Director for USDA Rural Development.

Political offices
Preceded by Lynn Snodgrass	Speaker of the Oregon House of Representatives; 2001-2003	Succeeded by Karen Minnis
