= Brady L. Adams =

American banker and politician (1945–2015)

- State Senate President Brady Adams

53rd President of the Oregon State Senate
- In office 1997–2000
- Preceded by: Gordon H. Smith
- Succeeded by: Gene Derfler

Majority Leader of the Oregon State Senate
- In office 1995–1997
- Preceded by: Dick Springer
- Succeeded by: Gene Derfler

Member of the Oregon State Senate from the 25th district
- In office 1993–2000
- Preceded by: Ron Grensky
- Succeeded by: Jason Atkinson

Personal details
- Born: February 28, 1945 Vanport, Oregon, U.S.
- Died: April 6, 2015 (aged 70) Grants Pass, Oregon, U.S.
- Party: Republican
- Spouse: Patricia Anderson
- Profession: Banker

Brady Leonard Adams (February 28, 1945 – April 6, 2015) was an American politician and banker from Grants Pass. He served eight years in the Oregon State Senate from 1993 through 2000. Adams was a conservative Republican who represented two Southern Oregon counties in the state senate. He was President of the Oregon State Senate during the 1997 and 1999 legislative sessions. During his time in the legislature, Adams was known for his ability to work with the state's Democratic governor as well as his peers in the state legislature. Over the years, he also served on the board of directors for more than 20 non-profit organizations.

== Early life ==
Adams was born on February 28, 1945, in Vanport, Oregon, a community built next to the Columbia River during World War II to provide housing for Portland's shipyard workers. He grew up in poverty. His parents were migrant workers who moved frequently. In addition, his father was an alcoholic who was often absent from the family. His unstable early years helped instill in him a drive to use education to better his position in life.

Adams graduated from North Salem High School in 1963 and then went on to attend Portland State University. He worked his way through college, filling vending machines. In 1965, Adams married Patricia Jean Anderson in a wedding ceremony held in Salem, Oregon. Adams earned a bachelor's degree in marketing from Portland State, graduating in 1969.

Adams moved to Grants Pass in 1971, where he took a job as a loan officer at Evergreen Federal Savings and Loan. He quickly got involved in a wide variety of charitable activities and community projects, serving on the board of directors of many local non-profit groups. Over time, he proved to be a successful banker, becoming president of the Evergreen bank in 1988.

== State senator ==
Adams, a conservative Republican, was first elected to the Oregon State Senate in 1992. He served in the state senate for a total of eight years, completing his last term in 2000. During his tenure in the senate, he was widely recognized as a tough negotiator who worked with Oregon's Democratic governor, John Kitzhaber, and fellow legislators to find middle-ground compromises that resolved important contemporary issues.

In 1992, Adams had decided to run for the Oregon senate seat in District 25, representing parts of Jackson and Josephine counties in Southern Oregon. He faced Drenon Carlyle of Medford in the Republican primary while Rebecca Brown of Williams and Robert Lee of Grants Pass competed for the Democratic nomination for the seat. Adams won the Republican primary, while Brown became the Democratic nominee. In the general election, Adams easily beat Brown with a two-to-one majority; Adams received 27,376 votes against Brown's 13,904 votes. Adams was one of five new Republican senators elected that year.

Adams took his seat in the Oregon State Senate on January 11, 1993, representing District 25. He served through the 1993 regular legislative session which ended on August 5. Adams was appointed to three committees: housing and finance, business, and revenue and school finance. During the session, he criticized the Oregon Land Conservation and Development Department for ignoring local planning commissions. He opposed a bill to ban workplace smoking because he felt the penalties were too harsh. He also voted against a measure to create a state sales tax.

Since state senators served a four-year term, Adams did not have to run for re-election in 1994. Prior to the 1994 general election, the media reported that Adams would be a contender for a Republican leadership position when the state senate was organized for the 1995 legislative session. After the election, Republicans held a 19 to 11 majority in the Oregon State Senate. When senate Republicans organized after the election, they chose Adams as the senate majority leader.

The 1995 legislative session began on January 9 and lasted through June 10. During the session, Adams served as the majority leader, helping the President of the Senate, Gordon H. Smith, push the Republicans' legislative agenda. Adams also served in two special sessions that followed the 1995 regular session. The first special session began on July 28 and lasted through August 4. The second special session, in early 1996, lasted only two days, beginning on February 1 and adjourning the following day.

== President of the Senate ==
In 1996, Adams ran for a second four-year term in Oregon's state senate, again representing District 25. He had no opposition in either the Republican primary or the general election, so he was easily re-elected to a second term.

In the 1996 election, Republicans retained control of the state senate with a 20 to 10 majority. After the election, Republican senators selected Adams as their party leader and candidate for senate president. The 1997 session began on January 13. The following day, Adams was elected President of the Senate and sworn into office. As the session got underway, Adams made senate committee assignments. He also announced his legislative priorities for the session. Among other things, he said the Republican majority would focus on the state's budget process, education reform, and public financing for child care. He also said he would take action to give citizens more visibility into legislative decision making and government operations.

During the 1997 legislative session, Republicans held majorities in both the Oregon House of Representatives and the state senate. As a result, the Republican agenda was incorporated into numerous bills. However, the Democratic governor, John Kitzhaber, vetoed 43 of those bills. Nevertheless, last-minute negotiation between Adams and the governor produced compromises that allowed key legislation to be passed and signed into law. The 1997 legislative session ended on July 5 of that year.

After the 1997 legislative session ended, Adams appointed senators to 15 interim committees, each committee was assigned to study a key issue and prepare draft legislation for the 1999 legislative session to consider. Adams appointed himself to the interim committee studying budget reform.

Once again, his four-year senate term meant that Adams did not have to run for re-election prior to the 1999 legislative session. As a result, local media speculated that Adams might run for governor against the popular incumbent Democrat, John Kitzhaber. However, Adams decided not to run for governor. Instead, he endorsed fellow Republican Bill Sizemore, who was ultimately defeated by Kitzhaber in the 1998 general election.

When the 1999 legislative session began on January 13, Adams was once again elected President of the Senate. This time it was a unanimous vote, with both Republican and Democratic senators casting their votes for Adams. Adams had previously announced his choices for committee chairs, so the senate got off to a quick start. Adams announced that his top priority for the 1999 legislative session would be to pass a tax cut for middle-class families. Oregon's Democratic governor said he might support the tax cut depending on how the Republican legislature planned to replace the lost revenue. Despite early bipartisan rhetoric, the state education budget became a major sticking point for both Republicans and Democrats, with the Republican majorities in the Senate and House facing off against the Democratic minorities and the governor. Eventually, the Republicans set the governor's budget aside and offered a new budget plan. With the Republicans threatening to pass the state budget without any Democratic votes and the governor threatening to veto the Republican budget bill, which would have forced a special session to re-address the budget, Adams and the governor worked out a last-minute compromise that increased the education budget, ensured more accountability in the budget process, and preserved the governor's health care plan.

When the session finally adjourned on July 5, it was the third-longest legislative session in Oregon history. Despite the partisan bickering, over 1,200 bills were passed, the most ever. While the governor imposed a record number of vetoes, Republicans countered by referring a record number of issues to the people in the form of ballot measures. Adams successfully pushed through a tax cut in the form of an expansion of the child-care credit for middle and low-income families. He also got an increase in the state's federal income tax deduction incorporated into a ballot measure and ensured that any tax surplus would be refunded directly to Oregon taxpayers. After the session, the media highlighted Adams as the state's most capable leader, noting that he treated everyone in both parties with respect and championed compromises that were the key to getting things done in an otherwise contentious political environment.

Adams continued representing senate District 25 and served as President of the Senate until his four-year term ended in 2000. After the 1999 legislative session ended, he appointed senators to serve on various interim committees to study important issues prior to the next legislative session. He also served as co-chairman of the powerful Oregon Emergency Board, a statutory committee of the state legislature that functions in place of legislature when that body is out of session.

== Later life ==
Adams could not run for re-election in 2000 due to Oregon's term-limit law that was in effect at that time. After leaving the state senate, Adams went back to his banking business in Grants Pass. He also remained active in state and local politics and supported numerous community service groups across southern Oregon.

As president of Evergreen Federal Bank, Adams was an important business leader in Grants Pass. He was also well known around the state as a successful businessman. In 2007, he was inducted into the Oregon Bankers Hall of Fame. During the economic downturn in 2008, the federal government handed out $250 million to community banks around the country. Adams was opposed to this intervention, believing that it was an unnecessary corporate welfare program. To support this view, he noted that his bank had over 2,000 outstanding loans and only 3 borrowers were behind on their payments. Adams retired from Evergreen bank in 2010.

Adams also used his influence to improve the Grants Pass community. He founded BearFest in 2003, an annual event that is still a part of the Grants Pass civic calendar. BearFest features whimsical fiberglass bear statues placed around the town. Eventually, the bank sponsored the Evergreen Bear Hotel, which is used to store and display bear sculptures and other public artwork. It also provides space for local artists and community events. Over the years, Adams served on the board of directors for more than 20 non-profit organizations and led over 50 community projects in Grants Pass and the broader Josephine County area. On May 12, 2005, Grants Pass celebrated Brady Adams Day.

Adams suffered from Parkinson's disease in his later years. He died on April 6, 2015, in Grants Pass at the age of 70. Shortly after his death, his family held a private memorial and funeral service. Adams was interred at the Hillcrest Memorial Park Cemetery in Grants Pass. A public memorial for Adams was held in Grants Pass on May 2, 2015.

In 2016, the Oregon legislature passed a concurrent resolution recognizing Adams for his personal leadership and his many years of public service. A copy of the resolution was presented to the Adams family in March 2016. Today, a bronze statue of Adams is the central feature at the Grants Pass riverfront park. The restoration of the city's riverfront park was one of the many civic projects he led.
