= Jane Lokan =

American politician (1921–2020)

Member of the Oregon House of Representatives from the 25th district
- In office January 1995 – January 2001
- Preceded by: Dave McTeague
- Succeeded by: Carolyn Tomei

Personal details
- Born: September 10, 1921 Quincy, Oregon, United States
- Died: February 11, 2020 (aged 98) Milwaukie, Oregon, United States
- Resting place: Willamette National Cemetery
- Party: Republican
- Spouse: Albert Ellsworth Lokan
- Children: 5

Jane Elinor Lokan (1921–2020) was an American politician who served in the Oregon House of Representatives from 1995 to 2001, representing the 25th District, which at that time was the City of Milwaukie.

== Career ==
Lokan started her career after her husband was injured in combat. She got a full-time job at U.S. National Bank and then worked at Omark Industries. She became President of the Oregon Chapter of the Certified Professional Secretaries Association. It was at this time when she began her career in politics. She worked on Ronald Reagan's first run to the U.S. presidency, and became the chair and co-chair for the Tri-County and Clackamas County Campaign Committees for Presidents Reagan and Bush. She ran for State Representative three times before successfully winning after the retirement of Dave McTeague. After her time in the house, she served as Clackamas County Republican Party Chair from 2002 to 2004.

== Personal life ==
Lokan and her husband were active and devout Lutherans, and attended Milwaukie Lutheran Church where she worked as a church secretary.
