= Floyd Prozanski =

American politician

Member of the Oregon State Senate from the 4th district
- Incumbent
- Assumed office December 2003
- Preceded by: Tony Corcoran

Member of the Oregon House of Representatives from the 8th district
- In office January 2003 – December 2003
- Succeeded by: Paul Holvey

Member of the Oregon House of Representatives from the 40th district
- In office 1995–2000
- Preceded by: Carl Hosticka
- Succeeded by: Phil Barnhart

Personal details
- Born: 1954 (age 71–72)
- Party: Democratic
- Education: Texas A&M University, South Texas College of Law
- Occupation: Attorney

Floyd Prozanski (born 1954) is an American attorney and Democratic politician who has represented District 4 in the Oregon State Senate, which covers Eugene and Springfield, since 2004. He previously served in the Oregon House of Representatives from 1995 to 2000 and in 2003 to fill a vacancy. He chaired the Senate Judiciary Committee during the 2025 session.

== Early life and education ==
Prozanski graduated from Texas A&M University and earned a J.D. from South Texas College of Law. He has worked as an attorney, municipal prosecutor, and assistant district attorney.

== Career ==
=== Oregon House of Representatives ===
Prozanski was first elected to the Oregon legislature in 1994. He represented District 40 in the House from 1995 to 2000, and returned in 2003 as the representative for District 8.

=== Oregon Senate ===
In December 2003, Prozanski resigned from the House to accept appointment to the Senate seat vacated by Tony Corcoran. He won election to the seat in November 2004 and has been reelected ever since, most recently in 2026, when he was unopposed in the general election. In 2022 and 2026, he received both the Democratic and Republican primary nominations.

In the 2025 legislative session, Prozanski chaired the Senate Judiciary Committee and served on the Natural Resources and Wildfire and Human Services committees.

==== 2015 recall attempt ====
In 2015, Prozanski sponsored Senate Bill 941, which required background checks on private firearm sales and became law that May. Opponents of the bill filed a petition to recall him, but the effort fell about 200 signatures short of the 8,415 required to qualify for the ballot.

== Electoral history ==
2004 Oregon State Senator, 4th district
| Party | Candidate | Votes | % |
|---|---|---|---|
| Democratic | Floyd Prozanski | 38,211 | 61.4 |
| Republican | Norm Thomas | 23,871 | 38.4 |
| Write-in | | 140 | 0.2 |
| Total votes | | 62,222 | 100% |

2006 Oregon State Senator, 4th district
| Party | Candidate | Votes | % |
|---|---|---|---|
| Democratic | Floyd Prozanski | 30,402 | 63.6 |
| Republican | Bill Eddie | 17,327 | 36.2 |
| Write-in | | 96 | 0.2 |
| Total votes | | 47,825 | 100% |

2010 Oregon State Senator, 4th district
| Party | Candidate | Votes | % |
|---|---|---|---|
| Democratic | Floyd Prozanski | 29,077 | 58.0 |
| Republican | Marilyn Kittelman | 20,961 | 41.8 |
| Write-in | | 130 | 0.3 |
| Total votes | | 50,168 | 100% |

2014 Oregon State Senator, 4th district
| Party | Candidate | Votes | % |
|---|---|---|---|
| Democratic | Floyd Prozanski | 30,601 | 57.8 |
| Republican | Cheryl Mueller | 20,119 | 38.0 |
| Libertarian | William Bollinger | 2,010 | 3.8 |
| Write-in | | 176 | 0.3 |
| Total votes | | 52,906 | 100% |

2018 Oregon State Senator, 4th district
| Party | Candidate | Votes | % |
|---|---|---|---|
| Democratic | Floyd Prozanski | 38,623 | 59.1 |
| Republican | Scott Rohter | 25,031 | 38.3 |
| Libertarian | Frank L Lengele Jr | 1,530 | 2.3 |
| Write-in | | 117 | 0.2 |
| Total votes | | 65,301 | 100% |

2022 Oregon State Senator, 4th district
| Party | Candidate | Votes | % |
|---|---|---|---|
| Democratic | Floyd Prozanski | 43,219 | 81.7 |
| Libertarian | Eric Pinnell | 9,295 | 17.6 |
| Write-in | | 399 | 0.8 |
| Total votes | | 52,913 | 100% |
