= Lynn Snodgrass =

American politician

61st Speaker of the Oregon House of Representatives
- In office January 1999 – January 2001
- Preceded by: Lynn Lundquist
- Succeeded by: Mark Simmons

Member of the Oregon House of Representatives from the 10th district
- In office January 1995 – January 2001
- Preceded by: Ken Baker
- Succeeded by: Jan Lee

Personal details
- Born: 1951 (age 74–75) Oregon, U.S.
- Party: Republican
- Education: Oregon State University; Portland State University (BA)

Lynn Snodgrass (née Grenz; born c. 1951) is an American politician who served in the Oregon House of Representatives from 1995 to 2001. A Republican, she was Speaker of the Oregon House of Representatives from 1999 to 2001.

== Early life ==
Snodgrass was born in Oregon, growing up in Milwaukie. She attended Oregon State University, and earned an elementary teaching degree at Portland State University. She competed for the Miss Oregon crown in 1969, losing to Margie Elaine Huhta. She competed again, and was crowned Miss Oregon in 1971. In 1974, she married Drake Snodgrass. As of 1998, they owned a local nursery and landscaping company. They moved to Boring, Oregon in the early 1980s. She held a seat on the Damascus school board, and served on Portland's Metro Home Builder Association.

== Political career ==
Snodgrass' political involvement began when a bill advanced by then-Speaker Larry Campbell forced Boring's school district to merge with that of neighboring Gresham. Snodgrass was enraged by that and her daughter's increasing class size, and made her first run for the legislature in 1994, which she won.

She represented District 10, which included her home town of Boring as well as Clackamas, Happy Valley, Damascus, South Gresham, Estacada, and portions of Oregon City. It straddled Portland's urban growth boundary. She ascended quickly in the ranks of the Oregon House, as a result of the term limits that were in place in the late 1990s.

She supported sending the then-recently approved Oregon Death with Dignity Act back to voters, and pushed for a bill to recriminalize marijuana. She supported Senate Bill 600, an early version of Measure 37, and a bill requested by the Associated Oregon Industries that would have limited student activity fees for political purposes. The Oregon League of Conservation Voters asserted that she cast environmentally-friendly votes 7 percent of the time in the 1997 session, and 0% in 1995. She led the campaign to send Measure 65 to the voters in 1997.

Snodgrass was chosen Republican majority leader for the 1997 session.

Snodgrass tried to pass a law in 1997 that would have established April as "Christian Heritage Month." She is a religious woman, and holds early-morning bible studies in her home. She occasionally sang hymns with fellow legislator and friend Margaret Carter.

In 1998 she defeated Democratic challenger Mike Smith, who got only 35% of the vote.

In 1998, she was elected Speaker of the Oregon House of Representatives, succeeding fellow Republican Lynn Lundquist. At the time, many Republicans felt Lundquist was too accommodating to Democratic Governor John Kitzhaber. Snodgrass was the first Portland-area Speaker since Vera Katz, whose term in that position ended in 1991.

She drew support from the Oregon Right to Life PAC and the National Rifle Association of America.

A 1998 Willamette Week article questioned the accuracy of Snodgrass's understanding of how tax laws affected urban and rural school funding. The article asserted that Measure 5 of 1990 impacted Portland schools negatively, while benefitting schools like those in Snodgrass's district; and contrasted that fact with Snodgrass's assertion that her district's schools had suffered while Portland schools did not.

Kate Brown was elected Senate Minority Leader in the same year. Fellow Representative Chris Beck, a Democrat, noted that Snodgrass was the first Portland-area speaker in over 10 years, and expressed hope that she would rise above partisan politics and help solve the problems of Portland. Snodgrass was noted for strongly supporting an openly gay candidate for the House, Chuck Carpenter, over a more religious and conservative Republican (Bill Witt, who went on to win the election). She had a contentious relationship with her predecessor, Lynn Lundquist, over education funding.

Snodgrass ran unsuccessfully for Oregon Secretary of State in 2000. She was defeated by Democrat Bill Bradbury.

Since 2015, Snodgrass has been CEO of the Gresham Area Chamber of Commerce and Visitors Center.

== See also ==
- List of female speakers of legislatures in the United States

Political offices
Preceded by Lynn Lundquist	Speaker of the Oregon House of Representatives; 1999–2001	Succeeded by Mark Simmons
