= Anitra Rasmussen =

American politician

Member of the Oregon House of Representatives from the 11th district
- In office 1995–2001
- Preceded by: Tom Mason
- Succeeded by: Mary Nolan

Personal details
- Born: 1958 (age 67–68) Eugene, Oregon, U.S>
- Party: Democratic
- Education: University of Portland
- Occupation: Software instructor

Anitra Kitts Rasmussen (born 1958) is a former member of the Oregon House of Representatives who represented district 11. She served as a Democrat. Rasmussen attended the University of Portland where she graduated with a Bachelor of Arts in communications. Rasmussen served from 1995 to 2001, and was succeeded by Mary Nolan.

== Political career ==
Rasmussen defeated incumbent Tom Mason in the Democratic primary in 1995. Rasmussen was elected to the Oregon House of Representatives in 1995. In 1996, Rasmussen ran against Republican candidate Jim Pasero. Pasero received 8,977 votes while the incumbent Rasmussen received 15,713 votes. The next election, Rasmussen ran against Libertarian candidate Joshua R. Poulson and won with 16,064 votes, opposed to Poulson's 2,882 votes. She did not run for re-election in the 2000 Democratic primary. The Willamette Week criticized Rasmussen, writing, "Rasmussen is proof that liberal politics don't automatically translate into a high ranking."

During her tenure, Rasmussen was a member of the State and School Finance Committee, the Human Resources Ways and Means Committee, the Interim Revenue Committee, the Joint Trade and Economic Development Committee, the Joint Legislative Audit Committee, and was the chairperson of the Portland School District Talented and Gifted Advisory Committee. Rasmussen introduced House Bill 3442 in 1999 that would set up a trust fund to provide basic needs for low-income people using finances from the national tobacco settlement. The same year, Rasmussen also promoted a bill that would fine motorists or suspend their drivers licenses when they engaged in harassment or get out of their vehicle to threaten or harass pedestrians or other drivers after an incident.

== Other activities ==
In 2003, Covenant Network hired Rasmussen as a Director of Communications.

Political offices
Preceded by Tom Mason	Member of the Oregon House of Representatives from the 11th district 1995–2001	Succeeded by Mary Nolan
