= Terry Thompson (Oregon politician) =

American politician

Member of the Oregon House of Representatives from the 4th district
- In office 1995–2001
- Preceded by: Hedy Rijken
- Succeeded by: Alan Brown

Personal details
- Party: Democratic

Terry Thompson is an American politician who served in the Oregon House of Representatives as a Democrat, representing District 4 from 1995 to 2001.

Thompson was elected to the House in 1994 and re-elected in 1996 and 1998. In 2000 he ran for the Oregon State Senate in District 2 and was defeated. He later served as a county commissioner in Lincoln County, Oregon, and sought a fourth four-year term in 2014. A commercial fisherman, he joined the state's Ocean Policy Advisory Council in 2004 and became its longest-serving member before resigning from it.
