= Lynn Lundquist =

American politician (1934–2013)

60th Speaker of the Oregon House of Representatives
- In office 1997–1999
- Preceded by: Beverly Clarno
- Succeeded by: Lynn Snodgrass
- Constituency: Powell Butte

Member of the Oregon House of Representatives from the 59th district
- In office 1995–2001
- Preceded by: Michael Payne
- Succeeded by: Greg Smith

Personal details
- Born: November 3, 1934
- Died: April 9, 2013 (aged 78) Powell Butte, Oregon
- Party: Republican
- Spouse: Barbara

Lynwood Rowe Lundquist (November 3, 1934 – April 9, 2013) was an American politician and businessman.

Lundquist graduated from Oregon State University and received his masters from University of Connecticut. He also served in the United States Army. Lundquist served in the Oregon House of Representatives 1994-1998 as a Republican. From 1997 to 1998, he served as Speaker of the Oregon House of Representatives. After his term, Lundquist headed the Oregon Business Association and retired in 2007.
