= Jeff Kruse =

American politician (born 1951)

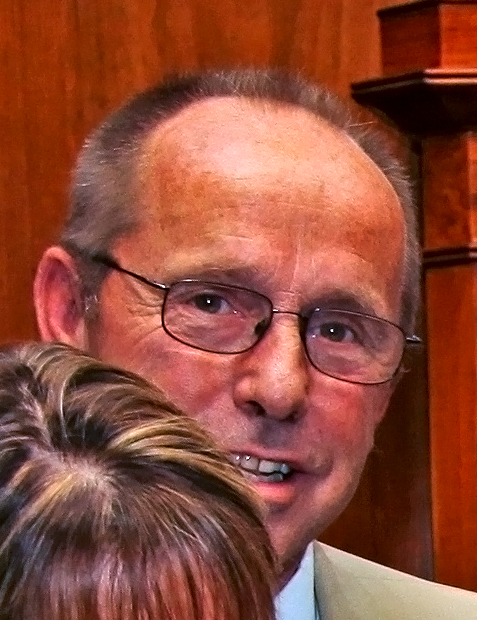

Member of the Oregon State Senate from the 1st district
- In office January 2005 – March 15, 2018
- Preceded by: Bill Fisher
- Succeeded by: Dallas Heard

Member of the Oregon House of Representatives from the 45th (to 2002), later 7th district
- In office January 1997 – January 2005
- Preceded by: Bill Fisher
- Succeeded by: Bruce Hanna

Personal details
- Born: September 7, 1951 (age 75) Oregon
- Party: Republican
- Education: Willamette University
- Occupation: Farmer

Jeff Kruse (born September 7, 1951) is a former Republican member of the Oregon Senate, representing the 1st District from 1996 until his resignation for sexual harassment in 2018.

== Committees ==
Kruse formerly sat on the following Senate Committees:

- Education and General Government, Vice Chair
- Health and Human Services, Vice Chair
- Public Education Appropriation, Member
- Services to Seniors and People with Disabilities, Vice Chair

== Native American mascot controversy ==
In July 2013, Kruse gained national attention by appearing in a CNN video news story about a bill he sponsored. His bill would reverse an existing Oregon law requiring public schools to remove what some colleagues consider "racist" and "insensitive" references to Native Americans on their sports team's uniforms. Prior to the enactment of the 2012 Oregon law, the State Superintendent of Schools had determined that the continued use of Native American mascots has created a "hostile educational environment". Schools have been given until 2017 to comply with the required change. In defending his bill, Kruse has asked: "do we change the entire world for the small few [sic]? He graduated from Roseburg High School whose mascot is "the Indians". This mascot is frequently depicted in cartoons as clownish or as a charging warrior. The images have offended citizens of Native American descent and caused local controversy.

== Sexual harassment allegations ==
In October 2017, Kruse was removed from all of his Senate committee assignments by Senate President Peter Courtney. An article in The Oregonian indicated that Kruse had been accused of inappropriate touching and had failed to resolve ongoing workplace issues.

The removal came days after Senator Sara Gelser indicated that Kruse had inappropriately touched her. Senator Ginny Burdick supported Gelser's allegations, calling Kruse's behavior a "chronic problem", recalling an incident where she had to tell Kruse to get his hands off of Gelser and another incident where Kruse had inappropriately touched a female staffer on the Senate floor.

Kruse's smoking violations in his Capitol office were also a factor in the sanctions. He categorically denied any inappropriate behavior while acknowledging that "the smoking still is an issue that I will not deny."

On February 9, 2018, Kruse announced his resignation, to take effect March 15, 2018.

On April 17, 2018 fellow member of the Douglas County delegation Dallas Heard succeeded Kruse as State Senator for the Oregon State Senate 1st District.

== Electoral history ==
2004 Oregon State Senator, 1st district
Party	Candidate	Votes	%
Republican	Jeff Kruse	38,866	65.9
Democratic	Bruce W. Cronk	19,992	33.9
Write-in		103	0.2
Total votes		58,961	100%

2008 Oregon State Senator, 1st district
Party	Candidate	Votes	%
Republican	Jeff Kruse	38,366	69.7
Democratic	Eldon Rollins	16,461	29.9
Write-in		229	0.4
Total votes		55,056	100%

2012 Oregon State Senator, 1st district
Party	Candidate	Votes	%
Republican	Jeff Kruse	40,361	71.4
Democratic	Eldon Rollins	16,062	28.4
Write-in		121	0.2
Total votes		56,544	100%

2016 Oregon State Senator, 1st district
Party	Candidate	Votes	%
Republican	Jeff Kruse	45,775	73.4
Democratic	Timm Rolek	16,476	26.4
Write-in		106	0.2
Total votes		62,357	100%
