= Neil Bryant =

American politician

Member of the Oregon State Senate from the 27th district
- In office 1992–2000
- Preceded by: Peter M. Brockman
- Succeeded by: Bev Clarno

Personal details
- Party: Republican
- Spouse: Mary Arnstad (m. 1969)
- Education: Pacific Lutheran University (BA); Willamette University (JD)

Neil Bryant is an American politician and attorney who served as a member of the Oregon State Senate from 1992 to 2000. A member of the Republican Party, Bryant represented Oregon's 27th Senate district.

== Background ==
Bryant was raised in Salem, Oregon. He earned a Bachelor of Arts degree from Pacific Lutheran University and a Juris Doctor from the Willamette University College of Law. As an undergraduate, Bryant played on the football team. While at Pacific Lutheran, Bryant met his wife, Mary (née Arnstad). They married in 1969.

After graduating from law school, Bryant worked as an attorney in Bend, Oregon at a law firm founded by Jay H. Upton. Bryant was elected to the Oregon State Senate in 1992. Since leaving office, Bryant has worked as an attorney and partner at Bryant, Lovlien & Jarvis, PC.

Bryant also served on the Oregon Higher Education Coordinating Commission.
