= Bev Clarno =

American politician (born 1936)

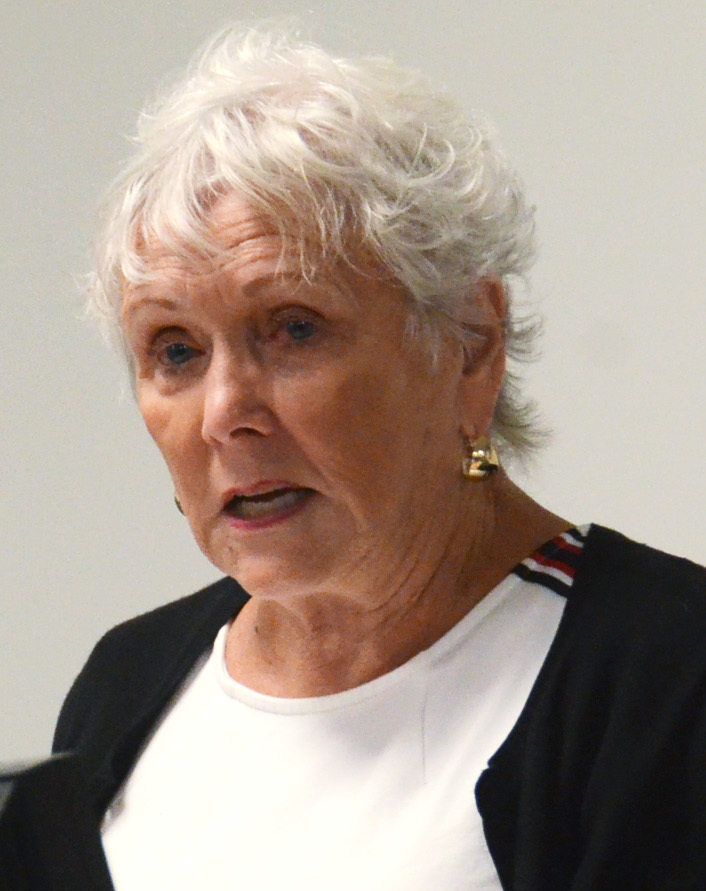
- Clarno in 2019

27th Secretary of State of Oregon
- In office March 31, 2019 – January 4, 2021
- Governor: Kate Brown
- Preceded by: Leslie Cummings (acting)
- Succeeded by: Shemia Fagan

Member of the Oregon State Senate from the 27th district
- In office January 2001 – August 1, 2003
- Preceded by: Neil Bryant
- Succeeded by: Ben Westlund

59th Speaker of the Oregon House of Representatives
- In office January 9, 1995 – January 13, 1997
- Preceded by: Larry Campbell
- Succeeded by: Lynn Lundquist

Member of the Oregon House of Representatives from the 55th district
- In office January 1989 – January 1997
- Preceded by: Bill C. Bellamy
- Succeeded by: Ben Westlund

Personal details
- Born: March 29, 1936 (age 90) Langlois, Oregon, U.S.
- Party: Republican
- Education: Marylhurst University (BA)
- Bev Clarno's voice Clarno talks about how she met her husband, Ray; Recorded August 6, 2019

Beverly A. Clarno (born March 29, 1936) is an American politician who served as the 27th Oregon Secretary of State from 2019 to 2021. She was the only Republican statewide official in Oregon at the time. Clarno previously served as a member of the Oregon House of Representatives and Oregon State Senate. As of 2024, she is the most recent Republican to have held statewide office in Oregon.

== Early life and education ==
Clarno was born in Langlois, Oregon. She earned a Bachelor of Arts degree from Marylhurst University.

== Career ==
Clarno was elected to the Oregon House of Representatives in 1989. She became Speaker of the House in 1995, succeeding Larry Campbell. She served in the House until 1996, opting to instead run for Oregon State Treasurer, though she was defeated by incumbent Democrat Jim Hill.

In 2000, she was elected to the Oregon State Senate, where she served one term. She resigned on August 1, 2003 to take a position with the George W. Bush administration as a regional representative for the United States Department of Health and Human Services.

Governor Kate Brown appointed Clarno as Oregon Secretary of State to complete the term of Dennis Richardson following his death in 2019. Brown announced that she was only interested in appointing a successor to Richardson who wanted the day-to-day responsibilities of the office and would not run for election to a full term, a condition to which Clarno agreed upon her appointment. As Oregon does not have a Lieutenant governor position, the Secretary of State serves in a similar role and is first in the line of succession to the governor. As Clarno was an appointee, however, she was ineligible to become Governor, leaving State Treasurer Tobias Read next in the line of succession until Shemia Fagan assumed office on January 4, 2021.

== See also ==
- List of speakers of the Oregon House of Representatives

Political offices
Preceded by Larry Campbell	Speaker of the Oregon House of Representatives; 1995–1997	Succeeded by Lynn Lundquist
Preceded by Leslie Cummings; Acting	Secretary of State of Oregon; 2019–2021	Succeeded by Shemia Fagan
