= Bill Fisher (politician) =

American politician (1936–2020)

Member of the Oregon House of Representatives from the 45th district
- In office January 11, 1993 – January 13, 1997
- Preceded by: Ron Johnson
- Succeeded by: Jeff Kruse

Member of the Oregon State Senate from the 1st 23rd district
- In office January 11, 1999 – January 8, 2007
- Preceded by: Joan Dukes
- Succeeded by: Jeff Kruse

Personal details
- Born: 1936 Washington, USA
- Died: August 17, 2020 (aged 83–84) Reno, Nevada, USA
- Party: Republican
- Spouse: Darlene Fisher
- Children: 4

Bill Fisher (1936–2020) was a former Republican member of the Oregon Legislature, representing Roseburg across many districts.

== Early life ==
Fisher was born in Eastern Washington in 1936, to Bill and Dorothy Fisher.

== Career ==
In 1958, Fisher enlisted in the US Army and served as a dental assistant and supply clerk. After his time in the military, he started a nursing home before beginning his political career.

Fisher first ran for the Oregon state legislature, representing the 23rd district, in 1988, though he lost the election. He was elected to represent the 45th district in the House of Representatives from 1992 to 1994, then to represent the 23rd district in the Oregon State Senate from 1996 to 2002. For his final campaign in 2002, he was redistricted to represent the first district. He worked on health care, agriculture, and the timber industry.

== Personal life ==
Fisher moved to Roseburg, Oregon in 1968, then to Salem in 2006 and later to Reno, Nevada.

Fisher was married to Darlene Fisher and had four children. He owned a biplane, and was a Christian.

Fisher died in Reno, Nevada on August 17, 2020.
