= Oregon's 25th Senate district =

American legislative district

Oregon's 25th Senate District as of September 27, 2021

District 25 of the Oregon State Senate comprises parts of Multnomah County centered around the city of Gresham. The district is composed of Oregon House districts 49 and 50. It is currently represented by Democrat Chris Gorsek of Troutdale.

== Election results ==
District boundaries have changed over time. Therefore, senators before 2021 may not represent the same constituency as today. From 1993 until 2003, the district covered parts of Southern Oregon; from 2003 until 2013, it moved to the greater Gresham area; and from 2013 until 2023, it grew to encompass Troutdale.

The current district is very similar to its previous iterations. Its southern border has shifted slightly to follow SE 190th Drive and the Mt. Hood Highway to Multnomah County's southern border with Clackamas County.

The results are as follows:

Year	Candidate	Party	Percent	Opponent	Party	Percent	Opponent	Party	Percent
1984	Bill Olson	Republican	52.7%	Eugene Potts	Democratic	47.3%	No third candidate		
1988	Ronald D. Grensky	Republican	62.5%	Albert H. Densmore	Democratic	37.5%	No third candidate		
1992	Brady Adams	Republican	67.2%	Rebecca Brown	Democratic	32.8%	No third candidate		
1996	Brady Adams	Republican	100.0%	Unopposed					
2000	Jason Atkinson	Republican	100.0%	Unopposed					
2004	Laurie Monnes Anderson	Democratic	53.1%	Ron Sunseri	Republican	46.9%	No third candidate		
2008	Laurie Monnes Anderson	Democratic	58.4%	Dave Kim	Republican	41.2%	No third candidate		
2012	Laurie Monnes Anderson	Democratic	53.3%	Scott Hansen	Republican	44.1%	Eugene A. Newell	Libertarian	2.4%
2016	Laurie Monnes Anderson	Democratic	55.1%	Tamie Tlustos-Arnold	Republican	40.7%	Jeffrey Ricks	Libertarian	4.0%
2020	Chris Gorsek	Democratic	51.9%	Justin Hwang	Republican	48.0%	No third candidate		
2024	Chris Gorsek	Democratic	55.9%	Raymond E Love	Republican	43.8%	No third candidate		
