= Ryan Deckert =

American politician

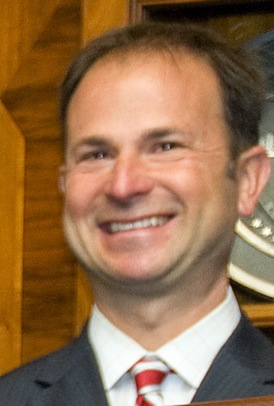

Member of the Oregon Senate from the 14th district
- In office 2001–2007
- Preceded by: Eileen Qutub
- Succeeded by: Mark Hass

Member of the Oregon House of Representatives from the 8th district
- In office 1997–2001
- Preceded by: Eileen Qutub
- Succeeded by: Mark Hass

Personal details
- Born: 1971 (age 54–55)
- Party: Democratic
- Spouse: Inga

Ryan Deckert (born c. 1971) is the president of the Oregon Business Association. Prior to this position, Deckert, a Democratic politician from the US state of Oregon, served in the Oregon Senate, representing District 14, which includes parts of Beaverton and the Portland neighborhoods of Garden Home and Raleigh Hills.

== Early life and career ==
Deckert grew up in Beaverton and graduated from Beaverton High School before receiving a bachelor of arts degree from the University of Oregon. He later worked as a development director at Hewlett-Packard and for an architecture firm.

== Political career ==
In November 1996, Deckert was elected to the Oregon House of Representatives representing District 8 in Beaverton, becoming, at the age of 25, the youngest member of that year's legislative session; he took office in January 1997. He was re-elected to the position in 1998, defeating Republican Henri Schauffler, with support from a coalition of moderate Republicans led by Mary Alice Ford. In 2000, he ran for the Oregon Senate, defeating Republican incumbent Eileen Qutub.

Deckert resigned from the Senate in October 2007 to become the president of the Oregon Business Association.

Deckert ran for Chair of the Washington County Commission in 2018, but lost.

== Personal ==
Deckert and his wife Inga live in Beaverton, Oregon and have three daughters.
