= Tony Corcoran (politician) =

Member of the Oregon House of Representatives
- In office January 9, 1995 – October 2003
- Preceded by: Sam Dominy
- Succeeded by: Floyd Prozanski
- Constituency: 44th house, 22nd senate, 4th senate

Personal details
- Born: 1949 (age 76–77) County Cork, Ireland
- Party: Democratic
- Spouse: Jeannie Merrick

Anthony Austin Corcoran is a politician and union leader from the U.S. state of Oregon. He served as a member of the Oregon House of Representatives, representing parts of Douglas and Lane counties.

== Life ==
Corcoran was born in 1949 in County Cork, Ireland an orphan. He was adopted aged 3 and was raised by American parents from Roswell, New Mexico and graduated high school in 1967. He attended University of San Francisco on a scholarship. He dropped out after 2 years to work at the American Can Company, where he became a member of the United Steelworkers union. He moved to Oakridge, Oregon in 1977, where he built homes, as a state welfare worker, and as a prison officer. He was the leader of the Oregon Public Employees Union when it started its 1987 statewide strike. He worked with future congressman Peter DeFazio and labor leader and state representative Sam Dominy. He credits them as mentors who influenced him to run for office. In his second term, he was designated Democratic whip. Corcoran worked on tax and labor policy, citing his union work as experience and motivation. He opposed energy deregulation. He was a noted member of the progressive wing of the Oregon Democratic party. He cited persecution in his union job as a factor for taking the appointment, which cut 2 years off of his term. Corcoran was first elected to the house in 1994 to the 44th district. He was reelected in 1996. He was elected to the 22nd senate district in 1998. He was redistricted to the 4th district and elected to the senate in 2000. He was reelected in the 2002 election. He resigned in October 2003 to take a seat on the Oregon Employment Appeals Board, appointed by Governor Kulongoski.

== Writing ==
Corcoran has written the guest viewpoint columns "Insider Baseball" (while serving the legislature) and "Hot Air Society" for the Eugene Weekly.
