= Gene Derfler =

American politician (1924–2026)

Member of the Oregon House of Representatives from the 31st district
- In office 1988–1994

Member of the Oregon Senate from the 16th district
- In office 1994–2002

Personal details
- Born: May 24, 1924 Portland, Oregon, U.S.
- Died: March 16, 2026 (aged 101) Salem, Oregon, U.S.
- Party: Republican
- Spouse: Thelma
- Children: 3
- Education: Western Washington University; Pensacola Naval Aviator School
- Profession: Broker

Military service
- Branch: United States Navy
- Conflict: World War II; Battle of the Atlantic

Eugene Leo Derfler (May 24, 1924 – March 16, 2026) was an American politician who was a member of the Oregon House of Representatives and Oregon State Senate. He was the last Republican to serve as Senate President.

== Early life ==
Derfler was born on May 24, 1924, in Portland, Oregon. He was a graduate from Western Washington College of Education (now Western Washington University) and the Pensacola Naval Aviator School. During World War II, Derfler flew PBY Catalina Bombers over the Atlantic Ocean from Florida to search for German Submarines in the Battle of the Atlantic, serving as a Lieutenant in the navy from 1943 to 1946. After the war, he moved to West Salem where he operated NICO Furniture, before getting into politics to reform the workers compensation system.

== Political career ==
In 1988, Derfler ran for the Oregon House of Representatives, winning the November election as a Republican for District 31 in Salem. After re-election to the seat in 1990 and 1992, he moved to the Oregon Senate after winning election in 1994, where he remained until 2001. Derfler represented District 16 in the Senate. He was a real estate broker at Coldwell Banker Mountain West Real Estate. While in the Senate he served two sessions as the majority leader for the Republican Party, and during his last session in the Senate in 2001, he was the Senate President, the last Republican to hold that position.

== Personal life and death ==
Derfler married Thelma Marie Derfler around 1945; they had three children together. He was honored as a guest in the Oregon Senate in February 2024, at age 99. He turned 100 on May 24, 2024, and died on March 16, 2026, aged 101, at a retirement home in Salem.
