= Oregon's 1st Senate district =

American legislative district

Oregon's 1st Senate District as of September 27, 2021

District 1 of the Oregon State Senate comprises all of Curry County as well as southern Coos County and central Douglas County. It is composed of Oregon House districts 1 and 2. It is currently represented by Republican David Brock Smith of Port Orford, who was appointed to the seat on January 11, 2023 after the resignation of Dallas Heard.

== Election results ==
District boundaries have changed over time. Therefore, senators before 2021 may not represent the same constituency as today. From 1993 until 2003, the district covered part of Northwest Oregon; from 2003 through 2013, it covered a similar region as today plus northern parts of Jackson and Josephine counties; and from 2013 through 2023, it covered the same areas as previously mentioned while adding more territory in western Josephine county. The current district adds more of eastern Douglas County compared to the previous iteration while losing southern Douglas County as well as all parts of Jackson and Josephine counties previously included in the district.

The results are as follows:

Year	Candidate	Party	Percent	Opponent	Party	Percent	Opponent	Party	Percent
1982	Charles Hanlon	Democratic	53.1%	Ted Bugas	Republican	47.1%	No third candidate		
1986	Joan Dukes	Democratic	51.7%	Geoffrey F. Stone	Republican	40.3%	Michael T. Boothby	Nonpartisan	8.0%
1990	Joan Dukes	Democratic	67.0%	Sykes Mitchell	Republican	33.0%	No third candidate		
1994	Joan Dukes	Democratic	100.0%	Unopposed					
1998	Joan Dukes	Democratic	84.5%	Linc Jordan	Libertarian	15.5%	No third candidate		
2004	Jeff Kruse	Republican	66.2%	Bruce W. Cronk	Democratic	33.8%	No third candidate		
2008	Jeff Kruse	Republican	69.7%	Eldon Rollins	Democratic	29.9%	No third candidate		
2012	Jeff Kruse	Republican	71.4%	Eldon Rollins	Democratic	28.4%	No third candidate		
2016	Jeff Kruse	Republican	73.4%	Timm Rolek	Democratic	26.4%	No third candidate		
2018 (Note: Off-cycle election due to the resignation of Jeff Kruse. Dallas Heard was the incumbent as he was appointed to the seat.)	Dallas Heard	Republican	64.2%	Shannon Souza	Democratic	35.6%	No third candidate		
2020	Dallas Heard	Republican	68.6%	Kat Stone	Democratic	31.2%	No third candidate		
2024	David Brock Smith	Republican	70.8%	Lupe Preciado-McAlister	Democratic	28.9%	No third candidate		
