= Frank Shields (politician) =

American politician and minister (born 1945)

Member of the Oregon Senate from the 24th district
- In office 1999–2007
- Preceded by: Randy Leonard
- Succeeded by: Rod Monroe

Member of the Oregon House of Representatives
- In office 1993–1999

Personal details
- Born: March 26, 1945 (age 81) New Castle, Pennsylvania, United States
- Party: Democratic
- Education: Drew University

Frank W. Shields (born March 26, 1945) is an American politician and Methodist minister who served in both houses of the Oregon Legislative Assembly, from 1993 until 2007.

== Biography ==
Shields was born in New Castle, Pennsylvania in 1945.

He served as chair of the Multnomah County Charter Review Committee from 1983 until 1984. Shields was elected to the Oregon House of Representatives in 1992 and to the Oregon Senate in 1998. In 2006, after initially filing for reelection, Shields withdrew from the race, citing health issues.

== Personal life ==
Shields is married to his wife, Becca. He has 2 children: Matthew and Noel, and 2 stepchildren: Trish and Nina.
