= Lenn Hannon =

American politician

Lenn Hannon (July 4, 1943 – April 1, 2010) was the second-longest-serving state senator in the history of the U.S. state of Oregon. He held office from 1974 to 2003, switching from the Democratic to the Republican party in 1980. He represented Oregon's 26th district, in southern Jackson County. His political career began when he defeated Republican Lynn Newbry in 1974 by just 37 votes. He earned the nickname "Landslide Lenny" for squeaking by this and other votes.

In late 2003, after retiring from the Senate, Hannon was appointed to the Oregon state parole board by Gov. Ted Kulongoski.

Hannon was born in Roseburg, Oregon, and served in the U.S. Army from 1961 to 1967. He attained the rank of Sergeant serving in the Oregon National Guard. He attended Ashland High School, Southern Oregon University, and was a student at Southern Oregon State College in 1963–1964, concurrent with his time in the Army. Hannon Library at Southern Oregon University is named for him. Hannon died in Salem, Oregon.

He was awarded an Outstanding Young Man of America award by the U.S. Jaycees in 1974.
