= Joan Dukes (politician) =

American politician

Member of the Oregon Senate from the 1st and 16th district
- In office January 12, 1987 – January 15, 2005
- Preceded by: Charles Hanlon
- Succeeded by: Betsy Johnson
- Constituency: 1st district (1987-2003); 16th district (2003-2005)

Personal details
- Born: 1947 or 1948 Tacoma, WA, U.S.
- Died: April 6, 2020 (aged 72)
- Party: Democratic

Joan Dukes (1947 or 1948 – April 6, 2020) was an American politician who served as a member of the Oregon State Senate from the 1st and 16th districts from 1987 to 2005, representing northwest Oregon. She was a member of the Democratic Party.

== Career ==
Dukes worked as Clatsop County Elections Supervisor from 1981 to 1983. She then served a term on the Clatsop County board of commissioners from 1983 to 1987. Dukes was elected to Oregon's 1st Senate district in 1986 and was reelected in 1990, 1994, and 1998. In 2002, she was redistricted into Oregon's 16th Senate district and won reelection there.

In the Senate, Dukes advocated for a diverse set of issues, including transportation, pain management, and commercial fishing.

Dukes resigned from the Senate in 2005, after being appointed to the Northwest Power and Conservation Council by Governor Ted Kulongowski. At the time of her resignation, she was the Oregon Senate's longest-serving current member.

Dukes died on April 6, 2020, at the age of 72.
