= Bill Currier (politician) =

American politician

Chair of the Oregon Republican Party
- In office February 28, 2015 – February 20, 2021
- Preceded by: Art Robinson
- Succeeded by: Dallas Heard

Personal details
- Political party: Republican
- Spouse: Becky
- Children: 5
- Education: Pacific Union College; Southern Oregon University

William Currier is an American politician and businessman who served as Mayor of Adair Village, Oregon. He formerly served as Chairman of the Oregon Republican Party.

== Early life and education ==
Currier was born and raised in Oregon. He studied business at Pacific Union College and computer information systems at Southern Oregon University.

== Career ==
Before his political career, Currier worked as a police officer. Currier began his political career as a precinct committeeman. He formerly served as chair of the Benton County Republican Party, Treasurer for the Party Affiliate for Oregon's 5th congressional district, and Vice-Chair of the Oregon Republican Party. In 2007, Currier was elected as mayor of Adair Village, Oregon. Currier is also currently the co-owner of TRACO Network Services, a computer training and consulting company, and SYNERGY Technology Partners, an information technology management organization.

Currier served as an Oregon delegate to the 2016 Republican National Convention and 2020 Republican National Convention. On 19 January 2021, two weeks after the controversial January 6th events in Washington DC, Currier in a press release of the Oregon Republican Party expressed "condemnation of the profound betrayal by the ten House Republicans who supported impeaching President Trump last week." In response, Oregon House Republicans issued a sharp dissenting statement that "there is no credible evidence to support false flag claims" made in the 19 January press release, while Senator Tim Knopp, Republican of Bend, stated that he does "not support the Oregon Republican Party's resolution." Currier reaffirmed the controversial resolution. One day after the Oregon Republican party leadership passed a resolution promoting the false flag theory, Knute Buehler, a former Oregon House member and 2018 Republican nominee for governor, "filed to change his registration from Republican to independent. 'It was very painful', he said." According to the Oregon Secretary of State's office, 6,145 people left the Republican Party in January 2021. Currier lost a bid for re-election as Chair to far-right State Senator Dallas Heard on February 20, 2021.

== Personal life ==
Currier and his wife, Becky, have five children.

Party political offices
| Preceded by Art Robinson | Chair of the Oregon Republican Party; 2015–2021 | Succeeded by Dallas Heard |
