= Senator Linthicum =

Senator Linthicum may refer to:

- Dennis Linthicum (born 1956), Oregon State Senate
- John Charles Linthicum (1867–1932), Maryland State Senate
