= Justin Hwang =

American politician (born 1984)

Chair of the Oregon Republican Party
- In office July 6, 2022 – February 22, 2025
- Preceded by: Herman Baertschiger Jr. (acting)
- Succeeded by: Jerry Cummings

Personal details
- Born: 1984 (age 41–42) South Korea
- Party: Republican
- Education: Cornell University (BA)

Justin Hwang (born 1984) is an American restaurateur and politician from Oregon who served as chair of the Oregon Republican Party from 2022 until 2025. He is the first Asian American and Korean American to serve in the position. He previously served briefly as the vice chair from May to July of the same year. Hwang previously made unsuccessful bids for election to the Oregon House of Representatives and Oregon State Senate in 2018 and 2020, respectively.

== Personal life and business career ==
Hwang immigrated to the United States from South Korea as a child and obtained American citizenship in 2006. He is the founder of Joy Teriyaki, a restaurant chain in the Portland metropolitan area, and operator of the Fairview Food Plaza. Hwang has lived in east Multnomah County since 2003.

== Oregon politics ==
=== Candidacies ===
Hwang ran in both the 2018 Oregon House of Representatives election and the 2020 Oregon State Senate election, losing both times to state senator and former state representative Chris Gorsek. Hwang accused incumbent Gorsek as using anti-immigrant language in a mailer sent to voters in 2018. In his 2020 state senate campaign, he was running to represent Oregon's 25th Senate district and focused on school funding for Mt. Hood Community College.

=== Oregon Republican Party ===
Hwang became the chair of the Oregon Republican Party in July 2022 after briefly serving as the vice chair since May 2022. His incumbency was preceded by several resignations from positions within the state party, including state senator Dallas Heard and former state senator and Josephine County commissioner Herman Baertschiger, who resigned from the position in early 2022. As chair, Hwang had been critical of both Oregon governor Kate Brown and U.S. president Joe Biden regarding the 2021–2023 inflation surge.

Following the Standoff at Eagle Pass, Hwang signed a letter in support of Texas Governor Greg Abbott's decision in the conflict.

Hwang declined to seek re-election and was replaced by Jerry Cummings.

== Electoral history ==
2018 Oregon State Representative, 49th district
Party	Candidate	Votes	%
Democratic	Chris Gorsek	11,045	51.3
Republican	Justin Hwang	9,658	44.8
Libertarian	Heather Ricks	826	3.8
Write-in		21	0.1
Total votes		21,550	100%

2020 Oregon State Senator, 25th district
Party	Candidate	Votes	%
Democratic	Chris Gorsek	30,206	51.9
Republican	Justin Hwang	27,882	47.9
Write-in		76	0.1
Total votes		58,164	100%

Party political offices
Preceded by Herman Baertschiger Jr. Acting	Chair of the Oregon Republican Party; 2022–2025	Succeeded by Jerry Cummings
