= Connie Whelchel =

American politician

Chair of the Oregon Republican Party
- Incumbent
- Assumed office April 9, 2025
- Preceded by: Jerry Cummings

Personal details
- Party: Democratic (before 2015); Republican (2015–present)
- Education: Linn-Benton Community College (attended); Western Oregon University (BA); University of Phoenix (MBA)

Connie Whelchel is an American politician and businesswoman currently serving as chair of the Oregon Republican Party since April 9, 2025, replacing Jerry Cummings after his resignation. She had previously served as vice-chair from February to April 2025, and as vice-chair of the Deschutes County Republican Party.

== Early life and education ==
Whelchel was born and raised in Oregon. She attended Linn–Benton Community College and received a bachelor's degree in psychology and master of business administration.

== Career ==
Whelchel is a compensation risk advisor in the commercial insurance industry. She has previously worked as an operations director at a medical clinic, marketing agent and event coordinator, and as a personal assistant.

=== Political career ===
In 2020, Whelchel began protesting Oregon's COVID-19 lockdowns in Downtown Bend. In 2021, she began becoming active in politics and was appointed a Republican precinct committeewoman, and later precinct captain. In 2021, she was elected vice-chair of the Deschutes County Republican Party, and was re-elected in 2024. In September 2023, she was appointed GOTV chair of the Oregon Republican Party. She was a delegate to the 2024 Republican National Convention, casting her vote for Donald Trump. She was asked by friends and acquaintances to run for an officer position in the Oregon Republican Party, and was elected vice-chair on February 22, 2025.

On April 9, 2025, she succeeded Jerry Cummings as chair of the Oregon Republican Party due to his resignation amid a sex abuse scandal involving him and his ex-wife.

== Personal life ==
Whelchel identifies as a centrist, and was formerly a Democrat. She cites the Democratic Party's shift to the far left and lack of action in regards to the state's issues with the reason she became a Republican.

Party political offices
Preceded by Jerry Cummings	Chair of the Oregon Republican Party; 2025–present	Incumbent
