= Herman Baertschiger Jr. =

American politician

Herman Baertschiger
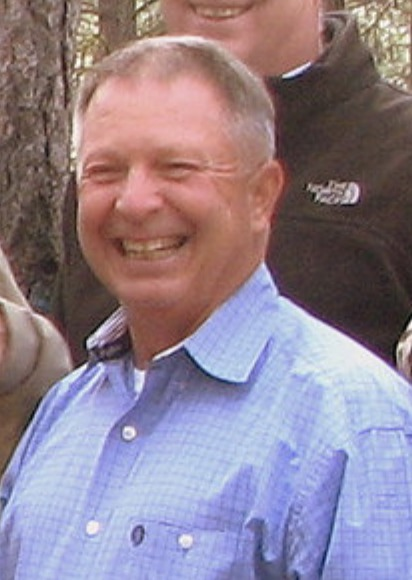

Josephine County Commissioner
- Incumbent
- Assumed office May 2022

Chair of the Oregon Republican Party
- Acting
- In office March 11, 2022 – July 5, 2022
- Preceded by: Dallas Heard
- Succeeded by: Justin Hwang

Minority Leader of the Oregon State Senate
- In office January 22, 2019 – January 11, 2021
- Preceded by: Jackie Winters
- Succeeded by: Fred Girod

Member of the Oregon State Senate from the 2nd district
- In office January 14, 2013 – January 11, 2021
- Preceded by: Jason Atkinson
- Succeeded by: Art Robinson

Personal details
- Party: Republican
- Spouse: Leta Baertschiger (died 2017)

Herman Baertschiger Jr. is an American Republican politician from Oregon who is the chair and a member of the Josephine County Board of Commissioners. He previously served in the Oregon State Senate from 2013 to 2021, representing the 2nd district. He was elected in 2012 and served as minority leader of the Oregon state senate from 2019 to 2021. Baertschiger served on the Senate Committee on Education and the Senate Committee on Finance and Revenue. During the 2013–2015 legislative biennium session, Baertschiger vice-chaired the Senate Committee on Rural Communities and Economic Development and served on the Senate Committee on General Government, Consumer and Small Business Protection.

== Business career and personal life ==
Baertschiger is the head of the forestry-based HB Company, Inc., and runs a small ranch near Grants Pass. He has three sons and was married to Leta, who died in 2017.

== Political career ==
Originally, Baertschiger faced a possible primary challenges from state senator Jason Atkinson and state representative Wally Hicks, but both men withdrew before filing. James Diefenderfer, a Democratic Party candidate, filed a last-minute challenge, but was defeated by an almost two-to-one margin.

In May and June 2019, state Senate Republicans staged two walkouts, denying quorum in an effort to stop a gross receipts business tax bill and a gas and energy tax bill, aimed to lower greenhouse gas emissions. The Senate holds 30 seats, but 1 is vacant due to a death. Without the Republican senators, the remaining 18 Democratic state senators could not reach a quorum of 20 to hold a vote.

In 2020 he declined to run for reelection.

Baertschiger was elected Josephine County Commissioner in May 2020.

== Electoral history ==
2012 Oregon State Senator, 2nd district
Party	Candidate	Votes	%
Republican	Herman Baertschiger Jr	34,420	65.2
Democratic	Jim Diefenderfer	18,219	34.5
Write-in		174	0.3
Total votes		52,813	100%

2016 Oregon State Senator, 2nd district
Party	Candidate	Votes	%
Republican	Herman Baertschiger Jr	43,535	97.6
Write-in		1,075	2.4
Total votes		44,610	100%

Oregon Senate
Preceded by Jackie Winters	Minority Leader of the Oregon Senate; 2019–2021	Succeeded by Fred Girod
Party political offices
Preceded by Dallas Heard	Chair of the Oregon Republican Party; Acting; 2022	Succeeded by Justin Hwang
