= Dennis Linthicum =

American politician

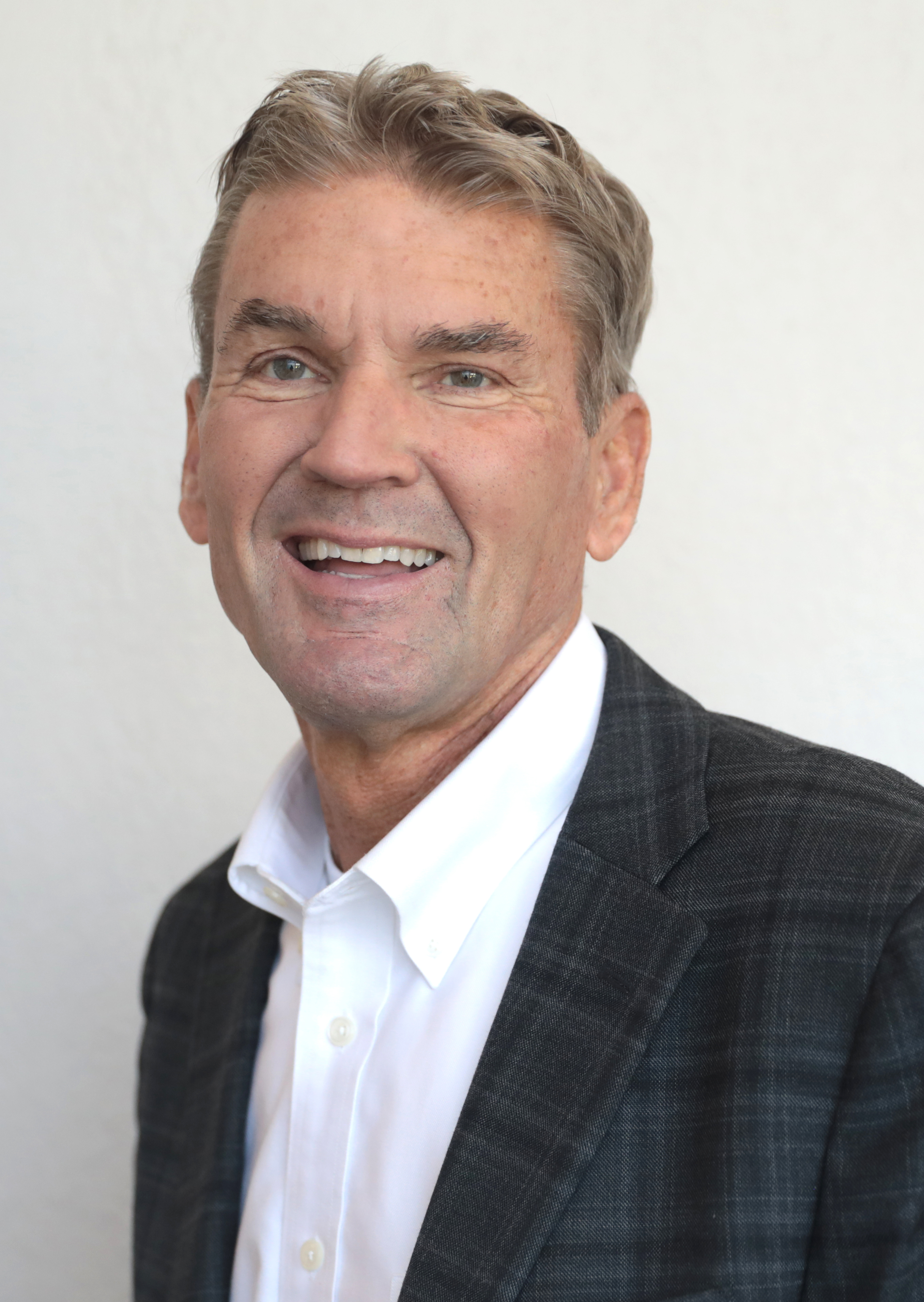
- Linthicum in 2022

Member of the Oregon Senate from the 28th district
- In office January 9, 2017 – January 13, 2025
- Preceded by: Doug Whitsett
- Succeeded by: Diane Linthicum

Member of the Klamath County Board of Commissioners
- In office January 2009 – January 2015
- Succeeded by: Kelley Minty Morris

Personal details
- Born: 1956 (age 69–70) California, U.S.
- Party: Republican
- Spouse: Diane Linthicum
- Education: University of California, Los Angeles (BA); Biola University (MA)

Dennis Linthicum (born 1956) is an American politician who served in the Oregon Senate from 2017 until 2025. He is a member of the Republican Party.

== Early life and career ==
Linthicum graduated with a bachelors in economics from University of California, Los Angeles in 1978, and received his master's degree in Christian Apologetics from Biola University in 2009. He began a software developer career in California, working at Hughes Aircraft. Later, he was the senior vice president of management information systems at Lange Financial and again at Pacific Mutual Life Insurance.

== Political career ==
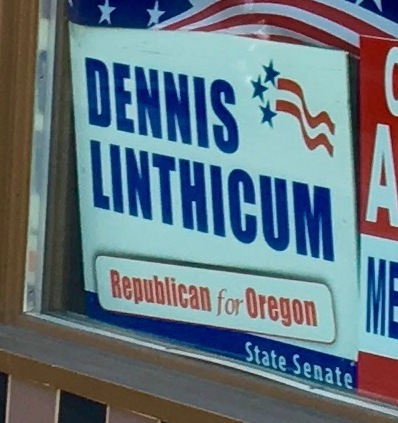
Dennis Linthicum campaign sign at the Jackson County Republican Party headquarters, August 2016

Linthicum was elected as a Klamath County Commissioner in 2008. In 2013, he was involved in a recall petition to remove all of the commissioners over funding. Recall backers did not gather enough signatures on petitions to qualify the issue for the ballot.

In 2014, Linthicum ran as a conservative insurgent for the 2nd U.S. Congressional District seat held by U.S. Rep. Greg Walden, R-Hood River. Walden won over 74% of the May primary vote over Linthicum. Walden won re-election in November with over 70% of the vote over two opponents.

Linthicum won election to the Oregon Senate in 2016. He and Oregon House candidate E. Werner Reschke, were the center of efforts to change candidate filing deadlines - nicknamed the "Whitsett Maneuver". None won approval of the Legislature.

During the 2019 legislative session, Linthicum was among 11 Republican state senators who walked-out. The move was to deny the Democratic-majority Senate the minimum of 20 senators required to establish a quorum to do any business. Oregon is one of five states in the nation requiring a two-thirds quorum. The walkout's aim was to prevent a vote on a cap-and-trade bill that supporters said would lower greenhouse gas emissions by 2050 to combat climate change. With the state budget unfinished, Democrats withdrew the carbon cap bill. Republicans returned on June 29 for a weekend marathon of votes, narrowly avoiding the constitutional deadline to complete the 160-day session. Linthicum remained absent, saying he had a prior commitment.

Linthicum was elected to a second four-year term in November 2020.

On December 11, 2020, Linthicum and 11 other state Republican officials signed a letter requesting Oregon Attorney General Ellen Rosenblum join Texas and other states contesting the results of the 2020 presidential election in Texas v. Pennsylvania. Rosenblum announced she had filed in behalf of the defense, and against Texas, the day prior.

Linthicum was elected treasurer of the Oregon Republican Party in February 2021 as part of a conservative insurgent slate that also elected Sen. Dallas Heard, R-Roseburg, as chairman and former Sen. Herman Baertschiger, Jr., R-Grants Pass, as vice chair.

In October 2021, Linthicum signed a letter along with other Republican politicians from around the nation calling for an audit of the 2020 election in all states and the elimination of voter rolls in every state. The letter also claimed that the Arizona audit found evidence of fraud.

Linthicum sponsored the Greater Idaho bill in the Oregon Senate on January 10, 2023, which would have required Oregon officials discuss the border between Idaho and Oregon from the Snake River to roughly follow the Cascade Range (with a conspicuous loop to ensure the booming and increasingly Democratic-tilting resort town of Bend) that would make 15 counties currently in Eastern Oregon part of Idaho. The bill died without coming to a vote by the end of the session.

=== 2023 unexcused absences ===
While participating in a Republican-led walkout in May 2023, Linthicum reached the 10 unexcused absence threshold set by measure 113, disqualifying him from running for reelection after his term ended. Linthicum and four other Senators filed a lawsuit against Oregon Secretary of State LaVonne Griffin-Valade in response, arguing that the measure's wording allowed them to serve one additional term before being barred from reelection. In September Linthicum filed for reelection despite the disqualification. The Oregon Supreme Court agreed to hear the case with arguments beginning December 14 and unanimously ruled against the Republican Senators, confirming Linthicum's disqualification after the end of his term in January 2025.

Linthicum was replaced by his wife, Diane, after the 2024 election.

=== 2024 Oregon Secretary of State campaign ===
On March 12, 2024, Linthicum announced his candidacy for Secretary of State in the 2024 elections. Although securing the Republican nomination, he failed to be elected, losing with 41.9% to 54.4% to Democrat Tobias Read.

== Personal life ==
Linthicum and his wife, Diane, have two children. He attends Bonanza Community Church.

== Electoral history ==
2016 Oregon State Senator, 28th district
Party	Candidate	Votes	%
Republican	Dennis Linthicum	37,119	61.3
Democratic	Todd Kepple	23,153	38.2
Write-in		283	0.5
Total votes		60,555	100%

2020 Oregon State Senator, 28th district
Party	Candidate	Votes	%
Republican	Dennis Linthicum	54,800	72.7
Democratic	Hugh Palcic	20,444	27.1
Write-in		102	0.1
Total votes		75,346	100%

2024 Oregon Secretary of State election
Party	Candidate	Votes	%
Democratic	Tobias Read	1,166,447	54.4
Republican	Dennis Linthicum	897,704	41.9
Pacific Green	Nathalie Paravicini	76,170	3.6
Write-in		2,011	0.1
Total votes		2,142,332	100%
