= Court Boice =

American politician

Member of the Oregon House of Representatives from the 1st district
- Incumbent
- Assumed office February 9, 2023
- Preceded by: David Brock Smith

Personal details
- Party: Republican

Court Boice is an American Republican politician who has served as a member of the Oregon House of Representatives from the 1st district, representing Curry County and parts of Coos and Douglas counties. He took office on February 9, 2023. The seat had been vacant since January 11, when previous representative David Brock Smith resigned to be seated in Oregon State Senate following the resignation of Dallas Heard. Prior to his appointment to the state legislature, Boice was a Curry County commissioner. Following the Standoff at Eagle Pass, Boice signed a letter in support of Texas Governor Greg Abbott's decision in the conflict. He ran for a full term in the 2024 Oregon House election and defeated Democratic nominee Bret Cecil.

== Electoral history ==
2024 Oregon State Representative, 1st district
Party	Candidate	Votes	%
Republican	Court Boice	26,950	67.2
Democratic	Bret Cecil	13,036	32.5
Write-in		94	0.2
Total votes		40,080	100%

Oregon House of Representatives
Preceded by David Brock Smith	Member of the Oregon House of Representatives from the 1st district 2023–	Incumbent
