= Lily Morgan =

American politician

Member of the Oregon House of Representatives from the 3rd district
- In office January 11, 2021 – December 3, 2023
- Preceded by: Carl Wilson
- Succeeded by: Dwayne Yunker

Personal details
- Party: Republican

Lily Morgan is an American politician who served as a Republican member of the Oregon House of Representatives from 2021 to 2023.

== Political career ==
In October 2021, Morgan signed a letter along with other Republican politicians from around the nation calling for an audit of the 2020 election in all states and the elimination of voter rolls in every state. The letter also claimed that the Arizona audit found evidence of fraud.

Morgan resigned from the Oregon House in December 2023 after accepting a position as city manager of Gold Hill.

== Electoral history ==
2020 Oregon State Representative, 3rd district
Party	Candidate	Votes	%
Republican	Lily Morgan	24,609	66.7
Democratic	Jerry Morgan	12,081	32.8
Write-in		178	0.5
Total votes		36,868	100%

2022 Oregon State Representative, 3rd district
Party	Candidate	Votes	%
Republican	Lily Morgan	22,206	68.2
Democratic	Brady W Keister	10,311	31.6
Write-in		63	0.2
Total votes		32,580	100%

Oregon House of Representatives
Preceded by Carl Wilson	Member of the Oregon House of Representatives from the 3rd district 2021–2023	Succeeded by Dwayne Yunker
