= 2020 Oregon legislative election =

2020 Oregon legislative election may refer to:

- The 2020 Oregon State Senate election, held to elect 16 out of 30 seats in the Oregon State Senate
- The 2020 Oregon House of Representatives election, held to elect all 60 members of the Oregon House of Representatives
