= Diane Linthicum =

American politician

Member of the Oregon Senate from the 28th district
- Incumbent
- Assumed office January 13, 2025
- Preceded by: Dennis Linthicum

Personal details
- Party: Republican

Diane Linthicum is an American politician, currently serving in the Oregon State Senate. A member of the Republican Party, she represents the 28th district, which encompasses all of Klamath County as well as outlying parts of Deschutes and Jackson Counties.

== Education ==
Linthicum studied business at Orange Coast College and Rio Hondo College, both community colleges located in California.

== Career ==
Before her election, Linthicum served as chief of staff, constituent program director, and policy analyst for her husband while he served in the Oregon State Senate.

=== Oregon State Senate ===
Linthicum ran for the seat held by her husband, Dennis Linthicum, who served from 2017 to 2025. The Oregon Secretary of State disqualified him from running for reelection under Measure 113 after he accrued 10 or more unexcused absences during the 2023 Oregon Senate walkout.

In the primary, Linthicum defeated Klamath County Commissioner David Henslee with 59.1% of the vote. In the general election, she defeated Democrat Dylan Gutridge with 69.3% of the vote.

In the 2025 session, Linthicum was appointed vice-chair of the Human Services Committee. She was also appointed to the Health Care Committee and the Committee on Early Childhood and Behavioral Health.

== Personal life ==
Linthicum and her husband, Dennis, have two children. They live in Beatty and also own a ranch.

== Electoral history ==
2024 Oregon State Senator, 28th district
Party	Candidate	Votes	%
Republican	Diane Linthicum	50,907	69.3
Democratic	Dylan Gutridge	22,430	30.5
Write-in		100	0.1
Total votes		73,437	100%

2024 Oregon State Senator, 28th district Republican primary
Party	Candidate	Votes	%
Write-in		33	0.2
Republican	David A Henslee	8,252	40.7
Republican	Diane E Linthicum	11,968	59.1
Total votes		20,253	100.00
