= Carl Wilson (Oregon politician) =

American politician

Minority Leader of Oregon House of Representatives
- In office January 2, 2019 – September 16, 2019
- Preceded by: Mike McLane
- Succeeded by: Christine Drazan

Member of the Oregon House of Representatives from the 3rd district
- In office January 2015 – January 2021
- Preceded by: Wally Hicks
- Succeeded by: Lily Morgan

Member of the Oregon House of Representatives from the 49th district
- In office January 1999 – January 2003
- Preceded by: Bob Repine
- Succeeded by: Karen Minnis

Personal details
- Born: July 7, 1952 (age 74) McAlester, Oklahoma, U.S.
- Party: Republican
- Spouse: Malinda
- Children: 2
- Education: Rogue Community College

Military service
- Allegiance: United States
- Branch/service: United States Navy

Carl Wilson (b. July 7, 1952) is an American politician from Oregon. He was the minority leader and House Republican Leader in the Oregon House of Representatives from January to September 2019. He represented District 3 in the Oregon House from 1998 to 2003, and again from 2015 to 2021. He served as Leader of the House Republican Caucus in the 78th Legislative Assembly.

== Personal life ==
Wilson is a resident of Grants Pass. He joined the United States Navy after graduating from high school in 1971 and served as a radioman until 1973. He is married with two adult children.

== Electoral history ==
2014 Oregon State Representative, 3rd district
| Party | Candidate | Votes | % |
|---|---|---|---|
| Republican | Carl Wilson | 15,765 | 64.1 |
| Democratic | Tom Johnson | 6,476 | 26.3 |
| Libertarian | Mark J Seligman | 1,597 | 6.5 |
| Constitution | Barbara L Gonzalez | 657 | 2.7 |
| Write-in | | 85 | 0.3 |
| Total votes | | 24,580 | 100% |

2016 Oregon State Representative, 3rd district
| Party | Candidate | Votes | % |
|---|---|---|---|
| Republican | Carl Wilson | 22,348 | 72.4 |
| Democratic | Tom Johnson | 8,423 | 27.3 |
| Write-in | | 99 | 0.3 |
| Total votes | | 30,870 | 100% |

2018 Oregon State Representative, 3rd district
| Party | Candidate | Votes | % |
|---|---|---|---|
| Republican | Carl Wilson | 20,568 | 69.2 |
| Democratic | Jerry Morgan | 9,100 | 30.6 |
| Write-in | | 76 | 0.3 |
| Total votes | | 29,744 | 100% |

Oregon House of Representatives
| Preceded by Mike McLane | Minority Leader of the Oregon House of Representatives; 2019 | Succeeded by Christine Drazan |
