= Jerry Cummings =

American pastor and politician

Chair of the Oregon Republican Party
- In office February 22, 2025 – April 9, 2025
- Preceded by: Justin Hwang
- Succeeded by: Connie Whelchel

Personal details
- Born: Gerald Earl Cummings II; March 1974 (age 52) Olympia, Washington, U.S.
- Party: Republican
- Education: School of Biblical and Theological Studies (attended)

Gerald Earl Cummings II is an American pastor and politician who served as Chair of the Oregon Republican Party from February to April 2025. He previously served as a member of the Southside School Board in Shelton, Washington and is currently a pastor at Haven Missionary Baptist Church in St. Helens.

== Early life and education ==
Gerald Earl Cummings II was born in March 1974 in Olympia, Washington. He attended Tumwater High School and Hoxie High School, moving to Arkansas while in school. He attended Missionary Baptist Seminary Institute where he studied theology, sacred history, and sacred literature.

== Career ==
Cummings is a pastor a Haven Missionary Baptist Church in St. Helens. Since 2021, he has worked in the insurance industry running his own agency. He has previously worked as a radio station manager and in internet sales.

=== Political career ===
From 2015 to 2016, Cummings served on the Southside School Board in Shelton, Washington.

Cummings previously served on the Columbia County Republican Party Executive Committee. In March 2024, Cummings ran for Republican National Committeeman representing Oregon.

On February 22, 2025, Cummings defeated four other candidates to become Chair of the Oregon Republican Party. He replaced businessman Justin Hwang who declined to seek re-election. Many credit his win to the fact that he got along well with everyone and stood out to multiple different interest groups. He ran on a platform of community engagement and grassroots initiatives, and planned to reach out to party youth. Cummings served as chair for about two months before resigning on April 9, 2025. He was replaced by vice-chair Connie Whelchel.

== Personal life ==
Cummings is a Missionary Baptist and serves as a pastor at Haven Missionary Baptist Church in St. Helens. He resides in Warren, Oregon.

=== Controversy ===
In April 2025, investigative journalist Nigel Jaquiss released a story about Cummings' former marriage. Cummings had married a woman who he had met when he was 26 and she was 16. The woman claimed that while underage, Cummings had taken her to hotels when her parents were out of town, and that since the beginning of their marriage, he was abusive. She claimed that during sex, he would admit his sexual fantasies with young girls and "promised not to act on those fantasies so long as [she] allowed him to do whatever he wanted in their sexual relationship."

After the divorce filing, Cummings allegedly handcuffed her and hit her. He later lost custody of their children, and did not abide by the court's request for him to undergo psychosexual evaluations. Cummings has declined the accusations. Jaquiss' article also revealed that Cummings was accused of depositing around $17,000 in bad checks at OnPoint Community Credit Union and withdrawing cash against them, and that he had borrowed $93,000 from Washington Trust Bank and had failed to make any payments.

Party political offices
Preceded by Justin Hwang	Chair of the Oregon Republican Party; 2025	Succeeded by Connie Whelchel
