= Oregon's 2nd Senate district =

American legislative district

Oregon's 2nd Senate District as of September 27, 2021

District 2 of the Oregon State Senate comprises all of Josephine County as well as southern Douglas County and northwestern Jackson County. It is composed of Oregon House districts 3 and 4. It is currently represented by Republican Noah Robinson of Cave Junction.

== Election results ==
District boundaries have changed over time. Therefore, senators before 2013 may not represent the same constituency as today. From 1993 until 2003, the district covered part of the central Oregon Coast and Yamhill County; from 2003 through 2013, the district shifted to cover most of Josephine and western Jackson counties; and from 2013 through 2023, it shrunk to only cover the areas surrounding Cave Junction, Central Point, Grants Pass, and White City.

The current district is similar to its previous iterations, losing White City but regaining all of Josephine County and adding most of northwestern Jackson County as well as southern Douglas County around Canyonville and Riddle.

The results are as follows:

Year	Candidate	Party	Percent	Opponent	Party	Percent	Opponent	Party	Percent
1984	John Brenneman	Republican	51.2%	Dell Isham	Democratic	48.8%	No third candidate		
1988	John Brenneman	Republican	50.9%	Susan Ray	Democratic	49.1%	No third candidate		
1992	Stan Bunn	Republican	57.3%	Karin L. Barnett	Democratic	42.7%	No third candidate		
1996	Gary George	Republican	48.4%	Dell Isham	Democratic	47.2%	Tom Torrence	Reform	4.4%
2000	Gary George	Republican	50.4%	Terry Thompson	Democratic	49.6%	No third candidate		
2004	Jason Atkinson	Republican	96.2%	Unopposed					
2008	Jason Atkinson	Republican	68.8%	Richard Koopmans	Democratic	30.8%	No third candidate		
2012	Herman Baertschiger	Republican	65.2%	Jim Diefenderfer	Democratic	34.5%	No third candidate		
2016	Herman Baertschiger	Republican	97.6%	Unopposed					
2020	Art Robinson	Republican	63.9%	Jerry Allen	Democratic	33.6%	Thomas Griffin	Libertarian	2.4%
2024	Noah Robinson	Republican	66.9%	Tracy Thompson	Democratic	32.9%	No third candidate		
