= David Brock Smith =

American politician

David Smith
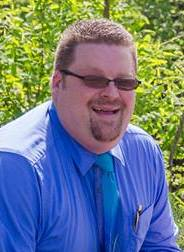
- Smith in 2017

Member of the Oregon State Senate from the 1st district
- Incumbent
- Assumed office January 11, 2023
- Preceded by: Dallas Heard

Member of the Oregon House of Representatives from the 1st district
- In office January 9, 2017 – January 11, 2023
- Preceded by: Wayne Krieger
- Succeeded by: Court Boice

Personal details
- Born: David Brock Smith; 1976 or 1977 (age 49–50)
- Party: Republican
- Education: Southwestern Oregon Community College (AA); Southern Oregon University (BA)
- Website: State senate website Campaign website

David Brock Smith (born 1976/1977) is an American politician who has served in the Oregon State Senate since 2023, representing the 1st district, which covers all of Curry County and parts of Coos and Douglas counties. A member of the Republican Party, he was appointed to the Senate in 2023 to fill a vacancy. He previously served in the Oregon House of Representatives from 2017 to 2023 and as a Curry County commissioner. He won the Republican nomination for the U.S. Senate election in May 2026 and lost the general election to incumbent Democrat Jeff Merkley.

== Career ==
Smith grew up in Port Orford. He graduated from Pacific High School in 1995 and took courses at Southwestern Oregon Community College and Southern Oregon University. He worked in the restaurant industry in the Rogue Valley before returning to Port Orford to take over his family's restaurant.

Smith served on the Port Orford City Council from 2005 to 2012, including as council president, and was president of the area chamber of commerce and a member of the Port Orford-Langlois School Board. He was a Curry County commissioner from 2013 to 2017. In 2013, an effort to recall Smith and fellow commissioner David Itzen was started, but failed. As commissioner, he worked with U.S. Senator Jeff Merkley on efforts to combat the spread of sudden oak death in southwestern Oregon. He was also a member of the Curry County Planning Commission.

Smith filed to run for the House in 2016. He won the general election with 60% of the vote, defeating Democrat Terry Brayer and Libertarian Tamie Kaufman.

On December 11, 2020, Smith was one of twelve Republican state officials who signed a letter asking Oregon Attorney General Ellen Rosenblum to join Texas v. Pennsylvania, a lawsuit challenging the results of the 2020 presidential election. Rosenblum had announced the previous day that Oregon was filing in support of Pennsylvania. After the January 6, 2021 attack on the U.S. Capitol, Representative Julie Fahey said those who had signed the letter were "complicit in today's violence." Smith responded that the attack was not a coup or an act of sedition, and said the letter was meant to draw attention to what he described as unconstitutional actions in Pennsylvania's election.

In 2021, Smith sponsored House Bill 3375, which established a goal of planning for the development of offshore wind energy projects.

Smith was appointed to the Oregon State Senate on January 11, 2023 to fill the vacancy left when Dallas Heard resigned. He was replaced in the House by Court Boice.

On May 3, 2023, all but two of the members of the Senate Republican caucus walked out of session, preventing a quorum. Under Measure 113, legislators with 10 unexcused absences are disqualified from serving the next term. By June 19, the only Senate Republicans who had not crossed the 10-absence threshold were Smith, Anderson, and Fred Girod.

Smith is a deputy leader of the Senate Republican caucus. In 2023, he was a chief sponsor, with Senators Bill Hansell and Lynn Findley, of Senate Bill 498, which created an estate tax exemption of up to $15 million for qualifying natural resource properties used in farming, forestry, or fishing business. In 2025, the Senate unanimously passed his Senate Bill 485, which provides tax relief for small forestland owners.

Smith announced on March 3, 2026, that he would seek the Republican nomination for U.S. Senate. On May 22, 2026, Smith won the nomination. He was defeated by incumbent Democratic senator Jeff Merkley in the general election on November 3, 2026.

== Electoral history ==
2016 Oregon State Representative, 1st district
Party	Candidate	Votes	%
Republican	David Brock Smith	20,274	59.7
Democratic	Terry Brayer	10,129	29.8
Libertarian	Tamie Kaufman	3,507	10.3
Write-in		45	0.1
Total votes		33,955	100%

2018 Oregon State Representative, 1st district
Party	Candidate	Votes	%
Republican	David Brock Smith	22,077	68.5
Democratic	Eldon Rollins	10,071	31.2
Write-in		100	0.3
Total votes		32,248	100%

2020 Oregon State Representative, 1st district
Party	Candidate	Votes	%
Republican	David Brock Smith	28,125	68.9
Democratic	Calla Felicity	12,659	31.0
Write-in		65	0.2
Total votes		40,849	100%

2022 Oregon State Representative, 1st district
Party	Candidate	Votes	%
Republican	David Brock Smith	25,451	70.5
Democratic	Bret Cecil	10,536	29.2
Write-in		96	0.3
Total votes		36,083	100%

2024 Oregon State Senator, 1st district
Party	Candidate	Votes	%
Republican	David Brock Smith	54,925	70.8
Democratic	Lupe Preciado-McAlister	22,417	28.9
Write-in		254	0.3
Total votes		77,596	100%

Party political offices
Preceded by Jo Rae Perkins	Republican nominee for U.S. Senator from Oregon (Class 2); 2026	Most recent
