= 1900 United States presidential election in Oregon =

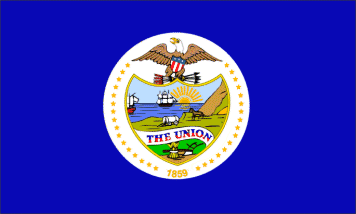
- November 6, 1900
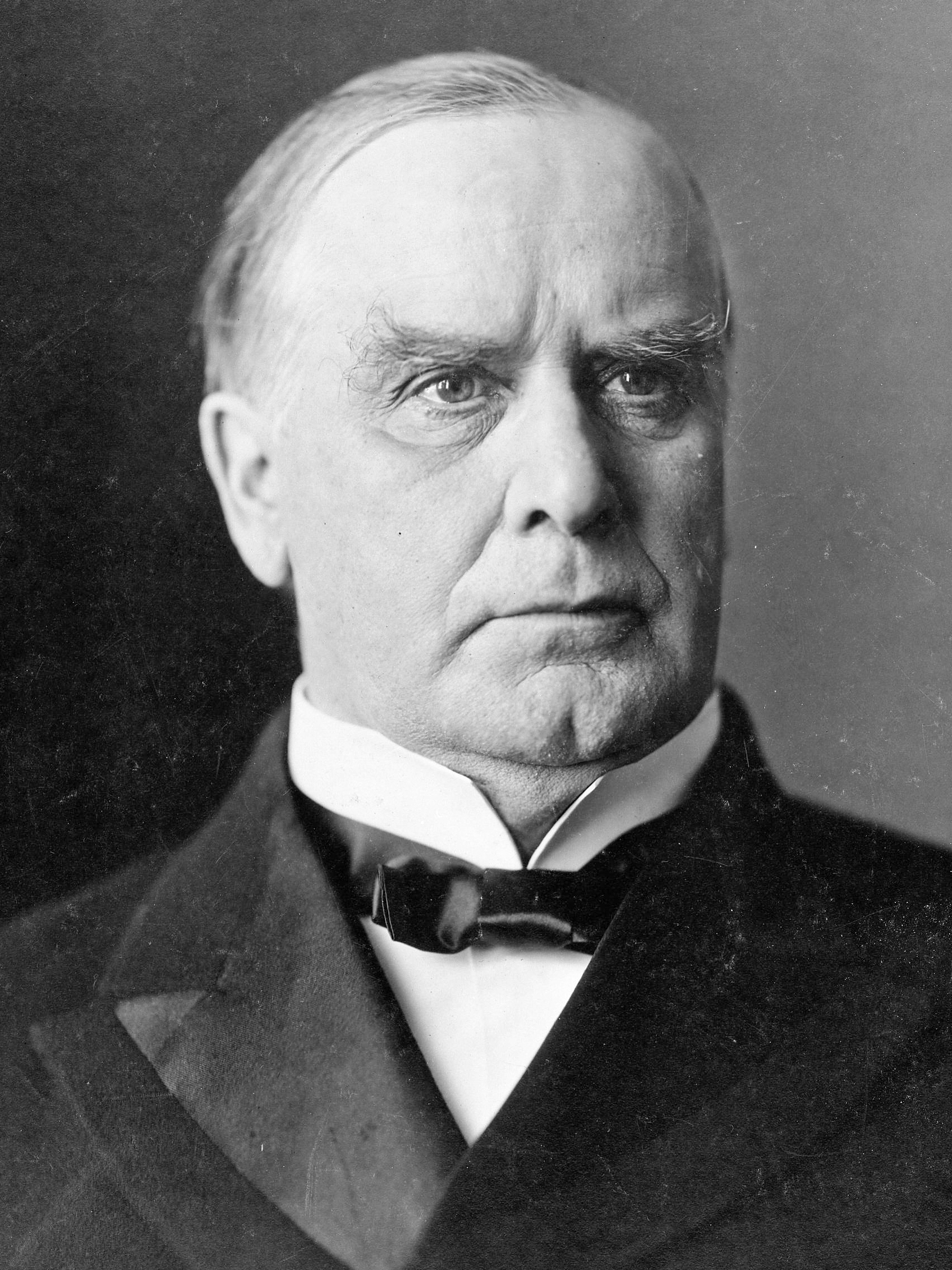

Nominee	William McKinley	William Jennings Bryan
Party	Republican	Democratic
Home state	Ohio	Nebraska
Running mate	Theodore Roosevelt	Adlai Stevenson I
Electoral vote	4	0
Popular vote	46,526	33,385
Percentage	55.25%	39.64%
County results
McKinley
40–50%
50–60%
60–70%
Bryan
40–50%
50–60%
President before election
William McKinley
Republican
Elected President
William McKinley
Republican

The 1900 United States presidential election in Oregon took place on November 6, 1900. All contemporary 45 states were part of the 1900 United States presidential election. Oregon voters chose four electors to the Electoral College, which selected the president and vice president.

A return to prosperity, continued American expansion in the Philippines, and the fading of the Populist revolt that had spread into Southern Oregon during the previous decade ensured that incumbent President William McKinley would not have any trouble carrying the state.

Indeed, the Populist voters during the 1890s from southern and Eastern Oregon – who had been historically Democratic since before statehood when they were substantially settled by Upland Southerners from the Ozarks and Appalachia (in contrast to the already Republican, Yankee-settled Willamette Valley) – turned in substantial numbers to McKinley, so that Jackson County and also Umatilla County voted for a Republican presidential candidate for the first time ever and Josephine County for only the second after 1888. These results were also replicated in lower-level elections, so that at state level Oregon would remain, with a very brief New Deal interlude, a one-party state dominated by the Republican Party until the “Revolution of 1954”. Consequently, this would prove the last time until Franklin D. Roosevelt’s 1932 landslide that any Democrat other than Woodrow Wilson carried any of Oregon's counties in a presidential election.

Bryan had previously lost Oregon to McKinley four years earlier and would later lose the state again a third time in 1908 to William Howard Taft.

== Results ==
1900 United States presidential election in Oregon
Party	Candidate	Votes	Percentage	Electoral votes
Republican	William McKinley (incumbent)	46,526	55.25%	4
Democratic	William Jennings Bryan	33,385	39.64%	0
Prohibition	John G. Woolley	2,536	3.01%	0
Social Democratic	Eugene V. Debs	1,494	1.77%	0
Populist	Wharton Barker	275	0.33%	0
Totals		84,216	100.00%	4
Voter turnout				—

=== Results by county ===
County	William McKinley Republican		William Jennings Bryan Democratic		John G. Woolley Prohibition		Eugene V. Debs Social Democratic		Wharton Barker Populist		Margin		Total votes cast
County	#	%	#	%	#	%	#	%	#	%	#	%	Total votes cast
Baker	1,458	46.14%	1,615	51.11%	40	1.27%	41	1.30%	6	0.19%	-157	-4.97%	3,160
Benton	931	52.13%	764	42.78%	81	4.54%	7	0.39%	3	0.17%	167	9.35%	1,786
Clackamas	2,234	53.86%	1,641	39.56%	118	2.84%	132	3.18%	23	0.55%	593	14.30%	4,148
Clatsop	1,329	62.48%	688	32.35%	38	1.79%	66	3.10%	6	0.28%	641	30.14%	2,127
Columbia	863	64.79%	403	30.26%	31	2.33%	30	2.25%	5	0.38%	460	34.53%	1,332
Coos	1,153	53.90%	888	41.51%	53	2.48%	31	1.45%	14	0.65%	265	12.39%	2,139
Crook	474	52.96%	381	42.57%	16	1.79%	21	2.35%	3	0.34%	93	10.39%	895
Curry	308	66.09%	152	32.62%	3	0.64%	2	0.43%	1	0.21%	156	33.48%	466
Douglas	1,910	51.92%	1,624	44.14%	75	2.04%	53	1.44%	17	0.46%	286	7.77%	3,679
Gilliam	419	52.97%	343	43.36%	22	2.78%	5	0.63%	2	0.25%	76	9.61%	791
Grant	911	58.03%	613	39.04%	15	0.96%	26	1.66%	5	0.32%	298	18.98%	1,570
Harney	372	47.27%	387	49.17%	2	0.25%	23	2.92%	3	0.38%	-15	-1.91%	787
Jackson	1,565	48.17%	1,525	46.94%	68	2.09%	71	2.19%	20	0.62%	40	1.23%	3,249
Josephine	919	52.51%	744	42.51%	45	2.57%	37	2.11%	5	0.29%	175	10.00%	1,750
Klamath	428	55.44%	324	41.97%	8	1.04%	4	0.52%	8	1.04%	104	13.47%	772
Lake	456	65.71%	233	33.57%	1	0.14%	2	0.29%	2	0.29%	223	32.13%	694
Lane	2,521	53.12%	2,037	42.92%	133	2.80%	48	1.01%	7	0.15%	484	10.20%	4,746
Lincoln	472	59.97%	266	33.80%	8	1.02%	36	4.57%	5	0.64%	206	26.18%	787
Linn	1,927	45.13%	1,997	46.77%	228	5.34%	92	2.18%	25	0.59%	-70	-1.64%	4,270
Malheur	478	48.04%	486	48.84%	18	1.81%	7	0.70%	6	0.60%	-8	-0.80%	995
Marion	3,112	54.36%	2,318	40.49%	187	3.27%	89	1.55%	19	0.33%	794	13.87%	5,725
Morrow	723	62.65%	358	31.02%	41	3.55%	28	2.43%	4	0.35%	365	31.63%	1,154
Multnomah	9,948	65.46%	4,436	29.19%	455	2.99%	347	2.28%	12	0.08%	5,512	36.27%	15,198
Polk	1,163	50.61%	991	43.12%	102	4.44%	19	0.83%	23	1.00%	172	7.48%	2,298
Sherman	451	48.65%	385	41.53%	82	8.85%	8	0.86%	1	0.11%	66	7.12%	927
Tillamook	623	60.19%	313	30.24%	73	7.05%	24	2.32%	2	0.19%	310	29.95%	1,035
Umatilla	1,975	52.06%	1,638	43.17%	130	3.43%	43	1.13%	8	0.21%	337	8.88%	3,794
Union	1,512	45.93%	1,646	50.00%	57	1.73%	67	2.04%	10	0.30%	-134	-4.07%	3,292
Wallowa	651	52.33%	559	44.94%	21	1.69%	7	0.56%	6	0.48%	92	7.40%	1,244
Wasco	1,576	57.37%	1,038	37.79%	85	3.09%	36	1.31%	12	0.44%	538	19.59%	2,747
Washington	1,655	56.14%	1,114	37.79%	126	4.27%	49	1.66%	4	0.14%	541	18.35%	2,948
Wheeler	426	62.01%	243	35.37%	10	1.46%	4	0.58%	4	0.58%	183	26.64%	687
Yamhill	1,583	52.35%	1,235	40.84%	164	5.42%	38	1.26%	4	0.13%	348	11.51%	3,024
Totals	46,526	55.25%	33,385	39.64%	2,536	3.01%	1,494	1.77%	275	0.33%	13,141	15.60%	84,216

== See also ==
- United States presidential elections in Oregon
