= Dwayne Yunker =

American politician

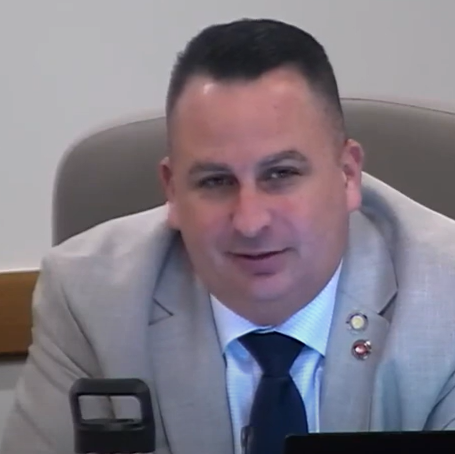
- Yunker in 2024

Member of the Oregon House of Representatives from the 3rd district
- Incumbent
- Assumed office December 27, 2023
- Preceded by: Lily Morgan

Personal details
- Party: Republican
- Dwayne Yunker's voice Yunker speaking in a session of the House Committee on Behavioral Health and Health Care; Recorded February 22, 2024

Dwayne Yunker is an American Republican politician currently serving the 3rd district in the Oregon House of Representatives.

Yunker is a veteran, a real estate agent and former member of the Grants Pass City Council.

== Electoral history ==
2024 Oregon State Representative, 3rd district
Party	Candidate	Votes	%
Republican	Dwayne Yunker	23,618	66.6
Democratic	Mark J Seligman	10,992	31.0
Write-in		873	2.5
Total votes		35,483	100%
