= Oregon's 1st House district =

Legislative districts in the state of Oregon

Oregon's 1st House district after redistricting after the 2020 Census

District 1 of the Oregon House of Representatives is one of 60 House legislative districts in the state of Oregon. As of 2021, the boundary for the district includes all of Curry County and portions of Coos and Douglas counties. The current representative for the district is Republican Court Boice of Gold Beach.

== Election results ==
District boundaries have changed over time. Therefore, representatives before 2021 may not represent the same constituency as today. General election results from 2000 to present are as follows:

Year	Candidate	Party	Percent	Opponent	Party	Percent	Opponent	Party	Percent	Write-in Percentage
2000	Betsy Johnson	Democratic	62.13%	Bob Ekstrom	Constitution	31.16%	Don McDaniel	Libertarian	6.72%	
2002 (Note: Wayne Krieger was the incumbent in this election. He previously represented District 48, but was moved to this district due to redistricting following the 2000 United States census.)	Wayne Krieger	Republican	66.45%	Dave Tilton	Democratic	33.10%	No third candidate			0.45%
2004	Wayne Krieger	Republican	64.12%	Charles Hochberg	Democratic	35.88%	No third candidate			
2006	Wayne Krieger	Republican	73.47%	Robert Taylor	Libertarian	25.73%	No third candidate			0.80%
2008	Wayne Krieger	Republican	60.62%	Richard Goche	Democratic	39.14%	No third candidate			0.23%
2010	Wayne Krieger	Republican	72.25%	Eldon Rollins	Democratic	27.39%	No third candidate			0.37%
2012	Wayne Krieger	Republican	68.28%	Jim Klahr	Democratic	31.49%	No third candidate			0.24%
2014	Wayne Krieger	Republican	69.94%	Jim Klahr	Democratic	29.63%	No third candidate			0.43%
2016	David Brock Smith	Republican	59.71%	Terry Brayer	Democratic	29.83%	Tamie Kaufman	Libertarian	10.33%	0.13%
2018	David Brock Smith	Republican	68.46%	Eldon Rollins	Democratic	31.23%	No third candidate			0.31%
2020	David Brock Smith	Republican	68.85%	Felicity Calla	Democratic	30.99%	No third candidate			0.16%
2022	David Brock Smith	Republican	70.53%	Cecil Bret	Democratic	29.20%	No third candidate			0.27%
2024	Court Boice	Republican	67.2%	Bret Cecil	Democratic	32.5%	No third candidate			0.2%

== See also ==
- Oregon Legislative Assembly
- Oregon House of Representatives
