= 1908 United States presidential election in Oregon =

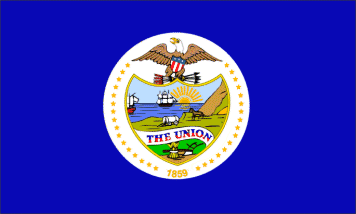
- November 3, 1908

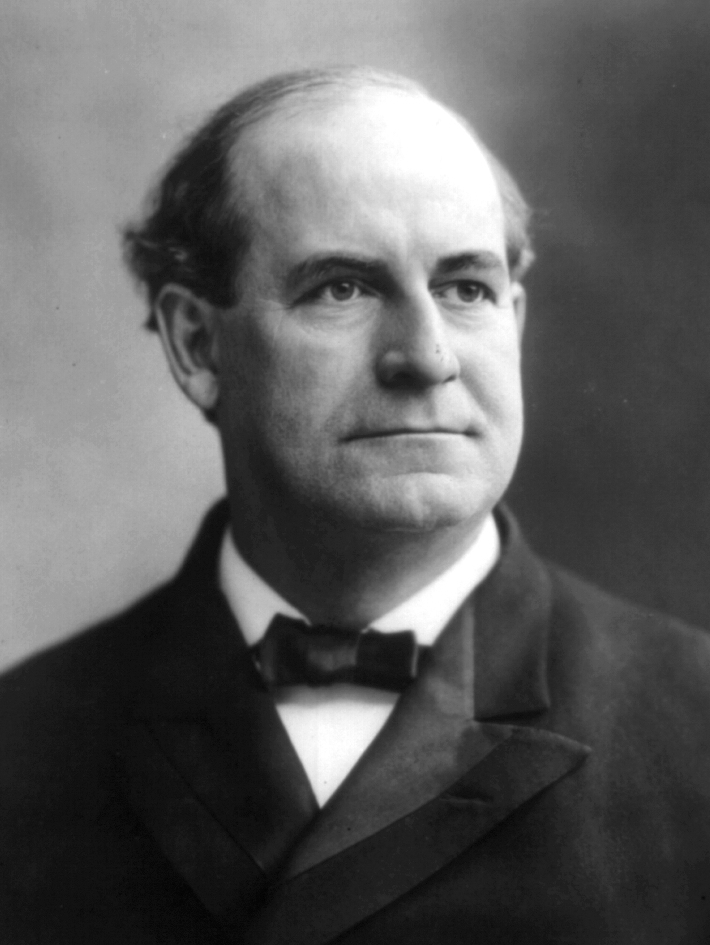

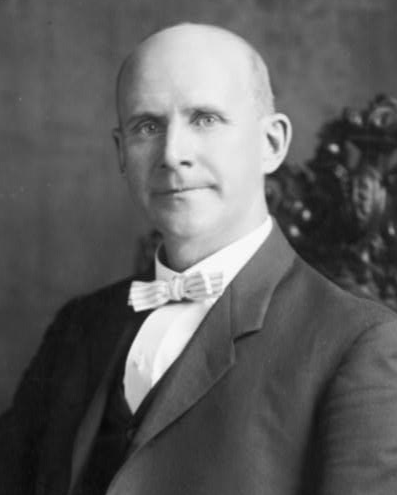
Nominee	William Howard Taft	William Jennings Bryan	Eugene V. Debs
Party	Republican	Democratic	Socialist
Home state	Ohio	Nebraska	Indiana
Running mate	James S. Sherman	John W. Kern	Ben Hanford
Electoral vote	4	0	0
Popular vote	62,530	38,049	7,339
Percentage	56.39%	34.31%	6.62%
County results
Taft
40–50%
50–60%
60–70%
President before election
Theodore Roosevelt
Republican
Elected President
William Howard Taft
Republican

The 1908 United States presidential election in Oregon took place on November 3, 1908. All contemporary 46 states were part of the 1908 United States presidential election. State voters chose four electors to the Electoral College, which selected the president and vice president.

Polls always said that Oregon, which had voted Democratic only once over twelve presidential elections since statehood, (Note: This was in the Reconstruction election of 1868, for Horatio Seymour.) would ultimately be easily retained by Taft. Despite differences with the state GOP, a New York Times opinion poll continued to show a Taft victory as certain, although The Washington Post was much less certain. Ultimately, however, Taft would repeat Roosevelt's feat of sweeping every county in Oregon, but his winning margin was less than half as large as that by which Alton Brooks Parker had been defeated in 1904.

Bryan had previously lost Oregon twice to Republican William McKinley in both 1896 and 1900.

Oregon had been earlier in the 1900s solidified as a one-party Republican bastion, which it would remain at a Presidential level apart from the 1910s GOP split until Franklin D. Roosevelt rose to power in 1932, and apart from a very short New Deal interlude at state level until the “Revolution of 1954”. Democratic representation in the Oregon legislature would never exceed fifteen percent during this period except for the above-mentioned 1930s interlude, and Republican primaries would become the chief mode of competition.

The Beaver State's few Democrats pledged themselves to Bryan – who had been the last Democratic presidential candidate to carry any of the state's counties – in June. In contrast, Senator Jonathan Bourne wanted incumbent President Theodore Roosevelt to run for effectively a third term; however once it was clear that Taft would be the GOP nominee Bourne campaigned for him vigorously in spite of his history as a “silver Republican” who backed Bryan in 1896.

== Results ==
1908 United States presidential election in Oregon
Party	Candidate	Votes	Percentage	Electoral votes
Republican	William Howard Taft	62,530	56.39%	4
Democratic	William Jennings Bryan	38,049	34.31%	0
Socialist	Eugene V. Debs	7,339	6.62%	0
Prohibition	Eugene W. Chafin	2,682	2.42%	0
Independence	Thomas L. Hisgen	289	0.26%	0
Totals		110,889	100.00%	4
Voter turnout				—

=== Results by county ===
County	William Howard Taft Republican		William Jennings Bryan Democratic		Eugene V. Debs Socialist		Eugene W. Chafin Prohibition		Thomas Hisgen Independence		Margin		Total votes cast
County	#	%	#	%	#	%	#	%	#	%	#	%	Total votes cast
Baker	1,689	46.79%	1,596	44.21%	270	7.48%	23	0.64%	32	0.89%	93	2.58%	3,610
Benton	1,183	55.99%	773	36.58%	66	3.12%	87	4.12%	4	0.19%	410	19.40%	2,113
Clackamas	2,776	53.91%	1,866	36.24%	363	7.05%	123	2.39%	21	0.41%	910	17.67%	5,149
Clatsop	1,482	59.78%	658	26.54%	282	11.38%	51	2.06%	6	0.24%	824	33.24%	2,479
Columbia	1,242	63.69%	454	23.28%	201	10.31%	42	2.15%	11	0.56%	788	40.41%	1,950
Coos	1,850	56.94%	894	27.52%	431	13.27%	50	1.54%	24	0.74%	956	29.42%	3,249
Crook	915	56.87%	548	34.06%	106	6.59%	39	2.42%	1	0.06%	367	22.81%	1,609
Curry	268	58.64%	148	32.39%	33	7.22%	0	0.00%	8	1.75%	120	26.26%	457
Douglas	2,092	53.81%	1,359	34.95%	370	9.52%	60	1.54%	7	0.18%	733	18.85%	3,888
Gilliam	470	61.92%	242	31.88%	37	4.87%	6	0.79%	4	0.53%	228	30.04%	759
Grant	748	56.93%	433	32.95%	106	8.07%	13	0.99%	14	1.07%	315	23.97%	1,314
Harney	450	52.39%	329	38.30%	65	7.57%	11	1.28%	4	0.47%	121	14.09%	859
Hood River	767	62.16%	359	29.09%	58	4.70%	47	3.81%	3	0.24%	408	33.06%	1,234
Jackson	2,032	50.09%	1,537	37.89%	379	9.34%	98	2.42%	11	0.27%	495	12.20%	4,057
Josephine	967	47.47%	732	35.94%	295	14.48%	20	0.98%	23	1.13%	235	11.54%	2,037
Klamath	634	54.61%	427	36.78%	82	7.06%	11	0.95%	7	0.60%	207	17.83%	1,161
Lake	465	60.78%	239	31.24%	53	6.93%	6	0.78%	2	0.26%	226	29.54%	765
Lane	3,313	54.91%	2,174	36.04%	422	6.99%	108	1.79%	16	0.27%	1,139	18.88%	6,033
Lincoln	595	58.51%	282	27.73%	119	11.70%	15	1.47%	6	0.59%	313	30.78%	1,017
Linn	2,202	48.87%	1,813	40.24%	333	7.39%	155	3.44%	3	0.07%	389	8.63%	4,506
Malheur	800	54.42%	543	36.94%	74	5.03%	53	3.61%	0	0.00%	257	17.48%	1,470
Marion	3,788	57.24%	2,239	33.83%	301	4.55%	275	4.16%	15	0.23%	1,549	23.41%	6,618
Morrow	680	62.10%	272	24.84%	111	10.14%	24	2.19%	8	0.73%	408	37.26%	1,095
Multnomah	17,819	59.82%	9,850	33.07%	1,454	4.88%	629	2.11%	35	0.12%	7,969	26.75%	29,787
Polk	1,456	51.87%	1,113	39.65%	159	5.66%	75	2.67%	4	0.14%	343	12.22%	2,807
Sherman	437	58.27%	252	33.60%	35	4.67%	25	3.33%	1	0.13%	185	24.67%	750
Tillamook	641	60.13%	253	23.73%	128	12.01%	39	3.66%	5	0.47%	388	36.40%	1,066
Umatilla	2,328	55.63%	1,568	37.47%	180	4.30%	109	2.60%	0	0.00%	760	18.16%	4,185
Union	1,510	50.67%	1,191	39.97%	232	7.79%	36	1.21%	11	0.37%	319	10.70%	2,980
Wallowa	905	58.69%	506	32.81%	109	7.07%	20	1.30%	2	0.13%	399	25.88%	1,542
Wasco	1,309	57.14%	764	33.35%	155	6.77%	58	2.53%	5	0.22%	545	23.79%	2,291
Washington	2,319	61.96%	1,153	30.80%	137	3.66%	124	3.31%	10	0.27%	1,166	31.15%	3,743
Wheeler	418	61.65%	236	34.81%	9	1.33%	14	2.06%	1	0.15%	182	26.84%	678
Yamhill	1,980	54.49%	1,246	34.29%	167	4.60%	236	6.49%	5	0.14%	734	20.20%	3,634
Totals	62,530	56.39%	38,049	34.31%	7,322	6.60%	2,682	2.42%	309	0.28%	24,481	22.08%	110,892

== See also ==
- United States presidential elections in Oregon
