= Wally Hicks =

American politician

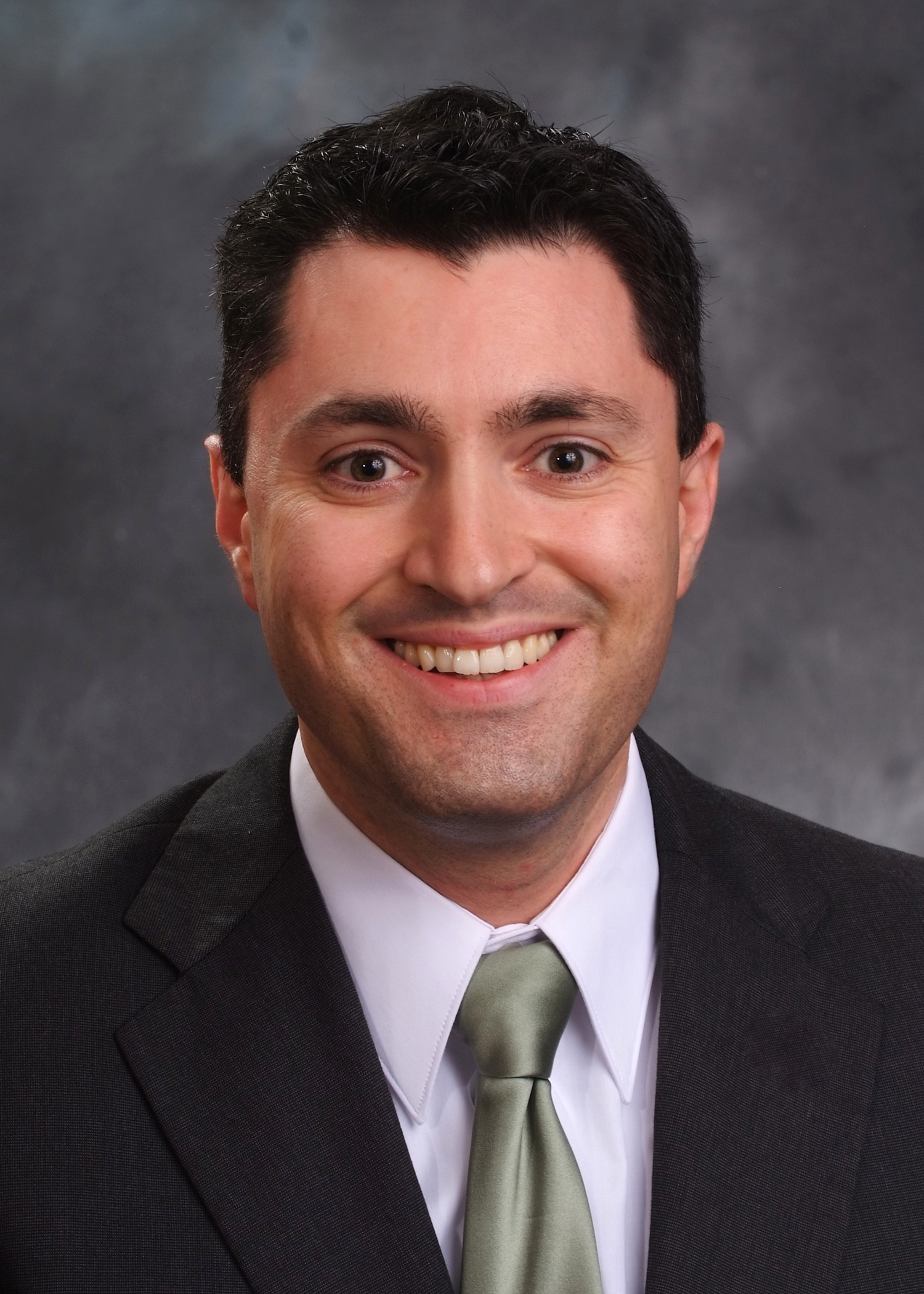

Member of the Oregon House of Representatives from the 3rd district
- In office January 10, 2011 – January 12, 2015
- Preceded by: Ron Maurer
- Succeeded by: Carl Wilson

Personal details
- Born: September 11, 1976 (age 50) Eugene, Oregon
- Party: Republican
- Education: University of Oregon

Matthew Walter Hicks (born September 11, 1976) is a Republican politician from the U.S. state of Oregon. He served in the Oregon House of Representatives from 2011 to 2015, representing District 3, which encompasses most of Josephine County, including the cities of Grants Pass and Cave Junction.

== Early life ==
Hicks was born on September 11, 1976, in Eugene, Oregon. He was raised in Eugene, Oregon until 1984 when his single mother, a newspaper journalist, accepted a reporting position at The Dalles Chronicle in The Dalles, Oregon. Hicks' mother remarried in 1988, and consequently, they moved to Westminster, Maryland.

Hicks received his Eagle Scout badge at the age of 16. At age 17, Hicks graduated from Westminster High School, having achieved a record of perfect attendance there, and enlisted in the Marine Corps shortly afterward. Hicks turned 18 while he was at Marine Corps boot camp on Paris Island, South Carolina.

== Military service ==
Twenty-two months after his enlistment, Hicks was appointed to the United States Naval Academy at Annapolis, Maryland, having been nominated from the enlisted ranks by the Secretary of the Navy. Upon graduating in 2000 with a Bachelor of Science degree in history, Hicks was commissioned as a second lieutenant in the Marine Corps. Hicks received the Joint Service Commendation Medal for his service as a first lieutenant in the Iraq War, and he is the second Iraq War veteran ever elected to the Oregon Legislature.

== Post Military Life ==
Upon being honorably discharged from the Marine Corps at the rank of captain, Hicks initially worked for the United States Department of Justice Office of Immigration Litigation in Washington D.C. as a volunteer law clerk. He then enrolled at the University of Oregon (U of O) School of Law and graduated one semester early. In 2008 Hicks began working as a deputy district attorney for Josephine County. He lives in Grants Pass, Oregon with his wife and daughters.

== Political career ==
In 2010, Hicks filed to run for Oregon House District 3 shortly after incumbent Rep. Ron Maurer announced that he would not seek reelection. Hicks, a Republican, received the nomination of his party in the primary election, as well as the nomination of the Independent Party of Oregon and the Democratic Party after winning as the write-in candidate. In the general election, Hicks received 77.89% of the vote over Barbara Gonzalez of the Constitution Party. On January 10, 2011, he was sworn in as a member of Oregon's 76th legislative assembly.

Hicks serves as the Co-Vice chair of the House Judiciary Committee, as Co-Vice Chair of the Joint Ways and Means Subcommittee on Public Safety, and on the Advisory Committee on State Court Facilities.

Hicks was the originator and chief sponsor of HJR 44, which corrects and updates certain non-substantive language in the Oregon Constitution. Oregon's Chief Justice, Paul De Muniz, and Co-Speaker of the House Rep. Bruce Hanna, testified in favor of the bill. The measure was passed by voters in the November 2012 general election.

At the end of the 2011 long session, the Oregonian calculated that Hicks voted with the majority of his party 83.33% of the time, which was less than any other member of the House of Representatives. His support and advocacy in animal-related measures saw him labeled as a 2011 "Top Dog" by the Oregon Humane Society. In 2011, the John F. Kennedy School of Government at Harvard University awarded Hicks a certificate of completion for the Senior Executives in State and Local Government program. Rep. Hicks was unanimously elected whip of the Oregon House Republican caucus in November 2013.

In May 2014 Hicks was elected as the Josephine County Legal Counsel by defeating the twenty-year incumbent with 61% of the vote.
