= Oregon's 3rd House district =

Legislative districts in the state of Oregon

Oregon's 3rd House district after redistricting after the 2020 Census

District 3 of the Oregon House of Representatives is one of 60 House legislative districts in the state of Oregon. As of 2021, the boundary for the district includes a portion of Josephine County and is centered around Grants Pass. The current representative for the district is Republican Dwayne Yunker of Grants Pass.

== Election results ==
District boundaries have changed over time. Therefore, representatives before 2021 may not represent the same constituency as today. General election results from 2000 to present are as follows:

Year	Candidate	Party	Percent	Opponent	Party	Percent	Opponent	Party	Percent	Opponent	Party	Percent	Write-in percentage
2000	Bruce Starr	Republican	56.36%	Cathy Lamb-Mullin	Democratic	39.65%	David Hintz	Libertarian	4.00%	No fourth candidate			
2002	Gordon Anderson	Republican	70.02%	Dale Matthews	Green	28.65%	No third candidate			No fourth candidate			1.32%
2004	Gordon Anderson	Republican	63.69%	Kevin Marr	Democratic	32.14%	Shane Savoie	Libertarian	4.17%	No fourth candidate			
2006	Ron Maurer	Republican	62.44%	Howard Owens	Democratic	37.35%	No third candidate			No fourth candidate			0.21%
2008	Ron Maurer	Republican	61.25%	Julie Rubenstein	Democratic	38.50%	No third candidate			No fourth candidate			0.26%
2010	Wally Hicks	Republican	77.93%	Barbara Gonzalez	Constitution	21.05%	No third candidate			No fourth candidate			1.02%
2012	Wally Hicks	Republican	75.21%	Barbara Gonzalez	Constitution	12.25%	Johnie Wayne Scott	Libertarian	11.85%	No fourth candidate			0.69%
2014	Carl Wilson	Republican	64.14%	Tom Johnson	Democratic	26.35%	Mark Seligman	Libertarian	6.50%	Barbara Gonzalez	Constitution	2.67%	0.35%
2016	Carl Wilson	Republican	72.39%	Tom Johnson	Democratic	27.29%	No third candidate			No fourth candidate			0.32%
2018	Carl Wilson	Republican	69.15%	Jerry Morgan	Democratic	30.59%	No third candidate			No fourth candidate			0.26%
2020	Lily Morgan	Republican	66.75%	Jerry Morgan	Democratic	32.77%	No third candidate			No fourth candidate			0.48%
2022	Lily Morgan	Republican	68.16%	Brady W. Keister	Democratic	31.65%	No third candidate			No fourth candidate			0.19%
2024	Dwayne Yunker	Republican	66.6%	Mark J Seligman	Democratic	31.0%	No third candidate			No fourth candidate			2.5%

== See also ==
- Oregon Legislative Assembly
- Oregon House of Representatives
