= Oregon's 28th Senate district =

American legislative district

Oregon's 28th Senate District as of September 27, 2021

District 28 of the Oregon State Senate comprises all of Klamath County as well as parts of Deschutes and Jackson counties. The district is composed of Oregon House districts 55 and 56. It is currently represented by Republican Diane Linthicum of Beatty.

== Election results ==
District boundaries have changed over time. Therefore, senators before 2013 may not represent the same constituency as today. From 1993 until 2003, it covered parts of north-central and eastern Oregon; from 2003 until 2013, the district shifted to its current location covering central and southern Oregon, incorporating all of Crook and Klamath counties as well as parts of Deschutes, Jackson, and Lake counties; and from 2013 until 2023, the borders of the district changed only marginally, losing a small area in Jackson County and picking up much of southern Deschutes County.

The current district is similar to its previous iterations, but with some major changes. The district no longer covers any of Crook or Lake counties while covering more of southern Deschutes County.

The results are as follows:

Year	Candidate	Party	Percent	Opponent	Party	Percent
1984	Kenneth Jernstedt	Republican	55.9%	Don Smith	Democratic	44.1%
1988	Wayne Fawbush	Democratic	50.1%	Bill C. Bellamy	Republican	49.9%
1992	Wes Cooley	Republican	55.6%	Wayne Fawbush	Democratic	44.4%
1996	Ted Ferrioli	Republican	52.5%	Kevin M. Campbell	Democratic	47.4%
2000	Ted Ferrioli	Republican	64.9%	Vernon Cook	Democratic	34.9%
2004	Doug Whitsett	Republican	70.1%	Ross Carroll	Democratic	29.9%
2008	Doug Whitsett	Republican	97.6%	Unopposed		
2012	Doug Whitsett	Republican	97.8%	Unopposed		
2016	Dennis Linthicum	Republican	61.3%	Todd Kepple	Democratic	38.2%
2020	Dennis Linthicum	Republican	72.7%	Hugh Palcic	Democratic	27.1%
2024	Diane Linthicum	Republican	69.32%	Dylan Gutridge	Democratic	30.68%
