= 1896 United States presidential election in Oregon =

- November 3, 1896

| Nominee | William McKinley | William Jennings Bryan |
| Party | Republican | Democratic |
| Alliance | | Silver Republican; Populist |
| Home state | Ohio | Nebraska |
| Running mate | Garret Hobart | Thomas E. Watson |
| Electoral vote | 4 | 0 |
| Popular vote | 48,779 | 46,739 |
| Percentage | 50.07% | 47.98% |
County results
McKinley
40–50%
50–60%
60–70%
Bryan
40–50%
50–60%
60–70%
President before election
Grover Cleveland
Democratic
Elected President
William McKinley
Republican

The 1896 United States presidential election in Oregon took place on November 3, 1896. All 45 contemporary states participated in the 1896 United States presidential election. State voters chose four electors for the Electoral College, which was responsible for selecting the president and vice president.

Oregon was won by the Republican nominees, former Ohio Governor William McKinley and his running mate Garret Hobart of New Jersey, defeating the Democratic nominee William Jennings Bryan of Nebraska and his Populist running mate Thomas E. Watson of Georgia.

McKinley won the state by a narrow margin of 2.09%.

Bryan would later lose Oregon to McKinley again four years later and would lose the state for a third time against William Howard Taft in 1908.

== Results ==
General Election Results
| Party | Pledged to | Elector | Votes |
|---|---|---|---|
| Republican Party | William McKinley | T. T. Geer | 48,779 |
| Republican Party | William McKinley | E. L. Smith | 48,711 |
| Republican Party | William McKinley | John F. Caples | 48,700 |
| Republican Party | William McKinley | S. M. Yoran | 48,568 |
| Democratic Party | William Jennings Bryan | N. L. Butler | 46,739 |
| Democratic Party | William Jennings Bryan | E. Hofer | 46,662 |
| Democratic Party | William Jennings Bryan | W. H. Spaugh | 46,554 |
| Democratic Party | William Jennings Bryan | Harry Watkins | 46,518 |
| National Democratic Party | John M. Palmer | Lewis B. Cox | 977 |
| Prohibition Party | Joshua Levering | D. Bowerman | 919 |
| Prohibition Party | Joshua Levering | C. J. Bright | 876 |
| Prohibition Party | Joshua Levering | Leslie Butler | 864 |
| Prohibition Party | Joshua Levering | C. E. Hoskins | 839 |
| National Democratic Party | John M. Palmer | Alex M. Holmes | 829 |
| National Democratic Party | John M. Palmer | Curtis J. Trenchard | 802 |
| National Democratic Party | John M. Palmer | Frank A. Seufert | 798 |
| Votes cast (Note: Based on totals for highest elector on each ticket) | | | 97,414 |

=== Results by county ===
| County | William McKinley Republican | | William Jennings Bryan Democratic | | John McAuley Palmer National Democratic | | Joshua Levering Prohibition | | Margin | | Total votes cast |
| County | # | % | # | % | # | % | # | % | # | % | Total votes cast |
|---|---|---|---|---|---|---|---|---|---|---|---|
| Baker | 951 | 33.35% | 1,860 | 65.22% | 35 | 1.23% | 6 | 0.21% | -909 | -31.87% | 2,852 |
| Benton | 1,074 | 50.85% | 992 | 46.97% | 23 | 1.09% | 23 | 1.09% | 82 | 3.88% | 2,112 |
| Clackamas | 2,664 | 51.79% | 2,386 | 46.38% | 46 | 0.89% | 48 | 0.93% | 278 | 5.40% | 5,144 |
| Clatsop | 1,849 | 60.56% | 1,135 | 37.18% | 29 | 0.95% | 40 | 1.31% | 714 | 23.39% | 3,053 |
| Columbia | 1,022 | 54.30% | 831 | 44.16% | 15 | 0.80% | 14 | 0.74% | 191 | 10.15% | 1,882 |
| Coos | 1,105 | 40.79% | 1,558 | 57.51% | 26 | 0.96% | 20 | 0.74% | -453 | -16.72% | 2,709 |
| Crook | 607 | 49.67% | 575 | 47.05% | 39 | 3.19% | 1 | 0.08% | 32 | 2.62% | 1,222 |
| Curry | 300 | 48.70% | 301 | 48.86% | 7 | 1.14% | 8 | 1.30% | -1 | -0.16% | 616 |
| Douglas | 1,917 | 47.66% | 2,059 | 51.19% | 21 | 0.52% | 25 | 0.62% | -142 | -3.53% | 4,022 |
| Gilliam | 551 | 53.65% | 470 | 45.76% | 3 | 0.29% | 3 | 0.29% | 81 | 7.89% | 1,027 |
| Grant | 736 | 44.55% | 867 | 52.48% | 37 | 2.24% | 12 | 0.73% | -131 | -7.93% | 1,652 |
| Harney | 270 | 33.62% | 527 | 65.63% | 5 | 0.62% | 1 | 0.12% | -257 | -32.00% | 803 |
| Jackson | 1,387 | 36.62% | 2,354 | 62.14% | 24 | 0.63% | 23 | 0.61% | -967 | -25.53% | 3,788 |
| Josephine | 844 | 40.27% | 1,194 | 56.97% | 41 | 1.96% | 17 | 0.81% | -350 | -16.70% | 2,096 |
| Klamath | 346 | 41.94% | 463 | 56.12% | 8 | 0.97% | 8 | 0.97% | -117 | -14.18% | 825 |
| Lake | 351 | 47.69% | 383 | 52.04% | 2 | 0.27% | 0 | 0.00% | -32 | -4.35% | 736 |
| Lane | 2,215 | 44.94% | 2,594 | 52.63% | 75 | 1.52% | 45 | 0.91% | -379 | -7.69% | 4,929 |
| Lincoln | 583 | 50.22% | 557 | 47.98% | 13 | 1.12% | 8 | 0.69% | 26 | 2.24% | 1,161 |
| Linn | 2,064 | 42.06% | 2,736 | 55.76% | 36 | 0.73% | 71 | 1.45% | -672 | -13.69% | 4,907 |
| Malheur | 312 | 31.48% | 654 | 65.99% | 15 | 1.51% | 10 | 1.01% | -342 | -34.51% | 991 |
| Marion | 3,744 | 50.98% | 3,419 | 46.56% | 108 | 1.47% | 73 | 0.99% | 325 | 4.43% | 7,344 |
| Morrow | 586 | 50.96% | 544 | 47.30% | 15 | 1.30% | 5 | 0.43% | 42 | 3.65% | 1,150 |
| Multnomah | 11,824 | 63.53% | 6,453 | 34.67% | 178 | 0.96% | 156 | 0.84% | 5,371 | 28.86% | 18,611 |
| Polk | 1,253 | 47.34% | 1,334 | 50.40% | 22 | 0.83% | 38 | 1.44% | -81 | -3.06% | 2,647 |
| Sherman | 426 | 48.14% | 414 | 46.78% | 7 | 0.79% | 38 | 4.29% | 12 | 1.36% | 885 |
| Tillamook | 691 | 55.59% | 536 | 43.12% | 8 | 0.64% | 8 | 0.64% | 155 | 12.47% | 1,243 |
| Umatilla | 1,859 | 46.46% | 2,083 | 52.06% | 36 | 0.90% | 23 | 0.57% | -224 | -5.60% | 4,001 |
| Union | 1,303 | 37.37% | 2,155 | 61.80% | 19 | 0.54% | 10 | 0.29% | -852 | -24.43% | 3,487 |
| Wallowa | 380 | 36.33% | 642 | 61.38% | 11 | 1.05% | 13 | 1.24% | -262 | -25.05% | 1,046 |
| Wasco | 1,701 | 54.36% | 1,367 | 43.69% | 28 | 0.89% | 33 | 1.05% | 334 | 10.67% | 3,129 |
| Washington | 2,082 | 56.15% | 1,566 | 42.23% | 18 | 0.49% | 42 | 1.13% | 516 | 13.92% | 3,708 |
| Yamhill | 1,782 | 47.85% | 1,736 | 46.62% | 27 | 0.73% | 97 | 2.60% | 46 | 1.24% | 3,724 |
| Totals | 48,779 | 50.07% | 46,739 | 47.98% | 977 | 1.00% | 919 | 0.94% | 3,348 | 3.56% | 97,414 |

== See also ==
- United States presidential elections in Oregon
