= Dallas Heard =

American politician (born 1985)

Chair of the Oregon Republican Party
- In office February 20, 2021 – March 11, 2022
- Preceded by: Bill Currier
- Succeeded by: Herman Baertschiger Jr. (Acting)

Member of the Oregon State Senate from the 1st district
- In office April 17, 2018 – January 1, 2023
- Preceded by: Jeff Kruse
- Succeeded by: David Brock Smith

Member of the Oregon House of Representatives from the 2nd district
- In office January 12, 2015 – April 17, 2018
- Preceded by: Tim Freeman
- Succeeded by: Gary Leif

Personal details
- Born: 1985 (age 40–41) Roseburg, Oregon, U.S.
- Party: Republican
- Spouse: Hannah

Dallas Heard (born 1985) is an American politician. He served as a Republican member of the Oregon Senate from 2018 to 2023. Heard had previously served as a member of the Oregon House of Representatives from District 2 from 2015 until 2018.

Heard served as Chairman of the Oregon Republican Party from 2021 until his resignation in 2022, citing "evil" and a toxic environment within the party. In December 2022, he announced he would resign from his Senate seat at the beginning of the new year, citing the need to focus on his family.

== Career ==
=== Oregon House of Representatives ===
Heard was elected to succeed Tim Freeman in 2014. On December 1, 2019, an investigation commissioned by the Washington House of Representatives reported that a Washington state house member, alleged white supremacist Matt Shea, had planned and participated in domestic terrorism on at least three occasions. On December 19, he was accused of domestic terrorism in a bipartisan report released by the Washington State House of Representatives. This included Shea's participation, organizing, planning and promotion of the 2014 Bundy standoff in Nevada, a 2015 armed conflict in Priest River, Idaho, and the 2016 armed Occupation of the Malheur National Wildlife Refuge in Harney County, Oregon. Shea led a delegation of right-wing legislators from Oregon, Washington and Idaho who, without disclosing their true intent, met with law enforcement officers on January 9, 2016, in Burns, Oregon. There they were appraised of intended law enforcement strategies for dealing with the refuge's occupiers. The state House district's Republican Representative, later Congressman, Cliff Bentz, attended the meeting, despite being urged by Harney County Judge Steven Grasty to decline the invitation. Bentz did, however, warn then-state Representative Heard that it would be "inappropriate" that he attend, though Heard ignored the advice. Shea then disclosed those confidential law enforcement intention details to the Bundys' occupying group, according to the report.

=== Oregon Senate ===
After Republican state senator Jeff Kruse resigned effective March 15, 2018, subsequent to being accused of sexual harassment of legislative staffers, then-Representative Heard was appointed to fill the vacated senate seat on April 9, 2018. On June 20, 2019, all 11 Oregon Republican state senators, including Heard, walked out of the Oregon State Capitol to prevent a vote on a cap-and-trade bill meant to help address global warming. The walkouts prevented a vote on the bill, due to the inability of the Senate to reach a quorum necessary for voting.

On December 21, 2020, a special session of the state legislature was convened to deal with issues relating to the COVID-19 pandemic. It was interrupted by armed protesters who gassed police. after being given access to the session through a locked outside door by Mike Nearman, a Republican state representative, who was later convicted and expelled from the legislature. During the turmoil, Heard accused the legislature of being involved in a "campaign against the people and the children of God," ripped off his mask, and left the senate floor. Heard encouraged that demonstration where protesters pepper-sprayed police, broke windows and physically assaulted reporters. Endorsing the siege, Heard said, "I'm in full support of your right to enter your Capitol building."

On January 6, 2021, Heard participated in an "unlawful assembly" at the Oregon Capitol. Heard addressed the right-wing crowds at the event. During the speech, he declared that the Capitol was "occupied" by "elitists" and that "I work with these fools. None of them are half as good as any of you and you need to bring the power to them!" Within an hour of Heard speaking, protestors stormed the Capitol building, breaching the doors and attacking police officers.

Heard was a co-founder of the Douglas County "Citizens Against Tyranny" organization and described the group in speeches he and state Senator Herman Baertschiger Jr. made at Garden Valley Church in Roseburg. The group doxed local whistleblowers, two elderly women, calling them "filthy traitors," for reporting businesses that were out-of-compliance with state COVID-19-control regulations that had been imposed by Oregon Governor Kate Brown, who delegated authority to assure compliance to the Oregon Occupational Safety and Health Division. The group asked local businesses to ban the individuals they doxed. Heard said the group's online posting of a list of names of whistleblowers who had complained about the failure of local businesses to abide by restrictions imposed to help control the COVID-19 pandemic in 2021. The names of those reporters should not have been publicized. Heard said Citizens Against Tyranny demanded all county officials sign an endorsement with the group and those who refuse should be "purged" from office.

On September 15, 2021, Heard arrived at Douglas High School at 6:30 a.m. intending to make a speech he said some students invited him to deliver. After he was ordered off the property, he said the school's administration forced him to depart. Heard had been setting up outdoors saying it had been his intention to make his speech outside in order to allow for social distancing. He said his speech would have concerned fundamental individual rights: "It is important to help the youth understand that government must always have certain restraints in order to ensure...freedoms for all individuals." He said he intended to tell them that bullying is unacceptable.

=== Oregon Republican Party Chair ===
On February 20, 2021, Heard was elected Chair of the Oregon Republican Party. His adding that role to his senate duties attracted dissent from his fellow Republican legislators. Two, Senators Lynn Findley and Bill Hansell, introduced bill 865 to prevent such possible conflicts.

== Personal ==
In May 2021, Heard admitted that he had contracted COVID-19 in April, that his father had also become ill and his brother had been hospitalized.

== Electoral history ==
2014 Oregon State Representative, 2nd district
Party	Candidate	Votes	%
Republican	Dallas Heard	13,337	62.7
Democratic	Kerry Atherton	6,676	31.4
Libertarian	Jeff Adams	1,203	5.7
Write-in		68	0.3
Total votes		21,284	100%

2016 Oregon State Representative, 2nd district
Party	Candidate	Votes	%
Republican	Dallas Heard	20,024	97.5
Write-in		512	2.5
Total votes		20,536	100%

2020 Oregon State Senator, 1st district
Party	Candidate	Votes	%
Republican	Dallas Heard	51,417	68.6
Democratic	Kat Stone	23,369	31.2
Write-in		124	0.2
Total votes		74,910	100%

Party political offices
Preceded by Bill Currier	Chair of the Oregon Republican Party; 2021–2022	Succeeded by Herman Baertschiger Jr. Acting
