= Precinct captain =

Local political party position, usually elected

A precinct captain (also known as a precinct chair, delegate, committee officer, committee member, or committeeperson) is an elected official in the American political party system. The captain establishes a direct link between a political party and the voters in a local electoral precinct. Their role is to build a relationship between those who hold public office and those who vote at the polls.

Election to the office is by ballot or by the county party executive committee. Voters file their declaration of candidacy with their party in their voting district. If elected during the primary, the Precinct Captain shall serve as long as one remains eligible, or until seeking reelection in the subsequent district primary. Requirements vary among states and counties.

Responsibilities of the post include facilitating voter registration and absentee ballot access; leading get out the vote outreach efforts; distributing campaign and party literature; promoting the party; and addressing voter concerns. In many states Precinct Captains are also eligible to establish party unit committees for fundraising.

The concept of precinct leadership is to provide a grassroots position with officials generally serving as volunteers, though in some states they receive a stipend. Positions of county captain have also been created, but are usually used for election campaigns rather than party organizing.

== Office title designation by state ==
Titles may vary by political party.

- Alabama – Unknown
- Alaska – Unknown
- Arizona – Precinct Committeeman
- Arkansas – Unknown
- California – Precinct Committeemen
- Colorado – Precinct Committee Person (Republican) ~ Precinct Organizer or Block Captain (Democrat)
- Connecticut – Town Committeeman
- Delaware – City Committee Member in Wilmington, Delaware, County Committee Member in the rest of Delaware
- Florida – Precinct Captain (Democrat) Precinct Committeeman (Republican)
- Georgia – Precinct Captain
- Hawaii – Precinct Committee
- Idaho – Precinct Committeeman
- Illinois – Precinct Committeeman
- Indiana – Precinct Committeeman
- Iowa – Precinct Captain
- Kansas – Precinct Captain
- Kentucky – Precinct Captain (with allowances for a Co-Captain and a Youth Captain for at least the Republican party)
- Louisiana – unknown
- Maine – unknown
- Maryland – Precinct Captain
- Massachusetts – Town Committeeman
- Michigan – Precinct Delegate (officially, but less commonly, referred to as Delegate To County Convention)
- Minnesota – Block Captain
- Mississippi – unknown
- Missouri – unknown
- Montana – Precinct Officer
- Nebraska – unknown
- Nevada – Precinct Captain
- New Hampshire – unknown
- New Jersey – County Committeeman or Committeewoman
- New Mexico – Ward Chair
- New York – District Leader
- North Carolina – Precinct Chairman
- North Dakota – Precinct Committee Person
- Ohio – Precinct Captain
- Oklahoma – Precinct Chair
- Oregon – Precinct Committee Person
- Pennsylvania – Precinct Committee Member (Republican) ~ Precinct Committee Person (Democrat)
- Rhode Island – unknown
- South Carolina – Precinct President
- South Dakota – Precinct Committeeman or Committeewoman
- Tennessee – Precinct Committeeman or Committeewoman
- Texas – Precinct Chair
- Utah – Precinct Chair
- Vermont – unknown
- Virginia – Precinct Committeeman
- Washington – Precinct Committee Officer
- West Virginia – unknown
- Wisconsin – Committeeman or Committeewoman
- Wyoming – precinct committeeman and committeewoman

== Public elections ==
The following states hold public elections for precinct captains on the primary ballot:

- Arizona
- Florida
- Idaho
- Illinois
- Indiana
- Kansas
- Ohio
- Oregon
- Pennsylvania
- South Dakota
- Texas
- Washington
- Wyoming

== Sources ==
- Lincoln, Abraham and Don E. Fehrenbacher. Speeches and writings. page 66. Online Google Books. June 19, 2008.
- Advanced Placement U.S. Government and Politics Online. June 19, 2008.
