= 35th Oregon Legislative Assembly =

←	34th Legislative Assembly	36th Legislative Assembly	→
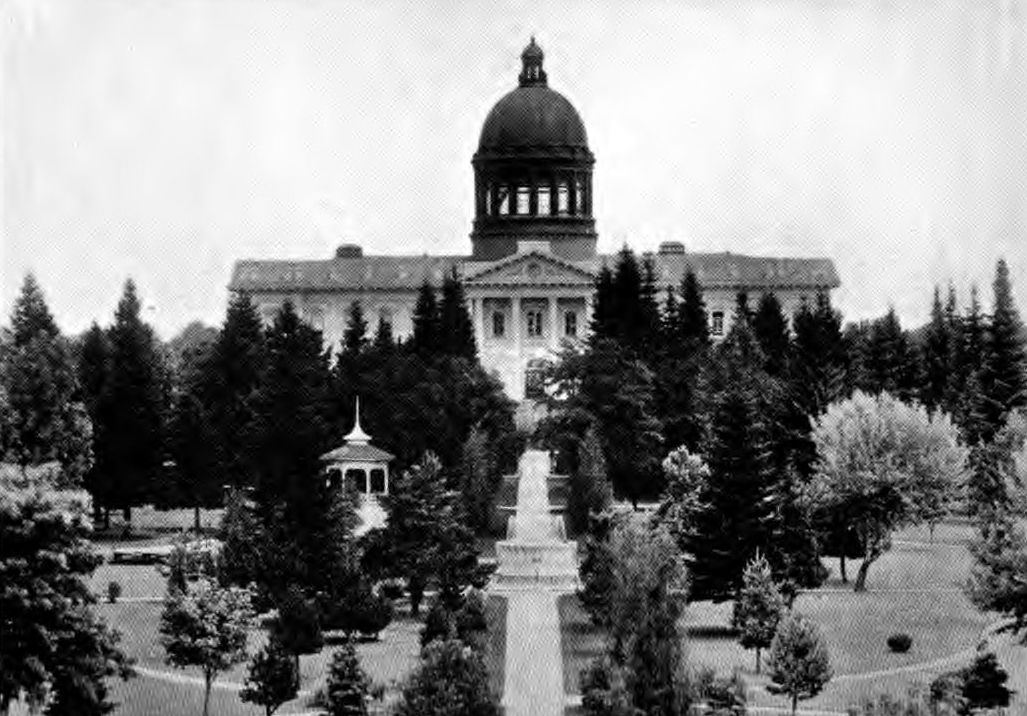
- Second Oregon State Capitol

Overview
- Legislative body: Oregon Legislative Assembly
- Jurisdiction: Oregon, United States
- Meeting place: Oregon State Capitol
- Term: 1929–1930

Oregon State Senate
- Members: 30 Senators
- Senate President: A. W. Norblad
- Majority Leader: ?
- Minority Leader: ?
- Party control: Republican Party

Oregon House of Representatives
- Members: 60 Representatives
- Speaker of the House: R. S. Hamilton
- Majority Leader: ?
- Minority Leader: ?
- Party control: Republican Party

The thirty-fifth Oregon Legislative Assembly convened in 1929 for its biennial regular session, starting January 14 and finishing March 4. Republicans controlled both chambers with overwhelming majorities. Only four Democrats, two in the House and two in the Senate, were members of the thirty-fifth Legislative Assembly. The body held no special sessions; no such sessions were held at all between 1921 and 1933.

== House members ==
All representatives in the thirty-fifth House were Republicans except two, Walter S. Fisher (D–4 Roseburg) and Joseph N. Scott (D–22 Pendleton).

Speaker of the House: R. S. Hamilton (R–21 Bend).

District	Representative	Residence	Counties	Party
1	Romeo Gouley	Brooks	Marion	Republican
1	Lee McAllister	Salem	Marion	Republican
1	Frank W. Settlemier	Woodburn	Marion	Republican
1	W. Carlton Smith	Salem	Marion	Republican
2	Charles Childs	Albany	Linn	Republican
2	Hector Macpherson, Sr.	Albany	Linn	Republican
3	Emmett Howard	Eugene	Lane	Republican
3	Lynn S. McCready	Eugene	Lane	Republican
3	E. O. Potter	Eugene	Lane	Republican
4	Walter S. Fisher	Roseburg	Douglas	Democratic
4	Charles A. Lockwood	Roseburg	Douglas	Republican
5	J. E. Norton	Coquille	Coos	Republican
6	Louis L. Knapp	Port Orford	Coos; Curry	Republican
7	James T. Chinnock	Grants Pass	Josephine	Republican
8	William M. Briggs	Ashland	Jackson	Republican
8	John H. Carkin	Medford	Jackson	Republican
9	James H. Hazlett	Hood River	Hood River	Republican
10	B. W. Johnson	Monroe	Benton	Republican
11	S. L. Stewart	Rickreall	Polk	Republican
12	Herbert Egbert	The Dalles	Wasco	Republican
13	Walter W. Russell	McMinnville	Yamhill	Republican
13	Morton Tompkins	Dayton	Yamhill	Republican
14	B. F. Swope	Independence	Lincoln; Polk	Republican
15	Charles R. La Follett	Cornelius	Washington	Republican
15	R. Frank Peters	Hillsboro	Washington	Republican
15	L. E. Wilkes	Hillsboro	Washington	Republican
16	H. H. Chindgren	Molalla	Clackamas	Republican
16	J. F. Clark	Oregon City	Clackamas	Republican
16	Charles T. Sievers	Oregon City	Clackamas	Republican
17	C. H. Oxman	Ontario	Malheur	Republican
18	Gust. Anderson	Portland	Multnomah	Republican
18	Homer D. Angell	Portland	Multnomah	Republican
18	Earl C. Bronaugh, Jr.	Portland	Multnomah	Republican
18	Allen A. Bynon	Portland	Multnomah	Republican
18	Barnett H. Goldstein	Portland	Multnomah	Republican
18	Wilber Henderson	Portland	Multnomah	Republican
18	K. K. Kubli	Portland	Multnomah	Republican
18	Dorothy M. Lee	Portland	Multnomah	Republican
18	Frank J. Lonergan	Portland	Multnomah	Republican
18	Neil Malarkey	Portland	Multnomah	Republican
18	John B. McCourt	Portland	Multnomah	Republican
18	Allen G. Rushlight	Portland	Multnomah	Republican
18	Harvey Wells	Portland	Multnomah	Republican
19	Mark J. Johnson	Astoria	Clatsop	Republican
19	Charles W. Robison	Astoria	Clatsop	Republican
20	Glen R. Metsker	St. Helens	Columbia	Republican
21	Denton G. Burkick	Redmond	Crook; Deschutes; Jefferson; Klamath; Lake	Republican
21	A. M. Collier	Klamath Falls	Crook; Deschutes; Jefferson; Klamath; Lake	Republican
21	R. S. Hamilton	Bend	Crook; Deschutes; Jefferson; Klamath; Lake	Republican
22	Joseph N. Scott	Pendleton	Morrow; Umatilla	Democratic
23	J. S. Norvell	Helix	Umatilla	Republican
23	James H. E. Scott	Milton	Umatilla	Republican
24	T. G. Johnson	Wallowa	Union; Wallowa	Republican
25	H. H. Weatherspoon	Elgin	Union	Republican
26	A. V. Swift	Baker	Baker	Republican
27	R. A. Ford	Dayville	Grant; Harney	Republican
28	Earl Snell	Arlington	Gilliam; Sherman; Wheeler	Republican
28	J. P. Yates	Wasco	Gilliam; Sherman; Wheeler	Republican
29	George P. Winslow	Tillamook	Tillamook	Republican
30	Frank E. Andrews	Portland	Clackamas; Multnomah	Republican

Messenger to the Senate: Catherine Addink
Reading Clerk: Elbert Bede
Chief Clerk: W. F. Drager
Asst. Chief Clerk: Harry McCallen
Mailing Clerk: William F. McAdams
Doorkeeper: Rolls Southwick
Asst. Doorkeepers: B. E. Robertson, Glen A. Tousley
Calendar Clerk: Ruby Russell
Sergeant-at-Arms: Joseph F. Singer
Asst. Sergeant-at-Arms: J. A. Waddell
Messenger to the Printer: John F. Steelhammer
Pages: Denton Burdick, Jr., Harold Charters, Margarte Davidson

== Senate members ==
All members of the thirty-fifth Senate were Republicans except two, Edward F. Bailey (D–3 Junction City) and W. H. Strayer (D–23 Baker).

Senate President: A. W. Norblad (R–15 Astoria) (appointed Governor of Oregon upon death of incumbent Isaac Patterson on December 22, 1929.)

District	Senator	Residence	Counties	Party
1	Sam H. Brown	Gervais	Marion	Republican
1	Lloyd T. Reynolds	Salem	Marion	Republican
2	Willard L. Marks	Albany	Linn	Republican
3	Edward F. Bailey	Junction City	Lane	Democratic
4	John B. Bell	Eugene	Lane; Linn	Republican
5	B. L. Eddy	Roseburg	Douglas	Republican
6	George W. Dunn	Ashland	Jackson	Republican
7	Ed. W. Miller	Grants Pass	Josephine	Republican
8	Charles Hall	Marshfield	Coos; Curry	Republican
9	Herbert J. Elliott	Perrydale	Benton; Polk	Republican
10	Clarence Butt	Newberg	Yamhill	Republican
11	Edward Schulmerich	Hillsboro	Washington	Republican
12	Linn E. Jones	Oregon City	Clackamas	Republican
13	John O. Bailey	Portland	Multnomah	Republican
13	J. E. Bennett	Portland	Multnomah	Republican
13	Henry L. Corbett	Portland	Multnomah	Republican
13	Milton R. Klepper	Portland	Multnomah	Republican
13	Gus C. Moser	Portland	Multnomah	Republican
13	Isaac E. Staples	Portland	Multnomah	Republican
14	Joe E. Dunne	Portland	Clackamas; Columbia; Multnomah	Republican
15	A. W. Norblad	Astoria	Clatsop	Republican
16	Henry L. Kuck	The Dalles	Hood River; Wasco	Republican
17	Jay H. Upton	Bend	Crook; Deschutes; Jefferson; Klamath; Lake	Republican
18	R. J. Carsner	Spray	Gilliam; Sherman; Wheeler	Republican
19	Fred E. Kiddle	Island City	Morrow; Umatilla; Union	Republican
20	L. L. Mann	Pendleton	Umatilla	Republican
21	Colon R. Eberhard	La Grande	Union; Wallowa	Republican
22	J. D. Billingsley	Ontario	Grant; Harney; Malheur	Republican
23	W. H. Strayer	Baker	Baker	Democratic
24	Earl E. Fisher	Beaverton	Lincoln; Tillamook; Washington; Yamhill	Republican

Doorkeeper: Joseph W. Beveridge
Sergeant-at-Arms: H. T. Bruce
Assistant Sergeant-at-Arms: F. A. Sutton
Chief Clerk: John P. Hunt
Assistant Chief Clerk: Elizabeth J. Glatt
Calendar Clerk: Albert D. Goddard
Reading Clerk: M. F. Hardesty
Pages: Clifford Flake, Max King, Edward Seeborg

== See also ==
- Oregon Legislative Assembly
- Oregon State Senate
- Oregon House of Representatives
- Government of Oregon

Preceded by 34th legislature	35th Oregon Legislative Assembly; 1929–1930	Succeeded by 36th legislature
