= 36th Oregon Legislative Assembly =

←	35th Legislative Assembly	37th Legislative Assembly	→
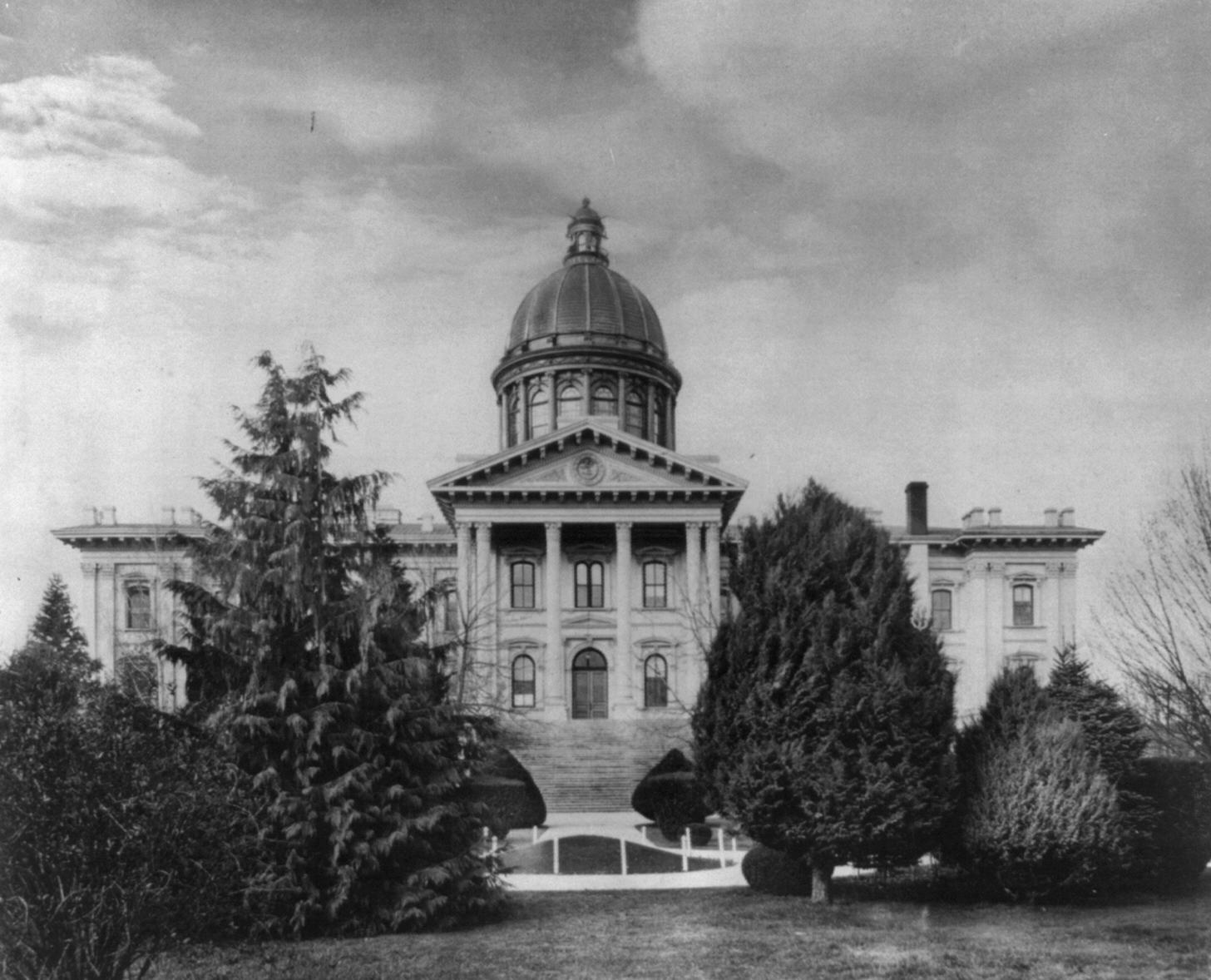
- The legislature took place in the second Oregon State Capitol, seen here in 1909

Overview
- Legislative body: Oregon Legislative Assembly
- Jurisdiction: Oregon, United States
- Meeting place: Oregon State Capitol
- Term: 1931
- Website: www.oregonlegislature.gov

Oregon State Senate
- Members: 30 Senators
- Senate President: Willard L. Marks (R)
- Party control: Republican Party of Oregon

Oregon House of Representatives
- Members: 60 Representatives
- Speaker of the House: Frank J. Lonergan (R)
- Party control: Republican Party of Oregon

The 36th Oregon Legislative Assembly was the legislative session of the Oregon Legislative Assembly that convened on January 12, 1931 and adjourned March 6, 1931.

== Senate ==
Affiliation	Members
Democratic	1
Republican	29

== Senate Members ==
Composition of the Senate
Senator	Residence	Party
J. O. Bailey	Portland	Republican
J. E. Bennett	Portland	Republican
J. D. Billingsley	Ontario	Republican
Dr. Joel C. Booth	Lebanon	Republican
Sam H. Brown	Gervais	Republican
William E. Burke	Sherwood	Republican
R. J. Carsner	Spray	Republican
James W. Crawford	Portland	Republican
George W. Dunn	Ashland	Republican
Joe E. Dunne	Portland	Republican
Colon R. Eberhard	La Grande	Republican
B. L. Eddy	Roseburg	Republican
Earl E. Fisher	Beaverton	Republican
F. M. Franciscovch	Astoria	Republican
Charles Hall	Marshfield (Now Coos Bay)	Republican
B. W. Johnson	Monroe	Republican
Linn E. Jones	Oregon City	Republican
Fred E. Kiddle	Island City	Republican
Henry L. Kuck	The Dalles	Republican
L. L. Mann	Pendleton	Republican
Willard L. Marks	Albany	Republican
Edward W. Miller	Grants Pass	Republican
Gus C. Moser	Portland	Republican
Edward Schulmerich	Hillsboro	Republican
Charles K. Spaulding	Salem	Republican
Isaac E. Staples	Portland	Republican
W. H. Strayer	Baker	Democratic
Jay H. Upton	Bend	Republican
Halvor C. Wheeler	Goshen	Republican
William F. Woodward	Portland	Republican

== House ==
Affiliation	Members
Democratic	7
Republican	53
Total	60

== House Members ==
Composition of the House
House Member	Residence	Party
L. F. Allen	Wallowa	Republican
Gust Anerson	Portland	Republican
Frank E. Andrews	Portland	Republican
Homer D. Angell	Portland	Republican
Earl D. Bronaugh Jr.	Portland	Republican
Allen A. Bynon	Portland	Republican
H. H. Chindgren	Molalla	Republican
James T. Chinnock	Grants Pass	Republican
Earl B. Day	Gold Hill	Republican
Perry O. DeLap	Klamath Falls	Republican
Halbert S. Deuel	Medford	Republican
Victor Eckley	La Grande	Democratic
Walter S. Fisher	Roseburg	Democratic
Ray W. Gill	Portland	Republican
David G. Glass	The Dalles	Democratic
Herbert Gordon	Portland	Republican
Romeo Gouley	Brooks	Republican
Ralph S. Hamilton	Bend	Republican
G. A. Hellberg	Astoria	Republican
Earl H. Hill	Cushman	Republican
Emmett Howard	Eugene	Republican
Alfred M. Jannsen	Beaverton	Republican
Mark J. Johnson	Astoria	Republican
Dorr E. Keasey	Portland	Republican
Louis L. Knapp	Port Orford	Republican
Arthur W. Lawrence	Corvallis	Republican
Dorothy McCullough Lee	Portland	Republican
John H. Lewis	Portland	Republican
Frank J. Lonergan	Portland	Republican
Hector Macpherson Sr.	Albany	Republican
John Manning	Portland	Democratic
Lee McAllister	Salem	Republican
Elwin A. McCormack	Eugene	Republican
John B. McCourt	Portland	Republican
H. E. McGraw	Vernonia	Republican
Arthur McPhillips	McMinnville	Democratic
James W. Mott	Salem	Republican
L. D. Nash	Nashville	Republican
B. F. Nichols	Riddle	Republican
J. E. Norton	Coquille	Republican
C. H. Oxman	Ontario	Republican
R. Frank Peters	Hillsboro	Republican
W. A. Proctor	Sandy	Republican
Arthur W. Schaupp	Klamath Falls	Republican
James H. E. Scott	MIlton	Republican
Joseph H. Scott	Pendleton	Democratic
Ernest C. Smith	Hood River	Republican
Lotta C. Smith	Salem	Republican
Earl W. Snell	Arlington	Republican
S. L. Stewart	Rickreall	Republican
W. E. Stockdale	Mt. Vernon	Republican
A. V. Swift	Baker	Republican
Gordon J. Taylor	Molalla	Republican
I. U. Temple	Pendleton	Republican
John A. Thornburgh	Forest Grove	Republican
Morton Tompkins	Dayton	Republican
J. J. Weatherford Jr.	Albany	Democratic
Harvey Wells	Portland	Republican
George P. Winslow	Tillamook	Republican
J. P. Yates	Wasco	Republican
