= Schulmerich =

Schulmerich may refer to:

- Edward Schulmerich (1863–1937), American businessman and politician
- Wes Schulmerich (1901–1985), American baseball player
- Schulmerich (bell maker), a handbell manufacturer in Hatfield, Pennsylvania
