= Carus (disambiguation) =

Carus as a surname may refer to:

- Carl Gustav Carus (1789-1869), German physiologist and painter
- Emma Carus (1879-1927), American contralto singer
- Julius Victor Carus (1823-1903), German zoologist and entomologist
- Marcus Aurelius Carus (c. 224-283), Roman emperor
- Paul Carus (1852-1919), German-American author, editor and philosopher
- Titus Lucretius Carus (c. 99 BC- c. 55 BC), Roman poet and philosopher
- Saint Carus of Malcesine, (Caro di Malcesine) often referenced with Benignus of Malcesine

Carus may also refer to:

- Carus and The True Believers, Australian band
- Carus Mathematical Monographs, book series published by the Mathematical Association of America
- Carus Lectures, lecture series convened by the American Philosophical Association
- Carus, Oregon, an unincorporated community in the United States
- Carus Publishing Company, American publishing company
- Carus-Verlag, German choral music publisher and record label
- Hegeler Carus Mansion, historic building in La Salle, Illinois, United States
