= Dibble House =

Dibble House may refer to:

- American Gothic House, in Eldon, Iowa
- Horace L. Dibble House, in Molalla, Oregon
