= 37th Oregon Legislative Assembly =

←	36th Legislative Assembly	38th Legislative Assembly	→
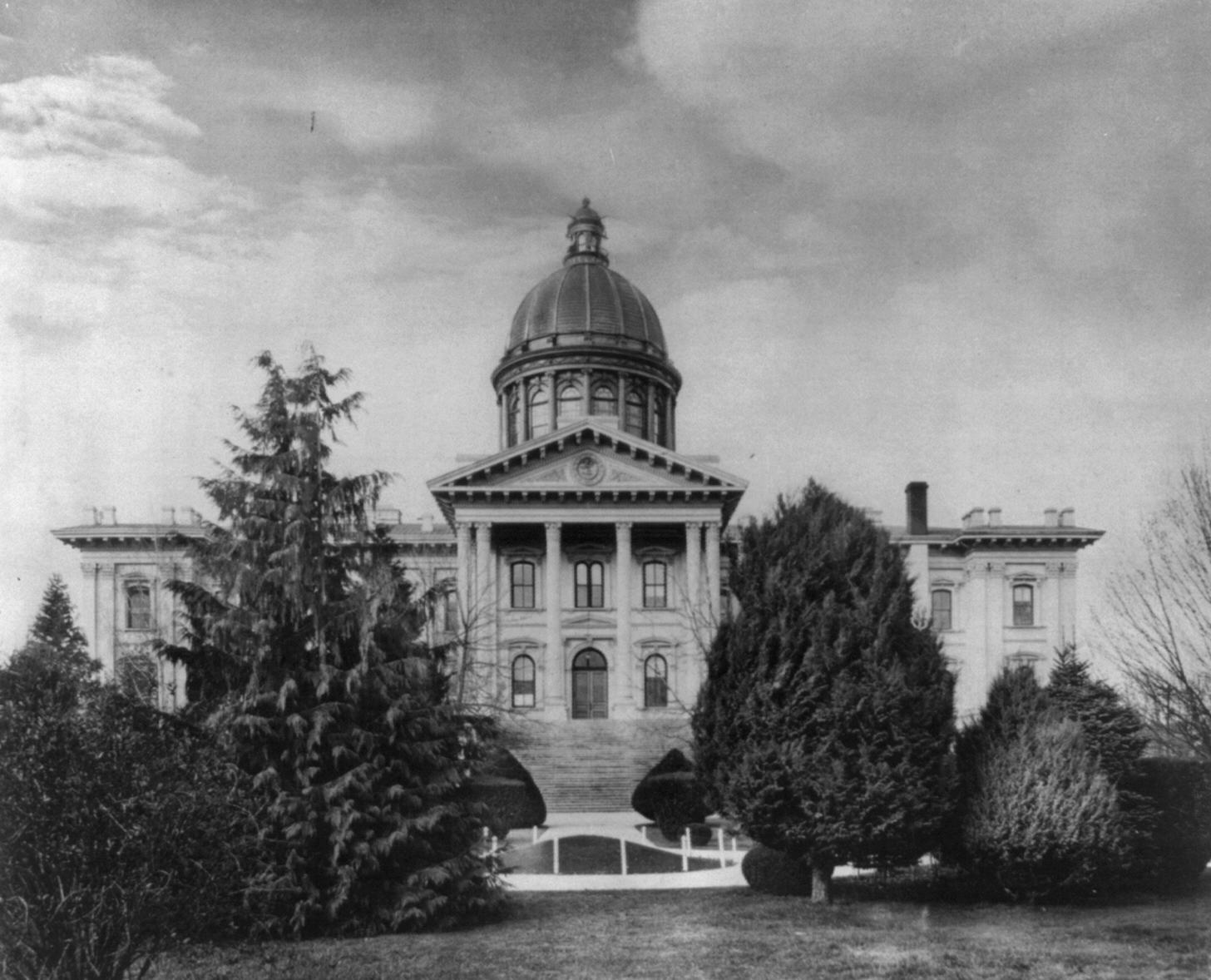
- The legislature took place in the second Oregon State Capitol, seen here in 1909

Overview
- Legislative body: Oregon Legislative Assembly
- Jurisdiction: Oregon, United States
- Meeting place: Oregon State Capitol
- Term: 1933
- Website: www.oregonlegislature.gov

Oregon State Senate
- Members: 30 Senators
- Senate President: Fred E. Kiddle (R)
- Party control: Republican Party of Oregon

Oregon House of Representatives
- Members: 60 Representatives
- Speaker of the House: Earl W. Snell (R)
- Party control: Republican Party of Oregon

The 37th Oregon Legislative Assembly was the legislative session of the Oregon Legislative Assembly that convened on January 9, 1933 and adjourned March 9, 1933. Two special sessions took place from January 3–7, and from November 20–December 9.

== Senate ==
Affiliation	Members
Democratic	8
Republican	22

== Senate Members ==
Composition of the Senate
Senator	Residence	Party
Edwin Allen	Forest Grove	Democratic
Dr. Joel C. Booth	Lebanon	Republican
Sam H. Brown	Gervais	Republican
William E. Burke	Sherwood	Republican
Allan A. Bynon	Portland	Republican
James T. Chinnock	Grants Pass	Republican
Henry L. Corbett	Portland	Republican
Ashby C. Dickson	Portland	Democratic
Robert M. Duncan	Burns	Republican
George W. Dunn	Ashland	Republican
Joe E. Dunne	Portland	Republican
Walter S. Fisher	Roseburg	Democratic
Frank M. Franciscovich	Astoria	Republican
John D. Goss	Marshfield (now Coos Bay)	Democratic
James H. Hazlett	Hood River	Democratic
Henry L. Hess	La Grande	Democratic
Arthur P. Ireland	Oregon City	Republican
Linn E. Jones (Note: Linn E. Jones resigned March 12. Arthur P. Ireland was appointed in 1933 for the second special session from November 20 to December 9)	Oregon City	Republican
Fred E. Kiddle	Island City	Republican
Dorothy McCullough Lee	Portland	Republican
L. L. Mann	Pendleton	Republican
J. N. McFadden	Corvallis	Democratic
Charles K. Spaulding	Salem	Republican
Isaac E. Staples	Portland	Republican
W. H. Strayer	Baker	Democratic
Jay H. Upton	Bend	Republican
Halvor C. Wheeler	Goshen	Republican
Clyde E. Williamson	Albany	Republican
William F. Woodward	Portland	Republican
J. P. Yates	Wasco	Republican
Peter C. Zimmerman	Yamhill	Republican

== House ==
Affiliation	Members
Democratic	18
Republican	41
Independent	1
Total	60

== House Members ==
Composition of the House
House Member	Residence	Party
Carle Abrams	Salem	Republican
L. F. Allen	Wallowa	Republican
John D. Beckham	Portland	Democratic
Howard C. Belton	Canby	Republican
William H. Bennett	Port Orford	Democratic
Dr. James A. Best	Pendleton	Republican
Charles Childs	Albany	Republican
Levi Chrisman	The Dalles	Republican
A. G. Clarke	Glendale	Republican
John E. Cooter	Toledo	Democratic
Dr. Ferdinand H. Dammasch	Portland	Republican
Earl B. Day	Gold Hill	Republican
Richard Deich	Portland	Republican
William L. Dickson	Portland	Democratic
W. B. Duerst	McMinnville	Democratic
Victor Eckley	La Grande	Democratic
Herbert Gordon	Portland	Republican
Romeo Gouley	Brooks	Republican
William L. Graham	Portland	Democratic
John Hubert Hall	Portland	Republican
Fred W. Herman	Ranier	Republican
H. C. Herron	Junction City	Democratic
Earl H. Hill	Cushman	Republican
Frank H. Hilton	Portland	Republican
Ralph W. Horan	Klamath Falls	Republican
Charles A. Huntington	Eugene	Republican
J. O. Johnson	Tigard	Republican
Edwin C. Judd	Astoria	Republican
Dorr E. Keasey	Portland	Republican
E. C. Kelly	Medford	Democratic
John Lang	Haines	Democratic
John H. Lewis	Portland	Republican
Frank J. Lonergan	Portland	Republican
M. A. Lynch	Redmond	Republican
Hannah Martin	Salem	Republican
E. J. McAlear	Hillsboro	Republican
J. H. McCloskey	Norway	Democratic
Elwin A. McCormack	Eugene	Republican
Arthur McPhillips	McMinnville	Democratic
W. T. Miller	Grants Pass	Democratic
B. F. Nichols	Riddle	Republican
James S. Oakes	Prineville	Republican
O. Henry Oleen	St. Helens	Democratic
Lowell C. Paget	Portland	Republican
Otto K. Paulus	Salem	Republican
Al. A. Price	Oregon City	Democratic
Donald J. Ryan	Oregon City	Republican
James H. E. Scott	Milton	Republican
Henry Semon	Klamath Falls	Independent
Estes Snecdor	Portland	Democratic
Earl W. Snell	Arlington	Republican
Warner B. Snider	Paisley	Republican
V. B. Staples	Ontario	Republican
W. E. Stockdale	Mt. Vernon	Republican
Jesse Ogden Turner	Heppner	Republican
Dean H. Walker	Independence	Republican
James K. Weatherford Jr.	Albany	Democratic
Harvey Wells	Portland	Republican
George P. Winslow	Tillamook	Republican
Teunis J. Wyers	Hood River	Democratic
