= Fox Park =

Fox Park may refer to:

- Fox Park (Molalla, Oregon)
- Fox Park, St. Louis
- Fox Park, Wyoming
