= Rock Creek Methodist Church =

Historic church in Oregon, United States

- U.S. National Register of Historic Places
- Location within Oregon Location within the United States
- Nearest city: Molalla, Oregon
- Coordinates: 45°9′31.6″N 122°42′51.3″W
- Area: 4.5 acres (1.8 ha)
- Built: 1858
- Built by: Killan, John
- NRHP reference No.: 75001580
- Added to NRHP: October 29, 1975

Rock Creek Methodist Church is a historic Methodist church building in Needy, Oregon near Canby, Oregon. It was built in 1858 and was added to the National Register of Historic Places in 1975.

It was deemed notable as one of few remaining circuit church buildings from early Oregon. According to its NRHP nomination, "The simple elegance of this structure stands as an example of the unpretentious lives of early Oregon settlers."

It is a one-story 20 by 24 feet (6.1 m × 7.3 m) building. John Killan led the construction. The vestibule was added in about 1920.
