= Long Park (Molalla, Oregon) =

Public park in Molalla, Oregon, U.S.

Leonard Long Park
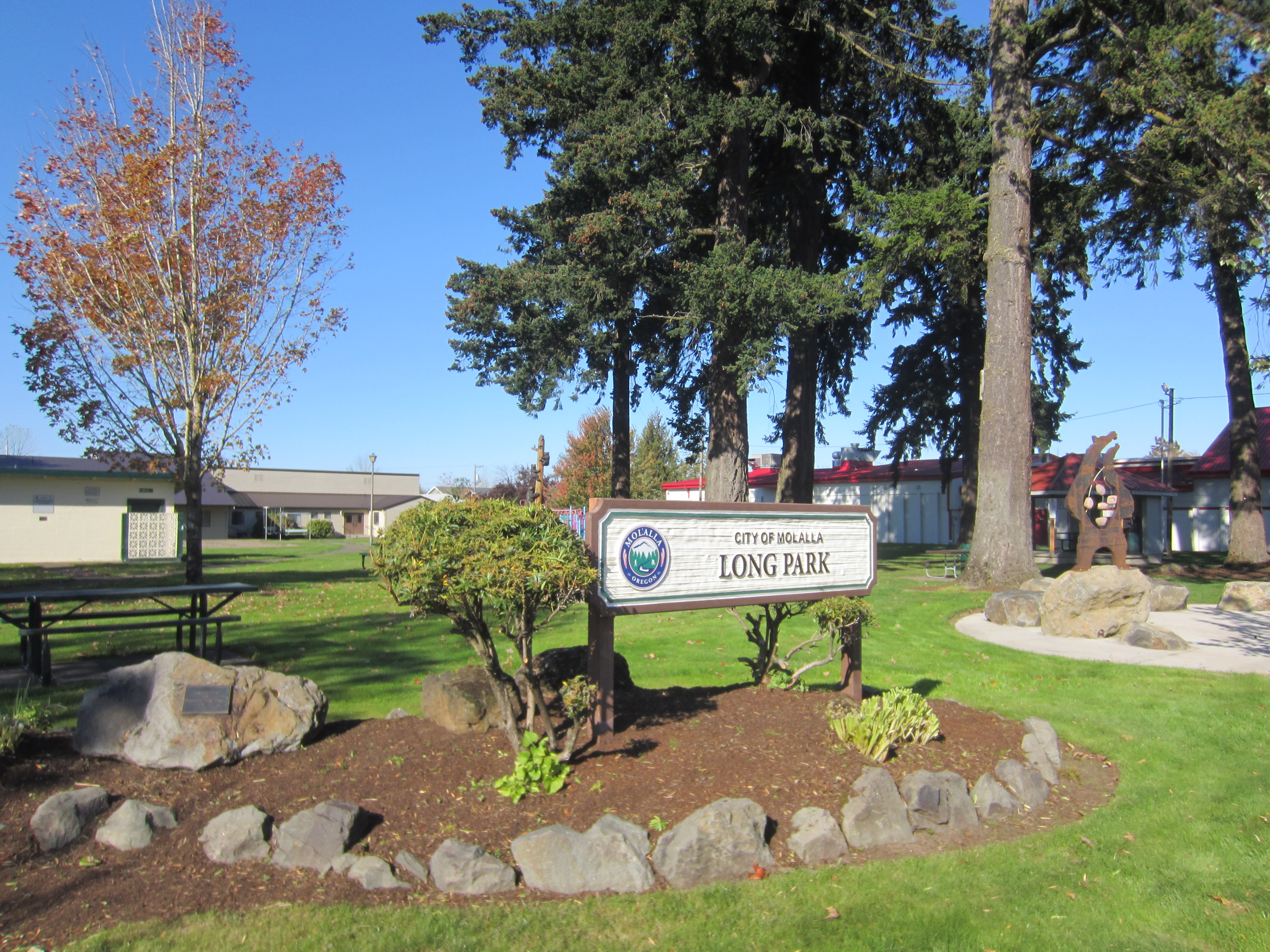
- Part of the park in 2020

- Location within Oregon
- Location: Molalla, Oregon, United States
- Coordinates: 45°8′59.5″N 122°34′38″W

Leonard Long Park, or simply Long Park, is a public park in Molalla, Oregon, United States.

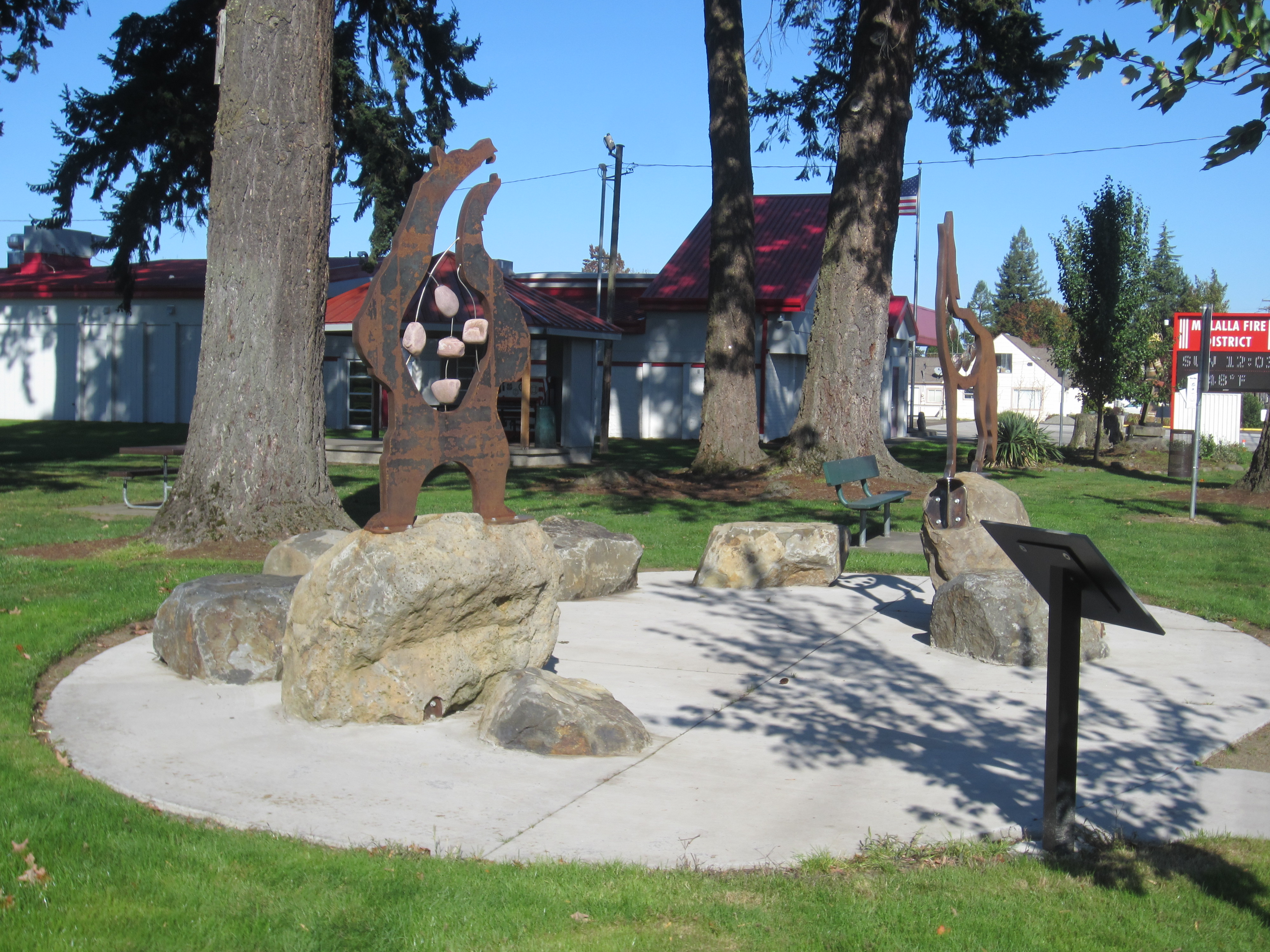

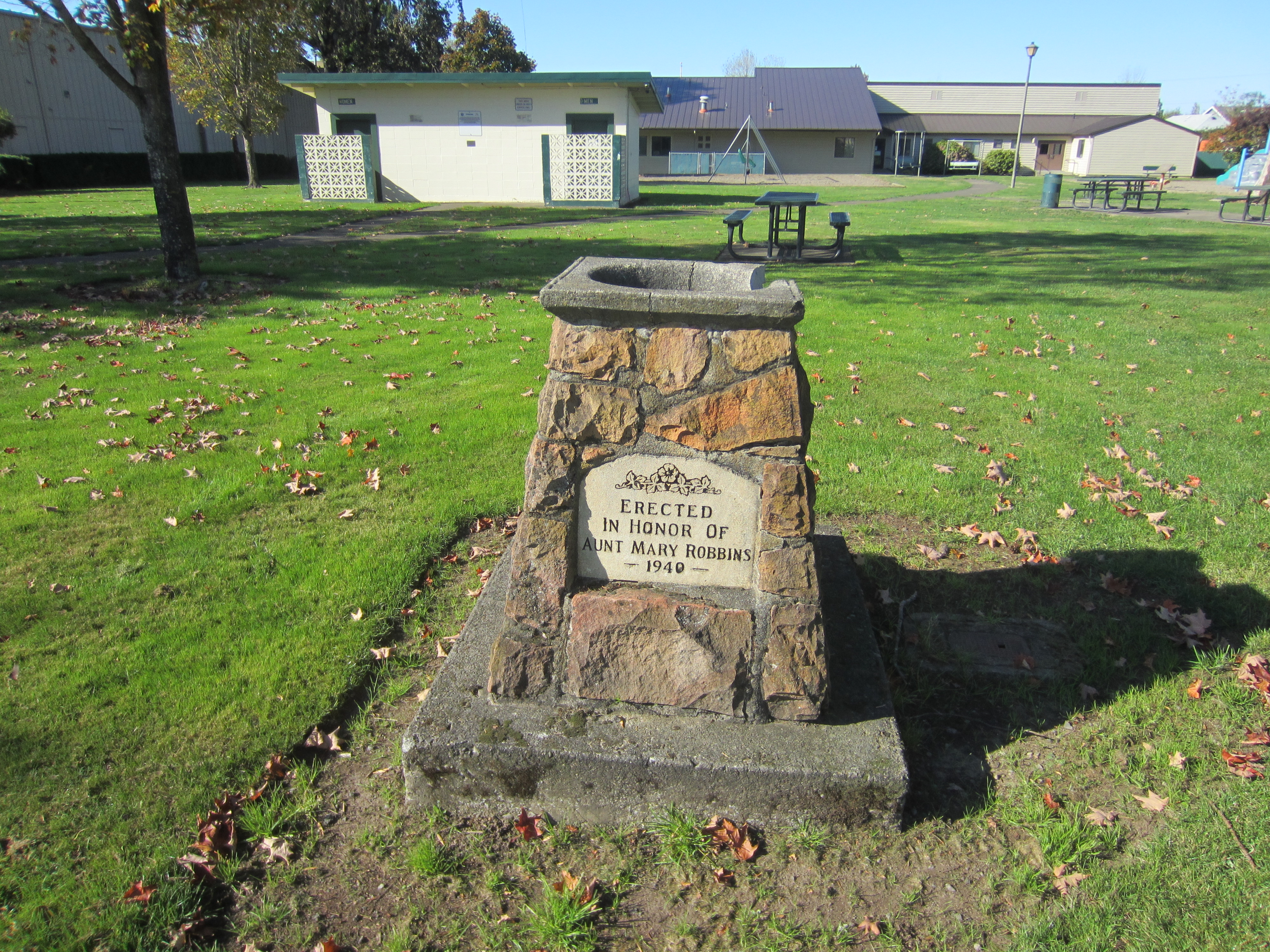

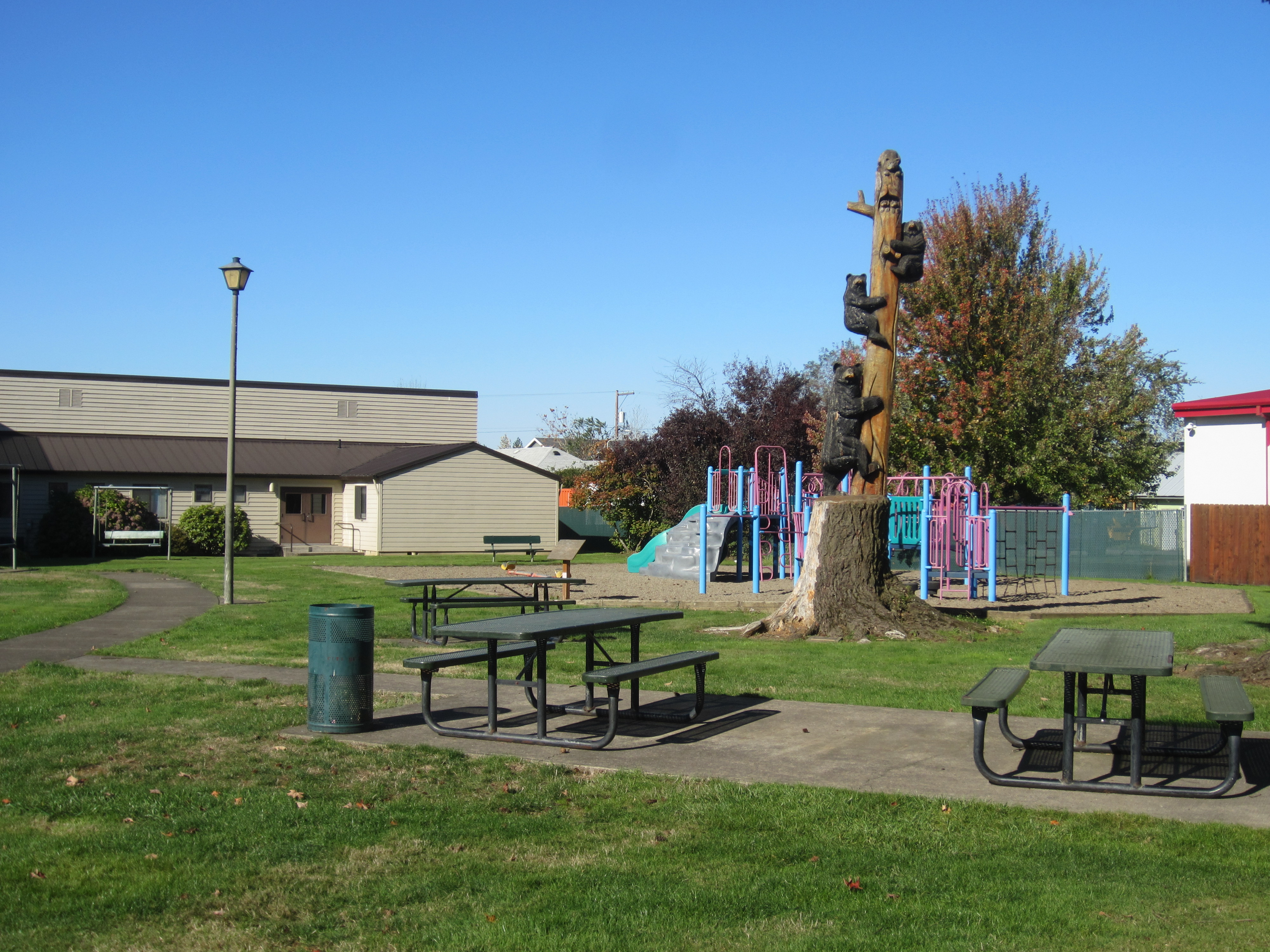
