= Molalla Buckeroo =

Coordinates: 45.151102°N 122.562527°W

Molalla Buckeroo Rodeo
- Locations: Molalla, Oregon
- Country: United States

The Molalla Buckeroo Rodeo is an annual rodeo in Molalla, Oregon, United States. It is held on Independence Day, July 4.

== History ==
The Molalla Buckeroo has been held annually since September 1913, when the railroad came to town. During the early years, the local firemen sponsored the rodeo as an equipment fundraiser. In 1923, the Molalla Buckeroo Association was formed and took over the operation of the Rodeo.

No Buckeroo was held in 1917–18, 1942–45 nor 2020.

=== Mission ===
1. Support community charitable programs, organizations, and causes
2. Support and promote a family-oriented community event
3. Preserve the oldest form of American Heritage, the rodeo
4. Promote tourism and development in Clackamas County

=== Logo ===
The Molalla Buckeroo began work to re-design their logo in early 2006.

== Organization ==
Currently the Molalla Buckeroo Rodeo Association, a nonprofit corporation, has over 60 active members who are all volunteers. These volunteers provide the management, production, and labor to ensure the continued success of the annual Buckeroo event, as well as helping with other events throughout the year. The Molalla Buckeroo Association is a major part of the Molalla community.

The main structure of the Molalla Buckeroo Association is made up of a Board of Directors. The Board of Directors, under the association's bylaws allow up to 50 directors. There is also Honorary members, who have been elected to Honorary status by the Board of Directors. Honorary members are previous regular directors that can still be active or inactive in the Association. Like Directors, Honorary Directors can vote on decisions made by the Board of Directors. Associate Members are members who have been accepted into the association by the Executive Committee. After at least one year, an associate member can be voted into the Association as a Director by the Board of Directors when positions open up.

The Buckeroo has a seven-member executive committee that is responsible for managing the extensive and varied committee structure of this organization. The Executive committee members are elected to the committee by the Board of Directors.

As a member of the Professional Rodeo Cowboys Association (PRCA), the Molalla Buckeroo Association puts on one of the largest rodeos in the Pacific Northwest and of the Columbia River Circuit of the PRCA. The Molalla Buckeroo was named Columbia River Circuit Rodeo of the Year in 2005.

In addition to the annual PRCA rodeo, the Molalla Buckeroo Association also hosts several Willamette Valley Junior Rodeo Association events, and BRN 4D barrel racing.

== Events ==
There are seven events that are held at the Molalla Buckeroo Rodeo:

- Bareback riding
- Calf roping
- Steer wrestling
- Saddle bronc riding
- Team roping
- Barrel racing
- Bull riding
