= Fred Vonder Ahe House =

- Fred Vonder Ahe House and Summer Kitchen
- U.S. National Register of Historic Places
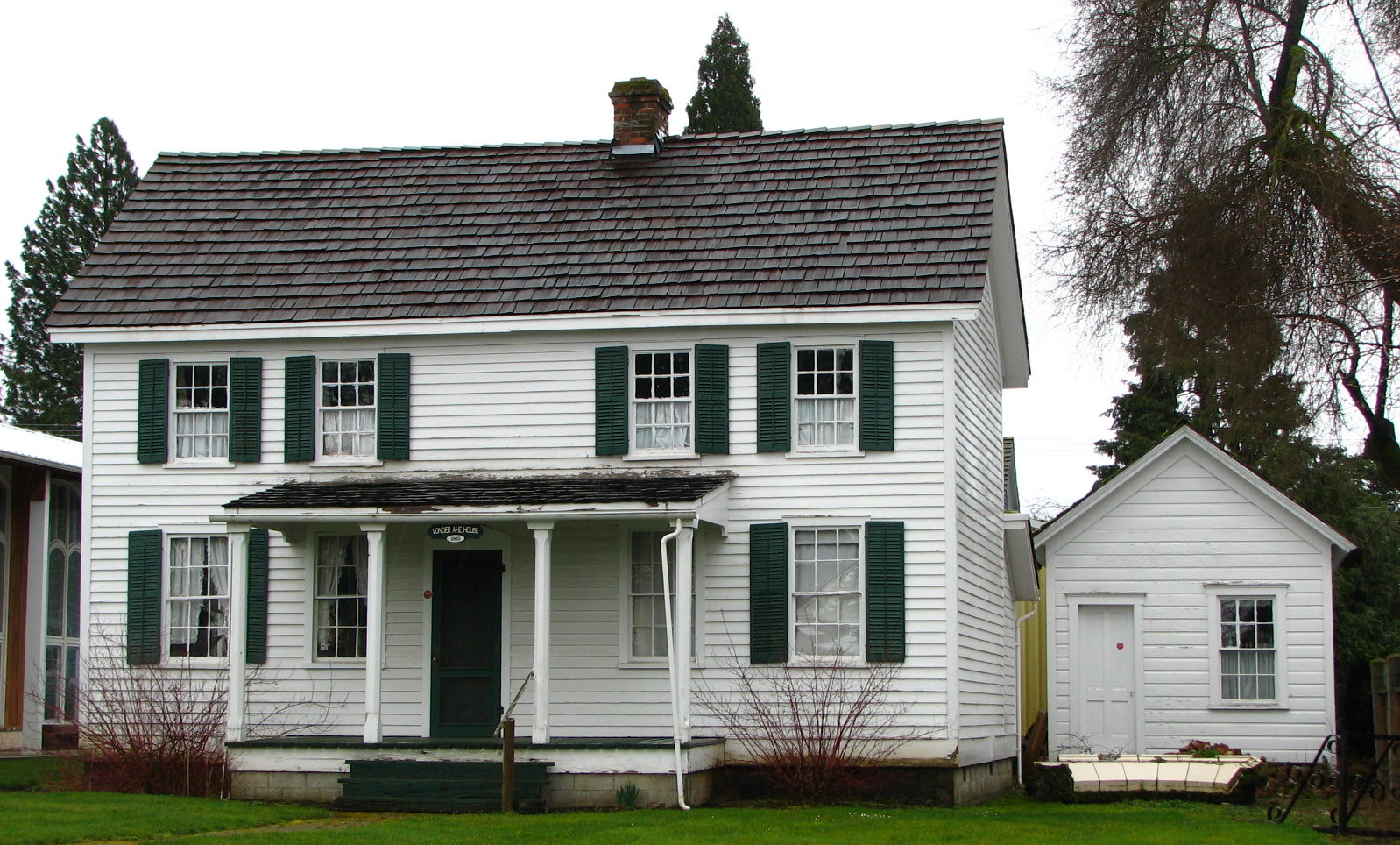

- Location within Oregon Location within the United States
- Location: 625 Metzler Ave., Molalla, Oregon
- Coordinates: 45°8′34″N 122°34′45″W
- Area: 0.3 acres (0.12 ha)
- Built: 1868
- Architectural style: Federal, Vernacular Federal
- NRHP reference No.: 76001580
- Added to NRHP: March 26, 1976

The Fred Vonder Ahe House or Von der Ahe House was built in 1869 in the small community of Carus, Oregon, near Molalla for German immigrant Fred Vonder Ahe and his wife Marie Louisa Kleine Vonder Ahe. Fred arrived in New York in 1852 and followed the Oregon Trail to Oregon. He saved enough to acquire a 320-acre (130 ha) farm in 1857, and sent for his fiancé Marie to join him in 1858. In 1887 the house became the Carus post office, as it was the oldest and most significant house in the community. In 1972 the house was under threat of demolition. It was acquired by the Molalla Area Historical Society and moved to a site in Molalla next to the Horace L. Dibble House.

The Vonder Ahe House is described as a vernacular interpretation of the Federal style. It is an unusual example of a two-story plank house with well-preserved interior details. The associated summer house was moved with the main house to the new site. The house and summer kitchen were placed on the National Register of Historic Places on March 26, 1976. Both the Vonder Ahe House and the Dibble House are operated as a museum by the Molalla Area Historical Society.
