= R. S. Hamilton =

Politician

Ralph S. Hamilton

33rd Speaker of the Oregon House of Representatives
- In office 1929–1930
- Preceded by: John H. Carkin
- Succeeded by: Frank J. Lonergan

Member of the Oregon House of Representatives from the 21st district
- In office 1925–1932
- Preceded by: H. J. Overturf
- Succeeded by: Warner B. Snider

Personal details
- Born: December 6, 1879 East Palestine, Ohio
- Died: May 30, 1960 (aged 80) Bend, Oregon
- Party: Republican
- Profession: Attorney and judge

Ralph Scott Hamilton (1879–1960) was a Republican politician from the U.S. state of Oregon, was the Speaker of the Oregon House of Representatives for its 1929 regular session.

== Early life and career ==
Hamilton was born on 6 December 1879 in East Palestine, Ohio. He was the son of Cyrus and Ida (Long) Hamilton. Hamilton attended Danville Military Institute in Virginia for several years. He then went on to the University of Missouri, where he was a top student and a star baseball player. He received a law degree from university in 1905 and admitted to the Missouri bar that same year.

He moved to Lind, Washington and was admitted to the Washington state bar in 1906. In 1908, he married his college sweetheart, Virginia Yancey. In 1911, the Hamiltons moved to Eugene, Oregon. He passed the Oregon bar examination and began law practice law in Eugene that same year. Hamilton also taught at the University of Oregon Law School from 1916 to 1918.

== State representative ==
In 1918, Hamilton moved to Bend, Oregon and opened a law practice there. He was elected to the Oregon House of Representatives in 1924, representing a very large rural district that included Crook, Deschutes, Jefferson, Klamath, and Lake counties. He served in that body from 1925 through 1932. During the 1929 legislative session, Hamilton was elected Speaker of the House. He also served as acting Governor of Oregon for a short period in 1930. During this period, Hamilton was also active in the local Chamber of Commerce, serving as president of the Bend Chamber of Commerce for several years.

== Attorney and judge ==
In 1930, Hamilton moved from Bend to Portland, Oregon. He practiced law in Portland for eight years. He also served as president of the Oregon State Chamber of Commerce from 1929 to 1932, and was president of the Portland Chamber of Commerce from 1935 through 1936.

Hamilton returned to Bend in 1939. He served as the legal advisor to Governor Charles A. Sprague during 1941 legislative session. Later that year, Sprague appointed him as the state judge in Oregon's 18th Judicial District after the death of Judge T. E. J. Duffy. Hamilton's judicial district encompassed Crook, Deschutes, and Jefferson counties. After his appointment, Hamilton was elected to three six year terms, serving a total of 18 years before retiring from the post in 1959. During his tenure as judge, he also served as president of the Association of Circuit Judges for Oregon from 1946 to 1950.

Died of heart failure in Bend on 30 May 1960.
