= Carus, Oregon =

Unincorporated community in the state of Oregon, United States

- Unincorporated community
- Location within Oregon
- Coordinates: 45°16′16″N 122°34′14″W
- Country: United States
- State: Oregon
- County: Clackamas
- Elevation: 509 ft (155 m)
- Time zone: UTC-8 (Pacific (PST))
  - Summer (DST): UTC-7 (PDT)
- ZIP code: 97045
- GNIS feature ID: 1118639

Carus is an unincorporated community in Clackamas County, Oregon, United States. It is located about seven miles south of Oregon City, on Oregon Route 213.

Carus had a post office from 1887 to 1907. The name may have come from a misreading of the name "Carns" on the application to the Post Office Department. It is unknown whether it was to be named for a place in another state or for a local family. The Fred Vonder Ahe House, now located in Molalla, served as the post office when it first opened. David Hunter was the first postmaster.

In 1915 the community had two sawmills, a daily stagecoach to Oregon City and a twice-daily stagecoach to Canby. As of 1990 there was a school and a church. Carus Elementary School is part of the Canby School District. A cemetery near the community is owned by the Followers of Christ.
