= Country Christian School =

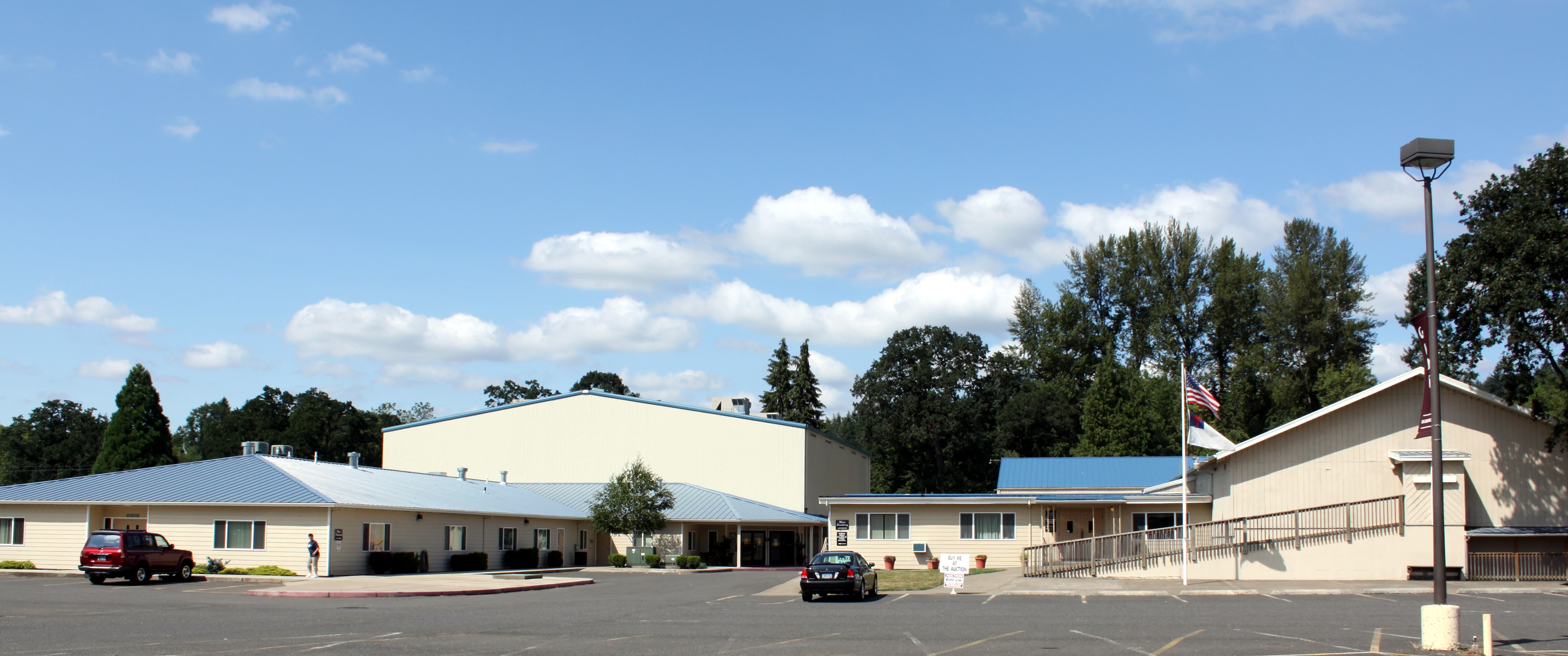

Location
- 16975 S Highway 211; Molalla, Clackamas County, Oregon 97038; United States; 45.171836°N 122.517973°W

Information
- Type: Private
- Principal: Kelly Merrill
- Grades: Pre K-12
- Enrollment: 275
- Colors: Navy blue and gold
- Athletics conference: OSAA The Valley 10 League 1A-1
- Mascot: Cougars
- Accreditation: NAAS
- Affiliation: Christian
- Website: CCS website

Country Christian School, known as CCS, is a private Christian school in Molalla, Oregon, United States. It has been accredited through the Northwest Association of Accredited Schools since 1991.
