= Edward Schulmerich House =

Historic house in Oregon, United States

- U.S. National Register of Historic Places
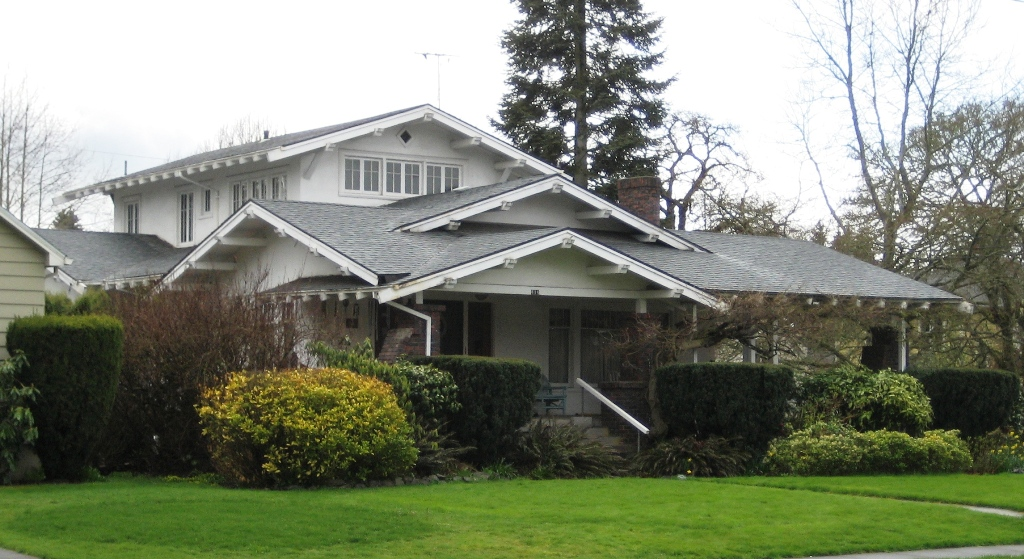
- North side of home

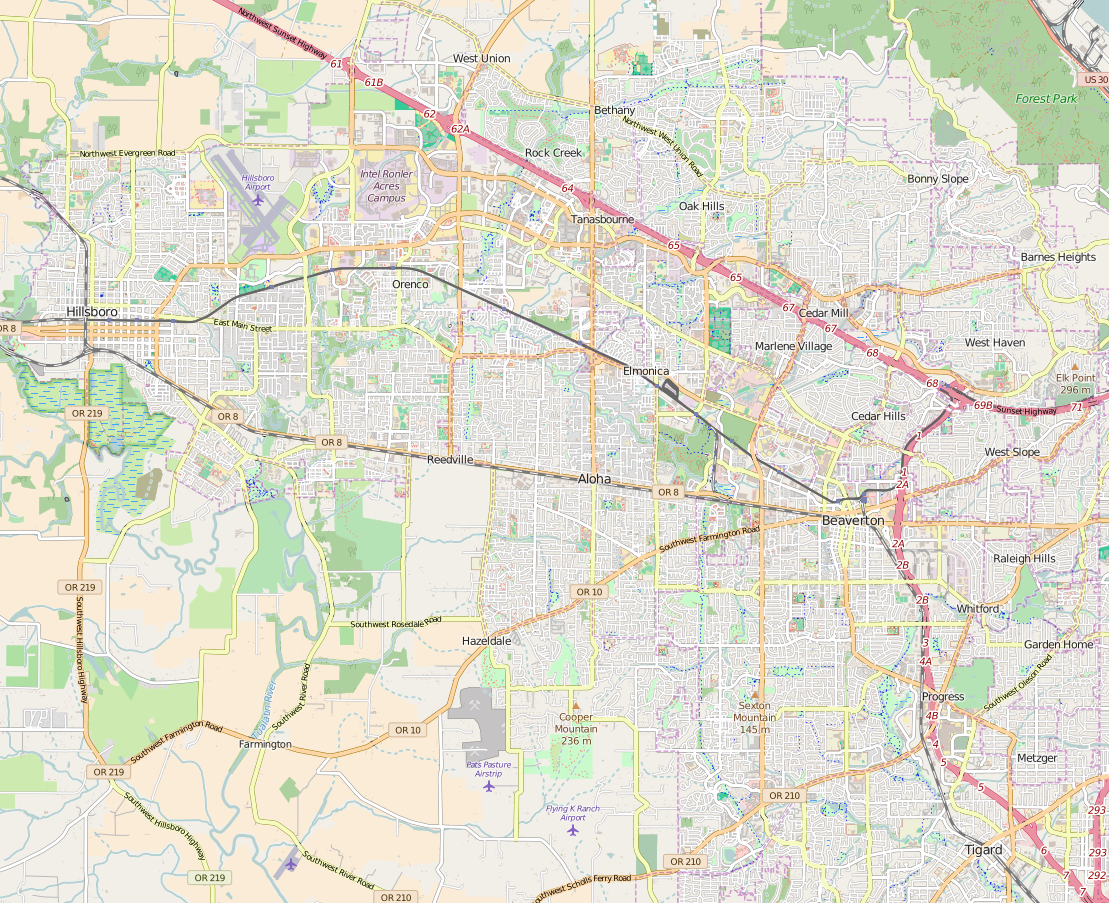
- Location within the United States Location within Oregon Location within Hillsboro Beaverton OR
- Location: Hillsboro, Oregon, USA
- Coordinates: 45°31′20″N 122°58′49″W
- Built: 1915
- Architectural style: American Craftsman Bungalow
- Visitation: 75 (2005)
- NRHP reference No.: 91000050
- Added to NRHP: February 28, 1991

The Edward Schulmerich House is a two-story private residence on East Main Street in downtown Hillsboro, Oregon, United States. Completed in 1915, the American Craftsman Bungalow style structure was constructed for state senator Edward Schulmerich and added to the National Register of Historic Places in 1991. The building retains much of the original materials used in finishing the interior, including the linoleum in the kitchen and built-in cabinets of this Airplane Bungalow.

== History ==
Edward Schulmerich was born in 1863 and moved to Oregon with his family in 1869. In 1906, he helped to found the Hillsboro Commercial Bank and later became the president of the bank. Schulmerich built a new two-story bank building in 1911 at Second and Main streets. The later merchant and member of the Oregon Legislative Assembly, had a new residence built in 1915 on Main Street at Sixth Avenue on the large corner property.

He had traveled to Pasadena, California, that year and discovered the arts and crafts style bungalows built there and returned with plans for a house in that style. Schulmerich died in 1937, and in 1967 Joan Krahmer purchased the house from a Mr. Mays. On February 28, 1991, the structure was added to the National Register of Historic Places. In 2003, the residence was featured in the magazine American Bungalow. As of 2005, Krahmer, a columnist for The Hillsboro Argus and former teacher at Hillsboro High School, still owned the property that retained original elements that included the linoleum and cabinets in the kitchen, bookcases on the second floor, many lighting fixtures, and sugar and flour bins.

== Details ==
Designed in the Airplane Bungalow style of residence, the design is meant to resemble an airplane with its smaller second story that provides a 360 degree view much like a cockpit. Other features that mimic aircraft are overhanging eaves and a low angle roof that combined resemble the wings of an airplane. The design exhibits the excitement generated by the early years of airplanes.

Inside, the building has an open floor plan and comprises 4,000 square-feet. Prominently featured is a large, arched brick fireplace with a mantle of green tiles. Also inside are oak paneling in the dining room, a built-in ironing station, lead glass windows, boxed beams, a cooling closet, built-in bookcases, a lift from the basement for firewood, and wainscoting. The built in cabinets and flooring were made from quartersawn oak. These cabinets include doors with leaded glass. Two bedrooms are located on the second floor, designed for ventilation during the warmer months and lined with a total of 34 windows.

On the outside of the home is a wraparound porch protected by the roof which includes overlapping gabled dormers. There are large, L-shaped brick piers on the porch which, along with the chimneys, was built using clinker bricks. These cast-off bricks were also used to build the large brick foundation. Landscaping features purple wisteria that hangs on the porch. Wood and stucco make up the siding on the exterior.

== See also ==
- National Register of Historic Places listings in Washington County, Oregon
