= Macy Morse =

American activist (1921–2019)

- Born: January 25, 1921; Molalla, Oregon, U.S.
- Died: July 18, 2019 (aged 98)
- Other name: Macy Elaine Elkins
- Education: Oregon College of Education
- Spouse: Paul Morse
- Children: 13

Macy Morse (January 25, 1921 – July 18, 2019) was an American activist in the non-violent peace and anti-nuclear movements. She died in July 2019 at the age of 98.

== History and background ==
Macy Elkins was born in Molalla, Oregon, a Pacific Northwest logging town. She was the great-great-granddaughter of Oregon Trail pioneer Luther Elkins.

Morse, along with others, formed the Nashua, New Hampshire People Concerned About the War in Vietnam to help end United States involvement in the Vietnam War.

Morse was a participant of Avco Plowshares, an action group of the Plowshares Movement. The group was set up to target Avco Corporation, a military contractor and subsidiary of Textron. The group entered the Avco Systems Division in Wilmington, Massachusetts and hammered on manufacturing equipment and poured blood on documents entitled "MX-Peacekeeper". She served eight days in jail.

In 1981, to protest the Reagan Administration's nuclear first strike policies, Morse made her way into the offices of Reagan's press secretary Alexander Haig, where she splashed human blood onto the carpet and furniture. Morse was arrested and sentenced to 18 days in jail.

== See also ==
- Clamshell Alliance
- List of anti-nuclear protests in the United States
