= Horace L. Dibble House =

- Horace L Dibble House
- U.S. National Register of Historic Places
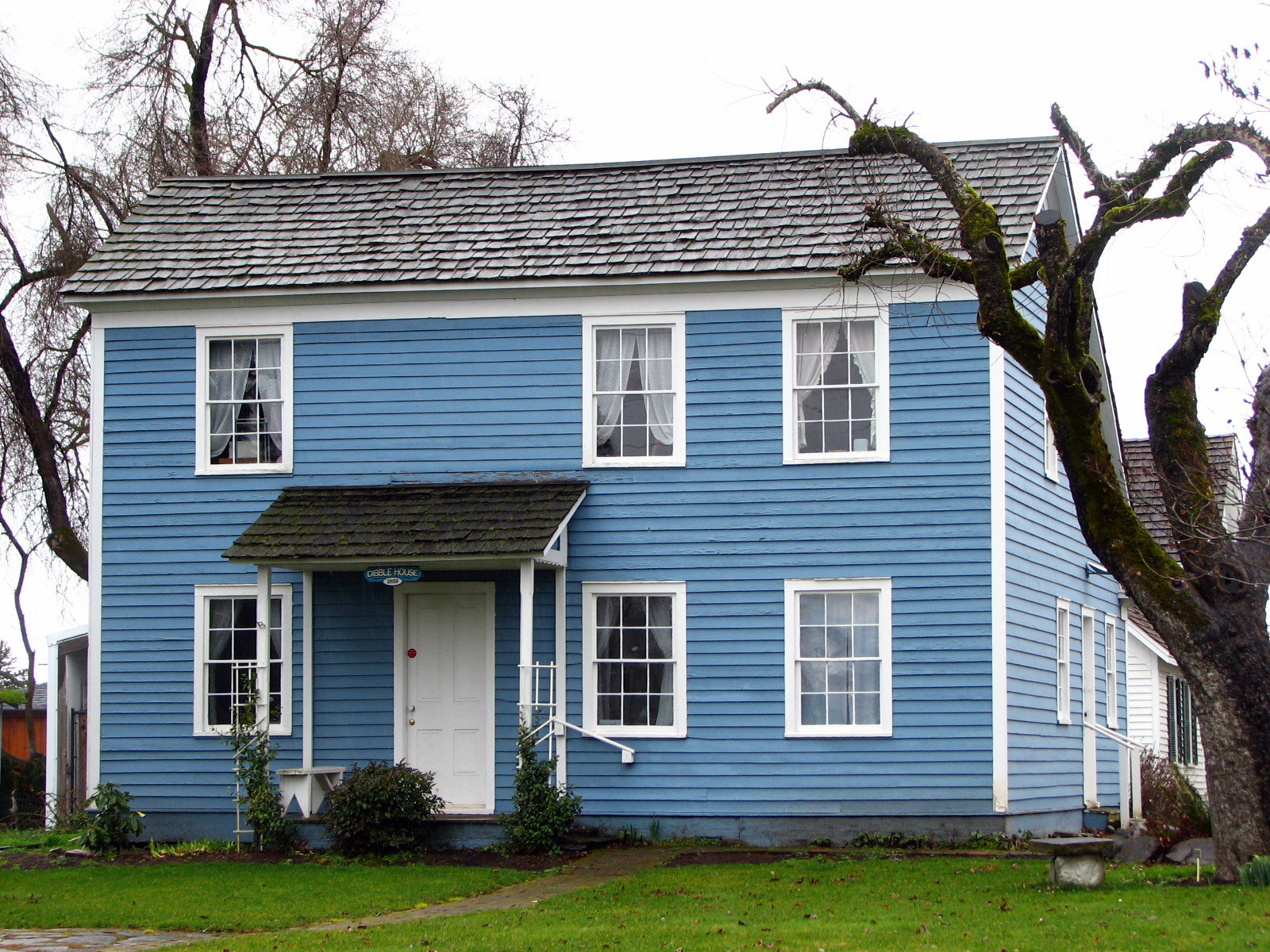

- Location within Oregon Location within the United States
- Location: 620 S. Molalla Ave., Molalla, Oregon
- Coordinates: 45°8′33″N 122°34′43″W
- Area: 0.3 acres (0.12 ha)
- Built: 1856
- Architectural style: Salt box
- NRHP reference No.: 74001675
- Added to NRHP: December 19, 1974

The Horace L Dibble House was built circa 1859 in Molalla, Oregon for Horace Lasalle Dibble and his family. The house is unusual as a western example of a saltbox, a dwelling type more commonly associated with Colonial-era New England. The timber-framed house has two stories on the eastern main facade, and one story in the rear. It is unusual for a Settlement Era house to have such large rooms, large windows, and two fireplaces.

Dibble was born in Madison County, New York in 1815 to Thomas and Ruth Gates Dibble. He married his wife Julia Ann Sturges in Van Buren County, Iowa in July 1845. In 1852, Horace, Julia, their three children, along with members of the Sturges family, traveled overland to Oregon and settled in the Needy area of the Willamette Valley. While riding out looking for lost cattle, Horace came upon a knoll covered with apple trees not far from the four corners of what is now Molalla. He decided that this is where he wanted to live out his life, and arranged to purchase the land belonging to the widow Rachel Larkins. He hired a local builder who was a former seafarer, who took three years to build the house. The Dibbles and their then 6 children moved into their new home in 1859. Two more children were born to them in the house. The family lived in the home until 1909. Horace died in 1899, a man noted for his thrift. Julia died in 1904, and was a loving mother, a kind friend, and as long as she was physically able, was very ready to extend a helping hand to the sick and needy.

In 1909 the house was rented and then sold to Dudley and Goldie Boyles. They lived in the house only until 1914, when Dudley was elected Clackamas County Recorder, and they moved to Oregon City. In 1930 Dudley lost his life in an automobile accident, leaving Goldie with two daughters to raise. She maintained ownership of the house, renting it out, until she was finally able to return to Molalla and live in the house until her death in 1968. Her heirs then sold the house to Ruth McBride (Mrs Albert) Powers, who did some immediate restoration work and arranged for the house to be purchased by the Molalla Area Historical Society. The historical society was incorporated in January 1970 for the purpose of restoring the Dibble house and using it as a museum.

The Dibble House was placed on the National Register of Historic Places on December 19, 1974. The Dibble House is operated as a museum by the Molalla Area Historical Society, together with the Fred Vonder Ahe House and Ivor Davies Hall. The museum is open for tours on Fridays and Saturdays from 1-4 PM from May through October, and by appointment.

Details

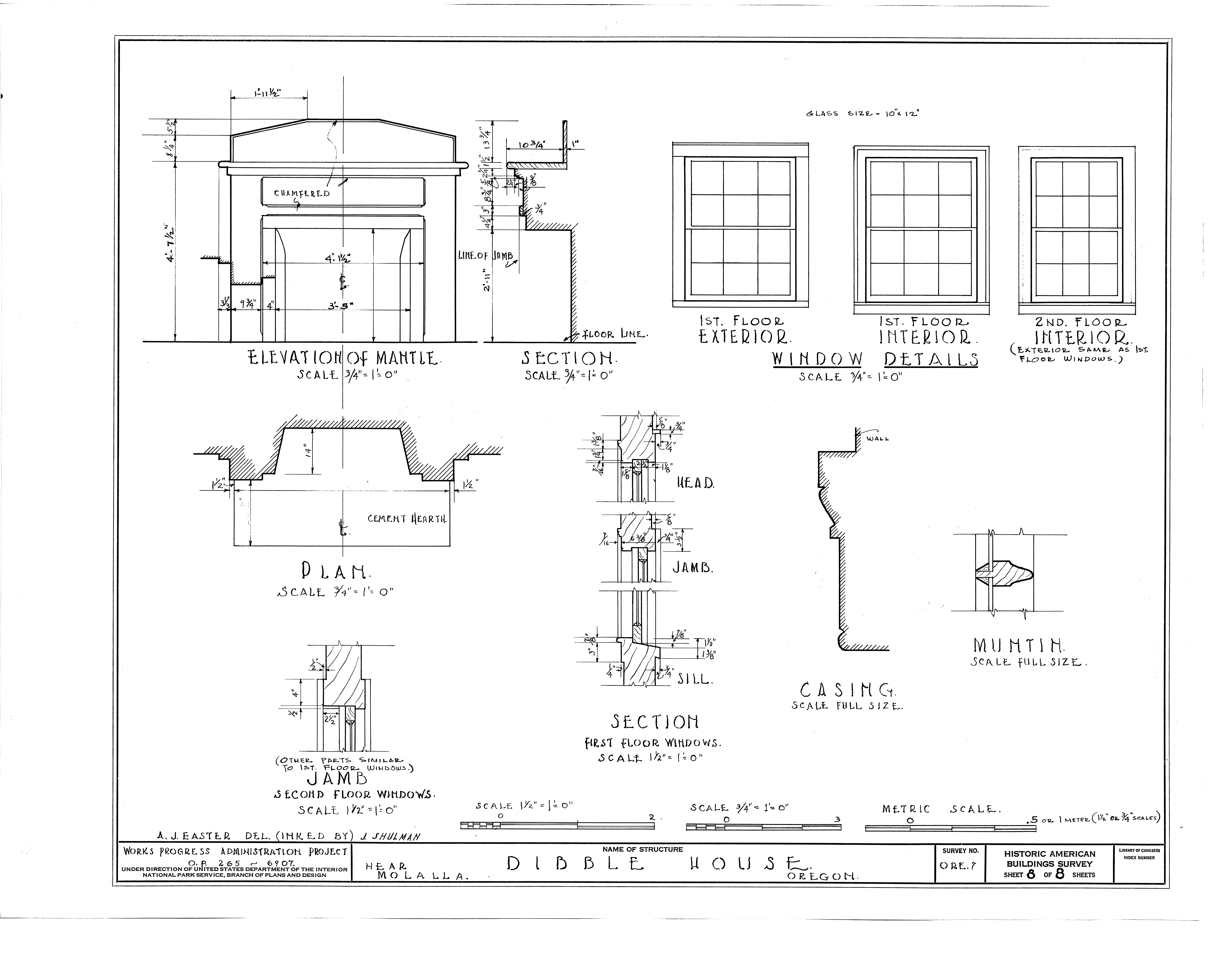
Details
