= Fox Park (Molalla, Oregon) =

Public park

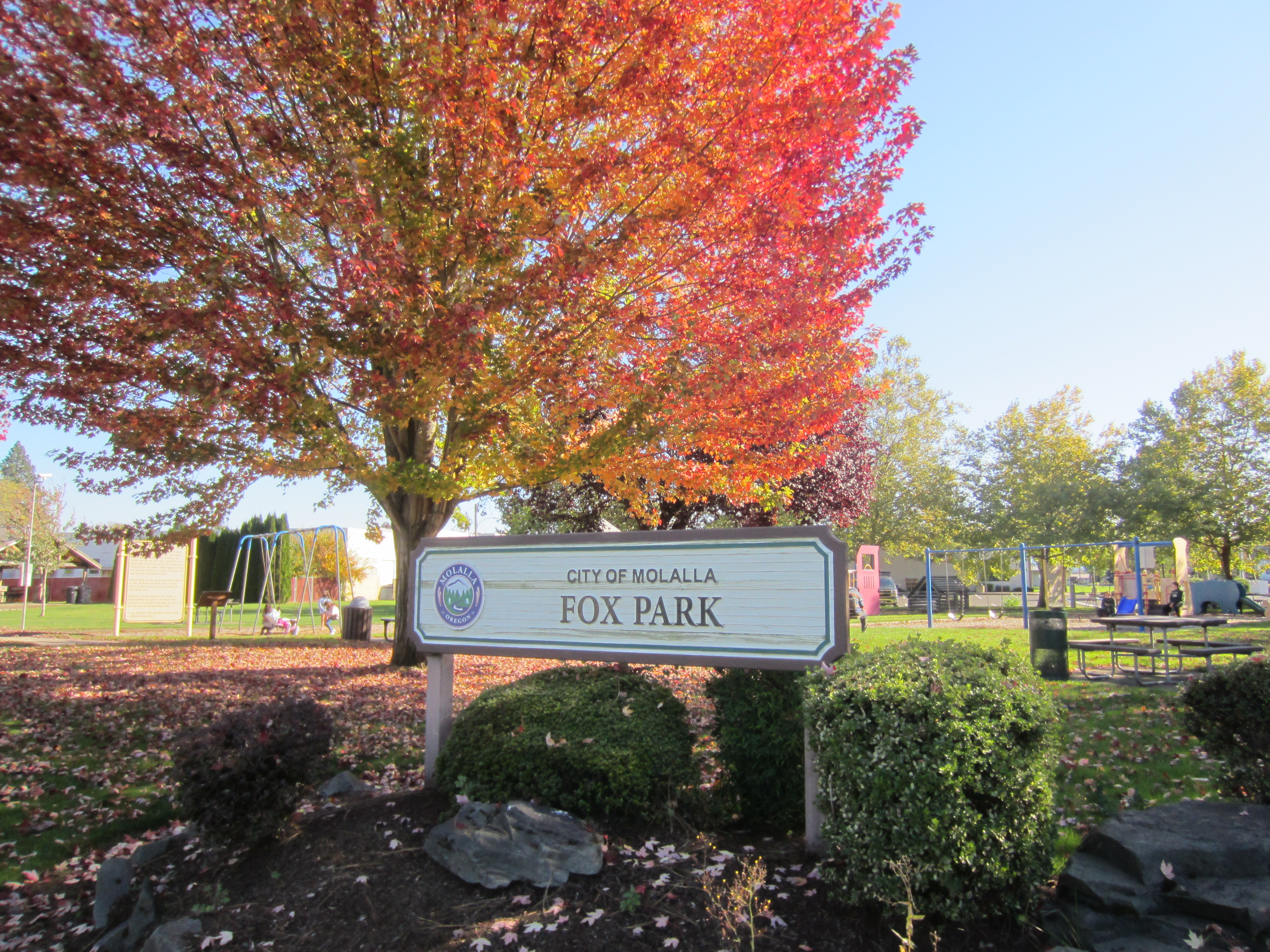
- Park signage, 2020

- Location within Oregon
- Location: 201 E. 5th Street, Molalla, Oregon, U.S.
- Coordinates: 45°08′41″N 122°34′41″W

Fox Park (officially Sally Fox Park) is a 2.3-acre (0.93 ha) public park in Molalla, Oregon, United States.

== Features ==
Fox Park features a playground, splash pad, basketball area, and restrooms. A gazebo was built in the park in 2011; the structure cost $25,000 and was funded in part by the Ford Family Foundation.

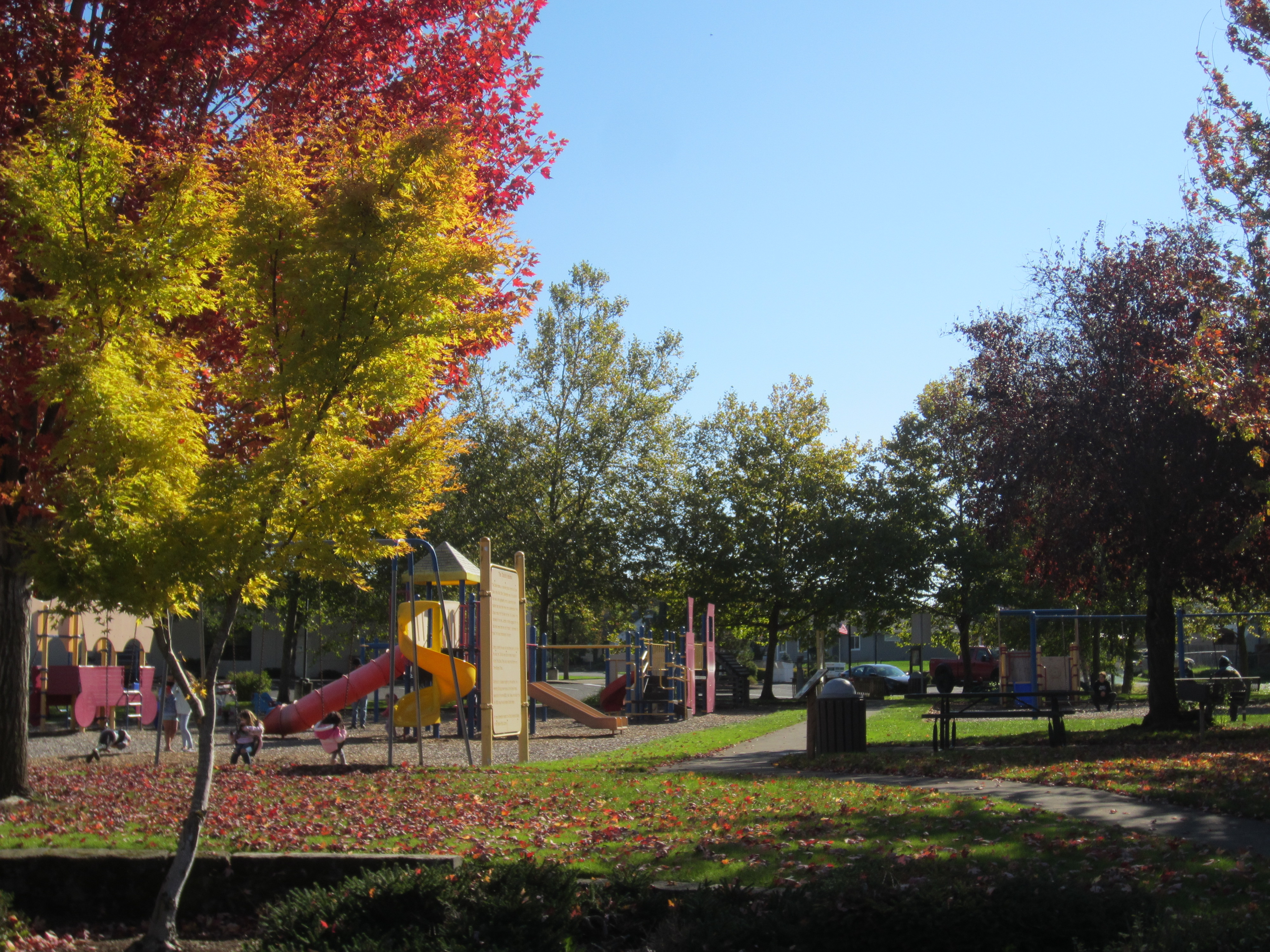
Playground

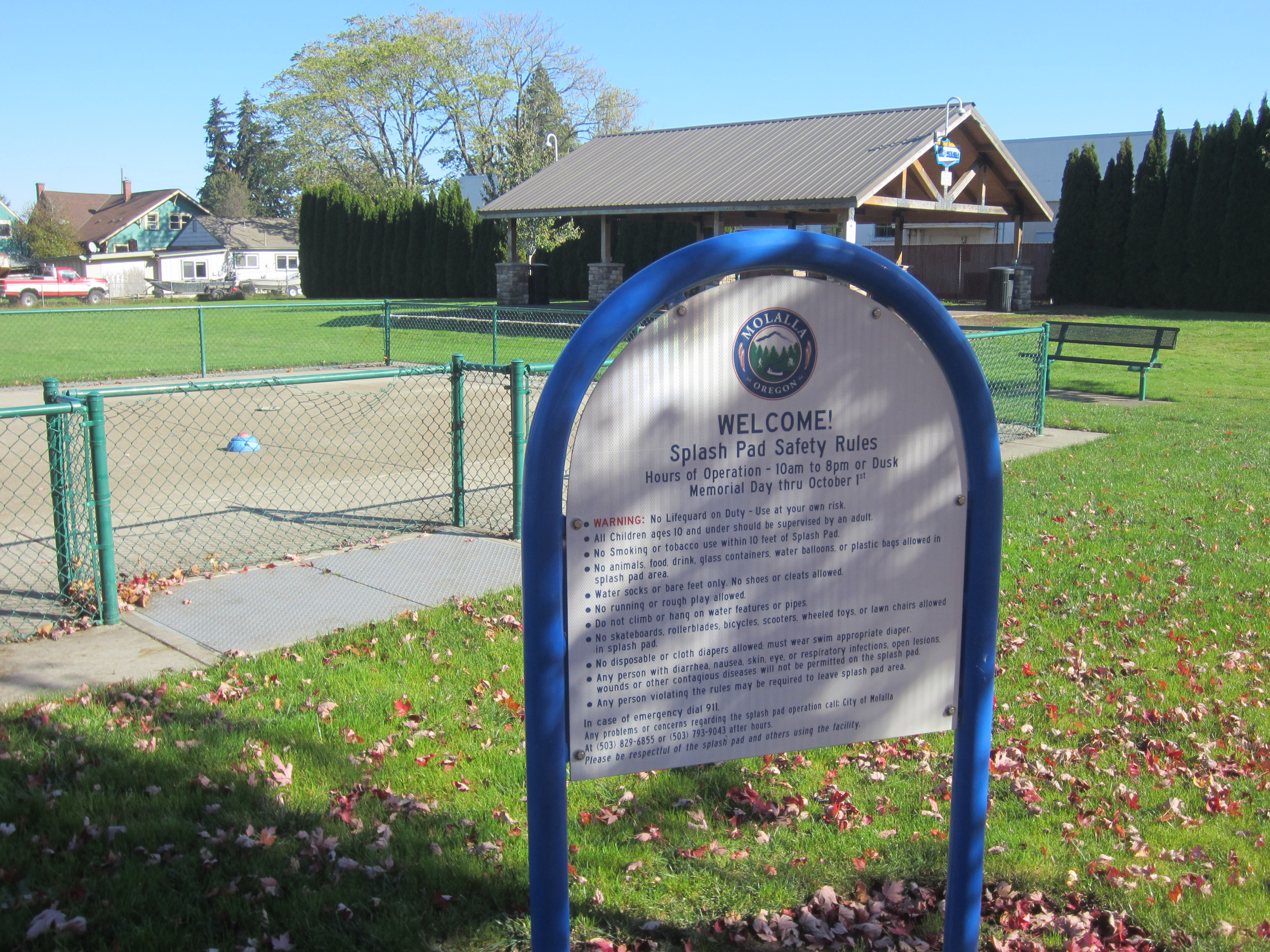
Splash pad

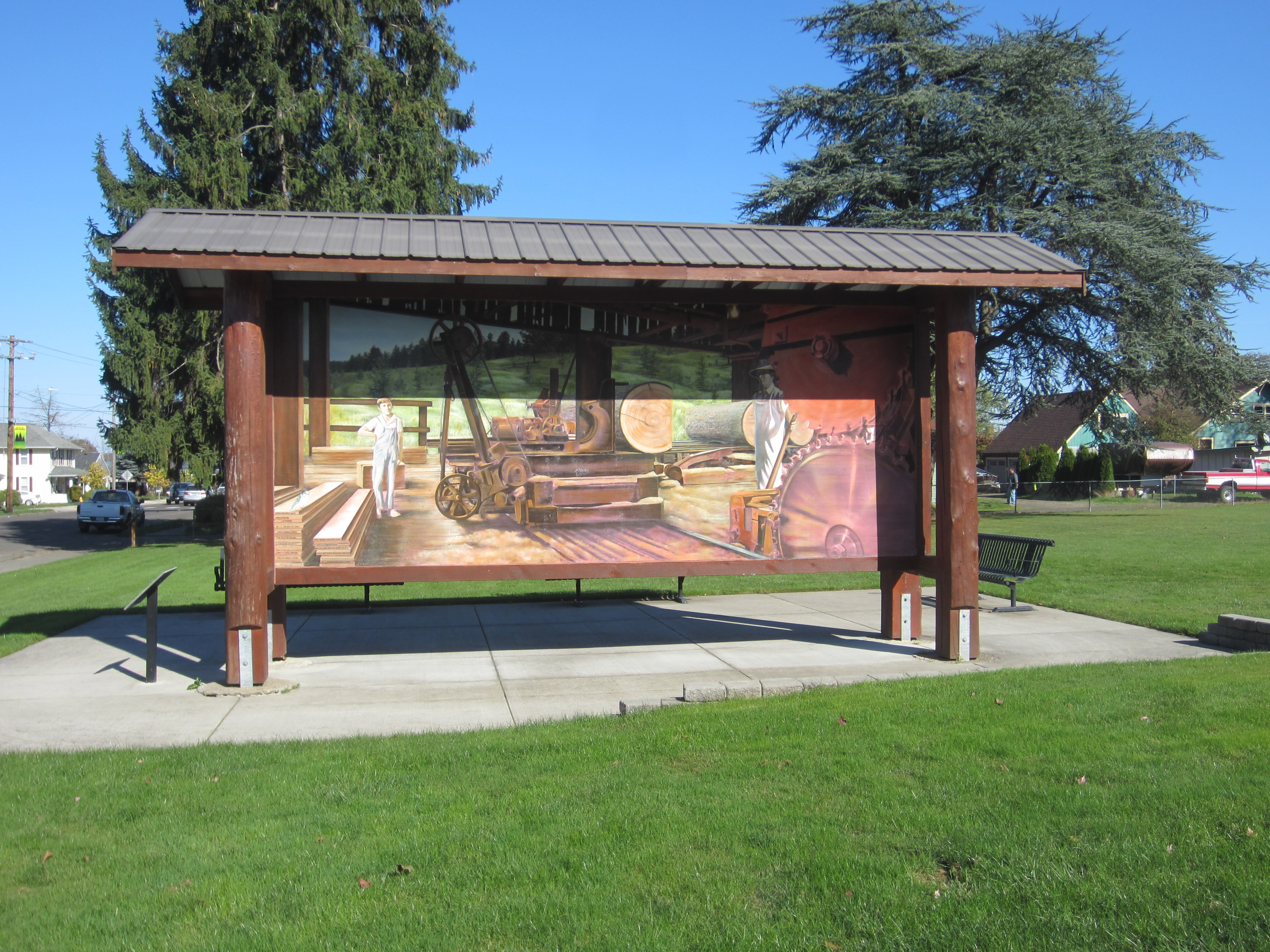
Mural

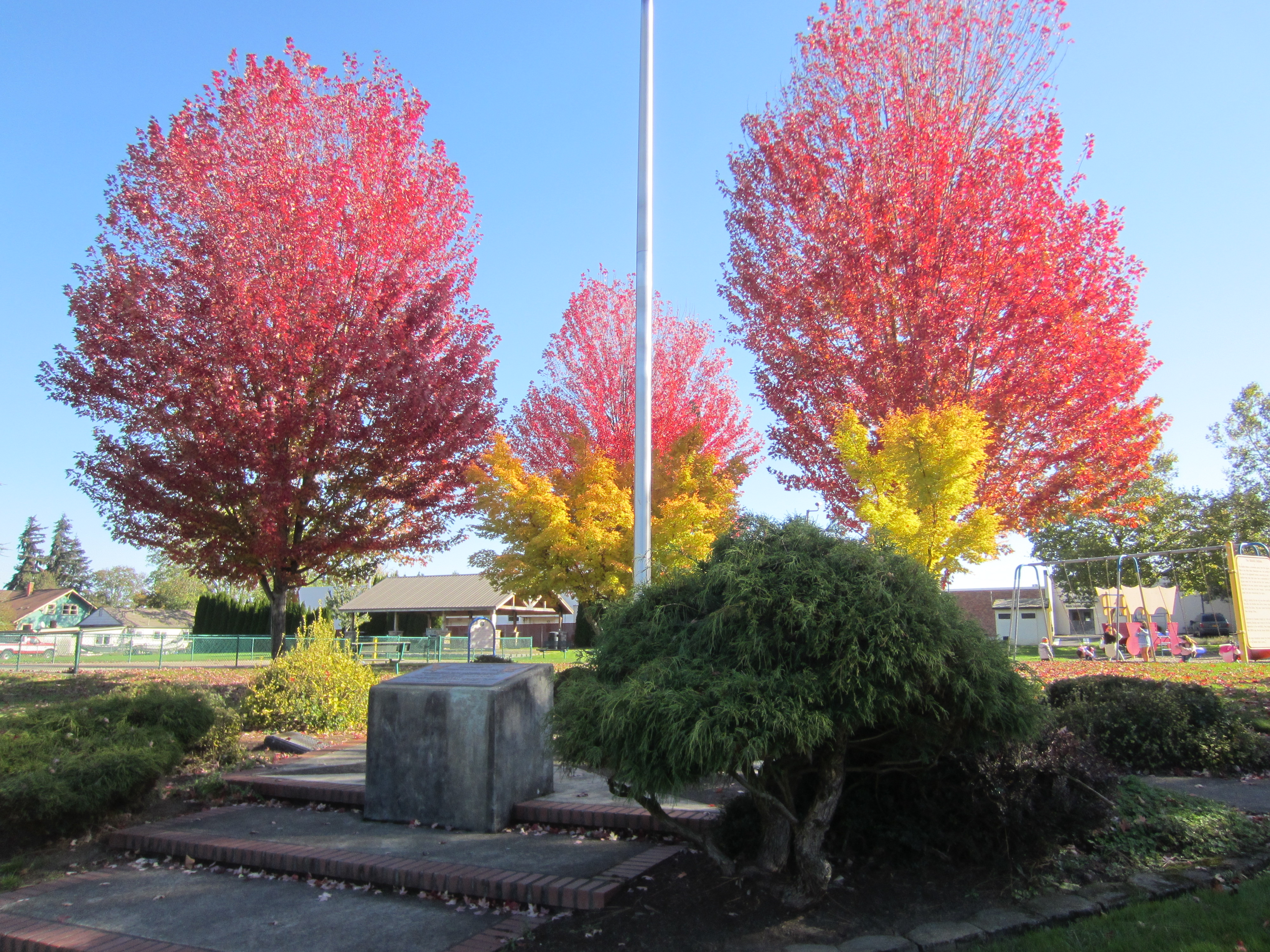
War memorial

== History ==
Fox Park hosted National Night Out in 2013. Approximately 1,000 people gathered in the park to attend a viewing party for the solar eclipse of August 21, 2017, hosted by the Molalla Public Library.
