= John H. Carkin =

American politician and attorney

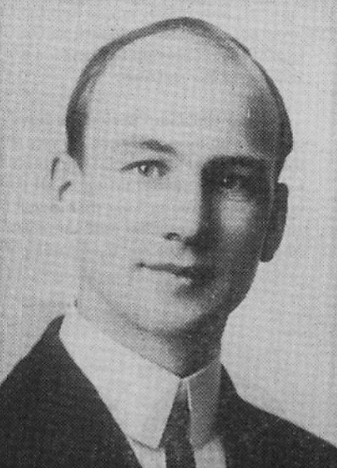
- Oregon state legislator John Carkin, 1923

32nd Speaker of the Oregon House of Representatives
- In office 1927–1928
- Preceded by: Denton G. Burdick
- Succeeded by: Ralph S. Hamilton

Member of the Oregon House of Representatives from the 8th district
- In office 1923-1929
- Preceded by: Benjamin C. Shelton
- Succeeded by: Earl B. Day
- In office 1913–1914
- Preceded by: M. F. Eggleston
- Succeeded by: Marian B. Towne

Personal details
- Born: November 18, 1883 Bangor, Maine, US
- Died: January 24, 1971 (aged 87) Salem, Oregon, US
- Party: Republican
- Spouse: Vida May Turner
- Profession: Attorney, public service executive, and banker

John Herbert Carkin (November 18, 1883 – January 24, 1971) was an American politician, attorney, public service executive, and banker from the state of Oregon. He was a Republican who served nine years in the Oregon House of Representatives, where he represented a district in southern Oregon. He served as Speaker of the Oregon House of Representatives during the 1927 legislative session, elected by a unanimous vote of House members. Later, he served as chairman of the Oregon Tax Commission and was Oregon's Public Utility Commissioner before becoming president of a savings and loan association in Salem, Oregon.

== Early life ==
Carkin was born in Bangor, Maine, on November 18, 1883, the son of Ebenezer W. L. Carkin and Ada Louise (York) Carkin. As a child, Carkin moved with his family to farm near Hillsboro, North Dakota, where he attended public schools.

Carkin went on to college at the University of Minnesota. He paid for his college by doing farm labor and selling newspapers. After graduating with a degree in business, he attended law school at the University of North Dakota, graduating in 1908. He moved to southern Oregon later that year, settling in Medford.

In 1910, Carkin married Vida May Turner in Grand Forks, North Dakota. After their marriage, Vida joined him in Medford. Over the years, they had five children together.

== Lawyer and businessman ==
The state of Oregon certified Carkin as a public notary in 1908. A year later, he was admitted to the Oregon State Bar and opened a law practice in Medford. Carkin practiced both corporate and criminal law in Medford for the next 20 years, first as a private attorney in partnership with F. J. Newman and then as Medford's city prosecutor from 1921 to 1929. He was also a founding member of the Jackson County Bar Association, which was organized in 1914.

In addition to his law practice, Carkin was a successful businessman. He was a founding member of the Medford Merchants Association and became the association's first secretary. He also helped create a number of new businesses in and around Medford. In 1909, Carkin became a founding partner of the Southern Oregon Building and Loan Association. The association opened its office-headquarters in Medford that same year. It was capitalized with $25,000. He was also a founding partner of the Medford and Butte Falls Telephone Company, another Medford-based start-up business. Carkin was elected secretary of the new telephone company. Later, he became a founding partner in the Gold Hills Railroad and Lumber Company.

Shortly after arriving in southern Oregon, Carkin bought a 99-acre (40 ha) irrigated farm with an established orchard near Central Point. He paid $15,000 for the property. He later became a member of the Oregon Farm Bureau and the Oregon Fruit Growers’ League.

In addition, Carkin was active in a number of civic and fraternal organizations. For example, he was a member of the Medford Lions Club and the local Elks lodge. He was also a Mason and a Shriner.

== State representative ==
In 1912, Carkin decided to run for a District 8 seat of the Oregon House of Representatives, representing Jackson County. Carkin and John A. Westerlund of Medford filed as Republicans while G. F. Barkdull and H. L. DeArmond, both from Medford, filed as Democrats. Because there were two seats in House District 8, each party was able to nominate two candidates in the primary election. Carkin and Westerlund were nominated by Jackson County's Republicans and Barkdull and DeArmond were nominated in Democratic primary. In the general election, Carkin and Westerlund won the two District 8 seats. While the two Democrats got more votes in Medford, Carkin and Westerlund did better in nearby Ashland and in the rural parts of Jackson County. Westerlund received the most votes, a total of 1,932; Carkin was second with 1,845 followed by Barkdull with 1,782 and DeArmond with 1,706 votes.

Carkin took his seat in the Oregon House on January 13, 1913, representing District 8. He served through the 1913 regular legislative session which ended on March 5. During the session, Carkin served on the powerful ways and means committee. He was also member of the counties and mining committees. He proved to be an effective legislator and was author of Oregon's first comprehensive budget law. He also introduced a bill to allow women to serve on all juries throughout the state.

In early 1914, Carkin expressed an interest in running for re-election and he was favored to retain his District 8 seat. However, he never filed the paperwork needed to get on the ballot. As a result, William P. Mealey of Medford and Fred D. Wagner of Ashland won the Republican nomination and went on to win the general election, replacing Carkin and Westerlund in the two District 8 seats.

== Law and public service ==
Having left the legislature at the end of 1914, Carkin returned to his law practice in Medford and his various Jackson County business interests. For the next several years, he was the senior partner in Carkin and Taylor, his Medford law firm. He also served on the Medford city council's finance committee from 1917 through 1920.

In 1917, Governor James Withycombe appointed Carkin to a seven-person committee to recommend options for streamlining Oregon's state government. The committee investigated opportunities for consolidating state offices, agencies, commissions, board, and committees. In 1919, the commission made 13 specific recommendations to streamline Oregon's government including establishing a lieutenant governor position, focusing the Secretary of State on the auditing function, and consolidating numerous state agencies, boards, and commissions.

== Return to the legislature ==
In 1922, Carkin decided to run for another two-year term in the Oregon House of Representatives. He filed to run for his old seat in House District 8, representing Jackson County as a Republican. In the Republican primary, Carkin and Ralph P. Cowgill were nominated for the two District 8 seats while O. H. Johnson and J. O. Rigg were nominated in the Democratic primary. Carkin and Cowgill won the District 8 seats in the general election.

Carkin took his seat in the Oregon House on January 8, 1923, representing Jackson County's District 8. He worked through the 1923 regular legislative session which ended on February 22. During the session, he was appointed chairman of the important legislation committee. He was also a member of the judiciary, road and highways, and joint rules committees.

In 1924, Carkin filed for re-election in House District 8. Carkin and fellow incumbent Ralph Cowgill won the Republican nominations for the two District 8 seats. E. H. Hurd was the only Democrat to file in District 8, so he was automatically advanced to the general election. Carkin and Cowgill were re-elected to their District 8 seats in the general election. Cowgill received 5,386 votes; Carkin was second with 4,690 while Hurd finished last with 3,078 votes.

Carkin took his seat in the Oregon House of Representatives on January 12, 1925, representing District 8. He worked through the 1925 regular legislative session which ended on February 26. During the session, he was appointed chairman of the legislation committee and also served as a member of the judiciary, resolutions, and joint rules committees.

== Speaker of the House ==
Carkin decided to run for re-election in 1926. He also began organizing support among his legislative peers for election to the House speaker position if re-elected to his District 8 seat. Carkin and William M. Briggs of Ashland filed for the two District 8 seats as Republicans. Because the Republican Party could nominate two candidates for the District 8 seats, they were automatically advanced to the general election.

After the Republican primary, Carkin formally announced his plan to seek the position of Speaker of the House. Within a few weeks, he had enough pledged votes from fellow Republican legislative candidates to ensure his election if his party retained control of the House, which was almost guaranteed since Republicans had outnumbered Democrats 57 to 3 in the previous legislative session.

Carkin and Briggs won the two District 8 seats in the general election. Carkin received 3,566 votes while Briggs got 3,355. The two Democrats ran well behind Carkin and Briggs. One Democrat, Glen Fabrick, got 2,418 votes and the other, J. R. Bowen, received 2,043. Within days of the general election newspapers reported that Carkin would be elected speaker, probably without opposition. Before the session began every member of the House was pledged to support Carkin for speaker.

The 1927 legislative session began on January 10. On the opening day, Carkin was unanimously elected speaker, with the four House Democrats voting for him. The next day, Carkin made the House committee appointments. Within ten days of the session's opening, all of the pending House bills had been assigned to the appropriate committees, and newspapers were commenting on the efficiency of House operations under Carkin's leadership. During the session, the legislature passed a complex state income tax bill which Carkin promoted by underscoring the opportunity it provided to reduce other taxes. The session lasted six weeks, closing on February 25.

== Last legislative term ==
After the success of the 1927 legislative session, newspapers began to speculate that Carkin might be a candidate for Secretary of State in the next election. He was also mentioned in connection with a possible run for governor or a seat in Congress. However, he decided to run for re-election to the state House of Representatives.

Carkin filed for re-election in House District 8. William Briggs, the other District 8 Republican incumbent, also filed for re-election. Two Democrats, L. A. Williamson and J. F. Wortman, also filed for the District 8 seats. Since each party could nominate two candidates, all four of the District 8 candidates were advanced to the general election. In the general election, Carkin and Briggs won the two House District 8 seats by a wide margin.

Carkin did not seek the speakership in the 1929 legislative session. That session opened on January 14. During the session, Carkin was appointed chairman of the taxation and revenue committee. He also served as a member of the judiciary, legislation, resolutions, and rules committees. The session finished its business on March 4.

== Public service and banking ==
After the close of the 1929 legislative session, Governor Isaac L. Patterson decided to appoint Carkin to the Oregon Tax Commission. To accommodate this new position, Carkin resigned from the legislature and moved with his wife from Medford to Salem. However, Oregon's attorney general, Isaac Van Winkle, ruled Carkin was ineligible for the position because he was a member of the legislature when the salary for the commission position was increased. To avoid that legal issue, the governor appointed Carkin to a different tax commission position that would not receive the pay adjustment until that position's current term expired. A year later, Carkin was re-appointed to a full four-year term on the tax commission. He served as a member and then chairman of the commission from 1929 to 1939.

Just prior to leaving office in January 1939, Democratic Governor Charles H. Martin replaced Carkin on the tax commission with the governor's executive secretary, Wallace S. Wharton. After leaving the tax commission, Carkin worked briefly on the legislative council for the Oregon House's taxation and revenue committee before the new Republican governor, Charles A. Sprague, appointed him director of the Oregon Public Utility Commission's rail transportation department. He worked for the Public Utility Commission for the next fifteen years.

In 1948, Governor John H. Hall appointed Carkin to the post of Public Utility Commissioner. However, after five months as commissioner, he asked to return to his previous position as head of the rail transportation department because he still needed a few more months in a civil service position to qualify for a state pension. Carkin finally retired from the Public Utilities Commission in 1954.

After leaving government service, Carkin remained active in local politics as well as civic and business affairs. He was chairman of the Marion County Republican central committee and served on Salem's city planning commission for 12 years. He was also chief counsel for the United States Savings and Loan League and served on several of the league's committees.

Carkin had been a member of Mutual Federal Savings and Loan Association's board of directors since the mid-1930s. Mutual Federal Savings and Loan was an important financial institution in the Salem community. In 1948, the institution changed its name to First Federal Savings and Loan Association. That same year, Carkin became the association's vice president. By 1950, he was president of First Federal Savings and Loan. He remained president for ten years. After retiring as president, Carkin continued to serve as a member of the savings and loan's board of directors until his death in 1971.

== Death and legacy ==
Carkin died in a Salem nursing home on January 24, 1971. A memorial service for him was held in Salem on January 29, 1971. He was buried in Salem's Lee Mission Cemetery.

On March 25, 1971, the Oregon House of Representatives passed a memorial resolution honoring Carkin and his service to the state of Oregon. Three days later, the Oregon State Senate passed its memorial tribute to Carkin.

Today, Carkin's papers are held in the University of Oregon library's special collections archive in Eugene. The files include correspondence, testimony, manuscripts, publications, and a variety of other documents from the period 1920 to 1960. The collection covers Carkin's service in the Oregon legislature, his work with the Oregon Tax Commission and Public Utilities Commission as well as his records from First Federal Savings and Loan and the United States Savings and Loan League.
