= Hector Macpherson Sr. =

American politician (1875–1970)

Member of the Oregon House of Representatives from the Linn County district
- In office 1928–1932
- In office 1940–1942

Personal details
- Born: April 22, 1875 Dufferin County, Ontario, Canada
- Died: March 28, 1970 (aged 94) Albany, Oregon, United States
- Party: Republican
- Spouse: Margaret Buchanan Dupee
- Profession: Professor, dairy farmer

Hector Macpherson Sr. (April 22, 1875 – March 28, 1970) was a Canadian–American academic and politician of Scottish descent. An academic, politician, and dairy farmer in the state of Oregon, he was the father of Hector Macpherson Jr.

== Biography ==
=== Early life ===
Hector Macpherson Sr. was born April 22, 1875 in Dufferin County, Ontario, Canada. He was the son of Miriam Fairgrieve Macpherson and Alexander Macpherson, native-born Scots who had emigrated to Canada.

=== Academic career ===
Hector attended Queen's University, located in Kingston, Ontario, from which he graduated with a Bachelor of Arts degree. He subsequently studied abroad at the University of Halle-Wittenberg and University of Berlin before returning to the United States to complete his Master of Arts degree in 1908 at the University of Chicago. While teaching sociology and economics for two years at the academic rank of Instructor at Michigan Agricultural College, Macpherson completed work on his PhD, which he also received from the University of Chicago.

Macpherson married the Chicago-born Margaret Buchanan Dupee in April 1911 and the newlywed couple made their way west, where Hector took a position as an assistant professor at Oregon Agricultural College (OAC), today's Oregon State University, in the fall of 1911.

In April 1913, Macpherson was tapped as one of two official Oregon delegates to the congress of the International Institute of Agriculture in Rome. As part of his three-month fact-finding tour, funded by the Oregon state legislature at the behest of the Oregon State Grange, Macpherson traveled to eight European countries studying the cooperative credit system as applied to agriculture. Following his return, Macpherson penned a series of articles in the Portland Oregonian detailing the specifics and potential cost-savings of cooperation as practiced in Denmark and Germany.

In August 1913, Oregon governor Oswald West again named Macpherson an official delegate to a Congress on Rural Credits and Farm Life, scheduled to be held in Washington, D.C. that same fall.

Macpherson continued to teach economics and sociology ("political economy") at OAC until 1926.

=== Political career ===
He was first elected to the state Oregon House of Representatives in 1927 and reelected in 1929 as a progressive Republican. Together with Henry Zorn, Macpherson sponsored a School Moving Bill in 1932. The ballot initiative proposed consolidating Oregon State University with the University of Oregon, and moving other state-funded schools to different cities. The initiative proposal was defeated.

Macpherson was elected to a final term in 1939.
