= Edward Schulmerich =

American politician

Oregon State Senator
- In office 1929–1933
- Constituency: Washington County

Member of the Oregon House of Representatives
- In office 1927–1929
- Constituency: Washington County

Personal details
- Born: 1863 El Dorado County, California
- Died: 1937 (aged 73–74) Oregon
- Resting place: Hillsboro Pioneer Cemetery; 45.52066°N 123.00544°W
- Party: Republican
- Spouse(s): Alice Bailey; Ellen Gillenwater
- Relations: Wes Schulmerich

Edward C. Schulmerich (1863–1937) was a businessman and politician in the U.S. state of Oregon. A native of California, his German family moved to Oregon when he was a boy, settling near Hillsboro. There he worked in the banking industry and other professional pursuits. A Republican, he served in both houses of the Oregon Legislative Assembly and prior to that on the city council of Hillsboro. His former home, the Edward Schulmerich House, is listed on the National Register of Historic Places.

== Early life ==
Edward Schulmerich was born in 1863 to Conrad and Margaret Schulmerich in El Dorado County, California. The parents were Germans who immigrated to the United States in 1850 and moved to California in 1856 to mine gold. The family moved to a farm in Washington County, Oregon, in 1875. There the younger Schulmerich received his education in the local schools and worked on the family farm.

At the age of 21 he left home to work in Portland for the Oregon Transfer Company, but returned on two occasions and remained until 1900 when his father died. Schulmerich started running one of the family farms in 1891 when his father retired. In 1900, he and his three brothers took over control of the three family farms. Schulmerich helped establish the Hillsboro Commercial Bank in 1906, serving as vice-president of the institution.

In 1909, he took over as president of the bank, and later was a director as well. The bank was located on Second and Main streets in downtown Hillsboro in a two-story brick building constructed in 1911. Schulmerich became the main shareholder of the Hillsboro Mercantile Company in 1916, managing the company until selling out in 1920. Other business activities included ownership in the Lumberman's National Bank of Portland, property holdings, and ownership of several cattle farms in partnership with his brothers. His ownership of an apartment building in Portland led to a lawsuit that reached the Oregon Supreme Court in 1934. He was sued by someone claiming Schulmerich owed them money, but Schulmerich won the case.

== Political career ==
Schulmerich entered politics at the local level when he was elected to the Hillsboro City Council in 1901. He served five, one-year terms on the council in total during two timeframes, from 1901 to 1903, and 1906 to 1909. In 1926, he was elected to the Oregon House of Representatives as a Republican in District 15 covering Washington County. After a single two-year term in the House, he was elected to serve in the Oregon State Senate in 1928. Schulmerich served one four-year term in the Senate representing District 11 and Washington County starting with the 1929 session, through the 1931 session.

== Later life and family ==
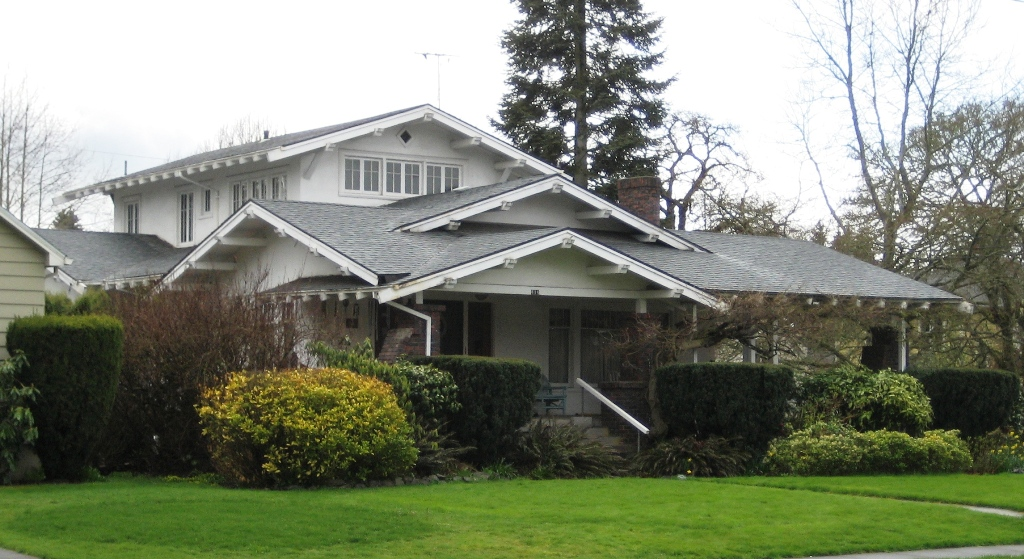
Edward Schulmerich House in 2008

In 1889, Schulmerich married Alice Bailey and the couple had three sons; Melvin, Roy, and Bruce. Alice died in 1901 and he then married Ellen Gillenwater, with no additional children for Schulmerich. His nephew Wes Schulmerich was a major league baseball player in the 1930s. About 1915, Schulmerich had a bungalow style home built on Main Street, and in 1991 the home was added to the National Register of Historic Places. In civic affairs he was member of the Masons and of the Knights of Pythias. Edward Schulmerich died in 1937 about the age of 74 and was buried in the Hillsboro Pioneer Cemetery.
