= Frank J. Lonergan =

American politician

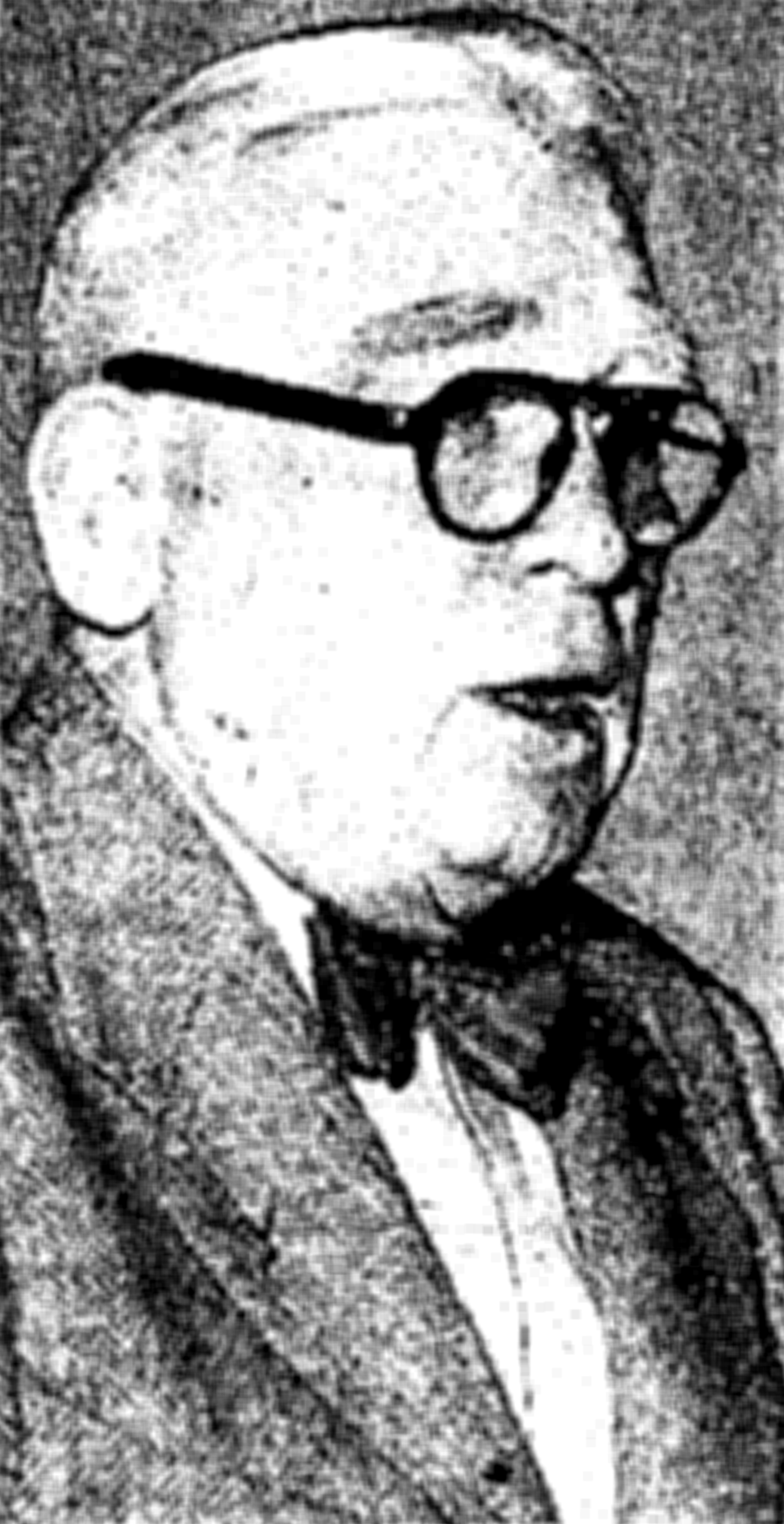

Circuit Judge

34th Speaker of the Oregon House of Representatives
- In office 1931–1932
- Preceded by: R. S. Hamilton
- Succeeded by: Earl Snell

Member of the Oregon House of Representatives

Personal details
- Born: May 27, 1882 Polo, Illinois
- Died: October 4, 1961 (aged 79) Portland, Oregon
- Party: Republican

Frank Lonergan was a Republican politician in the U.S. state of Oregon. A longtime member of the Oregon House of Representatives, he served as speaker for the 1931 regular session of the state legislature. He became a judge in Multnomah County in 1945 He notably oversaw the conviction of district attorney William Langley for failure to prosecute gambling, and ordered him removed from office.

In 1943, in Boston, he was elected the Grand Exalted Ruler of the Benevolent and Protective Order of Elks.

Lonergan was born in Polo, Illinois, the ninth of 10 children. He was a football star, team captain, and class president at Notre Dame University. He moved to Portland to accept a job offer by telegram, to teach and coach at the University of Portland (then known as Columbia University).
