= Molalla, Oregon =

- City
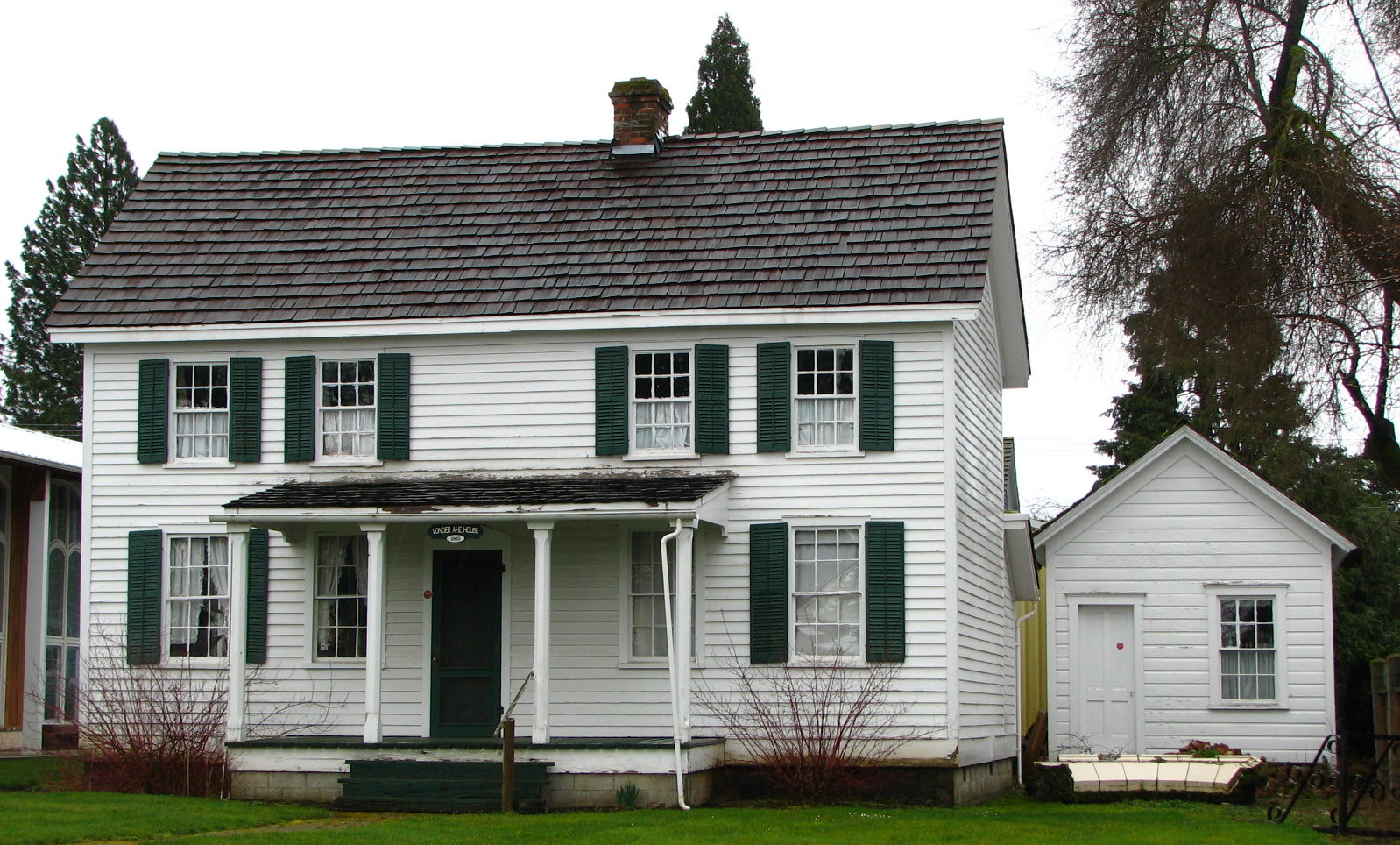
- Vonder Ahe House
- Nickname: "Home of the buckeroo"
- Motto: "Riding High for America"
- Location in Oregon
- Coordinates: 45°09′00″N 122°35′05″W
- Country: United States
- State: Oregon
- County: Clackamas
- Incorporated: 1913

Area
  - Total: 2.53 sq mi (6.55 km^{2})
  - Land: 2.48 sq mi (6.42 km^{2})
  - Water: 0.046 sq mi (0.12 km^{2})
- Elevation: 361 ft (110 m)

Population (2020)
  - Total: 10,228
  - Density: 4,124/sq mi (1,592.4/km^{2})
- Time zone: UTC-8 (Pacific)
  - Summer (DST): UTC-7 (Pacific)
- ZIP code: 97038
- Area code: 503
- FIPS code: 41-49450
- GNIS feature ID: 2411131
- Website: www.cityofmolalla.com

Molalla /məˈlɑːlə/ is a city in Clackamas County, Oregon. The population was 10,228 at the time of the 2020 census.

== History ==
Molalla was named after the Molalla River, which in turn was named for the Molala, a Native American tribe that inhabited the area. William H. Vaughan took up a donation land claim in the area in 1844. Molalla post office was established in 1850, near the site of Liberal, and was discontinued in 1851. The post office was reestablished in 1868 and it ran until 1874, then was reestablished in 1876, which is when it was probably placed at the present location of Molalla.

Since the late 1990s, the city experienced a surge in growth and expansion in the residential sector. In 2000, a number of franchised business have located in Molalla. In 2002, Molalla installed its first stoplight at the intersection of Oregon Route 211 and Oregon Route 213 because of the traffic brought by the increased business activity.

== Geography ==
Molalla is located in the foothills of the Cascade Range, near the Mount Hood National Forest, 15 miles (24 km) south of Oregon City and 13 miles (21 km) from Interstate 5. Molalla is surrounded by farms and rural residential development. There are many rock quarries, and thousands of acres of private timberlands, that feed natural resource materials into the economy. Several of the tree farms are managed for totally maintained and sustained forest.

According to the United States Census Bureau, the city has a total area of 2.26 square miles (5.85 km^{2}), of which 2.21 square miles (5.72 km^{2}) is land and 0.05 square miles (0.13 km^{2}) is water.

=== Climate ===
This region experiences warm (but not hot) and dry summers, with no average monthly temperatures above 71.6 °F (22.0 °C). According to the Köppen Climate Classification system, Molalla has a warm-summer Mediterranean climate, abbreviated Csb on climate maps.

Molalla receives precipitation ranging from an average of 0.60 inches (15 mm) in July to an average of 6.62 inches (168 mm) in December.

== Demographics ==
Historical population
Census	Pop.	Note	%±
1920	496		—
1930	655		32.1%
1940	907		38.5%
1950	1,497		65.0%
1960	1,501		0.3%
1970	2,005		33.6%
1980	2,992		49.2%
1990	3,651		22.0%
2000	5,666		55.2%
2010	8,108		43.1%
2020	10,228		26.1%
2021 (est.)	10,201		−0.3%
U.S. Decennial Census

=== 2020 census ===
As of the 2020 census, Molalla had a population of 10,228 and a population density of 4,235.2 people per square mile. The median age was 33.5 years; 27.6% of residents were under the age of 18 and 11.9% were 65 years of age or older. For every 100 females there were 97.3 males, and for every 100 females age 18 and over there were 94.3 males age 18 and over.

According to the 2020 Decennial Census Demographic and Housing Characteristics, 99.7% of residents lived in urban areas while 0.3% lived in rural areas.

There were 3,578 households in Molalla, of which 40.5% had children under the age of 18 living in them. Of all households, 49.7% were married-couple households, 16.9% were households with a male householder and no spouse or partner present, and 23.9% were households with a female householder and no spouse or partner present. About 22.2% of all households were made up of individuals and 9.0% had someone living alone who was 65 years of age or older.

There were 3,724 housing units, of which 3.9% were vacant. Among occupied housing units, 64.7% were owner-occupied and 35.3% were renter-occupied. The homeowner vacancy rate was 1.6% and the rental vacancy rate was 3.1%.

Racial composition as of the 2020 census
Race	Number	Percentage
White	8,158	79.8%
Black or African American	50	0.5%
American Indian and Alaska Native	93	0.9%
Asian	99	1.0%
Native Hawaiian and Other Pacific Islander	29	0.3%
Some other race	818	8.0%
Two or more races	981	9.6%
Hispanic or Latino (of any race)	1,620	15.8%

The ancestry of Molalla was 20.5% German, 12.9% Irish, 12.7% English, 7.1% Scottish, 5.1% Norwegian, 2.7% Italian, 1.8% French, and 0.1% Polish.

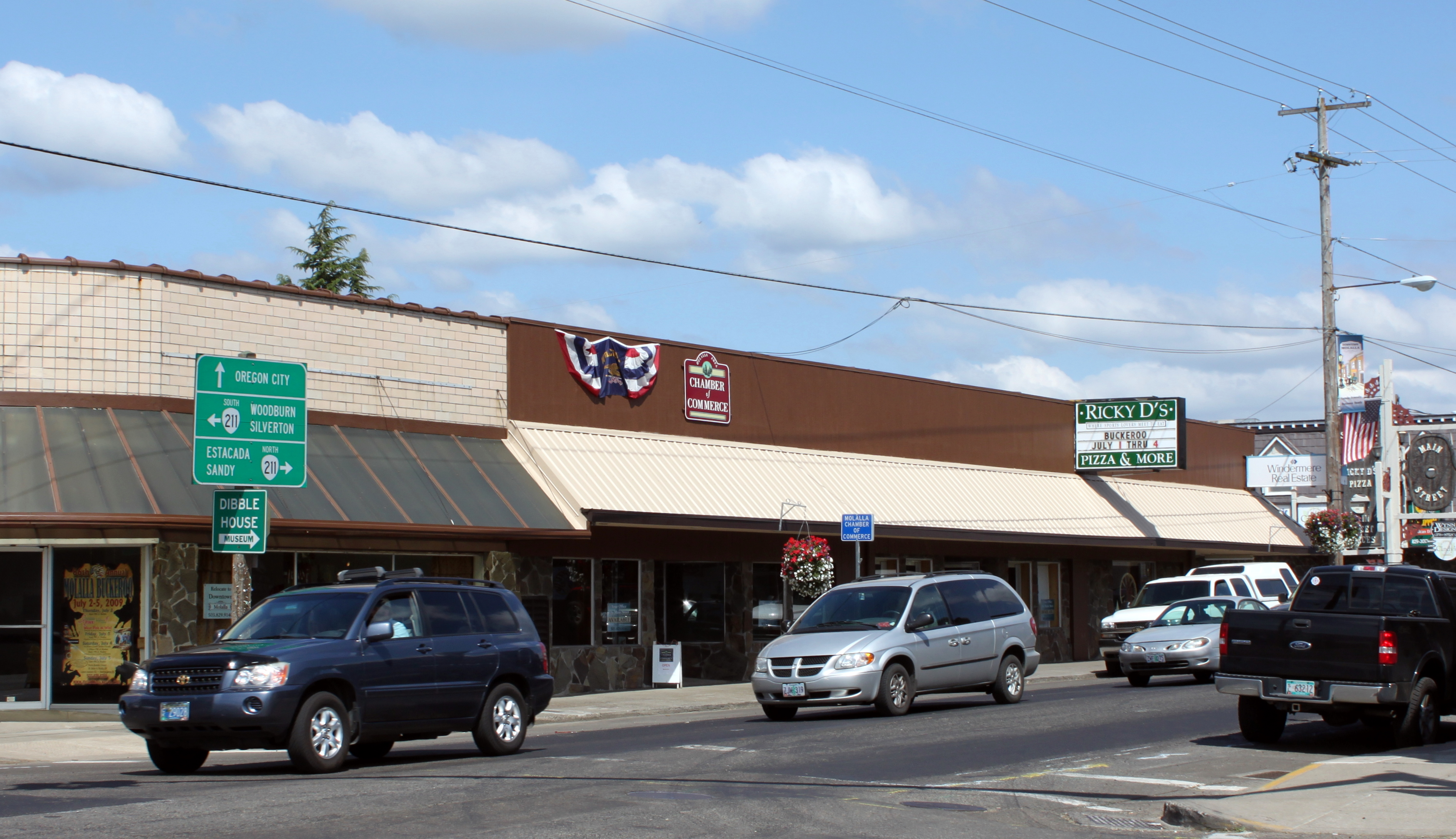
Main Street in Molalla

=== 2010 census ===
As of the census of 2010, there were 8,108 people, 2,857 households, and 2,067 families residing in the city. The population density was 3,668.8 inhabitants per square mile (1,416.5/km^{2}). There were 3,017 housing units at an average density of 1,365.2 per square mile (527.1/km^{2}). The racial makeup of the city was 86.9% White, 0.6% African American, 1.0% Native American, 0.8% Asian, 0.3% Pacific Islander, 7.5% from other races, and 2.9% from two or more races. Hispanic or Latino of any race were 14.5% of the population.

There were 2,857 households, of which 44.8% had children under the age of 18 living with them, 53.9% were married couples living together, 12.2% had a female householder with no husband present, 6.2% had a male householder with no wife present, and 27.7% were non-families. 22.5% of all households were made up of individuals, and 9.5% had someone living alone who was 65 years of age or older. The average household size was 2.82 and the average family size was 3.30.

The median age in the city was 31.4 years. 30.7% of residents were under the age of 18; 8.3% were between the ages of 18 and 24; 31.4% were from 25 to 44; 19.6% were from 45 to 64; and 9.8% were 65 years of age or older. The gender makeup of the city was 49.4% male and 50.6% female.

=== 2000 census ===
As of the census of 2000, there were 5,647 people, 1,948 households, and 1,425 families residing in the city. The population density was 2,939.4 inhabitants per square mile (1,134.9/km^{2}). There were 2,027 housing units at an average density of 1,055.1 per square mile (407.4/km^{2}). The racial makeup of the city was 88.60% White, 0.44% African American, 1.29% Native American, 0.50% Asian, 0.28% Pacific Islander, 6.69% from other races, and 2.20% from two or more races. Hispanic or Latino of any race were 10.55% of the population.

There were 1,948 households, out of which 43.8% had children under the age of 18 living with them, 56.7% were married couples living together, 11.6% had a female householder with no husband present, and 26.8% were non-families. 21.6% of all households were made up of individuals, and 9.2% had someone living alone who was 65 years of age or older. The average household size was 2.84 and the average family size was 3.29.

In the city, the population was spread out, with 31.8% under the age of 18, 9.7% from 18 to 24, 32.4% from 25 to 44, 15.6% from 45 to 64, and 10.6% who were 65 years of age or older. The median age was 30 years. For every 100 females, there were 94.7 males. For every 100 females age 18 and over, there were 91.3 males.

The median income for a household in the city was $42,672, and the median income for a family was $46,915. Males had a median income of $37,172 versus $25,988 for females. The per capita income for the city was $16,738. About 7.3% of families and 9.7% of the population were below the poverty line, including 10.2% of those under age 18 and 10.8% of those age 65 or over.

== Economy ==
Molalla's economy was traditionally based on logging and agriculture, but with the downturn in the timber industry, the city is turning to commerce to revitalize its economy. Major employers in Molalla include the Molalla River School District and RSG Forest Products. Natural resource recovery still stands out in Molalla. Many logging, road construction, quarrying and trucking companies provide services to the timber land managers in the timber rich area. Rapid growth species of trees have been planted and cultivated for timber and fiber. Aggregate, mined in the foothills, provides gravel for roads, asphalt highways and roads throughout the region. An expanding agritourism industry is currently taking root in the more pastoral parts of the small lumber town, with the most promising examples being Posse Acres Elk Farm and Petting Zoo, The Abbey Farm Creamery and Out In The Garden Nursery, and the American Wildlife Foundation.

== Arts and culture ==
=== Annual cultural events ===
Molalla is the home of the Molalla Buckeroo rodeo (it began in 1913, the same time as the city was founded) and the Apple Festival. The Pacific Coast Freestyle Championships, a model airplane aerobatic tournament, has been held there for 14 years in late July. Several Latino rodeos are held at the rodeo facility by "LaFortuna" in spring, mid-summer, late summer and fall, bringing tens of thousands of Latino families to celebrate in the community. The Fourth of July Parade, sponsored by the Molalla Area Chamber of Commerce, often sports 50,000 spectators. Many other minor festivals—Halloween on Main Street, Christmas in the City, Spring Fling, Easter Egg Hunt in the Park, Fishing Derbies, Trail Rides, The Brew Fest, The North Valley High School Rodeo—all add to the quality of life in Molalla.

=== Share The Love ===
Since 2001, Molalla High School has put on an event called Share The Love. The event was founded by teacher Joe Zenisek, known as Dr. Z, in order to raise money for medical supplies in the Philippines. The required $400 took around 6 months to raise. The month of February was set aside for its focus on love, while the Share The Love moniker was derived from a student. The event consists of student-run and business-run events throughout the community. In 2023, Share The Love raised $131,000 for 3 families.

=== Museums and other points of interest ===
There is a miniature steam train, the Shady Dell Pacific Railroad, in Molalla Train Park three miles east of Molalla. An interesting and free exhibit of Rodeo History Honors the "Heroes" of Rodeo memorialized in large brass plaques placed in the sidewalks of Molalla's city core. The Horace L. Dibble House and the Fred Vonder Ahe House and Summer Kitchen are buildings in Molalla on the National Register of Historic Places (NRHP) that have been preserved by the Molalla Area Historical Society. The NRHP-listed Rock Creek Methodist Church and William Hatchette Vaughan House are also in the Molalla area.

== Parks and recreation ==
The Molalla River corridor offers opportunities for outdoor activities, including fishing, hunting, and hiking. Along the corridor to the east, Table Rock is a favorite local rocky promontory that provides visitors with a view of Molalla and the surrounding countryside for miles in every direction. Neighborhood and community parks include Fox, Clark, Long, and Ivor Davies Parks. Clark Park has a large open space, oak tree grove and playground. Long Park has a playground, a pavilion, and a beautiful bear carving. Fox Park hosts summer concerts and has a playground, pavilion, and splash pad for children. A long pedestrian and bicycle-friendly path extends through Ivor Davies Park over several small bridges and around a fish pond.

== Education ==
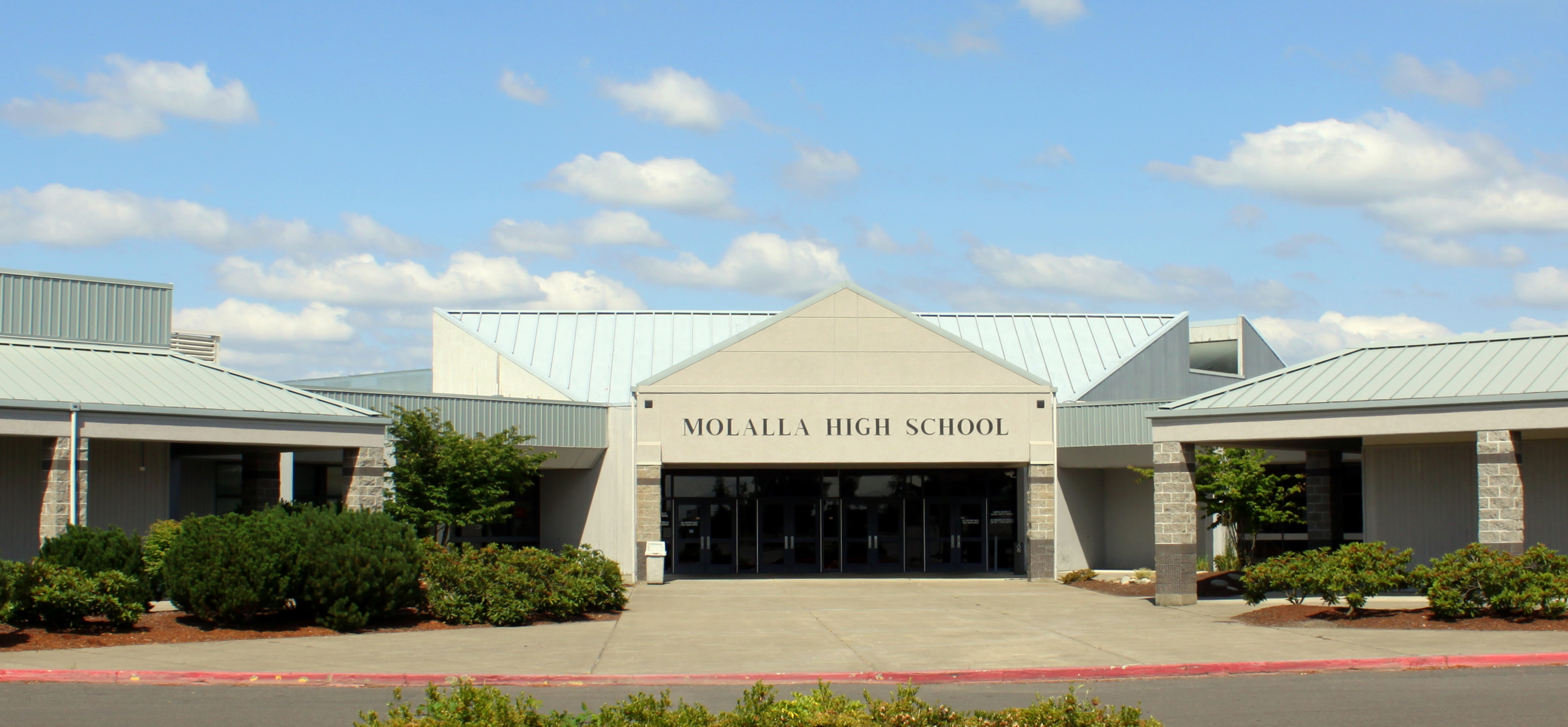
Molalla High School

Molalla is served by the Molalla River School District. There are two public high schools within the Molalla River School District, Molalla High School , and seven primary and middle schools. Molalla is also home of the private Country Christian School which serves students from preschool to twelfth grade (PK–12) and has 288 students. Both schools compete in the Oregon School Activities Association. There is a middle school, an elementary school, and two public Charter Schools: Molalla River Academy, and Renaissance Public Academy.

The city operates a public library that is part of the Library Information Network of Clackamas County.

== Media ==
The Herald-Pioneer is a weekly newspaper covering Molalla and nearby Canby. It was formed by a 2020 merger of the Molalla Pioneer, which had covered the city since 1913, with the Canby Herald. It is published by Carpenter Media Group. Molalla is also served by radio and TV broadcasting stations from Portland, and residents have access to cable and satellite systems.

== Infrastructure ==
=== Transportation ===
==== Road ====
Molalla's principal road links are Oregon routes 211 and 213. Route 213, heading north, links Molalla to Oregon City and Portland. Heading south, Route 213 connects Molalla to Silverton and Salem. Route 211, which intersects Route 213, connects the city to Canby and Woodburn to the west, and Colton, Estacada, and Sandy to the east.

===== Transit =====
The South Clackamas Transportation District (formerly known as Molalla Transportation District) provides a route around town as well as service to Canby and Clackamas Community College in Oregon City. Prior to 1989, regional transit agency TriMet provided transit service to Molalla, but the city withdrew from the TriMet district on January 1, 1989, in hopes that it would be able to provide better service at a lower net cost by no longer having to pay the TriMet payroll tax. TriMet had been serving the area since 1970, when it took over a private bus company named Estacada–Molalla Stages, which had served the area since the 1930s but had discontinued service to Molalla by at least 1966.

==== Air ====
Molalla is served by a number of small regional airports:

- Skydive Oregon (Inside the city limits)
- Portland-Mulino Airport, about 4 miles (6 km) north
- Lenhardt Airpark, about 11 miles (18 km) west
- Aurora State Airport, about 12 miles (19 km) northwest

==== Rail ====
Molalla does not have a rail link within city limits anymore, although it was formerly served by the Oregon Pacific Railroad. The Oregon Pacific tracks now end at Liberal, 3 miles (5 km) to the north. The closest Amtrak station is in Oregon City.

=== Utilities ===
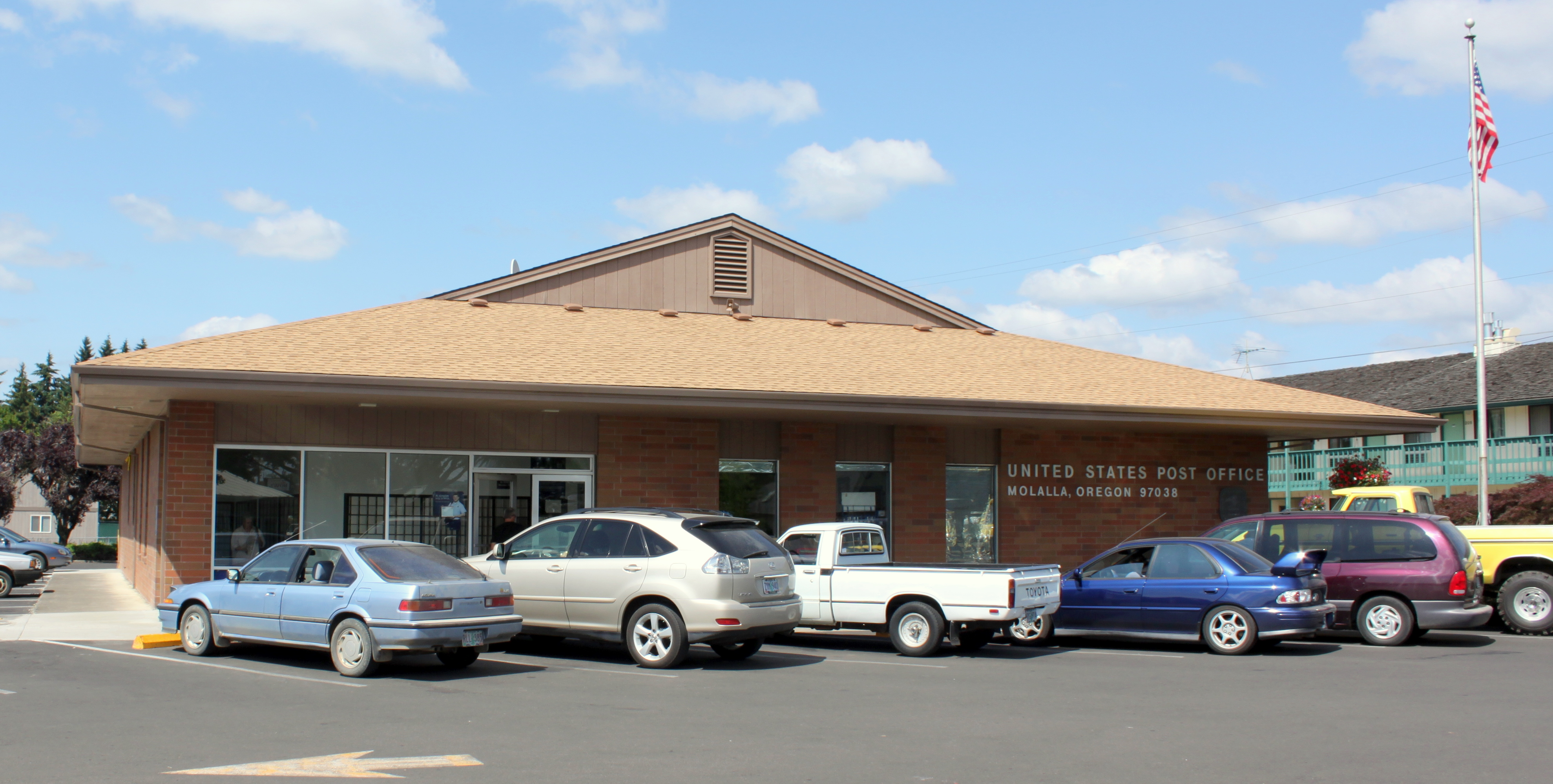
Molalla post office

Water and wastewater treatment are provided by the City of Molalla. Natural gas is provided by NW Natural and electricity is provided by Portland General Electric. Internet and Voice service provided by local cooperative Molalla Communications.

=== Healthcare ===
Molalla is served by the Providence Medical Group Clinic in Molalla, Legacy Medical Group Family Medicine in Molalla, Silverton Hospital in Silverton, Meridian Park Hospital in Tualatin and Willamette Falls Hospital in Oregon City.

== Notable people ==
- Roger Beyer, Oregon state senator
- Kevin Freeman, Olympic equestrian
- Ralph M. Holman, Oregon Supreme Court judge
- Rufus C. Holman, United States senator
- Lisa Jackson, author
- Macy Morse, peace activist
