= 42nd Oregon Legislative Assembly =

| ← | 41st Legislative Assembly | 43rd Legislative Assembly | → |
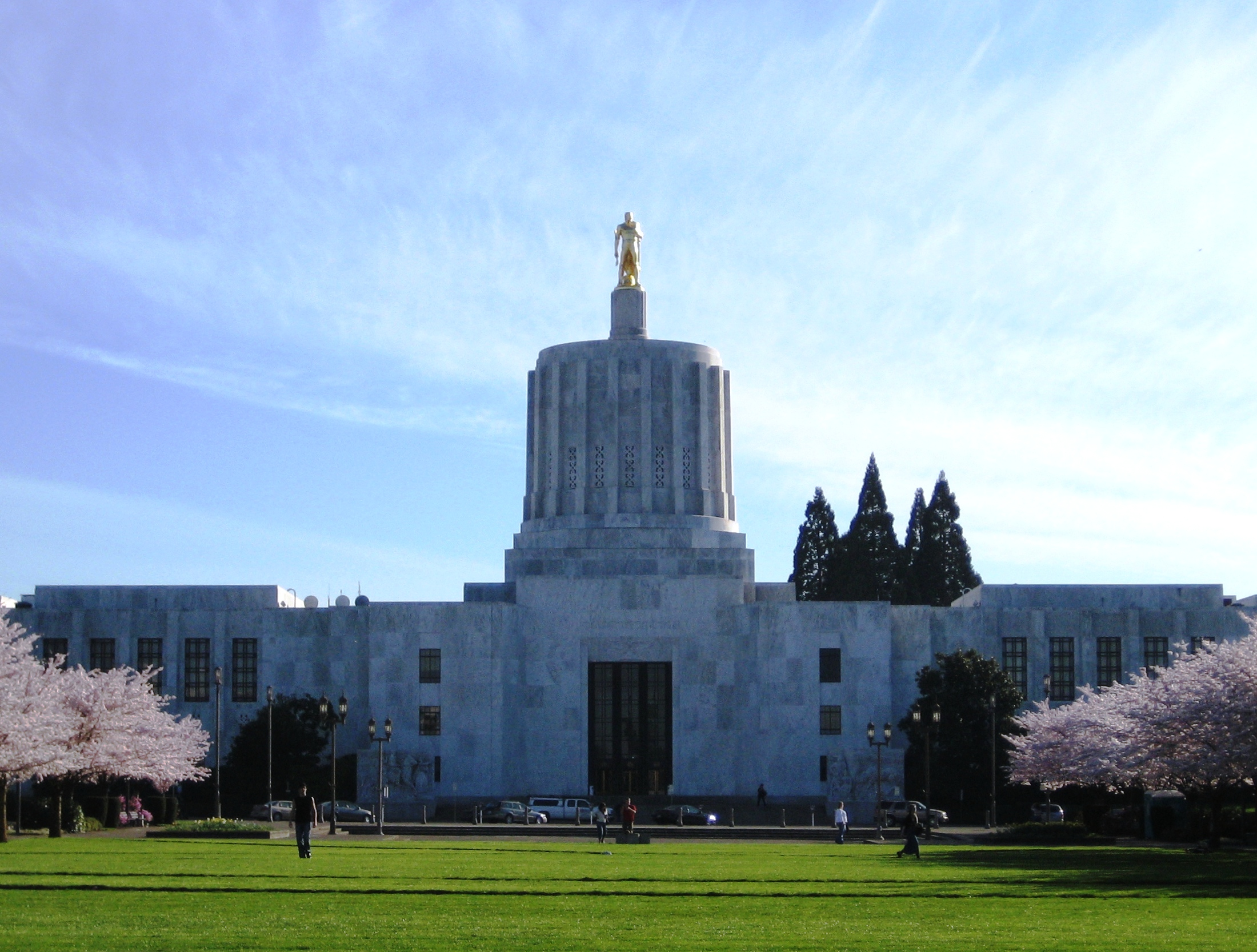
- The legislature took place in the Oregon State Capitol, seen here in 2007

Overview
- Legislative body: Oregon Legislative Assembly
- Jurisdiction: Oregon, United States
- Meeting place: Oregon State Capitol
- Term: 1943
- Website: www.oregonlegislature.gov

Oregon State Senate
- Members: 30 Senators
- Senate President: William H. Steiwer
- Party control: Republican Party of Oregon

Oregon House of Representatives
- Members: 60 Representatives
- Speaker of the House: William M. McAllister
- Party control: Republican Party of Oregon

The 42nd Oregon Legislative Assembly was the legislative session of the Oregon Legislative Assembly that convened from January 11, 1943, to March 10, 1943. Some legislators were elected in November 1942 but decided to enter military service in World War II, so others were appointed to fill their vacancies.

== Senate ==
| Affiliation | Members |
| Democratic | 3 |
| Republican | 27 |
| Total | 30 |
| Government Majority | 24 |

== Senate Members ==
Composition of the Senate
| Senator | Residence | Party |
|---|---|---|
| Howard Belton | Canby | Republican |
| Dr. James A. Best | Pendleton | Republican |
| Dr. Joel C. Booth | Lebanon | Republican |
| William E. Burke | Sherwood | Republican |
| Allan Carson (Note: Allan Carson served in the military; John H. Carson filled the vacancy pro tempore) | Salem | Republican |
| John H. Carson | Salem | Republican |
| Merle R. Chessman | Astoria | Republican |
| Marshall E. Cornett | Klamath Falls | Republican |
| Rex Ellis | Pendleton | Republican |
| Earl E. Fisher | Beaverton | Republican |
| Angus Gibson | Junction City | Republican |
| James N. Jones | Vale | Republican |
| Dr. H. R. Kauffman | Toledo | Republican |
| Frederick S. Lamport (Note: Douglas McKay served in the military; Frederick S. Lamport filled the seat pro tempore) | Salem | Republican |
| Douglas McKay | Salem | Republican |
| Dorothy McCullough Lee | Portland | Republican |
| J. J. Lynch | Portland | Republican |
| Chester E. McCarty (Note: Chester E. McCarthy was serving in the military; J. J. Lynch filled the vacancy pro tempore) | Portland | Republican |
| Thomas R. Mahoney | Portland | Democratic |
| Coe A. McKenna | Portland | Republican |
| Earl T. Newbry | Ashland | Republican |
| Thomas Parkinson | Roseburg | Republican |
| Lee Patterson | Portland | Republican |
| Irving Rand | Portland | Republican |
| Peter J. Stadelman | The Dalles | Republican |
| William H. Steiwer | Fossil | Republican |
| W. H. Strayer | Baker | Democratic |
| Dean Walker | Independence | Republican |
| Lew Wallace | Portland | Democratic |
| William Walsh | Marshfield | Republican |
| Halvor C. Wheeler | Dexter | Republican |
| Louis W. Wipperman | Grants Pass | Republican |
| Charles H. Zurcher | Enterprise | Republican |

== House ==
| Affiliation | Members |
| Democratic | 12 |
| Republican | 48 |
| Total | 60 |
| Government Majority | 36 |

== House Members ==
Composition of the House
| House Member | Residence | Party |
|---|---|---|
| Robert A. Bennett | Portland | Republican |
| Phil Brady | Portland | Democratic |
| Dean F. Bryson | Portland | Republican |
| Vernon D. Bull | La Grande | Democratic |
| Ned H. Callaway | Brownsville | Democratic |
| W. W. Chadwick | Salem | Republican |
| Truman A. Chase | Eugene | Republican |
| H. H. Chindgren | Molalla | Republican |
| Louis H. Craver | Klamath Falls | Republican |
| Stella A. Cutlip | North Bend | Republican |
| F. H. Dammasch | Portland | Republican |
| Frank Deich | Portland | Republican |
| John Dickson | Portland | Republican |
| Robert E. Duniway | Portland | Republican |
| Anna M. Ellis | Garibaldi | Republican |
| Carl Engdahl | Pendleton | Republican |
| Leif S. Finseth | Dallas | Republican |
| Carl H. Francis | Dayton | Republican |
| Giles L. French | Moro | Republican |
| R. C. Frisbie | Baker | Republican |
| Walter J. Gearin | Portland | Democratic |
| Robert C. Gile | Roseburg | Republican |
| J. S. Greenwood | Wemme | Republican |
| John Hubert Hall | Portland | Republican |
| Joseph E. Harvey | Portland | Democratic |
| Donald E. Heisler | The Dalles | Democratic |
| Fred A. Hellberg | Astoria | Republican |
| H. T. Hesse | Hillsboro | Republican |
| Carl C. Hill | Days Creek | Republican |
| Earl H. Hill | Cushman | Republican |
| Fred Himelwright | Joseph | Republican |
| Fred C. Homes (Note: Fred C. Homes served Frank J. Van Dyke's term from January 11 to February 4 inclusive pro tempore. Van Dyke upon discharge from the army was appointed to the seat February 5) | Ashland | Republican |
| Frank J. Van Dyke | Ashland | Republican |
| H. R. Jones | Salem | Republican |
| E. W. Kimberling | Prairie City | Republican |
| H. A. Kuratli | Hillsboro | Democratic |
| E. Riddell Lage | Hood River | Republican |
| Max M. Landon | Sweet Home | Republican |
| C. L. Lieuallen | Pendleton | Republican |
| Eugene E. Marsh | McMinnville | Republican |
| Kenneth S. Martin | Grants Pass | Republican |
| William M. McAllister | Medford | Republican |
| A. W. Meyers | Milwaukie | Republican |
| Ralph T. Moore | Bandon | Republican |
| William Niskanen | Bend | Republican |
| Walter J. Pearson | Portland | Democratic |
| J. D. Perry | St. Helens | Democratic |
| Henry E. Peterson | Ione | Republican |
| Stanhope S. Pier | Portland | Republican |
| L. M. Ramage | Salem | Republican |
| Alexander Rennie | Corvallis | Republican |
| Henry Semon | Klamath Falls | Republican |
| F. Leo Smith | Portland | Democratic |
| John R. Snellstrom | Eugene | Republican |
| Burt K. Snyder | Lakeview | Republican |
| V. B. Staples | Ontario | Republican |
| John F. Steelhammer | Salem | Republican |
| Howard W. Turner | Madras | Republican |
| Harvey Wells | Portland | Democratic |
| Joe Wilson | Newport | Republican |
| Manley J. Wilson | Wauna | Republican |
