= 40th Oregon Legislative Assembly =

←	39th Legislative Assembly	41st Legislative Assembly	→
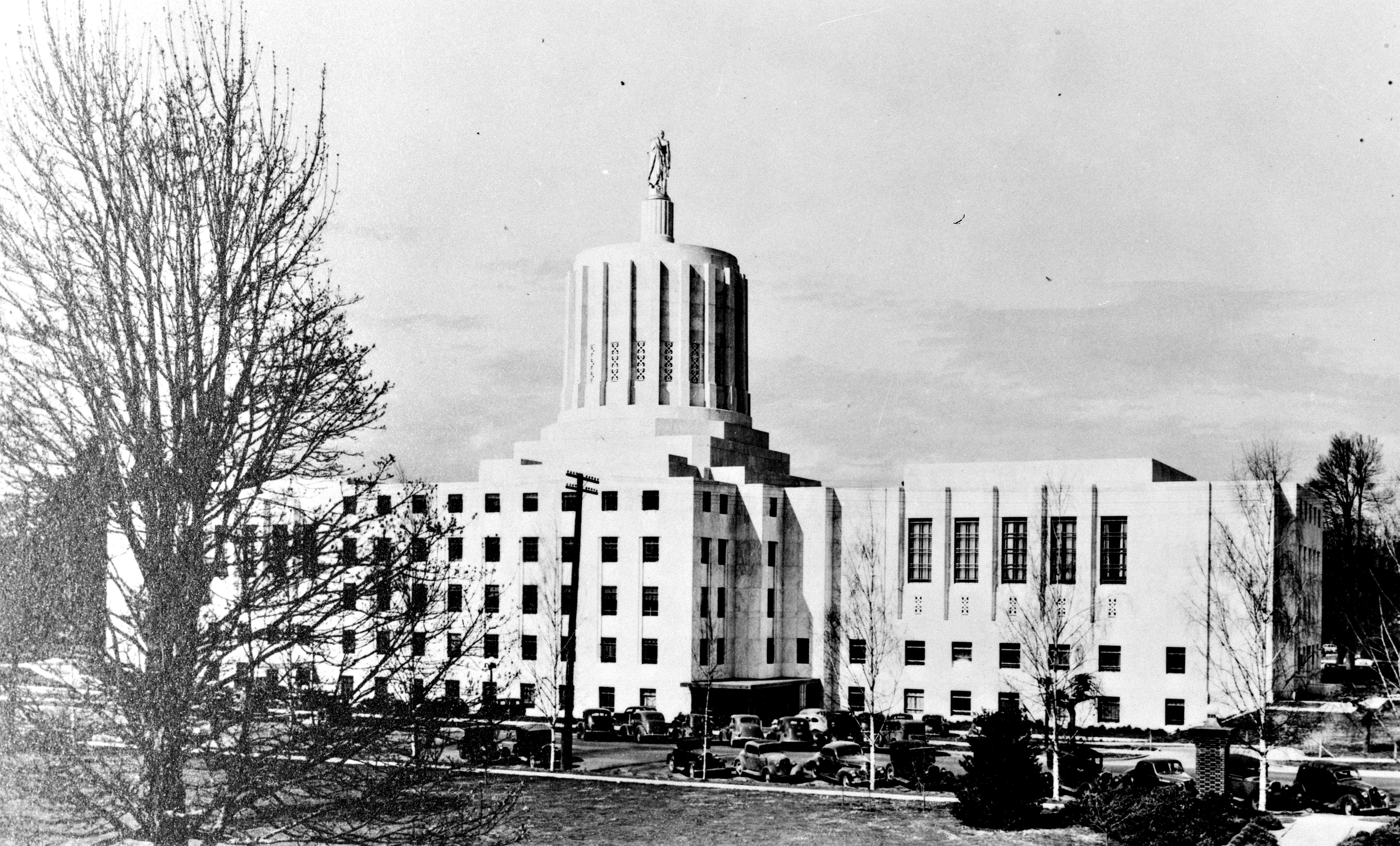
- Backside of the capitol in 1939

Overview
- Legislative body: Oregon Legislative Assembly
- Jurisdiction: Oregon, United States
- Meeting place: Oregon State Capitol
- Term: 1939
- Website: www.oregonlegislature.gov

Oregon State Senate
- Members: 30 Senators
- Senate President: Robert M. Duncan
- Party control: Republican Party of Oregon

Oregon House of Representatives
- Members: 60 Representatives
- Speaker of the House: Ernest R. Fatland
- Party control: Republican Party of Oregon

The 40th Oregon Legislative Assembly was the legislative session of the Oregon Legislative Assembly that convened on January 9, 1939 and adjourned March 15. It was the first legislature held in the current completed capitol after the 1935 fire destroyed the previous capitol. A notable event was the death of Senator George T. Eayrs, who collapsed at his desk in the afternoon of March 13, and was pronounced dead soon after. Senators James A. Best and Joel C. Booth, both doctors, attempted to revive him unsuccessfully.

== Senate ==
Affiliation	Members
Democratic	7
Republican	23
Total	30
Government Majority	16

== Senate Members ==
Composition of the Senate
Senator	Residence	Party
Ulysses S. Balentine	Klamath Falls	Republican
Howard Belton	Canby	Republican
Dr. James A. Best	Pendleton	Republican
Dr. Joel C. Booth	Lebanon	Republican
William E. Burke	Sherwood	Republican
George H. Chaney	Coquille	Democratic
Charles Childs	Albany	Republican
C. W. Clark	Roseburg	Republican
Ashby C. Dickson	Portland	Democratic
William L. Dickson	Portland	Democratic
Robert M. Duncan	Burns	Republican
George W. Dunn	Ashland	Republican
George T. Eayrs 𐠒	Portland	Democratic
Rex Ellis	Pendleton	Republican
Frank M. Franciscovich	Astoria	Republican
Ronald E. Jones	Brooks	Republican
Harry M. Kenin	Portland	Republican
Dorothy McCullough Lee	Portland	Republican
Thomas R. Mahoney	Portland	Democratic
Douglas McKay	Salem	Republican
Lyman Ross	Aloha	Democratic
Peter J. Stadelman	The Dalles	Republican
Isaac E. Staples	Tillamook	Republican
William H. Steiwer	Fossil	Republican
W. H. Strayer	Baker	Democratic
Dean Walker	Independence	Republican
Lew Wallace	Portland	Democratic
Halvor C. Wheeler	Dexter	Republican
Louis W. Wipperman	Grants Pass	Republican
Charles H. Zurcher	Enterprise	Republican

== House ==
Affiliation	Members
Democratic	13
Republican	46
Independent	1
Total	60

== House Members ==
Composition of the House
House Member	Residence	Party
Clarence E. Ash	Astoria	Republican
Harry D. Boivin	Klamath Falls	Democratic
C. C. Bradley	Portland	Republican
Phil Brady	Portland	Democratic
Vernon D. Bull	La Grande	Democratic
H. A. Canady	Roseburg	Republican
Roy E. Carter	Gold Beach	Democratic
Jack R. Caufield	Tillamook	Democratic
C.C. Chapman	Portland	Republican
Truman A. Chase	Eugene	Republican
H. H. Chindgren	Molalla	Republican
Alfred F. Cunha	Pendleton	Republican
Frank Deich	Portland	Republican
George R. Duncan	Stayton	Republican
Carl Engdahl	Pendleton	Republican
Robert S. Farrell Jr.	Portland	Republican
Ernest R. Fatland	Condon	Republican
Earl E. Fisher	Beaverton	Republican
Giles L. French	Moro	Republican
Walter Fuhrer	Salem	Republican
Angus Gibson	Junction City	Republican
A. S. Grant	Baker	Democratic
J. S. Greenwood	Wemme	Republican
John Hubert Hall	Portland	Republican
Walter E. Hempstead	Portland	Republican
Fred W. Herman	Rainier	Republican
H. T. Hesse	Hillsboro	Republican
Earl H. Hill	Cushman	Republican
Frank H. Hilton	Portland	Republican
C. T. Hockett	Enterprise	Republican
Dr. Jacob Frederick Hosch	Bend	Independent
E. W. Kimberling	Prairie City	Republican
E. W. Kirkpatrick	Milwaukie	Democratic
Frank J. Lonergan	Portland	Republican
Hector Macpherson Sr.	Albany	Republican
Eugene E. Marsh	McMinnville	Republican
Hannah Martin	Salem	Republican
William M. McAllister	Medford	Republican
J. H. McCloskey	Norway	Democratic
John B. McCourt	Portland	Republican
Coe A. McKenna	Portland	Republican
W. H. Miller	Grants Pass	Democratic
Christina Munroe	Hood River	Democratic
L. D. Nash	Nashville	Republican
Earl T. Newbry	Ashland	Republican
W. R. Osborne	Amity	Republican
J. D. Perry	Deer Island	Democratic
Stanhope S. Pier	Portland	Republican
Alexander Rennie	Corvallis	Republican
Glenn N. Riddle	Riddle	Republican
Henry Semon	Klamath Falls	Democratic
F. Leo Smith	Portland	Democratic
Burt K. Snyder	Lakeview	Republican
V. B. Staples	Ontario	Republican
John F. Steelhammer	Salem	Republican
Lyle D. Thomas	West Salem	Republican
Howard W. Turner	Madras	Republican
Harvey Wells	Portland	Republican
Harry R. Wiley	Albany	Republican
Malcolm W. Wilkinson	The Dalles	Republican
