= 41st Oregon Legislative Assembly =

| ← | 40th Legislative Assembly | 42nd Legislative Assembly | → |
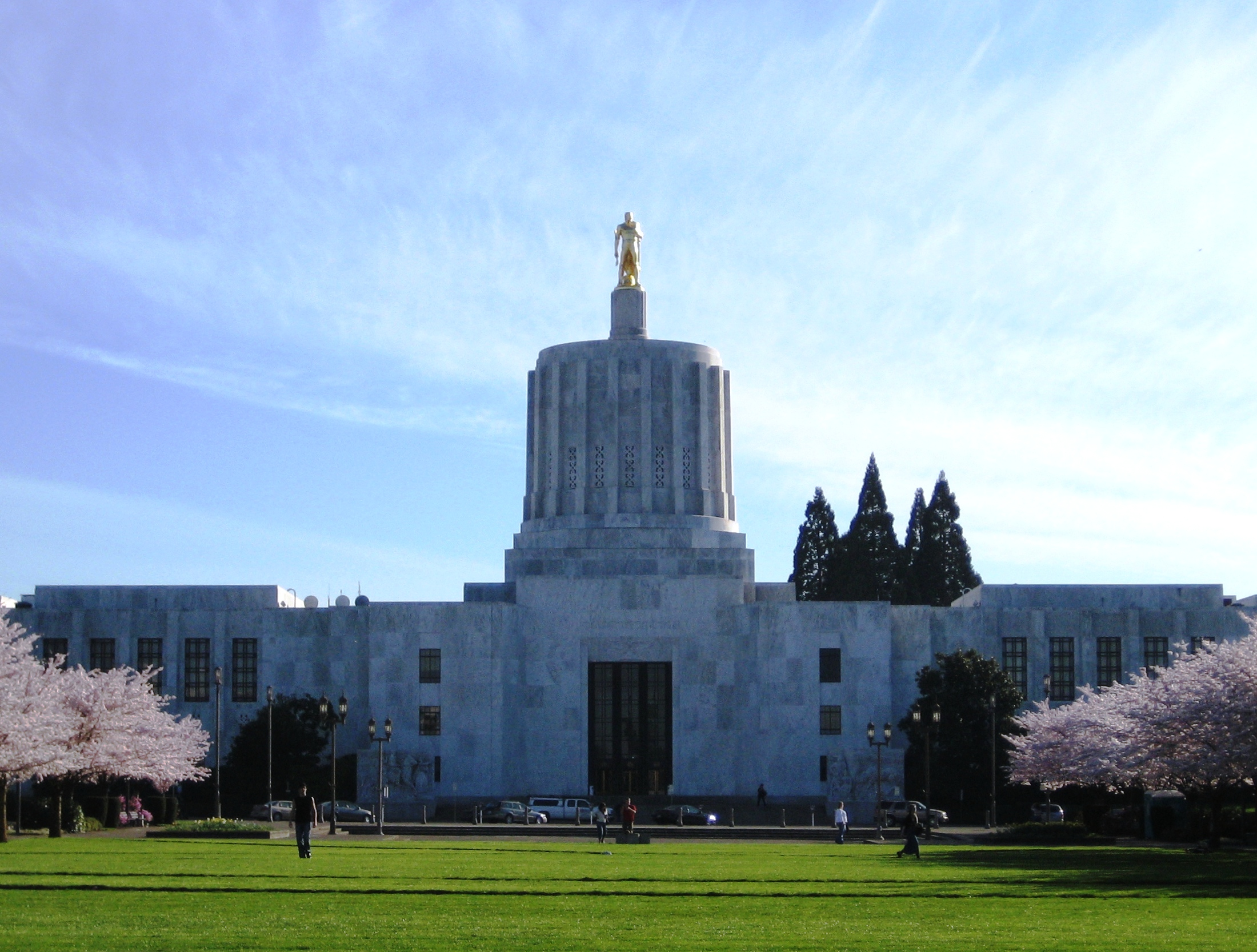
- The legislature took place in the Oregon State Capitol, seen here in 2007

Overview
- Legislative body: Oregon Legislative Assembly
- Jurisdiction: Oregon, United States
- Meeting place: Oregon State Capitol
- Term: 1941
- Website: www.oregonlegislature.gov

Oregon State Senate
- Members: 30 Senators
- Senate President: Dean Walker
- Party control: Republican Party of Oregon

Oregon House of Representatives
- Members: 60 Representatives
- Speaker of the House: Robert S. Farrell Jr.
- Party control: Republican Party of Oregon

The 41st Oregon Legislative Assembly was the legislative session of the Oregon Legislative Assembly that convened on January 13, 1941 and adjourned March 15.

== Senate ==
| Affiliation | Members |
| Democratic | 5 |
| Republican | 25 |
| Total | 30 |
| Government Majority | 20 |

== Senate Members ==
Composition of the Senate
| Senator | Residence | Party |
|---|---|---|
| Howard Belton | Canby | Republican |
| Dr. James A. Best | Pendleton | Republican |
| Dr. Joel C. Booth | Lebanon | Republican |
| William E. Burke | Sherwood | Republican |
| Charles Childs | Albany | Republican |
| C. W. Clark (Note: C. W. Clark died March 10, and Harris Ellsworth was appointed the last day of the session, March 15, to fill his seat.) | Roseburg | Republican |
| Harris Ellsworth | Roseburg | Republican |
| Marshall E. Cornett | Klamath Falls | Republican |
| Ashby C. Dickson | Portland | Democratic |
| Rex Ellis | Pendleton | Republican |
| Earl E. Fisher | Beaverton | Republican |
| Frank M. Franciscovich | Astoria | Republican |
| James N. Jones | Vale | Republican |
| Ronald E. Jones | Brooks | Republican |
| Dr. H. R. Kauffman | Toledo | Republican |
| Harry M. Kenin | Portland | Republican |
| Dorothy McCullough Lee | Portland | Republican |
| Thomas R. Mahoney | Portland | Democratic |
| Douglas McKay | Salem | Republican |
| Coe A. McKenna | Portland | Republican |
| Walter E. Pearson | Portland | Democratic |
| Louis W. Sipperman | Grants Pass | Republican |
| Peter J. Stadelman | The Dalles | Republican |
| William H. Steiwer | Fossil | Republican |
| W. H. Strayer | Baker | Democratic |
| Dean Walker | Independence | Republican |
| Lew Wallace | Portland | Democratic |
| William Walsh | Marshfield | Republican |
| Halvor C. Wheeler | Dexter | Republican |
| Charles H. Zurcher | Enterprise | Republican |

== House ==
| Affiliation | Members |
| Democratic | 14 |
| Republican | 46 |
| Total | 60 |
| Government Majority | 32 |

== House Members ==
Composition of the House
| House Member | Residence | Party |
|---|---|---|
| A. Hugh Adams | Portland | Democratic |
| E. C. Allen | Portland | Democratic |
| Harry D. Boivin | Klamath Falls | Democratic |
| C. C. Bradley | Portland | Republican |
| Phil Brady | Portland | Democratic |
| Erling L. Brauti (Note: J. R. Caufield resigned, Erling L. Brauti was appointed to the seat.) | Wheeler | Democratic |
| J. R. Caufield | Wheeler | Democratic |
| Vernon D. Bull | La Grande | Democratic |
| Ned H. Callaway | Brownsville | Democratic |
| Allen G. Carson | Salem | Republican |
| Roy E. Carter | Gold Beach | Democratic |
| Truman A. Chase | Eugene | Republican |
| H. H. Chindgren | Molalla | Republican |
| O. L. Babcock (Note: O. L. Babcock died, Alfred F. Cunha was appointed to the seat.) | Pendleton | Republican |
| Alfred F. Cunha | Pendleton | Republican |
| George R. Duncan | Stayton | Republican |
| Carl Engdahl | Pendleton | Republican |
| Warren Erwin | Portland | Democratic |
| Robert S. Farrell Jr. | Portland | Republican |
| Giles L. French | Moro | Republican |
| R. C. Frisbie | Baker | Republican |
| Angus Gibson | Junction City | Republican |
| Robert C. Gile | Roseburg | Republican |
| M. James Gleason | Portland | Democratic |
| J. S. Greenwood | Wemme | Republican |
| William H. Hedlund | Oswego | Democratic |
| Donald E. Heisler | The Dalles | Republican |
| H. T. Hesse | Hillsboro | Republican |
| Carl C. Hill | Days Creek | Republican |
| C. T. Hockett | Enterprise | Republican |
| J. F. Hosch | Bend | Democratic |
| George C. Huggins (Note: J. H. McCloskey resigned due to injuries in a car accident, George C. Huggins was appointed to fill the vacancy) | Marshfield | Democratic |
| J. H. McCloskey | Marshfield | Democratic |
| Ray L. Jenkins | Toledo | Democratic |
| H. R. Jones | Salem | Republican |
| E. W. Kimberling | Prairie City | Republican |
| H. A. Kuratli | Hillsboro | Republican |
| E. Riddell Lage | Hood River | Republican |
| Wallace S. Larkin | Newberg | Democratic |
| Frank J. Lonergan | Portland | Republican |
| Eugene E. Marsh | McMinnville | Republican |
| Kenneth S. Martin | Grants Pass | Republican |
| William M. McAllister | Medford | Republican |
| John B. McCourt | Portland | Republican |
| A. W. Meyers | Milwaukie | Republican |
| E. Harvey Miller | Heppner | Republican |
| William B. Morse | Prineville | Republican |
| Richard L. Neuberger | Portland | Democratic |
| Earl T. Newbry | Ashland | Republican |
| J. D. Perry | Deer Island | Democratic |
| Stanhope S. Pier | Portland | Republican |
| Alexander Rennie | Corvallis | Republican |
| James A. Rodman | Eugene | Republican |
| Henry Semon | Klamath Falls | Democratic |
| F. Leo Smith | Portland | Democratic |
| Burt K. Snyder | Lakeview | Republican |
| V. B. Staples | Ontario | Republican |
| John F. Steelhammer | Salem | Republican |
| Fred Thiel | Astoria | Democratic |
| Lyle D. Thomas | West Salem | Republican |
| Orval N. Thompson | Albany | Democratic |
| Harvey Wells | Portland | Republican |
| Manley J. Wilson | Wauna | Democratic |
