= List of Oregon Legislative Assemblies =

The legislature of the U.S. state of Oregon has convened many times since statehood became effective on February 14, 1859. It continues to operate under the amended 1857 Oregon Constitution. (Note: The Oregon Constitution of 1857, Article IV, specified election in June of state senators every four years and representatives every two years. Terms of office began the day after election. Sessions for both houses started in September.)

== Territorial legislatures ==
- 1849 Oregon Territorial Legislature
- 1850 Oregon Territorial Legislature
- 1851 Oregon Territorial Legislature
- 1852 Oregon Territorial Legislature
- 1853 Oregon Territorial Legislature
- 1854 Oregon Territorial Legislature
- 1855 Oregon Territorial Legislature
- 1856 Oregon Territorial Legislature
- 1857 Oregon Territorial Legislature
- 1858 Oregon Territorial Legislature

== State legislatures ==
Name	Convened	Adjourned	Last election
1st Oregon Legislative Assembly	September 10, 1860	October 19, 1860	June 1860
2nd Oregon Legislative Assembly	September 8, 1862	October 17, 1862	June 1862
3rd Oregon Legislative Assembly	September 12, 1864	October 22, 1864	June 1864
4th Oregon Legislative Assembly	1866		
5th Oregon Legislative Assembly	1868		
6th Oregon Legislative Assembly	1870		
7th Oregon Legislative Assembly	September 9, 1872		
8th Oregon Legislative Assembly	1874		
9th Oregon Legislative Assembly	1876		
10th Oregon Legislative Assembly	September 9, 1878		
11th Oregon Legislative Assembly	1880		
12th Oregon Legislative Assembly	September 11, 1882		
13th Oregon Legislative Assembly	1885		June 1884
14th Oregon Legislative Assembly	January 10, 1887		
15th Oregon Legislative Assembly	January 14, 1889		June 1888
16th Oregon Legislative Assembly	January 9, 1891		
17th Oregon Legislative Assembly	January 9, 1893		
18th Oregon Legislative Assembly	January 14, 1895		
19th Oregon Legislative Assembly	January 11, 1897		June 1896
20th Oregon Legislative Assembly	January 9, 1899		
21st Oregon Legislative Assembly	January 14, 1901		
22nd Oregon Legislative Assembly	1903		June 1902
23rd Oregon Legislative Assembly	1905		
24th Oregon Legislative Assembly	1907		June 1906
25th Oregon Legislative Assembly	1909		
26th Oregon Legislative Assembly	1911		November 1910 (Note: A 1908 amendment to the Constitution of Oregon specified "the regular general biennial election in Oregon for the year A.D. 1910 and thereafter shall be held on the first Tuesday after the first Monday in November.")
27th Oregon Legislative Assembly	1913		November 1912
28th Oregon Legislative Assembly	1915		November 1914
29th Oregon Legislative Assembly	January 8, 1917		November 1916
30th Oregon Legislative Assembly	1919		November 1918
31st Oregon Legislative Assembly	1921		November 1920
32nd Oregon Legislative Assembly	1923		November 1922
33rd Oregon Legislative Assembly	1925		November 1924
34th Oregon Legislative Assembly	1927		November 1926
35th Oregon Legislative Assembly	January 14, 1929		November 1928
36th Oregon Legislative Assembly	1931		November 1930
37th Oregon Legislative Assembly	1933		November 1932
38th Oregon Legislative Assembly	1935		November 1934
39th Oregon Legislative Assembly	1937		November 1936
40th Oregon Legislative Assembly	1939		November 1938
41st Oregon Legislative Assembly	1941		November 1940
42nd Oregon Legislative Assembly	1942		
43rd Oregon Legislative Assembly	1944		
44th Oregon Legislative Assembly	January 13, 1947		November 1946
45th Oregon Legislative Assembly	1949		November 1948
46th Oregon Legislative Assembly	1951		November 1950
47th Oregon Legislative Assembly	1953		November 1952
48th Oregon Legislative Assembly	1955		November 1954
49th Oregon Legislative Assembly	1957		November 1956
50th Oregon Legislative Assembly	1959		November 4, 1958
51st Oregon Legislative Assembly	January 9, 1961		November 8, 1960
52nd Oregon Legislative Assembly	1963		November 1962
53rd Oregon Legislative Assembly	1965		November 1964
54th Oregon Legislative Assembly	1967		November 8, 1966
55th Oregon Legislative Assembly	1969		November 1968
56th Oregon Legislative Assembly	1971		November 3, 1970
57th Oregon Legislative Assembly	1973		November 1972
58th Oregon Legislative Assembly	1975		November 1974
59th Oregon Legislative Assembly	1977		November 1976
60th Oregon Legislative Assembly	1979		November 1978
61st Oregon Legislative Assembly	1981		November 1980
62nd Oregon Legislative Assembly	1983		November 1982
63rd Oregon Legislative Assembly	1985		November 1984
64th Oregon Legislative Assembly	1987		November 1986
65th Oregon Legislative Assembly	1989		November 1988
66th Oregon Legislative Assembly	1991		November 1990
67th Oregon Legislative Assembly	1993		November 1992
68th Oregon Legislative Assembly	1995		November 1994
69th Oregon Legislative Assembly	1997		November 1996
70th Oregon Legislative Assembly	1999		November 1998
71st Oregon Legislative Assembly	2001		November 2000
72nd Oregon Legislative Assembly	2003		November 2002
73rd Oregon Legislative Assembly	2005		November 2004
74th Oregon Legislative Assembly	2007		November 2006
75th Oregon Legislative Assembly	2009		2008 Oregon legislative election
76th Oregon Legislative Assembly	2011		2010 Oregon legislative election
77th Oregon Legislative Assembly	2013		2012 Oregon legislative election
78th Oregon Legislative Assembly	2015		2016 Oregon legislative election
79th Oregon Legislative Assembly	2017		2018 Oregon legislative election
80th Oregon Legislative Assembly	2019		November 2018
81st Oregon Legislative Assembly	January 11, 2021	March 4, 2022	November 2020: House, Senate
82nd Oregon Legislative Assembly	January 9, 2023		November 2022: House, Senate
83rd Oregon Legislative Assembly	January 21, 2025		November 5, 2024: House, Senate

== See also ==
- List of speakers of the Oregon House of Representatives
- List of presidents of the Oregon State Senate
- List of governors of Oregon
- Politics of Oregon
- Elections in Oregon
- Oregon State Capitol
- Timeline of Oregon history
- Lists of United States state legislative sessions
