= 43rd Oregon Legislative Assembly =

←	42nd Legislative Assembly	44th Legislative Assembly	→
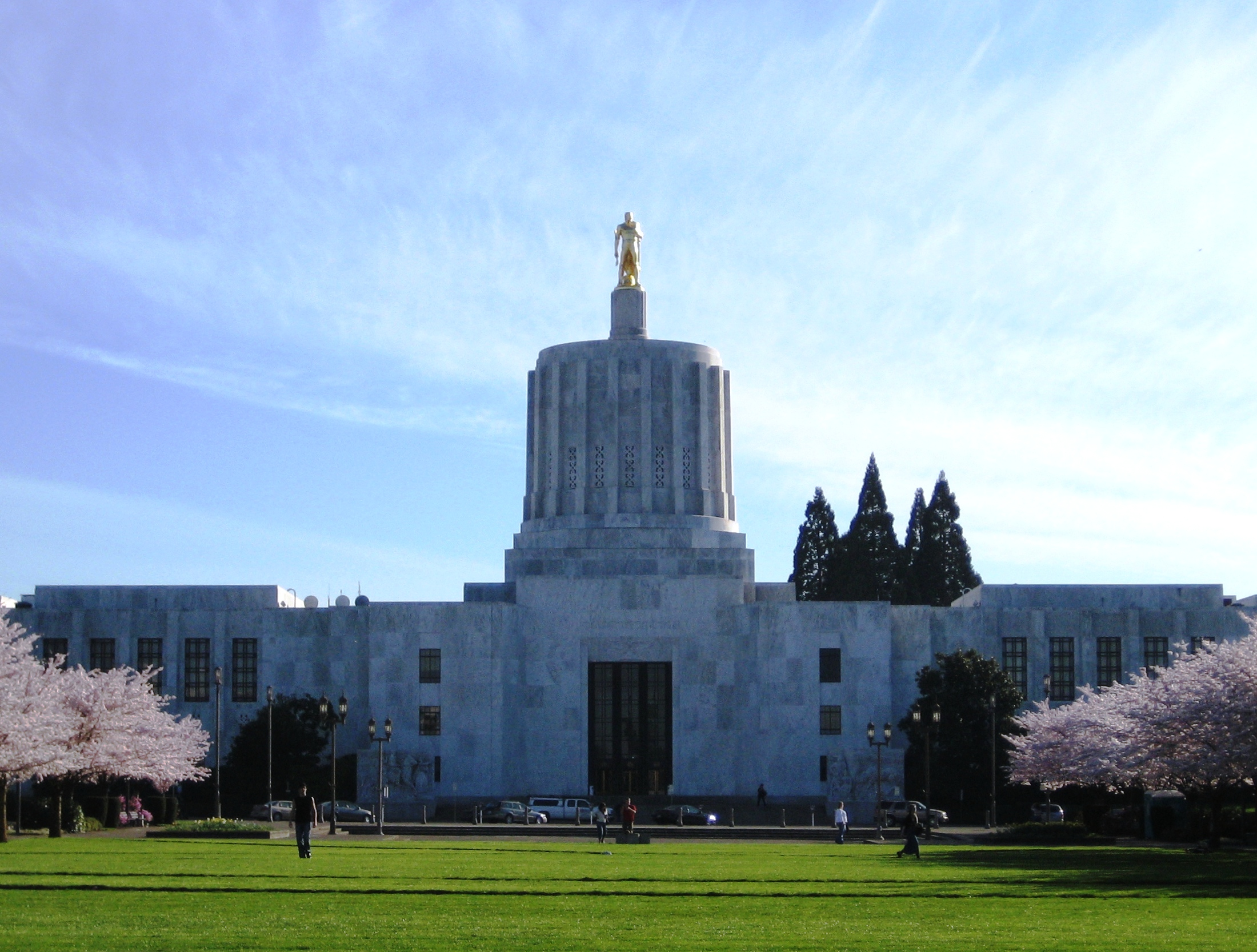
- The legislature took place in the Oregon State Capitol, seen here in 2007

Overview
- Legislative body: Oregon Legislative Assembly
- Jurisdiction: Oregon, United States
- Meeting place: Oregon State Capitol
- Term: 1945
- Website: www.oregonlegislature.gov

Oregon State Senate
- Members: 30 Senators
- Senate President: Howard Belton
- Party control: Republican Party of Oregon

Oregon House of Representatives
- Members: 60 Representatives
- Speaker of the House: Eugene E. Marsh
- Party control: Republican Party of Oregon

The 43rd Oregon Legislative Assembly was the legislative session of the Oregon Legislative Assembly that convened on January 8, 1945 and adjourned March 17. It coincided with World War II.

== Senate ==
Affiliation	Members
Democratic	4
Republican	26
Total	30
Government Majority	22

== Senate Members ==
Composition of the Senate
Senator	Residence	Party
Howard Belton	Canby	Republican
Dr. Joel C. Booth	Lebanon	Republican
William E. Burke	Sherwood	Republican
John H. Carson	Salem	Republican
Merle R. Chessman	Astoria	Republican
Marshall E. Cornett	Klamath Falls	Republican
Rex Ellis	Pendleton	Republican
Carl Engdahl	Pendleton	Republican
Ernest R. Fatland	Condon	Republican
Angus Gibson	Junction City	Republican
Frank H. Hilton	Portland	Republican
James N. Jones	Juntura	Republican
Frederick S. Lamport	Salem	Republican
Thomas R. Mahoney	Portland	Democratic
Coe A. McKenna	Portland	Republican
Dr. William A. Moser	Grants Pass	Democratic
Earl T. Newbry	Ashland	Republican
Thomas Parkinson	Roseburg	Republican
Lee Patterson	Portland	Republican
Paul L. Patterson	Hillsboro	Republican
Walter J. Pearson	Portland	Republican
Irving Rand	Portland	Republican
Peter J. Stadelman	The Dalles	Republican
W. H. Strayer	Baker	Democratic
Dean Walker	Independence	Republican
Lew Wallace	Portland	Democratic
William Walsh	Marshfield	Republican
Halvor C. Wheeler	Dexter	Republican
George P. Winslow	Tillamook	Republican
Charles H. Zurcher	Enterprise	Republican

== House ==
Affiliation	Members
Democratic	5
Republican	55
Total	60
Government Majority	50

== House Members ==
Composition of the House
House Member	Residence	Party
Fred W. Adams	Gold Beach	Republican
E. C. Allen	Portland	Democratic
Jack Bain	Milwaukie	Democratic
Willis Willard Balderree	Grants Pass	Republican
Alex G. Barry	Portland	Republican
O. H. Bengston	Medford	Republican
Robert A. Bennett	Portland	Republican
Phil Brady	Portland	Democratic
Vernon D. Bull	La Grande	Democratic
Ned H. Callaway	Brownsville	Democratic
W. W. Chadwick	Salem	Republican
Truman A. Chase	Eugene	Republican
H. H. Chindgren	Molalla	Republican
E. H. Condit	Clatskanie	Republican
John Dickson	Portland	Republican
Robert E. Duniway	Portland	Republican
Anna M. Ellis	Garibaldi	Republican
Warren Erwin	Portland	Democratic
Carl H. Francis	Dayton	Republican
Giles L. French	Moro	Republican
R. C. Frisbie	Baker	Republican
Robert C. Gile	Roseburg	Republican
M. James Gleason	Portland	Democratic
J. S. Greenwood	Wemme	Republican
John Hubert Hall	Portland	Republican
Joseph E. Harvey	Portland	Republican
Donald E. Heisler	The Dalles	Republican
Fred A. Hellberg	Astoria	Republican
Paul Hendricks	Salem	Republican
H. T. Hesse	Hillsboro	Republican
Carl C. Hill	Days Creek	Republican
Earl H. Hill	Cushman	Republican
Fred Himelwright	Joseph	Republican
J. O. Johnson	Portland	Republican
William T. Johnson	Corvallis	Democratic
H. R. Jones	Salem	Republican
E. W. Kimberling	Prairie City	Republican
E. Riddell Lage	Hood River	Republican
M. M. Landon	Sweet Home	Republican
C. L. Lieuallen	Pendleton	Republican
Art W. Lindberg	Pendleton	Republican
Pat Lonergan	Portland	Republican
Eugene E. Marsh	McMinnville	Republican
A. W. Meyers	Milwaukie	Republican
Ralph T. Moore	Bandon	Republican
William B. Morse	Prineville	Republican
William Niskanen	Bend	Republican
Henry E. Peterson	Ione	Republican
Stanhope S. Pier	Portland	Republican
Rose M. Poole	Klamath Falls	Republican
Henry Semon	Klamath Falls	Democratic
John R. Snellstrom	Eugene	Republican
Burt K. Snyder	Lakeview	Republican
V. B. Staples	Ontario	Republican
John F. Steelhammer	Salem	Republican
Lyle D. Thomas	Dallas	Republican
Frank J. Van Dyke	Medford	Republican
Harvey Wells	Portland	Republican
Joe Wilson	Newport	Republican
Manley J. Wilson	Wauna	Republican
