= 39th Oregon Legislative Assembly =

←	38th Legislative Assembly	40th Legislative Assembly	→
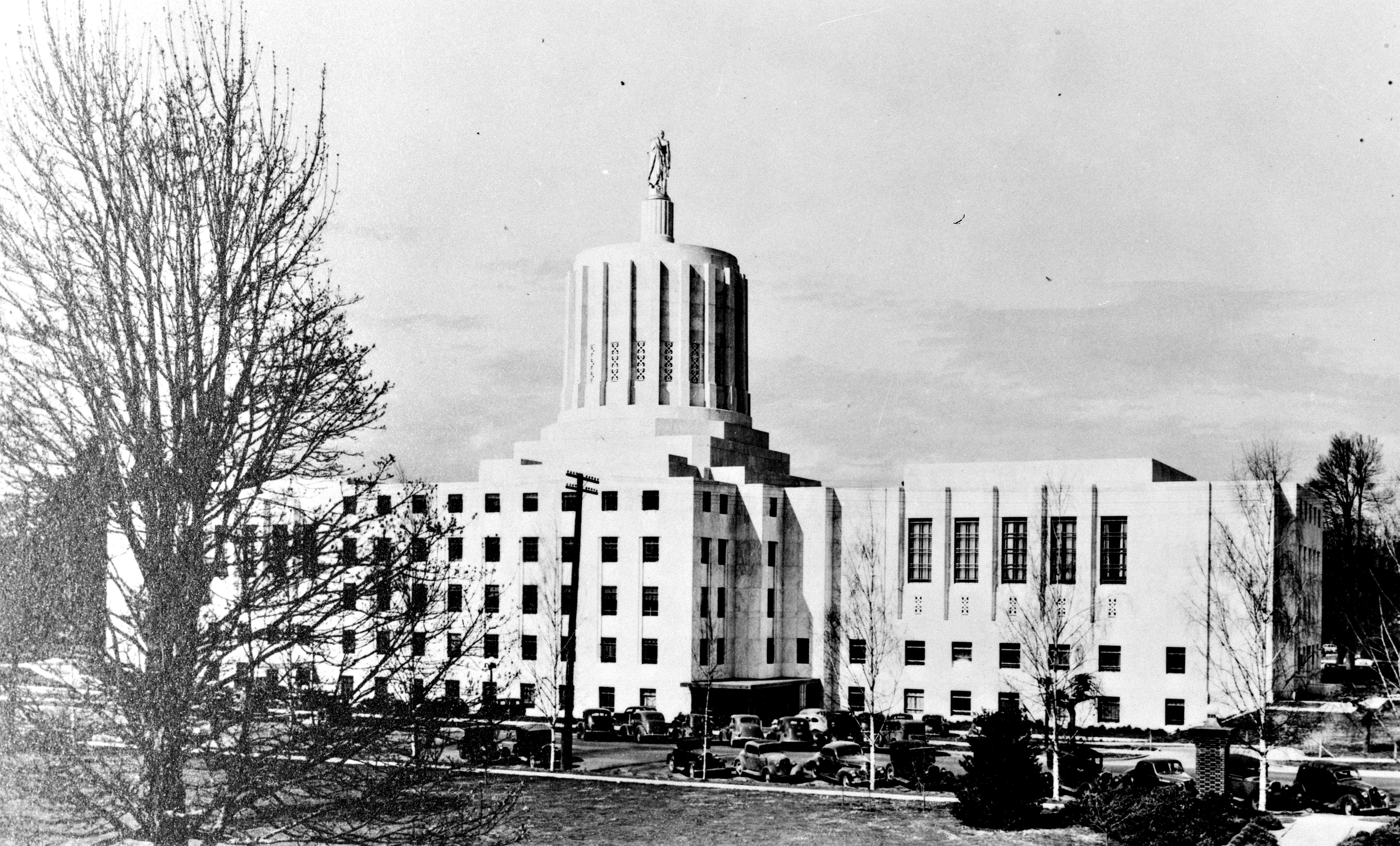
- Backside of the capitol in 1939

Overview
- Legislative body: Oregon Legislative Assembly
- Jurisdiction: Oregon, United States
- Meeting place: Oregon State Capitol
- Term: 1937
- Website: www.oregonlegislature.gov

Oregon State Senate
- Members: 30 Senators
- Senate President: F. M. Franciscovich
- Party control: Republican Party of Oregon

Oregon House of Representatives
- Members: 60 Representatives
- Speaker of the House: Harry D. Boivin
- Party control: Democratic Party of Oregon

The 39th Oregon Legislative Assembly was the legislative session of the Oregon Legislative Assembly that convened on January 11, 1937 and adjourned March 8. It was the first assembly held in the second state capitol after the 1935 fire. The building was still partially damaged, but important parts, like the legislative chambers were ready for use.

== Senate ==
Affiliation	Members
Democratic	12
Republican	16
Total	28
Government Majority	4

== Senate Members ==
Composition of the Senate
Senator	Residence	Party
Homer D. Angell	Portland	Republican
Ulysses S. Balentine	Klamath Falls	Republican
William D. Bennett	Portland	Democratic
Dr. James A. Best	Pendleton	Republican
William E. Burke	Sherwood	Republican
Byron G. Carney	Milwaukie	Democratic
George H. Chaney	Coquille	Democratic
C. W. Clark	Roseburg	Republican
William L. Dickson	Portland	Democratic
Robert M. Duncan	Burns	Republican
George W. Dunn	Ashland	Republican
George T. Eayrs	Portland	Democratic
Rex Ellis	Pendleton	Republican
Frank M. Franciscovich	Astoria	Republican
Thomas P. Graham	Portland	Democratic
Clyde L. Kiddle	LaGrande	Democratic
Dellmore Lessard	Portland	Democratic
Elwin A. McCormack	Eugene	Republican
Douglas McKay	Salem	Republican
Walter E. Pearson	Portland	Democratic
E. Lyman Ross	Aloha	Democratic
Charles K. Spaulding	Salem	Republican
Peter J. Stadelman	The Dalles	Republican
William H. Steiwer	Fossil	Republican
W. H. Strayer	Baker	Democratic
Cortis D. Stringer	Lebanon	Democratic
Dean Walker	Independence	Republican
Halvor C. Wheeler	Goshen	Republican

== House ==
Affiliation	Members
Democratic	39
Republican	20
Independent	1
Total	60

== House Members ==
Composition of the House
House Member	Residence	Party
Noah Ray Alber	Portland	Democratic
E. C. Allen	Portland	Democratic
Ray L. Antrim	Aloha	Democratic
Ellis W. Barnes	Portland	Democratic
R. H. C. Bennett	Newberg	Republican
Daisy B. Bevans	Milwaukie	Democratic
Harry D. Boivin	Klamath Falls	Democratic
Al Boon	Mohler	Democratic
Phil Brady	Portland	Democratic
Vernon D. Bull	La Grande	Democratic
William P. Cady	Portland	Democratic
Roy E. Carter	Gold Beach	Democratic
Fred Dawson	Albany	Democratic
Frank Deich	Portland	Republican
W. B. Duerst	McMinnville	Democratic
James W. Eckersley	Oswego	Democratic
Carl Engdahl	Pendleton	Republican
R. Wayne Erwin	Pendleton	Democratic
A. M. Esson	Portland	Democratic
Ernest R. Fatland	Condon	Republican
Giles L. French	Moro	Republican
George W. Friede	Portland	Democratic
Walter Fuhrer	Salem	Republican
A. S. Grant	Baker	Democratic
Fred E. Harrison	Brownsville	Democratic
Archie K. Higgs	Portland	Democratic
C. T. Hockett	Enterprise	Republican
Russell Hogan	Portland	Democratic
Dr. Jacob Frederick Hosch	Bend	Democratic
J. W. Hughes	Forest Grove	Republican
Clarence F. Hyde	Eugene	Democratic
Fred D. Jeannet	Oswego	Democratic
C. W. E. Jennings	Valley Falls	Democratic
Ronald E. Jones	Brooks	Republican
E. W. Kimberling	Prairie City	Republican
Ralph P. Laird	Creswell	Democratic
Charles H. Leach	Portland	Democratic
Thomas A. Livesley	Salem	Democratic
Grace Kent Magruder	Clatskanie	Democratic
J. T. Mahoney	Siletz	Democratic
Hannah Martin	Salem	Republican
William M. McAllister	Medford	Republican
J. H. McCloskey	Norway	Democratic
W. H. Miller	Grants Pass	Independent
Christina Munroe	Hood River	Democratic
A. Walter Norblad	Astoria	Republican
Delbert A. Norton	Portland	Democratic
O. Henry Olsen	St. Helens	Democratic
Alexander Rennie	Corvallis	Republican
Glenn N. Riddle	Riddle	Republican
Paul E. Roth	Portland	Democratic
Henry Semon	Klamath Falls	Democratic
V. B. Staples	Ontario	Republican
Ralph O. Stephenson	Medford	Democratic
Lyle D. Thomas	West Salem	Republican
Howard W. Turner	Madras	Republican
Jack Wagner	Portland	Democratic
A. Orville Waller	Eugene	Republican
Malcolm W. Wilkinson	The Dalles	Republican
Bernard A. Young	Roseburg	Republican
