= 45th Oregon Legislative Assembly =

←	44th Legislative Assembly	46th Legislative Assembly	→
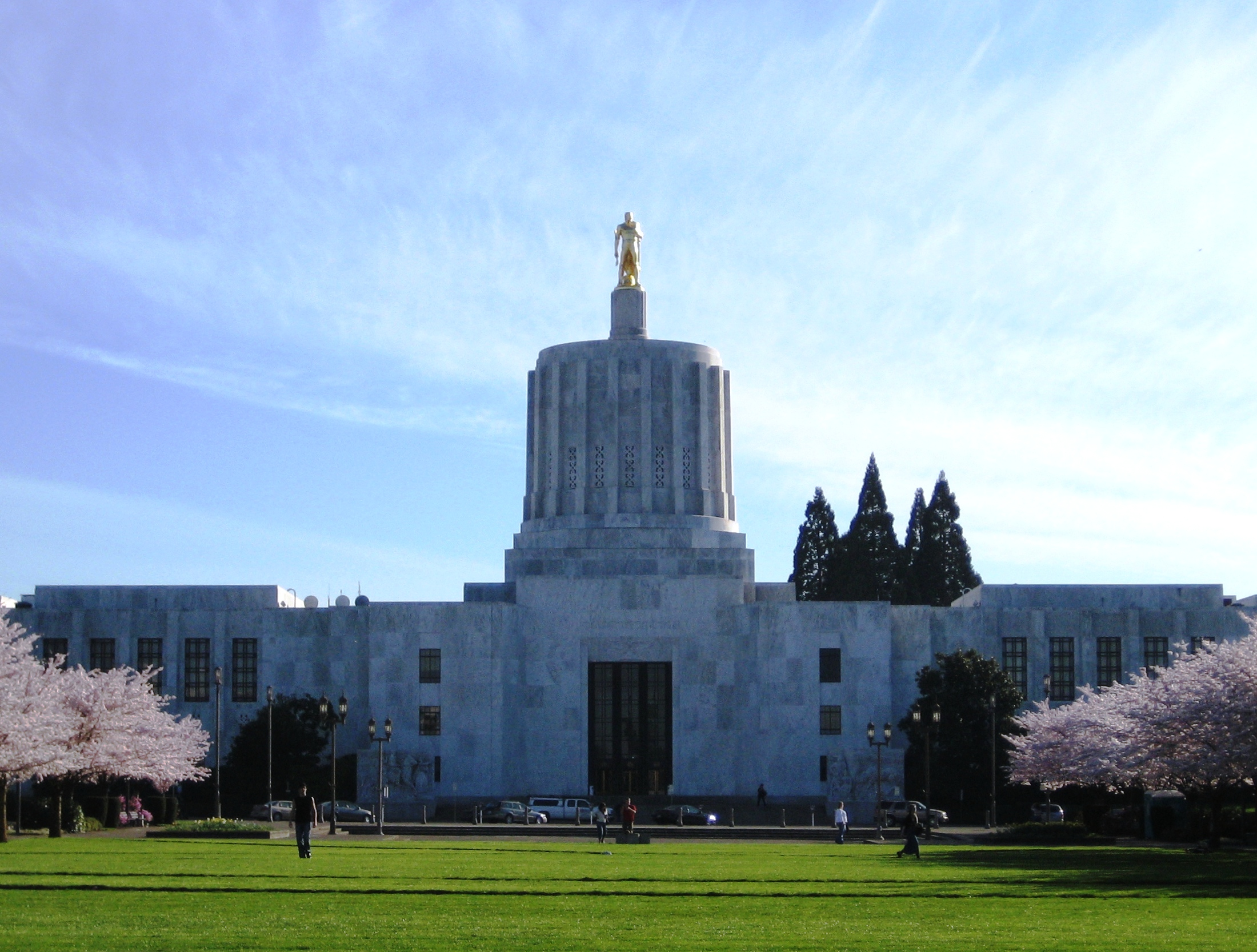
- The legislature took place in the Oregon State Capitol, seen here in 2007

Overview
- Legislative body: Oregon Legislative Assembly
- Jurisdiction: Oregon, United States
- Meeting place: Oregon State Capitol
- Term: 1949
- Website: www.oregonlegislature.gov

Oregon State Senate
- Members: 27 Senators
- Senate President: William E. Walsh
- Party control: Republican Party of Oregon

Oregon House of Representatives
- Members: 60 Representatives
- Speaker of the House: Frank J. Van Dyke
- Party control: Republican Party of Oregon

The 45th Oregon Legislative Assembly was the legislative session of the Oregon Legislative Assembly that convened on January 10, 1949 and adjourned April 16, 1949. One piece of legislation passed this session was the Fair Employment Practices Act, which banned employment discrimination by "race, religion, color, or national origin" by employers with more than five workers and by labor unions. Oregon was the 6th state to pass such a bill.

== Senate ==
Affiliation	Members
Democratic	7
Republican	20
Total	27
Government Majority	13

== Senate Members ==
Composition of the Senate
Senator	Residence	Party
Alex G. Barry	Portland	Republican
Truman A. Chase	Eugene	Republican
Austin Dunn	Baker	Democratic
Rex Ellis	Pendleton	Republican
Carl Engdahl	Pendleton	Republican
Austin F. Flegel	Portland	Democratic
Russell L. Gardner	Newport	Democratic
Angus Gibson	Junction City	Republican
Stewart Hardie	Condon	Republican
Frank H. Hilton	Portland	Republican
Philip S. Hitchcock	Klamath Falls	Republican
Robert D. Holmes	Gearhart	Democratic
Frederick S. Lamport	Salem	Republican
J. J. Lynch	Portland	Republican
Thomas R. Mahoney	Portland	Democratic
Eugene E. Marsh	McMinnville	Republican
William M. McAllister	Medford	Republican
Ben Musa	The Dalles	Democratic
Richard L. Neuberger	Portland	Democratic
Thomas Parkinson	Roseburg	Republican
Paul L. Patterson	Hillsboro	Republican
Irving Rand	Portland	Republican
Elmo Smith	Ontario	Republican
Orval N. Thompson	Albany	Democratic
Dean Walker	Independence	Republican
William Walsh	Coos Bay	Republican
Marie E. Wilcox	Grants Pass	Republican

== House ==
Affiliation	Members
Democratic	8
Republican	52
Total	60
Government Majority	46

== House Members ==
Composition of the House
House Member	Residence	Party
Fred W. Adams	Ophir	Republican
E. C. Allen	Portland	Democratic
Gust Anderson	Portland	Republican
Alex G. Barry	Portland	Republican
David C. Baum	LaGrande	Republican
R. H. C. Bennett	Dundee	Republican
Phil Brady	Portland	Democratic
Sprague Carter	Pendleton	Republican
W. W. Chadwick	Salem	Republican
Herman H. Chindgren	Molalla	Republican
E. H. Condit	Westport	Republican
Raymond C. Coulter	Grants Pass	Republican
Lloyd R. Crosby	Milwaukie	Republican
Ben Day	Gold Hill	Republican
John Dickson	Portland	Republican
Frank A. Doerfler	Salem	Republican
Phil Dreyer	Portland	Democratic
Joseph M. Dyer	Astoria	Republican
Dean B. Erwin	Enterprise	Republican
Earl E. Fisher	Beaverton	Republican
Carl H. Francis	Dayton	Republican
Giles L. French	Moro	Republican
Edward A. Geary	Klamath Falls	Republican
Paul E. Geddes	Roseburg	Republican
Robert C. Gile	Roseburg	Republican
Warren Gill	Lebanon	Republican
J. S. Greenwood	Wemme	Republican
Joseph E. Harvey	Portland	Republican
Herman P. Hendershott	Eugene	Republican
Earl H. Hill	Cushman	Republican
John P. Hounsell	Hood River	Republican
J. O. Johnson	Portland	Republican
E. W. Kimberling	Prairie City	Republican
M. M. Landon	Sweet Home	Republican
C. L. Lieuallen	Pendleton	Republican
John D. Logan	Portland	Republican
Charles K. McColloch	Baker	Democratic
Earl L. McNutt	Eugene	Republican
A. P. Meyers	Redmond	Democratic
James H. Moore	Portland	Democratic
Ralph T. Moore	Coos Bay	Republican
Howard Morgan	Portland	Republican
William B. Morse	Prineville	Democratic
Grace Olivier Peck	Portland	Democratic
Henry E. Peterson	Ione	Republican
William R. Robinson	Portland	Democratic
John I. Sell	The Dalles	Republican
Henry Semon	Klamath Falls	Democratic
Vilas L. Shepard	Clatskanie	Democratic
J. F. Short	Redmond	Republican
John F. Steelhammer	Salem	Republican
A. J. Swett	Tillamook	Republican
Lyle D. Thomas	Dallas	Republican
Frank J. Van Dyke	Medford	Republican
Gerald Wade	Newport	Republican
Harvey Wells	Portland	Republican
Rudie Wilhelm	Portland	Republican
Vernon Wilson	Vale	Republican
Douglas R. Yeater	Salem	Republican
Francis W. Ziegler	Corvallis	Republican
