= 38th Oregon Legislative Assembly =

←	37th Legislative Assembly	39th Legislative Assembly	→
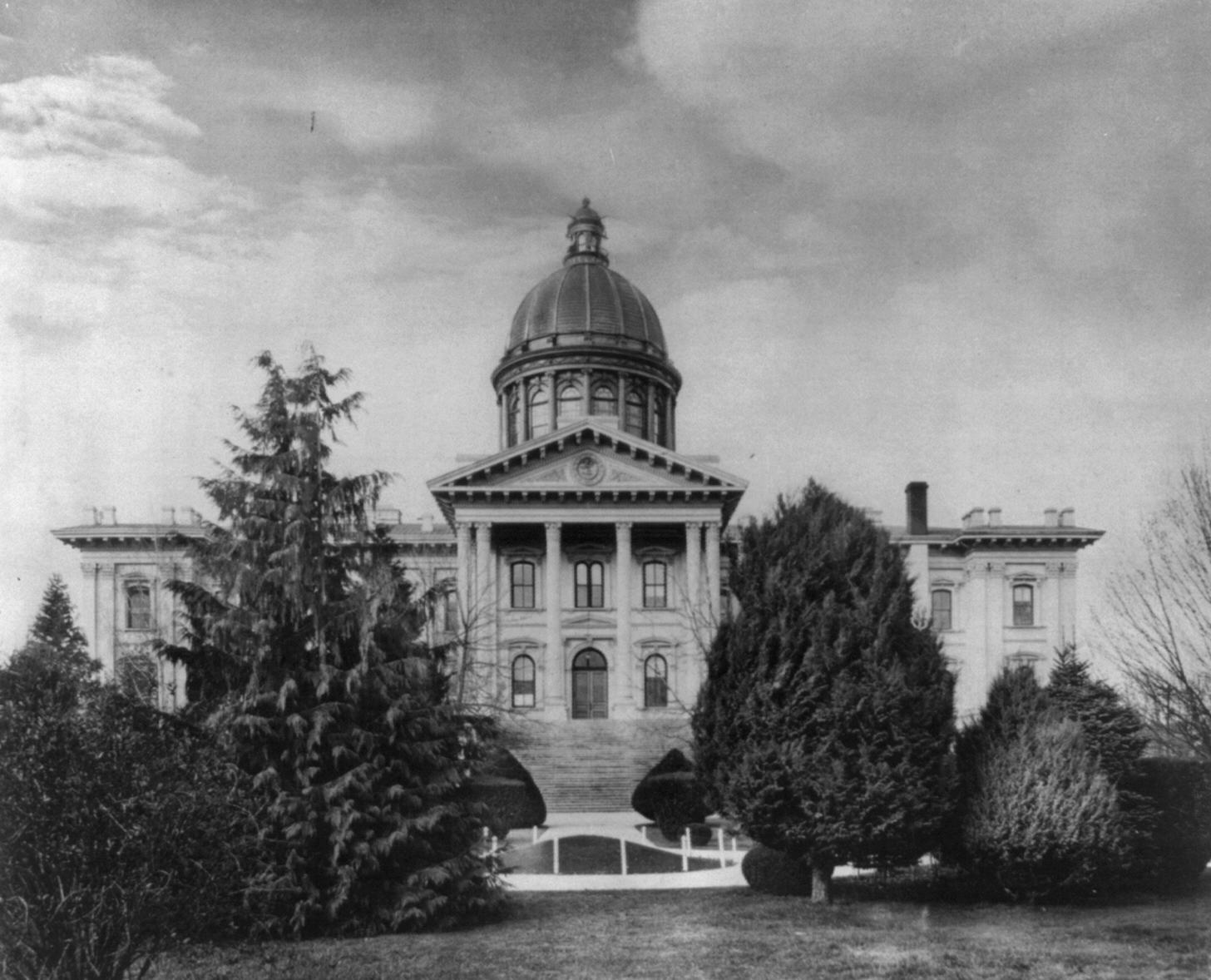
- The legislature took place in the second Oregon State Capitol, seen here in 1909

Overview
- Legislative body: Oregon Legislative Assembly
- Jurisdiction: Oregon, United States
- Meeting place: Oregon State Capitol
- Term: 1935
- Website: www.oregonlegislature.gov

Oregon State Senate
- Members: 30 Senators
- Senate President: Henry L. Corbett (R)
- Party control: Republican Party of Oregon

Oregon House of Representatives
- Members: 60 Representatives
- Speaker of the House: John E. Cooter (D)
- Party control: Democratic Party of Oregon

The 38th Oregon Legislative Assembly was the legislative session of the Oregon Legislative Assembly that convened on January 14, 1935 and adjourned March 13. There was a special session from October 21 to November 9. In the evening of April 25, a fire broke out in the capitol and burned the capitol to the ground, after the session was concluded. The 38th Assembly was the last convened in the second Capitol, which was built in 1876.

== Senate ==
Affiliation	Members
Democratic	12
Republican	17
Total	30
Government Majority	5

== Senate Members ==
Composition of the Senate
Senator	Residence	Party
George M. Aitken	Garden Home	Democratic
Jack E. Allen	Pendleton	Democratic
Dr. James A. Best	Pendleton	Republican
William E. Burke	Sherwood	Republican
Allan A. Bynon	Portland	Republican
Byron G. Carney	Milwaukie	Democratic
James T. Chinnock	Grants Pass	Republican
Henry L. Corbett	Portland	Republican
Ashby C. Dickson	Portland	Democratic
Robert M. Duncan	Burns	Republican
George W. Dunn	Ashland	Republican
Walter S. Fisher	Roseburg	Democratic
Frank M. Franciscovich	Astoria	Republican
John D. Goss	Marshfield (now Coos Bay)	Democratic
James H. Hazlett	Hood River	Democratic
Henry L. Hess	La Grande	Democratic
Dorothy McCullough Lee	Portland	Republican
Dellmore Lessard	Portland	Democratic
Elwin A. McCornack	Eugene	Republican
Douglas McKay	Salem	Republican
Walter E. Pearson	Portland	Democratic
Charles K. Spaulding	Salem	Republican
Isaac E. Staples	Portland	Republican
William H. Steiwer	Fossil	Republican
W. H. Strayer	Baker	Democratic
Cortis D. Stringer	Lebanon	Democratic
Dean Walker	Independence	Republican
N. G. Wallace	Bend	Democratic
Halvor C. Wheeler	Goshen	Republican
Peter C. Zimmerman	Yamhill	Republican

== House ==
Affiliation	Members
Democratic	38
Republican	22
Total	60
Government Majority	16

== House Members ==
Composition of the House
House Member	Residence	Party
Noah Ray Alber	Portland	Democratic
Homer D. Angell	Portland	Republican
Ellis W. Barnes	Portland	Democratic
Harry D. Boivin	Klamath Falls	Democratic
Vernon D. Bull	La Grande	Republican
Roy E. Carter	Gold Beach	Democratic
J. R. Caufield	Tillamook	Democratic
John E. Cooter (Note: Cooter resigned May 7 for health related reasons; J.J. Tobin replaced him on October 14.)	Toledo	Democratic
J. J. Tobin	Toledo	Democratic
William L. Dickson	Portland	Democratic
W. B. Duerst	McMinnville	Democratic
James W. Eckersley	Oswego	Democratic
Carl Engdahl	Pendleton	Republican
Warren Erwin	Portland	Democratic
Ernest R. Fatland	Condon	Republican
Harry Frazer	Molalla	Democratic
Walter Fuhrer	Salem	Republican
Romeo Gouley	Brooks	Democratic
William L. Graham	Portland	Democratic
C. P. Haight	Canyon City	Democratic
Moore Hamilton	Medford	Democratic
Fred E. Harrison	Brownsville	Democratic
Earl H. Hill	Cushman	Republican
M. M. Hill	Hood River	Democratic
C. T. Hockett	Enterprise	Republican
Nan Wood Honeyman	Portland	Democratic
Dr. Jacob Frederick Hosch	Bend	Republican
J. W. Hughes	Forest Grove	Republican
Clarence F. Hyde	Eugene	Democratic
William L. Johnson (Note: William L. Johnson Jr. resigned on August 15, 1935 for health reasons. Harvey Wells succeeded him on August 18.)	Portland	Democratic
Harvey Wells	Portland	Democratic
W. A. Johnson	Grants Pass	Republican
Ronald E. Jones	Brooks	Republican
E. W. Kirkpatrick	Milwaukie	Democratic
William W. Knight (Note: William W. Knight resigned on August 15, 1935 and was reappointed by the Board of Commissioners on August 23.)	Roseburg	Republican
Roscoe Krier	The Dalles	Democratic
Howard Latourette	Portland	Democratic
Charles H. Leach	Portland	Democratic
Paul Lynch (Note: Paul Lynch resigned July 1, 1935. Giles French was appointed to his seat by the Board of Commissioners on July 15.)	Mitchell	Democratic
Grace Kent Magruder	Clatskanie	Democratic
Hannah Martin	Salem	Republican
J. H. McCloskey	Norway	Democratic
Howard S. Merriam (Note: Howard S. Merriam was recalled in a March 18, 1935 special election. J.A. McKevitt was appointed by the Board of Commissioners on March 30.)	Goshen	Republican
J. A. McKevitt	Goshen	Republican
T. W. Munyan	Lebanon	Democratic
Victor J. Nelson	Portland	Democratic
A. Walter Norblad	Astoria	Republican
Delbert A. Norton	Portland	Democratic
O. Henry Olsen	St. Helens	Democratic
W. R. Osborne	Amity	Republican
William C. Rankin	Portland	Democratic
A. Rennie	Corvallis	Republican
Glenn N. Riddle	Riddle	Republican
Millard D. Rodman (Note: Millard D. Rodman resigned on February 24, 1936. Howard W. Turner succeeded him on March 4, 1936)	Culver	Democratic
Howard W. Turner	Madras	Democratic
E. L. Ross	Hillsboro	Democratic
James H. E. Scott (Note: James H. E. Scott died in 1936. C. D. Hobbs succeeded him on May 27, 1936.)	Milton	Republican
C. D. Hobbs	Milton	Republican
Henry Semon	Klamath Falls	Democratic
J. Richard Smurthwaite Jr. (Note: J. Richard Smurthwaite Jr. resigned August 2, 1935. A. S. Grant was appointed by the Board of Commissioners on August 12 to succeed him.)	Baker	Democratic
A. S. Grant	Baker	Democratic
Warner B. Snider	Paisley	Republican
V. B. Staples	Ontario	Republican
Glenn O. Taylor	Medford	Republican
Lyle D. Thomas	Salem	Republican
Lew Wallace (Note: Lew Wallace resigned in May 1936 due to ill health. Robert S. Farrell Jr. succeeded him on September 18, 1936.)	Portland	Democratic
Robert S. Farrell Jr.	Portland	Republican
