= Frank J. Van Dyke =

American politician, attorney, and magistrate judge

- Oregon state legislator Frank Van Dyke, 1948

44th Speaker of the Oregon House of Representatives
- In office 1949–1950
- Preceded by: John Hubert Hall
- Succeeded by: John F. Steelhammer

Member of the Oregon House of Representatives from the 19th district
- In office 1943–1950
- Preceded by: Fred C. Homes
- Succeeded by: Edward H. Mann

Personal details
- Born: August 10, 1907 Penang, Straits Settlements, British Malaya
- Died: December 25, 1988 (aged 81) Jackson County, Oregon, US
- Party: Republican
- Spouse(s): Naomi Holman; Gladys Roberts
- Education: Willamette University
- Profession: Attorney

Frank Jackson Van Dyke (August 10, 1907 – December 25, 1988) was an American politician, attorney, and a United States magistrate judge from the state of Oregon. He was a Republican who served eight years in the Oregon House of Representatives, where he represented a district in southern Oregon. He served as Speaker of the Oregon House of Representatives during the 1949 legislative session. He was elected speaker by a unanimous vote of House members. Later, he served as chairman of the Oregon Board of Higher Education, chairman of the Western Interstate Commission for Higher Education, and chairman of the Oregon State Board of Education. He also served as a federal magistrate for 27 years.

== Early life ==
Van Dyke was born on August 10, 1907, in Penang, Straits Settlements, British Malaya (now Malaysia). He was the son of Benjamin F. Van Dyke and Esther (Jackson) Van Dyke. His parents were Methodist missionaries serving in Singapore and British Malaya. In 1912, Van Dyke moved with his parents back to his father's hometown of Medford, Oregon. He attended public schools and then high school in Medford, graduating from Medford High School in 1926.

Van Dyke went on to college at the Willamette University. As a student, Van Dyke was very active in college life. He was the editor and business manager for the 1928-29 yearbook. His junior year, he was elected class representative on the college's student body executive committee. He was also elected president of Alpha Psi Delta fraternity that year. Van Dyke was on the university track team for four years, specializing in the mile and two-mile running events. He earned a varsity track letter during three of those seasons. He graduated from Willamette University with a law degree in 1931.

== Attorney and community leader ==
After graduating from college, Van Dyke returned to Medford. In 1932, he was admitted to the Oregon State Bar and joined an established Medford law firm. A year later, he took a position in the nearby city of Ashland. His new associate position was with the Briggs and Briggs law firm. It included both private clients and work as Ashland's city attorney. In 1934, Van Dyke open his own law office in Ashland while continuing to serve as Ashland's city attorney.

In addition, Van Dyke was active in a number of civic and fraternal organizations. For example, he was president and director of the Ashland chamber of commerce and chairman of the Ashland school board. He was also a member the local Rotary Club, American Legion, and chairman of the district Boy Scout council. He was president of the local Elks lodge and president of the Jackson County Shriners organization as well as a Mason. Van Dyke was also president of the Ashland Republican Club and president of the Lincoln Club of Jackson County, a group that supported Republican candidates.

Van Dyke married Naomi Hohman in Ashland on June 10, 1934. Together, they had two children, a son and a daughter. Van Dyke was divorced from his first wife in 1957. He later married Gladys Roberts and remained married to her for the rest of his life.

In 1941, Van Dyke became the local coordinator for a United States Army cantonment being developed in Jackson County, north of Medford. In that capacity, he represented Jackson County communities and local businesses as the Army planned a new military training installation. Van Dyke worked with the Army Corps of Engineers and the Quartermaster Corps as they developed what became Camp White.

== State representative ==
In 1942, Van Dyke decided to run for a District 19 seat the Oregon House of Representatives, representing Jackson County. While William M. McAllister of Medford also filed as a Republican, no Democrats joined the race. Because there were two seats in House District 19, political parties were able to nominate two candidates in the primary election so both Van Dyke and McAllister were advanced to the general election. Since there were no Democrats in the field, Van Dyke and McAllister won the two District 19 seats in the general election.

However, Van Dyke had volunteered for service in the Army in early 1942. In the fall, he was called up for duty and sent to Camp Roberts in California for officer training. This meant he was not available to take his seat when the legislative session opened on January 11, 1943.

Oregon law gave Jackson County commissioners the responsibility of filling Van Dyke's seat. They appointed Republican Fred C. Homes to serve as representative pro tem until Van Dyke was available to take his seat in the legislature. In late January 1943, the Army discharged Van Dyke due to a knee injury. Homes served in the Oregon House from the opening of the session through February 4. Van Dyke was sworn in as a state representative by Chief Justice John O. Bailey on February 5, 1943. After being sworn in, Speaker of the House William McAllister appointed Van Dyke to the revision of law, public institutions, administration and reorganization, health and public morals, irrigation, and mining committees. He served until the end of the session, which was adjourned on March 10.

In 1944, Van Dyke announced his decision to run for re-election in House District 19. When Van Dyke filed for the nomination, he was joined by two other Republican candidates, O. H. Bengtson and Robert F. Kyle, both of Medford. No Democrats filed in District 19. Van Dyke and Bengtson won the Republican nominations for the two District 19 seats. Van Dyke also won the Democratic primary with 63 write-in votes. Since there were no Democrats nominated, the two Republicans were unopposed in the general election.

Van Dyke took his seat in the Oregon House on January 8, 1945, representing District 19. He served through the 1945 regular legislative session which ended on March 17. During the session, Van Dyke was appointed chairman of utilities committee. He was also a member of counties and cities, judiciary, military affairs, mining, and post-war planning committees. As chairman of utilities committee, Van Dyke beat back an initiative to increase state taxes on municipal power companies from three to nine percent.

In 1946, Van Dyke decided to run for another two-year term in the Oregon House, representing Jackson County in District 19. Fellow Republican incumbent O. H. Bengtson also filed for re-election in District 19. Van Dyke and Bengtson were the only candidates in Republicans primary while no Democrats filed for the District 19 seats. Van Dyke and Bengtson not only won the Republican primary; they also won the Democratic primary with write-in votes so they are unopposed in general election.

Van Dyke took his seat in the Oregon House on January 13, 1947, representing District 19. When the House was organized, Van Dyke had the honor of nominating John H. Hall for speaker. After Hall was unanimously elected speaker, he appointed Van Dyke to the judiciary, assessment and taxation, roads and highways, rules, and resolutions committees. He served on these committees throughout the regular 1947 legislative session which ended on April 5. Even before the 1947 legislative session ended, Van Dyke had lined up enough support to be elected House speaker in the 1949 session, assuming his supporters were re-elected and the Republicans remained in control of the House.

== Speaker of the House ==
During the legislative Interim, Van Dyke continued his Jackson County law practice. By that time, his law firm, Van Dyke and Lombard, had offices in both Ashland and Medford. Shortly after the 1947 legislative session ended, he was elected president of Southern Oregon Bar Association. Early the next year, he moved his family from Ashland to Medford where he grew up.

In early 1948, Van Dyke announces his re-election bid. Two other Republicans, Ben Day and Edward H. Mann, filed for the District 19 seats along with two Democrats, Marie M. Bosworth and J. P. Graham. Van Dyke and Day were nominated in the Republican primary while Bosworth and Graham were endorsed in the Democratic primary. Van Dyke and Day won the two District 19 seats in general election. Day received 6,735 votes; Van Dyke was second with 6,466 votes; Bosworth was third with 4,994 followed by Graham with 3,150 votes.

After the general election, Van Dyke consolidated his support for the House speaker position. He had 40 committed supporters as early as June while only 31 were required to win the speakership. After the November election, the remaining Republicans fell in line and declared their support for Van Dyke. Even the House Democrats, offered their support.

The 1949 legislative session opened on January 10. When the House was organized, Van Dyke was unanimously elected speaker. The following day, he made the House committee appointments. It proved to be a busy session with 52 House bills introduced in the first four days of the session. During the session, legislative action was slow. By mid-February neither chamber of the legislature had pass a major bill and Governor Douglas McKay began daily meetings with Van Dyke and the Senate President William E. Walsh to help speed up the legislative processes. The primary holdup was a complex tax plan.

In the end, the tax plan was approved, and the legislature was able to pass a balanced budget without raising taxes. This included funding of a robust highway construction program. The budget also financed a reformed public welfare program, an unemployment compensation bill, and provided additional funds for Oregon's veteran home loan program. The legislative session finally came to an end on April 16. At 97 days, it was the longest legislative session in Oregon history. During the session, a total of 996 bills were introduced along with 151 resolutions, a very heavy workload for a single legislative session.

After the 1949 legislative session ended, Van Dyke and Senate President Walsh appointed selected legislators to several special interim committees to study important issues and make recommendations to the 1951 legislature. One of interim study groups focused on the state's public assistance program including the state's old age pension system. Another interim committee was tasked with studying the state's tax structure and recommend tax reforms. A third interim committee was directed to look at the entire state government organization to identify opportunities for consolidation or elimination of state agencies, boards, and commissions. Van Dyke later joined this study group. All three interim groups were directed to delivery their recommendations to the 1951 legislature for follow-up action.

In June 1949, Governor McKay appointed Van Dyke to a special council of experts to study Oregon's legal statutes and identify recommended changes. The group was directed to report recommendation for 1951 legislature for action.

In the latter part of his two-year term as House speaker, Van Dyke served as acting governor for one day. In Oregon at that time, whenever the governor left the state, the state senate's president became acting governor. If both the governor and senate president were out of state at the same time, the Speaker of the House stepped in as acting governor. That circumstance occurred on June 16, 1950, when Governor McKay and Senate President Walsh were both out of the state, leaving Van Dyke as acting governor for that one day.

Van Dyke decided not to run for re-election in 1950. He did not publicly disclose his rationale for the decision. However, as he was leaving the legislature in December 1950, Governor McKay appointed him to the Oregon Board of Higher Education. The position was a vacancy with a term ending in March 1953.

== Post-legislative career ==
Having left the legislature at the end of 1950, Van Dyke returned to his southern Oregon law practice and his many community interests in Ashland and Medford. In addition to his legal work for private clients, he handled case for business interests and local governments. For example, he represented logging and trucking companies in their bid to get the legislature to allow logging trucks to exceed highway weight limits. He also represents Jackson County when it was seeking a greater share of state railroad taxes. In 1954, Van Dyke was named to the Oregon Bar Association board of governors. He served three one-year terms on the board. During his third term, he was the board's vice president.

While maintaining his private law practice, Van Dyke also served as a part-time federal magistrate. He began his career as a judge in 1954 when he was appointed United States commissioner (magistrate judge) for Crater Lake National Park. This was a federal judicial position with authority to over misdemeanors committed in the national park, which was a federal jurisdiction. When he was first appointed most of his cases dealt with hunting violations. However, over the year, his judicial powers were expanded to include authority over a broad range of federal crimes including preliminary hearings on cases brought by the Federal Bureau of Investigation. He remained a federal magistrate for the next 27 years, finally retiring in 1981.

Van Dyke continued to contribute his leadership to local civic groups for many years. He was elected president of Medford YMCA in 1951 and then re-elected in 1952. In 1953, he was elected president of Medford's Rotary Club. Van Dyke was elected president of the Crater Lake Natural History Association in 1961 and then re-elected to that position in 1963. During this period, he also served on the board of director for the local Salvation Army chapter and Medford's Providence Hospital board of directors.

Van Dyke continued to work on state boards and commissions as well. In 1953, Van Dyke finished his term on the state's board of higher education. The following year, Governor Paul L. Patterson appointed Van Dyke to serve as Oregon's representative on the Western Interstate Commission for Higher Education, a group responsible for developing cooperative education agreements between state colleges in the Western United States. He became vice chairman of the commission in 1956 and then chairman in 1957. In 1958, Governor Robert D. Holmes re-appointed him to second four-year term on the commission. He remained on the commission until 1971.

In 1968, Governor Tom McCall appointed Van Dyke to a seven-year term on the State Board of Education. He became board chairman in 1971. Two years later, President Richard M. Nixon appointed him to the National Advisory Council on Extension and Continuing Education. In 1972, the Oregon Education Association named Van Dyke, Education Citizen of the Year. The following year, Willamette University honored Van Dyke with an alumni citation for his outstanding service and support of higher education. Finally, Governor Victor Atiyeh appointed Van Dyke to the Oregon Board of Examiners of Nursing Home Administrators in 1979.

== Death and legacy ==
Van Dyke died on December 25, 1988, at his home in Jackson County, Oregon. He was buried at Siskiyou Memorial Park in Medford.

On March 8, 1989, the Oregon House of Representative passed a memorial resolution honoring Van Dyke and his service to the state of Oregon. The Oregon State Senate passed its memorial tribute to Van Dyke on April 3, 1989.

Today, the Southern Oregon Historical Society in Medford maintains an oral history file recorded by Van Dyke in 1983. It covers his family history, experiences at Willamette University, legal and legislative careers, community involvements in Ashland and Medford, personal thoughts about state and local government, and his work with the Western Interstates Commission on Higher Education.
