= Harris Ellsworth =

American politician

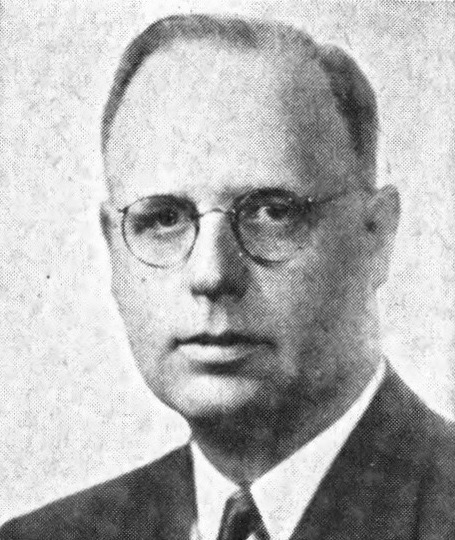
- Congressman Ellsworth in 1953

Chair of the United States Civil Service Commission
- In office April 18, 1957 – February 28, 1959
- Appointed by: Dwight D. Eisenhower
- Preceded by: Philip Young
- Succeeded by: Roger W. Jones

Member of the U.S. House of Representatives from Oregon's 4th district
- In office January 3, 1943 – January 3, 1957
- Preceded by: District established
- Succeeded by: Charles O. Porter

Member of the Oregon Senate
- In office March 15, 1941

Personal details
- Born: Mathew Harris Ellsworth; September 17, 1899 Hoquiam, Washington, U.S.
- Died: February 7, 1986 (aged 86) Albuquerque, New Mexico, U.S.
- Resting place: Gate of Heaven Cemetery, Albuquerque
- Party: Republican
- Occupation: Journalist

Mathew Harris Ellsworth (September 17, 1899 – February 7, 1986) was an American newspaperman and politician who served six terms as a Republican U.S. congressman from Oregon from 1943 to 1957. He subsequently served as chairman of the United States Civil Service Commission. Prior to serving in the United States House of Representatives, Ellsworth had served for one day in the Oregon Senate in the 41st Oregon Legislative Assembly.

== Early life ==
Born in Hoquiam, Washington, Ellsworth moved together with his parents to Eugene, Oregon, and later to nearby Wendling, where he attended public schools. In 1922, he graduated with a journalism degree from the University of Oregon. He worked in the newspaper and lumber industries in the 1920s, and was an associate professor of journalism at the University of Oregon in 1928 and 1929. While serving as manager of the Oregon State Editorial Association (now the Oregon Newspaper Publishers Association), in 1929, he purchased an interest in The Roseburg News-Review, eventually becoming its editor and publisher. Ellsworth helped to bring a Veteran's Administration hospital to Roseburg, which provided construction jobs to the area hard-hit by the Great Depression. In 1936, he was instrumental in bringing KRNR radio on the air, one of Oregon's first radio stations based outside of Portland.

== Political career ==
In 1941, Ellsworth was appointed to the Oregon State Senate on March 15, the last day of the session to replace C. W. Clark, who died 5 days prior, thus serving only one day.

=== Congress ===
In 1942, Ellsworth was elected to the United States House of Representatives, representing Oregon's 4th congressional district, which had just been established after the 1940 census. He served seven terms, and sat on the House Appropriations Committee and House Rules Committee. In the 1956 election, he was narrowly defeated by Democrat Charles O. Porter, whom Ellsworth had defeated two years earlier.

=== Eisenhower administration ===
After losing the election, Ellsworth was appointed by President Eisenhower to a two-year term as chairman of the United States Civil Service Commission, serving from April 18, 1957 until resigning on February 28, 1959.

== After Congress ==
Ellsworth left politics and resumed his newspaper business and became a real estate broker. He retired to Albuquerque, New Mexico in the 1970s.

=== Death and burial ===
Harris Ellsworth died on February 7, 1986. He was interred at Gate of Heaven Cemetery, Albuquerque.

U.S. House of Representatives
New district	Member of the U.S. House of Representatives from Oregon's 4th congressional district 1943–1957	Succeeded by Charles O. Porter
