= Chester E. McCarty =

American politician

General Chester E. McCarty
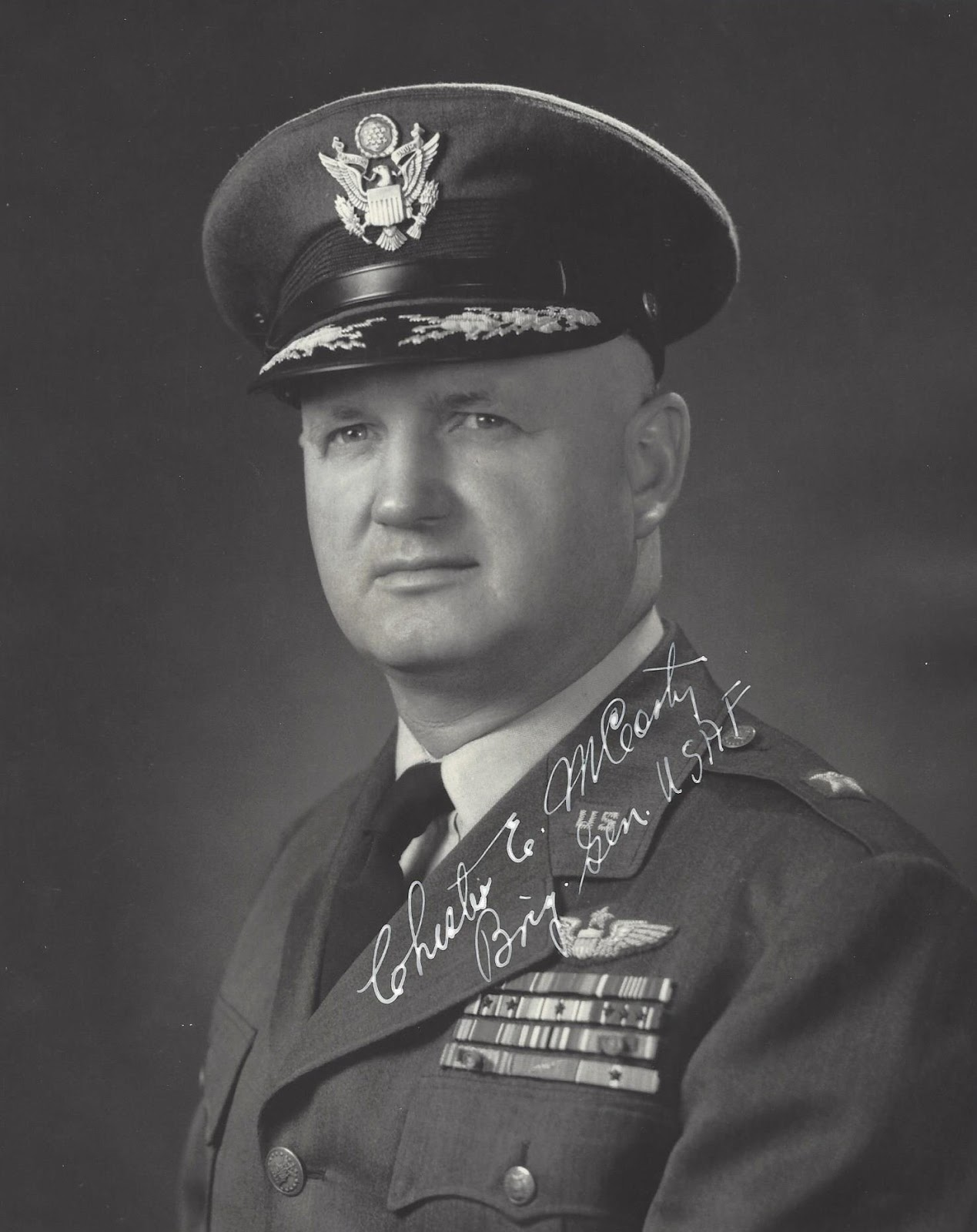
- A signed photo of Major General Chester E. McCarty
- Born: December 31, 1905; Pendleton, Oregon
- Died: April 5, 1999 (aged 93)
- Buried: Arlington National Cemetery
- Allegiance: United States of America
- Branch: United States Air Force
- Service years: 1942-1960

Major General Chester E. McCarty (December 31, 1905 – April 5, 1999) was an officer and pilot in the United States Air Force who served as chief of staff for U.S. Air Forces in Europe in February 1963. He came to Germany from Headquarters U.S. Air Force, Washington, D.C., where he served an assistant chief of staff for Reserve Forces. He also held political offices in Oregon.

McCarty directed an important airlift of supplies during the Korean War and was the first Air Force pilot to fly over the South Pole.

== Early life ==
McCarty was born in 1905 in Pendleton, Oregon, and graduated from Northwestern College of Law in Portland, Oregon in 1929. Active in the Oregon National Guard for many years, he advanced from an Infantry private to battery commander of Artillery, holding all enlisted ranks through master sergeant. His reserve commissioned status dates from 1926.

== Political career ==
Assistant attorney general of Oregon from 1930 to 1936, McCarty was elected to the Oregon State Senate in 1942. However, he declined to serve because he was called to active duty as a captain in the United States Army Air Corps.

== Military career ==
During World War II, McCarty served as squadron commander and operations officer at Morrison Field in Palm Beach, Florida and at Borinquen Field in Aguadilla, Puerto Rico. He was a staff officer with the North African Wing of the Air Transport Command, and later, commander of a chain of air bases in the Middle East. On his return to the United States in 1945, McCarty commanded the "brass hat" transport group at Washington National Airport.

Returning to civilian life in 1946, McCarty resumed practice as head of a Portland law firm, and became active in the Air Force Reserve as commander of the 305th Air Division and later of the 403d Troop Carrier Wing. He was national president of the Air Reserve Association from 1949 to 1950.

McCarty was recalled to active duty in 1951 during the Korean War as commander of the 403d Troop Carrier Wing, and flew combat airlift missions in Korea. In 1952, when the 403d Wing deployed to the Far East, McCarty assumed command of the 315th Air Division (Combat Cargo) in Japan and directed the Korean Airlift.

In 1953 and 1954, McCarty commanded U.S. Air Force airlift operations in support of the French Army during the First Indochina War. This mission included massive airdrops during the siege of Dien Bien Phu.

Returning to the United States in 1954, McCarty became commander of Tactical Air Command's Eighteenth Air Force at Donaldson Air Force Base in South Carolina. He flew many of the C-124 Globemaster airlift mission's which built the Dewline in the Arctic in 1955 through more than 700 landings on frozen lakes and bays from Alaska to Baffinland, and directed TAC airlift operations throughout the world with a fleet of C-124s, Lockheed C-130 Hercules and Fairchild C-123 Providers.

McCarty was pilot of the first Air Force plane to fly over the South Pole on October 26, 1956, airdropping the first load of buildings, supplies and equipment for the base at the South Pole on Operation Deep Freeze.

From 1957 to 1959, McCarty commanded Tactical Air Command's Twelfth Air Force at Waco, Texas, the world's first all supersonic force. In 1958, be deployed a major TAC composite air strike force to the Far East during the Formosa Straits crisis, many of the force of jet fighter, bomber and reconnaissance aircraft crossing the Pacific in less than 17 hours flying time by air-to-air refueling.

McCarty assumed command of the Fourteenth Air Force at Robins Air Force Base, Ga., in October 1959 after five years as a TAC Air Force commander. A year later the unit was discontinued as part of a general reorganization of the Continental Air Command and McCarty assumed his Pentagon position.

McCarty was a command pilot with more than 12,000 flying hours, including 469 hours of combat time. He had flown almost every type of Air Force aircraft, including the North American F-100 Super Sabre and Lockheed F-104 Starfighter jet fighters, and has piloted many types of airlines jet aircraft.

== Death and legacy ==
McCarty died on April 5, 1999.
