= Norway, Oregon =

Unincorporated community in the state of Oregon, United States

- Unincorporated community
- Location within the state of Oregon Norway (the United States)
- Coordinates: 43°06′03″N 124°09′24″W
- Country: United States
- State: Oregon
- County: Coos
- Elevation: 52 ft (16 m)
- Time zone: UTC−08:00 (Pacific (PST))
  - Summer (DST): UTC−07:00 (PDT)
- GNIS feature ID: 1136583

Norway is an unincorporated community in Coos County, Oregon, United States, located between Coquille and Myrtle Point on Oregon Route 42, near the Coquille River.

The locale got its name from Olaf Reed (1827-1906), who settled there in the 1870s. Olaf Reed was a Norwegian immigrant who started a partnership with Oden Nelson. They operated vessels on the Coquille River between Myrtle Point and Bandon, Oregon. Reed was a former sea captain and like his brothers Edward and Hans, he also worked as a shipbuilder.

Reed and Nelson started a general store in 1873. Norway's post office was established in 1876 and as of 2003, it had been moved a few miles from its first location. Norway post office closed in 2002; the community's mail is addressed to Myrtle Point. There was also a Norway station on the Southern Pacific Coos Bay Line.

In 1977, the whole community was put up for sale. At the time the two-acre townsite consisted of a store with living quarters upstairs, a café, a post office, a home, several old motel cabins and a defunct gas station.

In the early 1990s the population was single digits, under 10.

== See also ==
- Steamboats of the Coquille River
