= F. Leo Smith =

American politician (1903–1999)

F. Leo Smith (June 3, 1903-October 7, 1999) was a Democratic state legislator and Multnomah County district attorney in the U.S. state of Oregon.

He served in the state legislature from 1939 to 1945, and was appointed to succeed Multnomah County district attorney William Langley upon his removal from office in 1957. He did not seek reelection to that position.
