= William H. Steiwer =

American rancher and banker (1896–1972)

- State Senate President W. H. Steiwer

34th President of the Oregon State Senate
- In office 1943–1944
- Preceded by: Dean H. Walker
- Succeeded by: Howard C. Belton

Member of the Oregon Senate from the 18th district
- In office 1935–1944
- Preceded by: James P. Yates
- Succeeded by: Ernest R. Fatland
- Constituency: Gilliam, Sherman, and Wheeler counties

Personal details
- Born: September 18, 1896 Fossil, Oregon, U.S.
- Died: January 18, 1972 (aged 75) Portland, Oregon, U.S.
- Party: Republican
- Spouse: Dorothy A. Kerns (m. 1921)
- Profession: Rancher and banker

William Hoover Steiwer (September 18, 1896 – January 18, 1972) was an American rancher, banker, and legislator. He served ten years in the Oregon State Senate from 1935 through 1944. Steiwer was a conservative Republican who represented three rural Eastern Oregon counties in the state senate. He was President of the Oregon State Senate during the 1943 legislative session. His election to that post took 45 ballots. Throughout his adult life, Steiwer operated a 35,000-acre (14,000 ha) sheep and cattle ranch in Wheeler County, Oregon. He also served as a director of the Steiwer and Carpenter Bank for many years. Later, he was appointed a director of the Portland Branch of the Federal Reserve Bank of San Francisco. In addition, he served as president of both the Oregon Wool Growers Association and the National Wool Growers Associations.

== Early life ==
Steiwer was born on September 18, 1896, in Fossil, Oregon. He was the son of Winlock W. Steiwer and Anne Jeriah (Hoover) Steiwer. He grew up on a large ranch in Wheeler County, near the town of Fossil. His father was a successful cattle and sheep rancher and founder of the Steiwer and Carpenter Bank in Fossil, the first bank in Wheeler County. His father also served one four-year term in the Oregon State Senate from 1892 through 1895.

Steiwer attended high school at Portland Academy in Portland, Oregon. His education was based on a classical curriculum. He was also captain of the school's baseball team while at the academy. He graduated in 1915 with a Latin classical degree. After graduating from Portland Academy, Steiwer went on to Stanford University, where in addition to his academic work, he planned to try out for Stanford's baseball team. However, when the United States entered World War I in 1917, Steiwer joined the United States Army. During his military service, he was promoted several times, leaving the Army as a sergeant. In 1917, while still serving in the Army, Steiwer was elected to the board of directors of the Steiwer and Carpenter Bank.

By 1920, he had left the Army and returned to Eastern Oregon. He continued to work at the Steiwer and Carpenter Bank and became involved with community organizations, joining the American Legion and the local Elks lodge. During the early 1920s Steiwer also experienced both good and bad events in his personal life. His father died in 1920, so he took charge of his family's 35,000-acre (14,000 ha) sheep and cattle ranch. A year later, on October 15, 1921, Steiwer married Dorothy A. Kerns at the Kerns family home in Portland.

In 1927, Steiwer became vice president of the Steiwer and Carpenter Bank. Three years later, he was named Wheeler County committeeman on the state Republican central committee. During the Great Depression, he began helping farmers and ranchers secure the loans they needed to stay in business. In 1931, United States Secretary of Agriculture, Arthur M. Hyde, appointed Steiwer to the Oregon Drought Relief Committee. The committee was responsible for organizing an agricultural credit corporation in Oregon to facilitate the farm loan process.

== State senator ==
In late 1934, James P. Yates, the District 18 state senator who represented Gilliam, Sherman, and Wheeler counties resigned halfway through his four-year term. The state's Republican and Democratic parties were allowed to nominate a replacement candidate to run in the out-of-cycle 1934 general election to replace Yates. Oregon's Republican central committee nominated Steiwer. The state Democratic central committee nominated George H. Wilcox of Grass Valley. In the general election, held two weeks after the nominations were filed, Steiwer won the District 18 seat, allowing him to finish the final two years of Yates' four-year term.

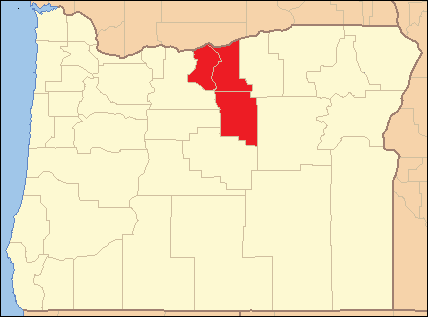
Oregon State Senate District 18, 1935–1944

Steiwer took his seat in the Oregon State Senate on January 14, 1935, representing District 18. He served through the 1935 regular legislative session which ended on March 13. During the session, Steiwer served as chairman of the livestock committee. He was also a member of the assessment and taxation, fishing industries, Insurance, and irrigation and drainage committees. He was a leading advocate for a state highway bill that directed the state highway commission to finish the existing highway system before initiating any new highway construction projects. Later that year, the legislature convened for a special session. Steiwer represented District 18 at the special session which began on October 21 and finished its business and adjourned on November 9.

In 1936, Steiwer decided to run for re-election. This time, he was seeking a full four-year term in the Oregon State Senate. He was the only Republican to file for the District 18 senate seat. On the Democratic side, George H. Wilcox filed for the District 18 position. However, before the general election was held, Wilcox was forced to withdraw from the race after he moved out of the district. As a result, Steiwer was unopposed in the general election and retained his senate seat representing Gilliam, Sherman, and Wheeler counties.

The 1937 legislative session began on January 11 and lasted through March 8. During the session, Steiwer was appointed chairman of livestock committee. He also served on assessment and taxation, banking, insurance, military affairs, public lands, resolutions, and roads and highways committees.

Since state senators served four-year terms, Steiwer did not have to run for re-election prior to the 1939 legislative session. He took his District 18 senate seat when the session opened on January 9. During the session, he served as chairman of assessment and taxation committee. He was also a member of the livestock, forestry and forest products, irrigation and drainage, resolutions, and revision of law committees. The session finished its business and adjourned on March 15.

In 1940, Steiwer once again ran for the senate seat in District 18. He was the only Republican to file for the position. In addition, no Democrats filed in District 18 so he was unopposed in both the Republican primary and the general elections.

The 1941 regular session of the Oregon legislature opened on January 13. Steiwer was appointed chairman of the assessment and taxation committee. During the session, he also served as a member of the livestock, elections and privileges, industries, and resolutions committees. The session closed on March 15. After the session was adjourned, the senate president appointed Steiwer to an interim study committee on industrial development. The committee was directed to review tax laws and other incentive that might help encourage new businesses to locate in Oregon. The results of the study were used by the next legislature to craft laws that helped the state's economy grow.

== President of the Senate ==
In 1942, Steiwer did not have to run for re-election because he was in the middle of his four-year term. After the 1942 election, the Oregon senate was made up of 27 Republicans and 3 Democrats. As a result, competition for senate president was a contest between Republican factions with the three Democrats siding with one Republican group or the other. The 1943 session opened on January 11. When the chamber began to organize itself, Steiwer was nominated for President of the Senate. He was opposed by Dorothy McCullough Lee, a Republican from Portland. Steiwer and Lee both had significant support from senate peers, leading to a 15 to 15 tie vote for senate president. This vote was repeated 44 times over the next two days. Finally, a compromise was reached, that allowed Steiwer to be elected as president of the senate on the 45th ballot. In return, Steiwer agreed to consult with Lee on all the senate committee appointments. They also agreed, if they could not jointly settle on an appointment, William H. Strayer, the senate's senior member and one of the chamber's three Democrats, would decide the appointment. The next day, Steiwer and Lee made the senate committee assignments without needing any help from Senator Strayer.

As the session got underway, Steiwer highlighted several challenges the legislature faced including allocating the state's income tax surplus between property tax relief and a future income tax reduction. He also highlighted unemployment benefits and workman compensation as high priorities for the session. At the close of the session, Steiwer made appointments to a number of interim committees that were tasked to study specific topic and present their finding to the next legislature. The 1943 legislative session was adjourned on March 10. There were no special sessions prior to the end of his term.

Steiwer continued representing senate District 18 and served as President of the Senate until his four-year term was completed at the end of 1944. However, he was called upon three times to serve as acting governor while Oregon's elected governor, Earl Snell, was out of the state, twice in 1943 and once in 1944. His first time as acting governor was in September 1943. While serving as acting governor, he appointed a new district attorney for Wheeler County as well as performing other state duties. The second time he was acting governor was an eight-day period in November 1943 when Governor Snell was presiding at a forestry conference in Chicago. His final tour as acting governor was in May 1944. It was a week-long stint while the governor was attending the national governors' conference in Pennsylvania.

== Later life ==
Steiwer did not run for re-election in 1944. Instead, he decided to focus attention on his ranching operation and other business interests in Wheeler County. Nevertheless, he continued his involvement in Republican politics. For example, he was elected as a delegate to national Republican convention in 1948.

A long-time member of the Oregon Wool Growers Association, Steiwer was elected president of that organization in 1949. Two year later, he was elected president of the National Wool Growers Association. That organization represented all the sheep ranchers in 12 western states plus some individual sheep breeders in midwestern and eastern states. In 1951, he traveled to Washington, D.C. to testify before the United States Congress on behalf of the wool grower association. In his testimony, Steiwer voiced the association's opposition to wool and lamb price controls and related subsidies. In 1951, he was re-elected as the association's national president. This allowed him to continue to advocate on behalf of the nation's wool industry.

Steiwer remained active in politics, business, and farming throughout the 1950s. In 1954, he served as state chairman for the re-election campaign of incumbent United States Senator Guy Cordon in his race against challenger Richard L. Neuberger. In 1955, he was appointed to a two-year term on the board of directors of the Portland Branch of Federal Reserve Bank of San Francisco. Also, Steiwer had planted a large tree farm on his Wheeler County ranch property in the early 1950s. He quickly became a major advocate for the development of tree farms in Oregon. His success as a tree farmer was recognized in 1966, when a major forest products company honored him with the Tree of the Future award.

Over the years, Steiwer was a member of the local Elks lodge, the American Legion, and Portland's University Club, a private social club. He was also a director of the American Sheep Producers Council. president of the Northwest Livestock Production Credit Association, a director of the Keep Oregon Green Association, and a director of the Columbia Basin Electric Cooperative, which provides electric power to users in Gilliam, Morrow, Sherman, Umatilla, and Wheeler counties.

Steiwer died on January 18, 1972, in Portland, Oregon. He was 76 years old at the time of his death. His funeral service was held on January 21, 1972. He was then interred in the mausoleum vault at Wilhelm's Portland Memorial Funeral Home.
