= Ernest R. Fatland =

Oregon businessman and state legislator

- Oregon state legislator Ernest Fatland, 1938

Member of the Oregon Senate from the 18th district
- In office 1945–1948
- Preceded by: William H. Stelwer
- Succeeded by: Stewart Hardie
- Constituency: Gilliam, Morrow, Sherman, and Wheeler counties

39th Speaker of the Oregon House of Representatives
- In office 1939–1940
- Preceded by: Harry D. Boivin
- Succeeded by: Robert S. Farrell Jr.

Member of the Oregon House of Representatives from the 22nd district
- In office 1935–1940
- Preceded by: Earl W. Snell
- Succeeded by: Harvey E. Miller

Personal details
- Born: August 20, 1896 Cambridge, Iowa, US
- Died: January 22, 1980 (aged 83) Condon, Oregon, US
- Party: Republican
- Profession: Businessman

Ernest Rudolph Fatland (August 20, 1896 – January 22, 1980) was an American businessman and politician who served as a state legislator for Oregon. He was a Republican who served six years in the Oregon House of Representatives, where he represented a district in rural north central Oregon. He served as Speaker of the Oregon House of Representatives during the 1939 legislative session. During his time as speaker, Fatland also served as acting governor on several occasions when the elected governor was traveling outside the state. After leaving the state House of Representatives, Fatland was appointed to the Oregon Liquor Control Commission. Later, he served one four-year term in the Oregon State Senate.

== Early life ==
Fatland was born in Cambridge, Iowa, on August 20, 1896. He was the son of Brit O. Fatland and Elsie Sarah (Berhow) Fatland. In 1904, he moved with his family from Iowa to Oregon, settling in Portland. Fatland attended Washington High School in Portland, where he was captain of the debate team and an active thespian. He was also editor of the high school newspaper.

After finishing high school, Fatland worked as a salesman for a Portland-based wholesale paper company. He also worked at a photo engraving shop before joining the United States Army in 1917. Fatland served as a military chauffeur/staff car driver in the Army Air Corps during World War I.

== Businessman and civic leader ==
After leaving the Army, Fatland operated a dairy farm in Arlington, Oregon, for a short time. In 1919, Fatland moved to Condon, Oregon, where he purchased a tire repair business in partnership with Clair Hopper. The business was originally housed in a 16-foot by 20-foot shop building in downtown Condon. In 1920, Fatland bought out Hopper's share of the business. A year later, he began doing automobile lubrication jobs and selling gasoline, oil, batteries, and automobile accessories. Over the years, Fatland grew the company into a successful regional automobile supply firm. In 1928, he built a large new store in downtown Condon to accommodate his expanding business.

After settling in Condon and establishing his business, Fatland married Velma Marie Couture on May 28, 1922. Together, they had two sons.

While Fatland was a successful businessman, he was also active in politics and served in a number of local government positions. He was a member of the Condon City Council for six years. He was also a member of the local school board for three years. As a dedicated Republican, he served on the Gilliam County Republican Central Committee. He was president of the John Day Highway Improvement Association and was an active member of the Gilliam County Tax Reduction League. During the early years of the Great Depression, Fatland was chairman of the Gilliam County Debt Adjustment Committee, an organization that helped farmers reduce their mortgage payments and other debts to save their farms from foreclosure.

In addition, Fatland was active in a number of civic and fraternal organizations. He was a member of the local Masonic lodge, American Legion, and the local grange.

== State representative ==
In 1934, Fatland decided to run for a District 22 seat the Oregon House of Representatives, representing Gilliam, Morrow, Sherman, and Wheeler counties. While incumbent Jesse O. Turner of Heppner also filed as a Republican, no Democrats joined the race. Because there were two seats in House District 22, political parties were able to nominate two candidates in the primary election so both Fatland and Turner were advanced to the general election. While there were no Democrats on the primary ballot, Hanson Hughes won the Democratic nomination with 49 write-in votes.

After winning the Democratic primary with write-in votes, Hughes dropped out of race before the general election, leaving only the two Republicans. However, because there had been a Democratic nominee, county commissioners from the four counties represented by District 22 were charged with selecting a replacement candidate for the Democratic ticket. They chose Paul Lynch. In the general election, Fatland and Lynch won the two District 22 seats.

Fatland took his seat in the Oregon House on January 14, 1935, representing District 22. He served through the 1955 regular legislative session which ended on March 13. During the session, Fatland was appointed to the agriculture, highways and highway revenues, alcoholic control, education, and game committees. As a member of the legislature, Fatland became a strong advocate for increased highway construction in eastern Oregon.

After the close of the 1935 regular session, Representative Lynch resigned from the legislature. County commissioners from the four District 22 counties selected Giles L. French, a Republican, to replace Lynch. Later that year, Fatland and French participated in a special legislative session. The special session began on October 21 and lasted through November 9.

In 1936, Fatland announced his decision to run for re-election in House District 22. He was joined by fellow incumbent Republican Giles French. Two Democrats, Hanson Hughes and I. D. Gray also filed in District 22. Because there were two seats in District 22, the two Republicans and both Democrats were advanced to the general election. In the general election, Fatland and French won the two District 22 seats. Fatland received 2,344 votes while French got 1,946; Hughes was third with 1,725 and Gray trailed behind with 1,573 votes.

Oregon's 1937 regular legislative session opened on January 11, 1937. Fatland served through the legislative assembly which ended on March 8. During the session, he was appointed vice chairman of alcoholic control committee. He was also a member of the agriculture, highways and highway revenues, education, labor and industry, and game committees.

In early 1938, Fatland announced his re-election bid. Fellow incumbent Giles French also filed as a Republican in District 22. No Democrats filed in the District, so Fatland and French were unopposed in both the Republican primary and the general election.

After the general election in November, Fatland began consolidating his support for the House speaker position. The Oregon House had a 48 to 12 Republican majority heading into the 1939 session. As a result, it was clear that a Republican would be speaker. There were three other Republicans seeking the position, Walter Fuhrer of Salem, Earl Hill of Lane County, and Frank Lonergan of Portland. By early December, Fatland had locked up enough votes from his colleagues to ensure his election as speaker.

The 1939 legislative session opened on January 9. When the House was organized, Fatland was elected speaker. The same day, he made the House committee appointments. It proved to be a routine session until the final week when there was a push by several legislators to pass a bill that would have placed a sales tax referendum before voters. Fatland killed the bill by preventing it from reaching the House floor. The session finally closed on March 15.

After the 1939 legislative session ended, Fatland and Senate President Robert M. Duncan automatically became co-chairmen of the Legislative Emergency Board. The emergency board is a powerful legislative committee that acts on behalf of the entire legislature when that body is out of session. Fatland and Duncan appointed selected legislators to serve on the board for the remainder of the biennium.

In December 1939, Duncan resigned from the state senate to become an Oregon state judge. As Speaker of the House, Fatland was next in line to step in as acting governor whenever Governor Charles A. Sprague left the state. This occurred at least four time in 1940. The first occasion he served as acting governor was a brief period in February. Fatland's second period as acting governor was in May, when he was chief executive for two weeks. He took on the role again in June for a brief time and again in October.

Fatland decide not to run for re-election in 1940. He did not publicly disclose his rationale for the decision.

== World War II period ==
When his House term expired at the end of 1940, Fatland returned to his home and business in Condon. However, he remained active in state government and organizations that supported America's war effort during World War II. In 1941, Governor Sprague appointed Fatland to Oregon's new State Defense Council, an organization charged with preparing the state for mobilization in case the United States was drawn into war. Later that year, he was appointed to a vacant position on the Oregon Liquor Control Commission. He remained on the commission until 1943, when he resigned to devote more time to his automobile service and supply business in Condon.

After the United States entered World War II, Fatland actively supported the Oregon War Chest organization and was elected to that group's board of directors in 1944. After the war, Fatland headed the internal committee that studied what to do with residual funds held by that organization. His committee recommended that the word "war" be dropped from the name, so the non-profit group became the Oregon Chest. It was also decided that the organization would continue to use its resources to support child-care agencies throughout the state. At the same time, Fatland was elected vice president of the new Oregon Chest organization.

== State senator ==
In 1944, Fatland decided to run for the state senate seat in District 18, representing Gilliam, Morrow, Sherman, and Wheeler counties. The seat was being vacated by William H. Steiwer, who was finishing his term as state Senate President. No other Republicans filed for the District 18 senate seat; nor did any Democrats, so Fatland was unopposed in both the Republican primary and the general election.

Fatland took his seat in the Oregon State Senate on January 8, 1945, representing District 18. He served through the 1945 regular legislative session which ended on March 17. During the session, Fatland was appointed chairman of game committee and vice chairman of the roads and highways committee. He also served on the alcohol traffic, education, and judiciary committees.

Because state senators serve four-year terms, Fatland did not have to run for re-election in 1946. He took his District 18 seat representing Gilliam, Morrow, Sherman, and Wheeler counties when the 1947 legislative session began on January 13. When the senate was organized, Senate President Marshall Cornett appointed Fatland chairman of the assessment and taxation committee. He was also assigned membership on the banking, education, roads and highways, alcohol traffic, and rules committees. The 1947 legislative session ended on April 5.

After the 1947 legislative session ended, Fatland was appointed to the senate's iterum committee on highways and roads. The committee was charged with studying Oregon's highway system and making recommendations to improve the state's roads and highways. The committee held hearings throughout the state during the 18 months the legislature was out of session.

In the runup to the 1948 campaign season, the news media speculated that Fatland might be a good candidate to fill eastern Oregon's congressional seat if Lowell Stockman decided to retire. However, Fatland decided to run for re-election in senate District 18. Stewart Hardie of Condon also filed for the District 18 senate seat as a Republican. In May, Hardie defeated Fatland in the Republican primary.

== Post-legislative career ==
After losing his re-election bid, Fatland remained engaged in public affairs. Before finishing his four-year senate term at the end of 1948, Fatland completed his work on the interim legislative committee on highways and roads. In December 1948, he endorsed the committee's final report. The report recommended a 1 cent increase to the state gas tax, raising the tax to 6 cents per gallon. The report also recommended a $10 automobile registration fee. The increased revenue was to be used to finance a 15-year road construction program around to the state. While the report received praise from some newspapers, the proposed tax and fee increases were not popular with the general public. Nevertheless, Fatland remained a strong advocate for better roads in eastern Oregon throughout his life.

After leaving the state senate, Fatland was also able to spend more time overseeing his automobile supply business in Condon. He remained active in the business for the rest of his life. As of 1998, the business was still owned by the Fatland family. At that time, it was the oldest Goodyear tire dealership in Oregon.

In 1952, Governor Paul L. Patterson appointed Fatland to write the official non-partisan explanation of a state-wide ballot measure on a proposed constitutional amendment regarding legislative reapportionment for the 1952 Oregon voters pamphlet. Later that year, Fatland was the leading candidate for appointment as state tax commissioner until he announced he was not interested in the post.

Fatland was a member of the Oregon Business and Tax Research organization for 20 years, including two terms as president of that group from 1955 through 1958. In addition, he served eight years on the Oregon State Parks and Recreation Advisory Committee beginning in 1962.

Fatland died on January 19, 1980, at his home in Condon, Oregon. His funeral was held at the Condon United Church of Christ on January 22. He was buried in Condon’s Masonic cemetery.
