= Burt K. Snyder =

American politician

Burt Snyder
- State Representative Burt Snyder, 1938

Member of the Oregon House of Representatives from the 29th district
- In office 1937–1948
- Preceded by: C. W. E. Jennings
- Succeeded by: James F. Short

Personal details
- Born: December 27, 1890 Lakeview, Oregon, U.S.
- Died: March 10, 1964 (aged 73) Lakeview, Oregon, U.S.
- Party: Republican
- Spouse: Gwendolyn Snyder
- Occupation: Pharmacist, politician

Burt Kay Snyder (27 December 1890 – 10 March 1964) was a businessman and Oregon state legislator. He was a Republican member of the Oregon House of Representatives for five terms, from 1939 through 1948. His will established the Burt Snyder Educational Foundation for the benefit of students from Lake County, Oregon.

== Early life ==
Snyder was born in Lakeview, Oregon, on 27 December 1890. James Snyder owned a sawmill near Camp Creek at the north end of Goose Lake Valley. The mill was powered by a horse-driven generator. As a boy, Burt's first job was keeping the horse moving around the drive post so the mill would not lose its source of power. He attended grade school and high school in Lakeview. However, he did not attend college. Instead, Snyder learned pharmacy as an apprentice at Thornton's Drug Company in Lakeview. He received his pharmacy license from the state board of pharmacy in 1911.

In 1912, Snyder formed a partnership with Fred Reynolds, creating the Reynolds and Snyder Drug Company. They rented a store front on the east side of the new Heryford Brothers Building in downtown Lakeview and opened a pharmacy there. Once his drugstore business was established, Snyder became an active member of the Lake County Chamber of Commerce and was a founding member of the Rotary Club of Lakeview.

In 1914, Snyder married Gwendolyn Corbett, a Lakeview area teacher

== Political career ==
Snyder remained active in community affairs throughout the 1920s and 1930s, serving two terms on the Lakeview city council and one term as the city's mayor. He also continued his work with the local chamber of commerce. In 1938, he served as a member of the board of director for the Shasta-Cascade Wonderland Association which was responsible for building and maintaining the Shasta-Cascade pavilion at the Golden Gate International Exposition held in San Francisco that year.

Snyder, a Republican, ran for the Oregon House of Representatives in 1938. As a candidate, his interest included stimulating economic growth for job creation, curbing taxes, expanding highway construction, and comprehensive use of public water resources for power, irrigation and livestock. Here is what he told The Bend Bulletin during his 1938 campaign:

I believe that public affairs in Oregon should continue to be economically administered; but I believe that Oregon should be progressive enough to maintain a favorable balance of trade that would justify employment of every idle man. This balance of trade may be fostered in many ways—by promoting tourist travel, as is now being done by a state agency—by extensive advertising of Oregon farm products in outside markets—and by encouraging more manufacturing within the state. Our natural resources should be carefully considered and fairly administered.

Snyder defeated the incumbent Democrat, C. W. E. Jennings, in the 1938 general election. He took his seat as a state legislature in early 1939, representing Deschutes and Lake counties.

Snyder was extremely popular with his constituents. When he ran for re-election in 1940, he not only won the Republican nomination, but also received enough Democratic write-in votes to win the Democratic primary. During the 1941 legislative session, he was chairman of the highways and highway revenues committee. He also served as a member of the banking, medical and pharmacy, taxation and revenue, and corrections committees. Snyder was unopposed when he ran for re-election in 1942. Following his re-election, he served in the short 1943 legislative session, from January through March of that year.

During World War II, in addition to serving in the state legislature, Snyder headed a campaign to sell United States war bonds in Eastern Oregon communities. In this role, he met with civic leaders and businessmen in towns throughout Eastern Oregon.

Snyder went on to serve two more terms as a state representative, holding his seat through 1948. At the end of the 1947 legislative session, Snyder announced he would not seek a sixth term. In his announcement, Snyder said he was stepping aside "to make room for new blood."

== Later life ==
After leaving the state legislature, Snyder returned to his business in Lakeview and continued as a member of the Lake County Chamber of Commerce. He also served on the Bernard Daly Educational Fund board of trustees for many years.

Snyder died on 10 March 1964.

== Legacy ==
After his death, Snyder's will established the Burt Snyder Educational Foundation. The foundation funds post-graduate education for students from Lake County, Oregon. The first Snyder scholarships were awarded in 1966. Since then, an average of two scholarships per year have been awarded. As of 2013, recipients receive $8,400 per year for professional or graduate level studies. The Snyder foundation is administered by the Bernard Daly Educational Fund board of trustees.
