= H. T. Hesse =

American politician

Henry T. Hesse

Member of the Oregon House of Representatives from the 4th district
- In office 1939–1947
- Preceded by: Ray L. Antrim
- Succeeded by: Harry Schmeltzer

Personal details
- Born: 1879
- Died: July 17, 1947 (aged 67–68)
- Resting place: Lewis Pioneer Cemetery
- Party: Republican
- Occupation: Farmer

Henry T. Hesse (1879–1947) was a politician and farmer in the U.S. state of Oregon. A Republican, he served in the Oregon Legislative Assembly representing Hillsboro.

== Early life ==
Hesse was one of four children of Christopher Frederick Hesse (d. 1919). He was a farmer, raising a herd of Guernsey cattle on a dairy near Hillsboro.

== Political career ==
Hesse began his political career as a county commissioner for Washington County in the 1910s. He later served as school clerk in Hillsboro and on the board of the Washington County Fair. In 1938, he was elected as a Republican to District 4 of the Oregon House of Representatives, replacing Ray L. Antrim of Aloha. He served in the 1939, 1941, 1943, 1945 sessions before Harry Schmeltzer replaced him in District 4. Hesse won reelection in November 1946, but resigned due to poor health and died on July 17, 1947.
