= William E. Walsh (Oregon politician) =

American lawyer and politician

William E. Walsh (1903–1975) was an American lawyer and Republican politician from Coos County in the U.S. state of Oregon. Walsh served in the Oregon State Senate from 1941 to 1952 and was appointed President of the Oregon State Senate in 1949.

He was born in Oswego, New York and was educated at Willamette University. Walsh served as president of the State Board of Higher Education, as a member of board of trustees for Willamette University and as a member of the board of governors for the Oregon State Bar. In 1949, he founded the radio station KWRO in Coquille, Oregon.
