= William M. McAllister =

American judge

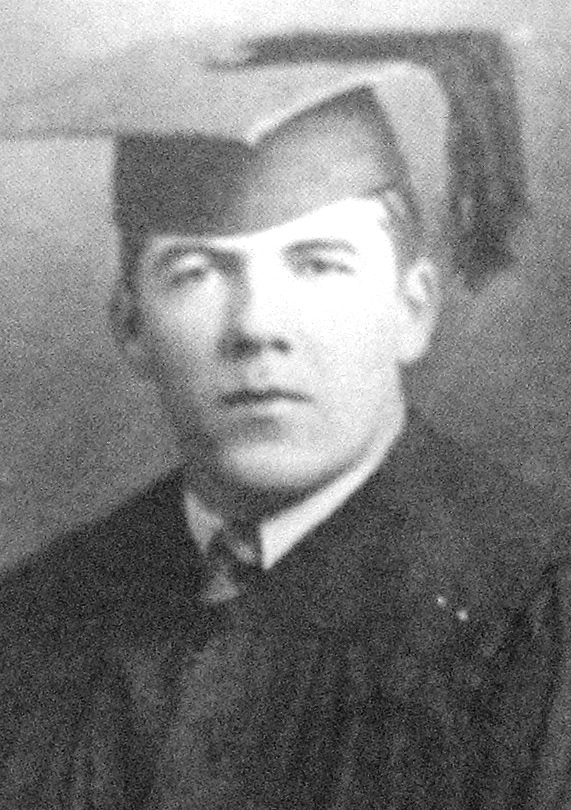
- McAllister in 1928

35th Chief Justice of the Oregon Supreme Court
- In office 1959–1967
- Preceded by: William C. Perry
- Succeeded by: William C. Perry

68th Justice of the Oregon Supreme Court
- In office 1956–1976
- Appointed by: Elmo Smith
- Preceded by: Earl C. Latourette
- Succeeded by: Hans A. Linde

41st Speaker of the Oregon House of Representatives
- In office 1943–1944
- Preceded by: Robert S. Farrell, Jr.
- Succeeded by: Eugene E. Marsh
- Constituency: Jackson County

Personal details
- Born: William Menzies McAllister; November 2, 1905 Portland, Oregon, U.S.
- Died: October 13, 1986 (aged 80) Salem, Oregon, U.S.
- Party: Republican
- Spouse: Jean Middleton McAllister

William Menzies McAllister (November 2, 1905 – October 13, 1986) was an American politician and jurist in the state of Oregon. He served as Speaker of the Oregon House of Representatives in the 1940s, served on the Oregon Supreme Court, and was chief justice of the court for eight years beginning in 1959.

== Early years ==
William McAllister was born in Portland on November 2, 1905. In 1928, he graduated from Willamette University College of Law with an LL.B. and was a member of the Delta Theta Phi legal fraternity. He would marry Jean Middleton McAllister, a 1931 graduate of Willamette University. After graduation, he worked in the state of Washington for three years. McAllister then started a law firm in Medford, in Jackson County, Oregon, where he remained for 25 years. The firm is now called Brophy, Mills, Schmor, Gerking, Brophy & Paradis, and was founded in 1942.

== Political career ==
In 1937, William M. McAllister represented Oregon house district 19. He was elected as a Republican from Medford, Oregon. He served in the House until 1948. McAllister was selected as Speaker of the Oregon House for the 1943 legislative session. During World War II he was a United States Army captain.

In 1948, he won election to the Oregon State Senate, and served in that chamber during the 1949 session. Also in 1948, and again in 1952, William M. McAllister was a delegate from Oregon to the Republican National Convention, with his wife serving as an alternate in 1948. From 1948 to 1951 he was on the Oregon State Bar's board of governors, followed by the state bar examiners board from 1954 to 1956.

On August 24, 1956, William M. McAllister was appointed to the Oregon Supreme Court as a justice. Oregon Governor Elmo Smith appointed him to replace Earl C. Latourette. Later that year McAllister won election to a full six-year term. In 1959, he was chosen by his fellow justices to serve as Chief Justice of the court. He served in this role until 1967, in which he both replaced and was replaced in that position by William C. Perry. In 1959, McAllister was a member of the Conference of State Chief Justices. He served as the chairman of that group in both 1964 and 1965. McAllister won re-election to the bench in both 1968 and 1974. In 1973, he was the first active judge to serve on the American Bar Association's board of governors. He then resigned from the court on December 31, 1976, and was replaced by Hans A. Linde.

== Later life and family ==
In 1976, McAllister was given the Distinguished Law Alumni Award from the Willamette University College of Law, the first recipient of that award. His had two children with his wife Jean, William and Kathryn. William McAllister died in Salem, Oregon, on October 13, 1986, at the age of 90 years.
