= John F. Steelhammer =

American politician

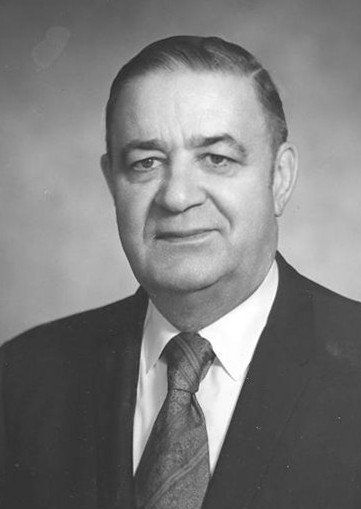

Member of the Oregon House of Representatives from the Salem district

Personal details
- Born: January 27, 1909 Woodburn, Oregon
- Died: May 3, 1974 (aged 65) Salem, Oregon
- Party: Republican

John F. Steelhammer (January 27, 1909 – May 3, 1974) was an American politician in the state of Oregon. Born in Woodburn, Oregon, the son of the community's longtime mayor. He attended Oregon Normal College (now Western Oregon University) in Monmouth, and was a teacher in Boardman, Oregon for two years. Receiving an LL.B from Willamette University in Salem, Oregon, Steelhammer began practicing law. Later he was a lobbyist for the banking industry. In 1938 Steelhammer ran successfully for Oregon House of Representatives as a Republican from Marion County. He was seriously injured in an accident during his first term, causing him to resign his seat. However, he was again elected to the House in 1940, 1942, 1944, 1948, and 1950. Steelhammer enlisted in the U.S. Army after the 1943 session and was discharged as a sergeant 16 months later. Although not present during the 1944 reelection campaign, he received the largest vote of Marion County's four representatives. Steelhammer was named to the Speakership in 1951 under the guidance of veteran kingmaker "Uncle" Earl Hill. Unlike many speakers who adopted the role of moderator, Steelhammer used the position to advocate policies. His bustling and enthusiasm won him much admiration amongst his colleagues. Steelhammer continued his law practice after retirement from politics, he married Dorothy Vandeneynde in 1946, and the couple had three children, Jann, Joan, and John III. Steelhammer died on May 3, 1974, at the age of 65.
