= Dean Walker =

American athlete, coach and politician

Dean H. Walker
- State Senator Dean Walker

33rd President of the Oregon State Senate
- In office 1941–1943
- Preceded by: Robert M. Duncan
- Succeeded by: William H. Steiwer

Personal details
- Born: September 9, 1889 Rickreall, Oregon, U.S.
- Died: December 24, 1953 (aged 64) Salem, Oregon, U.S.
- Party: Republican
- Education: University of Oregon; Columbia University
- Coaching career

Playing career

Football
- 1907–1908: Columbia (OR)
- 1909–1912: Oregon

Coaching career (HC unless noted)

Football
- 1916–1917: Oregon (Freshmen)

Basketball
- 1918–1919: Oregon

Baseball
- 1918: Oregon

Administrative career (AD unless noted)
- 1913–1914: Oregon (Grad. Man. of Ath.)
- 1918–1919: Oregon (Grad. Man. of Ath.)
- 1923–1925: Oregon (Student loan dir.)
- 1925–1927: Oregon (Dean of men)

Head coaching record
- Overall: 13–4 (men's basketball); 10–2 (baseball)

Accomplishments and honors

Championships
- Pacific Coast Conference basketball champion (1919)

Dean H. Walker (September 9, 1889 – December 24, 1953) was an American athlete, coach, politician who played running back for the University of Oregon football team from 1909 to 1912, was head coach of the University of Oregon men's basketball team from 1918 to 1919, and was president of the Oregon State Senate from 1941 to 1943.

== Early life ==
Walker was born in Rickreall, Oregon on September 9, 1889 to Sida and Georgia Walker. He played football at Independence High School in Independence, Oregon and was captain of the team his senior season. He then played two seasons for Columbia University (now the University of Portland) and was team captain during his second season.

== University of Oregon ==
Walker was a substitute fullback for the 1909 Oregon Webfoots football team, but received almost the same amount of playing time as a starter due to coach Robert Forbes' dual team system. He began the 1910 season as the team's starting halfback, but was forced to withdraw from the university before the season ended. He returned to the team in 1911 and was captain of the 1912 Oregon Webfoots football team. Walker was also a forward on the Oregon basketball team for two seasons.

In 1913, Walker was named Oregon's graduate manager of athletics. He gave the job up after one year to take over his father's ranch. He also sold hop insurance and spraying materials. He returned to the university in 1916 as freshman football coach. He returned for the 1917 season and the following spring was named head coach of the Oregon baseball team. In 1918, he was once again named graduate manager after A. R. Tiffany resigned to focus on his duties as registrar. In 1919, Walker led Oregon's basketball team to the Pacific Coast Conference title, defeating California Golden Bears two games to none in a best-of-three championship series. Later that year, he resigned as graduate manager and was replaced by Marion McClain.

After leaving the university, Walker was a junior partner in the Wetherbee-Walker furniture company. In 1923, he left the firm to return to Oregon as student loan director. In 1925, he became the university's dean of men. In 1927, he was granted a leave of absence to study at Columbia University.

== Politics ==
In 1920, the Eugene, Oregon city council unanimously voted to appoint Walker to fill the unexpired term of Ward 1 councilor William Polders.

From 1933 to 1935, Walker, who was now residing in Independence, represented the 10th House district in the Oregon House of Representatives. In 1934, he was elected to the 9th district seat in the Oregon State Senate by a 63-vote margin. He was appointed chairman of the ways and means committee as a freshman and was reappointed for the 1937–38 and 1939–40 legislative sessions.

In 1941, he was unanimously voted president of the Oregon State Senate. He did not run for the presidency in 1943, but remained in the legislature and was appointed chairman of the senate tax committee. In 1945, he was once again named head of the ways and means committee. He was reappointed in 1947. In 1949, Walker, now Dean of the Senate, was once again chairman of the tax committee.

In 1949, Walker was the primary sponsor of a bill which would make it unlawful to operate a theater without prohibiting the eating of popcorn and peanuts. Any theater owner found in violation would be subject to a $100 fine or 30 days in jail. Any patron annoyed by someone eating popcorn or peanuts could get thrice the cost of their ticket back and sue for damages if they did not receive the money. The bill did not get far, but attracted nationwide attention.

For the 1953–54 legislative session, Walker was named chairman of the ways and means committee and vice chairman of the tax committee. On December 24, 1953, Walker died in Salem, Oregon following a heart attack.
