= Henry Semon =

American politician (1884–1958)

- State Representative Henry Semon

Member of the Oregon House of Representatives from the 32nd and 30th district
- In office 1933–1956
- Preceded by: Perry O. DeLap
- Succeeded by: Carl Yancey

Personal details
- Born: November 3, 1884 Port Clinton, Ohio
- Died: October 9, 1958 (aged 73) Klamath Falls, Oregon
- Party: Independent; then Democrat
- Spouse: Hazel Burnett Semon
- Profession: Farmer

Henry Semon (November 3, 1884 – October 9, 1958), also known as Hank Semon, (Note: Semon did not have a middle name or initial.) was a potato farmer and politician from Oregon. He served twelve terms in the Oregon House of Representatives, making him one of the longest serving members of that body. A conservative Democrat from a rural district, Semon was known for his ability to work with Republicans in the state legislature. As a result, he served as chairman of the powerful ways and means committee for nine terms, serving in that position under both Democratic and Republican majorities. He was also an innovative farmer, who brought a new potato variety into common use in south central Oregon.

== Early life ==
Semon was born on November 3, 1884, in Port Clinton, Ohio. He was the son of Thomas and Louise (Nieman) Semon. His parents were born in (Germany) and immigrated to the United States when they were young. Semon grew up on his parents' Ohio farm, near Lake Erie. He attended public school in Port Clinton and then took work as a carpenter. He pursued that trade in Ohio until 1906 when he left for the west coast.

After arriving in California, Semon worked for a short time in Los Angeles. He then moved to Bisbee, Arizona where he worked as a carpenter. While there, Semon became interested in modern farming practices and related technologies. After two years in Arizona, he moved to California's Imperial Valley to pursue those interests. He leased land there and planted a cantaloupe crop, but it was not a profitable venture so he returned to Los Angeles where he took up his carpentry trade once again.

Despite failing at his initial farming attempt, Semon continued to look for a location to establish a farming operation. In 1910, Semon purchased a 155 acres (63 ha) farm in southern Klamath County, Oregon. He initially planted apple trees and berries, but soon began growing potatoes. Semon was widely known for his innovative farmer practices. He introduced the Netted Gem variety of potato to the county. This new variety quickly became an important crop in the Klamath Basin. He was also the first farmer in the Klamath Basin to harvest alsike clover.

Semon married Hazel Burnett on April 16, 1916. Together, they had two children, Gretchen born in 1917 and Charles born in 1920. During this period, Semon also became active in a number of Klamath County civic and commercial organizations. He was a member of Klamath Elks Lodge, the local Rotary club, the Henley area Grange, and the Klamath County chamber of commerce. He was a founding member and first president of the Klamath County Potato Growers Association. Semon was also a member of Klamath County School Board for 7 years. In addition, he was a founding director of the First Federal Saving and Loan Association of Klamath Falls and served on the association's board of directors the twenty-five years.

== State Representative, 1930s ==
In 1932, Semon decided to run for a seat in the Oregon House of Representatives as an independent candidate. To qualify for the general election ballot as an independent, Semon had to gather the signatures of 250 Klamath County voters on a nominating petition, which he did. In the general election, Semon got the most votes in a field of four candidates, winning one of the two District 32 seats that represented Klamath County in the state House of Representatives. Semon was the only Independent in the Oregon legislature that session. He served in the regular session that began on January 1, 1933, and lasted through March 9. During the session, Semon served as chairman of the agriculture committee. He was also a member of horticulture, irrigation and drainage, and livestock committees. During this term, Semon also served in two special sessions, one in early January 1933 and one in November and December of that year.

In 1934, Semon filed for re-election to House of Representatives as Democrat. Semon and Harry D. Boivin are unopposed in the Democratic primary for the two District 32 House seat nominations while Walter C. Von Enon and C. R. William won the two Republican nominations. In the general election, Semon and Boivin easily won the two District 32 seats. During the regular legislative session that began on January 14, 1935, Semon was appointed chairman of the powerful ways and means committee. He also served on the administration and reorganization, irrigation and drainage, education, and assessment and taxation committees.

After the legislative session ended, Governor Charles Martin appointed Semon to state agriculture board. Because the position was an unpaid advisory position, Semon was advised that it did not conflict with his legislative responsibilities. However, Oregon Attorney General Isaac H. Van Winkle ruled that state legislators automatically forfeited their legislative seats when they accepted any state or federal position. Because of the ruling, Semons and five other legislators (all Democrats) lost their seats including the serving Speaker of the House of Representatives, John E. Cooter. After the ruling was announced, the Klamath County commissioners court was responsible for appointing a successor to fill Semon's vacant House seat. After Semon resigned from the state agriculture board, Klamath County commissioners unanimously reappointed him to the District 32 representative position he lost due to the Attorney General's ruling. A subsequent attorney general opinion ruled that Semon's reappointment to the legislature did not automatically restore him as chairman of way and mean committee. The same opinion also disqualified him from continuing to serve on the powerful State Emergency Board, which acts on behalf of the legislature when that body is out of session.

In October 1935, the governor called a special session of the legislature. Because the elected speaker had accepting a federal appointment, he lost his position in the legislature, leaving the speakers position vacant when the special session began. As the special session got underway, Semon was a serious contender for speaker. However, he lost the speaker position to Howard Latourette by one vote.

Semon filed for re-election to the House in 1936. Semon and Boivin were assured of re-election because no other Democrats or any Republicans filed for the two District 32 seats. The two incumbents won the Democratic primary unopposed and the republican primary with write-in votes. Semon won the Republican primary 179 write-in votes. During the 1937 regular session, Boivin was elected Speaker of the House. He appointed Semon as chairman of the ways and means committee. Semon was also appointed to the agriculture, irrigation and drainage, and engrossed and enrolled bills committees. After the session ended, Boivin appointed Semon to chair an interim committee charged with rewriting the state's agriculture laws. Semon also served on State Emergency Board for the remainder of the biennium.

In 1938, Semon ran for a fourth term. Semon and Boivin were the Democratic nominees for the two District 32 seats in the House while Frank I. White was the only Republican nominee. Semon and Boivin were easily re-elected, Semon received 5,217 votes with Boivin running second with 5,131 followed by White with 3,196. During the 1938 election, Republicans took control of the House. Although he was a Democrat, Semon was appointed chairman of the Agriculture Committee. He also remained on the Ways and Means Committee as a regular member. In addition, he served on the Administration & Reorganization and Assessment & Taxation committees. The 1939 regular session began on January 9 and lasted four months, ending on 15 May.

== State Representative, 1940s ==
Once again in 1940, Semon and Boivin were unopposed in Democratic primary while Paula O. Landry and Walter Webster won Republican nominations. Semon and Boivin won the two District 32 seats in the general election with Semon receiving 7,243 votes and Boivin with 6,892; Landry got 6,383 while Webster trailed the field with 4,019 votes. The 1941 legislative session began on January 13 and lasted through March 15. During the session, Semon served on the ways and means, administration and re-organization, irrigation and drainage, and labor and industries committees.

In 1942, Semon ran for another term in the House. Semon and Boivin won the Democratic nominations over Lee Jacobs and Wilber Yeoman. No Republicans filed for the two District 32 seats so Semon and Boivin were unopposed in the general election. As a result, they both retained their seats. The 1943 legislative session began on January 11 and lasted through March 10. During the session, Semon served on the ways and means, institutions, higher education, and claims committees.

Semon ran for re-election again in 1944. There were only two Democrats, Semon and Thomas E. Bustin, and two republicans, Rose M. Poole and Dale West, running in the primary election so all four were nominated and advance to the general election. Shortly after the primary election, Semon received word that his son Charles, a United States Army second lieutenant serving as a paratrooper, was killed in France on D-Day (June 6, 1944). In the November general election, Semon and Poole won the two District 32 seats. Semon received 6,942 votes while Poole got 4,891; West finished third with 4,709 votes while Bustin got 3,682. The 1945 regular legislative session began on January 8 with the Republicans holding a majority of the House seats. Nevertheless, the Republican speaker appointed Semon chairman of the ways and means committee. During the session, he also served on the agriculture, health and public morals, and irrigation committees. The session ended on March 17.

In 1946, Semon was the only Democrat who ran for a District 32 seat. The Republican nominated two candidates, the incumbent Rose Poole and Troy Cook. Semon and Poole were both re-elected in the general election. During the 1947 legislative session, Semon was one of only two Democrats with a seat in Oregon's House of Representatives. He was appointed vice chairman of ways and means committee and also served on the agriculture and state and federal affairs committees. The session began on January 13 and ended on April 5.

Semon ran for re-election again in 1948. Semon and Thomas Bustin were nominated in the Democratic primary while Edward A. Geary and Carl Steinseifer were nominated on the Republican side. Semon and Geary won the two District 32 seats with Semon receiving 6,914 votes and Geary getting 5,689; Bustin was third with 4,091 followed by Steinseifer who got only 3,757 votes. The 1949 legislative session began on January 10 and last through 3 May. Once again, the Republicans had a big majority. Nevertheless, Semon was appointed chairman of the ways and means committee, the only Democrat given a committee chairmanship. He was also appointed to the elections and rules and resolutions committees. After the session ended, Semon was appointed to the State Emergency Board where he serve for the rest of the biennium.

== State Representative, 1950s ==
Semon ran for his tenth term in 1950. While Semon and Jesse Z. Smith were nominated in the Democratic primary, it was a very close race for Semon who ran second, only 25 votes ahead of the third-place finisher. The other District 32 incumbent, Edward Geary, was nominated in the Republican primary along with Fred Peterson. Semon and Geary were both re-elected in the November general election. The 1951 regular session began on January 8 and finished on 3 May. During the session, Semon served once again as chairman of the ways and means committee. He was also appointed to the rules and resolutions committee. After the session ended, Semon was reappointed to the State Emergency Board.

Semon was unopposed in the Democratic primary in 1952 while Edward Geary was unopposed in the Republican primary. As a result, Semon and Geary were unopposed for the two District 32 seats in the general election so both incumbent retained their seats. The 1953 legislative session ran from January 12 through April 21. During the session, Semon once again served as chairman of the ways and means committee. After the session, Semon continued his service on the State Emergency Board.

In 1954, Semon run for a twelfth term. However, redistricting had changed the Klamath County seats from District 32 to District 30. Semon was nominated in the Democratic primary along with Dorthy Lowell while his fellow incumbent Edward Geary was nominated on the Republican side. In the general election Semon and Geary easily retained their seats. The 1955 legislative session ran from January 10 through May 4. During the session, Geary was elected speaker of the House. While Geary led a Republican majority, he selected his Democratic colleague from Klamath County to serve as chairman the ways and means committee. After the session ended he was once again appointed to the State Emergency Board, representing the legislature when it is out of session.

In 1956, Semon was finishing his twelve terms in the Oregon House and was tired with Representative Herman H. Chindgren for the longest tenure in the body. However, his conservative voting record had led to conflicts with Democratic Party leaders. As a result, he decided to run for re-election in 1956 as an independent candidate instead of a Democrat. Since he filed as an independent, Semon did not run in the primary election. In the November general election, Semon ran third in a field of five candidates, behind Democrats John L. Kerbow and Carl Yancey. Since District 30 had only two seats, Semon lost his bid for another term. However, he remained on the State Emergency Board serving out his previous term which ended in early January 1957 when the new legislature was sworn into office.

A factor in Semon's defeat may have been a lawsuit filed against him just prior to the election. In the lawsuit, Mildred Hoffman alleged that Semon had been responsible for a 1954 automobile accident that caused her serious injuries.

== Later life and legacy ==
Two weeks after the 1956 general election, the trial to resolve Hoffman's lawsuit against Semon began in Klamath Falls. Hoffman was seeking $101,000 in damages for injuries resulting from an automobile accident which she claimed Semon had caused. Shortly after the proceeding got underway, Hoffman's lawyer asked that the proceeding be delayed while the plaintiff documented additional injuries. The judge granted a continuance which put the trial on temporary hold. Eventually, the trial went forward. The final outcome was a judgement against Semon which required him to pay Hoffman $15,000 for her injuries.

After leaving the legislature, Semon continued to farm and remained active in a wide range of state and local organizations. These included the local Elks lodge, the Klamath Falls Rotary club, and the Henley grange as well as the Klamath County chamber of commerce and the Klamath County Potato Growers Association. He also continued serving on the board of directors for the First Federal Saving and Loan Association of Klamath Falls until his death.

Semon died on October 9, 1958, after suffering a stroke at his home south of Klamath Falls. His funeral was held at Mount Laki Church on October 11, 1958. He was buried at the Mount Laki Cemetery south of Klamath Falls.

Shortly after his death, the Oregon Board of Higher Education voted to name the student union at Oregon Institute of Technology after Semon. The board wanted to recognize Semon for his long-time support and advocacy for the school. When the next legislative session began in January 1959, one of the first bills passed was a resolution honoring Semon for his long service to the State of Oregon. The resolution passed both the state House and Senate unanimously.

Today, Semon's legislative correspondence and other papers are part of the University of Oregon library's special archives collection. There are over 3,000 of letters and other documents in the Semon collection.
