= 49th Oregon Legislative Assembly =

| ← | 48th Legislative Assembly | 50th Legislative Assembly | → |
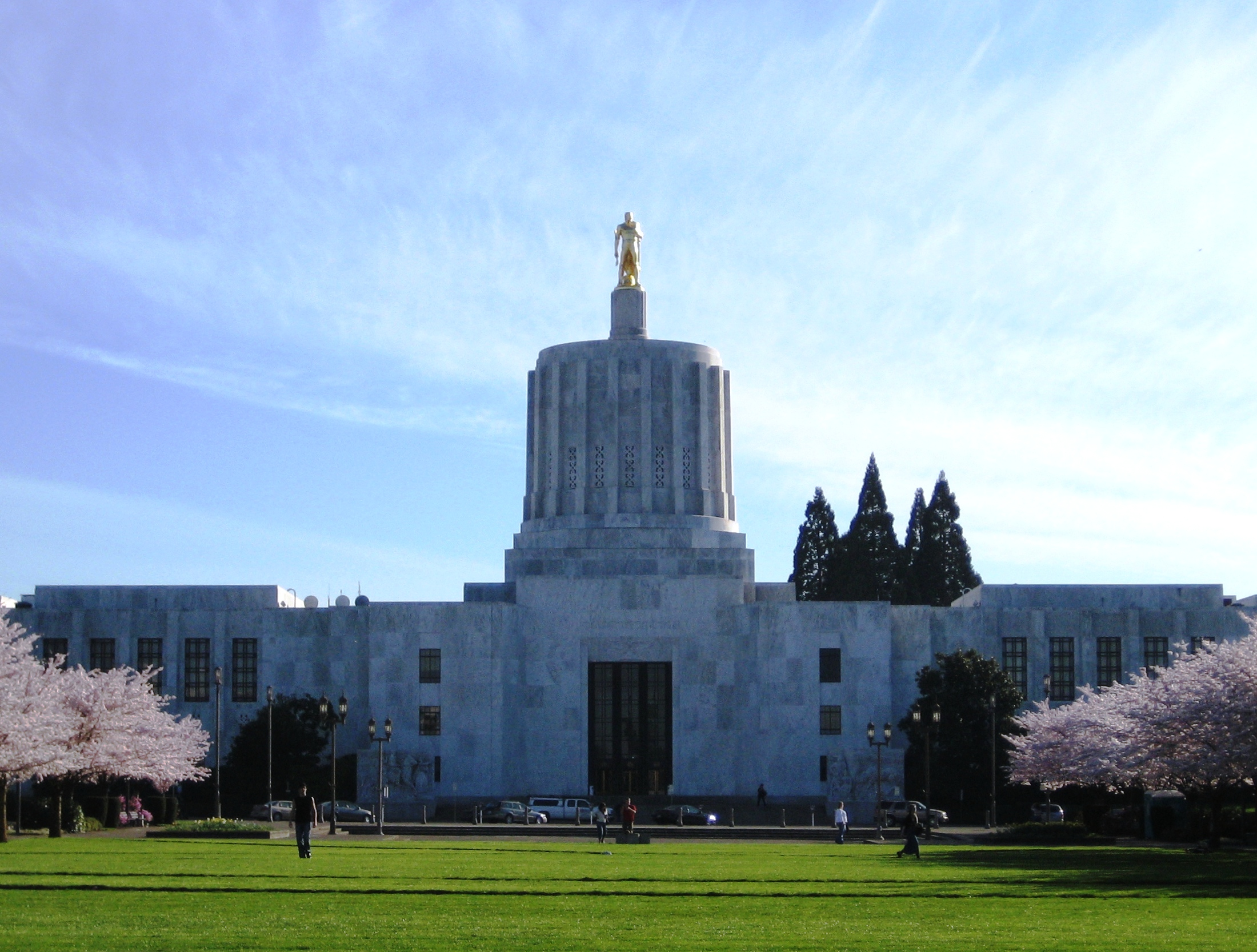
- The legislature took place in the Oregon State Capitol, seen here in 2007

Overview
- Legislative body: Oregon Legislative Assembly
- Jurisdiction: Oregon, United States
- Meeting place: Oregon State Capitol
- Term: 1957
- Website: www.oregonlegislature.gov

Oregon State Senate
- Members: 30 Senators
- Senate President: Boyd R. Overhulse (D)

Oregon House of Representatives
- Members: 60 Representatives
- Speaker of the House: Pat Dooley (D)
- Party control: Democratic Party of Oregon

The 49th Oregon Legislative Assembly was the legislative session of the Oregon Legislative Assembly that convened on January 14 and adjourned May 21, 1957. It also met for a special session from October 28 - November 15 1957 called by Governor Robert D. Holmes in order to lower taxes. A bipartisan compromise would cut 20% of taxes.

== Senate ==
| Affiliation | Members |
| Democratic | 15 |
| Republican | 15 |
| Total | 30 |

== Senate Members ==
Composition of the Senate
| Senator | Residence | Party |
|---|---|---|
| Howard Belton | Canby | Republican |
| Harry D. Boivin | Klamath Falls | Democratic |
| Phil Brady | Portland | Democratic |
| D. C. Cameron | Grants Pass | Republican |
| R. F. Chapman | Coos Bay | Democratic |
| Truman A. Chase | Eugene | Republican |
| Ward H. Cook | Portland | Democratic |
| Alfred H. Corbett | Portland | Democratic |
| D. R. Dimick | Roseburg | Democratic |
| Carl H. Francis | Dayton | Republican |
| Warren Gill | Lebanon | Republican |
| Genard D. Gleason | Portland | Democratic |
| John D. Hare | Hillsboro | Republican |
| Dwight H. Hopkins | Imbler | Democratic |
| Donald R. Husband | Eugene | Republican |
| Walter C. Leith | Monmouth | Republican |
| Jean L. Lewis | Portland | Democratic |
| Philip B. Lowry | Medford | Republican |
| Ben Musa | The Dalles | Democratic |
| Andrew J. Naterlin | Newport | Democratic |
| Lee V. Ohmart | Salem | Republican |
| Boyd R. Overhulse | Madras | Democratic |
| Walter J. Pearson | Portland | Democratic |
| Leander Quiring | Hermiston | Republican |
| Sidney W. Schlesinger | Salem | Republican |
| Monroe Sweetland | Milwaukie | Democratic |
| Dan Thiel | Astoria | Democratic |
| Rudie Wilhelm Jr. | Portland | Republican |
| Anthony Yturri | Ontario | Republican |
| Francis W. Ziegler | Corvallis | Republican |

== House ==
| Affiliation | Members |
| Democratic | 37 |
| Republican | 23 |
| Total | 60 |
| Government Majority | 14 |

== House Members ==
Composition of the House
| House Member | Residence | Party |
|---|---|---|
| Eddie Ahrens | Turner | Republican |
| George J. Annala | Hood River | Democratic |
| Carl Back | Port Orford | Democratic |
| Clarence Barton | Coquille | Democratic |
| Ed Benedict | Portland | Democratic |
| Robert A. Bennett | Portland | Republican |
| Fayette I. Bristol | Grants Pass | Republican |
| Verne N. Cady | Burns | Democratic |
| Herman H. Chindgren | Molalla | Republican |
| Edwin E. Cone | Eugene | Republican |
| Vernon Cook | Gresham | Democratic |
| Joseph S. Crepau | Cottage Grove | Democratic |
| Leon S. Davis | Hillsboro | Republican |
| Pat Dooley | Portland | Democratic |
| Ray Dooley | Portland | Democratic |
| Robert B. Duncan | Medford | Democratic |
| Robert L. Elfstrom | Salem | Republican |
| Harry C. Elliott | Tillamook | Republican |
| Ben Evick | Madras | Democratic |
| Shirley Field | Portland | Republican |
| Roy Fitzwater | Lebanon | Democratic |
| Al Flegel | Roseburg | Democratic |
| Wayne R. Giesy | Monroe | Republican |
| R. E. Goad | Pendleton | Democratic |
| John D. Goss | Portland | Republican |
| William A. Grenfell | Portland | Democratic |
| Richard E. Groener | Milwaukie | Democratic |
| Ole W. Grubb | Bend | Democratic |
| Clinton P. Haight | Baker | Democratic |
| Beluah Hand | Milwaukie | Democratic |
| Stafford M. Hansell (Note: Hansell was appointed to fill the vacancy of Irvin Mann, who died in office.) | Athena | Republican |
| Irvin Mann | Athena | Republican |
| William H. Holmstrom | Gearhart | Democratic |
| Norman R. Howard | Portland | Democratic |
| Winton J. Hunt | Woodburn | Republican |
| Arthur P. Ireland | Forest Grove | Republican |
| V. Edwin Johnson | Eugene | Republican |
| Guy Jonas | Salem | Democratic |
| W. O. Kelsay | Roseburg | Democratic |
| John L. Kerbow | Klamath Falls | Democratic |
| Graham Killiam | Portland | Republican |
| George Layman | Newberg | Republican |
| Berkeley Lent | Portland | Democratic |
| E. A. Littrell | Medford | Republican |
| Thomas R. McClellan | Neotsu | Democratic |
| Fred Meek | Portland | Republican |
| John D. Mosser | Portland | Republican |
| Katherine Musa | The Dalles | Democratic |
| Grace Olivier Peck | Portland | Democratic |
| Joe Rogers | Independence | Democratic |
| Jess W. Savage | Albany | Republican |
| R. E. Schedeen | Gresham | Democratic |
| Keith Skelton | Eugene | Democratic |
| Glen M. Stadler | Eugene | Democratic |
| Emil A. Stunz | Nyssa | Democratic |
| Charles Allen Tom | Rufus | Republican |
| Wayne Turner (Note: Turner was appointed to fill the seat of Robert Klemsen, who resigned.) | St. Helens | Democratic |
| Robert Klemsen | St. Helens | Democratic |
| Harry L. Wells | LaGrande | Democratic |
| Sam Wilderman | Portland | Republican |
| Don S. Willner | Portland | Democratic |
| Carl Yancey | Klamath Falls | Democratic |
