= 51st Oregon Legislative Assembly =

←	50th Legislative Assembly	52nd Legislative Assembly	→
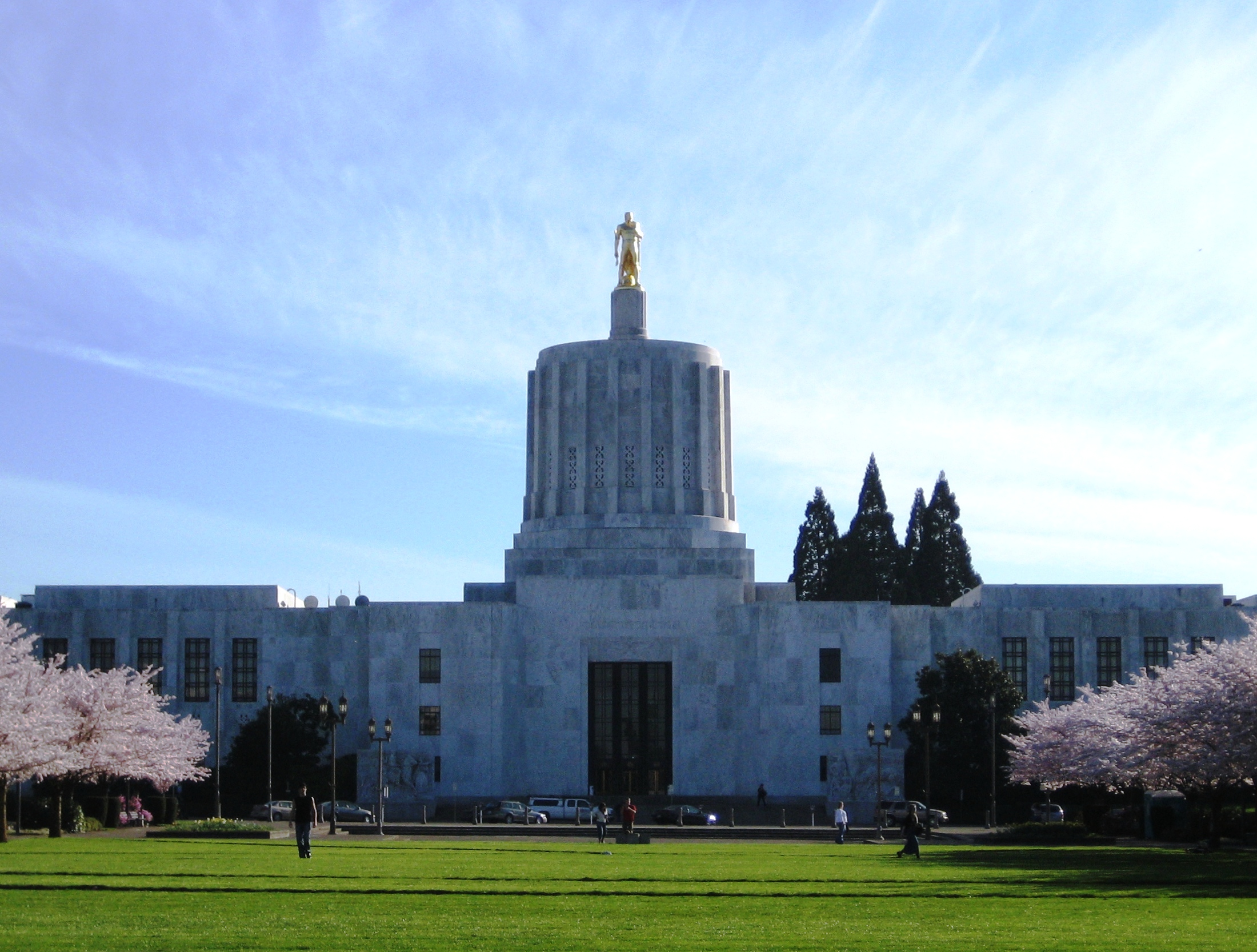
- The legislature took place in the Oregon State Capitol, seen here in 2007

Overview
- Legislative body: Oregon Legislative Assembly
- Jurisdiction: Oregon, United States
- Meeting place: Oregon State Capitol
- Term: 19xx
- Website: www.oregonlegislature.gov

Oregon State Senate
- Members: 30 Senators
- Senate President: Harry D. Boivin (D)
- President Pro Tempore: Jean L. Lewis; Ben Musa (D)
- Party control: Democratic Party of Oregon

Oregon House of Representatives
- Members: 60 Representatives
- Speaker of the House: Robert B. Duncan (D)
- Minority Leader: F. F. Montgomery (R)
- Party control: Democratic Party of Oregon

The 51st Oregon Legislative Assembly was the legislative session of the Oregon Legislative Assembly that convened on January 9, 1961 and adjourned May 10, 1961.

== Senate ==
Affiliation	Members
Democratic	20 (Note: Jean L. Lewis was replaced by Ben Musa; as both were Democrats they are counted as one entity.)
Republican	10
Total	30
Government Majority	10

== Senate Members ==
Composition of the Senate
Senator	Residence	Party
Eddie Ahrens	Salem	Republican
Harry D. Boivin	Klamath Falls	Democratic
R. F. Chapman	Coos Bay	Democratic
Vernon Cook	Gresham	Democratic
Ward Cook	Portland	Democratic
Alfred H. Corbett	Portland	Democratic
Alice Corbett	Portland	Democratic
Al Flegel	Roseburg	Democratic
Carl H. Francis	Dayton	Republican
Melvin Goode	Albany	Republican
William Grenfell	Portland	Democratic
Richard E. Groener	Milwaukie	Democratic
John H. Hare	Hillsboro	Republican
Dwight H. Hopkins	Imbler	Democratic
Donald R. Husband	Eugene	Republican
Lloyd M. Key	Milton-Freewater	Democratic
Walter C. Leith	Salem	Republican
Jean L. Lewis (Note: Served January 9 - March 30)	Portland	Democratic
Thomas R. Mahoney	Portland	Democratic
Ben Musa (Note: Served March 30 - May 10)	The Dalles	Democratic
Andrew J. Naterlin	Newport	Democratic
Lynn W. Newbry	Ashland	Republican
Boyd R. Overhulse	Madras	Democratic
Walter J. Pearson	Portland	Democratic
Eugene "Debbs" Potts	Grants Pass	Democratic
Robert W. Straub	Eugene	Democratic
Monroe Sweetland	Milwaukie	Democratic
Daniel A. Thiel	Astoria	Democratic
Robert F. White	Salem	Republican
Anthony Yturri	Ontario	Republican
Francis W. Ziegler	Corvalis	Republican

== House ==
Affiliation	Members
Democratic	31
Republican	29
Total	60
Government Majority	1

== House Members ==
Composition of the House
House Member	Residence	Party
Gust Anderson	Portland	Republican
George J. Annala	Hood River	Democratic
Victor Atiyeh	Portland	Republican
Carl Back	Port Orford	Democratic
Clarence Barton	Coquille	Democratic
Cornelius C. Bateson	Salem	Democratic
Sidney Bazett	Grants Pass	Republican
Ed Benedict	Portland	Democratic
BIll Bradley	Gresham	Democratic
Kessler R. Cannon	Bend	Republican
Bob Chappel	Portland	Republican
Fritzi Chuinard	Portland	Republican
Leon S. Davis	Hillsboro	Republican
John R. Dellenback	Medford	Republican
Ray Dooley	Portland	Democratic
Robert B. Duncan	Medford	Democratic
Edward W. Elder	Eugene	Republican
Robert L. Elfstrom	Salem	Republican
Harry C. Elliott	Tillamook	Republican
Ben Evick	Madras	Democratic
Richard Eymann	Mohawk	Democratic
Edward Fadeley	Eugene	Democratic
Carlton O. Fisher	Eugene	Republican
George Flitcraft	Klamath Falls	Republican
William J. Gallagher	Portland	Republican
Mel Gordon	Portland	Republican
William F. Gwinn	Albany	Republican
Clinton P. Haight	Baker	Democratic
Beluah J. Hand	Milwaukie	Democratic
Stafford Hansell	Hermiston	Republican
Douglas E. Heider	Salem	Republican
William H. Holmstrom	Gearhart	Democratic
Norman R. Howard	Portland	Democratic
Carrol Howe	Klamath Falls	Republican
C. R. Hoyt	Corvallis	Republican
Winton Hunt	Woodburn	Republican
Arthur P. Ireland	Forest Grove	Republican
W. O. Kelsay	Roseburg	Democratic
Nancy Kirkpatrick	Lebanon	Democratic
Philip D. Lang	Portland	Democratic
George Layman	Newberg	Republican
Sidney Leiken	Roseburg	Democratic
Ken Maher	Portland	Republican
Thomas R. McClellan	Neotsu	Democratic
Don McKinnis	Summerville	Democratic
Tom Monaghan	Milwaukie	Democratic
F. F. Montgomery	Eugene	Republican
Ross Morgan	Gresham	Democratic
Katherine Musa	The Dalles	Democratic
Juanita N. Orr	Lake Grove	Democratic
Grace Olivier Peck	Portland	Democratic
Raphael R. Raymond	Helix	Republican
Joe Rogers	Independence	Republican
Robert F. Smith	Burns	Republican
Emil A. Stunz	Nyssa	Democratic
Wayne Turner	St. Helens	Democratic
George Van Hoomissen	Portland	Democratic
Frank M. Weatherford	Olex	Democratic
Edward J. Whelan	Portland	Democratic
Sam Wilderman	Portland	Republican
