= 50th Oregon Legislative Assembly =

←	49th Legislative Assembly	51st Legislative Assembly	→

Overview
- Legislative body: Oregon Legislative Assembly
- Jurisdiction: Oregon, United States
- Meeting place: Oregon State Capitol
- Term: 1959
- Website: www.oregonlegislature.gov

Oregon State Senate
- Members: 30 Senators
- Senate President: Walter J. Pearson (D)
- Majority Leader: Walter J. Pearson (D)
- Minority Leader: Anthony Yturri (R)
- Party control: Democratic Party of Oregon

Oregon House of Representatives
- Members: 60 Representatives
- Speaker of the House: Robert B. Duncan (D)
- Minority Leader: Robert L. Elfstrom (R)
- Party control: Democratic Party of Oregon

The 50th Oregon Legislative Assembly was the legislative session of the Oregon Legislative Assembly that convened on January 12, 1959, and adjourned May 6, 1959.

== Senate ==
Affiliation	Members
Democratic	19
Republican	11
Total	30
Government Majority	8

== Senate Members ==
Composition of the Senate
Senator	Residence	Party
Eddie Ahrens	Turner	Republican
Harry D. Boivin	Klamath Falls	Democratic
C. D. Cameron	Grants Pass	Republican
R. F. Chapman	Coos Bay	Democratic
Ward H. Cook	Portland	Democratic
Alfred H. Corbett	Portland	Democratic
Alice Corbett	Portland	Democratic
Dan Dimick	Roseburg	Democratic
Edwin Durno	Medford	Republican
Carl H. Francis	Dayton	Republican
Glenard D. Gleason	Portland	Democratic
Melvin Goode	Albany	Republican
William A. Grenfell	Portland	Democratic
Richard E. Groener	Milwaukie	Democratic
John D. Hare	Hillsboro	Republican
Dwight H. Hopkins	Imbler	Democratic
Donald R. Husband	Eugene	Republican
Loyd M. Key	Milton-Freewater	Democratic
Walter C. Leith	Salem	Republican
Jean L. Lewis	Portland	Democratic
Ben Musa	The Dalles	Democratic
Andrew J. Naterlin	Newport	Democratic
Boyd R. Overhulse	Madras	Democratic
Walter J. Pearson	Portland	Democratic
Robert W. Straub	Springfield	Democratic
Monroe Sweetland	Milwaukie	Democratic
Daniel Thiel	Astoria	Democratic
Robert F. White	Salem	Republican
Anthony Yturri	Ontario	Republican
Francis W. Ziegler	Corvallis	Republican

== House ==
Affiliation	Members
Democratic	33
Republican	27
Total	60
Government Majority	5

== House Members ==
Composition of the House
House Member	Residence	Party
Gust Anderson	Portland	Republican
George J. Annala	Hood River	Democratic
Victor Atiyeh	Portland	Republican
Carl Back	Port Orford	Democratic
Clarence Barton	Coquille	Democratic
Edwin E. Benedict	Portland	Democratic
Bill Bradley	Gresham	Democratic
Fayette I. Bristol	Grants Pass	Republican
Verne N. Cady	Burns	Democratic
William W. Chadwick	Salem	Republican
Harold B. Christopher	Portland	Democratic
Vernon Cook	Troutdale	Democratic
Leon S. Davis	Hillsboro	Republican
Ray Dooley	Portland	Democratic
Robert B. Duncan	Medford	Democratic
Robert L. Elfstrom	Salem	Republican
Harry C. Elliot	Tillamook	Republican
Ben Evick	Madras	Democratic
Shirley FIeld	Portland	Republican
Carlton O. Fisher	Eugene	Republican
Roy Fitzwater	Lebanon	Democratic
Al Flegel	Roseburg	Democratic
William J. Gallagher	Portland	Republican
John D. Goss	Portland	Republican
Clinton P. Haight	Baker	Democratic
Beluah J. Hand	Milwaukie	Democratic
Stafford Hansell	Athena	Republican
Douglas E. Heider	Salem	Republican
Earl Hanford Hill	Cushman	Republican
William H. Holmstrom	Gearhart	Democratic
Norman R. Howard	Portland	Democratic
C. R. Hoyt	Corvallis	Republican
Winton Hunt	Woodburn	Republican
Arthur P. Ireland	Forest Grove	Republican
W. O. Kelsay	Roseburg	Democratic
John L. Kerbow	Klamath Falls	Democratic
Nancy Kirkpatrick	Lebanon	Democratic
George Layman	Newberg	Republican
Pat Lonergan	Portland	Republican
Thomas R. McClellan	Neotsu	Democratic
Don McKinnis	Summerville	Democratic
Fred Meek	Portland	Republican
J. Pat Metke	Bend	Republican
Tom Monaghan	Milwaukie	Democratic
F. F. Montgomery	Eugene	Republican
Katherine Musa	The Dalles	Democratic
Evelyn Nye	Medford	Republican
Ed Oakes	Ontario	Republican
Juanita Orr	Lake Grove	Democratic
Grace Olivier Peck	Portland	Democratic
Raphael R. Raymond	Helix	Republican
Joe Rogers	Independence	Republican
Wickes Shaw	Eugene	Democratic
Keith Skelton	Eugene	Democratic
Wayne Turner	St. Helens	Democratic
George Van Hoomissen	Portland	Democratic
Frank M. Weatherford	Olex	Democratic
Edward J. Whelan	Portland	Democratic
Sam Wilderman	Portland	Republican
Carl E. Yancey	Klamath Falls	Democratic
