= 48th Oregon Legislative Assembly =

←	47th Legislative Assembly	49th Legislative Assembly	→
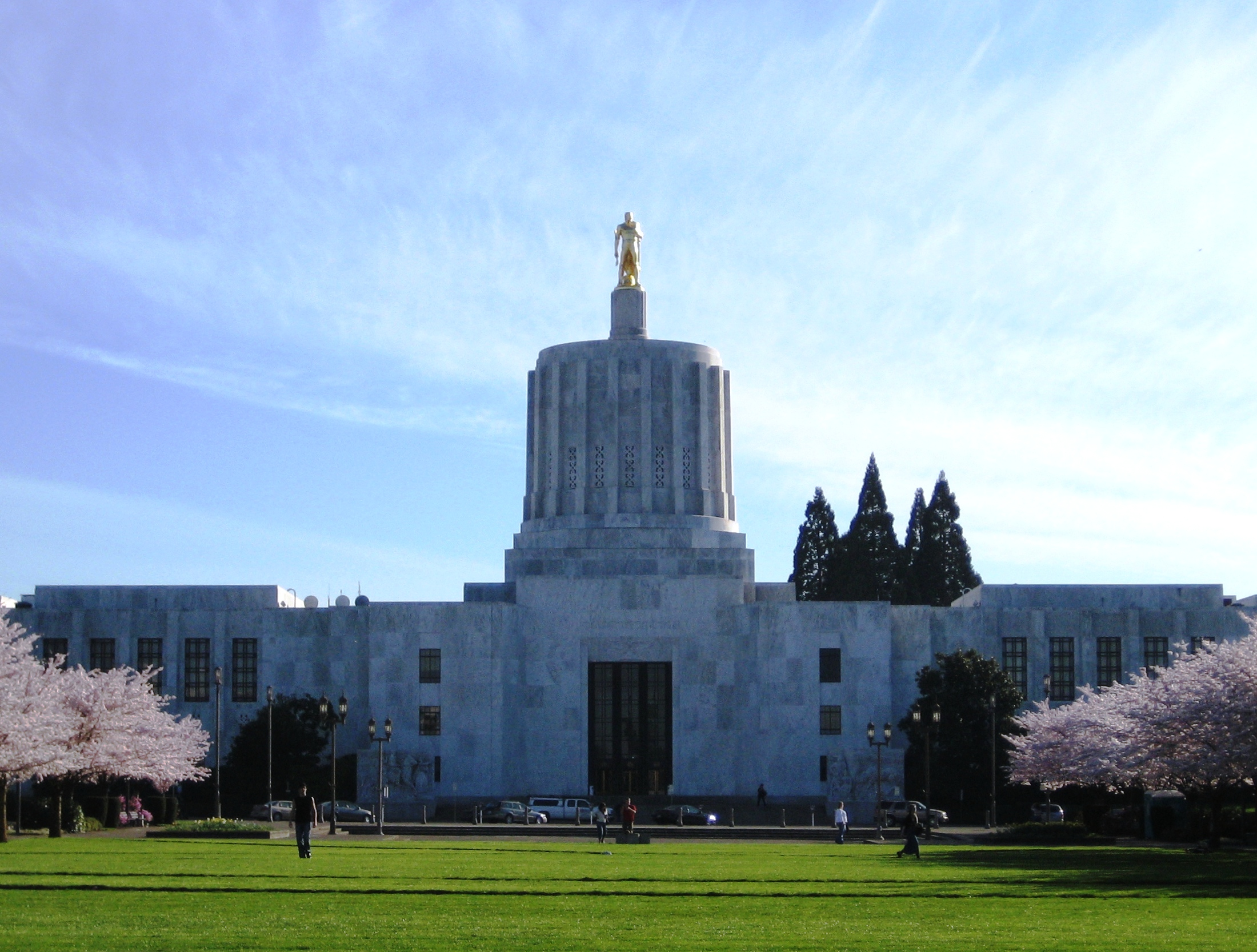
- The legislature took place in the Oregon State Capitol, seen here in 2007

Overview
- Legislative body: Oregon Legislative Assembly
- Jurisdiction: Oregon, United States
- Meeting place: Oregon State Capitol
- Term: 1955
- Website: www.oregonlegislature.gov

Oregon State Senate
- Members: 30 Senators
- Senate President: Elmo E. Smith (R)
- Party control: Republican Party of Oregon

Oregon House of Representatives
- Members: 60 Representatives
- Speaker of the House: Edward A. Geary (R)
- Party control: Republican Party of Oregon

The 48th Oregon Legislative Assembly was the legislative session of the Oregon Legislative Assembly that convened on January 10, 1955 and adjourned May 4, 1955.

== Senate ==
Affiliation	Members
Democratic	6
Republican	24
Total	30
Government Majority	18

== Senate Members ==
Composition of the Senate
Senator	Residence	Party
S. Eugene Allen	Portland	Republican
Howard Belton	Canby	Republican
Charles W. Bingner	LaGrande	Republican
Harry D. Boivin	Klamath Falls	Democratic
Phil Brady	Portland	Democratic
Gene L. Brown	Grants Pass	Republican
Joseph K. Carson (Note: Carson was appointed to Neuberger's seat after Neuberger resigned to assume his seat in the Federal U.S. Senate)	Portland	Democratic
Richard L. Neuberger	Portland	Democratic
Truman A. Chase	Eugene	Republican
Carl H. Francis	Dayton	Republican
Paul E. Geddes	Roseburg	Republican
Harry George Jr.	Portland	Democratic
Warren Gill	Lebanon	Republican
Stewart Hardie	Condon	Republican
Mark Hatfield	Salem	Republican
Robert D. Holmes	Gearhart	Democratic
John P. Hounsell	Hood River	Republican
Donald R. Husband	Eugene	Republican
J. O. Johnson	Tigard	Republican
Walter C. Leth	Monmouth	Republican
Pat Lonergan	Portland	Republican
Philip B. Lowry	Medford	Republican
Warren A. McMinnimee	Tillamook	Republican
John C. F. Merrifield	Portland	Republican
Lee V. Ohmart	Salem	Republican
Elmo Smith	John Day	Republican
W. Lowell Steen	Milton-Freewater	Republican
Monroe Sweetland	Milwaukie	Democratic
George A. Ulett	Coquille	Republican
Rudie Wilhelm	Portland	Republican
Francis W. Ziegler	Corvallis	Republican

== House ==
Affiliation	Members
Democratic	25
Republican	35
Total	60
Government Majority	10

== House Members ==
Composition of the House
House Member	Residence	Party
Eddie Ahrens	Turner	Republican
John P. Amacher	Winchester	Republican
Ben Anderson	Portland	Democratic
Gust Anderson	Portland	Republican
George J. Annala	Hood River	Democratic
William W. Bradeen	Burns	Republican
Edward R. Cardwell	Sweet Home	Republican
W. W. Chadwick	Salem	Republican
R. F. Chapman	Coos Bay	Democratic
Herman H. Chindgren	Molalla	Republican
Edwin Earl Cone	Eugene	Republican
Ward H. Cook	Portland	Democratic
Alfred H. Corbett	Portland	Democratic
F. H. Dammasch	Portland	Republican
Leon S. Davis	Hillsboro	Republican
Harvey H. DeArmond	Bend	Republican
Elmer Deetz	Canby	Republican
Pat Dooley	Portland	Democratic
Orval Eaton	Astoria	Republican
Robert I. Elfstrom	Salem	Republican
Harry C. Elliott	Tillamook	Republican
William J. Gallagher	Portland	Republican
Edward A. Geary	Klamath Falls	Republican
Wayne R. Giesy	Monroe	Republican
G. D. Gleason	Portland	Democratic
R. E. Goad	Pendleton	Democratic
William L. Grenfell	Portland	Democratic
Richard E. Groener	Milwaukie	Democratic
John D. Hare	Hillsboro	Republican
Lloyd E. Haynes	Grants Pass	Republican
Earl H. Hill	Cushman	Republican
Norman R. Howard	Portland	Democratic
Arthur P. Ireland	Forest Grove	Republican
V. T. Jackson	Roseburg	Democratic
Robert J. Jensen	Portland	Republican
V. Edwin Johnson	Eugene	Republican
Robert R. Klemsen	St. Helens	Democratic
George Layman	Newberg	Republican
Jean L. Lewis	Portland	Democratic
E. A. Littrell	Medford	Republican
Al Loucks	Salem	Republican
E. H. Mann	Medford	Republican
Irvin Mann (Note: Irvin Mann died in office. Stafford Hansell was appointed to finish his term. Both were Republicans.)	Adams	Republican
Stafford Hansell	Hermiston	Republican
Thomas R. McClellan	Neotsu	Democratic
Roderick T. McKenzie	Sixes	Republican
Fred Meek	Portland	Republican
Kay Meriwether	Portland	Democratic
Katherine Musa	The Dalles	Democratic
Maurine Neuberger	Portland	Democratic
Boyd R. Overhulse	Madras	Democratic
Walter J. Pearson	Portland	Democratic
Joe Rogers	Independence	Democratic
Jess W. Savage	Albany	Republican
Ernest E. Schrenk	Creswell	Republican
Henry Semon	Klamath Falls	Democratic
Robert J. Steward	Keating	Democratic
Loran L. Stewart	Cottage Grove	Republican
Emil A. Stunz	Nyssa	Democratic
Charles A. Tom	Rufus	Republican
Harry L. Wells	LaGrande	Democratic
