= 47th Oregon Legislative Assembly =

| ← | 46th Legislative Assembly | 48th Legislative Assembly | → |
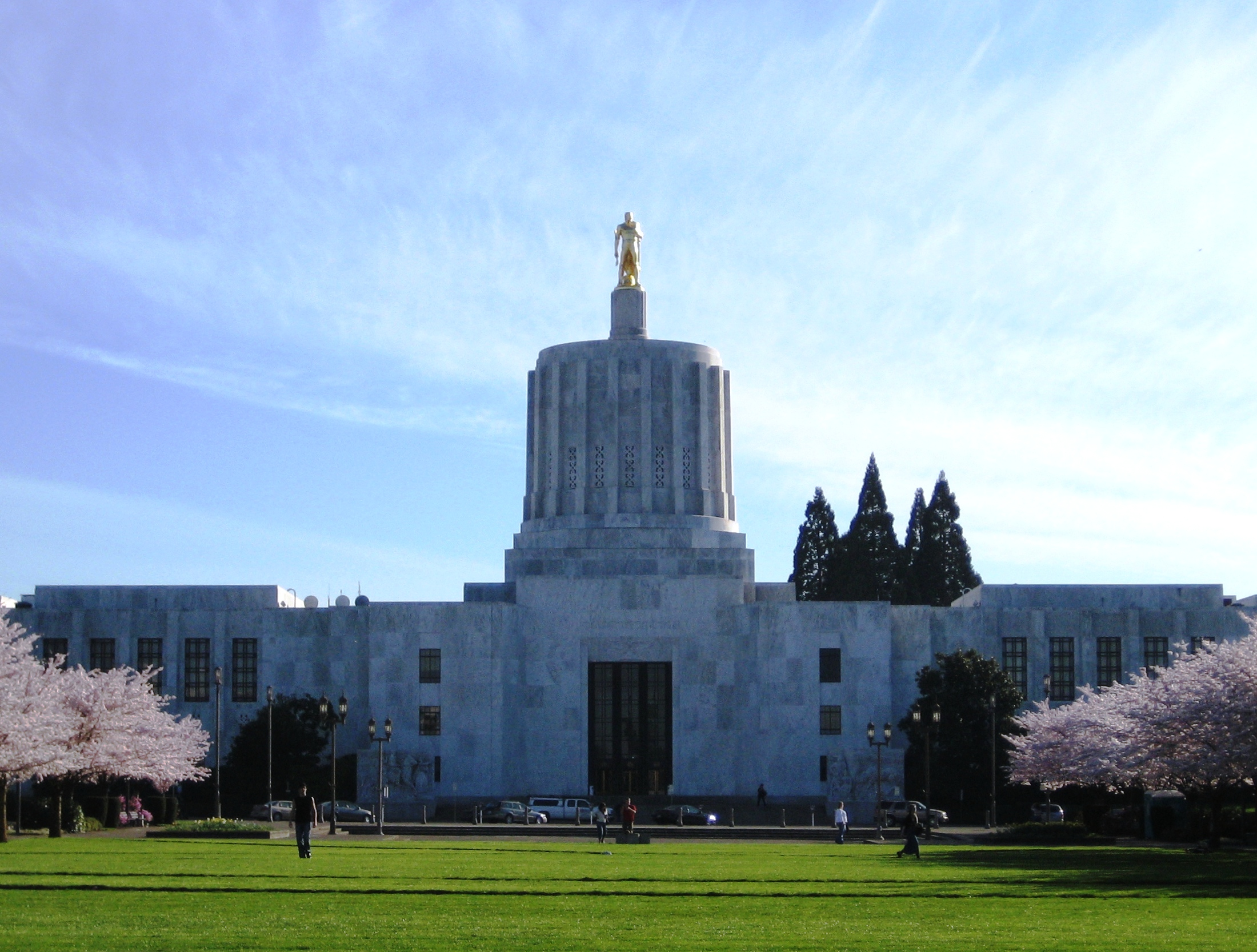
- The legislature took place in the Oregon State Capitol, seen here in 2007

Overview
- Legislative body: Oregon Legislative Assembly
- Jurisdiction: Oregon, United States
- Meeting place: Oregon State Capitol
- Term: 1953
- Website: www.oregonlegislature.gov

Oregon State Senate
- Members: 30 Senators
- Senate President: Eugene E. Marsh (R)
- Party control: Republican Party of Oregon

Oregon House of Representatives
- Members: 60 Representatives
- Speaker of the House: Rudie Wilhelm Jr. (R)
- Party control: Republican Party of Oregon

The 47th Oregon Legislative Assembly was the legislative session of the Oregon Legislative Assembly that convened on January 12, 1953 and adjourned April 21, 1953. A notable piece of legislation was a state wide civil rights bill, signed into law by Republican Governor Paul L. Patterson. Republicans held a supermajority after winning in a landslide 1952 election.

== Senate ==
| Affiliation | Members |
| Democratic | 4 |
| Republican | 26 |
| Total | 30 |
| Government Majority | 22 |

== Senate Members ==
Composition of the Senate
| Senator | Residence | Party |
|---|---|---|
| S. Eugene Allen | Portland | Republican |
| Jack Bain | Portland | Democratic |
| Howard Belton | Canby | Republican |
| Charles W. Bingner | LaGrande | Republican |
| Phil Brady | Portland | Democratic |
| Gene L. Brown | Grants Pass | Republican |
| Dean F. Bryson | Portland | Republican |
| Truman A. Chase | Eugene | Republican |
| Ben Day | Gold Hill | Republican |
| Rex Ellis | Pendleton | Republican |
| Paul E. Geddes | Roseburg | Republican |
| Angus Gibson | Junction City | Republican |
| Walter C. Giersbach | Forest Grove | Republican |
| Warren C. Gill | Lebanon | Republican |
| Stewart Hardie | Condon | Republican |
| Philip S. Hitchcock | Klamath Falls | Republican |
| Robert D. Holmes | Gearhart | Democratic |
| John P. Hounsell | Hood River | Republican |
| Frederick S. Lamport | Salem | Republican |
| Roger Loennig | Haines | Republican |
| Pat Lonergan | Portland | Republican |
| Eugene E. Marsh | McMinnville | Republican |
| Warren A. McMinimee | Tillamook | Republican |
| John C. F. Merrifield | Portland | Republican |
| Richard L. Neuberger | Portland | Democratic |
| Elmo Smith | John Day | Republican |
| W. Lowell Steen | Milton-Freewater | Republican |
| George A. Ulett | Coquille | Republican |
| Dean Walker | Independence | Republican |
| Douglas R. Yeater | Salem | Republican |

== House ==
| Affiliation | Members |
| Democratic | 11 |
| Republican | 49 |
| Total | 60 |
| Government Majority | 38 |

== House Members ==
Composition of the House
| House Member | Residence | Party |
|---|---|---|
| John P. Amacher | Winchester | Republican |
| Gust Anderson | Portland | Republican |
| David C. Baum | LaGrande | Republican |
| William W. Bradeen | Burns | Republican |
| Ed R. Cardwell | Sweet Home | Republican |
| W. W. Chadwick | Salem | Republican |
| Herman H. Chindgren | Molalla | Republican |
| Alfred H. Corbett | Portland | Democratic |
| F. H. Dammasch | Portland | Republican |
| Leon S. Davis | Hillsboro | Republican |
| Richard F. Deich | Portland | Republican |
| Pat Dooley | Portland | Democratic |
| Robert E. Duniway | Portland | Republican |
| Joseph M. Dyer | Astoria | Republican |
| Orval Eaton | Astoria | Republican |
| Robert L. Elfstrom | Salem | Republican |
| Harry C. Elliott | Tillamook | Republican |
| Frank M. Farmer | Rickreall | Republican |
| Carl H. Francis | Dayton | Republican |
| Edward A. Geary | Klamath Falls | Republican |
| R. E. Goad | Pendleton | Democratic |
| Kenneth Goodall | Oswego | Republican |
| Alva Curtis Goodrich | Bend | Republican |
| Claude E. Hall | Waldport | Republican |
| Joseph E. Harvey | Portland | Republican |
| Mark Hatfield | Salem | Republican |
| Lloyd E. Haynes | Grants Pass | Republican |
| Earl H. Hill | Cushman | Republican |
| Russell Hudson | The Dalles | Republican |
| Donald R. Husband | Eugene | Republican |
| V. T. Jackson | Roseburg | Democratic |
| Robert J. Jensen | Portland | Republican |
| Robert R. Klemsen | St. Helens | Democratic |
| Ivan C. Laird | Sitkum | Democratic |
| George Layman | Newberg | Republican |
| Carroll Locey | Ironside | Republican |
| E. H. Mann | Medford | Republican |
| Roderick T. McKenzie | Sixes | Republican |
| John Misko | Oregon City | Republican |
| Earl A. Moore | Hood River | Republican |
| G. Russell Morgan | Hillsboro | Republican |
| Maurine Neuberger | Portland | Democratic |
| Lee V. Ohmart | Salem | Republican |
| Boyd R. Overhulse | Madras | Democratic |
| Robert W. Root | Medford | Republican |
| Phil J. Roth | Portland | Republican |
| Jess W. Savage | Albany | Republican |
| Ralph Saylor | Echo | Republican |
| Henry Semon | Klamath Falls | Democratic |
| J. P. Steiwer | Fossil | Republican |
| Robert J. Steward | Keating | Democratic |
| Loran L. Stewart | Cottage Grove | Republican |
| B. A. Stover | Bend | Republican |
| Monroe Sweetland | Milwaukie | Democratic |
| Charles Allen Tom | Rufus | Republican |
| Dorothy Wallace | Portland | Republican |
| H. R. Weatherford | Wallowa | Republican |
| Harvey Wells | Portland | Republican |
| Rudie Wilhelm | Portland | Republican |
| Francis W. Ziegler | Corvallis | Republican |
