= 46th Oregon Legislative Assembly =

←	45th Legislative Assembly	47th Legislative Assembly	→
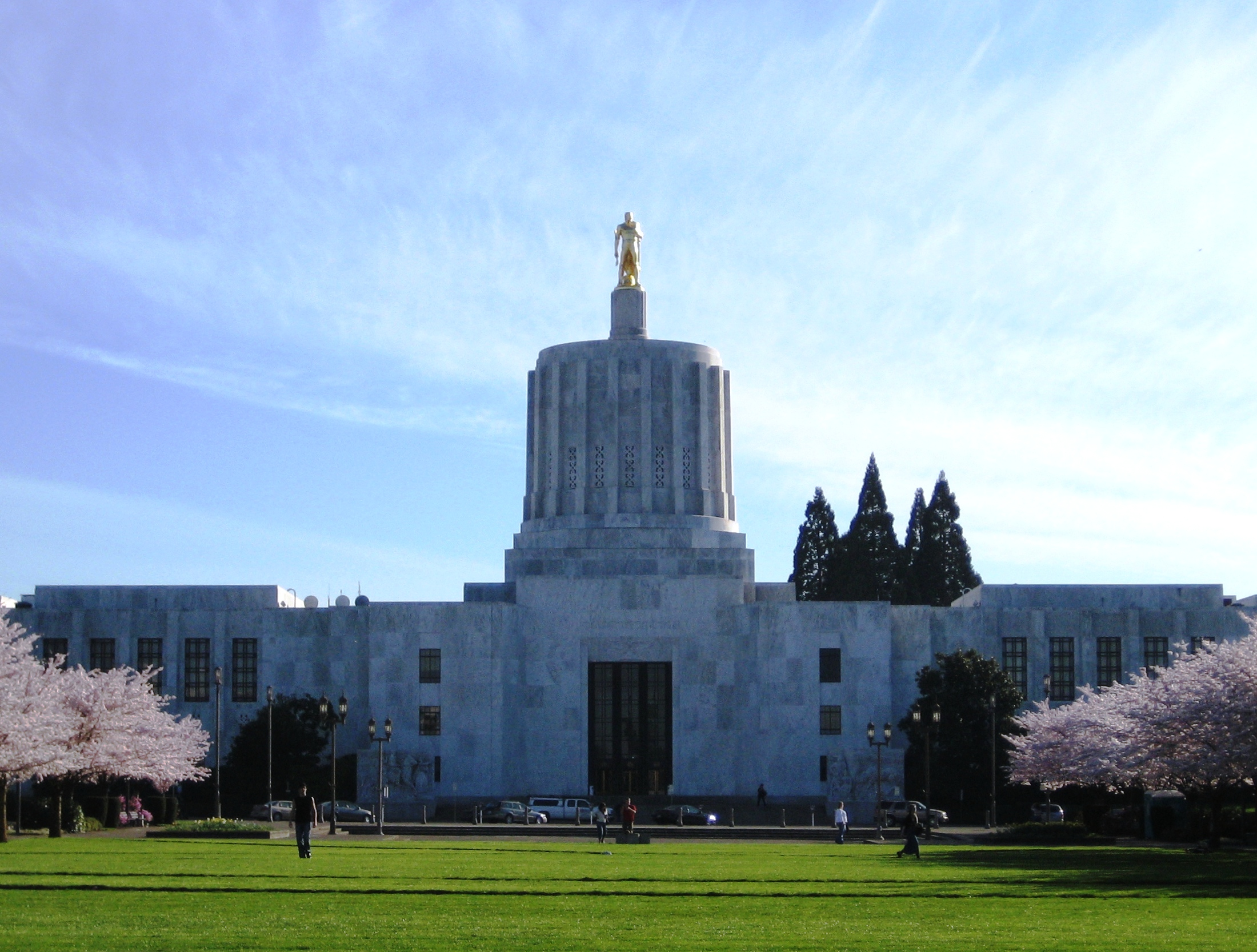
- The legislature took place in the Oregon State Capitol, seen here in 2007

Overview
- Legislative body: Oregon Legislative Assembly
- Jurisdiction: Oregon, United States
- Meeting place: Oregon State Capitol
- Term: 1951
- Website: www.oregonlegislature.gov

Oregon State Senate
- Members: 27 Senators
- Party control: Republican Party of Oregon

Oregon House of Representatives
- Members: 60 Representatives
- Speaker of the House: John F. Steelhammer (R)
- Party control: Republican Party of Oregon

The 46th Oregon Legislative Assembly was the legislative session of the Oregon Legislative Assembly that convened on January 8, 1951 and adjourned May 3, 1951. A notable bill passed this session banned self serving gas stations. In 1950, Senator Richard L. Neuberger and Representative Maurine Neuberger would become the first married couple to be simultaneously elected to both chambers of the Oregon Legislature.

== Senate ==
Affiliation	Members
Democratic	6
Republican	21
Total	27
Government Majority	15

=== Senate Members ===
Composition of the Senate
Senator	Residence	Party
Truman A. Chase	Eugene	Republican
Sam Coon	Keating	Republican
Ben Day	Gold Hill	Republican
Rex Ellis	Pendleton	Republican
Carl Engdahl	Pendleton	Republican
Arthur Lindberg (Note: When Engdahl died in March 24 1951, Lindberg was appointed to his seat. Both were Republicans.)	Pendleton	Republican
Russell L. Gardner	Newport	Democratic
Angus Gibson	Junction City	Republican
Warren C. Gill	Lebanon	Republican
Stewart Hardie	Condon	Republican
Frank H. Hilton	Portland	Republican
Philip S. Hitchcock	Klamath Falls	Republican
Robert D. Holmes	Gearhart	Democratic
Frederick S. Lamport	Salem	Republican
J. J. Lynch	Portland	Republican
Thomas R. Mahoney	Portland	Democratic
Eugene E. Marsh	McMinnville	Republican
Ben Musa	The Dalles	Democratic
Richard L. Neuberger	Portland	Democratic
Thomas Parkinson	Roseburg	Republican
Paul L. Patterson	Hillsboro	Republican
Elmo Smith	John Day	Republican
Dean Walker	Independence	Republican
William Walsh	Coos Bay	Republican
Marie E. Wilcox	Grants Pass	Republican
Manley J. Wilson	Warren	Democratic
Douglas R. Yeater	Salem	Republican

== House ==
Affiliation	Members
Democratic	10
Republican	50
Total	60
Government Majority	40

== House Members ==
Composition of the House
House Member	Residence	Party
Fred W. Adams	Ophir	Republican
Gust Anderson	Portland	Republican
David C. Baum	LaGrande	Republican
William W. Bradeen	Burns	Republican
Ed R. Cardwell	Sweet Home	Republican
Sprague H. Carter	Pendleton	Republican
Herman H. Chindgren	Molalla	Republican
Raymond C. Coulter	Grants Pass	Republican
Lloyd R. Crosby	Milwaukie	Republican
Elliott B. Cummins	McMinnville	Republican
F. H. Dammasch	Portland	Republican
John Dickson	Portland	Republican
Joseph M. Dyer	Astoria	Republican
Orval Eaton	Astoria	Republican
Dean H. Erwin	Enterprise	Republican
Frank M. Farmer	Rickreall	Republican
Earl E. Fisher	Beaverton	Republican
Harry C. Elliott	Tillamook	Republican
Carl H. Francis	Dayton	Republican
Giles L. French	Moro	Republican
Edward A. Geary	Klamath Falls	Republican
Paul E. Geddes	Roseburg	Republican
G. D. Gleason	Portland	Democratic
Melvin Goode	Albany	Republican
Alva Curtis Goodrich	Bend	Republican
J. S. Greenwood	Wemme	Republican
Joseph E. Harvey	Portland	Republican
Mark Hatfield	Salem	Republican
Lloyd E. Haynes	Grants Pass	Republican
Earl H. Hill	Cushman	Republican
Russell Hudson	The Dalles	Republican
Donald R. Husband	Eugene	Republican
E. J. Ireland	Molalla	Republican
V. T. Jackson	Roseburg	Democratic
J. O. Johnson	Tigard	Republican
Graham Killam	Portland	Republican
Robert R. Klemsen	St. Helens	Democratic
Kenneth Kraemer	Portland	Democratic
Ivan C. Laird	Sitkum	Democratic
Roger Leonning	Haines	Republican
C. L. Lieuallen	Pendleton	Republican
Carroll Locey	Ironside	Republican
John D. Logan	Portland	Republican
Pat Lonergan	Portland	Republican
E. H. Mann	Medford	Republican
Maurine Neuberger	Portland	Democratic
Lee V. Ohmart	Salem	Republican
Boyd R. Overhulse	Madras	Democratic
Henry E. Peterson	Ione	Republican
Stanhope S. Pier	Portland	Republican
Robert W. Root	Medford	Republican
Henry Semon	Klamath Falls	Democratic
John F. Steelhammer	Salem	Republican
Loran L. Stewart	Cottage Grove	Republican
B. A. Stover	Bend	Republican
Robert Y. Thornton	Tillamook	Democratic
Gerald Wade	Newport	Republican
Harvey Wells	Portland	Republican
Rudie Wilhelm	Portland	Republican
Francis W. Ziegler	Corvallis	Republican
