= 1966 Oregon State Senate election =

- November 8, 1966

16 of 30 seats in the Oregon State Senate (15 regular, 1 unexpired) 16 seats needed for a majority
	Majority party	Minority party
Leader	Harry D. Boivin	Robert Elfstrom
Party	Democratic	Republican
Leader's seat	15th district	1st district
Seats before	19	11
Seats won	9	7
Seats after	19	11
Popular vote	690,960	573,315
Percentage	54.65%	45.34%
- Results by party Democratic gain Democratic hold Republican gain Republican hold No election
Senate President before election
Harry D. Boivin
Democratic
Elected Senate President
Debbs Potts
Democratic

Elections to the Oregon State Senate were held on November 8, 1966, to elect 15 candidates to the Senate to serve four-year terms, and one to fill the two-year remainder of an unexpired term. The Democratic Party won 9 seats to the Republicans' 7, resulting in a Senate composition of 19 Democrats and 11 Republicans, with no net gains for either party. The coalition of Republicans and conservative Democrats remained in power, electing Debbs Potts as Senate President, winning 17 votes to 12 against the leader of the liberal faction, Democrat Al Flegel.

This election used the same district boundaries used for the 1962 and 1964 general elections passed after the 1960 U.S. census. However, after the passing of a 1965 law, senators in multi-member districts were elected to designated single-member positions for the first time, as opposed to plurality block voting which had been used previously. Incumbent senators in multi-member districts were assigned numbers based on their vote totals at their most recent general election, with the highest voted candidate getting position 1, second-highest position 2, and so on.

== Summary ==
Partisan makeup following the 1964 election
Republican
Democratic
Split delegation

Partisan makeup following the 1966 election
Republican
Democratic
Split delegation

== District 1 ==
Senate District 1 contained all of Marion County and elected two senators.

District 1 position 1 election
Party	Candidate	Votes	%
Republican	Robert L. Elfstrom (incumbent)	29,107	67.01%
Democratic	Spencer Grew	14,309	32.94%
Write-in		21	0.05%
Total votes		43,437	100.00%

District 1 position 2 election
Party	Candidate	Votes	%
Democratic	Cornelius C. Bateson	24,874	55.82%
Republican	Eddie Ahrens (incumbent)	19,687	44.18%
Write-in		2	0.00%
Total votes		44,563	100.00%
Democratic gain from Republican			

== District 2 ==
Senate District 2 contained all of Linn County and elected one senator.

District 2 election
Party	Candidate	Votes	%
Democratic	Glenn Huston (incumbent)	12,067	60.52%
Republican	Kenneth J. Purdy	7,871	39.48%
Total votes		19,938	100.00%

== District 3 ==
Senate District 3 contained all of Lane County and elected three senators.

District 3 position 1 election
Party	Candidate	Votes	%
Democratic	Edward N. Fadeley (incumbent)	39,398	61.04%
Republican	John V. Northam	25,141	38.95%
Write-in		3	0.00%
Total votes		64,542	100.00%

District 3 position 2 election
Party	Candidate	Votes	%
Republican	Donald R. Husband (incumbent)	36,071	55.45%
Democratic	Lynn Moore	28,977	44.55%
Write-in		2	0.00%
Total votes		65,050	100.00%

District 3 position 3 election
Party	Candidate	Votes	%
Democratic	Glenn M. Stadler (incumbent)	33,688	56.56%
Republican	Thelma Chapman Fowler	25,872	43.44%
Write-in		3	0.01%
Total votes		59,563	100.00%

== District 5 ==
Senate District 5 contained all of Jackson County and elected one senator.

District 5 election
Party	Candidate	Votes	%
Republican	L. W. Newbry (incumbent)	17,777	62.47%
Democratic	Hugh G. Simpson	10,680	37.53%
Total votes		28,457	100.00%

== District 8 ==
Senate District 8 contained all of Washington and Yamhill counties and elected one senator.

District 8 election
Party	Candidate	Votes	%
Republican	Arthur P. Ireland (incumbent)	28,826	50.89%
Democratic	Blaine Whipple	27,818	49.11%
Total votes		56,644	100.00%

== District 10 ==
Senate District 10 contained all of Benton and Polk counties and elected one senator.

District 10 election
Party	Candidate	Votes	%
Republican	Walter Leth (incumbent)	20,429	99.89%
Write-in		22	0.11%
Total votes		20,451	100.00%

== District 11 ==
Senate District 11 contained all of Clackamas County and elected two senators.

District 11 position 1 election
Party	Candidate	Votes	%
Republican	John J. Inskeep (incumbent)	26,748	56.31%
Democratic	Beulah Hand	20,754	43.69%
Write-in		2	0.00%
Total votes		47,504	100.00%

District 11 position 2 election
Party	Candidate	Votes	%
Republican	George Eivers	23,169	50.63%
Democratic	Richard E. Groener	22,589	49.37%
Total votes		45,758	100.00%
Republican gain from Democratic			

== District 12 ==
Senate District 12 contained all of Multnomah County and elected eight senators, five during presidential election years and three during midterm election years. A special election to fill the remaining two years of Walter J. Pearson was also held after he vacated his seat due to ill health.

District 12 position 2 election (2-year term)
Party	Candidate	Votes	%
Democratic	Berkeley Lent	105,618	56.12%
Republican	Wallace L. Lee	82,590	43.88%
Write-in		9	0.00%
Total votes		188,217	100.00%
Democratic hold			

District 12 position 6 election
Party	Candidate	Votes	%
Democratic	Ross Morgan	113,957	61.57%
Republican	A. V. Miller	71,113	38.42%
Write-in		8	0.00%
Total votes		185,078	100.00%
Democratic hold			

District 12 position 7 election
Party	Candidate	Votes	%
Democratic	Ted Hallock (incumbent)	109,557	56.45%
Republican	Shirley Field	84,509	43.54%
Write-in		9	0.00%
Total votes		194,075	100.00%

District 12 position 8 election
Party	Candidate	Votes	%
Democratic	John D. Burns	110,056	59.66%
Republican	James M. Simmons	74,405	40.34%
Write-in		4	0.00%
Total votes		184,465	100.00%
Democratic hold			

== District 14 ==
Senate District 14 contained all of Clatsop and Columbia counties and elected one senator.

District 14 election
Party	Candidate	Votes	%
Democratic	Dan A. Thiel (incumbent)	16,618	99.84%
Write-in		27	0.16%
Total votes		16,645	100.00%

== See also ==
- 1966 Oregon gubernatorial election
- List of Oregon Legislative Assemblies
