= USS LST-357 =

Tank landing ship of the United States Navy

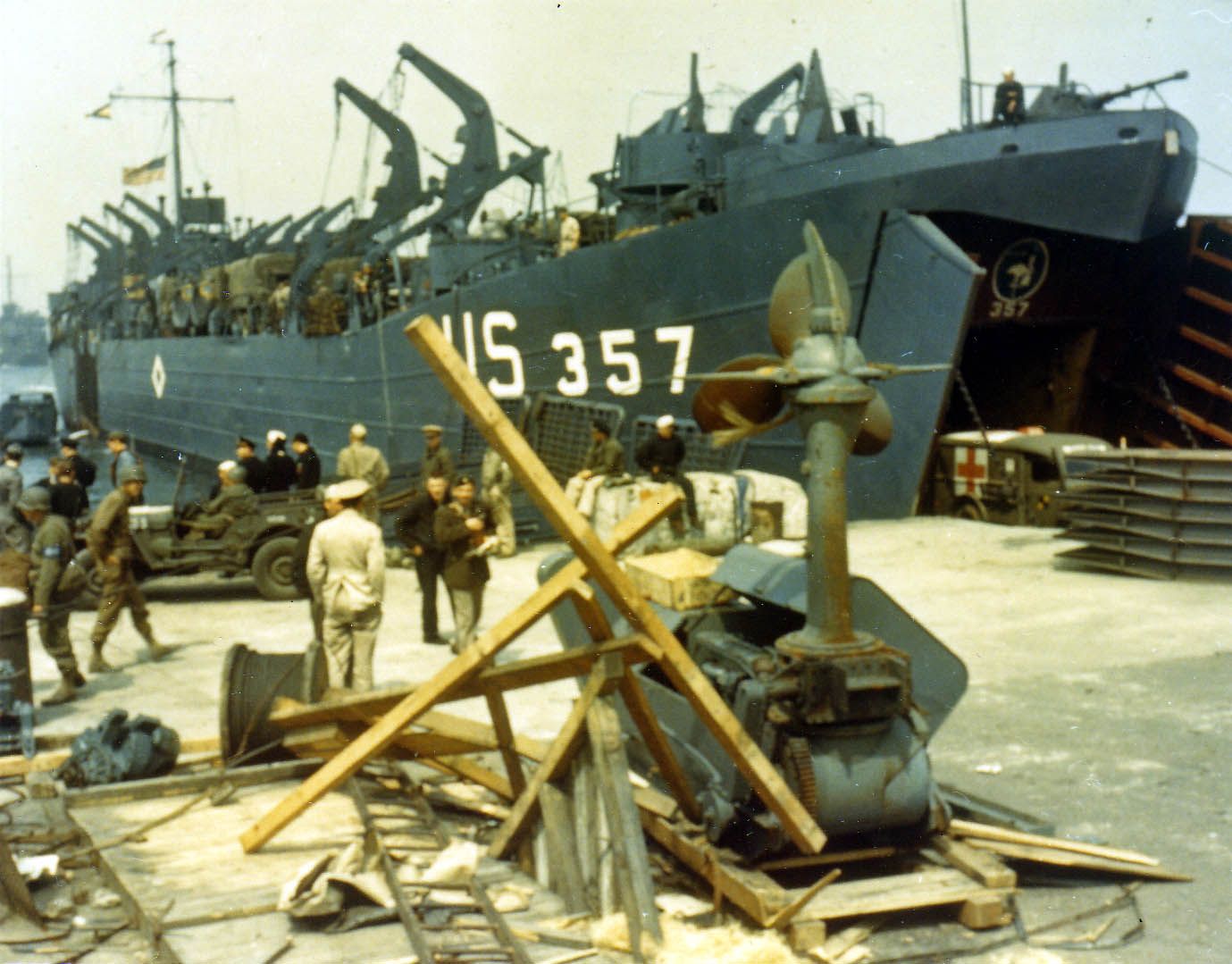
- LST-357 loading vehicles before the Normandy invasion

History

United States
- Name: USS LST-357
- Builder: Charleston Navy Yard
- Laid down: 24 October 1942
- Launched: 16 November 1942
- Commissioned: 8 February 1943
- Decommissioned: 8 June 1946
- Stricken: 31 July 1946
- Honours and awards: 3 battle stars
- Fate: Sold for scrap, 1 April 1948

General characteristics
- Class & type: LST-1-class tank landing ship
- Displacement: 4,080 long tons (4,145 t) full
- Length: 328 ft (100 m)
- Beam: 50 ft (15 m)
- Draft: Light : 2 ft 4 in (0.71 m) forward; 7 ft 6 in (2.29 m) aft; Sea-going : 8 ft 3 in (2.51 m) forward; 14 ft 1 in (4.29 m) aft; Landing : 3 ft 11 in (1.19 m) forward; 9 ft 10 in (3.00 m) aft
- Propulsion: 2 × General Motors 900 hp (671 kW) 12-567 diesel engines, 2 shafts, twin rudders
- Speed: 12 knots (22 km/h; 14 mph)
- Range: 24,000 nmi (44,000 km) at 9 kn (17 km/h; 10 mph) while displacing 3960 tons
- Complement: 9 officers, 120 enlisted
- Armament: 2 × twin 40 mm gun mounts w/Mk.51 directors; 4 × single 40 mm gun mounts; 12 × single 20 mm gun mounts

USS LST-357 was an LST-1-class tank landing ship of the United States Navy active during the Second World War. Whilst never formally named, she was nicknamed Palermo Pete by her crew.

== Service history ==
She was laid down in October 1942 at the Charleston Navy Yard, and commissioned in February 1943.

LST-357 first saw action at the invasion of Sicily in July 1943. During the Salerno landings on 9 September, a crew of just under 150 of all ranks took some 90 casualties. One crew member, Warren C. Gill, was awarded the Navy Cross for his actions, making him one of just six Coast Guardsmen to be awarded the Navy Cross during World War II.

In 1944 she moved to England for the Normandy landings, landing on Omaha Beach on D-Day.

Following the end of the war, she served on occupation duties in the Far East, before being decommissioned in June 1946 and sold for scrapping in April 1948.
