= Oregon Society of Certified Public Accountants =

- Abbreviation: OSCPA
- Formation: 1908
- Type: Professional Association
- Headquarters: Beaverton, Oregon, United States
- Members: Certified Public Accountants
- Official language: English
- CEO: Sherri McPherson, CAE
- Website: www.orcpa.org

The Oregon Society of Certified Public Accountants (OSCPA) founded in 1908, is a professional association based in the U.S. state of Oregon with nearly 4,000 members statewide, as well as in other states and countries.

The OSCPA is committed to the continuing professional success of its members. The OSCPA is a voluntary association of Certified Public Accountants (CPAs) engaged in public practice, industry, government, and education. In addition, prospective CPAs may hold membership as affiliate members.

Regular members of the Society are generally holders of the Certified Public Accountant certificate issued by the State of Oregon, or by other states provided certain eligibility requirements have been met. Affiliate membership in the society includes students, CPA candidates, inactive, and uncertified associate members.

The current chief executive of OSCPA is Sherri McPherson.

== See also ==
- American Institute of Certified Public Accountants
