= Ben Musa =

American politician

- State Senator Ben Musa, 1963

44th President of the Oregon State Senate
- In office 1963–1964
- Preceded by: Harry D. Boivin
- Succeeded by: Harry D. Boivin

Member of the Oregon Senate from the 16th and 18th district
- In office 1949–1952; 1957–1968
- Preceded by: Peter J. Stadelman; John P. Hounsell
- Succeeded by: John P. Hounsell; Kenneth A. Jernstedt
- Constituency: Hood River and Wasco (1949–1952); Gilliam, Hood River, Morrow, Sherman, Wasco, and Wheeler (1957–1968)

Personal details
- Born: 20 August 1905 Boring, Oregon, U.S.
- Died: 19 May 1974 (aged 68) The Dalles, Oregon, U.S.
- Party: Democratic
- Spouse: Katherine Musa
- Profession: Certified Public Accountant

Benjamin M. Musa (20 August 1905 – 19 May 1974) was an American politician who served four terms in the Oregon State Senate between 1949 and 1968, including serving as President of the Oregon Senate during the 1963–1964 legislative term. A CPA (Certified Public Accountant), he was a conservative Democrat from a rural district, known for his ability to work with Republicans as well as fellow Democrats in the state senate. Musa ran for governor in 1966, but lost the Democratic primary to Robert W. Straub.

== Early life ==
Musa was born on 20 August 1905 in Boring, Oregon. His parents, John and Maria Musa, were both immigrants from Germany. He attended school in Clackamas County including Gresham High School. The family moved to Portland, Oregon in the 1920s. Musa then attended a business college in Multnomah County, Oregon. During that period, he was elected president of Young Democrats of Multnomah County and served as secretary of Oregon Young Democrats.

After finishing business school, Musa work for Portland General Electric and Portland Traction Company for ten years. In 1936, he became deputy collector for the Internal Revenue Service in Central Oregon. In 1943, he opened a private practice as a Certified Public Accountant in The Dalles, Oregon. He was a member of the American Institute of Certified Public Accountants and the Oregon Society of Certified Public Accountants. He was the treasurer for the Wasco County Red Cross chapter, chairman of The Dalles Planning Commission, and director of The Dalles Chamber of Commerce. He was also active in the Wasco United Fund and the local Kiwanis Club.

== State senator ==
Musa, a Democrat, was elected to the Oregon State Senate in 1948, representing Hood River and Wasco counties. His district was later expanded to include four additional eastern Oregon counties. He served in the senate for a total of 16 years, completing his last session in 1967 (though his final term lasted through 1968). During his tenure in the senate, he was widely recognized as an expert on tax and revenue issues. In addition, Musa's wife, Katherine Musa, was a member of the Oregon House of Representatives from 1955 through 1966, representing approximately half his senate district in Oregon's lower legislative house.

Musa first won election to Oregon's District 16 senate seat in 1948. His first four-year term included two sessions, one in 1949 and the other in 1951. The first session lasted for approximately three months and the second session lasted just under four months. During the 1951 session, Musa sponsored a bill that provided the funds necessary to erect statues of John McLoughlin and Jason Lee in Statuary Hall at the United States Capitol in Washington.

In 1952, Musa decided not to run for re-election in his state senate district. Instead, he ran for the open United States House of Representatives seat in Oregon's 2nd congressional district, representing eastern Oregon. Musa lost in the Democratic primary to John G. Jones. In the primary, Musa received 10,496 votes while Jones got 15,712. After the election, Musa went back to his accounting practice in The Dalles. However, Musa remained active in politics, serving as chairman of the Jones for Congress Campaign Committee in Hood River and Wasco counties.

In 1956, Musa decided to run for his old senate seat. He re-captured the District 16 senate seat, defeating incumbent John Hounsell. This allowed Musa to represent the district in the 1957 regular legislative session plus a short special session later that year as well as the 1959 regular session. During those sessions, he served as chairman of State and Federal Affairs Committee and vice chairman of the Assessment and Taxation Committee. He was also a member of the Local Government Committee and the Public Welfare and Institutions Committee.

In 1960, Musa is re-elected, beating George Stadelman in a close race. Musa received 9,752 votes while Stadelman got 9,617. After the election, Democrats held a 20 to 10 majority in the state senate. However, Musa joined a group of conservative Democrat who with the help of the Republican minority took control of the senate. The coalition elected Harry D. Boivin, a conservative Democrat, as the senate president over the Democratic majority leader Alfred H. Corbett. Boivin selected Musa to chair the Taxation Committee. Musa also served as a member of the Resolutions Committee, Education Committee, and Elections Committee which was responsible for re-drawing Oregon's legislative and Congressional boundaries based on the 1960 census. Midway through the session, the president pro-tem of the senate resigned and Musa was unanimously elected to the post by his colleagues.

== President of the Senate ==
In the 1963 legislative session, Musa and other conservative Democrats joined the Republican minority once again to control the state senate. This time, the coalition elected Musa as the senate president. Musa then appointed conservative Democrats to chair key committees with most of the other committee chairmanships going to Republicans.

Under Musa's leadership, the state senate defeated a proposed change to the state constitution that would have done away with state boards and commissions while giving the governor executive authority over most state operations. He also helped pass a balanced state budget, and led the successful effort to defeat an initiative to create a state sales tax. After the session ended, Musa was elected chairman of the joint legislative Emergency Board. The board provided legislative oversight for state government operation while the legislature was out of session.

At that time, the President of the Senate served as acting governor whenever the elected governor was out of the state. During 1963, Republican Governor Mark Hatfield was out of the state a total of 65 days and Musa served as acting governor. Musa created a controversy when, as acting governor, he appointed a Democrat from his district to the state Public Welfare Commission. The appointment was legal, but Hatfield and many of the state's media outlets criticized Musa for making the appointment.

In October 1963, Oregon voters defeated a proposed tax increase. This created a $60 million gap in the previously balance state budget. As a result, Governor Hatfield called a special session of the legislature to make the cuts necessary to re-balance the budget. Ten legislative leaders met with the governor prior to the special session to discuss options for balancing the budget. Nine favored allowing the governor to make the cut. Musa was the only legislative leader to disagree. He believed it was the legislature's responsibility to make the cuts. The special session was interrupted by a nine-day recess following the assassination of President John F. Kennedy. The special session took 22 days (including the 9-day recess). At that time, it was the longest special legislative session in Oregon history.

== Final term ==
In 1964, Musa ran for re-election and won a fourth term in the state senate. This allowed him to serve in the 1965 regular legislative session as well as a short special session that took place in May 1965, a week after the regular session adjourned. In 1966, Musa ran for governor. During the campaign, he highlighted his service in the state senate including his time as acting governor along with his experience resolving complex tax and revenue issues. Musa lost the Democratic primary to Robert Straub. After the election, Musa returned to the state senate for the second half of his four-year term, where he participated the 1967 regular session. While that session ended in June 1967, his term of office continued through the end of 1968.

== Later life ==
After leaving the state Senate, Musa went back to his public accounting practice in The Dalles. In October 1973, he suffered a serious brain hemorrhage. He died seven month later on 19 May 1974 in The Dalles at the age of 68. Musa was interred at the Odd Fellows Cemetery in The Dalles.
