= Rufus, Oregon =

- City
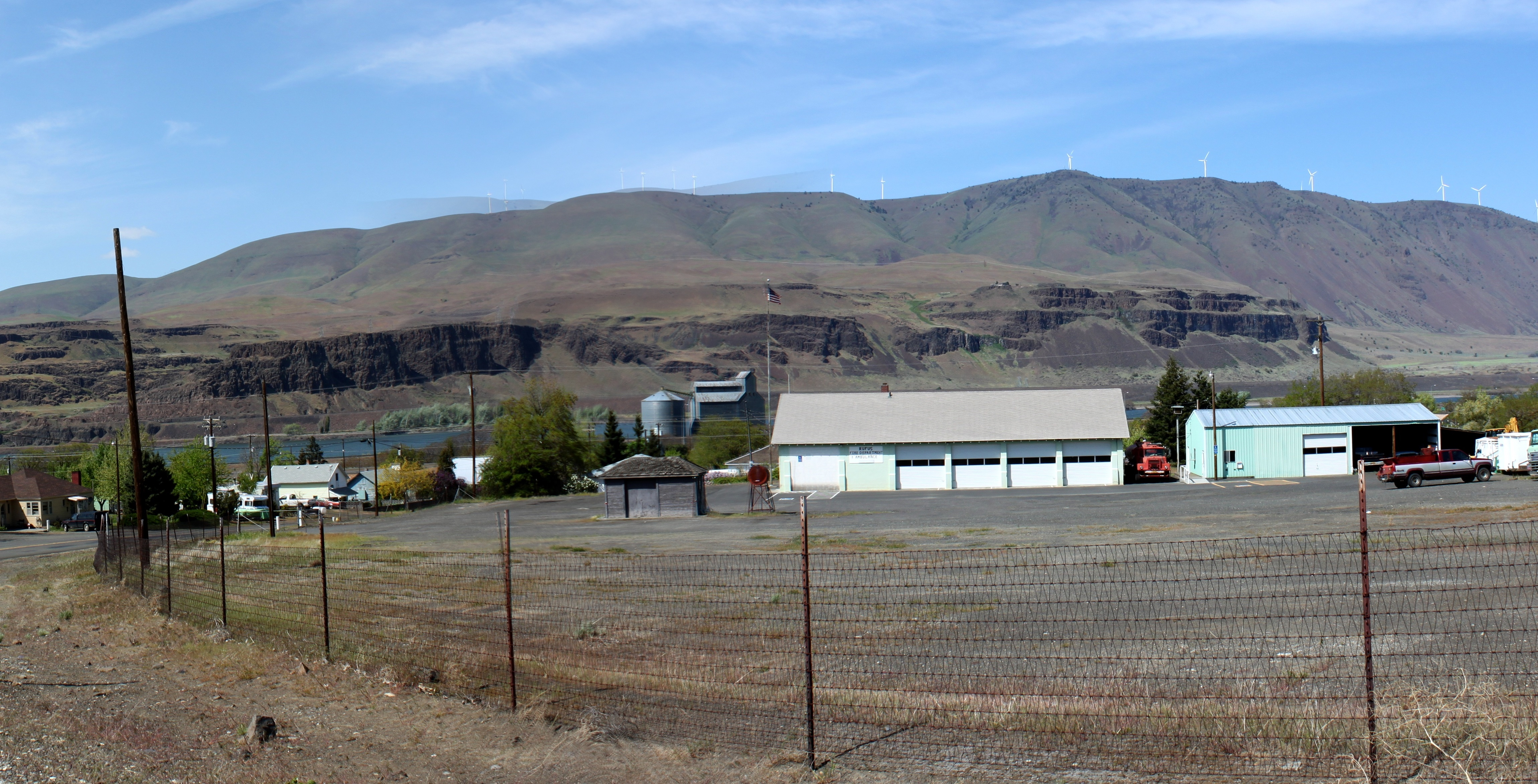
- Rufus, with the fire department in foreground

- Location in Oregon
- Coordinates: 45°41′30″N 120°44′37″W
- Country: United States
- State: Oregon
- County: Sherman
- Incorporated: 1965

Government
  - Mayor: Austin Evans

Area
  - Total: 1.34 sq mi (3.48 km^{2})
  - Land: 1.19 sq mi (3.07 km^{2})
  - Water: 0.16 sq mi (0.41 km^{2})
- Elevation: 235 ft (71.6 m)

Population (2020)
  - Total: 268
  - Density: 226.3/sq mi (87.38/km^{2})
- Time zone: UTC-8 (Pacific)
  - Summer (DST): UTC-7 (Pacific)
- ZIP code: 97050
- Area code: 541
- FIPS code: 41-64200
- GNIS feature ID: 2411013
- Website: cityofrufus.gov

Rufus is a city in Sherman County, Oregon, United States. The population was 268 at the 2020 census. The city was named for an early settler, Rufus Carrol Wallis. The city is bordered on the northern side by the Columbia River and the John Day Dam. Rufus is located in the high desert and has wildlife such as porcupines, coyotes, ground squirrels, deer, hummingbirds, ospreys, and kestrels. The city has a gas station, post office, tackle shop, market, two restaurants and two hotels. Rufus is also home to Giles French waterfront park and a no-fee boat launch on the Columbia River.

Rufus is also home to archaeological site 35SH119, where various Native American groups quarried petrified wood and other materials for stone tool creation. Although petrified wood is not as desirable as obsidian for such tools, the proximity of this site made it a location that was regularly visited over thousands of years. The quarry site is located on the west end of Rufus in what is now the Gorge Vista subdivision. The lack of human remains and datable artifacts meant that this archeological site was not recommended for inclusion in the national register of historic sites and only the original survey post marks the location of the quarry.

In November 2022, Dowen Jones, the mayor of Rufus was arrested following an alleged road-rage shooting on Highway 281 near Parkdale. According to the Hood River County Sheriff’s Office, a family of four, including two children ages five and eight, was traveling behind an SUV that was reportedly driving erratically. After the family slowed down to identify the vehicle, a man identified as Jones allegedly stepped out of the SUV and fired multiple rounds from a handgun at their car. The gunfire damaged the vehicle, but none of the four occupants were injured. Jones was arrested the following day and initially charged with one count of attempted murder and four counts of first-degree attempted assault. In 2023, Jones ultimately pleaded guilty to four counts of first-degree attempted assault as part of a plea agreement, and the attempted-murder charge was dismissed. He was sentenced to 18 months in prison.

== Geography ==
According to the United States Census Bureau, the city has a total area of 1.21 square miles (3.13 km^{2}), of which, 1.19 square miles (3.08 km^{2}) is land and 0.02 square miles (0.05 km^{2}) is water.

=== Climate ===
This region experiences warm (but not hot) and dry summers, with no average monthly temperatures above 71.6 °F. According to the Köppen Climate Classification system, Rufus has a warm-summer Mediterranean climate, abbreviated "Csb" on climate maps.

== Demographics ==
Historical population
Census	Pop.	Note	%±
1970	317		—
1980	352		11.0%
1990	295		−16.2%
2000	264		−10.5%
2010	249		−5.7%
2020	268		7.6%
U.S. Decennial Census

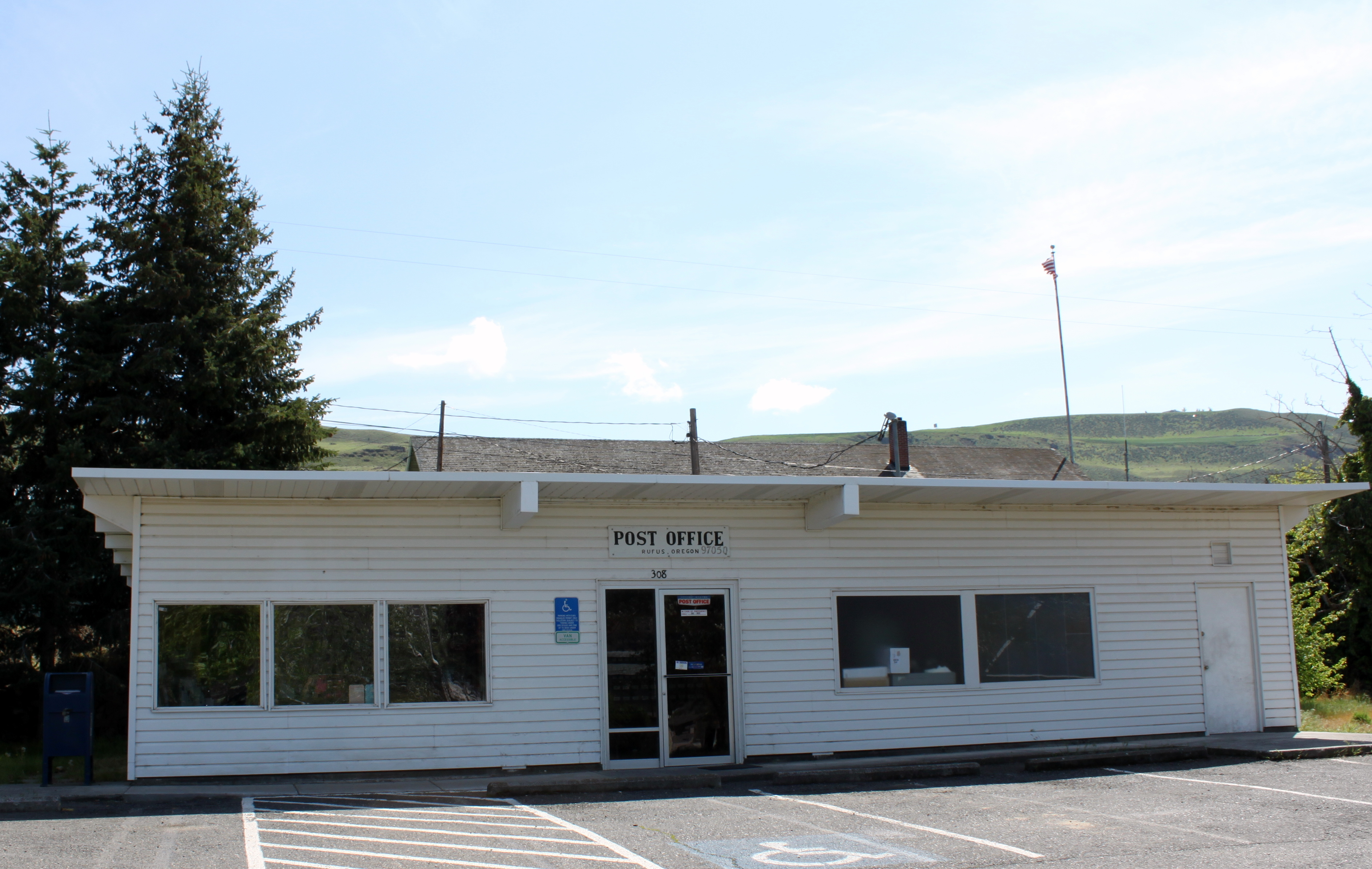
Post office in Rufus

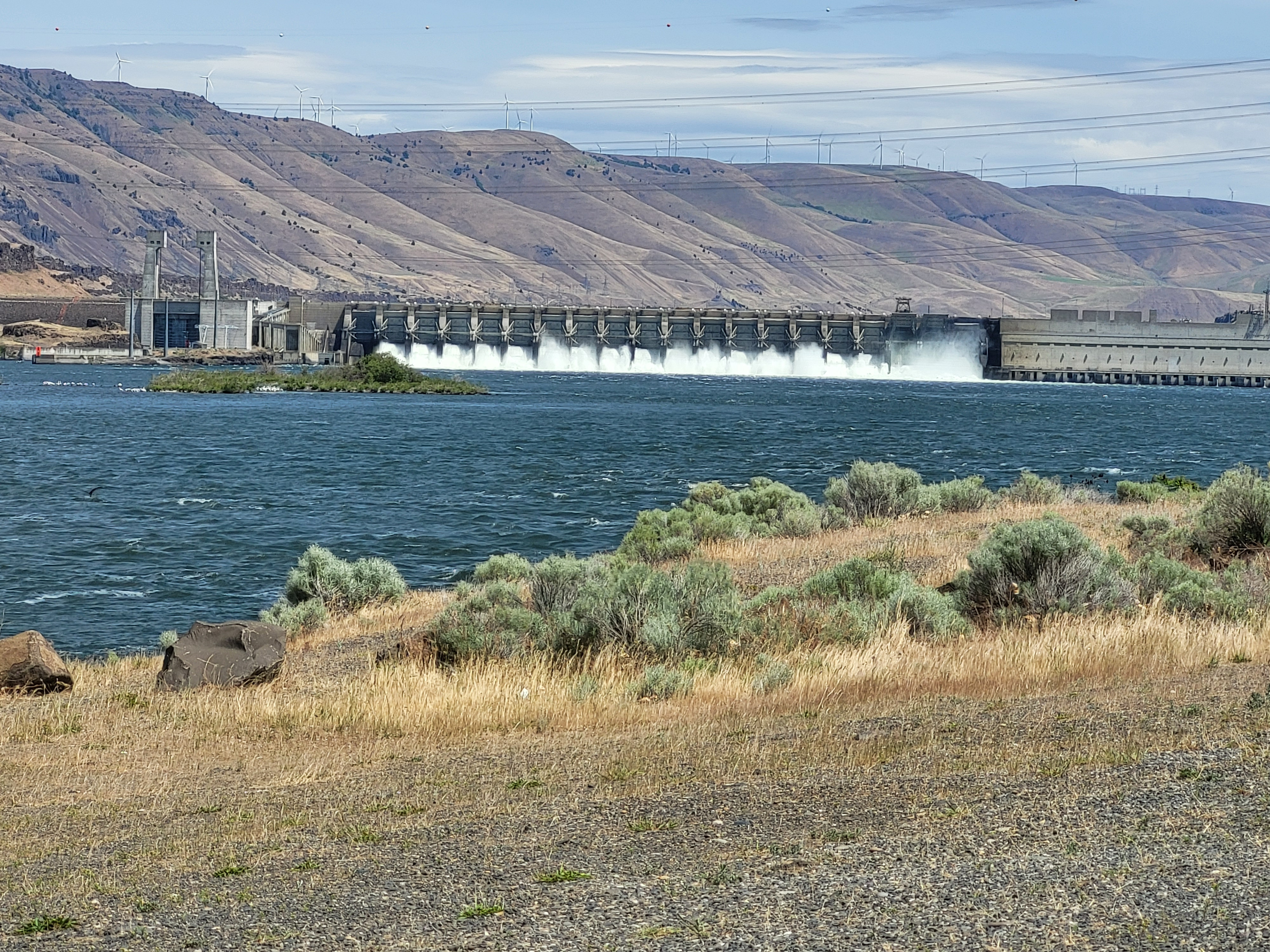
The John Day Dam is adjacent to the city on the Columbia River

=== 2020 census ===
As of the 2020 census, Rufus had a population of 268. The median age was 49.3 years. 15.7% of residents were under the age of 18 and 20.9% of residents were 65 years of age or older. For every 100 females there were 109.4 males, and for every 100 females age 18 and over there were 111.2 males age 18 and over. The census also reported that 0% of residents lived in urban areas while 100.0% lived in rural areas.

There were 130 households in Rufus, of which 23.1% had children under the age of 18 living in them. Of all households, 37.7% were married-couple households, 30.0% were households with a male householder and no spouse or partner present, and 21.5% were households with a female householder and no spouse or partner present. About 36.2% of all households were made up of individuals and 13.8% had someone living alone who was 65 years of age or older.

There were 149 housing units, of which 12.8% were vacant. Among occupied housing units, 65.4% were owner-occupied and 34.6% were renter-occupied. The homeowner vacancy rate was 1.2% and the rental vacancy rate was 19.6%.

Racial composition as of the 2020 census
Race	Number	Percent
White	225	84.0%
Black or African American	0	0%
American Indian and Alaska Native	3	1.1%
Asian	4	1.5%
Native Hawaiian and Other Pacific Islander	0	0%
Some other race	17	6.3%
Two or more races	19	7.1%
Hispanic or Latino (of any race)	45	16.8%

=== 2010 census ===
As of the census of 2010, there were 249 people, 115 households, and 65 families living in the city. The population density was 209.2 inhabitants per square mile (80.8/km^{2}). There were 141 housing units at an average density of 118.5 per square mile (45.8/km^{2}). The racial makeup of the city was 89.2% White, 5.2% Native American, 5.2% from other races, and 0.4% from two or more races. Hispanic or Latino of any race were 13.3% of the population.

There were 115 households, of which 19.1% had children under the age of 18 living with them, 46.1% were married couples living together, 4.3% had a female householder with no husband present, 6.1% had a male householder with no wife present, and 43.5% were non-families. 38.3% of all households were made up of individuals, and 17.4% had someone living alone who was 65 years of age or older. The average household size was 2.17 and the average family size was 2.89.

The median age in the city was 51.1 years. 16.9% of residents were under the age of 18; 6.3% were between the ages of 18 and 24; 16.8% were from 25 to 44; 34.8% were from 45 to 64; and 24.9% were 65 years of age or older. The gender makeup of the city was 52.6% male and 47.4% female.

=== 2000 census ===
As of the census of 2000, there were 268 people, 133 households, and 82 families living in the city. The population density was 224.3 people per square mile (86.6 people/km^{2}). There were 162 housing units at an average density of 135.6 per square mile (52.4/km^{2}). The racial makeup of the city was 91.04% White, 3.36% Native American, 0.37% Asian, 3.73% from other races, and 1.49% from two or more races. Hispanic or Latino of any race were 6.72% of the population.

There were 133 households, out of which 15.0% had children under the age of 18 living with them, 52.6% were married couples living together, 4.5% had a female householder with no husband present, and 38.3% were non-families. 35.3% of all households were made up of individuals, and 15.0% had someone living alone who was 65 years of age or older. The average household size was 2.02 and the average family size was 2.52.

In the city, the population was spread out, with 14.9% under the age of 18, 7.5% from 18 to 24, 19.8% from 25 to 44, 31.3% from 45 to 64, and 26.5% who were 65 years of age or older. The median age was 50 years. For every 100 females, there were 112.7 males. For every 100 females age 18 and over, there were 117.1 males.

The median income for a household in the city was $26,875, and the median income for a family was $29,688. Males had a median income of $28,500 versus $21,250 for females. The per capita income for the city was $16,801. About 11.5% of families and 13.5% of the population were below the poverty line, including 27.8% of those under the age of eighteen and 2.6% of those 65 or over.
