= Imbler, Oregon =

- City
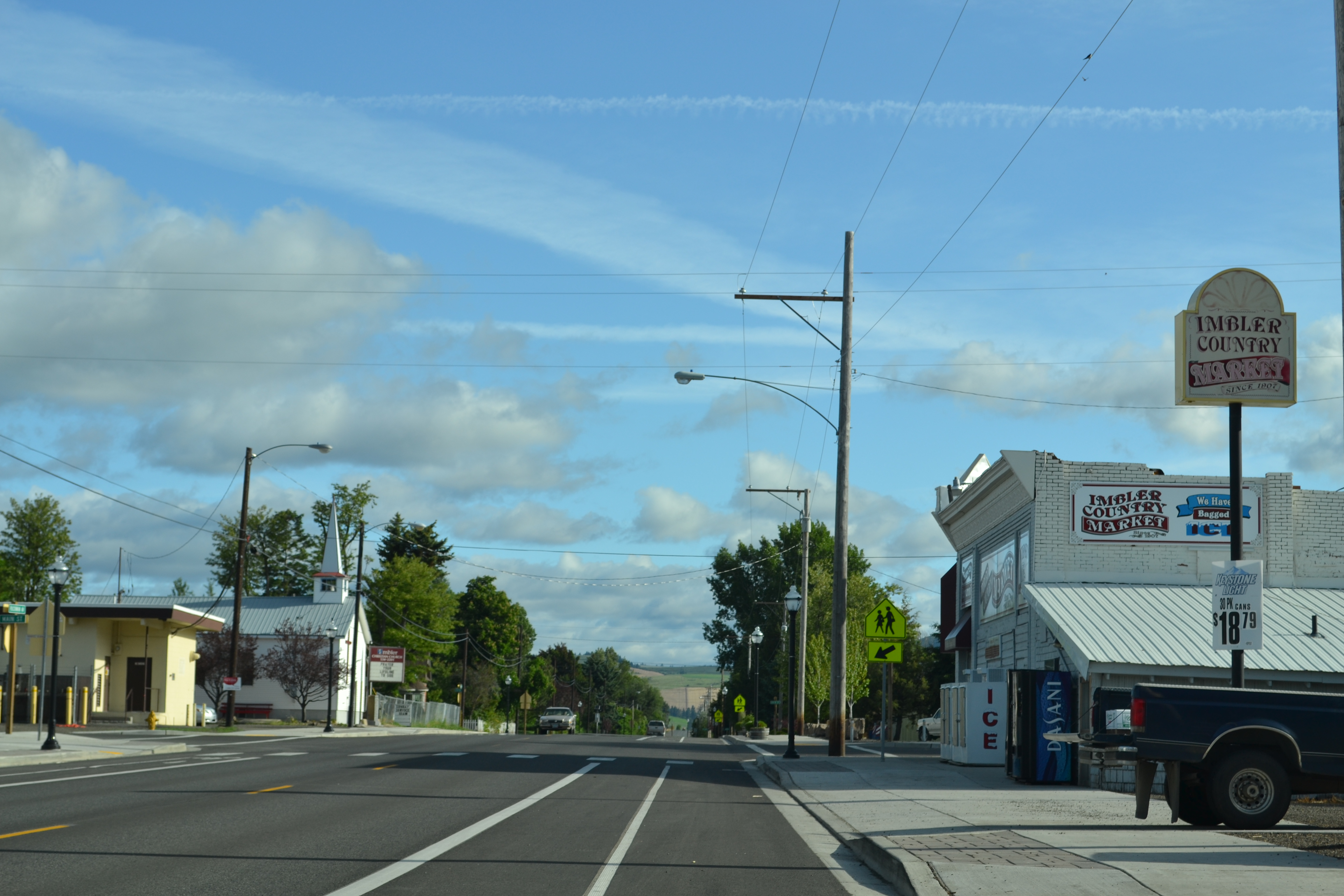

- Location in Oregon
- Coordinates: 45°27′44″N 117°57′47″W
- Country: United States
- State: Oregon
- County: Union
- Incorporated: 1922

Government
  - Mayor: Jason M.L. Berglund Sr.

Area
  - Total: 0.22 sq mi (0.56 km^{2})
  - Land: 0.22 sq mi (0.56 km^{2})
  - Water: 0 sq mi (0.00 km^{2})
- Elevation: 2,733 ft (833 m)

Population (2020)
  - Total: 245
  - Density: 1,134.1/sq mi (437.88/km^{2})
- Time zone: UTC-8 (Pacific)
  - Summer (DST): UTC-7 (Pacific)
- ZIP code: 97841
- Area code: 541
- FIPS code: 41-36050
- GNIS feature ID: 2410096
- Website: cityofimbler.org

Imbler is a city in Union County, Oregon, United States. The population was 245 at the 2020 census.

== History ==
Imbler was platted in 1891. As Summerville declined, Imbler became the town serving locals in the northern Grande Ronde Valley.

== Geography ==
Imbler lies about 4 miles (6 km) southeast of Summerville at the intersection of Summerville Road with Oregon Route 82. The state highway connects Imbler with La Grande to the southwest and Elgin to the northeast. Flowing north slightly east of the city is the Grande Ronde River.

According to the United States Census Bureau, the city has a total area of 0.22 square miles (0.57 km^{2}), all of it land.

== Demographics ==
Historical population
Census	Pop.	Note	%±
1920	206		—
1930	203		−1.5%
1940	182		−10.3%
1950	149		−18.1%
1960	137		−8.1%
1970	139		1.5%
1980	292		110.1%
1990	299		2.4%
2000	284		−5.0%
2010	306		7.7%
2020	245		−19.9%
U.S. Decennial Census

=== 2020 census ===
As of the 2020 census, Imbler had a population of 245. The median age was 50.6 years. 15.1% of residents were under the age of 18 and 26.9% of residents were 65 years of age or older. For every 100 females there were 107.6 males, and for every 100 females age 18 and over there were 105.9 males age 18 and over.

0% of residents lived in urban areas, while 100.0% lived in rural areas.

There were 105 households in Imbler, of which 26.7% had children under the age of 18 living in them. Of all households, 65.7% were married-couple households, 13.3% were households with a male householder and no spouse or partner present, and 16.2% were households with a female householder and no spouse or partner present. About 19.0% of all households were made up of individuals and 8.6% had someone living alone who was 65 years of age or older.

There were 117 housing units, of which 10.3% were vacant. Among occupied housing units, 86.7% were owner-occupied and 13.3% were renter-occupied. The homeowner vacancy rate was 2.2% and the rental vacancy rate was <0.1%.

Racial composition as of the 2020 census
Race	Number	Percent
White	206	84.1%
Black or African American	0	0%
American Indian and Alaska Native	3	1.2%
Asian	1	0.4%
Native Hawaiian and Other Pacific Islander	6	2.4%
Some other race	2	0.8%
Two or more races	27	11.0%
Hispanic or Latino (of any race)	6	2.4%

=== 2010 census ===
As of the census of 2010, there were 306 people, 114 households, and 90 families residing in the city. The population density was 1,390.9 inhabitants per square mile (537.0/km^{2}). There were 119 housing units at an average density of 540.9 per square mile (208.8/km^{2}). The racial makeup of the city was 93.8% White, 1.0% Native American, 1.3% Pacific Islander, 2.6% from other races, and 1.3% from two or more races. Hispanic or Latino of any race were 2.6% of the population.

There were 114 households, of which 36.0% had children under the age of 18 living with them, 69.3% were married couples living together, 7.0% had a female householder with no husband present, 2.6% had a male householder with no wife present, and 21.1% were non-families. 16.7% of all households were made up of individuals, and 8.7% had someone living alone who was 65 years of age or older. The average household size was 2.68 and the average family size was 3.06.

The median age in the city was 43 years. 24.5% of residents were under the age of 18; 6.8% were between the ages of 18 and 24; 24.2% were from 25 to 44; 34.3% were from 45 to 64; and 10.1% were 65 years of age or older. The gender makeup of the city was 50.3% male and 49.7% female.

=== 2000 census ===
As of the census of 2000, there were 284 people, 106 households, and 83 families residing in the city. The population density was 1,257.3 inhabitants per square mile (485.4/km^{2}). There were 111 housing units at an average density of 491.4 per square mile (189.7/km^{2}). The racial makeup of the city was 97.54% White, 0.35% Asian, 0.35% Pacific Islander, 1.41% from other races, and 0.35% from two or more races. Hispanic or Latino of any race were 1.41% of the population.

There were 106 households, out of which 47.2% had children under the age of 18 living with them, 65.1% were married couples living together, 13.2% had a female householder with no husband present, and 20.8% were non-families. 20.8% of all households were made up of individuals, and 10.4% had someone living alone who was 65 years of age or older. The average household size was 2.68 and the average family size was 3.11.

In the city, the population was spread out, with 31.3% under the age of 18, 6.7% from 18 to 24, 26.4% from 25 to 44, 25.4% from 45 to 64, and 10.2% who were 65 years of age or older. The median age was 37 years. For every 100 females, there were 98.6 males. For every 100 females age 18 and over, there were 89.3 males.

The median income for a household in the city was $40,385, and the median income for a family was $42,500. Males had a median income of $38,750 versus $25,938 for females. The per capita income for the city was $18,876. About 2.4% of families and 4.1% of the population were below the poverty line, including 2.3% of those under the age of 18 and 4.4% of those 65 or over.

== Education ==
It is within Imbler School District 11.

Union County is not in the boundary of any community college district.
