= Keating, Oregon =

Unincorporated community in the state of Oregon, United States

- Unincorporated community
- Location within Oregon Location within the United States
- Coordinates: 44°52′27″N 117°35′26″W
- Country: United States
- State: Oregon
- County: Baker
- Elevation: 2,723 ft (830 m)
- Time zone: UTC-8 (Pacific (PST))
  - Summer (DST): UTC-7 (PDT)
- Area codes: 458 and 541
- GNIS feature ID: 1122641

Keating is an unincorporated community in Baker County, in the U.S. state of Oregon. Keating lies off Keating Road north of its interchange with Oregon Route 86. Keating is northeast of Baker City.

The community was named after an early settler named "Uncle Tom" Keating, a former British sailor who had acquired land at this location. A post office operated here from 1880 to 1975.
