= Alfred H. Corbett =

American politician

Oregon State Senate
- In office 1957 – 1964
- Constituency: Multnomah County

Oregon House of Representatives
- In office 1953 – 1956
- Constituency: Multnomah County

Personal details
- Born: July 22, 1915 Portland, Oregon, US
- Died: November 10, 2000 (aged 85) Poulsbo, Washington, US
- Party: Democratic
- Spouse: Nancy Jane deCanizares Corbett
- Profession: Attorney and businessman

Alfred Hoyt Corbett (July 22, 1915 – November 10, 2000) was an American attorney, businessman, and politician in the state of Oregon. Born into one of the wealthiest and most influential families in Oregon, he attended Harvard University and then Yale Law School. He served twelve years in the Oregon Legislative Assembly, representing Multnomah County in the Oregon House of Representatives and then the Oregon State Senate.

== Early life ==
Corbett was born in Portland, Oregon on July 22, 1915, the son of Henry L. Corbett and Gretchen Hoyt Corbett. The Corbett family was one of the wealthiest and most influential families in Oregon. His father served several terms as the president of the Oregon State Senate. In addition, one of Corbett's great-grandfathers was Henry W. Corbett, a successful businessman and United States senator. Another great-grandfather, William S. Ladd, was the mayor of Portland and founder of the Ladd and Tilton Bank, the first bank established in the state of Oregon.

Corbett attended Harvard University, graduating with a business degree in 1937. He then went on to law school at Yale University. In 1939, Corbett married Nancy Jane deCanizaresin. After receiving his law degree, he returned to Oregon where he was admitted to the Oregon State Bar in 1940. He then began his law practice in Portland.

Corbett served in the United States Army during World War II, entering military service in January 1943. During the war, he rose to the rank of sergeant, serving in a mountain infantry unit in Italy for 20 months. He was discharged from the army and returned to Oregon in September 1945.

== Attorney ==
Back in Portland, Corbett worked as an attorney for the law firm of Koerner, Young, Swett and McCulloch. The mayor of Portland, Dorothy McCullough Lee, appointed him to the Portland Housing Authority in 1949. During the late 1940s and early 1950s, he also served on the board of governors for the City Club of Portland and was a member of the Portland Art Association board. He was also a member of the American Legion, Veterans of Foreign Wars, and Fraternal Order of Eagles.

In 1951, Corbett was appointed as the assistant general counsel for the Defense Electric Power Administration in Washington, District of Columbia. The agency was part of the Department of Interior and was responsible for preparing the electric power industry for civil defense emergencies. While working at the agency, Corbett was approved to practice law before the United States Supreme Court. He left the Federal government position and returned to Oregon in 1952.

== Political career ==
Corbett's family had been leaders in Oregon's Republican Party for three generations. His father and two great-grandfathers were elected to public office as Republicans. However, Corbett became a Democrat in 1949, initially serving as a Democratic committeeman in Multnomah County.

In 1952, Corbett ran for Oregon's District 3 seat in the United States House of Representatives. He won the Democratic primary. In the general election, his opponent was Homer D. Angell, the incumbent Republican. During the campaign, Corbett accused Angell of being an isolationist because of several Congressional votes Angell made prior to the outbreak of World War II. The accusation made Angell so angry that he walked out of a public debate with Corbett. In the end, Corbett lost the election.

A few months after the 1952 election, a state representative from Multnomah County died unexpectedly. Corbett was appointed to fill the vacant seat in Oregon's State House of Representatives, serving in the 1953 regular session. In 1954, his Multnomah County constituents elected him for a second term, allowing him to serve in the 1955 regular session.

In 1956, Corbett ran for a seat in the state senate. He won the Democratic primary in May and then the general election in November. During his four-year term, Corbett served in the 1957 regular session and a special session later that year as well as the 1959 regular session. As a senator, Corbett served as co-chairman of the legislature's powerful Joint Ways and Means Committee.

Corbett was re-elected to the state senate in 1960. After the election, Democrats outnumbered Republicans in the state senate 20 to 10. The Democratic caucus selected Corbett as their party leader and candidate for President of the Senate. However, when the senate gathered to elect its officers in January 1961, senate Republicans joined conservative Democrats to elect a more conservative Democrat, Harry D. Boivin, as President of the Senate. Corbett's second term in the state senate included the 1961 regular legislative session, the 1963 regular session, and then a special session late in 1963.

During his twelve years in the Oregon legislature, Corbett was an important leader. He served as chairman of the Ways and Means Committee twice, chairman of the Legislative Fiscal Committee, and chairman of the Labor and Industries Committee along with various other committee appointments.

Corbett left the senate in 1964 to run for Secretary of State, Oregon's second-highest elective office. While he won the Democratic primary, he lost the general election to Tom McCall, a popular Republican who later became governor of Oregon. In the general election, Corbett received 253,792 votes (43.5 percent of the total votes cast) while McCall got 329,813 votes.

== Later life ==
After losing the Secretary of State election, Corbett was considered for re-appointment to the Oregon State Senate when an incumbent Democratic senator, Walter J. Pearson, became seriously ill. However, Corbett had just accepted an appointed position in President Lyndon Johnson's administration. A few months after the 1964 election, President Johnson had appointed Corbett to a senior position in the legal office of the United States Office of Economic Opportunity in Washington, D.C. In this position, Corbett played a leading role in the Johnson administration's War on Poverty.

When the Legal Services Corporation was created in 1974 by the Federal government to provide legal assistance to low-income people, Corbett joined the organization. He served as chairman of the corporation's Project Review Board, the group that reviewed funding applications for legal aid programs. Corbett worked to preserve legal services for the poor when the Nixon administration tried to disband the corporation.

Corbett retired in 1978. After retiring, he moved to a cattle ranch near Tumalo in Central Oregon. Eventually, he and his wife moved to Camp Sherman, Oregon, where they lived through most of the 1990s. Corbett died on November 10, 2000, in Poulsbo, Washington. He is buried at the River View Cemetery in Portland.

== Legacy ==
Corbett's papers on his work at the Office of Economic Opportunity and the Legal Services Corporation are preserved in the National Equal Justice Library archives at Georgetown University in Washington, D.C. The collection contains a wide range of documents including program budgets, management reports, official letters, memorandums, handwritten notes, and newspaper clippings. There are also several albums filled with photographs taken by Corbett that record agency activities.
