= Neotsu, Oregon =

Unincorporated community in the state of Oregon, United States

- Unincorporated community
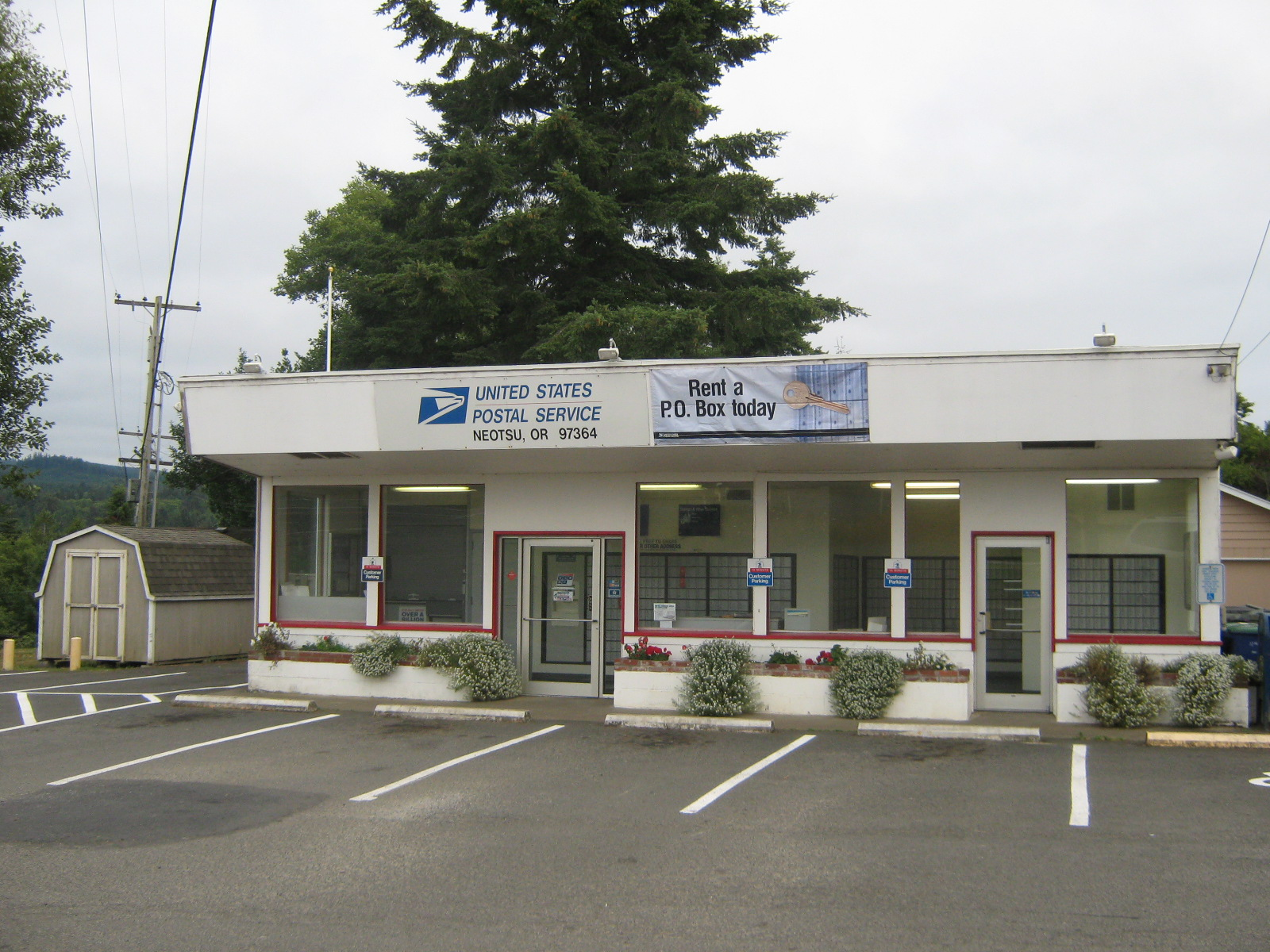
- Post office in Neotsu

- Location within Oregon Location within the United States
- Coordinates: 45°00′03″N 123°58′43″W
- Country: United States
- State: Oregon
- County: Lincoln

Area
  - Total: 1.41 sq mi (3.66 km^{2})
  - Land: 1.07 sq mi (2.77 km^{2})
  - Water: 0.34 sq mi (0.89 km^{2})
- Elevation: 98 ft (30 m)

Population (2020)
  - Total: 608
  - Density: 569.3/sq mi (219.79/km^{2})
- Time zone: UTC-8 (Pacific (PST))
  - Summer (DST): UTC-7 (PDT)
- ZIP code: 97364
- Area code: 541
- GNIS feature ID: 2812891

Neotsu is an unincorporated community in Lincoln County, Oregon, United States, on the northern shore of Devils Lake across from Lincoln City. Neotsu has a post office with ZIP code 97364. The community is on the 45th parallel north.

State representative David Gomberg is from Neotsu.

== Demographics ==
Historical population
Census	Pop.	Note	%±
2020	608		—
U.S. Decennial Census

== Education ==
There is one school district in the county, the Lincoln County School District.

The county is in the Oregon Coast Community College district.
