= Harry D. Boivin =

American politician

Harry Boivin

43rd President of the Oregon State Senate
- In office 1961–1963; 1965–1967
- Preceded by: Walter J. Pearson; Ben Musa
- Succeeded by: Ben Musa; Eugene "Debbs" Potts
- Constituency: Klamath County

Member of the Oregon Senate from the 15th/18th district
- In office 1955–1972
- Preceded by: Philip S. Hitchcock
- Succeeded by: Fred W. Heard
- Constituency: Crook, Deschutes, Jefferson, Klamath; and Lake counties in 1955-1956; Klamath County only after 1957

38th Speaker of the Oregon House of Representatives
- In office 1937–1939
- Preceded by: Howard Latourette
- Succeeded by: Ernest R. Fatland
- Constituency: Klamath County

Member of the Oregon House of Representatives from the 32nd district
- In office 1935–1942
- Preceded by: Ralph W. Horan
- Succeeded by: Louis H. Caver

Personal details
- Born: February 7, 1904 Ashland, Oregon
- Died: March 15, 1999 (aged 95) Medford, Oregon
- Party: Democratic
- Spouse(s): Vivian McCauley Boivin and Ruth S. Padgett
- Profession: Lawyer

Harry Dolan Boivin (February 7, 1904 – March 15, 1999) was an American lawyer and politician. He was a member of the Oregon House of Representatives for four terms, from 1935 through 1942. He also served in the Oregon State Senate from 1955 to 1972. He held the position of Speaker of the House during the 1937 legislative session, and was President of the Oregon Senate during the 1961 and 1965 sessions. Boivin was known as "The Fox" for his expertise in parliamentary procedures and ability to build coalitions within legislature. For almost a decade in the 1960s and early 1970s, Boivin and a small group of rural conservative Democrats joined Republicans to control the state senate.

== Early life ==
Boivin was born in Ashland, Oregon on February 7, 1904, the son of Henry and Nellie Boivin. The family moved to Klamath Falls, Oregon in 1906. He received a bachelor's degree from Santa Clara University; then went on to earn a law degree from the university.

In 1923, Boivin became an associate in a Klamath Falls law firm headed by Claude McColloch. When McColloch was appointed to the United States District Court in the 1930s, Boivin continued in a one-man law practice.

In 1934, Boivin married Vivian McCauley. Together they had two children.

== Political career ==
Boivin, a Democrat, was elected to the Oregon House of Representatives in 1935, representing Klamath County. He was re-elected in 1937. At that time, he was only 33 years old. When his peers in the House of Representatives elected him speaker, he became the youngest speaker in Oregon history. He went on to serve two more terms as a state representative, holding his seat through 1942.

During World War II, Boivin worked in the United States Attorney's office in Portland, Oregon. After the war, he resumed his private law practice in Klamath Falls. He spearheaded the drive to establish the Oregon Institute of Technology in Klamath Falls, which opened in 1947.

In 1955, Boivin was elected to the Oregon State Senate. He served in the senate for the next 18 years, completing his last term in 1972. During his tenure in the senate, Boivin's colleagues elected him Senate president twice, in 1961 and 1965.

In 1957, the Oregon state senate was evenly divided between Republicans and Democrats, with 15 senators from each party. As a result, the chamber was unable to elect a president for 11 days. For 288 ballots, the 15 Democratic senators voted for their leader, Walter J. Pearson. The Republicans also voted as a block, alternating their 15 votes between their leader, Warren C. Gill, and three conservative Democrats the Republicans were willing to accept as president. Boivin was one of the three Democrats that Republicans favored, but he voted with his party colleagues. However, on the 289th ballot, Boivin broke ranks with his fellow Democrats and voted for Boyd R. Overhulse instead of Pearson. The entire senate, Republicans and Democrats, followed Boivin's lead. As a result, Overhulse was unanimously elected President of the Senate, becoming the first Democrat to hold that position in 79 years. Overhulse was a moderate Democrat from eastern Oregon, but no one had considered him for president because he had just been elected and had only served 11 days in the senate.

For almost a decade in the 1960s and early 1970s, Boivin and a small group of conservative Democrats joined the Republican minority to control the senate. During this period, various conservative Democrats were elected president of the senate with the help of Republican senators. The senate president then appointed other members of the conservative Democratic clique to chair key committees with the rest of the committee chairmanships going to Republicans. This arrangement gave Boivin great influence within the senate.

In 1964, he helped move the Oregon Institute of Technology to a new campus overlooking Upper Klamath Lake. He also persuaded Republican governor Tom McCall to move the headquarters of the Oregon Air National Guard from Portland to Klamath Falls. When the United States Air Force considered closing Kingsley Field, Boivin joined forces with McCall and Oregon's representatives in the United States Congress to keep the base open.

In 1971, Boivin played a key role in the ratification of the 26th Amendment to the United States Constitution, which lowered the national voting age to 18. This occurred during a period when Governor McCall was out of the state and the president of the senate, John D. Burns, was acting governor. As president pro tempore of the senate, Boivin presided over the senate when Burns was acting governor. Boivin and Burns were both conservative Democrats who allied themselves with the Republican minority to control the senate. However, in the case of the 26th Amendment, Burns had been holding the ratification bill in committee while Boivin wanted it brought before the full senate for a vote. When Burns became acting governor, Boivin took advantage of his position as presiding officer in the senate to appoint two new members to the committee considering the amendment. Both of the new members favored the amendment, and with their help the resolution was reported out of committee. When Burns returned to the senate, he refused to allow a vote on the bill. This prompted 14 Democratic senators to walk out of the assembly, leaving the body without a quorum. Burns directed the Oregon State Police to find the missing senators and bring them back to the capitol. Over the course of the next three days, telephone negotiations resulted in a deal to allow the senate to vote on the amendment. Oregon ratified the 26th Amendment on July 1, 1971, thanks in large part to Boivin's committee stacking maneuver.

It was such parliamentary maneuvers that earned Boivin the nickname The Fox. After his retirement from the legislature, The Oregon Journal said: "Harry Boivin was a master of the art of wheeling and dealing." The article also noted that Boivin took pride in his nickname because it underscored his ability to get things done.

== Later life ==
After leaving the state Senate in 1972, Boivin continued to practice law in Klamath Falls. Over the years, he held a number of other positions including chairman of the Oregon Liquor Control Commission. He was also a member of the Klamath County Chamber of Commerce board of directors, and a member of the Oregon State Board of Higher Education and served on the Governor's Commission on Senior Services.

Boivin was honored by the Klamath County Chamber of Commerce in 1980 for his contributions to the local business community. In 1992, he received an honorary doctorate of technology degree from the Oregon Institute of Technology. The college also honored him with a special service award in 1995.

His wife, Vivian, died in 1985. In 1986, he married Ruth S. Padgett. Boivin died on 15 March 1999 in Medford, Oregon, at the age of 95. He was interred at the Klamath Memorial Park in Klamath Falls.

== Legacy ==
After his death in 1999, the 70th Oregon Legislative Assembly passed a concurrent resolution honoring Boivin for his 26 years of service as a citizen legislator. The resolution recognized his many legislative accomplishments and highlighted his ability to build coalitions across political and ideological boundaries for the benefit of the state of Oregon and its people.

Throughout his life, Boivin was a great supporter of education. As a state legislator, he was the driving force behind the establishment of the Oregon Institute of Technology in Klamath Falls. He established a $1.25 million trust fund for the college in 1995. In 2000, one of the academic buildings at the Oregon Institute of Technology was renamed in his honor.

Today, Boivin's personal papers are archived in the Shaw Historical Library at the Oregon Institute of Technology in Klamath Falls, Oregon. The collection includes legislature booklets, newspaper clippings, scrapbooks, and family papers covering the period 1935 to 1971.
