= Monroe Sweetland =

American politician

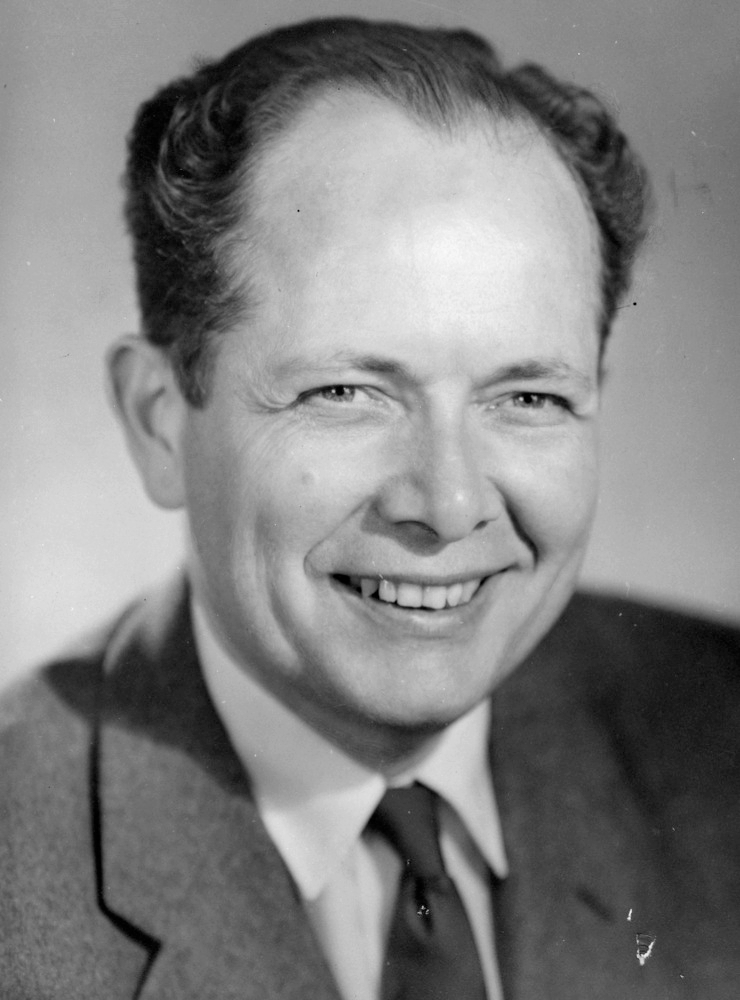
- Sweetland c. 1956

Member of the Oregon Senate from the 11th district
- In office January 10, 1955 – January 14, 1963

Member of the Oregon House of Representatives from the 7th district
- In office January 12, 1953 – January 10, 1955

Personal details
- Born: January 20, 1910 Salem, Oregon, U.S.
- Died: September 10, 2006 (aged 96) Milwaukie, Oregon, U.S.
- Party: Socialist (before 1935); Democratic (after 1935)
- Spouse: Lillie Megrath (m. 1933)
- Children: Barbara; Rebecca
- Education: Wittenberg College; Syracuse University; Cornell University

Monroe Mark Sweetland (January 20, 1910 – September 10, 2006) was an American politician in the state of Oregon. A native of the state, he served in both houses of the Oregon Legislative Assembly starting in 1953 for a total of ten years. A Democrat, he also twice ran and lost bids to serve as the Oregon Secretary of State and was a Democratic National Committeeman. Sweetland later served on the staff of the National Education Association, supporting passage of the Bilingual Education Act of 1968.

== Early life ==
Monroe Sweetland was born on January 20, 1910, in Salem, Oregon. His father, Dr. G. J. Sweetland, was a doctor who also served as athletic director at Willamette University. When Sweetland was two, the family moved to Michigan where he remained until entering college at age 16. At age 11, in 1922, he and a friend organized a city caucus to elect Democratic candidates after learning that none had been nominated. Sweetland graduated from Wittenberg College in Springfield, Ohio, with a Bachelor of Arts degree in 1930. He then entered law school at Syracuse University and later Cornell University. In 1933, he married Lil Megrath, whom he met in Syracuse. They had two daughters, Barbara and Rebecca.

== Political career ==
In the early 1930s, Sweetland was as an activist in the Socialist Party and a field organizer for the Student League for Industrial Democracy. He supported Norman Thomas, Socialist for president and SLID activist, in his 1932 campaign. In 1935, Sweetland and his family returned to Oregon to work as the executive director of the Oregon Commonwealth Federation (OCF), a liberal organization whose goals included public power, increased membership in labor unions, civil rights, and social security. Sweetland at that time left the Socialist Party to become a Democrat. The OCF helped engineer the defeat of conservative Democratic Governor Charles Martin in 1938. The winner of the primary, Henry Hess, was defeated in the general election, but the primary victory emboldened Sweetland and other liberals, who saw moderate Republican Governor Charles Sprague as an improvement over Martin.

Sweetland held federal and labor-relations appointments between 1940 and 1943 and then joined the American Red Cross, serving in the Pacific theater of operations for two years. It was during this time that he became acquainted with fellow Oregon Democrat Howard Morgan, who would, upon war's end, help Sweetland organize Democratic victories in Oregon.

In 1948 Sweetland was elected as a Harry Truman delegate, as well as Oregon Democratic National Committeeman, thereby successfully wresting control of the Democratic Party from a reactionary "Dixiecrat" element and becoming the highest ranking Democratic official in the state. This position made him the figure consulted by President Truman regarding federal appointments in Oregon. During the ensuing eight years, under Sweetland's leadership, the modern progressive Oregon Democratic Party emerged, with victories in the governorship, both houses of Congress, and in the Oregon State Legislature. One of the primary goals of the Oregon Democratic Party during those years was the creation of the Columbia Valley Authority (CVA), a national public power entity modeled on the Tennessee Valley Authority. Although many in the Pacific Northwest favored the creation of the CVA, conservative Democrats like former Oregon Governor Oswald West and most Republicans opposed and defeated the idea of the creation of the CVA. West, viewed as a progressive governor from 1911 to 1914, later worked as a lobbyist for a large utility, and became a public critic of Sweetland, erroneously accusing him and other liberal Democrats such as federal judge and former Oregon Commonwealth Federation member Gus J. Solomon of having Communist affiliations.

Elected to the Oregon House of Representatives in 1952 to represent District 7 from Milwaukie, Sweetland was the first Democrat in two decades to win a seat from Clackamas County in the lower chamber house. He won election to the Oregon State Senate in 1954 and re-election in 1958 to a second four-year term, spending a total of ten years in the legislature. Sweetland wanted to run for U.S. Congress in Oregon's 3rd Congressional district in 1954, but was dissuaded by some Democratic peers, including Howard Morgan and State Senator Richard Neuberger, who feared that, especially during the time of "McCarthyism", Sweetland's past Socialist ties would result in his defeat and that of other Democrats just as the party was beginning its rise. Sweetland decided to not run, and, in the fall, Democrat Edith Green won election in the 3rd Congressional District, while Neuberger won a close race for U.S. Senate, becoming the first Democrat elected to that position from Oregon in four decades.

Sweetland ran for secretary of state in 1956, losing narrowly to fellow State Senator Mark Hatfield. However, the years of organizing by Sweetland, Morgan and others, combined with public support for public power, resulted in a Democratic sweep in Oregon. Senator Wayne Morse, a Republican turned Independent, was courted by Morgan and pushed more aggressively by Sweetland to join the Democratic party, and Morse registered as a Democrat in 1955. Morse easily defeated former Oregon Republican governor and Eisenhower Interior Secretary Douglas McKay in the 1956 election. Robert Holmes won a special election for governor. Edith Green was re-elected in the 3rd Congressional District, while Charles O. Porter won in the 4th Congressional District and Al Ullman, a strong CVA advocate, won in the 2nd Congressional District and would serve 24 years in Congress. The Democrats, who had been such a minority in the Oregon Legislature that people joked the party could caucus in a phone booth, won majorities in both the Oregon House and Senate for the first time since 1878.

In 1960, Sweetland again ran for secretary of state and lost, this time to Howell Appling, who had been appointed by Hatfield as his successor upon Hatfield's election as governor in 1958. During his years as a part-time Oregon legislator, Sweetland was a newspaper publisher in Milwaukie (his home), while also owning papers in Newport, and Molalla. While in the legislature he worked to turn what was then Portland State College into a full university to better serve Portland, for which he was honored with the President's Award from the school in 1995. Sweetland also worked to lower the voting age to 18 from 21. Additionally, he sponsored legislation to provide scholarships for Oregonians to attend state universities. His last session in the legislature was representing then District 11 in the Oregon Senate during the 1961 session.

As a prominent Democrat in one of the few states to hold presidential primaries at that time, Sweetland was contacted by candidates such as Adlai Stevenson, W. Averell Harriman, Estes Kefauver and their staffs. Despite his great admiration for the more liberal Senator Hubert Humphrey, Sweetland chose to support Senator John F. Kennedy for the 1960 Democratic Presidential nomination. Sweetland appeared with Kennedy on many of his visits to Oregon in 1959/60, was a paid Kennedy campaign organizer, and was elected as a delegate on the 1960 Democratic primary ballot. Oregon's support for Kennedy over Morse (Humphrey had dropped out of the race by then) made Sweetland and the others automatic Kennedy delegates per the state's winner-take-all rules at the time. Kennedy won the nomination, but upset Sweetland and other liberals by picking the runner-up, Senator Lyndon Johnson, as his running mate.

In 1963, Sweetland taught journalism at a college in Indonesia, a country that had fascinated him since meeting Indonesians during World War II.

== Later life ==
He and his family moved to San Mateo, California in 1965, where Sweetland served as the National Education Association (NEA) lobbyist for the 13 Western states until his mandatory retirement in 1975. In that role he advocated the use of federal money to provide support to schools to encourage them to teach English as a second language. This led to the Bilingual Education Act of 1968, which Sweetland considered his most important contribution. He was also instrumental in the passage of the 18 year old vote.

After his mandatory retirement from NEA at age 65, Sweetland continued his lifelong interest in flora by establishing Western Wilderness Products. He harvested and sold unusual plants and pine cones to wholesale florists until 1994. Sweetland's wife, Lil, died in 1985, after 52 years of marriage.

When Sweetland returned to Oregon in 1994, legally blind, he spent his final years as an elder statesman and mentor to many young Democrats, including future Governor Kate Brown. Sweetland, at age 88, unsuccessfully ran for his old state senate seat (District 12) in 1998, losing to his friend, moderate Republican Verne Duncan.

From 1994 until his death in 2006, Sweetland was quite active in organizations such as the Democratic Party of Oregon, The City Club of Portland, and the Wayne Morse Historical Society in Eugene. He often took a City Metro bus from near his home in Milwaukie to downtown Portland, navigating the street traffic by himself, with his white cane. His business cards at the time read: "Nothing just happens, everything is brought about" and "My eyesight is dim, but my vision is clear." Toward the end of his life, a scholarship was established in Sweetland's name at Portland State University, funded by his friends, most prominently KING (NBC) Broadcasting executive Ancil Payne of Seattle.

Monroe Mark Sweetland died on September 10, 2006, at the age of 96 in Milwaukie, OR, survived by his daughters Barbara Sweetland Smith and Rebecca Sweetland, and three granddaughters (Lauren Smith, Allison Blandini and Kate Roberson). Verne Duncan delivered one of several eulogies for Sweetland, at his Portland State University memorial service, as did Governor Ted Kulongoski and others. Sweetland is buried with his maternal grandparents at the Idlewilde Cemetery in Hood River, Oregon.

Since Sweetland's death in 2006, two books have been written about him: "Me and the Senator Search for Captain Jack's Severed Head, My Life on the Road with Monroe Sweetland" by Michael Tassone (2024) and A Man for All Seasons by William G. Robbins (2015).
