= Leon S. Davis =

American politician and real estate agent

- Davis in 1954

Member of the Oregon House of Representatives from the 4th district
- In office 1953–1963
- Preceded by: J. O. Johnson
- Succeeded by: Victor Atiyeh

Personal details
- Born: August 29, 1895
- Died: May 3, 1968 (aged 72)
- Resting place: Fir Lawn Cemetery
- Party: Republican
- Occupation: real estate agent

Leon Stafford Davis (August 29, 1895 – May 3, 1968) was a politician and real estate agent in the U.S. state of Oregon. A Republican, he served in the Oregon Legislative Assembly representing Hillsboro.

== Early life ==
Davis grew up on a farm near the city of Beaverton, Oregon, and went to school in that community. During World War I he served in combat, before returning to Washington County, where he worked for the Hillsboro Argus.

== Political career ==
During the Great Depression, he served as an administrator with Oregon's State Emergency Relief Agency (SERA). Davis served as manager of the Washington County Fair in 1950, and was then elected as the president of the Oregon Fairs Association in 1952.

He was then elected to the Oregon House of Representatives in 1952, taking office on January 12, 1953, replacing J. O. Johnson in District 4. He won reelections, and served in the House through the 1961 session. District 4 then went to future governor Victor Atiyeh. After leaving the legislature, Davis ran for Washington County Commissioner in 1964, losing in the November election to Joe Van Dyke. At the time, he owned a real estate firm, and had been elected as president of the Oregon Association of Realtors. Davis died in 1968, with the Oregon Legislature paying tribute the next session in 1969.
