= Boyd R. Overhulse =

American politician

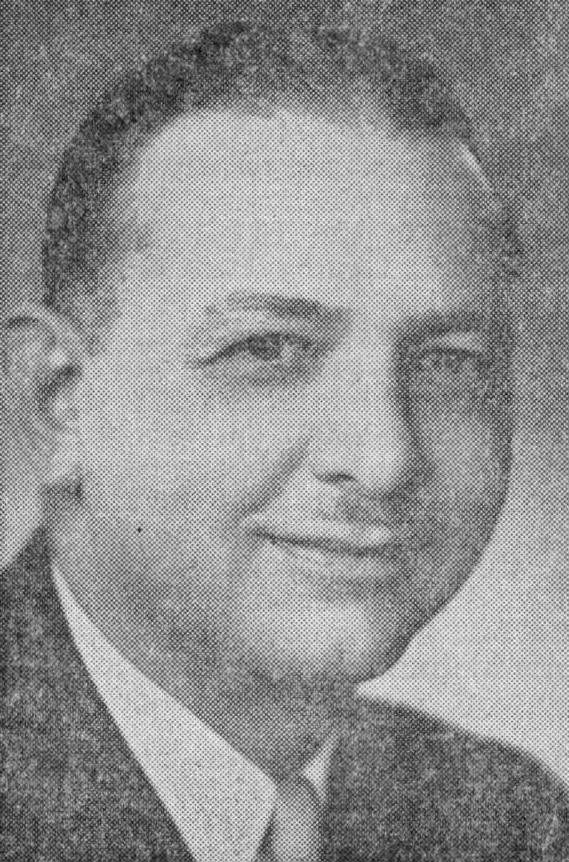

41st President of the Oregon State Senate
- In office 1957–1958
- Preceded by: Elmo Smith
- Succeeded by: Walter J. Pearson

Member of the Oregon Senate from the 17th and 19th district
- In office 1957–1964
- Preceded by: Harry D. Boivin
- Succeeded by: Gordon W. McKay
- Constituency: Crook, Deschutes, Jefferson, and Lake counties

Member of the Oregon House of Representatives from the 26th and 25th district
- In office 1951–1956
- Preceded by: William B. Morse
- Succeeded by: Ben Evick

Personal details
- Born: July 30, 1909 Warner, South Dakota
- Died: January 2, 1966 (aged 56) Culver, Oregon
- Party: Democratic
- Profession: Attorney

Boyd Richey Overhulse (July 30, 1909 – January 2, 1966) was an American politician and attorney from Oregon. He served three terms in the Oregon House of Representatives followed by two terms in the Oregon State Senate. A conservative Democrat from a rural district, Overhulse was known for his ability to work with Republicans as well as fellow Democrats in the state legislature. He was elected President of the Oregon Senate eleven days after taking his seat in the state senate, the first Democrat elected to that position in 79 years.

== Early life ==
Overhulse was born on July 30, 1909, in Warner, South Dakota. His parents, K. C. and Edith Overhulse, were both teachers. The Overhulse family moved to Jefferson County, Oregon, when Boyd was young. The family later moved to Weston in northeast Oregon, where Overhulse graduated from high school.

Overhulse graduated from University of Oregon School of Law in 1933. He worked briefly as a bookkeeper for the Oregon Journal newspaper before passing his bar examination. Later that year, he married Helena Graham.

In 1934, Overhulse returned to Jefferson County and was elected district attorney. He was re-elected to that position three times. In 1948, he resigned in order to concentrate on his private law practice. After leaving the district attorney position, he became president of Jefferson County Title and Abstract Company and bought a farm near Madras. He returned to public service in 1949, serving as the Madras city attorney. During this period, Overhulse was active in the Madras Odd Fellows lodge, the local Lions Club, the Prineville Elks chapter, and the Chamber of Commerce. He was also president of the Oregon Bar Association.

== State representative ==
Overhulse, a Democrat, was elected to the Oregon House of Representatives in 1950, winning the general election by only 18 votes. He represented District 26 which included Crook and Jefferson counties. The 1951 legislative session ran from January 8 through May 3. During the session, he served on three committees: agriculture, alcohol control, and revision of laws.

In 1952, Overhulse was unopposed in the Democratic primary and then easily won the general election. The 1953 legislative session only ran from January 12 through April 21. During the session, he was appointed to the agriculture, education, and revision of laws committees. However, Overhulse fell seriously ill with rheumatic fever in March and missed the latter half of the session. He was so sick that he was taken home to Madras by ambulance. He finally returned to work at his law practice in July.

In 1954, Overhulse decided to run for a third term. He faced two opponents in the Democratic primary and easily defeated both. In the primary, he also won the Republican nomination with write-in votes. As a result, he was unopposed in the general election. While he still represented Crook and Jefferson counties, redistricting changed his legislative district to District 25. The 1955 legislative session ran from January 10 through May 4. During the session, Overhulse served on a special committee that studied and made recommendations to update Oregon election laws.

== Senate President ==
In 1956, Overhulse decided to run for a new state senate seat created by Oregon voters in 1954. The new district, District 17, included Crook, Deschutes, Jefferson, and Lake counties. He was unopposed in the Democratic primary, but faced a Republican and an independent in the general election. Overhulse won the general election with 7,770 votes. His Republican opponent received 5,593 votes while the independent candidate got 4,665 votes. Overhulse took his seat in the Oregon State Senate on January 14, 1957.

The 1957 legislative session was very unusual. The 1956 election produced a state senate that was evenly divided between Republicans and Democrats, with 15 senators from each party. As a result, the chamber was unable to elect a president for 11 days. For 288 ballots, the 15 Democratic senators voted for their leader, Walter J. Pearson. The Republicans also voted as a block, alternating their 15 votes between their leader, Warren C. Gill, and three conservative Democrats the Republicans were willing to accept as president. On the 289th ballot, Harry D. Boivin broke ranks with his fellow Democrats and voted for Overhulse instead of Pearson. The entire senate, Republicans and Democrats, followed Boivin's lead. As a result, Overhulse was unanimously elected President of the Senate, becoming the first Democrat to hold that position in 79 years.

As President of the Senate, Overhulse appointed 10 Democrats and 10 Republicans to committee chairmanships and split committee memberships equally between the two parties as well. As a conservative rural legislator, Overhulse sometimes voted with the Republicans, but also stood with fellow Democrats on many issues. His bi-partisan leadership approach was very effective and made him popular with all his colleagues in the legislature. When friends in Central Oregon decided to honor Overhulse at a tribute dinner in Madras, over 300 civic and political leaders from around the state attended. The master of ceremonies at the event was Tom McCall, a future Republican governor of Oregon. The Republican leader in the senate, Warren Gill, attended as did Walter Pearson, the senate's Democratic leader. The speaker of the Oregon House of Representatives also attended along with numerous other legislators, who rented a bus for the trip from Salem to Madras and back. In addition, Governor Robert D. Holmes, United States Senator Wayne Morse, Oregon congressman Al Ullman, and Portland mayor Terry Schrunk all sent personal telegrams which McCall read to the guests at the dinner. At the event, Overhulse was presented with a peace pipe by an elder of the Confederated Tribes of Warm Springs, recognizing him for "keeping the peace" in Oregon's state government.

Ultimately, the 1957 legislative session lasted 128 days, the longest in Oregon history. Overhulse was widely recognized for keeping the state senate on track throughout the session. In October of that year, a special legislative session was call to pass a tax relief bill. This was the result of increased tax revenue that produced a tax surplus. The legislature returned the surplus in the form of reduced taxes. Overhulse presided over the senate during the special session.

At that time, the President of the Senate served as acting governor whenever Oregon's elected governor left the state. During his two-year term as senate president, Overhulse was the acting governor on a number of occasions when Governor Holmes was traveling outside of the state.

== State senator ==
During the second half of his four-year senate term, a Democratic majority controlled the senate. The Democrats used their 19 to 11 majority to elect their long-time leader, Walter Pearson, as senate president. Pearson appointed Overhulse chairman of the senate's powerful State and Federal Affairs Committee. Overhulse served during the 1959 regular session from January 12 through May 6.

In 1960, Overhulse was re-elected to a second four-year term in the state senate representing District 17. He was unopposed in the Democratic primary and then defeated a popular state representative in the general election. The new senate President, Harry Boivin, appointed Overhulse to the state and federal affairs, judiciary, and labor and industries committees. He was also given the chairmanship of the Elections Committee.

Overhulse returned to the senate for 1963 legislative session. While he still represented Crook, Deschutes, Jefferson, and Lake counties, re-districting changed his senate district from District 17 to District 19. During that regular legislative session, Overhulse served as chairman of the Taxation Committee and was a members of the state and federal affairs, judiciary, elections, constitutional revisions, and public buildings and institutions committees. He also served during a short special session later that year. In February 1964, Overhulse announced that he would retire from the senate at the end of 1964 when his second term expired.

== Later life and legacy ==
After leaving the state senate, Overhulse returned to his law practice in Madras. He died of a heart attack at his home in Culver on January 2, 1966. He was 56 years old at the time of his death.

Overhulse's correspondence with constituents and other documents related to his service in the Oregon State Senate are held in the University of Oregon Library archives in Eugene, Oregon. It includes 3.0 linear feet (2 containers).

In 2014, his family presented a collection of Overhulse's personal memorabilia to the Jefferson County Historical Society. The collection included the gavel Overhulse used while he was senate president along with a scrapbook of news articles and photographs from his tenure.
