= Walter J. Pearson =

American politician

Oregon State Treasurer
- In office January 3, 1949 – January 5, 1953
- Preceded by: Leslie M. Scott
- Succeeded by: Sig Unander

42nd President of the Oregon Senate
- In office January 12, 1959 – January 9, 1961
- Preceded by: Boyd R. Overhulse
- Succeeded by: Harry D. Boivin

Member of the Oregon Senate
- In office January 8, 1945 – January 10, 1949; January 14, 1957 – February 1, 1966

Member of the Oregon House of Representatives
- In office January 11, 1943 – January 8, 1945; January 10, 1955 – January 14, 1957

Personal details
- Born: October 29, 1903 Bluefield, West Virginia, US
- Died: February 4, 1972 (aged 68) Portland, Oregon, US
- Party: Democratic
- Spouse: Dorothea

Walter J. Pearson (October 29, 1903 – February 4, 1972) was an American politician from the state of Oregon. A Democrat, Pearson served one term as Oregon State Treasurer, two terms in the Oregon House of Representatives, and four terms in the Oregon State Senate, including one term as president of the Oregon Senate.
