= 53rd Oregon Legislative Assembly =

←	52nd Legislative Assembly	54th Legislative Assembly	→
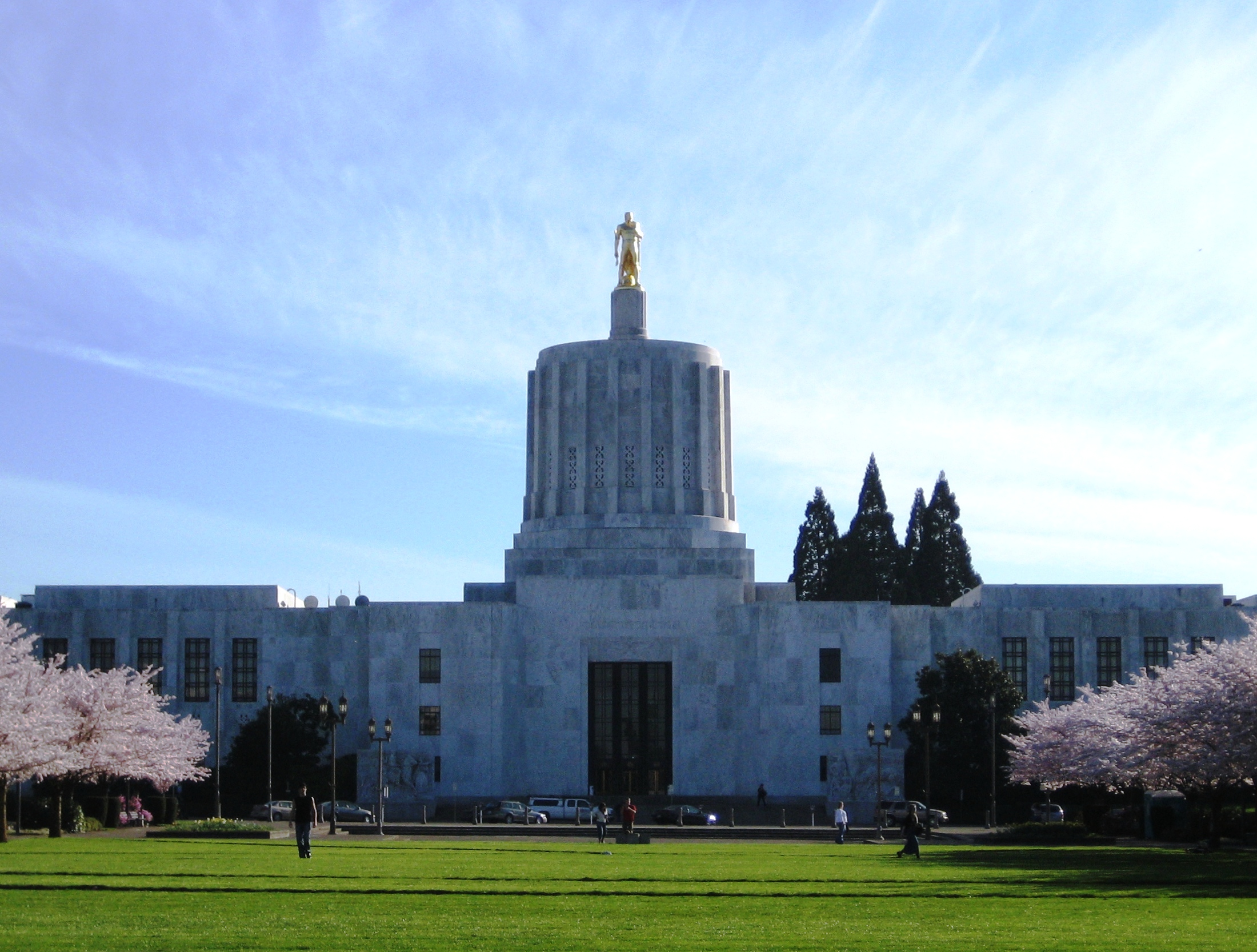
- The legislature took place in the Oregon State Capitol, seen here in 2007

Overview
- Legislative body: Oregon Legislative Assembly
- Jurisdiction: Oregon, United States
- Meeting place: Oregon State Capitol
- Term: 1965
- Website: www.oregonlegislature.gov

Oregon State Senate
- Members: 30 Senators
- Senate President: Harry D. Boivin (D)
- President Pro Tempore: Daniel Thiel (D)
- Party control: Democratic Party of Oregon

Oregon House of Representatives
- Members: 59 Representatives
- Speaker of the House: F. F. Montgomery (R)
- Speaker Pro Tempore: Robert Smith (R)
- Minority Leader: Ross Morgan (D)
- Party control: Republican Party of Oregon

The 53rd Oregon Legislative Assembly was the legislative session of the Oregon Legislative Assembly that convened on January 11, 1965 and adjourned May 14, 1965.

== Senate ==
Affiliation	Members
Democratic	19
Republican	11
Total	30
Government Majority	8

== Senate Members ==
Composition of the Senate
Senator	Residence	Party
Eddie Ahrens	Salem	Republican
Victor Atiyeh	Portland	Republican
Jack Bain	Portland	Democratic
Harry D. Boivin	Klamath Falls	Democratic
R. F. Chapman	Coos Bay	Democratic
Vernon Cook	Gresham	Democratic
Ward H. Cook	Portland	Democratic
Alice Corbett	Portland	Democratic
Robert L. Elfstrom	Salem	Republican
Edward Fadeley	Eugene	Democratic
Al Flegel	Roseburg	Democratic
Ted Hallock	Portland	Democratic
Donald R. Husband	Eugene	Republican
Glenn Huston	Eugene	Democratic
John Inskeep	Oregon City	Republican
Arthur P. Ireland	Forest Grove	Republican
Walter Leth	Salem	Republican
Thomas R. Mahoney	Portland	Democratic
Gordon W. McKay	Bend	Republican
Tom Monaghan	Milwaukie	Democratic
Ben Musa	The Dalles	Democratic
Andrew J. Naterlin	Newport	Democratic
L. W. Newbry	Ashland	Republican
Walter J. Pearson	Portland	Democratic
Eugene "Debbs" Potts	Grants Pass	Democratic
Raphael R. Raymond	Helix	Republican
Glen M. Stadler	Eugene	Democratic
Daniel Thiel	Astoria	Democratic
Don S. Willner	Lake Oswego	Democratic
Anthony Yturri	Ontario	Republican

== House ==
Affiliation	Members
Democratic	27
Republican	32
Total	59
Government Majority	5

== House Members ==
Composition of the House
House Member	Residence	Party
Jack W. Anunsen	Salem	Republican
Carl Back	Port Orford	Democratic
Cornelius C. Bateson	Salem	Democratic
Sidney Bazett	Grants Pass	Republican
James Bedingfield	Coos Bay	Republican
Jake Bennett	Portland	Democratic
Thomas A. Bessonette	Baker	Republican
Jason D. Boe	Reedsport	Democratic
Edward H. Branchfield	Medford	Republican
Fritzi Chuinard	Portland	Republican
Morris Crothers	Salem	Republican
L. B. Day	Salem	Democratic
John R. Dellenback	Medford	Republican
Gerald Detering	Harrisburg	Republican
Edward W. Elder	Eugene	Republican
Shirley Adele Field	Portland	Republican
George C. Flitcraft	Klamath Falls	Republican
William J. Gallagher	Portland	Republican
Richard E. Groener	Milwaukie	Democratic
William F. Gwinn	Albany	Republican
Beulah Hand	Milwaukie	Democratic
Paul Hanneman	Cloverdale	Republican
Stafford Hansell	Hermiston	Republican
Dale Morgan Harlan	Milwaukie	Democratic
William H. Holmstrom	Gearhart	Democratic
Norman R. Howard	Portland	Democratic
Carrol B. Howe	Klamath Falls	Republican
C. R. Hoyt	Corvallis	Republican
Lee Johnson	Portland	Republican
Sam Johnson	Redmond	Republican
Richard Kennedy	Eugene	Democratic
Phil Lang	Portland	Democratic
Sidney Leiken	Roseburg	Democratic
Berkeley Lent	Portland	Democratic
Harold V. Lewis	McMinnville	Democratic
Irvin Mann	Stanfield	Republican
Hugh McGilvra	Forest Grove	Republican
Donald McKinnis	Summerville	Democratic
Fred Meek	Portland	Republican
F. F. Montgomery	Eugene	Republican
Ross Morgan	Gresham	Democratic
John D. Mosser	Portland	Republican
Katherine Musa	The Dalles	Democratic
Juanita N. Orr	Lake Grove	Democratic
Stan Ouderkirk	Newsport	Republican
Bob Packwood	Portland	Republican
Elvin Paxson	Portland	Republican
Grace Olivier Peck	Portland	Democratic
Wally Priestley	Portland	Democratic
James A. Redden	Medford	Democratic
Joe B. Richards	Eugene	Republican
Joe Rogers	Independence	Republican
Keith Skelton	Eugene	Democratic
Robert Smith	Burns	Republican
Wayne Turner	St. Helens	Democratic
Edward J. Whelan	Portland	Democratic
Sam Wilderman	Portland	Democratic
Howard Willits	Portland	Democratic
Don Wilson	Eugene	Republican
