= 54th Oregon Legislative Assembly =

1967 term of Oregon Legislative Assembly

←	53rd Legislative Assembly	55th Legislative Assembly	→

Overview
- Legislative body: Oregon Legislative Assembly
- Jurisdiction: Oregon, United States
- Meeting place: Oregon State Capitol
- Term: 1967
- Website: www.oregonlegislature.gov

Oregon State Senate
- Members: 30 Senators
- Senate President: Eugene "Debbs" Potts (D)
- Party control: Democratic Party of Oregon

Oregon House of Representatives
- Members: 60 Representatives
- Speaker of the House: Monte Montgomery (R)
- Minority Leader: James A. Redden (D)
- Party control: Republican Party of Oregon

The 54th Oregon Legislative Assembly was the legislative session of the Oregon Legislative Assembly that convened on January 9, 1967, and adjourned June 14, 1967.

== Senate ==
Affiliation	Members
Democratic	19
Republican	11
Total	30
Government Majority	8

== Senate Members ==
Composition of the Senate
Senator	Residence	Party
Victor Atiyeh	Portland	Republican
Jack Bain	Portland	Democratic
Cornelius C. Bateson	Salem	Democratic
Harry D. Boivin	Klamath Falls	Democratic
John D. Burns	Portland	Democratic
R. F. Chapman	Coos Bay	Democratic
Vernon Cook	Gresham	Democratic
George Eivers	Milwaukie	Republican
Robert L. Elfstrom	Salem	Republican
Edward Fadeley	Eugene	Democratic
Albert G. Flegel	Roseburg	Democratic
Ted Hallock (Note: Appointed January 7, 1967)	Portland	Democratic
Donald R. Husband	Eugene	Republican
Glenn Huston	Lebanon	Democratic
John J. Inskeep	Oregon City	Republican
Arthur P. Ireland	Forest Grove	Republican
Berkeley Lent	Portland	Democratic
Walter Leth (Note: Resigned)	Salem	Republican
Thomas R. Mahoney	Portland	Democratic
Gordon W. McKay	Bend	Republican
Ross Morgan	Gresham	Democratic
Ben Musa	The Dalles	Democratic
Andrew J. Naterlin	Newport	Democratic
L. W. Newbry	Ashland	Republican
Eugene "Debbs" Potts	Grants Pass	Democratic
Raphael R. Raymond	Helix	Republican
Glen M. Stadler	Eugene	Democratic
Daniel A. Thiel	Astoria	Democratic
Don S. Willner	Lake Oswego	Democratic
Anthony Yturri	Ontario	Republican

== House ==
Affiliation	Members
Democratic	24
Republican	36
Total	60
Government Majority	12

== House Members ==
Composition of the House
House Member	Residence	Party
John W. Anunsen	Salem	Republican
Sidney Bazett	Grants Pass	Republican
James Bedingfield	Coos Bay	Republican
Jake Bennett	Portland	Democratic
Tom Bessonette	Baker City	Republican
Jason Boe	Reedsport	Democratic
Bill Bradley	Portland	Democratic
Wallace P. Carson Jr.	Salem	Republican
Fritzi Chuinard	Portland	Republican
Morris K. Crothers	Salem	Republican
Robert G. Davis	Medford	Republican
L. B. Day	Salem	Democratic
Gerald W. Detering	Harrisburg	Republican
Edward W. Elder	Eugene	Republican
Bob Elliott	Portland	Republican
George C. Flitcraft	Klamath Falls	Republican
David Frost	Hillsboro	Republican
Marva Graham	Portland	Republican
J. Ralph Guynes	West Linn	Democratic
William F. Gwinn	Albany	Republican
Paul Hanneman	Cloverdale	Republican
Stafford Hansell	Hermiston	Republican
Dale M. Harlan	Milwaukie	Democratic
Hank Hart	Medford	Republican
Tom Hartung	Portland	Republican
William H. Holmstrom	Gearhart	Democratic
Norman R. Howard	Portland	Democratic
Carrol B. Howe	Klamath Falls	Republican
Kenneth Jernstedt	Hood River	Republican
Lee Johnson	Portland	Democratic
Sam Johnson	Redmond	Democratic
Richard Kennedy	Eugene	Democratic
Phil Lang	Portland	Democratic
Sidney Leiken	Roseburg	Democratic
Harold V. Lewis	McMinnville	Democratic
Irvin Mann	Stanfield	Republican
Roger E. Martin	Lake Oswego	Republican
Connie McCready	Portland	Republican
Hugh McGilvra	Forest Grove	Republican
Roderick T. McKenzie	Sixes	Republican
Donald McKinnis	Summerville	Democratic
Fred Meek	Portland	Republican
Monte Montgomery	Eugene	Republican
Stan Ouderkirk	Newport	Republican
Bob Packwood	Portland	Republican
Grace Olivier Peck	Portland	Democratic
Wally S. Priestly	Portland	Democratic
James A. Redden	Medford	Democratic
Joe B. Richards	Eugene	Republican
Betty Roberts	Portland	Democratic
Frank L. Roberts	Portland	Democratic
Joe Rogers	Independence	Republican
Keith Skelton	Eugene	Democratic
Loren J. Smith (Note: Appointed to fill the vacancy of C. R. Hoyt, who was appointed to the senate on January 7, 1967)	Corvallis	Republican
Bob Smith	Burns	Republican
Bill Stevenson	Portland	Democratic
Leo Thornton	Milwaukie	Republican
Wayne Turner	St. Helens	Democratic
Howard D. Willits	Portland	Democratic
Don Wilson	Eugene	Republican
