= 1964 Oregon House of Representatives election =

- November 3, 1964

All 60 seats in the Oregon House of Representatives 31 seats needed for a majority

| | Majority party | Minority party |
|---|---|---|
| Leader | F. F. Montgomery | Clarence Barton (retired) |
| Party | Republican | Democratic |
| Leader's seat | 13th district | 16th district |
| Last election | 29 seats, 48.53% | 31 seats, 51.46% |
| Seats won | 32 | 28 |
| Popular vote | 1,134,119 | 1,191,390 |
| Percentage | 48.74% | 51.20% |
- Results by party Republican gain Republican hold Democratic gain Democratic hold
Speaker before election
Clarence Barton
Democratic
Elected Speaker
F. F. Montgomery
Republican

Elections to the Oregon House of Representatives were held on November 3, 1964, to elect 60 candidates to the House to serve two-year terms. The Republican Party won a majority of seats in the House for the first time since the 1954 general election, winning 32 seats to the Democratic Party's 28. Eight incumbents lost re-election; four Republicans and Democrats each. The 1964 election retained the 1962 plan drawn following the 1960 U.S. Census.

Following the election, outgoing minority leader F. F. "Monte" Montgomery of Lane County was elected speaker.

== District 1 ==
House District 1 contained all of Clatsop County and elected one representative.

District 1 election 1 to be elected
| Party | Candidate | Votes | % |
|---|---|---|---|
| Democratic | W. H. Holstrom (incumbent) | 8,088 | 65.41% |
| Republican | James Scarborough | 4,277 | 34.59% |
| Total votes | | 12,365 | 100.00% |

== District 2 ==
House District 2 contained all of Columbia County and elected one representative.

District 2 election 1 to be elected
| Party | Candidate | Votes | % |
|---|---|---|---|
| Democratic | Wayne Turner (incumbent) | 7,153 | 72.25% |
| Republican | Lawrence Meissner | 2,741 | 27.68% |
| Write-in | | 7 | 0.07% |
| Total votes | | 9,901 | 100.00% |

== District 3 ==
House District 3 contained all of Tillamook County and elected one representative.

District 3 election 1 to be elected
| Party | Candidate | Votes | % |
|---|---|---|---|
| Republican | Paul Hanneman | 4,077 | 54.29% |
| Democratic | Edward F. Ridderbusch (incumbent) | 3,432 | 45.71% |
| Total votes | | 7,509 | 100.00% |

== District 4 ==
House District 4 contained all of Washington County and elected three representatives. During the 1963 special legislative session, incumbent Republican Robert E. Jones resigned and Republican Hugh McGilvra was appointed to fill the vacancy.

District 4 election 3 to be elected
| Party | Candidate | Votes | % |
|---|---|---|---|
| Republican | Hugh McGilvra (incumbent) | 26,270 | 19.37% |
| Republican | John D. Mosser (incumbent) | 26,110 | 19.25% |
| Republican | Elwin Paxson | 25,167 | 18.56% |
| Democratic | John Alder | 21,070 | 15.54% |
| Democratic | Eva Brower | 18,909 | 13.94% |
| Democratic | Marvin L. Lain | 18,086 | 13.34% |
| Total votes | | 135,612 | 100.00% |

== District 5 ==
House District 5 contained all of Yamhill County and elected one representative.

District 5 election 1 to be elected
| Party | Candidate | Votes | % |
|---|---|---|---|
| Democratic | Harold D. Lewis | 7,320 | 52.35% |
| Republican | Merrill C. Hagan (incumbent) | 5,579 | 39.90% |
| Write-in | | 1,085 | 7.76% |
| Total votes | | 13,984 | 100.00% |

== District 6 ==
Legislative Districts of Multomah County, 1962

House District 6 contained all of Multnomah County and elected seventeen representatives. The county was split into five subdistricts containing between three or four members, and elected an additional representative at-large.

District 6 At-large subdistrict election 1 to be elected
| Party | Candidate | Votes | % |
|---|---|---|---|
| Democratic | Berkeley Lent (incumbent) | 119,290 | 57.06% |
| Republican | Clyde V. Brummell | 89,776 | 42.94% |
| Write-in | | 11 | 0.01% |
| Total votes | | 209,077 | 100.00% |

District 6 West subdistrict election 3 to be elected
| Party | Candidate | Votes | % |
|---|---|---|---|
| Republican | Shirley Adele Field (incumbent) | 22,543 | 20.54% |
| Republican | Lee Johnson | 22,003 | 20.04% |
| Republican | E. G. Chutnard (incumbent) | 20,045 | 18.26% |
| Democratic | James M. Gleason | 16,161 | 14.72% |
| Democratic | Hollis Ransom Jr. | 15,682 | 14.29% |
| Democratic | Dennis A. Day | 13,339 | 12.15% |
| Write-in | | 3 | 0.00% |
| Total votes | | 109,776 | 100.00% |

District 6 South City subdistrict election 3 to be elected
| Party | Candidate | Votes | % |
|---|---|---|---|
| Democratic | Grace Olivier Peck (incumbent) | 25,747 | 21.81% |
| Democratic | Phil Lang (incumbent) | 25,626 | 21.71% |
| Democratic | Norman R. Howard (incumbent) | 25,188 | 21.34% |
| Republican | Frederick S. Wilhelm | 14,737 | 12.48% |
| Republican | Jerold L. Billings | 13,578 | 11.50% |
| Republican | Stan L. Day | 13,152 | 11.14% |
| Write-in | | 12 | 0.01% |
| Total votes | | 118,040 | 100.00% |

District 6 East Central City subdistrict election 4 to be elected
| Party | Candidate | Votes | % |
|---|---|---|---|
| Republican | Bob Packwood (incumbent) | 29,376 | 14.38% |
| Republican | William J. Gallagher (incumbent) | 28,071 | 13.74% |
| Republican | Fred Meek (incumbent) | 26,540 | 12.99% |
| Democratic | Sam Wilderman | 26,351 | 12.90% |
| Republican | Gust Anderson | 26,029 | 12.74% |
| Democratic | Ronald W. Woody | 24,815 | 12.15% |
| Democratic | Harvey Akeson | 23,390 | 11.45% |
| Democratic | J. E. Bennett | 19,651 | 9.62% |
| Write-in | | 10 | 0.00% |
| Total votes | | 204,233 | 100.00% |

District 6 East County subdistrict election 3 to be elected
| Party | Candidate | Votes | % |
|---|---|---|---|
| Democratic | Ross Morgan (incumbent) | 34,013 | 22.75% |
| Democratic | Betty Roberts | 31,947 | 21.37% |
| Democratic | Howard Willits (incumbent) | 31,833 | 21.29% |
| Republican | George C. Rider | 20,220 | 13.52% |
| Republican | Robert S. Whisnant | 15,937 | 10.66% |
| Republican | Victor G. Wolf | 15,556 | 10.40% |
| Write-in | | 22 | 0.01% |
| Total votes | | 149,528 | 100.00% |

District 6 North City subdistrict election 3 to be elected
| Party | Candidate | Votes | % |
|---|---|---|---|
| Democratic | Edward J. Whelan (incumbent) | 23,792 | 24.62% |
| Democratic | Wally Priestly | 22,256 | 23.03% |
| Democratic | J. E. Bennett (incumbent) | 21,416 | 22.16% |
| Republican | Doug Gray | 10,692 | 11.06% |
| Republican | Don Burkett | 9,728 | 10.07% |
| Republican | Dennis Sands | 8,761 | 9.06% |
| Write-in | | 3 | 0.00% |
| Total votes | | 96,648 | 100.00% |

== District 7 ==
House District 7 contained all of Clackamas County and elected four representatives.

District 7 election 4 to be elected
| Party | Candidate | Votes | % |
|---|---|---|---|
| Democratic | Beulah Hand (incumbent) | 30,685 | 14.28% |
| Democratic | Richard E. Groener | 28,802 | 13.40% |
| Democratic | Juanita N. Orr (incumbent) | 28,463 | 13.24% |
| Democratic | Dale Morgan Harlan | 26,867 | 12.50% |
| Republican | Roger E. Martin | 26,530 | 12.34% |
| Republican | Robert P. Dickinson (incumbent) | 26,015 | 12.10% |
| Republican | Leo M. Thornton | 25,159 | 11.70% |
| Republican | George Eivers | 22,418 | 10.43% |
| Write-in | | 16 | 0.01% |
| Total votes | | 214,955 | 100.00% |

== District 8 ==
House District 8 contained all of Lincoln County and elected one representative.

District 8 election 1 to be elected
| Party | Candidate | Votes | % |
|---|---|---|---|
| Republican | W. Ouderkirk (incumbent) | 5,712 | 56.48% |
| Democratic | Robert Lawrence Cooper | 4,400 | 43.51% |
| Write-in | | 1 | 0.01% |
| Total votes | | 10,113 | 100.00% |

== District 9 ==
House District 9 contained all of Polk County and elected one representative.

District 9 election 1 to be elected
| Party | Candidate | Votes | % |
|---|---|---|---|
| Republican | Joe Rogers (incumbent) | 7,369 | 65.22% |
| Democratic | Emmet T. Rogers | 3,928 | 34.76% |
| Write-in | | 2 | 0.02% |
| Total votes | | 11,299 | 100.00% |

== District 10 ==
House District 10 contained all of Benton County and elected one representative.

District 10 election 1 to be elected
| Party | Candidate | Votes | % |
|---|---|---|---|
| Republican | C. R. Hoyt (incumbent) | 10,416 | 66.89% |
| Democratic | Alvin Jones | 5,156 | 33.11% |
| Total votes | | 15,572 | 100.00% |

== District 11 ==
House District 11 contained all of Marion County and elected four representatives.

District 11 election 4 to be elected
| Party | Candidate | Votes | % |
|---|---|---|---|
| Democratic | Cornelius C. Bateson (incumbent) | 29,929 | 15.82% |
| Republican | Morris K. Crothers (incumbent) | 26,752 | 14.14% |
| Republican | Jack Anunsen | 24,134 | 12.76% |
| Democratic | L. B. Day | 23,981 | 12.68% |
| Republican | Russell F. Bonesteele (incumbent) | 23,761 | 12.56% |
| Republican | Winton J. Hunt (incumbent) | 22,966 | 12.14% |
| Democratic | Steve Anderson | 19,962 | 10.55% |
| Democratic | David D. Kidd | 17,714 | 9.36% |
| Total votes | | 189,199 | 100.00% |

== District 12 ==
House District 12 contained all of Linn County and elected two representatives.

District 12 election 2 to be elected
| Party | Candidate | Votes | % |
|---|---|---|---|
| Republican | Gerald W. Detering (incumbent) | 12,179 | 28.48% |
| Republican | William F. Gwinn | 11,951 | 27.95% |
| Democratic | Maurice Orona | 10,107 | 23.63% |
| Democratic | Ulas R. Moss | 8,443 | 19.74% |
| Write-in | | 86 | 0.20% |
| Total votes | | 42,766 | 100.00% |

== District 13 ==
House District 13 contained all of Lane County and elected five representatives.

District 13 election 5 to be elected
| Party | Candidate | Votes | % |
|---|---|---|---|
| Republican | F. F. Montgomery (incumbent) | 42,197 | 11.92% |
| Democratic | Keith Skelton | 38,525 | 10.88% |
| Democratic | Richard L. Kennedy (incumbent) | 38,388 | 10.84% |
| Republican | Edward W. Elder (incumbent) | 38,058 | 10.75% |
| Republican | Joe B . Richards | 35,896 | 10.14% |
| Democratic | Veola Peterson Wilmot (incumbent) | 35,503 | 10.03% |
| Republican | Jo Kittredge | 35,425 | 10.01% |
| Democratic | Richard O. Eyemann (incumbent) | 33,784 | 9.54% |
| Democratic | Patrick M. Flynn | 30,742 | 8.68% |
| Republican | John V. Northam | 25,474 | 7.20% |
| Write-in | | 20 | 0.01% |
| Total votes | | 354,012 | 100.00% |

== District 14 ==
House District 14 contained all of Benton and Lane counties and elected one representative. Districts 10 and 13 were embedded within it; these two counties and three districts combined elected seven representatives.

District 14 election 1 to be elected
| Party | Candidate | Votes | % |
|---|---|---|---|
| Republican | Don Wilson | 44,217 | 51.20% |
| Democratic | Wickes Shaw Beal | 42,150 | 48.80% |
| Total votes | | 86,367 | 100.00% |

== District 15 ==
House District 15 contained all of Douglas County and elected two representatives. Prior to the 1963 special legislative session, incumbent Democrat W. O. Kelsay died in a car crash and Democrat Elizabeth Kelsay was appointed to fill the vacancy.

District 15 election 2 to be elected
| Party | Candidate | Votes | % |
|---|---|---|---|
| Democratic | Sidney Leiken (incumbent) | 12,899 | 26.22% |
| Democratic | Jason D. Boe | 12,631 | 25.67% |
| Republican | Dudley C. Walton | 11,970 | 24.33% |
| Republican | Thomas H. Pargeter | 11,700 | 23.78% |
| Total votes | | 49,200 | 100.00% |

== District 16 ==
House District 16 contained all of Coos County and elected one representative.

District 16 election 1 to be elected
| Party | Candidate | Votes | % |
|---|---|---|---|
| Republican | James Bedingfield | 10,758 | 51.73% |
| Democratic | Willis A. Sutton | 10,038 | 48.27% |
| Total votes | | 20,796 | 100.00% |

== District 17 ==
House District 17 contained all of Coos and Curry counties and elected one representative. District 16 was embedded within it; these two counties and districts combined elected two representatives.

District 17 election 1 to be elected
| Party | Candidate | Votes | % |
|---|---|---|---|
| Democratic | Carl Back (incumbent) | 12,708 | 50.68% |
| Republican | Rod McKenzie | 12,369 | 49.32% |
| Total votes | | 25,077 | 100.00% |

== District 18 ==
House District 18 contained all of Josephine County and elected one representative.

District 18 election 1 to be elected
| Party | Candidate | Votes | % |
|---|---|---|---|
| Republican | Sid Bazett (incumbent) | 7,918 | 58.93% |
| Democratic | John V. Rafferty | 5,518 | 41.07% |
| Total votes | | 13,436 | 100.00% |

== District 19 ==
House District 19 contained all of Jackson County and elected three representatives.

District 19 election 3 to be elected
| Party | Candidate | Votes | % |
|---|---|---|---|
| Republican | John R. Dellenback (incumbent) | 18,975 | 19.76% |
| Republican | Edward H. Branchfield (incumbent) | 17,386 | 18.10% |
| Democratic | James A. Redden (incumbent) | 17,315 | 18.03% |
| Republican | Richard H. Travis | 14,858 | 15.47% |
| Democratic | E. M. Madden | 14,583 | 15.18% |
| Democratic | Thomas J. Reeder | 12,911 | 13.44% |
| Write-in | | 20 | 0.02% |
| Total votes | | 96,048 | 100.00% |

== District 20 ==
House District 20 contained all of Klamath County and elected one representative.

District 20 election 1 to be elected
| Party | Candidate | Votes | % |
|---|---|---|---|
| Republican | Carrol Howe (incumbent) | 10,944 | 63.38% |
| Democratic | Phyllis Rutledge | 6,324 | 36.62% |
| Total votes | | 17,268 | 100.00% |

== District 21 ==
House District 21 contained all of Crook, Deschutes, and Jefferson counties and elected one representative.

District 21 election 1 to be elected
| Party | Candidate | Votes | % |
|---|---|---|---|
| Republican | Sam Johnson | 9,424 | 56.63% |
| Democratic | Ben Evick | 7,218 | 43.37% |
| Total votes | | 16,642 | 100.00% |

== District 22 ==
House District 22 contained all of Hood River and Wasco counties and elected one representative.

District 22 election 1 to be elected
| Party | Candidate | Votes | % |
|---|---|---|---|
| Democratic | Katherine Musa (incumbent) | 8,207 | 60.25% |
| Republican | David H. Larsen | 5,415 | 39.75% |
| Total votes | | 13,622 | 100.00% |

== District 23 ==
House District 23 contained all of Umatilla County and elected one representative.

District 23 election 1 to be elected
| Party | Candidate | Votes | % |
|---|---|---|---|
| Republican | Stafford Hansell (incumbent) | 13,558 | 99.90% |
| Write-in | | 14 | 0.10% |
| Total votes | | 13,572 | 100.00% |

== District 24 ==
House District 24 contained all of Union and Wallowa counties and elected one representative.

District 24 election 1 to be elected
| Party | Candidate | Votes | % |
|---|---|---|---|
| Democratic | Don McKinnis (incumbent) | 6,383 | 63.10% |
| Republican | H. R. Weatherford | 3,733 | 36.90% |
| Total votes | | 10,116 | 100.00% |

== District 25 ==
House District 25 contained all of Baker and Grant counties and elected one representative.

District 25 election 1 to be elected
| Party | Candidate | Votes | % |
|---|---|---|---|
| Republican | Tom Bessonette | 5,153 | 55.08% |
| Democratic | Clinton P. Haight (incumbent) | 4,202 | 44.92% |
| Total votes | | 9,355 | 100.00% |

== District 26 ==
House District 26 contained all of Harney and Malheur counties and elected one representative.

District 26 election 1 to be elected
| Party | Candidate | Votes | % |
|---|---|---|---|
| Republican | Bob Smith (incumbent) | 9,011 | 99.87% |
| Write-in | | 12 | 0.13% |
| Total votes | | 9,023 | 100.00% |

== District 27 ==
House District 27 contained all of Klamath and Lake counties and elected one representative. District 20 was embedded within it; these two counties and districts combined elected two representatives.

District 27 election 1 to be elected
| Party | Candidate | Votes | % |
|---|---|---|---|
| Republican | George C. Flitcraft (incumbent) | 11,947 | 60.64% |
| Democratic | Jerry Rutledge | 7,755 | 39.36% |
| Total votes | | 19,702 | 100.00% |

== District 28 ==
House District 28 contained all of Gilliam, Morrow, Sherman, Umatilla, and Wheeler counties and elected one representative. District 23 was embedded within it; these two counties and districts combined elected two representatives.

District 28 election 1 to be elected
| Party | Candidate | Votes | % |
|---|---|---|---|
| Republican | Irvin Mann Jr. | 11,406 | 51.80% |
| Democratic | Martin H. Buchanan | 10,614 | 48.20% |
| Total votes | | 22,020 | 100.00% |

== See also ==
- 1964 United States presidential election in Oregon
- List of Oregon Legislative Assemblies
