= 52nd Oregon Legislative Assembly =

←	51st Legislative Assembly	53rd Legislative Assembly	→
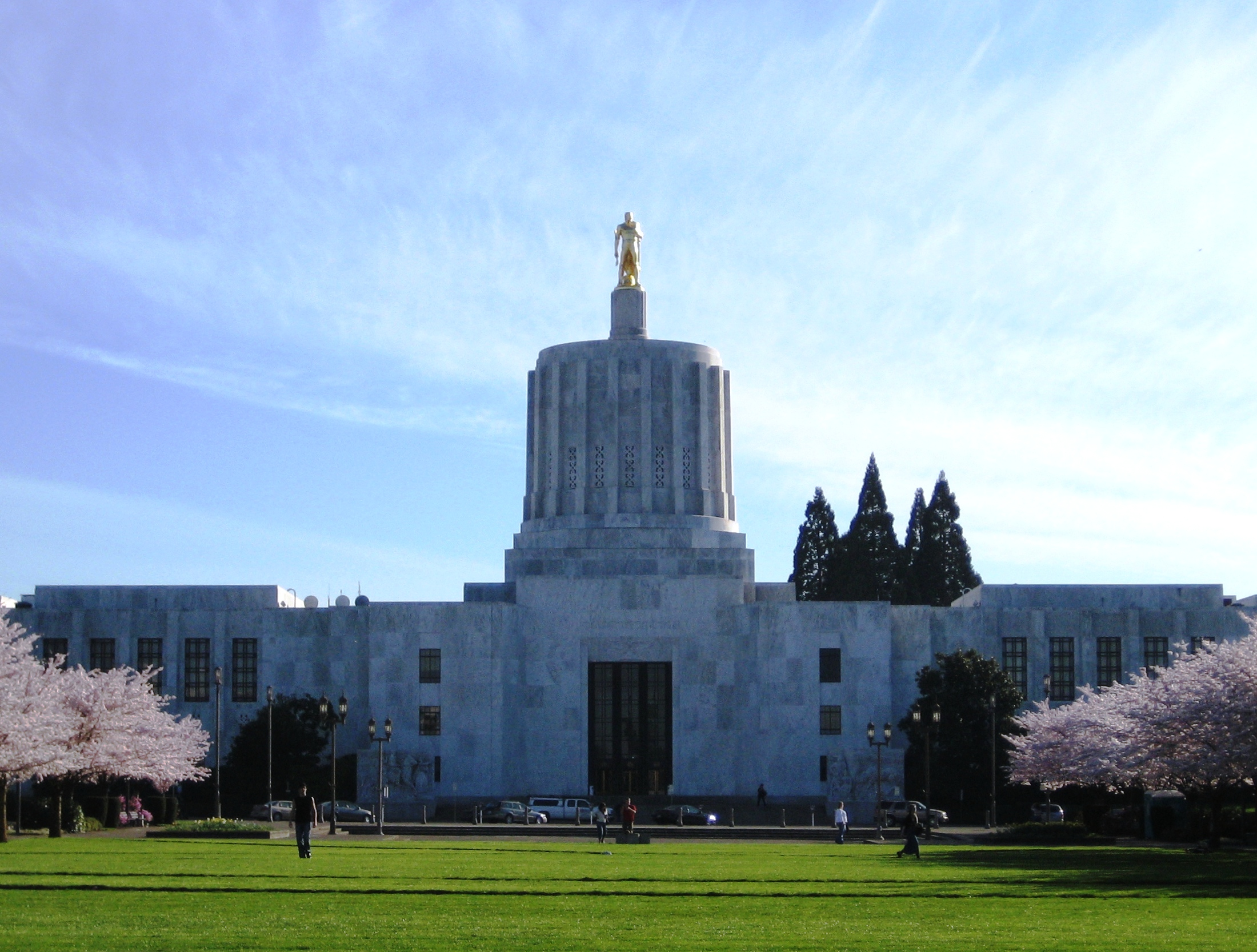
- The legislature took place in the Oregon State Capitol, seen here in 2007

Overview
- Legislative body: Oregon Legislative Assembly
- Jurisdiction: Oregon, United States
- Meeting place: Oregon State Capitol
- Term: 1963
- Website: www.oregonlegislature.gov

Oregon State Senate
- Members: 30 Senators
- Senate President: Ben Musa (D)
- President Pro Tempore: Dwight H. Hopkins (D)
- Party control: Democratic Party of Oregon

Oregon House of Representatives
- Members: 60 Representatives
- Speaker of the House: Clarence Barton
- Speaker Pro Tempore: Richard O. Eymann (D)
- Minority Leader: F. F. Montgomery (R)
- Party control: Democratic Party of Oregon

The 52nd Oregon Legislative Assembly was the legislative session of the Oregon Legislative Assembly that convened on January 14, 1963, and adjourned June 3, 1963.

== Senate ==
Affiliation	Members
Democratic	21
Republican	9
Total	30
Government Majority	12

== Senate Members ==
Composition of the Senate
Senator	Residence	Party
Eddie Ahrens	Turner	Republican
Harry D. Boivin	Klamath Falls	Democratic
R. F. Chapman	Coos Bay	Democratic
Vern Cook	Gresham	Democratic
Ward H. Cook	Portland	Democratic
Alfred H. Corbett	Portland	Democratic
Alice Corbett	Portland	Democratic
Robert L. Elfstrom	Salem	Republican
Edward Fadeley	Eugene	Democratic
Al Flegel	Roseburg	Democratic
Ted Hallock	Portland	Democratic
John D. Hare	Hillsboro	Republican
Dwight H. Hopkins	Imbler	Democratic
Donald R. Husband	Eugene	Republican
Glenn Huston	Lebanon	Democratic
John J. Inskeep	Oregon City	Republican
Arthur P. Ireland	Forest Grove	Republican
Walter C. Leth	Salem	Republican
Thomas R. Mahoney	Portland	Democratic
Tom Monaghan	Milwaukie	Democratic
Ben Musa	The Dalles	Democratic
Andrew J. Naterlin	Newport	Democratic
L. W. Newbry	Ashland	Republican
Boyd Overhulse	Madras	Democratic
Walter J. Pearson	Portland	Democratic
Eugene "Debbs" Potts	Grants Pass	Democratic
Glen M. Stadler	Eugene	Democratic
Daniel A. Thiel	Astoria	Democratic
Don S. Willner	Lake Oswego	Democratic
Anthony Yturri	Ontario	Republican

== House ==
Affiliation	Members
Democratic	31
Republican	29
Total	60
Government Majority	2

== House Members ==
Composition of the House
House Member	Residence	Party
Victor Atiyeh	Portland	Republican
Carl Back	Port Orford	Democratic
Clarence Barton	Coquille	Democratic
Cornelius C. Bateson	Salem	Democratic
Sidney Bazett	Grants Pass	Republican
J. E. Bennett	Portland	Democratic
Russell F. Bonesteele	Salem	Republican
Edward H. Branchfield	Medford	Republican
Kessler R. Cannon	Bend	Republican
Bob Chappel	Portland	Republican
Fritzi Chuinard	Portland	Republican
Morris K. Crothers	Salem	Republican
John R. Dellenback	Medford	Republican
Gerald W. Detering	Harrisburg	Republican
Robert P. Dickinson	Lake Oswego	Republican
Ray Dooley	Portland	Democratic
Edward W. Elder	Eugene	Republican
Richard O. Eymann	Marcola	Democratic
Shirley A. Field	Portland	Republican
George C. Flitcraft	Klamath Falls	Republican
William J. Gallagher	Portland	Republican
Merrill C. Hagan	McMinnville	Republican
Clinton P. Haight	Baker	Democratic
Beluah Hand	Milwaukie	Democratic
Stafford Hansell	Hermiston	Republican
William H. Holmstrom	Gearhart	Democratic
Norman Howard	Portland	Democratic
Carrol B. Howe	Klamath Falls	Republican
C. R. Hoyt	Corvallis	Republican
Eugene G. Hulett	Eugene	Democratic
Winton J. Hunt	Woodburn	Republican
Robert E. Jones	Portland	Republican
W. O. Kelsay	Roseburg	Democratic
Richard Kennedy	Eugene	Democratic
Nancy Kirkpatrick	Lebanon	Democratic
Phil Lang	Portland	Democratic
Sidney Leiken	Roseburg	Democratic
Berkeley Lent	Portland	Democratic
Ken Maher	Portland	Republican
Donald L. McBain	Gresham	Democratic
Elmer McClure	Milwaukie	Democratic
Don McKinnis	Summerville	Democratic
Fred Meek	Portland	Republican
F. F. Montgomery	Eugene	Republican
Ross Morgan	Gresham	Democratic
John D. Mosser	Portland	Republican
Katherine Musa	The Dalles	Democratic
Juanita N. Orr	Lake Grove	Democratic
W. Ouderkirk	Newport	Republican
Robert W. Packwood	Portland	Republican
Grace Olivier Peck	Portland	Democratic
James A. Redden	Medford	Democratic
Edward F. Ridderbusch	Tillamook	Democratic
Joe Rogers	Independence	Republican
Jack L. Smith	Condon	Democratic
Bob Smith	Burns	Republican
Wayne Turner	St. Helens	Democratic
Edward J. Whelan	Portland	Democratic
Howard D. Willits	Portland	Democratic
Veola Peterson Wilmont	Eugene	Democratic

== Legislation ==
Regular session

Special session
