= 55th Oregon Legislative Assembly =

←	54th Legislative Assembly	56th Legislative Assembly	→
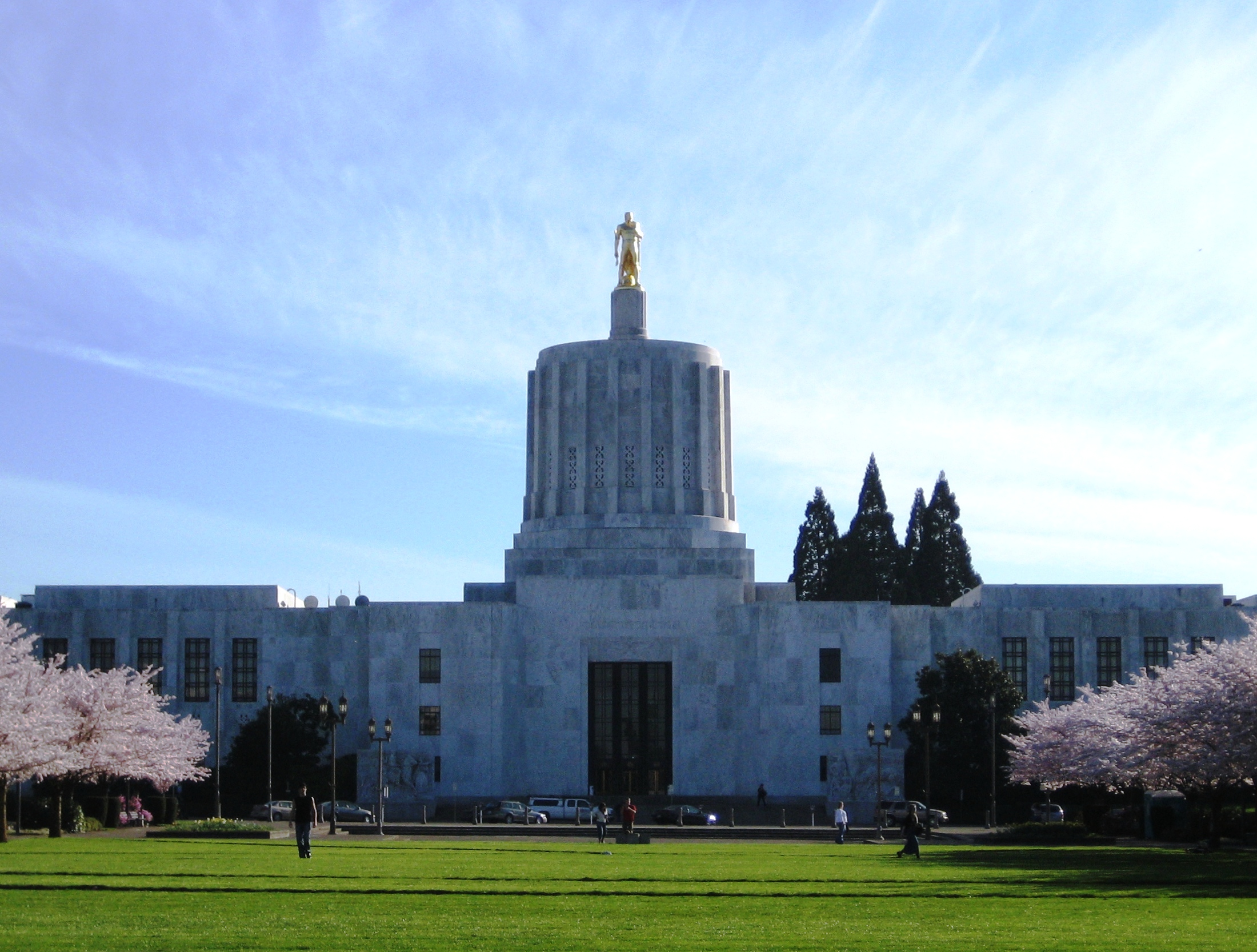
- The legislature took place in the Oregon State Capitol, seen here in 2007

Overview
- Legislative body: Oregon Legislative Assembly
- Jurisdiction: Oregon, United States
- Meeting place: Oregon State Capitol
- Term: 1969
- Website: www.oregonlegislature.gov

Oregon State Senate
- Members: 30 Senators
- Senate President: Eugene "Debbs" Potts (D)
- Party control: Democratic Party of Oregon

Oregon House of Representatives
- Members: 60 Representatives
- Speaker of the House: Robert F. Smith (R)
- Majority Leader: Wallace P. Carson (R)
- Minority Leader: Jason Boe (D)
- Party control: Republican Party of Oregon

The 55th Oregon Legislative Assembly was the legislative session of the Oregon Legislative Assembly that convened on January 13, 1969, and adjourned May 23, 1969.

== Senate ==
Affiliation	Members
Democratic	16
Republican	14
Total	30
Government Majority	2

== Senate Members ==
Composition of the Senate
Senator	Residence	Party
Victor Atiyeh	Portland	Republican
Jack Bain	Portland	Democratic
Cornelius C. Bateson	Salem	Democratic
Harry D. Burns	Portland	Democratic
Vernon Cook	Gresham	Democratic
Sam Dement	Myrtle Point	Republican
George Eivers	Milwaukie	Republican
Robert L. Elfstrom	Salem	Republican
Edward Fadeley	Eugene	Democratic
Albert G. Flegel	Roseburg	Democratic
Ted Hallock	Portland	Democratic
W. H. Holstrom	Gearhart	Democratic
C. R. Hoyt	Corvallis	Republican
Donald R. Husband	Eugene	Republican
Glenn Huston	Lebanon	Democratic
John J. Inskeep	Oregon City	Republican
Arthur P. Ireland	Forest Grove	Republican
Kenneth Jernstedt	Hood River	Republican
Berkeley Lent	Portland	Democratic
Gordon McKay	Bend	Republican
Ross Morgan	Gresham	Democratic
L. W. Newbry	Talent	Republican
W. S. Ouderkirk	Newport	Republican
Eugene "Debbs" Potts	Grants Pass	Democratic
Raphael R. Raymond	Helix	Republican
Betty Roberts	Portland	Democratic
R. E. Schedeen	Gresham	Democratic
Glen M. Stadler	Eugene	Democratic
Don S. Willner	Lake Oswego	Democratic
Anthony Yturri	Ontario	Republican

== House ==
Affiliation	Members
Democratic	18
Republican	41
Total	60
Government Majority	23

== House Members ==
Composition of the House
House Member	Residence	Party
Harvey Akeson	Portland	Democratic
Jack Anunsen	Salem	Republican
Sidney Bazett	Grants Pass	Republican
Jake Bennett	Portland	Democratic
Jason Boe	Reedsport	Democratic
Bill Bradley	Portland	Democratic
Betty W. Browne	Oakridge	Democratic
Wallace P. Carson Jr.	Salem	Republican
Fritzi E. Chuinard	Portland	Republican
Gwen T. Coffin (Note: Appointed on April 17, 1969 to fill the seat of Keith M. Wilson, who resigned on April 11, 1969.)	Enterprise	Democratic
George F. Cole	Seaside	Democratic
Morris K. Crothers	Salem	Republican
Robert G. Davis	Medford	Republican
L. B. Day	Salem	Republican
Gerald W. Detering	Harrisburg	Republican
William Dielschneider	The Dalles	Republican
Robert E. Dugdale	Portland	Republican
Robert A. Elliott	Portland	Republican
Richard O. Eymann	Springfield	Democratic
David G. Frost	Portland	Republican
Douglas W. Graham	Portland	Republican
Dick Groener	Milwaukie	Democratic
William F. Gwinn	Albany	Republican
Harl H. Haas Jr.	Portland	Republican
Paul Hanneman	Cloverdale	Republican
Stafford Hansell	Hermiston	Republican
Floyd H. Hart	Medford	Republican
Tom Hartung	Portland	Republican
Fred W. Heard	Klamath Falls	Democratic
Norman R. Howard	Portland	Democratic
Carrol B. Howe	Klamath Falls	Republican
Robert C. Ingalls	Corvallis	Republican
Sam Johnson	Redmond	Republican
Richard Kennedy	Eugene	Democratic
Phil Lang	Portland	Democratic
Gordon L. Macpherson	Waldport	Republican
Irvin Mann Jr.	Stanfield	Republican
William E. Markham	Riddle	Republican
Roger E. Martin	Lake Oswego	Republican
Connie McCready	Portland	Republican
Hugh McGilvra	Forest Grove	Republican
Anthony Meeker	Amity	Republican
Grace Olivier Peck	Portland	Democratic
Wally S. Priestley	Portland	Democratic
Allen B. Pynn	West Linn	Republican
Joe B. Richards	Eugene	Republican
Jack Ripper	North Bend	Democratic
Frank L. Roberts	Portland	Democratic
Joe Rogers	Independence	Republican
Bob Smith	Burns	Republican
Donald L. Stathos	Jacksonville	Republican
Bill Stevenson	Portland	Republican
Leo M. Thornton	Milwaukie	Republican
Wayne Turner	St. Helens	Republican
Howard Willits	Portland	Republican
Don Wilson	Eugene	Republican
Keith M. Wilson (Note: Wilson resigned on April 11, 1969. Gwen T. Coffin was appointed on April 17, 1969 to fill the vacancy.)	Joseph	Democratic
George F. Wingard	Eugene	Republican
Thomas F. Young	Baker	Republican
