= 1970 Oregon State Senate election =

- November 3, 1970

16 of 30 seats in the Oregon State Senate (15 regular, 1 unexpired) 16 seats needed for a majority
	Majority party	Minority party
Leader	Debbs Potts	Athony Yturri
Party	Democratic	Republican
Leader's seat	6th district	16th district
Seats before	16	14
Seats won	9	7
Seats after	16	14
Popular vote	603,339	466,752
Percentage	56.38%	43.62%
- Results by party Democratic gain Democratic hold Republican gain Republican hold No election
Senate President before election
Debbs Potts
Democratic
Elected Senate President
John Burns
Democratic

Elections to the Oregon State Senate were held on November 3, 1970, to elect 15 candidates to the Senate to serve four-year terms, and one to fill the two-year remainder of one unexpired term. The Democratic Party won 9 seats to the Republicans' 7, resulting in a Senate composition of 16 Democrats and 14 Republicans, with no net gain for either party, though six seats switched hands.

At the opening of the 1971 session on January 11, senators became deadlocked for 12 days as they repeatedly failed to elect a new Senate President. During the first week of the session, fifteen 15–15 tied votes were tallied between the same two candidates: Democrat Berkeley Lent, backed by the liberal Democratic caucus, and Republican L. W. Newbry, backed by all the Republicans and conservative Democrat Debbs Potts. Potts had led a conservative Democrat-Republican coalition during the 1967 and 1969 sessions. During the deadlock, Democratic senators repeatedly attempted to convince Potts to join the rest of the Democrats. On January 22, after the 54th tied vote, Portland Democrat John Burns announced to the chamber that he would nominate himself with the support of Potts and the entire Republican caucus. Taken by surprise, Senate Democrats attempted to call a recess and then proceeded to leave the chamber to prevent a quorum. On the 55th ballot, Burns was elected President 16–14, voting for himself over Lent.

This election used the same district boundaries used for the 1962–1968 general elections passed after the 1960 U.S. census. Since the passing of a 1965 law, senators in multi-member districts were elected to designated single-member positions beginning with the 1966 election, as opposed to plurality block voting which had been used previously. Incumbent senators in multi-member districts were assigned numbers based on their vote totals at their most recent general election, with the highest voted candidate getting position 1, second-highest position 2, and so on. This was Oregon's last state senate election to use a mix of single-member, multi-member, and floterial districts to elect senators, as for the 1972 election, all state legislators would be elected from single-member districts for the first time. Primary elections were held on May 26.

== Summary ==
Partisan makeup following the 1968 election
Republican
Democratic
Split delegation

Partisan makeup following the 1970 election
Republican
Democratic
Split delegation

== District 1 ==
Senate District 1 contained all of Marion County and elected two senators.

=== Position 1 ===
District 1 position 1 Democratic primary election
Party	Candidate	Votes	%
Democratic	Keith A. Burbidge	9,771	100.00%
Total votes		9,771	100.00%

District 1 position 1 Republican primary election
Party	Candidate	Votes	%
Republican	Robert L. Elfstrom (incumbent)	16,641	100.00%
Total votes		16,641	100.00%

District 1 position 1 election
Party	Candidate	Votes	%
Democratic	Keith A. Burbidge	22,907	52.94%
Republican	Robert L. Elfstrom (incumbent)	20,364	47.06%
Total votes		43,271	100.00%
Democratic gain from Republican			

=== Position 2 ===
Incumbent Democratic senator Cornelius C. Bateson resigned his seat to serve as Oregon Commissioner of Insurance.

District 1 position 2 Democratic primary election
Party	Candidate	Votes	%
Democratic	Thomas E. Bachelder	8,998	66.84%
Democratic	Hartley B. Campbell	4,463	33.16%
Total votes		13,461	100.00%

District 1 position 2 Republican primary election
Party	Candidate	Votes	%
Republican	Wallace P. Carson Jr.	15,994	100.00%
Total votes		15,994	100.00%

District 1 position 2 election
Party	Candidate	Votes	%
Republican	Wallace P. Carson Jr.	25,227	59.22%
Democratic	Thomas E. Bachelder	17,370	40.78%
Write-in		2	0.00%
Total votes		42,599	100.00%
Republican gain from Democratic			

== District 2 ==
Senate District 2 contained all of Linn County and elected one senator.

District 2 Democratic primary election
Party	Candidate	Votes	%
Democratic	Glenn Huston (incumbent)	6,658	100.00%
Total votes		6,658	100.00%

District 2 Republican primary election
Party	Candidate	Votes	%
Republican	Hector MacPherson Jr.	3,943	57.28%
Republican	Joel D. Fosdick	2,941	42.72%
Total votes		6,884	100.00%

District 2 election
Party	Candidate	Votes	%
Republican	Hector MacPherson Jr.	10,159	50.70%
Democratic	Glenn Huston (incumbent)	9,879	49.30%
Total votes		20,038	100.00%
Republican gain from Democratic			

== District 3 ==
Senate District 3 contained all of Lane County and elected three senators.

=== Position 1 ===
District 3 position 1 Democratic primary election
Party	Candidate	Votes	%
Democratic	Edward N. Fadeley (incumbent)	22,399	77.74%
Democratic	William W. Wooten	6,415	22.26%
Total votes		28,814	100.00%

District 3 position 1 Republican primary election
Party	Candidate	Votes	%
Republican	Randy Miller	12,512	59.84%
Republican	Earl L. Neet	8,397	40.16%
Total votes		20,909	100.00%

District 3 position 1 election
Party	Candidate	Votes	%
Democratic	Edward N. Fadeley (incumbent)	38,596	61.12%
Republican	Randy Miller	24,553	38.88%
Total votes		63,149	100.00%

=== Position 2 ===
District 3 position 2 Democratic primary election
Party	Candidate	Votes	%
Democratic	Betty Browne	22,453	100.00%
Total votes		22,453	100.00%

District 3 position 2 Republican primary election
Party	Candidate	Votes	%
Republican	Donald R. Husband (incumbent)	12,853	55.46%
Republican	Paul S. Holbo	8,377	36.15%
Republican	James Curtis Daniel	1,945	8.39%
Total votes		23,175	100.00%

District 3 position 2 election
Party	Candidate	Votes	%
Democratic	Betty Browne	39,580	62.54%
Republican	Donald R. Husband (incumbent)	23,705	37.46%
Total votes		63,285	100.00%
Democratic gain from Republican			

=== Position 3 ===
Incumbent Democratic senator Glenn M. Stadler declined to seek re-election.

District 3 position 3 Democratic primary election
Party	Candidate	Votes	%
Democratic	Raymond C. Swanson	19,612	100.00%
Total votes		19,612	100.00%

District 3 position 3 Republican primary election
Party	Candidate	Votes	%
Republican	George Wingard	16,823	73.42%
Republican	Bert Fegles	6,091	26.58%
Total votes		22,914	100.00%

District 3 position 3 election
Party	Candidate	Votes	%
Republican	George Wingard	33,524	54.30%
Democratic	Raymond C. Swanson	28,214	45.70%
Total votes		61,738	100.00%
Republican gain from Democratic			

== District 4 (2-year term) ==
A special election was held in District 4 to fill the remaining two years of Democrat Al Flegel's term after he was appointed to the Douglas County Commission. Senate District 4 contained all of Douglas County and elected one senator.

District 4 Democratic primary election (2-year term)
Party	Candidate	Votes	%
Democratic	Jason Boe	6,791	100.00%
Total votes		6,791	100.00%

District 4 Republican primary election (2-year term)
Party	Candidate	Votes	%
Write-in	William L. Lasswell	981	100.00%
Total votes		981	100.00%

District 4 election (2-year term)
Party	Candidate	Votes	%
Democratic	Jason Boe	10,968	54.22%
Republican	William L. Lasswell	9,258	45.76%
Write-in		4	0.02%
Total votes		20,230	100.00%
Democratic hold			

== District 5 ==
Senate District 5 contained all of Jackson County and elected one senator.

District 5 Democratic primary election
Party	Candidate	Votes	%
Write-in	Harold G. Morris	380	100.00%
Total votes		380	100.00%

District 5 Republican primary election
Party	Candidate	Votes	%
Republican	Lynn Newbry (incumbent)	8,825	100.00%
Total votes		8,825	100.00%

District 5 election
Party	Candidate	Votes	%
Republican	Lynn Newbry (incumbent)	17,734	66.07%
Democratic	Harold G. Morris	9,108	33.93%
Total votes		26,842	100.00%

== District 8 ==
Senate District 8 contained all of Washington and Yamhill counties and elected one senator. Incumbent Republican senator Arthur P. Ireland declined to seek re-election.

District 8 Democratic primary election
Party	Candidate	Votes	%
Democratic	Lyell B. Gardner	16,285	100.00%
Total votes		16,285	100.00%

District 8 Republican primary election
Party	Candidate	Votes	%
Republican	Tom Hartung	18,557	77.53%
Republican	Bernard B. Marsh	5,379	22.47%
Total votes		23,936	100.00%

District 8 election
Party	Candidate	Votes	%
Republican	Tom Hartung	33,169	56.41%
Democratic	Lyell B. Gardner	25,631	43.59%
Total votes		58,800	100.00%
Republican hold			

== District 10 ==
Senate District 10 contained all of Benton and Polk counties and elected one senator.

District 10 Democratic primary election
Party	Candidate	Votes	%
Democratic	Clifford W. Trow	6,788	100.00%
Total votes		6,788	100.00%

District 10 Republican primary election
Party	Candidate	Votes	%
Republican	Dick Hoyt (incumbent)	10,491	100.00%
Total votes		10,491	100.00%

District 10 election
Party	Candidate	Votes	%
Republican	Dick Hoyt (incumbent)	14,125	56.07%
Democratic	Clifford W. Trow	11,068	43.93%
Total votes		25,193	100.00%

== District 11 ==
Senate District 11 contained all of Clackamas County and elected two senators.

=== Position 1 ===
District 11 position 1 Democratic primary election
Party	Candidate	Votes	%
Democratic	Dick Groener	11,982	68.32%
Democratic	Dan Dority	5,556	31.68%
Total votes		17,538	100.00%

District 11 position 1 Republican primary election
Party	Candidate	Votes	%
Republican	John J. Inskeep (incumbent)	13,540	100.00%
Total votes		13,540	100.00%

District 11 position 1 election
Party	Candidate	Votes	%
Democratic	Dick Groener	27,196	52.09%
Republican	John J. Inskeep (incumbent)	25,010	47.90%
Write-in		8	0.02%
Total votes		52,214	100.00%
Democratic gain from Republican			

=== Position 2 ===
District 11 position 2 Democratic primary election
Party	Candidate	Votes	%
Democratic	Beulah Hand	12,870	100.00%
Total votes		12,870	100.00%

District 11 position 2 Republican primary election
Party	Candidate	Votes	%
Republican	George Elvers (incumbent)	12,663	100.00%
Total votes		12,663	100.00%

District 11 position 2 election
Party	Candidate	Votes	%
Republican	George Elvers (incumbent)	29,066	56.63%
Democratic	Beulah Hand	22,258	43.37%
Write-in		3	0.01%
Total votes		51,327	100.00%

== District 12 ==
Senate District 12 contained all of Multnomah County and elected eight senators, five during presidential election years and three during midterm election years.

=== Position 6 ===
Incumbent Democratic senator Ross Morgan resigned in 1969 to become to Oregon Commissioner of Employment. In his place, the Multnomah County Commission appointed Poly Schedeen. She failed to win renomination, placing second behind former state senator Tom Mahoney.

District 12 position 6 Democratic primary election
Party	Candidate	Votes	%
Democratic	Tom Mahoney	27,802	32.13%
Democratic	Poly Schedeen (incumbent)	21,707	25.08%
Democratic	Bill Bradley	21,466	24.80%
Democratic	Phil H. McAlmond	15,568	17.99%
Total votes		86,543	100.00%

District 12 position 6 Republican primary election
Party	Candidate	Votes	%
Republican	Raymond D. Conkling	30,296	58.68%
Republican	Thomas W. Armstrong	21,330	41.32%
Total votes		51,626	100.00%

District 12 position 6 election
Party	Candidate	Votes	%
Democratic	Tom Mahoney	99,388	55.61%
Republican	Raymond D. Conkling	79,310	44.38%
Write-in		15	0.01%
Total votes		178,713	100.00%
Democratic hold			

=== Position 7 ===
District 12 position 7 Democratic primary election
Party	Candidate	Votes	%
Democratic	Ted Hallock (incumbent)	57,816	70.37%
Democratic	Francois Michael Marty	24,343	29.63%
Total votes		82,159	100.00%

District 12 position 7 Republican primary election
Party	Candidate	Votes	%
Republican	John W. Givens	45,876	100.00%
Total votes		45,876	100.00%

District 12 position 7 election
Party	Candidate	Votes	%
Democratic	Ted Hallock (incumbent)	118,541	68.01%
Republican	John W. Givens	55,742	31.98%
Write-in		8	0.00%
Total votes		174,291	100.00%

=== Position 8 ===
District 12 position 8 Democratic primary election
Party	Candidate	Votes	%
Democratic	John D. Burns (incumbent)	50,533	62.47%
Democratic	Richard T. Perry	30,364	37.53%
Total votes		80,897	100.00%

District 12 position 8 Republican primary election
Party	Candidate	Votes	%
Republican	H. Stockton Boyd	46,603	100.00%
Total votes		46,603	100.00%

District 12 position 8 election
Party	Candidate	Votes	%
Democratic	John D. Burns (incumbent)	110,042	65.15%
Republican	H. Stockton Boyd	58,859	34.85%
Write-in		11	0.01%
Total votes		168,912	100.00%

== District 14 ==
Senate District 14 contained all of Clatsop and Columbia counties and elected one senator.

District 14 Democratic primary election
Party	Candidate	Votes	%
Democratic	Bill Holmstrom (incumbent)	8,140	100.00%
Total votes		8,140	100.00%

District 14 Republican primary election
Party	Candidate	Votes	%
Republican	Robert G. Starr	4,936	100.00%
Total votes		4,936	100.00%

District 14 election
Party	Candidate	Votes	%
Democratic	Bill Holmstrom (incumbent)	12,593	64.43%
Republican	Robert G. Starr	6,947	35.55%
Write-in		4	0.02%
Total votes		19,544	100.00%

== See also ==
- 1970 Oregon gubernatorial election
- List of Oregon Legislative Assemblies
