= 1964 Oregon State Senate election =

- November 3, 1964

15 of 30 seats in the Oregon State Senate 16 seats needed for a majority
	Majority party	Minority party
Leader	Ben Musa (retired as leader)	Anthony Yturri
Party	Democratic	Republican
Leader's seat	18th district	16th district
Seats before	21	9
Seats won	11	4
Seats after	19	11
Popular vote	763,101	564,123
Percentage	57.49%	42.50%
- Results by party Democratic hold Republican gain Republican hold No election
Senate President before election
Ben Musa
Democratic
Elected Senate President
Harry D. Boivin
Democratic

Elections to the Oregon State Senate were held on November 3, 1964, to elect 15 candidates to the Senate to serve four-year terms. The Democratic Party won 11 seats to the Republicans' 4, resulting in a Senate composition of 19 Democrats and 11 Republicans, a net gain of one for the Democrats. Democrat Harry D. Boivin of Klamath County was elected Senate president for the 1965 session.

This election used the same reapportionment plan passed for the 1962 general election after the 1960 U.S. census.

== Summary ==
Partisan makeup following the 1962 election
Republican
Democratic
Split delegation

Partisan makeup following the 1964 election
Republican
Democratic
Split delegation

== District 4 ==
Senate District 4 contained all of Douglas County and elected one senator.

District 4 election 1 to be elected
Party	Candidate	Votes	%
Democratic	Al Flegel (incumbent)	13,294	52.64%
Republican	Roy E. Hanford	11,961	47.36%
Total votes		25,255	100.00%

== District 6 ==
Senate District 6 contained all of Josephine County and elected one senator.

District 6 election 1 to be elected
Party	Candidate	Votes	%
Democratic	Debbs Potts (incumbent)	6,881	50.80%
Republican	Gene L. Brown	6,663	49.19%
Write-in		1	0.01%
Total votes		13,545	100.00%

== District 7 ==
Senate District 7 contained all of Coos and Curry counties and elected one senator.

District 7 election 1 to be elected
Party	Candidate	Votes	%
Democratic	R. F. Chapman (incumbent)	12,753	50.66%
Republican	Sidney L. Chandler	12,420	49.34%
Total votes		25,173	100.00%

== District 9 ==
Senate District 9 contained all of Washington County and elected one senator.

District 9 election 1 to be elected
Party	Candidate	Votes	%
Republican	Victor Atiyeh	27,655	57.74%
Democratic	Thomas R. Roe	20,190	42.15%
Write-in		51	0.11%
Total votes		47,896	100.00%

== District 12 ==
Senate District 12 contained all of Multnomah County and elected eight senators, five during presidential election years and three during midterm election years.

District 12 election 5 to be elected
Party	Candidate	Votes	%
Democratic	Don S. Willner (incumbent)	131,555	11.98%
Democratic	Walter J. Pearson (incumbent)	129,360	11.78%
Democratic	Jack Bain	128,792	11.73%
Democratic	Vern Cook (incumbent)	128,458	11.70%
Democratic	Thomas R. Mahoney (incumbent)	127,039	11.57%
Republican	Bob Chappel	100,492	9.15%
Republican	Douglas R. Gerow	96,558	8.79%
Republican	Robert R. Bennett	87,993	8.01%
Republican	K. R. Landgraver	85,702	7.80%
Republican	Wallace L. Lee	82,238	7.49%
Write-in		53	0.00%
Total votes		1,098,240	100.00%
Democratic hold			

== District 13 ==
Senate District 13 contained all of Lincoln and Tillamook counties and elected one senator.

District 13 election 1 to be elected
Party	Candidate	Votes	%
Democratic	Andrew J. Naterlin (incumbent)	11,175	64.34%
Republican	Wendell M. Willis	6,192	35.65%
Write-in		1	0.01%
Total votes		17,368	100.00%

== District 15 ==
Senate District 15 contained all of Klamath County and elected one senator.

District 15 election 1 to be elected
Party	Candidate	Votes	%
Democratic	Harry D. Boivin (incumbent)	14,990	100.00%
Total votes		14,990	100.00%

== District 16 ==
Senate District 16 contained all of Baker, Grant, Harney, and Malheur counties and elected one senator.

District 16 election 1 to be elected
Party	Candidate	Votes	%
Republican	Anthony Yturri (incumbent)	14,226	71.09%
Democratic	Robert J. Steward	5,784	28.91%
Total votes		20,010	100.00%

== District 17 ==
Senate District 17 contained all of Umatilla, Union, and Wallowa counties and elected one senator.

District 17 election 1 to be elected
Party	Candidate	Votes	%
Republican	Raphael R. Raymond	13,573	50.96%
Democratic	Gene B. Conklin	13,061	49.04%
Write-in		2	0.01%
Total votes		26,636	100.00%
Republican gain from Democratic			

== District 18 ==
Senate District 18 contained all of Gilliam, Hood River, Morrow, Sherman, Wasco, and Wheeler counties and elected one senator.

District 18 election 1 to be elected
Party	Candidate	Votes	%
Democratic	Ben Musa (incumbent)	11,200	58.57%
Republican	Giles French	7,924	41.43%
Total votes		19,124	100.00%

== District 19 ==
Senate District 19 contained all of Crook, Deschutes, Jefferson, and Lake counties and elected one senator.

District 19 election 1 to be elected
Party	Candidate	Votes	%
Republican	Gordon McKay	10,526	55.12%
Democratic	C. L. Allen	8,569	44.87%
Write-in		1	0.01%
Total votes		19,096	100.00%
Republican gain from Democratic			

== See also ==
- 1964 Oregon House of Representatives election
- 1964 United States presidential election in Oregon
- List of Oregon Legislative Assemblies
