= Robert Y. Thornton =

American jurist and politician in Oregon (1910–2003)

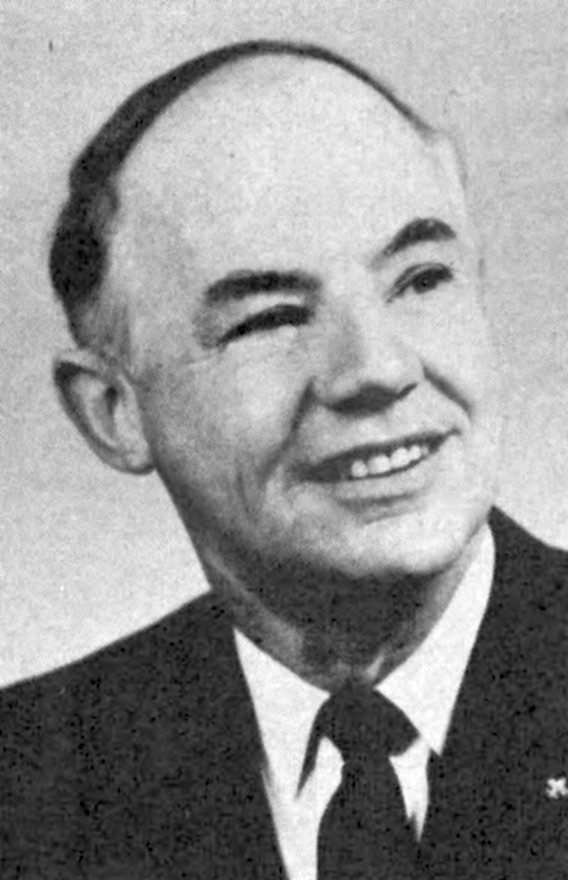

Judge on the Oregon Court of Appeals
- In office 1971–1983
- Preceded by: Edward H. Branchfield
- Succeeded by: Jonathan Uhry Newman

Oregon Attorney General
- In office January 5, 1953 – May 20, 1969
- Governor: Paul L. Patterson; Elmo Smith; Robert D. Holmes; Mark Hatfield; Tom McCall
- Preceded by: George Neuner (R)
- Succeeded by: Lee Johnson (R)

Oregon State Representative 3rd District, Tillamook
- In office 1951–1953
- Preceded by: Edward A. Geary (R)
- Succeeded by: Harry C. Elliott (R)

Personal details
- Born: January 28, 1910 Portland, Oregon
- Died: November 29, 2003 (aged 93) Salem, Oregon
- Party: Democratic
- Spouse: Dorothy Marie Haberbach
- Children: 1 son
- Occupation: Attorney, Jurist

Robert Y. Thornton (January 28, 1910 – November 29, 2003) was an American attorney, politician, and jurist in the U.S. state of Oregon. A Democrat, he was the second-longest serving Oregon Attorney General in the state's history, holding that office from 1953 to 1969. His 16-year tenure was second only to Republican Isaac Homer Van Winkle, who bested him by seven years, serving from 1920 to 1943. Thornton was the Democratic nominee for Oregon Governor in 1962, losing in the general election to incumbent Mark Hatfield.

His ultimate defeat by Republican Lee Johnson, who garnered some 80,000 more votes than Thornton in the 1968 general election, became a matter for the courts. Thornton challenged the outcome by bringing a suit charging that Johnson had violated campaign spending limits and falsified a report by signing the blank form. Johnson admitted he had done so in anticipation of being out of the country when the report was to be filed. A three-judge panel in Marion County ruled in favor of Thornton, invalidating the election results and awarding Thornton an additional term. The Oregon Supreme Court overturned that decision and awarded the office to Johnson, on the grounds that neither violation was deliberate and that both had occurred after the election.

== Education ==
- AB, Stanford University, 1932
- Postgraduate study, University of Oregon, 1933–35
- JD, George Washington University, 1937

== Career ==
- 1971-1983 - Judge, Oregon Court of Appeals
- 1953-1969 - Oregon Attorney General
- 1951-1953 - Oregon State Representative
- 1946-1953 - Private practice of law (Tillamook, Oregon)
- 1941-1946 - U.S. Army, World War II, Japan, attaining rank of Lieutenant Colonel
- 1939-1941 - Private practice of law (Tillamook)
- 1938-1939 - Assistant Solicitor, U.S. Department of the Interior
- 1937-1938 - Law Clerk, District of Columbia Court of Appeals

== Publications ==
- Thornton, Robert Y. (March–April 1956). "Organized Crime in the Field of Prostitution". Journal of Criminal Law, Criminology, and Police Science. 46 (6): 775–779. doi:10.2307/1139977. JSTOR 1139977.

Legal offices
Preceded by George Neuner	Oregon Attorney General; 1953–1969	Succeeded by Lee Johnson
Party political offices
Preceded by Robert D. Holmes	Democratic nominee for Governor of Oregon; 1962	Succeeded by Robert W. Straub
