= Wes Cooley =

Wes Cooley may refer to:

- Wes Cooley (motorcyclist) (born 1956), American motorcycle road racer
- Wes Cooley (politician) (1932–2015), American politician
