= Buckler–Henry House =

Historic building in Portland, Oregon, U.S.

- U.S. National Register of Historic Places
- Portland Historic Landmark
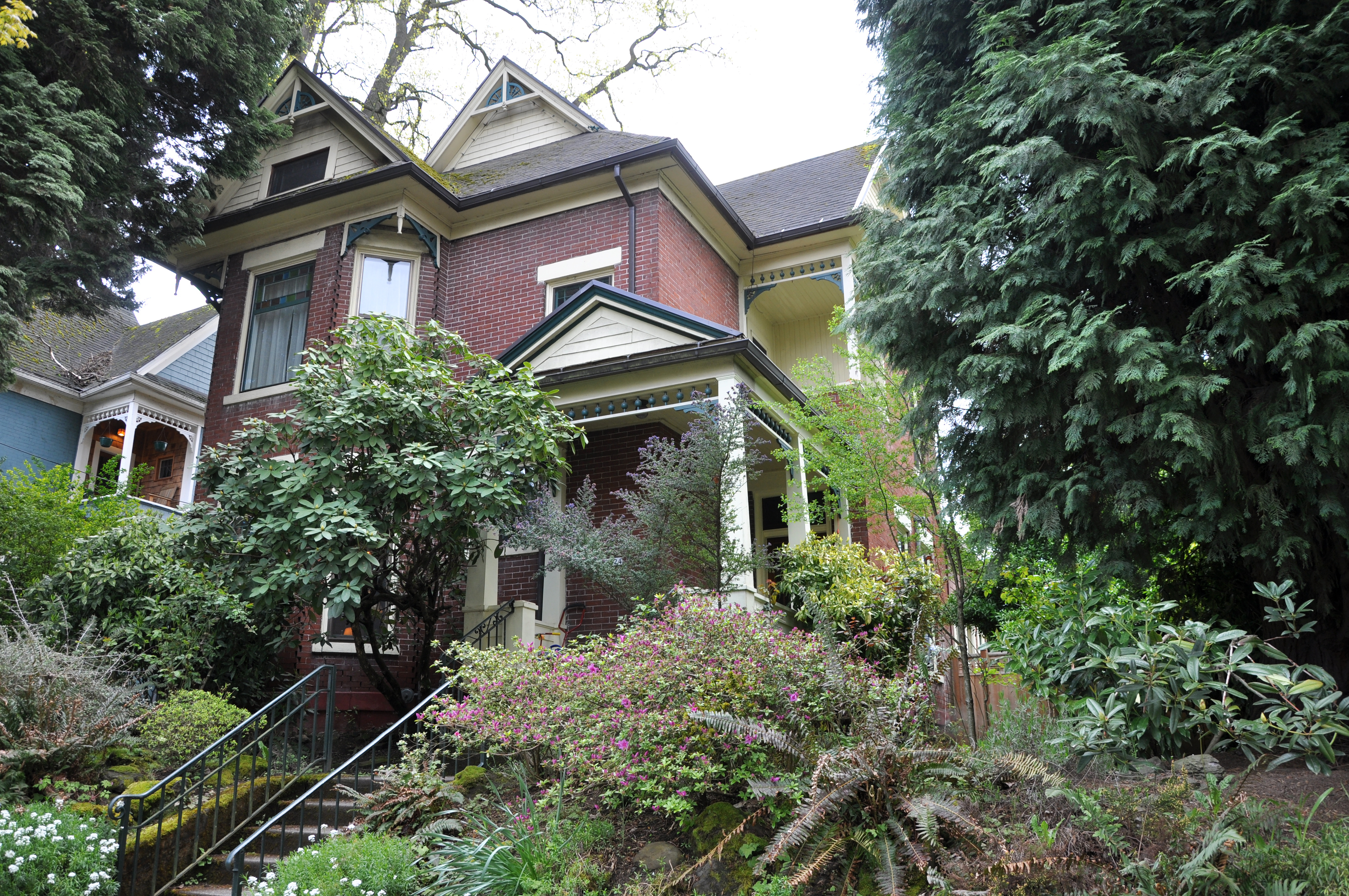
- The Buckler–Henry House in 2011
- Location: 2324 SE Ivon Street, Portland, Oregon
- Coordinates: 45°30′14″N 122°38′31″W
- Area: 0.11 acres (0.045 ha)
- Built: 1891
- Built by: John Buckler
- Architectural style: Queen Anne, Eastlake
- NRHP reference No.: 80003358
- Added to NRHP: February 12, 1980

The Buckler–Henry House, also known as the Grace Peck House, is a historic house in Portland, Oregon, United States. It is one of Portland's few remaining examples of 19th-century brick residential construction. John Buckler built the house in 1891 for Charles K. Henry, a real estate developer who platted the neighborhood in 1890, and subsequently purchased it. Prominent later residents included steamboat captain Jules Olivier and his daughter Grace Olivier Peck, who served in the Oregon House of Representatives for 22 years between 1948 and 1977. In her public life, she focused on social welfare issues and received many accolades from colleagues, governors, and the public.

The house was added to the National Register of Historic Places in 1980.

== See also ==
- National Register of Historic Places listings in Southeast Portland, Oregon
