= 1962 Oregon gubernatorial election =

- November 6, 1962
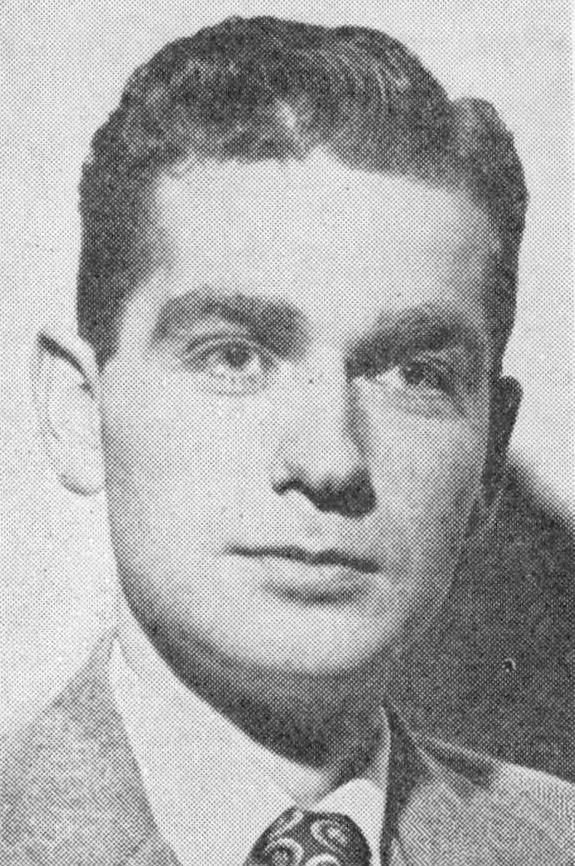

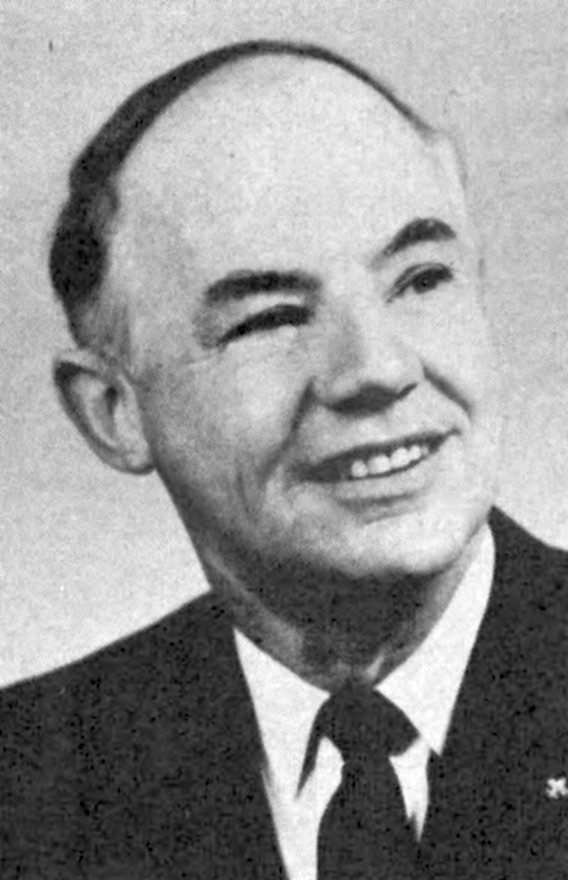
| Nominee | Mark Hatfield | Robert Y. Thornton |
| Party | Republican | Democratic |
| Popular vote | 345,497 | 265,359 |
| Percentage | 54.20% | 41.63% |
- County results Hatfield: 40–50% 50–60% 60–70% Thornton: 40–50% 50–60%
Governor before election
Mark Hatfield
Republican
Elected Governor
Mark Hatfield
Republican

The 1962 Oregon gubernatorial election took place on November 6, 1962. Republican incumbent Mark Hatfield defeated Democratic nominee Robert Y. Thornton to win re-election.

== Primary election ==
Oregon held primary elections on May 18, 1962.

=== Republican party ===
==== Candidates ====
- H. G. Altvater
- Mark Hatfield, incumbent governor

==== Results ====
Republican primary results
| Party | Candidate | Votes | % |
|---|---|---|---|
| Republican | Mark Hatfield (inc.) | 174,811 | 82.18% |
| Republican | H. G. Altvater | 37,306 | 17.54% |
| Republican | Scattering | 600 | 0.28% |
| Total votes | | 212,717 | 100.00% |

=== Democratic party ===
==== Candidates ====
- Dan N. Cox
- Walter J. Pearson, former Oregon State Treasurer
- Robert Y. Thornton, Oregon Attorney General
- M. A. Yegge

==== Results ====
Democratic primary results
| Party | Candidate | Votes | % |
|---|---|---|---|
| Democratic | Robert Y. Thornton | 149,000 | 66.16% |
| Democratic | Walter J. Pearson | 62,331 | 27.67% |
| Democratic | Dan N. Cox | 9,625 | 4.27% |
| Democratic | M. A. Yegge | 3,738 | 1.66% |
| Democratic | Scattering | 533 | 0.24% |
| Total votes | | 225,227 | 100.00% |

== General election ==
=== Candidates ===
- Mark Hatfield, Republican
- Robert Y. Thornton, Democratic
- Robert H. Wampler, Independent

=== Results ===
1962 Oregon gubernatorial election
| Party | Candidate | Votes | % | ±% |
|---|---|---|---|---|
| Republican | Mark Hatfield (inc.) | 345,497 | 54.20% | −1.11% |
| Democratic | Robert Y. Thornton | 265,359 | 41.63% | +3.03% |
| Independent | Robert H. Wampler | 26,142 | 4.10% | |
| Write-in | Scattering | 409 | 0.06% | |
| Total votes | | 637,407 | 100.00% | |
| Majority | | 80,138 | 12.57% | |
| Republican hold | | Swing | +1.91% | |

=== Results by county ===
| County | Mark Hatfield Republican | | Robert Y. Thornton Democratic | | Robert H. Wampler Independent | | Scattering Write-in | | Margin | | Total votes cast |
| County | # | % | # | % | # | % | # | % | # | % | Total votes cast |
|---|---|---|---|---|---|---|---|---|---|---|---|
| Baker | 3,025 | 54.53% | 2,357 | 42.49% | 165 | 2.97% | 0 | 0.00% | 668 | 12.04% | 5,547 |
| Benton | 8,294 | 66.34% | 3,813 | 30.50% | 395 | 3.16% | 0 | 0.00% | 4,481 | 35.84% | 12,502 |
| Clackamas | 24,428 | 52.85% | 18,371 | 39.75% | 3,403 | 7.36% | 16 | 0.03% | 6,057 | 13.11% | 46,218 |
| Clatsop | 5,953 | 55.97% | 4,329 | 40.70% | 353 | 3.32% | 2 | 0.02% | 1,624 | 15.27% | 10,637 |
| Columbia | 3,614 | 42.23% | 4,619 | 53.97% | 325 | 3.80% | 0 | 0.00% | -1,005 | -11.74% | 8,558 |
| Coos | 8,551 | 48.12% | 8,648 | 48.67% | 562 | 3.16% | 8 | 0.05% | -97 | -0.55% | 17,769 |
| Crook | 1,383 | 49.68% | 1,266 | 45.47% | 135 | 4.85% | 0 | 0.00% | 117 | 4.20% | 2,784 |
| Curry | 1,905 | 51.50% | 1,635 | 44.20% | 159 | 4.30% | 0 | 0.00% | 270 | 7.30% | 3,699 |
| Deschutes | 4,386 | 54.50% | 3,354 | 41.68% | 307 | 3.82% | 0 | 0.00% | 1,032 | 12.82% | 8,047 |
| Douglas | 10,910 | 54.68% | 8,334 | 41.77% | 710 | 3.56% | 0 | 0.00% | 2,576 | 12.91% | 19,954 |
| Gilliam | 728 | 62.38% | 397 | 34.02% | 42 | 3.60% | 0 | 0.00% | 331 | 28.36% | 1,167 |
| Grant | 1,474 | 62.40% | 798 | 33.78% | 89 | 3.77% | 1 | 0.04% | 676 | 28.62% | 2,362 |
| Harney | 1,558 | 67.01% | 707 | 30.41% | 60 | 2.58% | 0 | 0.00% | 851 | 36.60% | 2,325 |
| Hood River | 2,639 | 57.81% | 1,770 | 38.77% | 156 | 3.42% | 0 | 0.00% | 869 | 19.04% | 4,565 |
| Jackson | 15,579 | 57.60% | 10,775 | 39.84% | 671 | 2.48% | 23 | 0.09% | 4,804 | 17.76% | 27,048 |
| Jefferson | 1,238 | 57.45% | 821 | 38.10% | 95 | 4.41% | 1 | 0.05% | 417 | 19.35% | 2,155 |
| Josephine | 6,723 | 60.80% | 3,856 | 34.87% | 476 | 4.30% | 2 | 0.02% | 2,867 | 25.93% | 11,057 |
| Klamath | 6,892 | 50.35% | 5,554 | 40.58% | 1,241 | 9.07% | 0 | 0.00% | 1,338 | 9.78% | 13,687 |
| Lake | 1,353 | 62.61% | 698 | 32.30% | 110 | 5.09% | 0 | 0.00% | 655 | 30.31% | 2,161 |
| Lane | 29,888 | 51.58% | 26,294 | 45.38% | 1,721 | 2.97% | 42 | 0.07% | 3,594 | 6.20% | 57,945 |
| Lincoln | 4,332 | 50.09% | 3,817 | 44.13% | 496 | 5.73% | 4 | 0.05% | 515 | 5.95% | 8,649 |
| Linn | 9,832 | 51.32% | 8,488 | 44.30% | 802 | 4.19% | 38 | 0.20% | 1,344 | 7.01% | 19,160 |
| Malheur | 4,529 | 68.91% | 1,876 | 28.55% | 167 | 2.54% | 0 | 0.00% | 2,653 | 40.37% | 6,572 |
| Marion | 23,322 | 55.14% | 17,406 | 41.15% | 1,476 | 3.49% | 92 | 0.22% | 5,916 | 13.99% | 42,296 |
| Morrow | 1,000 | 56.69% | 702 | 39.80% | 62 | 3.51% | 0 | 0.00% | 298 | 16.89% | 1,764 |
| Multnomah | 106,089 | 52.60% | 87,361 | 43.32% | 8,079 | 4.01% | 153 | 0.08% | 18,728 | 9.29% | 201,682 |
| Polk | 5,520 | 55.73% | 4,044 | 40.83% | 339 | 3.42% | 2 | 0.02% | 1,476 | 14.90% | 9,905 |
| Sherman | 622 | 65.34% | 273 | 28.68% | 57 | 5.99% | 0 | 0.00% | 349 | 36.66% | 952 |
| Tillamook | 3,091 | 45.64% | 3,366 | 49.70% | 316 | 4.67% | 0 | 0.00% | -275 | -4.06% | 6,773 |
| Umatilla | 7,857 | 58.56% | 4,998 | 37.25% | 562 | 4.19% | 0 | 0.00% | 2,859 | 21.31% | 13,417 |
| Union | 3,431 | 54.43% | 2,649 | 42.02% | 224 | 3.55% | 0 | 0.00% | 782 | 12.40% | 6,304 |
| Wallowa | 1,394 | 59.22% | 868 | 36.87% | 92 | 3.91% | 0 | 0.00% | 526 | 22.34% | 2,354 |
| Wasco | 3,710 | 52.77% | 3,036 | 43.18% | 285 | 4.05% | 0 | 0.00% | 674 | 9.59% | 7,031 |
| Washington | 22,790 | 60.78% | 13,202 | 35.21% | 1,479 | 3.94% | 24 | 0.06% | 9,588 | 25.57% | 37,495 |
| Wheeler | 454 | 63.94% | 235 | 33.10% | 21 | 2.96% | 0 | 0.00% | 219 | 30.85% | 710 |
| Yamhill | 7,003 | 57.61% | 4,642 | 38.19% | 510 | 4.20% | 1 | 0.01% | 2,361 | 19.42% | 12,156 |
| Total | 345,497 | 54.20% | 265,359 | 41.63% | 26,142 | 4.10% | 409 | 0.06% | 80,138 | 12.57% | 637,407 |

==== Counties that flipped from Democratic to Republican ====
- Baker
- Clatsop
- Union

==== Counties that flipped from Republican to Democratic ====
- Tillamook
