= Richard Kennedy (Oregon politician) =

American politician

Member of the Oregon House of Representatives
- In office January 14, 1963 – 1973

Personal details
- Political party: Republican

Richard L. Kennedy was an American politician who served in the Oregon House of Representatives from 1963 to 1973.

== See also ==
- 56th Oregon Legislative Assembly
- 55th Oregon Legislative Assembly
- 54th Oregon Legislative Assembly
- 53rd Oregon Legislative Assembly
- 52nd Oregon Legislative Assembly
