= John W. Anunsen =

American politician

Member of the Oregon House of Representatives from the 11th district
- In office 1965–1973

Personal details
- Born: December 1931 (age 94) Salem, Oregon
- Party: Republican
- Profession: businessman

John W. Anunsen (born December 1931) was an American politician who was a member of the Oregon House of Representatives. Anunsen also worked as a businessman in the sand and gravel business.
