= Wes Cooley (politician) =

American politician and rancher

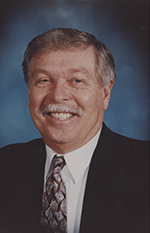

Member of the U.S. House of Representatives from Oregon's 2nd district
- In office January 3, 1995 – January 3, 1997
- Preceded by: Robert Smith
- Succeeded by: Robert Smith

Member of the Oregon Senate from the 28th district
- In office January 1993 – January 1995
- Preceded by: Wayne H. Fawbush
- Succeeded by: Greg Walden

Personal details
- Born: Wester Shadric Cooley; March 28, 1932 Los Angeles, California, U.S.
- Died: February 4, 2015 (aged 82) Bend, Oregon, U.S.
- Party: Republican
- Spouse(s): Beverly Gottfred (divorced); Rosemary Herron
- Education: University of Southern California (BS)

Wester Shadric Cooley (March 28, 1932 – February 4, 2015) was an American Republican politician and rancher from Oregon. He was a U.S. representative from Oregon's 2nd congressional district for the 1995–1997 term.

== Early life ==
Cooley was born in Los Angeles, California. He graduated from Leuzinger High School and served in the United States Army from 1952 to 1954, and is described in the Biographical Directory of the United States Congress as a rancher. He owned the vitamin supplements company Rose Laboratories. Cooley graduated from the University of Southern California with a Bachelor of Science degree in 1958.

== Political career ==
Cooley was elected to the Oregon State Senate in 1992. In 1994, midway through his State Senate term, Cooley was elected to the United States House of Representatives as a Republican from the 2nd district.

In the 104th Congress, Cooley was an advocate of private property rights, American military superiority, tort reform to limit recovery by plaintiffs, and other planks of the Republican Party's proclaimed Contract with America.

In April 1996, the Medford, Oregon Mail Tribune questioned Cooley's statement in the 1994 Voter's Guide that he had served in the Army Special Forces in Korea. Charges also arose that Cooley and his wife kept their marriage secret for several years in order for her to continue to receive veteran's benefits from her prior marriage. Cooley was unopposed for renomination in the May primary and vigorously denied the charges; however, he came under increasing pressure from fellow Republicans, including his campaign manager Greg Walden and House speaker Newt Gingrich, to step down. Walden even went as far as to announce an independent run for the seat, but implied that he would serve as a Republican if elected.

In August 1996, Cooley withdrew from the race. A special nominating convention chose former six-term incumbent Republican Bob Smith, who had retired two years earlier, to replace Cooley on the ballot. Smith went on to defeat Democrat Mike Dugan in the November election.

In December, Cooley was indicted for lying about his military service in the 1994 voter's pamphlet. While claiming that the documents proving his claim were destroyed in a fire, Cooley later accepted a plea agreement in which he was convicted of lying in an official document and sentenced to probation, community service, and ordered to pay a fine.

== Tax evasion conviction ==
On January 29, 2009, Cooley was indicted in California for his role in an alleged investment scheme associated with the sale of shares of Bidbay.com. The Oregonian reported that prosecutors alleged more than $10 million was defrauded from investors in the Bidbay sale of shares based on false statements. Cooley was charged with six counts of money laundering and one count of filing a false tax return in 2002 in an attempt to conceal more than $1.1 million in illicit income.

In December 2012, Cooley was sentenced to a year and a day in prison after pleading guilty to hiding $494,000 in income from the Internal Revenue Service. He was further ordered to pay back taxes of $138,470 and restitution of $3.5 million to the victims of the Bidbay investment fraud scheme.

== Death ==
Cooley died on February 4, 2015, in Bend, Oregon.

== See also ==
- List of American federal politicians convicted of crimes
- List of federal political scandals in the United States
- Military impostor

U.S. House of Representatives
Preceded by Robert Smith	Member of the U.S. House of Representatives from Oregon's 2nd congressional district 1995–1997	Succeeded by Robert Smith
