= Wally Priestley =

American politician

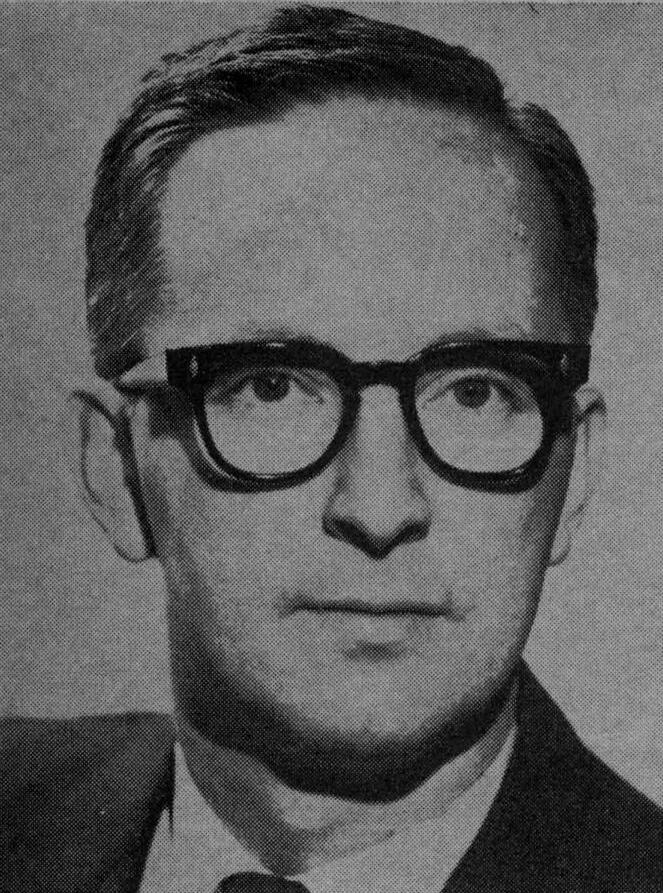
- Priestley in 1964

Member of the Oregon House of Representatives from the 6th district
- In office January 11, 1965 – May 23, 1969
- Preceded by: J. E. Bennett
- Succeeded by: Howard Cherry

Member of the Oregon House of Representatives from the 16th district
- In office January 8, 1973 – September 3, 1982
- Succeeded by: Barbara Roberts

Member of the Oregon House of Representatives from the 17th district
- In office January 10, 1983 – July 30, 1984
- Preceded by: Barbara Roberts
- Succeeded by: Mike Burton

Personal details
- Born: 1930 or 1931
- Died: September 10, 1990 (aged 59) Portland, Oregon, U.S.
- Party: Democratic
- Education: Oregon State University, Portland State University
- Profession: Politician, activist

Wally Priestley was an American politician and activist who served on the Oregon House of Representatives.

== Early life and education ==
Wally Priestley grew up in St. Johns, Portland, Oregon and graduated from Jefferson High School. He enlisted in the United States military and fought in the Korean War. After the war, he attended Oregon State University and Portland State University. He worked various jobs, including as an electronics test engineer, tugboat dispatcher, and real estate salesman, before entering politics.

== Career ==
Priestley was first elected to the Oregon House of Representatives from the 6th House district in 1964. He represented the district until losing in the 1970 election to Howard Cherry. After redistricting, Priestley was elected to the newly created 16th House district in 1972. He was assigned to the House Committee on Aging and Minority Affairs in 1980. He represented the 17th House district from 1983 to 1985. He also served on the Portland School Board from 1976 to 1981 and was a member of the Multnomah County Education Service District board from 1976 to 1980.

=== Political positions ===
Priestley was a member of the Democratic Party and the Democratic Socialists of America and has been described as a populist. Priestley was arrested multiple times throughout his life as a "devout believer in civil disobedience"; he was arrested while organizing for the United Farm Workers, protesting against the Vietnam War, blocking the United States Navy with a rubber raft, and protesting United States intervention in Central America during a visit to Portland by vice president Dan Quayle. Jack Faust described Priestly as "a walking encyclopedia of liberal causes."

He supported legislation to raise the corporate tax rate by 50%. He lobbied for the 1980 Ballot Measure 7, which required voter approval and the creation of a nuclear waste disposal facility before a nuclear power plant could be created.

== Death ==
Priestley suffered from chronic asthma. He died of an acute respiratory attack in Portland, Oregon on September 10, 1990 at the age of 59.

Priestley had placed top two in the May 1990 primary for the District 2 seat on the Multnomah County Board of Commissioners. Following his death, his name was removed from the ballots for the November 1990 runoff election.
