= Shirley Adele Field =

American politician

Shirley A. Field

Member of the Oregon House of Representatives
- In office 1956–1960; 1962–1966

Personal details
- Born: February 27, 1923 Fort Wayne, Indiana
- Died: May 11, 1995 (aged 72) Portland, Oregon
- Education: University of Michigan; Yale Law School
- Occupation: Lawyer

Shirley A. Field (1923–1995) was an Oregon legislator and judge.

== Republican party activist ==
Field was active in the Republican party and, within six years of her arrival in Oregon, was selected as an alternate delegate to the 1952 Republican National Convention. By the time of the 1960 Republican National Convention she had become a member of the executive committee of the Committee on Resolutions (platform committee) and served as the chair of its subcommittee on human affairs. That year she was the first woman subcommittee chair to be a delegate-at-large at a Republican national convention. Field gained brief national notoriety when she confronted presidential candidate Barry Goldwater over his support for right to work laws at the 1964 Republican National Convention.

== Politician ==
Field served as a Republican legislator in the Oregon House of Representatives from 1956 to 1960 and 1962 to 1966. Betty Roberts, a Democratic legislator who served with Field, described Field as "a good debater and she’s very blunt, forthright, and takes on any opposition, man or woman, very seriously." However, Field left differences behind when she was not in the political arena.

Field unsuccessfully ran for state treasurer in 1966.

== Judge ==
Field sat as a Multnomah County District Court judge from 1972 - 1978. Field, outraged that women were being prosecuted for engaging in prostitution when their male clients weren't, refused to convict women charged with the crime. Her advocacy led to a 1973 Oregon law that provided for equal legal treatment of prostitutes and their clients. The Oregon Supreme Court removed Field from the bench as the result of behavior that was later found to be caused by a massive brain tumor. She then ran unsuccessfully to reclaim the seat; and, after the diagnosis and treatment for her tumor, ran unsuccessfully for the state supreme court.

== Personal ==
Field, a native of Fort Wayne, Indiana, attended Stephens College and was an alumna of the University of Michigan and of Yale Law School. She practiced law in New York for a year before moving in 1946 to Portland, Oregon, where she lived until her death.
