= Lee Johnson (Oregon judge) =

American politician (1930–2009)

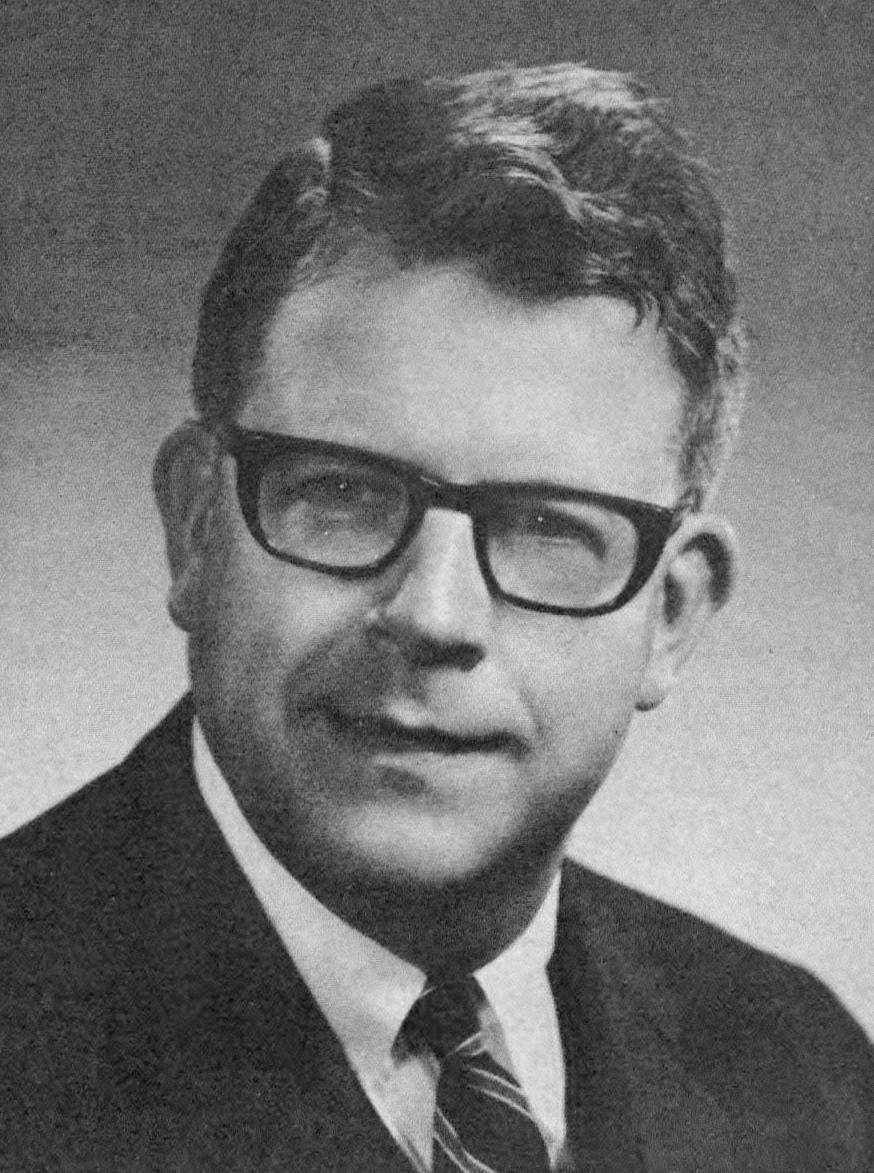

9th Oregon Attorney General
- In office May 20, 1969 – January 3, 1977
- Governor: Tom McCall; Robert W. Straub
- Preceded by: Robert Y. Thornton
- Succeeded by: James A. Redden

Judge of the Oregon Court of Appeals
- In office 1979–1980
- Preceded by: William S. Fort
- Succeeded by: J. R. Campbell

Personal details
- Born: September 8, 1930 Portland, Oregon, U.S.
- Died: November 15, 2009 (aged 79) Palm Springs, California, U.S.
- Party: Republican

Robertson Lee Johnson (September 8, 1930 – November 15, 2009) was an American attorney, Republican politician, and jurist. He served one term in the Oregon House of Representatives (1966–1968), before being elected twice as the state's Attorney General (May 20, 1969 – Jan. 3, 1977), and a partial term as Judge of the Oregon Court of Appeals (1977–78), resigning to head Governor Vic Atiyeh's executive staff. He sat as an Oregon Circuit Court Judge for Multnomah County from 1983 until his retirement in 1995.

Johnson's 1968 election as Oregon Attorney General was challenged in the courts by his opponent, incumbent Robert Y. Thornton, who accused Johnson of violating the state's Corrupt Practices Act. The election results were overturned by a Marion County court, but the Oregon Supreme Court reversed the decision. Johnson's inauguration was delayed nearly six months pending the decision, while Thornton remained in office.

Robertson retired to a ranch in Palm Springs, California, where he died of heart disease in 2009.

Legal offices
Preceded by Robert Y. Thornton	Attorney General of Oregon; 1969–1977	Succeeded by James A. Redden
