= James Bedingfield =

American lawyer and politician (1924–2022)

Member of the Oregon House of Representatives
- In office 1964–1968

Personal details
- Born: James B. Bedingfield Jr. October 24, 1924 Bandon, Oregon, U.S.
- Died: March 30, 2022 (aged 97) Greeley, Colorado, U.S.
- Education: Marshfield High School; University of Oregon; Willamette University
- Occupation: Politician, lawyer

Military service
- Allegiance: United States
- Branch/service: United States Marine Corps
- Battles/wars: World War II

James B. Bedingfield Jr. (October 24, 1924 – March 30, 2022) was an American lawyer and politician.

Bedingfield was born in Bandon, Oregon, and grew up in Coos Bay, Oregon. He graduated from Marshfield High School, in Coos Bay in 1942. Bedingfield then served in the United States Marine Corps during World War II. Bedingfield went to University of Oregon and Willamette University College of Law. He was admitted to the Oregon bar and lived with his wife and family in Coos Bay. Bedingfield served in the Oregon House of Representatives from 1964 to 1968. He died in Greeley, Colorado.
