= Cloverdale, Oregon =

- Census-designated place (CDP)
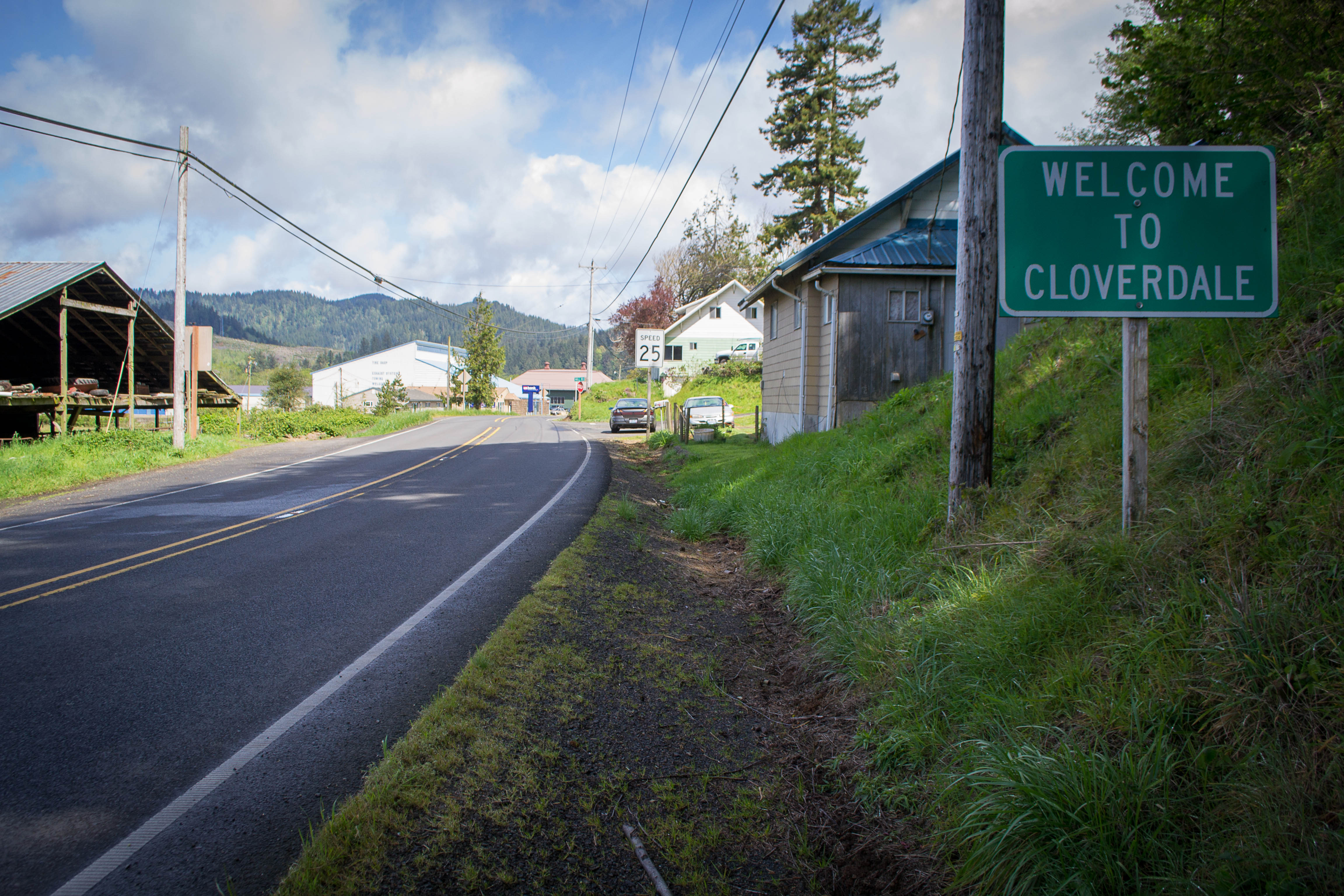

- Location of Cloverdale, Oregon
- Coordinates: 45°12′21″N 123°53′31″W
- Country: United States
- State: Oregon
- County: Tillamook

Area
  - Total: 0.80 sq mi (2.08 km^{2})
  - Land: 0.80 sq mi (2.08 km^{2})
  - Water: 0 sq mi (0.00 km^{2})
- Elevation: 23 ft (7 m)

Population (2020)
  - Total: 267
  - Density: 332.9/sq mi (128.52/km^{2})
- Time zone: UTC-8 (Pacific (PST))
  - Summer (DST): UTC-7 (PDT)
- ZIP code: 97112
- Area code: 503
- FIPS code: 41-14200
- GNIS feature ID: 1139856

Cloverdale is an unincorporated community in Tillamook County, Oregon, United States. For statistical purposes, the United States Census Bureau has defined Cloverdale as a census-designated place (CDP). The census definition of the area may not precisely correspond to local understanding of the area with the same name. As of the 2020 census, Cloverdale had a population of 267.

== History ==
Cloverdale was founded and named by Charles Ray, who settled in Tillamook County around 1884 at the site that later became the town. He later established a store, hotel, bank, and cheese factory. A post office was established in 1899.

== Geography ==
According to the United States Census Bureau, the CDP has a total area of 0.8 square miles (2.1 km^{2}), all of it land.

=== Climate ===
This region experiences cool and dry summers and mild, very wet winters. According to the Köppen Climate Classification system, Cloverdale has a warm-summer Mediterranean climate, abbreviated Csb on climate maps.

Climate data for Cloverdale 1991-2020 normals, extremes 1940-
Month	Jan	Feb	Mar	Apr	May	Jun	Jul	Aug	Sep	Oct	Nov	Dec	Year
Record high °F (°C)	69 (21)	76 (24)	80 (27)	87 (31)	90 (32)	94 (34)	95 (35)	98 (37)	98 (37)	94 (34)	80 (27)	71 (22)	98 (37)
Mean daily maximum °F (°C)	51.9 (11.1)	53.4 (11.9)	54.8 (12.7)	57.2 (14.0)	61.5 (16.4)	64.9 (18.3)	69.3 (20.7)	70.4 (21.3)	69.2 (20.7)	62.9 (17.2)	56.0 (13.3)	51.1 (10.6)	60.2 (15.7)
Mean daily minimum °F (°C)	39.8 (4.3)	39.5 (4.2)	40.4 (4.7)	41.8 (5.4)	45.8 (7.7)	49.3 (9.6)	51.7 (10.9)	51.5 (10.8)	49.5 (9.7)	45.5 (7.5)	42.0 (5.6)	39.5 (4.2)	44.7 (7.1)
Record low °F (°C)	8 (−13)	11 (−12)	25 (−4)	27 (−3)	30 (−1)	33 (1)	36 (2)	36 (2)	33 (1)	26 (−3)	17 (−8)	9 (−13)	8 (−13)
Average precipitation inches (mm)	11.36 (289)	8.74 (222)	8.84 (225)	6.84 (174)	4.26 (108)	2.99 (76)	0.76 (19)	1.12 (28)	2.98 (76)	6.91 (176)	12.24 (311)	12.65 (321)	79.69 (2,025)
Average snowfall inches (cm)	0.3 (0.76)	0.4 (1.0)	0.2 (0.51)	0.1 (0.25)	0 (0)	0 (0)	0 (0)	0 (0)	0 (0)	0 (0)	trace	0.2 (0.51)	1.2 (3.03)
Average precipitation days	18.1	15.1	18.5	16.2	11.3	8.9	3.9	4.3	7.0	12.7	17.7	18.3	152.0
Average snowy days	0.1	0.3	0.2	0.1	0	0	0	0	0	0	0.0	0.2	0.9
Source: NOAA

== Demographics ==
Historical population
Census	Pop.	Note	%±
2020	267		—
U.S. Decennial Census

As of the census of 2000, there were 242 people, 93 households, and 70 families residing in the CDP. The population density was 301.7 inhabitants per square mile (116.5/km^{2}). There were 106 housing units at an average density of 132.2 per square mile (51.0/km^{2}). The racial makeup of the CDP was 97.52% White, 0.41% African American, 1.24% Native American, and 0.83% from two or more races.

There were 93 households, out of which 26.9% had children under the age of 18 living with them, 61.3% were married couples living together, 7.5% had a female householder with no husband present, and 24.7% were non-families. 17.2% of all households were made up of individuals, and 7.5% had someone living alone who was 65 years of age or older. The average household size was 2.60 and the average family size was 2.80.

In the CDP, the population was spread out, with 21.5% under the age of 18, 7.4% from 18 to 24, 22.3% from 25 to 44, 33.9% from 45 to 64, and 14.9% who were 65 years of age or older. The median age was 44 years. For every 100 females, there were 98.4 males. For every 100 females age 18 and over, there were 93.9 males.

The median income for a household in the CDP was $50,568, and the median income for a family was $52,386. Males had a median income of $19,107 versus $18,125 for females. The per capita income for the CDP was $17,325. None of the families and 6.6% of the population were living below the poverty line, including no under eighteens and 21.4% of those over 64.

== Education ==
It is in the Nestucca Valley School District 101J

The county is in the Tillamook Bay Community College district.
