= F. F. Montgomery =

American politician (1924–2016)

Monte Montgomery
- Montgomery in 1959

Speaker of the Oregon House of Representatives
- In office 1965–1969
- Preceded by: Clarence M. Barton
- Succeeded by: Robert Freeman Smith
- Constituency: Eugene

Personal details
- Born: June 6, 1924 Oklahoma City, Oklahoma
- Died: December 9, 2016 (aged 92) Hilo, Hawaii
- Profession: politician

Finis Firman "Monte" Montgomery (June 6, 1924 – December 9, 2016) was an Oregon state politician. Serving as a member of the House from District 13, he was Speaker of the Oregon House of Representatives from 1965 to 1969. He also ran unsuccessfully for Oregon Secretary of State in 1968, losing to Clay Myers in a primary election. In 1972, Montgomery served as a delegate member of the Oregon Delegation to the 1972 Republican National Convention held in Miami, Florida. Montgomery later served as president of the Associated Oregon Loggers, but was convicted in 1986 of stealing from that organization. Montgomery died at the age of 92 in 2016.

== See also ==
- List of Oregon Legislative Assemblies
