= Don S. Willner =

American politician and lawyer (1926–2012)

Member of the Oregon Senate from the 12th district
- In office 1963–1973

Member of the Oregon House of Representatives from the Multnomah County district
- In office 1957–1959

Personal details
- Born: May 22, 1926 New York City, New York, U.S.
- Died: March 27, 2012 (aged 85) Trout Lake, Washington, U.S.
- Party: Democratic
- Education: Harvard Law School
- Occupation: Lawyer, politician

Military service
- Branch/service: United States Maritime Service; United States Army

Don S. Willner (May 22, 1926 – March 27, 2012) was an American lawyer and Democratic politician from Oregon.

== Early life and education ==
Born in New York City, Willner served in the United States Maritime Service and the United States Army before graduating from Harvard Law School in 1951. Following law school, he moved to Portland, Oregon.

== Political career ==
Willner was elected to the Oregon House of Representatives in 1956, taking office from 1957 to 1959, and subsequently served in the Oregon State Senate from 1963 to 1973.

Willner died at his home in Trout Lake, Washington, on March 27, 2012, at the age of 85.
