= Paul Hanneman =

American politician

Member of the Oregon House of Representatives from the 3rd district
- In office 1965–1990

Personal details
- Born: July 21, 1936 Portland, Oregon
- Died: May 3, 2017 (aged 80)
- Party: Republican
- Spouse: Sandra Elaine Siltanen
- Education: Portland State University
- Profession: Businessman

Paul A. Hanneman (July 21, 1936 – May 3, 2017) was an American politician who was a member of the Oregon House of Representatives.

Hanneman was born in Portland, Oregon and attended Portland State University. He was a businessman, owning and operating a resort and a sign company. He was also a sports fishery guide, boat builder, and owner of a commercial fishing vessel.

Hanneman died on May 3, 2017.
