= Edward H. Branchfield =

American judge and politician

Member of the Oregon House of Representatives
- In office 1963

Judge of the Oregon Court of Appeals
- In office 1969–1971

Personal details
- Born: October 30, 1914 Macomb, Illinois, U.S.
- Died: April 11, 2011 (aged 96)
- Occupation: Judge

Edward Branchfield (October 30, 1914 – April 11, 2011) was an American judge and politician. He served as a member of the Oregon House of Representatives.

== Life and career ==
Branchfield was born in Macomb, Illinois to Paul and Bertha. He served in the United States Army during World War II.

Branchfield served in the Oregon House of Representatives in 1963.

Branchfield served as a judge of the Oregon Court of Appeals from 1969 to 1971.

Branchfield died on April 11, 2011, at the age of 96.
