= Eugene "Debbs" Potts =

American politician

Debbs Potts

Member of the Oregon Senate
- In office 1961–1984
- Preceded by: C. D. Cameron
- Succeeded by: Bill Olson
- Constituency: Josephine County 1961-72; Josephine and Jackson counties 1973-84

President of the Oregon State Senate
- In office 1967–1970
- Preceded by: Harry D. Boivin
- Succeeded by: John D. Burns

Personal details
- Born: Eugene Debs Potts; 10 December 1909 Buzzard Roost, California
- Died: 19 December 2003 (aged 94) Merlin, Oregon
- Party: Democratic
- Profession: Saw mill owner

Eugene Debs "Debbs" Potts (10 December 1909 – 19 December 2003) was an Oregon state legislator, public administrator, and founder of Historic Pottsville. Potts operated a farm machinery business and owned several small saw mills. He served twenty-four years in the Oregon State Senate which included 196 days as acting governor. He was also the first chairman of the Oregon Lottery Commission.

== Early life ==
Potts was born on 10 December 1909 in Buzzard Roost, California (a temporary logging camp in Shasta County) while his parents were traveling to Oregon. His father named him after socialist political leader Eugene V. Debs. He attended grade school in a one-room school in Summer Lake, Oregon. He went to high school for two years in Paisley, Oregon and then moved to Klamath Falls, Oregon where he graduated from Grants Pass Union High school in 1928.

During World War II, Potts served on active duty as a Chief Petty Officer in the United States Navy and then remained in the Navy Reserve for 20 years. After the war, he moved to Grants Pass, Oregon where he ran a machinery business and later a small sawmill. Over the next several decades, Potts owned or operated sawmills in Klamath Falls, Lake of the Woods, Bonanza, Keno, Upper Klamath Lake, Jump-off-Creek, and O’Dell Lake.

== Public service ==
Potts entered local politics as a Democrat, and was elected mayor of Grants Pass in 1958. He served one two-year term as mayor prior to being elected to the Oregon State Senate in 1960. He was elected to a total of six four-year terms serving until 1984. During that time, his peers elected him Senate president twice.

While Potts was a Democrat, his conservative political views made Republican senators his natural allies on many issues. During the 1967–68 and 1969-70 legislative session, Democrats held a majority of seats in the Senate. However, Potts and several other conservative Democrats joined the Republican caucus to organize the Senate. With the help of Republicans, Potts became Senate president. In return, Republicans gained control of key senate committees, and along with Potts, directed the legislative agenda.

Until the Oregon constitution was changed in 1972, the Senate president served as acting governor whenever the governor left the state. As a result, Potts served as governor when Governor Tom McCall traveled outside Oregon. During his tenure as Senate president, Potts served as Oregon’s governor a total of 196 days.

After Oregon voters approved a state-run lottery in 1984, Governor Victor Atiyeh appointed Potts as the first chairman of the Oregon Lottery Commission. Potts served as the commission’s chairman for 19 years from 1985 until 2003, helping the lottery become the state’s second-largest source of general fund revenue. Potts died from a fall from his porch on December 19, 2003, shortly after retiring from the lottery commission.

== Legacy ==
On 2 February 2004, Oregon Governor Ted Kulongoski, former Governor Atiyeh, and former Congressman Robert Smith eulogized Potts at a special memorial service held in the senate chamber at the Oregon State Capitol in Salem, Oregon. In 2005, the Oregon legislature directed that the Oregon Lottery Commission building in Salem be official named the Debbs Potts Oregon State Lottery Commission Building. This is in addition to a bridge previously named in his honor by the Oregon Transportation Commission. Today, the E.D. "Debbs" Potts Memorial Bridge carries traffic over the Rogue River in Grants Pass.

Potts is the founder of Historic Pottsville, a replica of a small Oregon town of the early 1900s. Pottsville is a 30-acre (120,000 m^{2}) site north of Merlin, Oregon. Potts began developing Pottsville in 1959 to celebrate Oregon’s Centennial. Pottsville includes a pioneer store, post office, church, blacksmith shop, cabins, and other historical buildings. It has a large collection of Oregon political memorabilia. In addition, early twentieth century logging equipment and farm machines are on outdoor display at Pottsville. Potts continued to work on Pottsville until his death.
