= L. W. Newbry =

American politician

L. W. (Lynn) Newbry

Member of the Oregon Senate from the 5th district
- In office 1961–1975

Personal details
- Born: June 22, 1923 near Talent, Oregon, United States
- Died: June 28, 2012 (aged 89) Oregon, United States
- Party: Republican
- Education: Oregon State University; Pomona College
- Profession: businessman, fruit farmer

Lyndel "Lynn" Warren Newbry (June 22, 1923 – June 28, 2012) was an American politician who was a member of the Oregon State Senate. He served from 1961 to 1974 as a Republican. Newbry is an alumnus of Oregon State University and Pomona College. He served in World War II with the United States Army Air Forces. He was later a fruit farmer and businessman. Newbry died at the age of 89 in 2012.
