= Grace Olivier Peck =

American politician (1898–1979)

Member of the Oregon House of Representatives from the 12th district
- In office 1957–1977
- Succeeded by: Rod Monroe
- In office 1948–1950

Personal details
- Born: Grace M. Olivier; January 15, 1898 Portland, Oregon, US
- Died: November 28, 1979 (aged 81) Portland, Oregon, US
- Party: Democratic
- Spouse(s): Vernon Williams (m. 1927, divorced) Raymond Peck (m. 1936, divorced)
- Profession: Secretary; stenographer; union steward

Grace Olivier Peck (January 15, 1898 – November 28, 1979) was an American politician who was a member of the Oregon House of Representatives.

Peck was born in Portland in 1898, the daughter of Jules Olivier, a river steamboat pilot who was originally from Belgium. After her parents divorced when she was young, she was raised and attended primary schooling in Portland. After graduating from Behnke-Walker Business College in Portland, she worked as a legal stenographer, secretary, union steward and shipyard timekeeper. She was first elected to the Oregon House of Representatives in 1948, serving a single term until 1950. She was re-elected in 1957 and served until her defeat in a primary election by Rod Monroe in 1976, who highlighted her age in his campaign. During her time in the office, she was a notable advocate for improved prison conditions, the poor, and for people with disabilities.

She was married twice, first to Vernon Williams, divorcing in 1930. In 1936, she married Raymond Peck, but they also divorced in the 1940s. She was a member of the Catholic Daughters of America and Ladies of the Grand Army of the Republic. Peck died at a hospital in Portland on November 28, 1979, from a stroke; she also had a stroke two years prior that incapacitated her.
