= Bob Smith (Oregon politician) =

American politician (1931–2020)

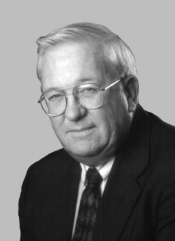

Chair of the House Agriculture Committee
- In office January 3, 1997 – January 3, 1999
- Preceded by: Pat Roberts
- Succeeded by: Larry Combest

Member of the U.S. House of Representatives from Oregon's 2nd district
- In office January 3, 1997 – January 3, 1999
- Preceded by: Wes Cooley
- Succeeded by: Greg Walden
- In office January 3, 1983 – January 3, 1995
- Preceded by: Denny Smith
- Succeeded by: Wes Cooley

Member of the Oregon Senate from the 30th district
- In office 1973–1981
- Succeeded by: Gene Timms

52nd Speaker of the Oregon House of Representatives
- In office 1969–1973
- Preceded by: F. F. Montgomery
- Succeeded by: Richard O. Eymann

Member of the Oregon House of Representatives from the 26th district
- In office 1961–1973
- Preceded by: Clinton P. Haight, Jr.
- Succeeded by: Denny Jones

Personal details
- Born: June 16, 1931 Portland, Oregon, U.S.
- Died: September 21, 2020 (aged 89) Medford, Oregon, U.S.
- Party: Republican
- Spouse: Kaye Elizabeth Tomlinson (m. 1966)
- Children: 3
- Education: Willamette University (BS)

Robert Freeman Smith (June 16, 1931 – September 21, 2020) was an American politician from Oregon. A member of the Republican Party, he served as a member of the United States House of Representatives from 1983 to 1995 and again from 1997 to 1999.

== Early life and education ==
Smith was born in Portland, Oregon, and grew up in Burns, Oregon. His father, Benjamin F. Smith, was a doctor. He attended Willamette University in Salem, Oregon, graduating in 1953 with a bachelor's degree in agriculture. He worked as a rancher until his election to the Oregon House of Representatives in 1960.

== Career ==
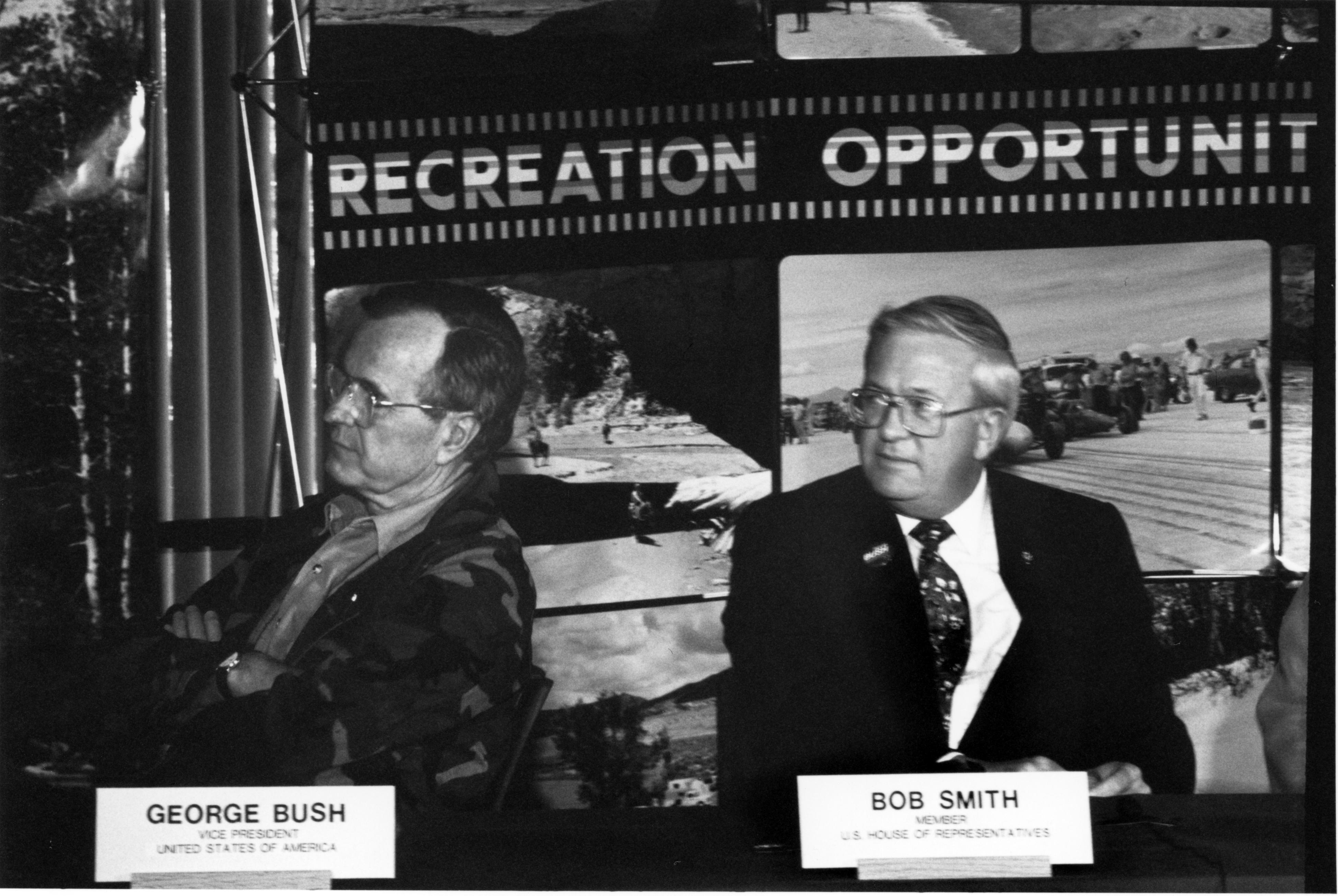
Smith with George H. W. Bush in 1988

Smith served in the state House from 1961 to 1973, serving as Speaker of the Oregon House of Representatives for the 1969 and 1971 sessions. He was in the Oregon State Senate from 1973 to 1981 and served as minority leader from 1978 to 1982. Between 1965 and 1969, Smith was the president of the Oregon Public Land Commission.

Smith was elected to Congress from Oregon's 2nd congressional district in 1982. The district's incumbent, freshman Republican Denny Smith (no relation), opted to run in the newly created 5th district after it absorbed much of the western portion of the old 2nd, including Denny Smith's home in Salem. Smith served in Congress until 1995. After a brief retirement, he returned to Congress in 1997. Wes Cooley, the Republican who had succeeded Smith in the House, had been caught in several lies about his military service and Smith was persuaded to come out of retirement. Upon his return, he was elected chairman of the United States House Committee on Agriculture, but only served one term before retiring for good.

== Personal life ==
On February 19, 1966, Smith married Kaye Elizabeth Tomlinson in Salem. Her father was the clerk of Marion County, Oregon. The wedding was attended by F. F. Montgomery, the Speaker of the Oregon House of Representatives, among others. By January 1971, Smith and his wife had two sons and a daughter.

=== Car wreck ===
On February 8, 2016, Smith struck and killed a pedestrian while driving in Medford, Oregon. The pedestrian was in the crosswalk when Smith hit him with his car, and he later died at the scene. Smith did not flee the scene, was cooperative with investigators, and was determined to not be under the influence of intoxicants at the time of the wreck. No charges or citations were filed against him regarding the wreck.

=== Death ===
Smith died on September 21, 2020, in Medford, Oregon at the age of 89.

== See also ==
- List of Oregon Legislative Assemblies

U.S. House of Representatives
Preceded by Denny Smith	Member of the U.S. House of Representatives from Oregon's 2nd congressional district 1983–1995	Succeeded by Wes Cooley
Preceded by Wes Cooley	Member of the U.S. House of Representatives from Oregon's 2nd congressional district 1997–1999	Succeeded by Greg Walden
Political offices
Preceded by Pat Roberts; Kansas	Chairman of the House Agriculture Committee; 1997–1999	Succeeded by Larry Combest; Texas
