= 1966 United States Senate election in Oregon =

- November 6, 1966
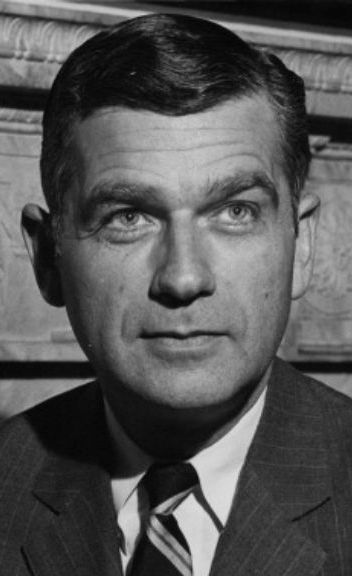

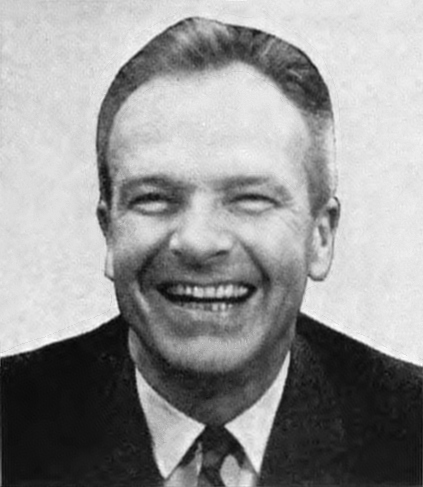
| Nominee | Mark Hatfield | Robert B. Duncan |
| Party | Republican | Democratic |
| Popular vote | 354,391 | 330,374 |
| Percentage | 51.75% | 48.25% |
- County results Hatfield: 50–60% 60–70% 70–80% Duncan: 50–60%
U.S. senator before election
Maurine Neuberger
Democratic
Elected U.S. Senator
Mark Hatfield
Republican

The 1966 Oregon United States Senate election was held on November 6, 1966, to select the U.S. Senator from the state of Oregon. Incumbent Senator Maurine Brown Neuberger did not seek re-election. Held during the escalation of United States involvement of the Vietnam War, the race was between Republican candidate and incumbent Governor of Oregon Mark Hatfield, who opposed the war, and Democratic congressman Robert B. Duncan, who supported the war. In an unusual move, Oregon's other Senator, Democrat Wayne Morse, who also opposed the war, crossed party lines to endorse Hatfield, who won in a close election, his first of five terms in the United States Senate.

== Background ==
In March 1960, first-term U.S. Senator Richard L. Neuberger died in office. Despite calls to appoint his widow, Maurine Brown Neuberger, to the position, Governor Mark Hatfield instead appointed Oregon Supreme Court justice Hall S. Lusk to fill the position until a November special election. Hatfield stated that he intended to have appointed Neuberger, but that he wanted to appoint someone who would be focused on completing the remaining eight months of the term and not running in the regular-term Senate election as Neuberger had announced she would. Some observers noted that Hatfield, a Republican, though required by state law to appoint someone of the same political party as the late Senator Neuberger, did not want to give the other party the political advantage of incumbency.

Neuberger went on to win the special election over former Oregon governor Elmo Smith, but despite the urging of Oregon congressman Robert B. Duncan, she chose not to run for a second term in 1966, citing health issues, poor relations with Oregon's senior Senator Wayne Morse, and the burden of fundraising. Duncan also urged fellow Oregon congressperson Edith Green to run for the post, but Green also declined.

== Primaries ==
=== Republican primary ===
==== Campaign ====
On the seventh anniversary of his inauguration as Oregon's 29th governor, Hatfield announced his candidacy for the Republican nomination. In his announcement, Hatfield focused on the economic achievements in the state since his election, citing record-high employment and the creation of 138,000 jobs. Hatfield was considered vulnerable on the subject of the Vietnam War, which he opposed, in contrast with 75% of Oregonians, who favored the war. Hatfield's views on the war had been strongly affected by his own experiences: as a U.S. Navy ensign in World War II, he had been among the first to walk through the devastation caused by the atomic bombing of Hiroshima; in a later assignment in Vietnam, he saw first-hand how imperialism led to incredible disparity, with countless Vietnamese living in poverty next to opulent French mansions. The war issue gave Hatfield competition from several minor candidates on the right, but Hatfield nonetheless won by a wide margin, besting his nearest competitor, conservative evangelist Walter Huss, by a nearly 6–1 margin.

==== Results ====
Results by county Hatfield: 50–60%; 60–70%; 70–80%; 80–90%

Republican primary for the United States Senate from Oregon, 1966
| Party | Candidate | Votes | % |
|---|---|---|---|
| Republican | Mark Hatfield | 174,280 | 75.18 |
| Republican | Walter Huss | 31,368 | 13.53 |
| Republican | Jim Bacaloff | 19,547 | 8.43 |
| Republican | George Altvater | 6,637 | 2.86 |
| Total votes | | 231,832 | 100.00 |

=== Democratic primary ===
==== Campaign ====
In March 1966, Duncan announced his candidacy for the Democratic nomination, which was quickly endorsed by Neuberger. In his speech announcing his candidacy, Duncan reiterated his strong support for President Lyndon B. Johnson's escalation of the Vietnam War with its goal of stopping Communist expansion in Asia. Duncan's strong announcement exposed a rift among Oregon Democrats, including Oregon's senior Senator Wayne Morse, a leading anti-war voice, and Duncan's House colleague, Edith Green. Green had urged Duncan to run, but Duncan's hawkish statement troubled her. Soon after Duncan announced his candidacy, Howard Morgan, a former member of the Federal Power Commission, announced he was running as an anti-war option to Duncan. Morgan had the support of Morse and Green (though Green's endorsement did not come until the final week of the campaign), and Duncan had the endorsement of most of the party organization and the major newspapers in the state. When the results were announced, Duncan won by a nearly 2–1 margin in one of the first elections in which the Vietnam War was a central issue.

==== Results ====
Results by county Duncan: 50–60%; 60–70%; 70–80%

Democratic primary for the United States Senate from Oregon, 1966
| Party | Candidate | Votes | % |
|---|---|---|---|
| Democratic | Robert B. Duncan | 161,189 | 62.20 |
| Democratic | Howard Morgan | 89,174 | 34.41 |
| Democratic | Gilbert L. Meyer | 8,788 | 3.39 |
| Total votes | | 259,151 | 100.00 |

== General election ==
=== Campaign ===
The general election was now set up between two participants whose views on the Vietnam War were in direct opposition to many in their party: Duncan, a pro-war Democrat and Hatfield, an anti-war Republican. With more than three-quarters of Oregonians sharing his view on the war, Duncan used the issue to attack Hatfield, stating that the outcome of the war would determine "whether Americans will die in the buffalo grass of Vietnam or the rye grass of Oregon." Duncan also stressed that his election was necessary to provide a pro-Government voice for Oregon to counteract the anti-war views of Senator Morse. Morse, who had strongly supported Duncan's rival in the primary, now went across party lines and threw his support to Hatfield, though he did not campaign for him.

Hatfield, whose popularity as Governor had made him the favorite in the race, soon found his campaign in trouble. Morse's support backfired among many Republicans; Morse had left their party in 1952 to join the Democrats a few years later, and many worried that Hatfield would follow the same path. At a June conference of governors of all 50 states, Hatfield was the lone dissenter on a resolution expressing support for the war, calling the resolution a "blank check" for President Johnson's conduct of the war. By the middle of the summer, fueled by the departure of Republican hawks (such as former Oregon State Treasurer and 1962 Senate candidate Sig Unander who wholeheartedly endorsed Duncan), and with a strong majority of voters in the state already registered as Democrats, Duncan surged to a lead in most polls.

While Hatfield did not back away from his war stance, he sought to focus his campaign on other issues, chiefly focusing on the Johnson administration's economic policies that, in Hatfield's view, had created a recession that was creating unemployment in Oregon's timber industry. As the election neared in early fall, Hatfield had pulled even with Duncan with momentum on his side. Hatfield won in 27 of Oregon's 36 counties en route to a solid but narrow 52%–48% victory. In his victory speech, Hatfield maintained that the vote was not a referendum on the war and that "neither Hanoi nor Washington should misread the results."

=== Results ===
United States Senate election in Oregon, 1966
| Party | Candidate | Votes | % |
|---|---|---|---|
| Republican | Mark Hatfield | 354,391 | 51.75% |
| Democratic | Robert B. Duncan | 330,374 | 48.25% |
| Total votes | | 684,765 | 100.00% |
| Republican gain from Democratic | | | |

== Aftermath ==
Hatfield would be re-elected to four more terms, most comfortably, before retiring from the Senate in 1996. Duncan sought revenge against Morse in the Democratic primary of the 1968 Senate election but came in second in a close three-way primary that he might have won had not a third candidate drawn off some anti-Morse votes. After Morse's loss to Bob Packwood in the 1968 general election, Duncan and Morse again squared off for the Democratic nomination in the 1972 Senate election to face Hatfield. Morse won again and lost to Hatfield in the general election. In 1974, Duncan was re-elected to the House of Representatives. He served three terms before being defeated in the Democratic primary by Ron Wyden in 1980.

== See also ==
- 1966 United States Senate elections
