= 1972 United States Senate election in Oregon =

- November 7, 1972
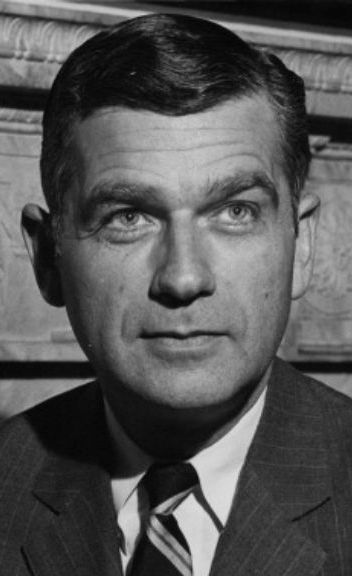

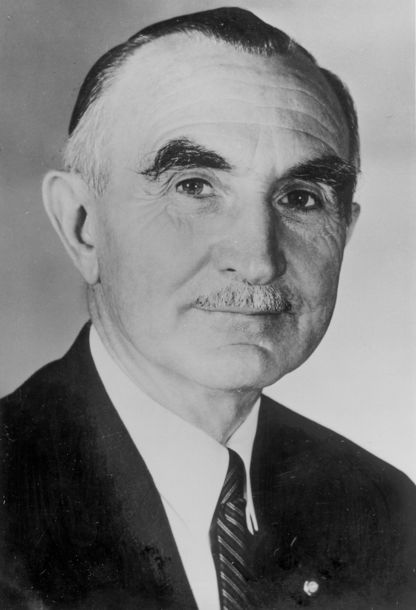
Nominee	Mark Hatfield	Wayne Morse
Party	Republican	Democratic
Popular vote	494,671	425,036
Percentage	53.72%	46.16%
- County results Hatfield: 50–60% 60–70% Morse: 50–60%
U.S. senator before election
Mark Hatfield
Republican
Elected U.S. Senator
Mark Hatfield
Republican

The 1972 United States Senate election in Oregon took place on November 7, 1972. Incumbent Republican Senator Mark Hatfield was re-elected to a second term in office, defeating Democrat Wayne Morse.

== Primary elections ==
Primary elections were held on May 23, 1972.

=== Republican primary ===
==== Candidates ====
- Kenneth A. Brown, farmer, unsuccessful candidate for Republican nomination for Oregon's 1st congressional district in 1952
- Lynn Engdahl, professor at Pacific University
- Mark Hatfield, incumbent senator
- John E. Smets, manufacturer

==== Results ====
Republican primary results
Party	Candidate	Votes	%
Republican	Mark Hatfield (incumbent)	171,594	61.16%
Republican	Lynn Engdahl	63,859	22.76%
Republican	Kenneth A. Brown	30,826	10.99%
Republican	John E. Smets	13,397	4.78%
Write-in	All others	913	0.33%
Total votes		280,589	100.00%

=== Democratic primary ===
==== Candidates ====
- Robert B. Duncan, former U.S. congressman for Oregon's 4th congressional district, Democratic nominee for U.S. Senate in 1966
- Wayne Morse, former U.S. senator
- Don S. Willner, state senator
- Ralph Wiser, businessman

==== Results ====
Results by county (Democratic primary): Wayne Morse: 50–55% 45–50% 40–45% 35–40%; Robert Duncan: 45–50% 35–40%

Democratic primary results
Party	Candidate	Votes	%
Democratic	Wayne Morse	173,147	43.70%
Democratic	Robert B. Duncan	130,845	33.03%
Democratic	Don S. Willner	74,060	18.69%
Democratic	Ralph Wiser	17,729	4.48%
Write-in	All others	423	0.11%
Total votes		396,204	100.00%

== General election ==
=== Campaign ===
According to the New York Times, the election provided "a choice between two well-known personalities, not issues". Morse, who had supported Hatfield's 1966 campaign, was famously opposed to the Vietnam War, as was Hatfield. Thus, the election was ultimately between two well-known anti-war liberals. Hatfield won a fairly comfortable 54-46 victory, winning all but three counties.

=== Results ===
1972 United States Senate election in Oregon
Party	Candidate	Votes	%	±%
Republican	Mark Hatfield (incumbent)	494,671	53.72	
Democratic	Wayne Morse	425,036	46.16	
None	Write-ins	1,126	0.12	
Majority		69,635	7.56	
Turnout		920,833		
Republican hold		Swing		

== See also ==
- 1972 United States Senate elections

== Bibliography ==
- Congressional Elections, 1946-1996. Washington, D.C.: Congressional Quarterly Inc. 1998. ISBN 1-56802-248-4.
- Scammon, Richard M., ed. (1973). America Votes 10: a handbook of contemporary American election statistics, 1972. Washington, D.C.: Governmental Affairs Institute.
