= Wayne Morse =

American politician (1900–1974)

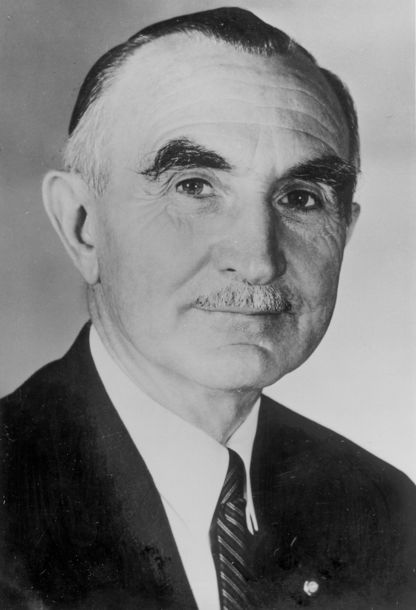

United States Senator from Oregon
- In office January 3, 1945 – January 3, 1969
- Preceded by: Rufus C. Holman
- Succeeded by: Bob Packwood

Personal details
- Born: Wayne Lyman Morse; October 20, 1900 Madison, Wisconsin, U.S.
- Died: July 22, 1974 (aged 73) Portland, Oregon, U.S.
- Party: Republican (before 1952); Independent (1952–1955); Democratic (1955–1974)
- Spouse: Midge Downie (m. 1924)
- Children: 3
- Education: University of Wisconsin, Madison (BPh, MA); University of Minnesota (LLB); Columbia University (LLM, SJD)

Military service
- Allegiance: United States
- Branch/service: United States Army
- Years of service: 1923–1929
- Rank: Second Lieutenant
- Unit: Field Artillery Branch; U.S. Army Reserve

Wayne Lyman Morse (October 20, 1900 – July 22, 1974) was an American attorney and United States Senator from Oregon. Morse is well known for opposing the Democratic Party’s leadership and for his opposition to the Vietnam War on constitutional grounds.

Born in Madison, Wisconsin, and educated at the University of Wisconsin and the University of Minnesota Law School, Morse moved to Oregon in 1930 and began teaching at the University of Oregon School of Law. During World War II, he was elected to the U.S. Senate as a Republican; he became an independent after Dwight D. Eisenhower's election to the presidency in 1952. While an independent, he set a record for performing the fourth-longest one-person filibuster in the history of the Senate. Morse joined the Democratic Party in February 1955, and was reelected twice while a member of that party.

Morse made a brief run for the Democratic Party's presidential nomination in 1960. In 1964, Morse was one of two senators to oppose the later-to-become-controversial Gulf of Tonkin Resolution. It authorized the president to take military action in Vietnam without a declaration of war. He continued to speak out against the war in the ensuing years, and lost his 1968 bid for reelection to Bob Packwood, who criticized his strong opposition to the war. Morse made two more bids for reelection to the Senate before his death in 1974.

== Early life and career ==
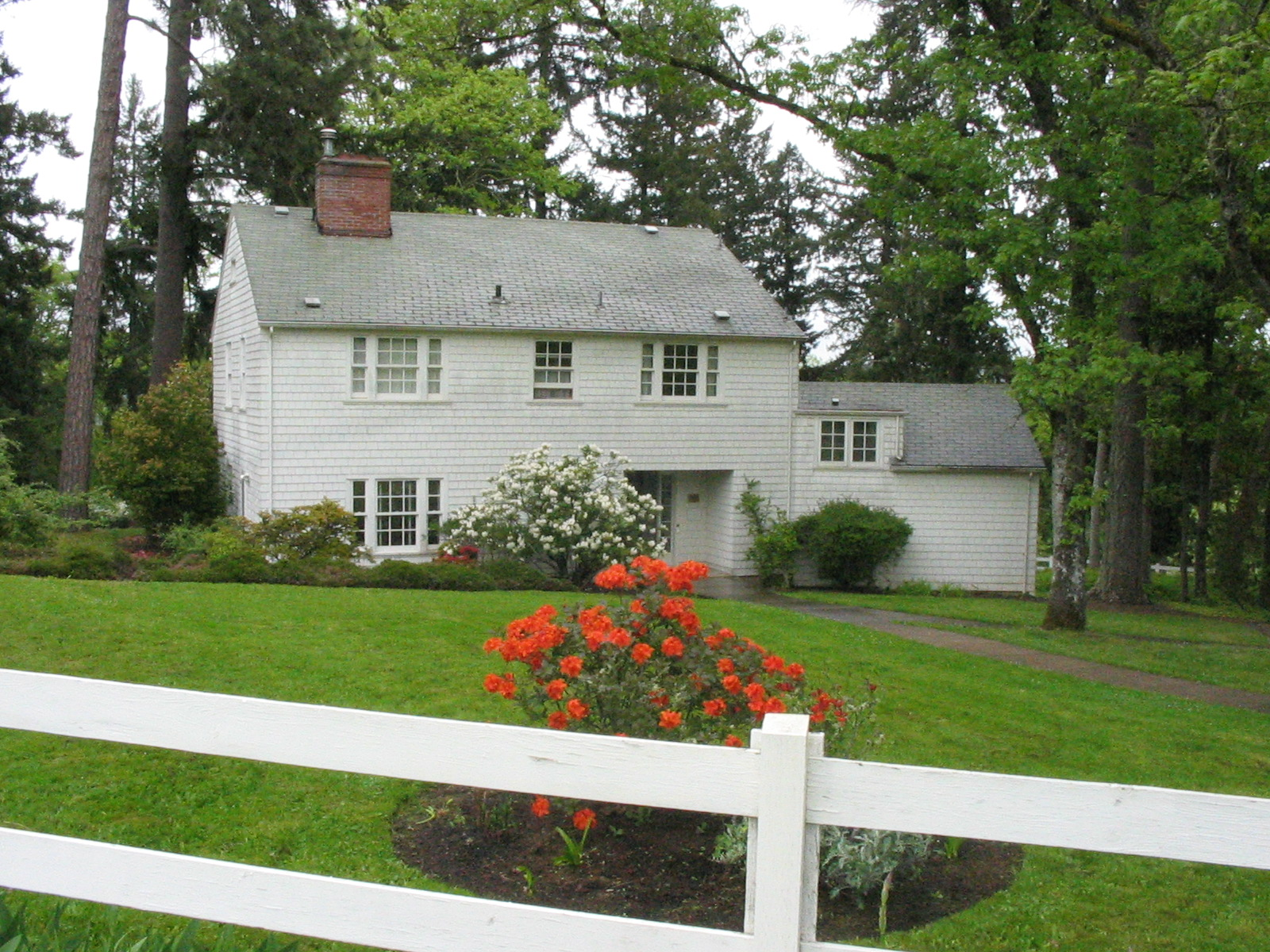
Morse's longtime home in Eugene

Morse was born on October 20, 1900, in Madison, Wisconsin, home of his maternal grandparents, Myron and Flora White. Morse's parents, Wilbur F. Morse and Jessie Elnora Morse, farmed a 320-acre (130 ha) plot near Verona, a small community 11 miles (18 km) west-southwest of Madison. Morse grew up on this farm, where the family raised Devon cattle for beef, Percheron and Hackney horses, dairy cows, hogs, sheep, poultry, and feed crops for the animals. The family eventually included five children: Mabel, seven years older than Morse; twin brothers Harry and Grant, four years older; Morse; and Caryl, fourteen years younger.

Encouraged by Jessie, the Morse family held relatively formal nightly discussions about crops, animals, education, religion, and most frequently about politics. Like many of their neighbors, the family was progressive and discussed ideas championed by Robert M. La Follette, Sr., a leader of the progressive movement who served as Wisconsin's governor from 1900 to 1906 and thereafter as a member of the U.S. Senate. During these family discussions, Morse developed debating skills and strong opinions about political corruption, corporate domination, labor rights, women's suffrage, education, and, on a personal level, hard work and sobriety.

Morse and his siblings began their education in a one-room school near Verona. However, the Morse parents, particularly Jessie, shared the Progressive belief that improvement of self and society came through good education, and they admired the schools in Madison. After Morse finished second grade, his parents enrolled him in Longfellow School in Madison, to which Morse commuted 22 miles (35 km) round-trip daily by riding relay on three of the family's smaller horses. After eighth grade, Morse attended Madison High School, where he became class president and debating club president, and placed academically among the top 10 in his graduating class. In high school, he developed his relationship with Mildred "Midge" Downie, whom he had known since third grade, and who was class valedictorian and class vice-president the same year Morse was president.

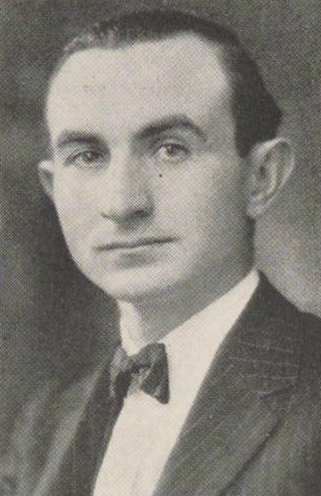
Morse in the University of Wisconsin–Madison yearbook, 1925

Morse received his Bachelor of Philosophy degree from the University of Wisconsin–Madison in 1923 and his Master of Arts degree in speech from Wisconsin the next year. He married Downie in the same year. For several years, he taught speech at the University of Minnesota Law School, and he earned his LLB degree there in 1928. He held a reserve commission as second lieutenant, Field Artillery, U.S. Army, from 1923 to 1929, and was a member of the Pi Kappa Alpha fraternity.

Morse became an assistant professor of law at the University of Oregon School of Law in 1929. Within nine months, he was promoted to associate professor and then dean of the law school. At age 31, this made him the youngest dean of any law school accredited by the American Bar Association. After becoming a full professor of law in 1931, he completed his SJD (a research doctorate in law equivalent to the PhD) at Columbia Law School in 1932. He served on many government commissions and boards, including: member, Oregon Crime Commission; administrative director, United States Attorney General's Survey of Release Procedures (1936–1939); Pacific Coast arbitrator for the United States Department of Labor (maritime industry) (1938–1942); chairman, Railway Emergency Board (1941); alternate public member of the National Defense Mediation Board (1941); and public member of the National War Labor Board (1942–1944).

== United States Senator ==
=== 1944 election and first term ===
In 1944, Morse won the Republican primary election for senator, unseating incumbent Rufus C. Holman, and then the general election that November. To secure the support of the ultra-conservative wing of the Oregon Republicans in 1944, Morse had presented himself as being more right-wing than he really was, criticizing the New Deal in vitriolic terms though he also praised the wartime foreign policy of President Franklin D. Roosevelt.

Once in Washington, D.C., he revealed his progressive roots, to the consternation of his more conservative Republican peers. Morse had intended to pull the Republican Party leftwards on the issue of union rights, a stance that put him at odds with many of the more right-wing Republicans. Morse's political heroes were other progressive Republicans such as Theodore Roosevelt and Robert La Follette, and despite being a Republican admitted that he had voted in the 1944 presidential election for Franklin D. Roosevelt against the Republican candidate Thomas E. Dewey. He was greatly influenced by the "one world" philosophy of Wendell Willkie, making it clear from the onset he was an internationalist, which caused much tension with the Republican Senate Minority Leader, Robert A. Taft who favored a quasi-isolationist foreign policy.

Morse believed that World War II had been partly caused by American isolationism and in one of his first speeches before the Senate, in February 1945, called on the United States to join the planned organization that would replace the League of Nations, namely the United Nations (UN). As a former law professor, Morse believed very strongly in international law, and in the same speech called upon the United Nations to be an "international police organization" with such powers as to enforce via military means international law against any nation that might break it and to be given the power to prevent rich nations from economically exploiting poor nations. In another speech in March 1945, he called upon the two militarily strongest members of the "Big Three" alliance, namely the Soviet Union and the United States to work together after the war to preserve the peace and end poverty all over the world. In a speech in November 1945, he declared his concern as he "watched some of the nations of the world taking a toboggan ride down the slopes of national aggrandizement and into the abyss of blind nationalism." In the same speech, he deplored the "rattling of swords and manufacturing of atomic bombs" as he called the nations of the world to stop dividing themselves into "power blocs", to take their disputes to the World Court and for the UN to have control of nuclear weapons, which he maintained were too dangerous to be entrusted to any nation.

In January 1946, after President Truman delivered an address criticizing Congress and defending his proposals, Morse referred to President Truman's speech as a "sad confession of the Democratic majority in Congress under the President's leadership" and called for the election of liberal Republicans in the midterm elections that year. Also in January 1946, Morse called on Congress to vote on President Truman's pending legislation, citing continued delay would produce "a great economic uncertainty" and add to "reconversion slow-up". He asserted that Americans were entitled to Congress being held accountable for the passage of bills. In 1946, Morse cosponsored legislation proposing a full Senate investigation into labor dispute causes, saying in March, "I think we've got to find out whether certain segments of industry are out to wreck unions." He was outspoken in his opposition to the Taft–Hartley Act of 1947, which concerned labor relations.

In April 1946, Morse in a speech denounced "blind national isolationism" and the tendency of many Americans to forget about their responsibilities to the "one-world community" in which they lived. He charged that too many Americans had a "holier than thou" attitude towards other nations and the assumption "that if any bad faith is ever practiced within the world of nations, it is always practiced by nations other than the United States." Morse concluded that America had not always practiced "simon-pure" behavior and had economically exploited poor nations. In a speech in February 1947, Morse called Wendell Willkie his principal inspiration in foreign policy, saying that "human rights cannot be nationalized or become the monopoly of any nation" and the nations of the world must work towards "a one-world philosophy of permanent peace." Morse argued that a system of international law was needed to protect the weak nations from being dominated and exploited by strong nations. Morse strongly criticized imperialism, saying neither the Netherlands or Great Britain was a suitable ally for the United States, criticizing the Dutch for attempting to reconquer their lost colony of the Dutch East Indies (modern Indonesia) and the British for staying in the Palestine Mandate (modern Israel) against the wishes of the majority of people in Palestine, both Jewish and Arab. Morse urged both the Dutch and the British to leave the Dutch East Indies and Palestine, saying they did not have the right to rule places where they were not wanted. He supported Zionism, arguing that after the Holocaust the Jews needed their own state, and urged Britain to leave Palestine so that a Jewish state to be called Israel could be created.

Though Morse had early on called for the United States to work with the Soviet Union, as the Cold War began he supported the foreign policy of President Harry S. Truman as necessary to stop Soviet expansionism. Morse voted for the Truman Doctrine, the Marshall Plan, for the National Security Act and for the United States to join the North Atlantic Treaty Organization (NATO).

In March 1948, Morse said he would support a tax reduction on the premise of world conditions worsening and Congress thereby being forced to recall the tax cut and admitted both his personal fear of large reductions and belief that Americans wanted tax cuts.

In February 1949, during a Senate Labor committee session, Morse stated the Truman administration labor bill was not going to pass in the Senate based on how it was presently written and that "a lot of compromises must be made". That year, Morse also put forward legislation that would impose national emergency strikes be handled on a case-by-case basis, the plan being turned down by the Senate on June 30 in a vote of 77 to 9. The vote was seen as a victory for supporters of the Taft–Hartley Act's provision allowing the government to get injunctions against critical strikes, though opposition was noted to have arisen from senators that did not favor this provision.

In 1950, when Truman used United Nations Security Council Resolution 84 as the legal basis for committing U.S. forces to action in the Korean War, Morse supported his decision. At the time, Morse argued that Article 2 of the American constitution gave the president "very broad powers in times of emergency and national crisis" and that the resolution from the UN Security Council was binding. At the same time, Morse also warned Truman to "not get sucked" into a war in Asia and condemned him for agreeing to support France in its efforts to hold onto Vietnam. Taft was opposed to using Resolution 84 as the basis for going to war in Korea, and in subsequently brought Morse around to his viewpoint that Truman acted illegally by not asking Congress for a declaration of war.

In November 1950, Morse stated his belief that the incoming 82nd United States Congress would attempt revamping the Taft–Hartley Act and while admitting his continued opposition to the law, acknowledged portions of the Act that he believed could be incorporated into subsequent legislation.

=== Re-election and independence from the Republican Party ===
Morse was reelected in 1950. Earlier in that year, he was one of the six Senators who supported Margaret Chase Smith's Declaration of Conscience, which criticized the tactics of McCarthyism.

Morse was kicked in the head by a horse in 1951. He sustained major injuries: the kick "tore his lips nearly off, fractured his jaw in four places, knocked out most of his upper teeth, and loosened several others."

In protest of Dwight Eisenhower's selection of Richard Nixon as his running mate, Morse left the Republican Party in 1952. Morse criticized the 1952 Republican platform with its call to repeal much of the New Deal and further felt that Eisenhower had shown cowardice by his refusal to publicly criticize Senator Joseph McCarthy, whom Morse felt was a menace to American democracy. The 1952 election produced an almost evenly divided Senate; Morse brought a folding chair when the session convened, intending to position himself in the aisle between the Democrats and Republicans to underscore his lack of party affiliation. Morse expected to retain certain committee memberships but was denied membership on the Labor Committee and others. He used a parliamentary procedure to force a vote of the entire Senate but lost his bid. New York's Senator Herbert Lehman offered Morse his seat on the Labor Committee, which Morse ultimately accepted.

As a result of Morse's becoming an independent, Republican control was reduced to a 48–47 majority. The deaths of nine senators, and the resignation of another, caused many reversals in control of the Senate during that session.

In January 1953, after Dwight D. Eisenhower nominated Charles E. Wilson as United States Secretary of Defense, Morse told reporters a possible objection to the nomination could stem from the more than 10,000 General Motors shares owned by the nominee's wife. In February, Morse stated that Eisenhower was partly to blame for a waste of both American manpower and money as it pertained to overseas military bases, reasoning that this had occurred while he was commander of NATO forces in Europe under the Democratic administration of President Truman. In July, Morse joined nine Democrats in sponsoring a bill proposing a revision of present law to add 13,000 people to Social Security and aid benefits increases. Later that month, after the death of Senate Majority Leader Robert A. Taft and questions arose of continued Republican control of the Senate, Morse confirmed his "ethical obligation" to vote with members of the party on Senate organizational issues and preserve the GOP Senate majority, citing his belief that he was acting on behalf of the American people given the Republicans gaining a majority in the 1952 elections.

In 1953, Morse conducted a filibuster for 22 hours and 26 minutes protesting the Submerged Lands Act, which at the time was the longest one-person filibuster in U.S. Senate history. In 1954, with France on the verge of defeat at the Battle of Dien Bien Phu, Eisenhower tentatively put forward a plan code-named Operation Vulture for American intervention. Morse spoke against U.S. intervention, saying "The American people are in no mood to contemplate the killing of thousands of American boys in Indochina" on the basis of "generalities". Morse also demanded that Congress be allowed to vote on Operation Vulture first, stating "if we get into another war, this country will be in it before Congress ever has time to declare war". After the French defeat, Morse accused Eisenhower of making the same mistakes as France did by assuming that a military solution was the best solution to Vietnamese revolutionary nationalism. Morse argued that the United States should work through the United Nations for a diplomatic solution of the Vietnam issue and to promote economic growth that would lift Vietnam out of its Third World poverty. He argued that such a policy would give the Soviet Union "clear notice" that the world community intended to protect the nations of Indochina their "right to self-government until such time as free elections can be held". After the Geneva Accords which ended the Indochina War, Morse accused the Secretary of State, John Foster Dulles, of having led America into "a diplomatic defeat of major significance." In September 1954, Morse voted for the United States to join the Southeast Asia Treaty Organization because it conformed to the UN Charter.

In late 1954, the First Taiwan Strait Crisis began and Morse led the fight in the Senate against what became the Formosa Resolution. Morse argued that the "predated authorization" of military force that the resolution allowed violated the constitution as he noted the constitution explicitly stated that Congress had the power to declare war, and at most the president can do is merely ask Congress to declare war if he feels the situation warrants such a step. Morse proposed three amendments to the Formosa Resolution, all of which were defeated.

Ruth Shipley headed the Passport Division of the United States Department of State from 1928 to 1955. She received criticism for denying passports for political reasons in the absence of due process rights but also got support as her actions were seen as opposing Communism. Linus Pauling, who had been awarded the Nobel Prize in Chemistry, had his 1953 passport application that would have allowed him to accept the Prize in Sweden refused by Shipley. In rejecting his application, she cited the standard language of her office, that issuance "would not be in the best interests of the United States." but that decision was overruled. Morse characterized her decisions as "tyrannical and capricious" due to her failures to disclose her actual reasons for the denial of such passport applications. Her supporters included President Truman's Secretary of State Dean Acheson and U.iS. Senator Pat McCarran of Nevada, the author of the Subversive Activities Control Act of 1950, Section 6 of which made it a crime for any member of a communist organization to use or obtain a passport. In 1964, that provision was declared unconstitutional by the United States Supreme Court.

In 1955, Democratic Majority Leader Lyndon Johnson persuaded Morse to join the Democratic caucus.

=== Joining the Democratic Party ===
After a term as an independent, during which he campaigned heavily for Democratic U.S. Senate nominee Richard Neuberger in 1954, Morse switched to the Democratic Party in February 1955. His switch meant that the Democrats won control of the Senate and had been facilitated through giving Morse his desired places on the Foreign Affairs and Banking Committees. The New York Times featured a front-page photograph of Morse on February 19, 1955, with the caption, "Democrats Welcome Morse to the Fold." The New York Times noted that Morse had made the switch and registered as a Democrat that Friday in his hometown of Eugene, Oregon.

In his book, Profiles in Courage, Sen. John F. Kennedy makes reference to Morse's time in the Republican and then later in the Democratic Party during Kennedy's tenure in the Senate.

When the Formosa resolution came to a vote in January 1955, Morse was one of the three senators who voted against the resolution. In February 1955, during his first public appearance as a Democrat, Morse stated that the vote on the Formosa resolution would have been different if senators were not under the belief that a resolution for a ceasefire was going to be introduced the following week and that Americans did not want war with the Chinese.

Despite his changes in party allegiance, for which he was branded a maverick, Morse won re-election to the United States Senate in 1956. He defeated U.S. Secretary of the Interior and former governor Douglas McKay in a hotly contested race; campaign expenditures totaled over $600,000 between the primary and general elections, a very high amount by then-contemporary standards. One of the major issues of the campaign were proposals for the Hells Canyon Dam which Morse wanted to be publicly built and run and McKay wanted to be privately run.

In March 1957 when King Saud of Saudi Arabia visited Washington and was hailed by Eisenhower as America's number one ally in the Middle East, Morse was not impressed. In a speech before the Senate, Morse stated: "Here we are, pouring by the way of gifts to that completely totalitarian state, Saudi Arabia, millions of dollars of the taxpayers' money to maintain the military forces of a dictatorship. We ought to have our heads examined!" Morse charged that Saudi Arabia's abysmal record on human rights made it an unacceptable ally.

In 1957, Morse voted against the Civil Rights Act of 1957. A longtime advocate for civil rights, Morse deemed the bill not forceful enough and therefore unworthy of support, calling it an "unconscionable compromise." He was the only Senator opposed to the bill who was not from the South.

In 1959, Morse opposed Eisenhower's appointment of Clare Boothe Luce as ambassador to Brazil. Morse, who had known Luce for many years, chastised Luce for her criticism of Franklin D. Roosevelt. Although the Senate confirmed Luce's appointment in a 79–11 vote, Luce retaliated against him. In a conversation with a reporter at a party before she departed for Brazil, Luce commented that her troubles with Senator Morse were attributable to the injuries he sustained from being kicked by a horse in 1951. She also remarked that riots in Bolivia might be dealt with by dividing the country up among its neighbors. An immediate backlash against these remarks from Morse and other senators, and Luce's refusal to retract the remark about the horse, led to her resignation just three days after her appointment.

On September 4, 1959, Morse charged Senate Majority Leader Lyndon B. Johnson with having attempted to form a dictatorship over other Senate Democrats and with failing to defend individual senators' rights.

=== Feud with Richard Neuberger ===
Toward the end of the 1950s, Morse's relationship with Richard Neuberger, the junior senator from Oregon, deteriorated and led to much public feuding. The two had known each other since 1931, when Morse was dean of the University of Oregon law school, and Neuberger was a 19-year-old freshman. Morse befriended Neuberger and often gave him advice, and he used his rhetorical skill to successfully defend Neuberger against charges of academic cheating. After the charges against him were dropped, Neuberger rejected Morse's advice to leave the university and start afresh elsewhere but instead enrolled in Morse's class in criminal law. Morse gave him a "D" in the course and, when Neuberger complained, changed the grade to an "F".

External videos
- Presentation by Mason Drukman on Wayne Morse: A Political Biography, June 5, 1997, C-SPAN

According to Mason Drukman, one of Morse's biographers, even after the two men had become senators, neither could get past what had happened in 1931. "Whatever his accomplishments," Drukman writes, "Neuberger was to Morse a man flawed in character" while Neuberger "could not forgive Morse either for propelling him out of law school ... or for having had to protect him in the honor proceedings." Morse later helped Neuberger, who won his Senate seat in 1954 by only 2,462 votes out of more than a half-million cast, but he also continued to give Neuberger advice that was not always appreciated. "I don't think you should scold me so much," said Neuberger, as quoted by Drukman, in a letter to Morse during the 1954 campaign.

By 1957, the relationship had deteriorated to the point where, rather than talking face-to-face, the senators exchanged angry letters delivered almost daily by messenger between offices in close proximity. Although the letters were private, the feud quickly became public through letters leaked to the press and comments made to colleagues and other third parties, who often had trouble deciding what the fight was about. Drukman describes the feud as a "classic struggle ... of dominating father and rebellious son locked in the age-old fight for supremacy." The feud ended only with Neuberger's death from a stroke in 1960.

=== 1960 presidential campaign ===
Editorial cartoon from The Oregonian during Morse's run for the Democratic nomination.

Morse was a late entry in the race for the Democratic nomination for president in 1960. It began unofficially at a 1959 press conference held at the state capitol in Salem by local resident Gary Neal and other Morse supporters. They declared they would put Senator Morse on the ballot by petition. As early as April 1959, Morse told a meeting of the state's Young Democrats that he had no intention of running. The group still voted to advance Senator Morse, after Congresswoman Edith Green introduced him as a favorite son.

Gary Neal was persistent and by winter of 1959 was nearing completion of his signature petition to place Morse on the May ballot. Morse soon found himself at a meeting with Neal where they discussed his efforts. Neal said to Morse, "if we [supporters] don't put your name on the ballot, your enemies will." It was clear the elephant in the room with Gary Neal and Wayne Morse was the Oregon Republican Party. Morse shot back about the Oregon Republicans, "I say to the Republican Party, trot out your governor. I'm ready to take him on."

On December 22, 1959, Wayne Morse announced his candidacy for president. He said at his announcement, "Although I would have preferred not to have entered the Oregon race, I shall not run away from a good political fight if it is inevitable." The Morse for President Oregon Headquarters was located at 353 S.W. Morrison St. Portland, Oregon 97204. The Morse entry into the presidential race did not sit well with many who had anticipated significant campaigning in Oregon from a large field of candidates. Morse was accused of flip-flopping on whether or not he would run.

Morse filed to run in May primaries in the District of Columbia, Maryland, and Oregon, in that order. He had solid connections in all three areas. Oregon was his home and where his wife and family lived. He owned a small farm in Poolesville, Maryland, and had spent fifteen years fighting for D.C. home rule, sponsoring legislation for that cause. Kennedy did not enter the D.C. primary. Senator Hubert Humphrey was Morse's main opponent in the D.C. contest, which Humphrey won 7,831 to 5,866.

Morse had known when he entered the Maryland contest that he was climbing an extremely steep hill, and had hoped to offset a potential loss there with a win in the District. John F. Kennedy was a Catholic and Maryland was the birthplace of the American Catholic church. Morse attempted to generate as much media coverage as possible. The New York Times caught wind of the Morse campaign and did their best to follow Morse around. Morse made his liberalism a key issue at every campaign stop. His remarks in Cumberland, Maryland, suggest that Kennedy was anything but a liberal:

When the Eisenhower Administration took office one of its first objectives was to riddle the tax code with favors for big business and it did so with the help of the Senator from Massachusetts. We need a candidate who will reverse the big money and big business domination of government. We need a courageous candidate who will stand up and fight the necessary political battle for the welfare of the average American. Kennedy has never been willing to do that.

As Morse had predicted, he lost to Kennedy in Maryland. Morse continued to pursue his liberalism strategy as the campaign moved to his home turf. Oregon Democrats prepared for a showdown between Morse and Kennedy, although five candidates would appear on the Oregon ballot. Humphrey, to this point Kennedy's main challenger in the primaries, had lost badly to Kennedy in West Virginia and had dropped out of the race.

The Kennedy campaign began to focus on Oregon. Its workers repeatedly denied that Morse was a serious candidate, but to make sure of a win, the campaign sent Rose Kennedy and Ted Kennedy to speak in Oregon and outspent Morse $54,000 to $9,000. Morse often found himself responding to Kennedy's claim that he was not a "serious candidate", by proclaiming: "I'm a dead serious candidate." Quietly, Oregon Democrats began to worry about what a loss for Morse would mean in 1962 against possible Republican challenger Governor Mark Hatfield. Morse would use this to his advantage to help sway undecided Democrats, claiming that if he lost in the primary, it would certainly help Republicans defeat him in 1962. Kennedy brushed off this argument by claiming that regardless of the outcome of the presidential primary, the people of Oregon had a tremendous respect for Wayne Morse and would send him back to the Senate, and that he would even come back to Oregon in 1962 to campaign for him. On Election Day, Morse came up roughly 50,000 votes short of defeating Kennedy. Morse abandoned his presidential race that same week.

Morse largely sat out the rest of the 1960 campaign. He even opted out of going to the 1960 Democratic National Convention. Instead he sat at home and watched it on television from Eugene.

=== Final Senate term ===
In a press release published in February 1961, Morse announced that he would be requesting $12 million from Congress for civil works which would mitigate the economic issues faced by Oregon. In March 1961, he criticized Charles M. Meriwether, nominated as Director of the Export-Import Bank, for his racism and anti-Semitism. He added that President John F. Kennedy owed an apology to every Jewish and Black person in the United States.

In February 1963, in his capacity as a member of the Senate Foreign Relations Committee, Morse stated that while France received the most American aid worldwide, it was not fulfilling its responsibilities to NATO. He announced that the committee would investigate whether an appropriate amount of funds were being sent, and declared that the country should be allowed to act independently of NATO if that was what President Charles de Gaulle wanted.

By 1964, Morse was the "Typhoid Mary" of the Senate, an eccentric whose humorlessness and teetotalism made him widely disliked and shunned. He rarely frequented the "Club", where important informal meetings were held in a convivial, alcohol-heavy atmosphere, and his speeches on the Senate floor usually lasted only five to ten minutes before being cut off.

==== Cuba ====
In September 1960, senators James Eastland and Thomas Dodd accused lower-ranking officials in the State Department of allowing Fidel Castro and his supporters to coup Fulgencio Batista at the end of the Cuban Revolution. Morse denied the charge and stated that he knew of no basis for the claim.

Morse was outraged by the Bay of Pigs invasion, an attempt by exiles in April 1961 to return to Cuba and overthrow Castro. Through a letter, he told Secretary of State Dean Rusk that the Kennedy administration was acting unconstitutionally, expressing "deep regret" that Congress was not informed of the invasion, and U.S. support of it, beforehand. In May, Morse announced that the Senate Latin Affairs Committee would follow up on reports that survivors were being held incommunicado at a submarine base in Vieques, Puerto Rico, noting that the internal investigation of this was primarily handled by White House staff, not State Department officials.

In January 1962, at the confirmation hearing of John A. McCone for the position of Director of Central Intelligence, Morse told McCone that the CIA needed to be brought to heel. The agency, he said, engaged in reckless actions that could easily cause a war—as nearly happened in Cuba nine months later. He also complained that none of this was being done with a formal declaration of war by Congress.

In February 1963, John F. Kennedy rejected the accusation that American air cover for the Bay of Pigs invasion was never promised. Morse replied that this was supported by the testimony of members of his administration and that as a result of subsequent developments, the document containing the testimony should be made public. He wished that the economic development group Alliance for Progress was created during the 1950s, a time with less pressure, and called it "a great mistake" to believe that its goals would be completed before 1971, the end of its ten-year mandate.

==== Objection to military involvement in the Vietnam War ====
Much of Morse's final term was occupied by his strong objection to intensifying U.S. involvement in the Vietnam War. His central contention was that the Lyndon B. Johnson administration—chiefly Defense Secretary Robert McNamara, who he believed was the spearhead—wanted to bypass Article One of the United States Constitution by sending troops and other resources without a declaration of war. In a speech on April 17, 1964, he declared that the war was "illegal and unwise", and noted that nobody had answered his claims about this. On May 20, he voted against sending $125 million in aid to South Vietnam, accusing Johnson of seeking an informal declaration of war against North Vietnam. In a memo sent to Johnson in March 1964, foreign policy adviser William Bundy predicted that Morse was the senator most likely to oppose a congressional resolution empowering Johnson to expand U.S. involvement in the war; on August 7, Morse indeed voted against the Gulf of Tonkin Resolution, being one of only two senators to do so. In a floor speech, he considered it the latest in a series of resolutions which "[embodied] a predated declaration of war."

In a speech on February 18, 1965, Morse "completely" repudiated Johnson's Vietnam policy. When Johnson, a few weeks later, announced the beginning of a bombing offensive named Operation Rolling Thunder, Morse's response was that that he "[had] not the slightest legal right" to do so without a declaration of war. On March 24, the first campus protest, a teach-in, took place at the University of Michigan. Morse praised organizer John Donoughue, telling him in a letter, "It is urgent that the American people insist that their country return to a respect for law before we create a holocaust in Asia." The next month, Morse participated in his first protest, another teach-in at the University of Oregon. He would attend many more, including a march in New York City in June, joined by Benjamin Spock and Coretta Scott King, and a June rally at Madison Square Garden where he was the lead speaker. Drukman notes that Morse "readily joined such protests when he could, and eagerly called upon others to participate."

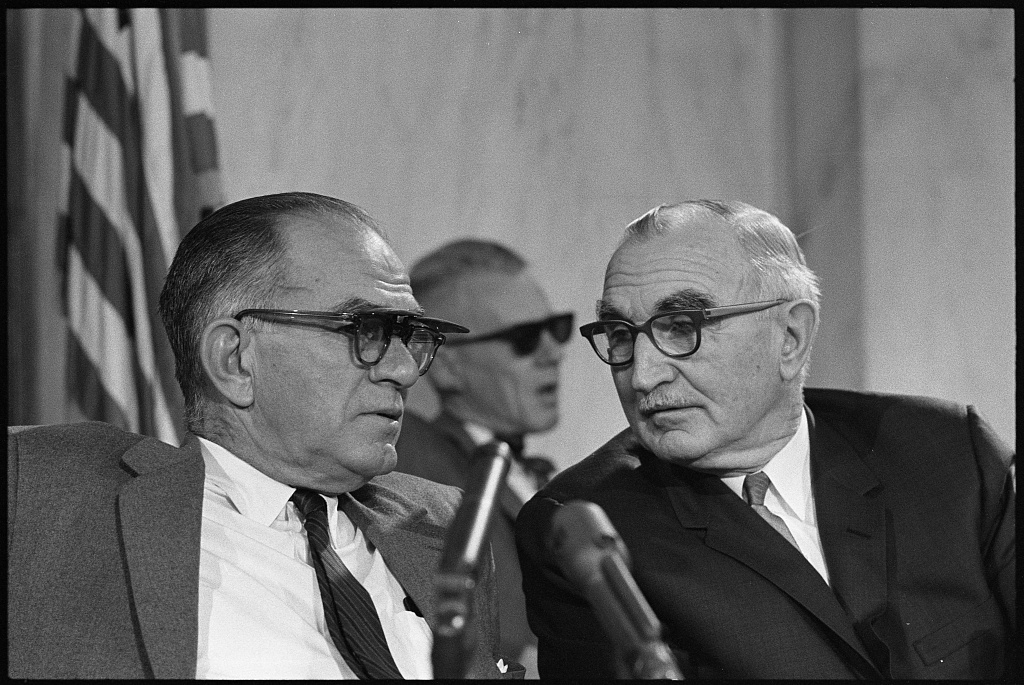
Morse (right) with Senator J. William Fulbright during a 1966 hearing of the Senate Foreign Relations Committee about the progress of the Vietnam War

In February 1966, J. William Fulbright, chairman of the Senate Foreign Relations Committee, began holding televised hearings about the war; Johnson sent General Maxwell Taylor to testify in favor of the administration. Morse told Taylor that he believed public opinion would shortly turn against the war. Taylor said North Vietnam would benefit from this, leading Morse to retort, "I know that is the smear that you militarists give to those of us who have honest differences of opinion with you, but I don't intend to get down in the gutter with you and engage in that kind of debate, General!"

Morse's activism made him enemies, and would see him lose his seat in the Senate. Allegedly at Johnson's request, he was investigated by the FBI for information which could be used against him politically. In the 1966 election for the other Senate seat from Oregon, he angered many Democrats by endorsing the Republican candidate, Governor Mark Hatfield, because Congressman Robert Duncan, the Democrat, supported the war. Two years later, he won a close primary over Duncan, and was defeated in the general election by an even slimmer margin—3,500 votes, less than 0.5% of the total cast. Bob Packwood, member of the Oregon House of Representatives, was able to achieve this by highlighting Morse's ignorance of state issues.

== Post-Senate career ==
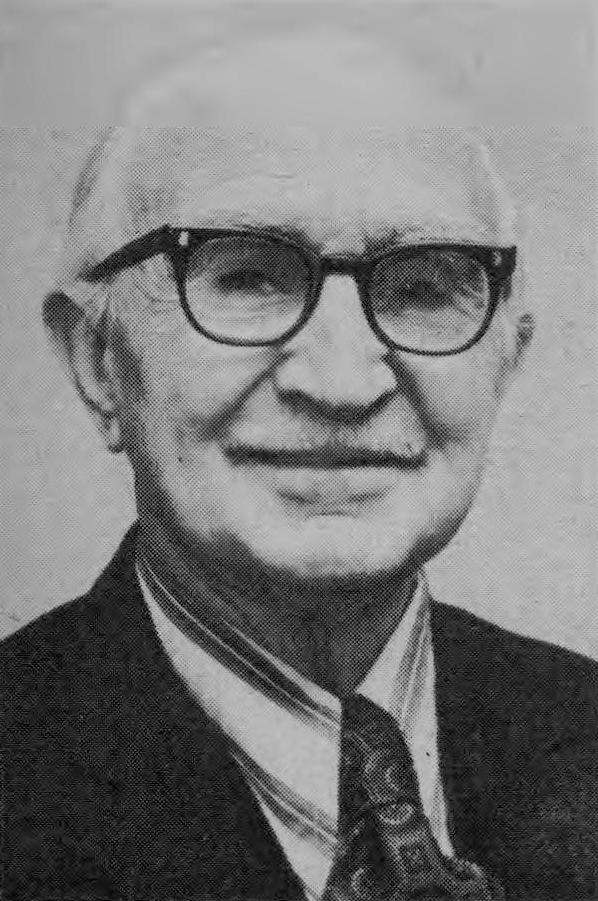
1974 campaign photograph

Not content with retirement, Morse twice attempted to return to the Senate. In 1972, he won the Democratic primary against Duncan, but lost the general election to Hatfield; Drukman believes that his opposition to the Vietnam War became a "dismissible virtue" in the intervening years. After Thomas Eagleton, Democratic nominee for Vice President, withdrew from that year's presidential election, four of thirty-four delegates from Oregon voted for Morse to succeed him instead of Sargent Shriver.

Morse's final election, in 1974, saw him campaign to unseat Packwood. He prevailed in the primary, withstanding concerns about his age, but died of kidney failure induced by a urinary tract infection on July 22. The Oregon Democratic Central Committee replaced him with state Senator Betty Roberts; she was beaten by Packwood in November.

== Legacy ==
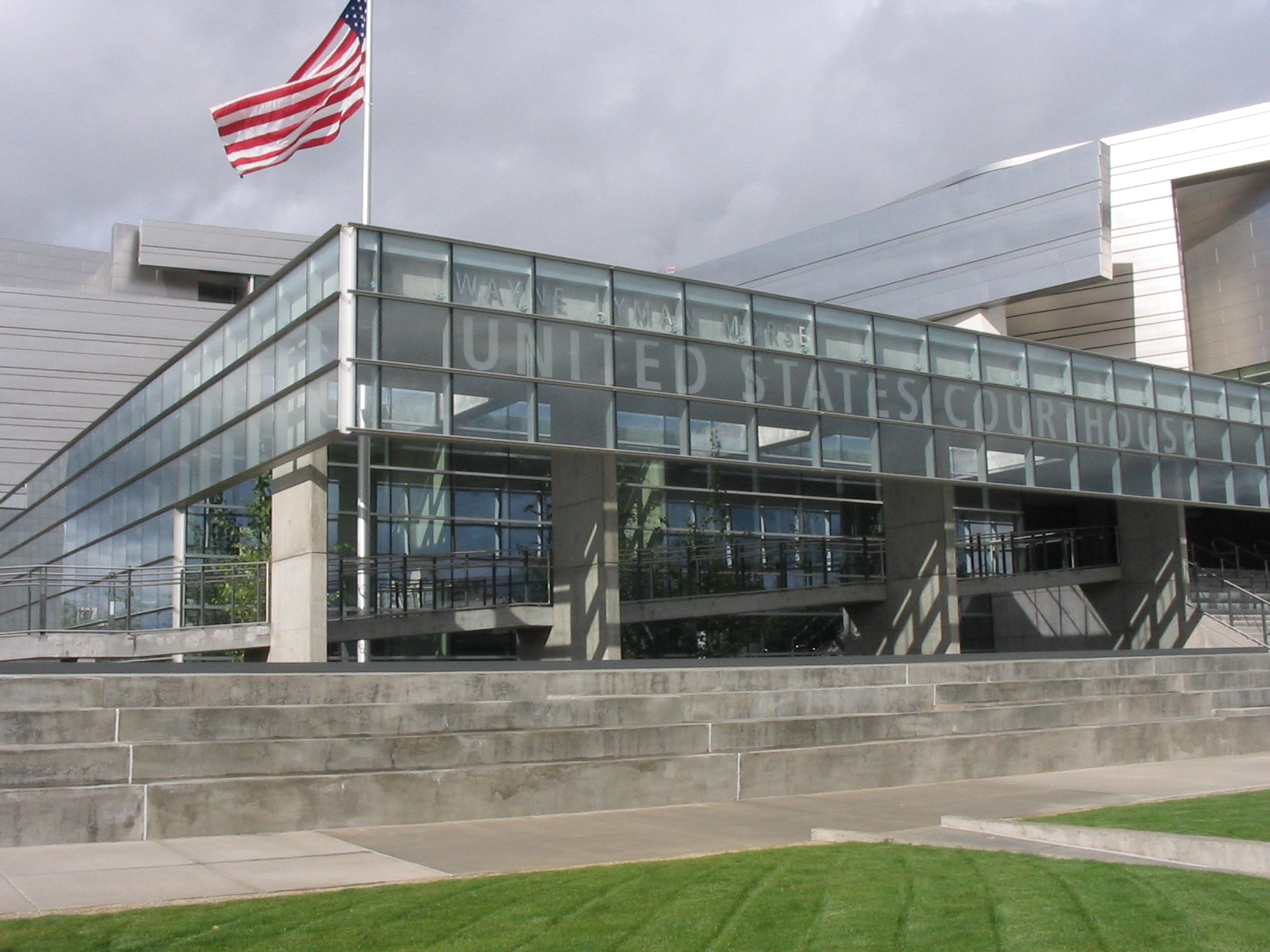
Wayne L. Morse U.S. Courthouse

The New York Times, which had praised Morse after the 1974 Senate primary, mourned the loss of "a superb public servant". Respectively, fellow Senators Hatfield and Mike Mansfield highlighted his foresight on Vietnam, and called him "a man of fierce independence".

Morse lay in state in the rotunda of the Oregon State Capitol, and a funeral was held in the chamber of the state House of Representatives. More than 600 people attended it, with Hatfield, Governor Tom McCall, state Speaker of the House Richard Eymann, primary opponent and president of the State Senate Jason Boe, and Senate colleague Eugene McCarthy giving eulogies. Among the pallbearers were Congressman Al Ullman, Congressional candidates Les AuCoin and Jim Weaver, and Duncan, aiming to gain the seat of retiring Congresswoman Edith Green.

AuCoin's failed 1992 Senate campaign was given the motto of Morse, "principle above politics". Morse's beliefs would triumph on January 30, 1996, when Ron Wyden, his driver in 1968, won a special election called after Packwood resigned.

In the 1967 book The Pacific States, Morse was deemed a quintessential example of the disinterest of politicians in the western United States in committing to a single party. He gained a lasting reputation among those involved with the Senate as the "Five-o'clock-Shadow", someone who would give long floor speeches late in the afternoon, disrupting others' plans for the evening.

Morse was honored by the University of Oregon with a position called the Wayne Morse Chair of Law and Politics; former Secretary of Labor Willard Wirtz was the first holder, in 1980. UO has also named a common space at the William W. Knight Law Center for him. The Lane County Courthouse in Eugene renovated and rededicated its adjacent Wayne L. Morse Free Speech Plaza in the spring of 2005, complete with a life-size statue and pavers imprinted with quotations, and in 2006, the Wayne L. Morse U.S. Courthouse opened in downtown Eugene.

The Morse family's 27-acre (11 ha) Eugene property and home, Edgewood Farm, is listed on the National Register of Historic Places as the Wayne Morse Farm. The City of Eugene, assisted by a nonprofit corporation, operates the historical park formerly known as Morse Ranch. The City of Eugene officially renamed the park Wayne Morse Family Farm in 2008, following a recommendation by the Wayne Morse Historical Park Corporation Board and Morse family members. The new name is more historically accurate. Wayne L. Morse is interred at Rest Haven Memorial Park in Eugene.

== Documentary films ==
- The Last Angry Man: The Story of America's Most Controversial Senator, documentary film by Christopher Houser and Robert Millis
- Clip from War Made Easy on YouTube, a 2007 documentary film

== See also ==
- List of party switchers; Republican to Independent to Democrat
- List of United States senators who switched parties

== Works cited ==
- Ceplair, Larry (2012). "The Foreign Policy of Senator Wayne L. Morse". Oregon Historical Quarterly. 113 (1) (Spring ed.): 6–35. doi:10.5403/oregonhistq.113.1.0006. S2CID 159928460.
- Drukman, Mason (1997). Wayne Morse: A Political Biography. Portland, Oregon: Oregon Historical Society Press. ISBN 9780875952635.
- Lacey, Robert (1981). The Kingdom. San Diego, California: Harcourt Brace Jovanovich. ISBN 0151472602.
- Langguth, A.J. (2000). Our Vietnam: the war 1954-1975. New York: Simon and Schuster. ISBN 0-7432-1231-2.
- Karnow, Stanley (1983). Vietnam A History. New York: Viking. ISBN 0140265473.

Party political offices
| Preceded by Rufus C. Holman | Republican nominee for U.S. Senator from Oregon (Class 3); 1944, 1950 | Succeeded by Douglas McKay |
| Preceded by Howard Latourette | Democratic nominee for U.S. Senator from Oregon (Class 3); 1956, 1962, 1968, 1974 (deceased) | Succeeded by Betty Roberts |
| Preceded by Robert B. Duncan | Democratic nominee for U.S. Senator from Oregon (Class 2); 1972 | Succeeded by Vernon Cook |
U.S. Senate
| Preceded by Rufus C. Holman | U.S. Senator (Class 3) from Oregon; 1945–1969; Served alongside: Guy Cordon, Richard L. Neuberger, Hall S. Lusk, Maurine Neuberger, Mark Hatfield | Succeeded by Bob Packwood |
