= Judge Roberts =

Judge Roberts may refer to:

- Floyd H. Roberts (1879–1967), judge of the United States District Court for the Western District of Virginia
- Jack Roberts (judge) (1910–1988), judge of the United States District Court for the Western District of Texas
- John Roberts (born 1955), judge of the United States Court of Appeals for the District of Columbia Circuit before being appointed to the United States Supreme Court
- Richard W. Roberts (born 1953), judge of the United States District Court for the District of Columbia
- Ross Thompson Roberts (1938–1987), judge of the United States District Court for the Western District of Missouri
- Thomas H. Roberts (1902–1976), judge of the United States District Court for the District of Puerto Rico
- Victoria A. Roberts (born 1951), judge of the United States District Court for the Eastern District of Michigan

== See also ==
- Judge Nathan S. Roberts House, historic home in Madison County, New York
- Justice Roberts (disambiguation)
