= Justice Roberts =

Justice Roberts is the name of:

Supreme Court of the United States

- John Roberts (born 1955), chief justice of the United States Supreme Court (2005–present)
- Owen Roberts (1875–1955), associate justice of the United States Supreme Court (1930–1945)

U.S. state supreme courts

- B. K. Roberts (1907–1999), associate justice of the Florida Supreme Court
- Betty Roberts (1923–2011), associate justice of the Oregon Supreme Court
- Clarence J. Roberts (1873–1931), associate justice of the New Mexico Supreme Court
- David G. Roberts (1928–1999), associate justice of the Maine Supreme Judicial Court
- James L. Roberts Jr. (born 1945), justice of the Supreme Court of Mississippi
- Oran Milo Roberts (1815–1898), associate justice and later chief justice of the Texas Supreme Court
- Samuel J. Roberts (1907–1987), associate justice of the Supreme Court of Pennsylvania
- Thomas H. Roberts (1902-1976), associate justice and chief justice of the Rhode Island Supreme Court (1955-1976)

Other courts

- Denys Roberts (1923–2013), last non-Chinese chief justice appointed to the Supreme Court of Hong Kong
- Jennifer Roberts (judge) (fl. 1980s–2020s), justice of the High Court of England and Wales

== See also ==
- Judge Roberts (disambiguation)
