= 1974 United States Senate election in Oregon =

- November 5, 1974
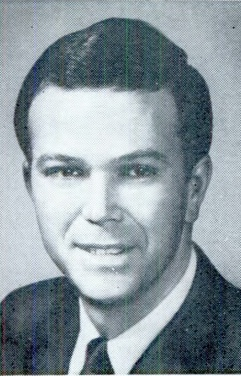

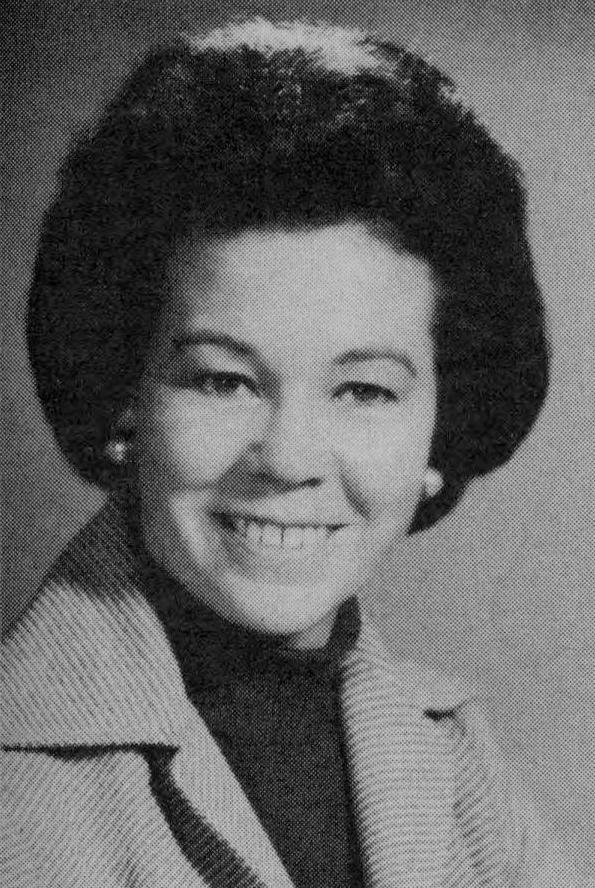
Nominee	Bob Packwood	Betty Roberts (replacing Wayne Morse)
Party	Republican	Democratic
Popular vote	420,964	338,591
Percentage	54.93%	44.18%
- County results Packwood: 50–60% 60–70% Roberts: 50–60%
U.S. senator before election
Bob Packwood
Republican
Elected U.S. Senator
Bob Packwood
Republican

The 1974 United States Senate election in Oregon was held on November 5, 1974. Incumbent Republican U.S. Senator Bob Packwood won re-election to a second term. Betty Roberts was chosen to replace former U.S. Senator Wayne Morse, who won the Democratic primary but died before the general election.

== Democratic primary ==
=== Campaign ===
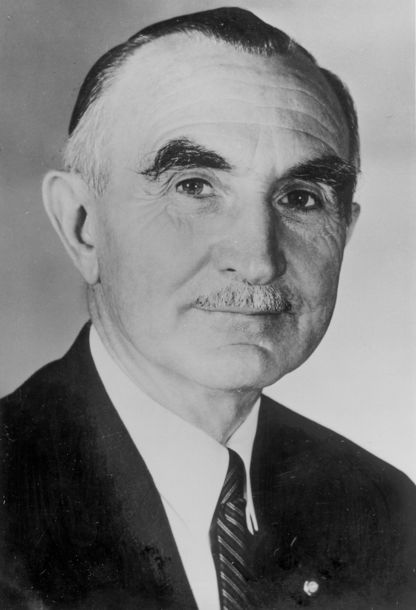
Wayne Morse won the Democratic primary, but died prior to the general election.

The Democratic primaries were held on May 28, 1974. Incumbent Senator Bob Packwood was running for re-election after his upset victory against popular incumbent Democrat Wayne Morse in 1968 made him the youngest member of the Senate.

In the Democratic primary, former Senator Morse, trying to win back the seat he had for 24 years before losing to Packwood six years earlier, faced Oregon State Senate President Jason Boe and several other candidates for a chance to take back his Senate seat. Boe, who was 45, made Morse's age, 73, an issue in the race while Morse said his experience in the Senate made him a stronger candidate. Boe called for a series of debates around the state, but Morse refused. He went on to defeat Boe 49% to 39%, and planned to use the same strategy in the general election against Packwood, whose narrow victory over Morse six years earlier was attributed to Packwood's superior performance at a debate in Portland late in the campaign.

In July, Morse was hospitalized in Portland with what was originally described as a serious urinary tract infection. His condition deteriorated and he died on July 22. The death was originally reported to have been caused by kidney failure, but it was later revealed that Morse died of leukemia; Boe apparently knew of the diagnosis during the campaign but did not make it a campaign issue.

The Oregon Democratic State Central Committee met on August 11, two days after Richard Nixon resigned the presidency. They chose State Senator Betty Roberts over Boe to replace Morse as the Democratic nominee. Roberts, an Oregon State Senator, had run for the Democratic nomination for governor that year, but lost in the May primary to eventual general election winner Robert W. Straub.

=== Results ===
Democratic primary for the United States Senate from Oregon, 1974
Party	Candidate	Votes	%
Democratic	Wayne Morse	155,729	48.98%
Democratic	Jason Boe	125,055	39.33%
Democratic	Robert T. Daly	21,881	6.88%
Democratic	Robert E. O'Connor	14,984	4.71%
Democratic	Miscellaneous	319	0.10%
Total votes		396,204	100.00%

== General election ==
=== Campaign ===
Outgoing Oregon governor Tom McCall, who had decided not to run in 1968, had pledged to Packwood a year earlier that he would not challenge him in 1974. However, as his term as governor ended, McCall began reconsidering his decision, believing he would bring more integrity to the job. In March 1974, at a dinner party held at Packwood's Washington D.C. home in McCall's honor, McCall informed Packwood that he would challenge him. The news of McCall's change of plans soon reached the media. Eventually, McCall decided that he had little chance against Packwood, who had similar positions to his own and had a reputation for ruthless campaigning that McCall did not share. McCall did not run, and Packwood was unopposed in the Republican primary.

The 1974 mid-term elections were dominated by the fallout from the Watergate scandal. Strong Democratic gains were predicted, giving Roberts a good chance at an upset. In addition, the Senate had no female members and Roberts was one of three women (along with Democrat Barbara Mikulski in Maryland and Republican Gwenyfred Bush in South Carolina) seeking a Senate seat. But on the issues, Packwood and Roberts shared many positions, such as on abortion, military spending, and the environment. Moreover, Packwood had distanced himself from Watergate, calling for Nixon's impeachment and denouncing Gerald Ford's pardon of Nixon. Roberts was also at a financial disadvantage, having entered the race late and facing debt from her failed gubernatorial run; Packwood was able to use money he had raised for a primary challenge that never materialized, and led in most polls by a double-digit margin.

Roberts lost the election to Packwood 55% to 44%. Packwood was the only Oregon Republican up for re-election to keep his seat: Democrats won every other available seat. In the governor's race, Bob Straub, who beat Roberts in the Democratic primary, defeated Vic Atiyeh to become the first Democrat elected governor since 1956; in the U. S. House of Representatives races, Les AuCoin won an open seat in the 1st district and in the 4th district, Jim Weaver upset incumbent John Dellenback.

After the election, Roberts, whose criticism of Packwood's ethics was a theme in her campaign, considered filing a lawsuit against Packwood for misrepresenting her positions on gun control, abortion, and Social Security in campaign advertisements, but later dropped the idea.

=== Results ===
United States Senate election in Oregon, 1974
Party	Candidate	Votes	%
Republican	Bob Packwood (incumbent)	420,984	54.93%
Democratic	Betty Roberts	338,591	44.18%
Write-In	Jason Boe	5,072	0.66%
Write-In	Misc.	1,767	0.23%
Total votes		766,414	100.00%
Republican hold			

== Aftermath ==
Packwood was re-elected to three more terms: in 1980, 1986, and 1992. Shortly after the 1992 election, allegations of sexual harassment revealed by The Washington Post led to his eventual resignation from the Senate in 1995.

In 1977, Roberts became the first woman to serve to the Oregon Court of Appeals, and in 1982, was appointed by Republican Governor Victor G. Atiyeh to the Oregon Supreme Court, the first woman to serve on that court.

== See also ==
- United States Senate elections, 1974 and 1975
