= Nathan Roberts =

Nathan Roberts may refer to:

- Nate Roberts (skier) (born 1982), American freestyle skier
- Nathan Roberts (volleyball) (born 1986), Australian volleyball player
- Nathan S. Roberts, namesake of the Judge Nathan S. Roberts House, Canastota, Madison County, New York
- Nathan Roberts (born 2000), American politician, identical twin brother of Nick Roberts
- Nathan Roberts, amateur engineer involved in the construction of the Erie Canal during the 19th century
- Nathan Roberts, news reporter and anchor at KCBS-TV and KCAL-TV during the 1970s
- Nathan Roberts, former drummer for The Flaming Lips
- Nathan Roberts, South African model and one of the winners of the 2002 British reality show Model Behaviour
- Nathan Roberts (Home and Away), fictional character on the Australian soap opera Home and Away

== See also ==
- Nathan Robertson (born 1977), badminton player
