= Keith Skelton =

American attorney, soldier and politician

Member of the Oregon House of Representatives
- In office 1957–1973
- Constituency: Lane County
- Constituency: Multnomah County

Personal details
- Born: Keith Dexter Skelton; May 6, 1918 Cambridge Springs, Pennsylvania
- Died: October 23, 1994 (aged 76)
- Spouse: Betty Roberts
- Education: University of Michigan

Keith Dexter Skelton (May 6, 1918 – October 23, 1994) was an American attorney, soldier and politician. He served in the Oregon Legislative Assembly and as a World War II B-17 pilot. As a pilot, he flew over fifty missions in the war against Japan. He received his BS from Edinboro University, his MS from University of Michigan and his JD from the University of Washington. He served seven terms in the Oregon House of Representatives, from 1957 to 1973, first from Lane County, then from Multnomah County. He was also an attorney, was on the faculty of two state universities, and served on the Board of Directors of Portland Community College from 1987 onward. He had been chair of Governor Tom McCall's Task Force on Transportation.

Skelton was born on a farm near Cambridge Springs, Pennsylvania.

He had two daughters, Carol and Anne, and two sons, Keith and Thomas. In 1968 he married fellow legislator and future Oregon Supreme Court judge Betty Roberts.

Skelton died on October 23, 1994.

== Writings ==
- "Legislative Interim Committees Created by Resolution," Oregon Law Review, XXXVIII (February 1959), pp. 97–121
