= Wayne Morse Family Farm =

Historic house in Oregon, United States

- Wayne Morse Farm
- U.S. National Register of Historic Places
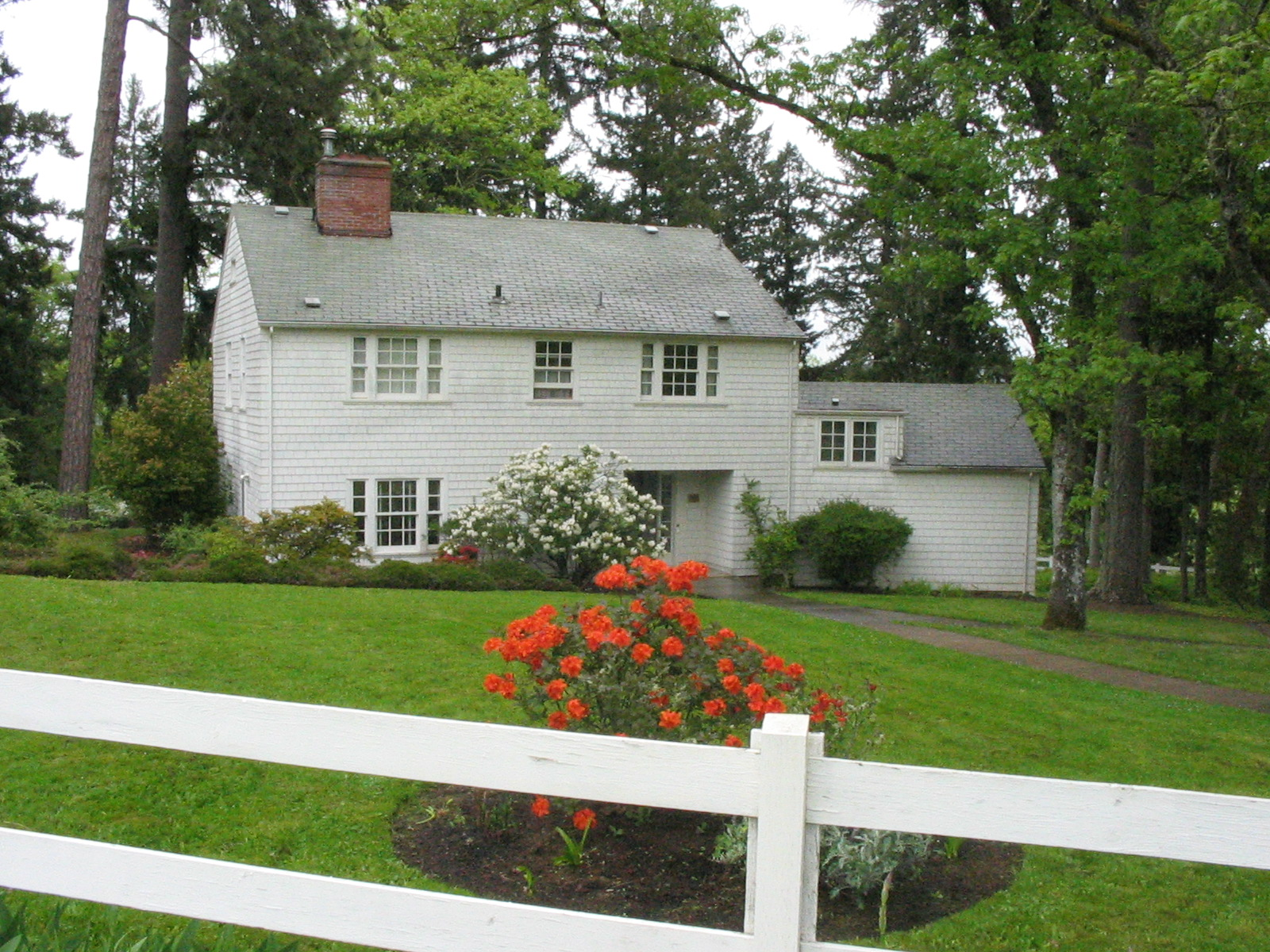
- Morse house in Eugene, Oregon
- Location: Eugene, Oregon, USA
- Coordinates: 44.02278°N 123.09861°W
- Built: 1936
- Architect: Wallace Hayden
- Architectural style: Colonial Revival
- NRHP reference No.: 99000066
- Added to NRHP: 1999

The Wayne Morse Family Farm was the home of Oregon's long-time United States Senator, Wayne Morse. The 27-acre (110,000 m^{2}) site is located in Eugene, Oregon and was originally a working farm called Edgewood Farm. Now a city park, the farm includes the Morse home, a natural wooded area, and an open meadow. Formerly known as Morse Ranch Park, the park is listed on the National Register of Historic Places as the Wayne Morse Farm.

== Wayne Morse ==
Wayne Lyman Morse was an Oregon law professor and independent-minded politician. He was born in Wisconsin and moved to Eugene in 1930, where he taught law at the University of Oregon (UO). In 1944, Morse was elected to the United States Senate as a Republican. In 1952, he left the Republican Party, becoming an Independent. Three years later, Morse joined the Democratic Party. Morse continued to serve in the Senate until 1968. He died in Portland, Oregon, in 1974.

== Morse house ==
The Morse house, a Colonial Revival style home designed by UO architecture professor Wallace S. Hayden, was built in 1936. The house is a standard wood-frame structure with shingle siding on a concrete foundation. The interior is furnished with period furniture from the 1930s and 1940s that helps preserve the historic integrity of the home. Morse memorabilia is also on display in the house. This includes a small collection of copies of political cartoons featuring Wayne Morse, which were donated to him by the artists. The original collection is maintained by the Oregon Historical Society in Portland. Because of its importance to the political history of Oregon, the Morse house and surrounding park were listed on the National Register of Historic Places in 1999. It was also nominated because the house an outstanding example of Wallace Hayden's work.

The Wayne Morse Historical Board does not currently provide tours of the Morse family home; however, tours are available at the annual Wayne Morse Farm Open House on the third Sunday in May. The Wayne Morse Historical Park Corporation works with the City of Eugene to preserve the Morse house and park. Members of the group organize events and maintain the Morse collection exhibits.

== History ==
Senator Morse and his wife Mildred made their first tour of the south hills of Eugene in 1929. The area known as the College Crest foothills had been previously logged, and the site of the future farm was covered in blackberries and poison oak. University colleagues thought it would not be a good investment to buy such an overgrown property. But the couple liked the place because of its "country feeling" and how it reminded them of their rural Wisconsin home. Having lost all the money they had saved since they married in 1924 in the 1929 stock market crash, however, the Morses had to postpone purchasing the property. Another reason for the delay is that the city had not laid water lines to the area. After saving carefully, the Morses were able to purchase the first 20-acre parcel of the farm in 1936. After building a fence around the property, Morse purchased 100 Angora goats to eat the brush; he then sold them at a profit. Later that year, water lines were being completed in the area and the Morse commissioned Wallace S. Hayden to design their new home. The house was completed in September 1936. In 1939, the Morses purchased two tracts that brought the farm to its current size of 26.55 acres. Their home was named Edgewood Farm after Morse's prize stallion Edgewood Willamette Bourbon.

When Wayne Morse died in 1974, Mildred Morse returned to the couple's other home in Washington, D.C. Management of the property was taken over by the non-profit Wayne Morse Historical Park Corporation. Mildred didn't wish to see the land developed and wanted to create a permanent memorial to Senator Morse. Saying that she would "sell it at a lower price to the state than I will to developers," the farm was bought using funds from the Nature Conservancy, the federal government, and the State of Oregon. The Nature Conservancy held the property in trust until ownership was transferred to the City of Eugene in 1980.

Along with the house, a detached garage and a stable are included in the National Register listing.

The picnic shelter, although not considered a contributing property for the National Register listing, was designed by the home's original architect, Wallace Hayden, in 1982.

== City park ==
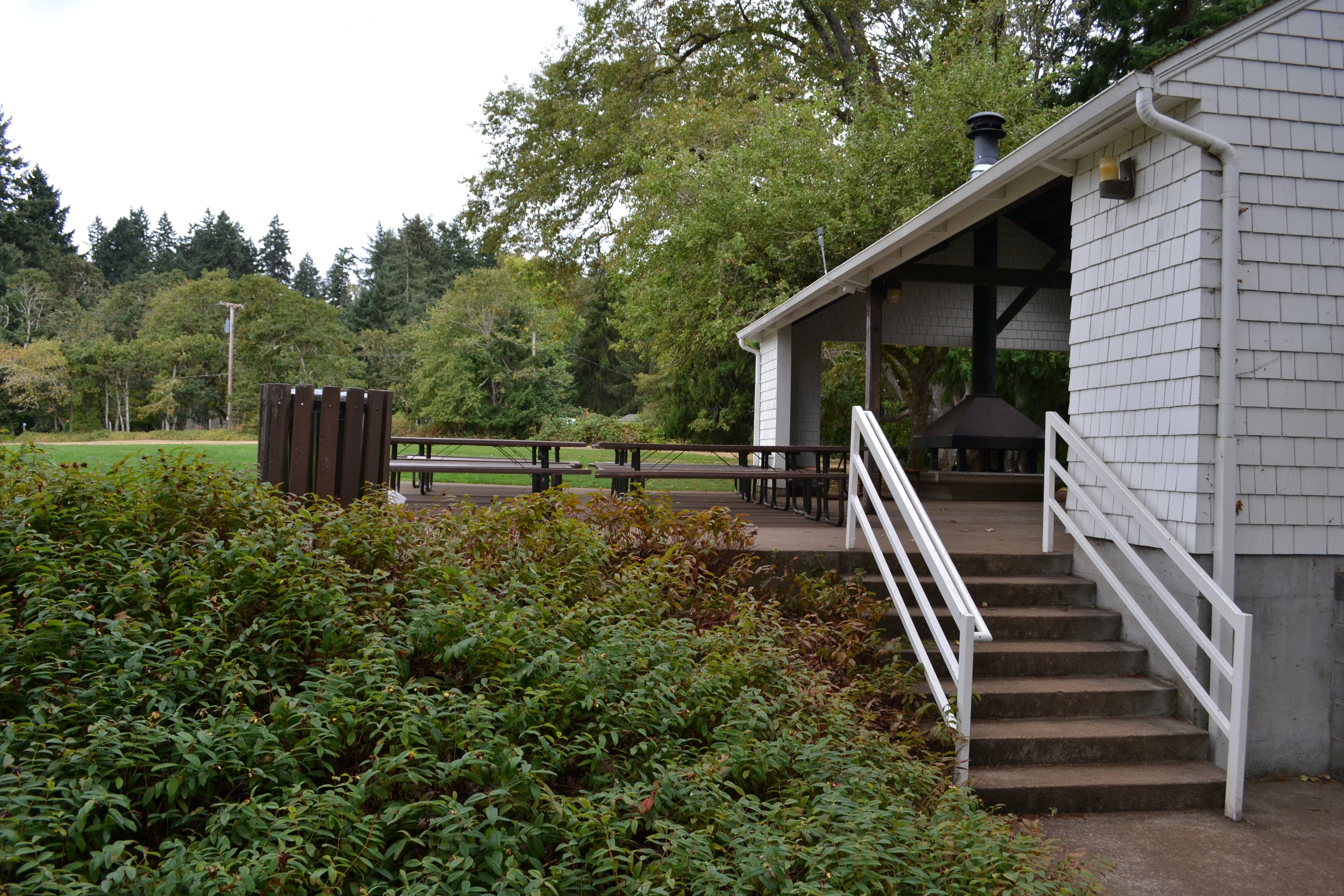
Picnic area

In addition to the house, the 27-acre (110,000 m^{2}) park includes a natural wooded area and meadow. Originally, it was a working farm the Morse family called Edgewood Farm. Today, it is a city park with open space, restrooms, picnic tables, and a large picnic shelter, which is available for rent from May through October. When the shelter is not reserved, it is open to the public.

As of 2024, park grounds are open daily from 6 a.m. until 9:30 p.m. Nature walks are a popular activity. Dogs are permitted in the fenced off-leash dog park.
