= Robert B. Duncan =

American politician (1920–2011)

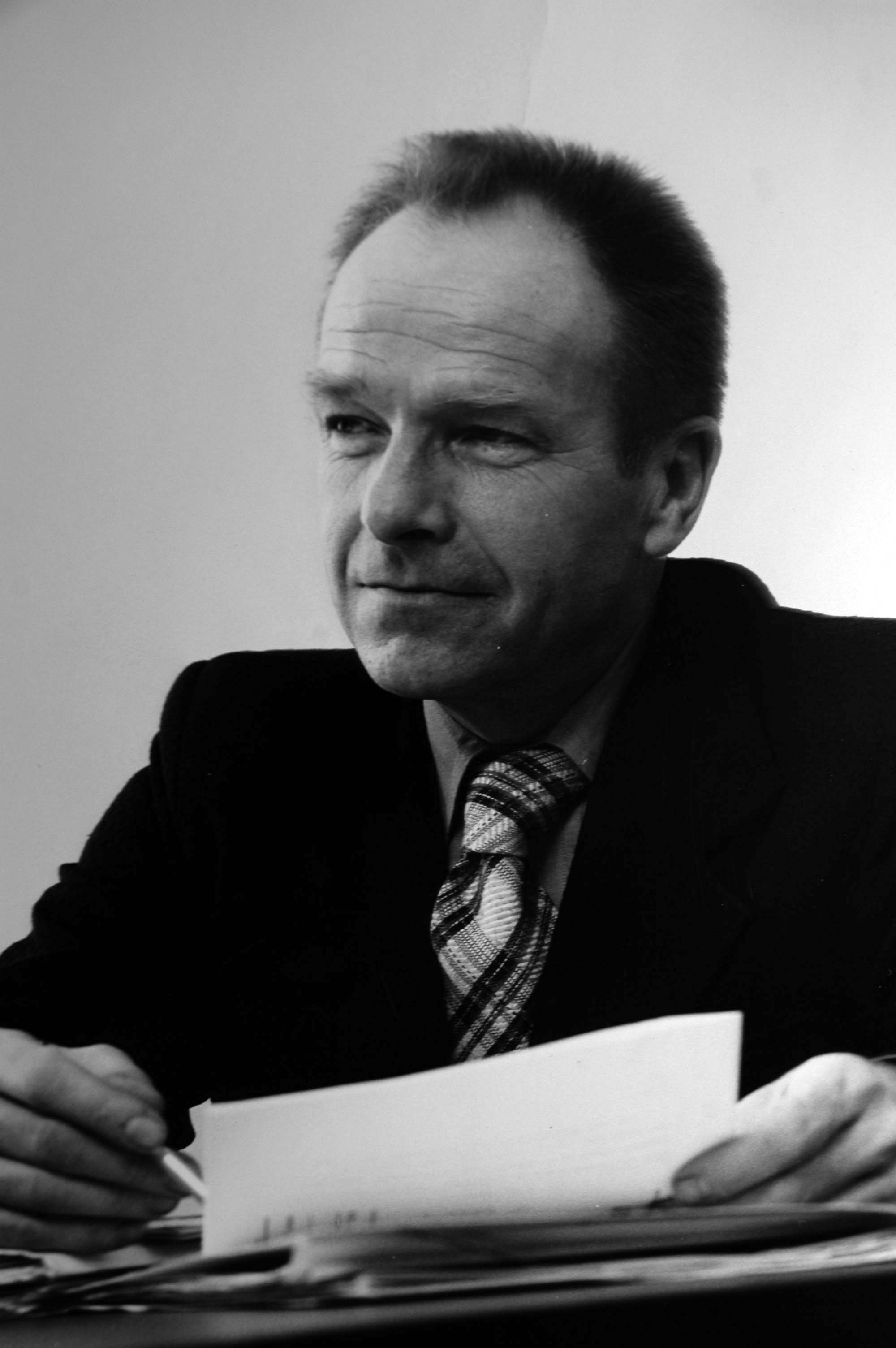

Member of the U.S. House of Representatives from Oregon
- In office January 3, 1975 – January 3, 1981
- Preceded by: Edith Green
- Succeeded by: Ron Wyden
- Constituency: 3rd district
- In office January 3, 1963 – January 3, 1967
- Preceded by: Edwin Durno
- Succeeded by: John Dellenback
- Constituency: 4th district

49th Speaker of the Oregon House of Representatives
- In office 1959–1962
- Preceded by: Pat Dooley
- Succeeded by: Clarence Barton
- Constituency: Jackson County

Personal details
- Born: December 4, 1920 Normal, Illinois, U.S.
- Died: April 29, 2011 (aged 90) Portland, Oregon, U.S.
- Party: Democratic
- Spouses: Marijane Duncan (m. 1942; died 1990) Kathryn Boe (m. 1995)
- Education: Illinois Wesleyan University, University of Michigan Law School

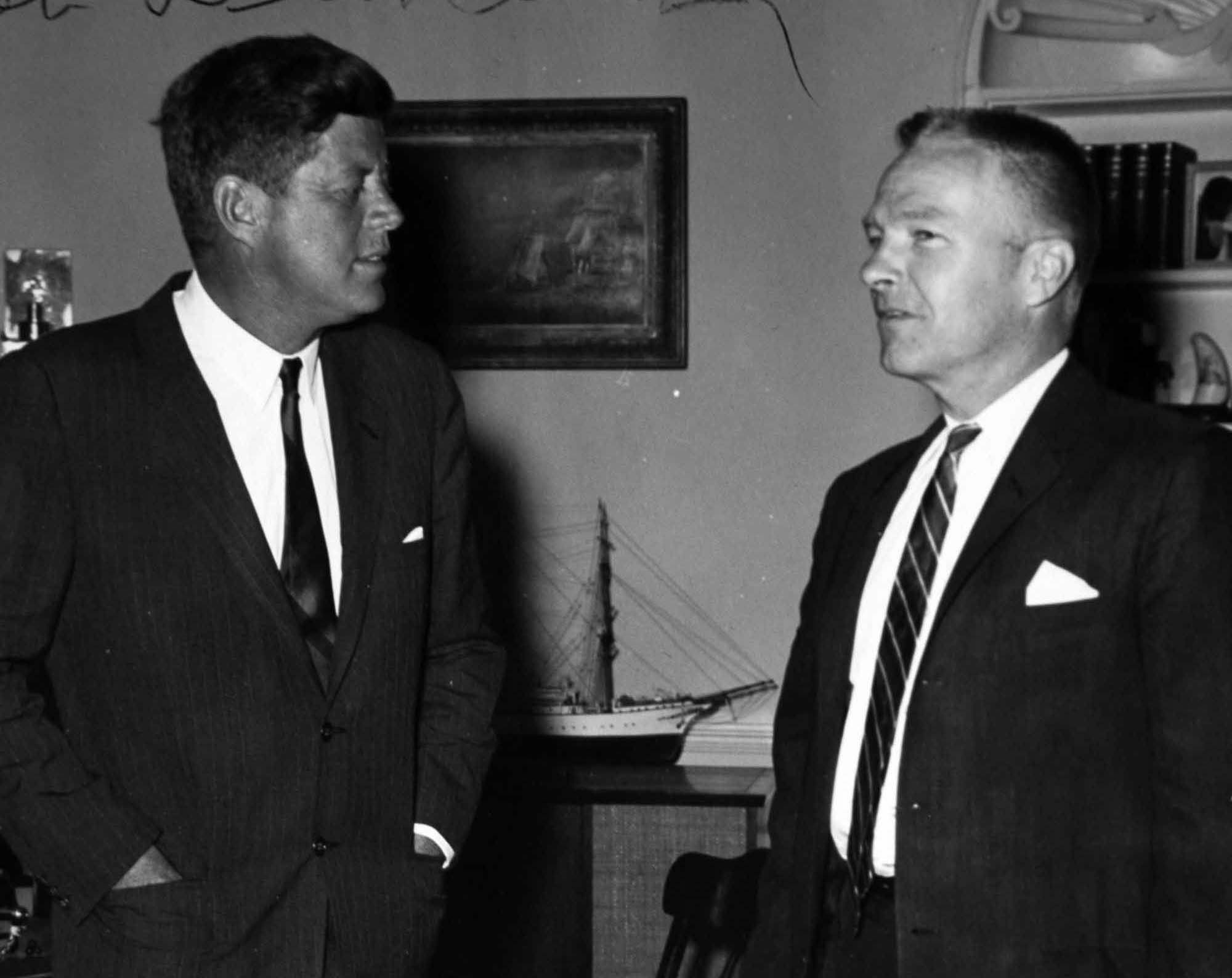
Robert B. Duncan with President John F. Kennedy

Robert Blackford Duncan (December 4, 1920 – April 29, 2011) was an American politician from the state of Oregon. A Democrat, he served multiple terms in the Oregon Legislative Assembly and as a U.S. congressman from Oregon. In the Oregon House of Representatives he served as speaker for four years, and in the U.S. House he represented two different districts. The Illinois native and World War II veteran ran three unsuccessful campaigns to be elected to the U.S. Senate.

== Early life ==
Robert B. Duncan was born in Normal, Illinois, on December 4, 1920. His father, Eugene Duncan, came to Illinois from a family in Missouri whose ascendants were originally from Scotland. His mother, Catherine Blackford, was of Welsh origin—her parents had immigrated from Wales to the United States in the late 19th century.

Robert Duncan was the second of four boys: Carter, Bob, Clark and John Bruce. He attended public schools in Bloomington. In 1939, at the age of 18, he went with a friend to Alaska and he began college at the University of Alaska, staying through 1940 when he transferred to Illinois Wesleyan University where he graduated in 1942 with a bachelor's degree. In college he met fellow student Marijane Beverly Dill (born June 30, 1920) and the two were married on December 19, 1942. The couple would have seven children together. While in Alaska he had worked in the gold fields, and while in Illinois he had worked for a bank and seed company.

During World War II, he served in the United States Merchant Marine and in the United States Naval Air Force as a pilot from 1942 to 1945. In 1948, Duncan received his LL.B from the University of Michigan Law School and passed the bar in October of that year. After graduation Duncan and his family moved from Michigan to Portland and then to Medford in Southern Oregon, where he moved to join the law practice of William M. McAllister.

== Political career ==
In 1954, Duncan was nominated as a write-in candidate for the Oregon House of Representatives. Although he declined for economic reasons, in 1956, he was elected to the Oregon House, serving three terms and was elected Speaker of the Oregon House by his colleagues. In 1962, he was elected to the United States House of Representatives representing Oregon's 4th congressional district based in Medford.

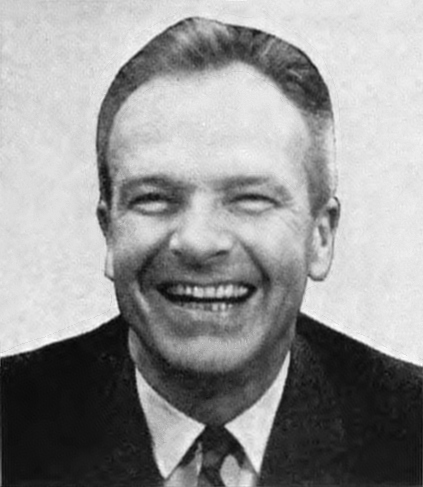
Official portrait, 1975

In the 1966 U.S. Senate election, Duncan was the Democratic candidate for the seat vacated by retiring Senator Maurine B. Neuberger. While Duncan strongly supported President Johnson's Vietnam War policies, his Republican opponent, Governor Mark Hatfield, was an outspoken critic. The differences between Duncan and Hatfield on the war would produce one of the great splits in the modern Oregon Democratic Party. The state's senior U.S. Senator, Wayne Morse—a staunch Democratic opponent of the Vietnam War—endorsed Hatfield over fellow Democrat Duncan, an act that infuriated Democratic Party regulars. This factor, along with Hatfield's statewide popularity, gave Hatfield a narrow victory. In 1967, Duncan moved to Portland where he lived until 1974, returning to the practice of law.

In 1968, Duncan came back to challenge Senator Morse in the Democratic Senate primary. Again, Duncan's war views played a role. Though Duncan was initially far ahead of the anti-war maverick Morse, Morse closed the gap at the end and won a narrow victory, aided by the beginning of the Paris Peace Accords, which brought the possibility of the end of the war. Morse went on to narrowly lose in the general election to Republican state Representative Bob Packwood, who favored continued funding of the war.

Duncan returned to his Portland law practice. He ran once more for the Senate in 1972, again losing the Democratic nomination to Morse, this time by a wider margin. Morse then lost to Senator Hatfield. After Edith Green retired from Congress, Duncan ran for her Portland-based seat from Oregon's 3rd congressional district in 1974 and returned to the House. He served another three terms from 1975 to 1981. He lost in an upset in the 1980 Democratic primary to eventual winner Ron Wyden.

== Later years and family ==
In 1985, he returned to live in Oregon, settling in the coastal community of Yachats. He served on the Northwest Power Planning Council from 1984 to 1988, and as its chairperson in 1987. Following his work on the Council (he left the Council in 1988), Duncan spent his time working on his house in Yachats and on his collection of old cars, and spending time with his seven grandchildren.

Duncan's first wife, Marijane, died November 9, 1990. The couple had seven children. In 1995, Duncan married Kathryn Boe, widow of Jason Boe who had served in the Oregon Senate from 1970 to 1980, four terms as Senate president. Duncan lived in Portland until his death at the age of 90 at the Mirabella retirement home on April 29, 2011.

His papers are housed in the Robert Blackford Duncan collection at the University of Oregon. A four-volume book of his writings is in that collection and also is in the archival collections of Illinois Wesleyan University, Normal, Illinois; the University of Alaska in Fairbanks; and the Oregon Historical Society, Portland.

Party political offices
Preceded by Maurine Neuberger	Democratic nominee for U.S. Senator from Oregon (Class 2); 1966	Succeeded by Wayne Morse
U.S. House of Representatives
Preceded by Edwin Durno	Member of the U.S. House of Representatives from Oregon's 4th congressional district 1963–1967	Succeeded by John Dellenback
Preceded by Edith Green	Member of the U.S. House of Representatives from Oregon's 3rd congressional district 1975–1981	Succeeded by Ron Wyden
