= Betty Roberts =

American judge

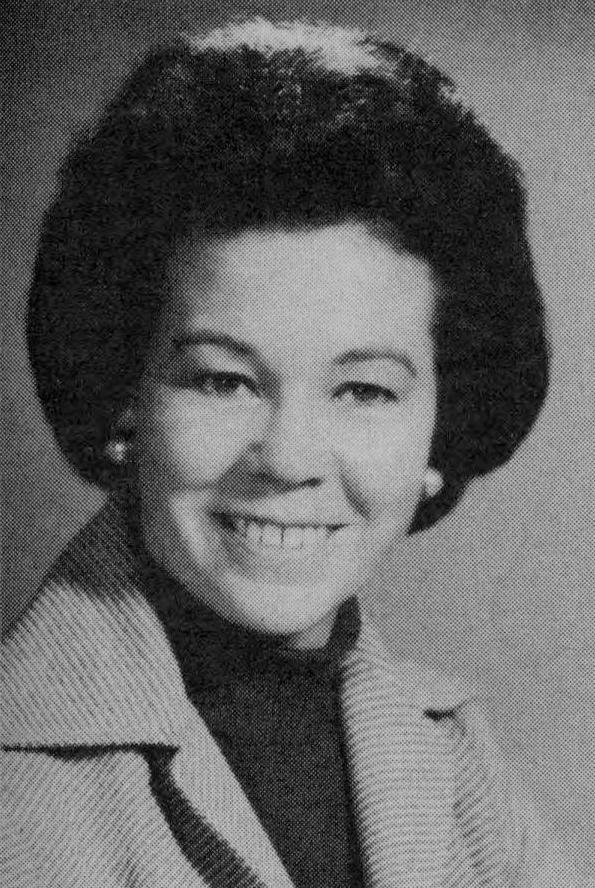

Justice of the Oregon Supreme Court
- In office 1982–1986
- Appointed by: Victor Atiyeh
- Preceded by: Thomas Tongue
- Succeeded by: Michael Gillette

Personal details
- Born: Betty Cantrell; February 5, 1923 Arkansas City, Kansas, U.S.
- Died: June 25, 2011 (aged 88) Portland, Oregon, U.S.
- Party: Democratic
- Spouse(s): Bill Rice (m. 1942–1959) Frank Roberts (m. 1960–1964) Keith Skelton (m. 1968–1995)
- Education: Texas Wesleyan University (attended); Eastern Oregon University (attended); Portland State University (BA); University of Oregon (MA); Lewis and Clark College (JD)

Betty Cantrell Roberts (February 5, 1923 – June 25, 2011) was an American politician and judge from the U.S. state of Oregon. She was the 83rd justice of the Oregon Supreme Court. She was the first woman to serve on the Oregon Supreme Court, and had also been the first woman on the Oregon Court of Appeals. Roberts served from 1982 to 1986 on the high court and from 1977 to 1982 on the Court of Appeals.

A native of Kansas and raised in Texas, Roberts had previously been elected to both chambers of the Oregon Legislative Assembly, but lost bids for the governor's office and the United States Senate, both in 1974. She was married three times, including to Frank L. Roberts and Keith Skelton, both of whom she would serve with in the Oregon Legislative Assembly. She was a private mediator and senior judge until her death due to pulmonary fibrosis.

== Early life ==
Betty Cantrell was born in Arkansas City, Kansas, on February 5, 1923. When she was six, her father became partially paralyzed and the family moved to Texas to be near her mother's family. In Texas, Roberts was raised poor during the Great Depression of the 1930s. She graduated from high school and then attended Texas Wesleyan College in Ft. Worth for one year starting in 1940. In 1942, during WWII, she married John Willard (Bill) Rice, a young soldier from Oregon who was stationed at Sheppard Field. After the war they moved to Oregon, where Bill was a banker, with the family living in Klamath Falls, Lakeview, Gresham, and La Grande. By the 1950s Roberts was the mother of four children, Dian, John Jr., Jo, and Randy.

Roberts enrolled at Eastern Oregon College in La Grande for a single year in 1955. After the family moved to Portland, she enrolled at Portland State College where she graduated in 1958 with a Bachelor of Science degree in education. From 1958 to 1967, Roberts taught high school in the Portland metropolitan area at Reynolds High School, Centennial High School, and David Douglas High School before moving on to teach business law and political science at Mt. Hood Community College from 1967 to 1976. She and Bill Rice divorced in 1959. She became a member of the Lynch Elementary School District school board, serving from 1960 to 1966. She married Frank L. Roberts in 1960, adopting his name and retaining it after their divorce in 1965.

Roberts went on to earn a master's degree in political science from the University of Oregon in 1962. She then attended Northwestern School of Law (now Lewis & Clark Law School) in Portland, where she graduated in 1966 with her Juris Doctor. She earned her degree while attending evening classes at the school, much like she earned her early degrees. During this time she was still teaching high school and successfully ran for a seat in Oregon's House of Representatives.

== Political career ==
Elected in 1964 to the Oregon House as a Democrat from Multnomah County, Roberts won re-election in 1966. In 1968, she won election to the Oregon Senate representing Multnomah County in District 12, and was the only woman in the Oregon Senate at that time. That same year she married fellow legislator Keith D. Skelton, but retained the Roberts surname. However, the Oregon State Bar, The Oregonian newspaper, and the state elections division refused to abide by her decision. She threatened legal action, and eventually was no longer referred to as Mrs. Betty Skelton. While in the Senate she was a cosponsor of the Oregon Bottle Bill that passed in 1971, the first of its kind in the nation. In 1972, Roberts was re-elected to the Senate for another four-year term.

In 1974, Roberts ran for governor of Oregon (the fifth woman to do so), but lost in the Democratic primary to Robert W. Straub. Later that year, following the death of Democratic nominee Wayne Morse, she was picked by the Democratic Party to run on the November ballot for the United States Senate, an unsuccessful bid against incumbent Bob Packwood. In 1975, she was named the Education Citizen of the Year Award by the Oregon Education Association and the Woman of the Year by the Oregon Women's Political Caucus. The next year the Oregon Conference of Seventh Day Adventists gave her their Liberty Award. During this time Roberts also served as a delegate to the Democratic National Convention in 1968, 1972, and 1976, while also practicing law at the firm Skelton & Roberts from 1967 to 1977. She chaired Jimmy Carter's presidential campaign in Oregon in 1976.

== Judicial career ==
When this court gives Oregon law an interpretation corresponding to a federal opinion, our decision remains the Oregon law even when federal doctrine later changes.

— Roberts' opinion in State v. Caraher, 293 Or. 741 (1982).

On September 1, 1977, Governor Robert W. Straub, a former opponent, appointed Roberts to the Oregon Court of Appeals to a new position, along with W. Michael Gillette, George M. Joseph, and John Buttler, when the court expanded from six to ten positions. Roberts was the first woman on that court, as well as the first on any appellate court in Oregon. The next year, she was up for election to retain her seat on the court, and won the election to a full six-year term. While on the court, she faced discrimination from some judges due to her gender, as the chief judge had been against the nomination of a woman to the court.

Prior to completing her term on the court, Roberts resigned on February 8, 1982, when she was appointed by Governor Victor G. Atiyeh to the Oregon Supreme Court. She was appointed to replace the retiring Justice Thomas Tongue, becoming the first woman on the Supreme Court. Later that year, she won election to a full six-year term on the court. In 1982, she wrote the opinion in State v. Charles (293 Or. 273), which adopted the duty to retreat in Oregon. This requires people to attempt to retreat in most situations before one could use deadly force, even in self-defense. That same year she wrote the opinion in the workers' compensation case, Hewitt v. SAIF, that men and women have equal rights under the Oregon Constitution, and so effectively gave Oregon an Equal Rights Amendment.

Roberts was the sole dissenting justice in Bank of Oregon v. Independent News (298 Ore. 434), when the court ruled that banks were not public figures, making it easier for banks and their officials to sue journalists for libel. While on the bench, Roberts was recognized by both the University of Oregon and Portland State University for distinguished service. On February 7, 1986, she resigned her position on the court. Roberts left in part due to the heavy workload of the job, in part due to the daily commute between her home in Portland and the Oregon Supreme Court Building in Salem, partly due to the stress of the job, and in part because her husband was retiring and asked her to travel with him.

== Later years and family ==
Robert's marriage to Keith Skelton lasted until his death on October 23, 1995. In 1986, Oregon's Mary Leonard Law Society for women attorneys gave Roberts their Distinguished Service Award, and the following year the Oregon State Bar Association granted her an Award of Merit, with the Oregon American Civil Liberties Union awarding her a Civil Liberties Award. After leaving the Oregon Supreme Court she was asked to help broker a settlement in a case by the Chief Justice, which led to a career in alternative dispute resolution, primarily as a mediator, but also as an arbitrator.

Roberts helped organize opposition in Oregon to Robert Bork's U.S. Supreme Court nomination. From 1988 to 1991, she was a visiting professor in political science at Oregon State University. In 1988, she received recognition from Portland State University, Oregon State University, and Lewis & Clark Law School. She also served on the state's Commission on Higher Education in the late 1980s.

In 1992, Roberts was given the award bearing her name from the Oregon Women Lawyers. She earned the E. B. MacNaughton Civil Liberties Award from the ACLU in 2004.

In March 2004, she presided over the first legal same-sex marriage in Oregon, which was held during a brief period when Multnomah County issued marriage licenses to same-sex couples.

In 2006, the American Bar Association awarded her the Margaret Brent Award from its Commission on Women in the Profession.

As of 2008, Roberts served as a private mediator in the Portland area, and was a senior judge in Oregon, subject to recall to serve as a temporary judge. Her autobiography, With Grit and By Grace, Breaking Trails in Politics and Law, was published in 2008.

Roberts died in her Portland home of pulmonary fibrosis on June 25, 2011. Representative Earl Blumenauer stated "She was one of a kind.... for over a quarter century, Betty Roberts had as much impact on the political process as anyone in Oregon."

== See also ==
- List of female state supreme court justices
- List of first women lawyers and judges in Oregon

Party political offices
Preceded by Wayne Morse; Deceased	Democratic nominee for U.S. Senator from Oregon (Class 3); 1974	Succeeded by Ted Kulongoski
