= 1968 United States Senate election in Oregon =

- November 5, 1968
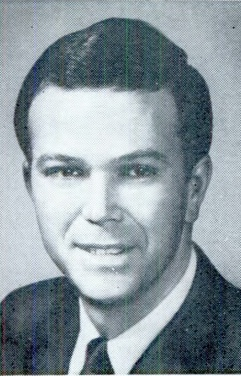

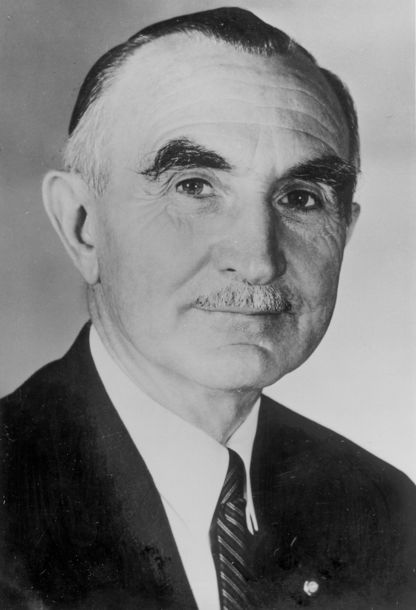
Nominee	Bob Packwood	Wayne Morse
Party	Republican	Democratic
Popular vote	408,646	405,353
Percentage	50.20%	49.80%
- County results Packwood: 50–60% 60–70% Morse: 50–60%
U.S. senator before election
Wayne Morse
Democratic
Elected U.S. Senator
Bob Packwood
Republican

The 1968 United States Senate election in Oregon was held on November 5, 1968. Incumbent Democratic U.S. Senator Wayne Morse was seeking a fifth term, but narrowly lost re-election to 36 year-old Republican State Representative Bob Packwood in a very close race.

== Democratic primary ==
The general primary was held May 28, 1968. Incumbent Senator Wayne Morse defeated former Representative Robert B. Duncan. Duncan, an outspoken supporter of the Vietnam War, had previously been the Democratic nominee in the 1966 United States Senate election in Oregon, and the anti-war Morse had endorsed Duncan's opponent Mark Hatfield, an anti-war Republican.

=== Candidates ===
- Wayne Morse, incumbent U.S. Senator since 1945.
- Robert B. Duncan, former U.S. Congressman from Oregon's 4th congressional district (1963–1967).
- Phil McAlmond, millionaire and former aide to opponent Robert B. Duncan.

=== Results ===
Democratic primary for the United States Senate from Oregon, 1968
Party	Candidate	Votes	%
Democratic	Wayne Morse (incumbent)	185,091	49.03%
Democratic	Robert B. Duncan	174,795	46.30%
Democratic	Phil McAlmond	17,658	4.68%
Total votes		377,544	100.00%

== General election ==
=== Candidates ===
- Bob Packwood (R), State Rep.
- Wayne Morse (D), incumbent U.S. Senator

=== Results ===
General election results
Party	Candidate	Votes	%
Republican	Bob Packwood	408,646	50.20%
Democratic	Wayne Morse (incumbent)	405,353	49.80%
Total votes		813,999	100.00%
Republican gain from Democratic			

=== Results by County ===
County	Wayne Morse Democratic		Bob Packwood Republican	
County	%	#	%	#
Baker	50.5%	3,192	49.5%	3,129
Benton	45.7%	8,571	54.3%	10,185
Clackamas	49.1%	31,305	50.8%	32,395
Clatsop	47.7%	6,091	52.2%	6,674
Columbia	56.5%	6,244	43.4%	4,802
Coos	58.7%	12,369	41.2%	8,687
Crook	51.2%	1,852	48.7%	1,760
Curry	59.7%	2,815	40.2%	1,893
Deschutes	47.6%	5,396	52.3%	5,923
Douglas	46.5%	12,063	53.4%	13,835
Gilliam	46.1%	518	53.8%	605
Grant	51.0%	1,440	48.9%	1,380
Harney	50.4%	1,437	49.5%	1,412
Hood River	49.8%	2,640	50.0%	2,651
Jackson	45.2%	15,508	54.7%	18,773
Jefferson	47.9%	1,445	52.0%	1,569
Josephine	38.7%	5,578	61.2%	8,800
Klamath	45.7%	7,740	54.2%	9,122
Lake	43.8%	1,109	56.1%	1,422
Lane	51.6%	41,289	48.3%	38,619
Lincoln	48.8%	5,170	51.2%	5,424
Linn	50.0%	12,161	49.9%	12,150
Malheur	39.1%	3,249	60.8%	5,050
Marion	44.0%	24,381	55.9%	30,946
Morrow	48.8%	963	51.1%	1,010
Multnomah	54.3%	131,052	45.6%	110,166
Polk	44.4%	5,535	55.5%	6,919
Sherman	43.4%	473	56.5%	615
Tillamook	53.5%	3,923	46.4%	3,401
Umatilla	44.5%	7,273	55.4%	9,051
Union	54.9%	4,252	45.0%	3,480
Wallowa	46.9%	1,291	53.0%	1,458
Wasco	50.8%	4,203	49.1%	4,064
Washington	43.8%	25,886	56.1%	33,202
Wheeler	48.6%	374	51.3%	395
Yamhill	46.2%	6,565	53.7%	7,629

== See also ==
- 1968 United States Senate elections
