= Judge Nathan S. Roberts House =

Historic house in New York, United States

- U.S. National Register of Historic Places
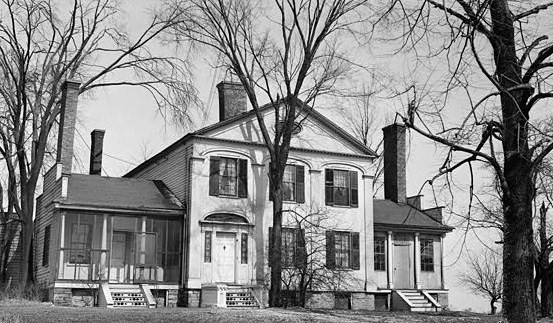
- Judge Nathan Roberts House, 1934

- Location within New York Location within the United States
- Location: W. Seneca Ave., Canastota, New York
- Coordinates: 43°4′6″N 75°45′32″W
- Area: 3.5 acres (1.4 ha)
- Built: 1820
- Architectural style: Federal
- MPS: Canastota Village MRA
- NRHP reference No.: 86001305
- Added to NRHP: May 23, 1986

Judge Nathan S. Roberts House is a historic home located at Canastota in Madison County, New York. It was built about 1820 and is a distinguished example of the Federal style. It is the oldest surviving building in Canastota.

It was added to the National Register of Historic Places in 1986.
