= Edith Green =

American politician (1910–1987)

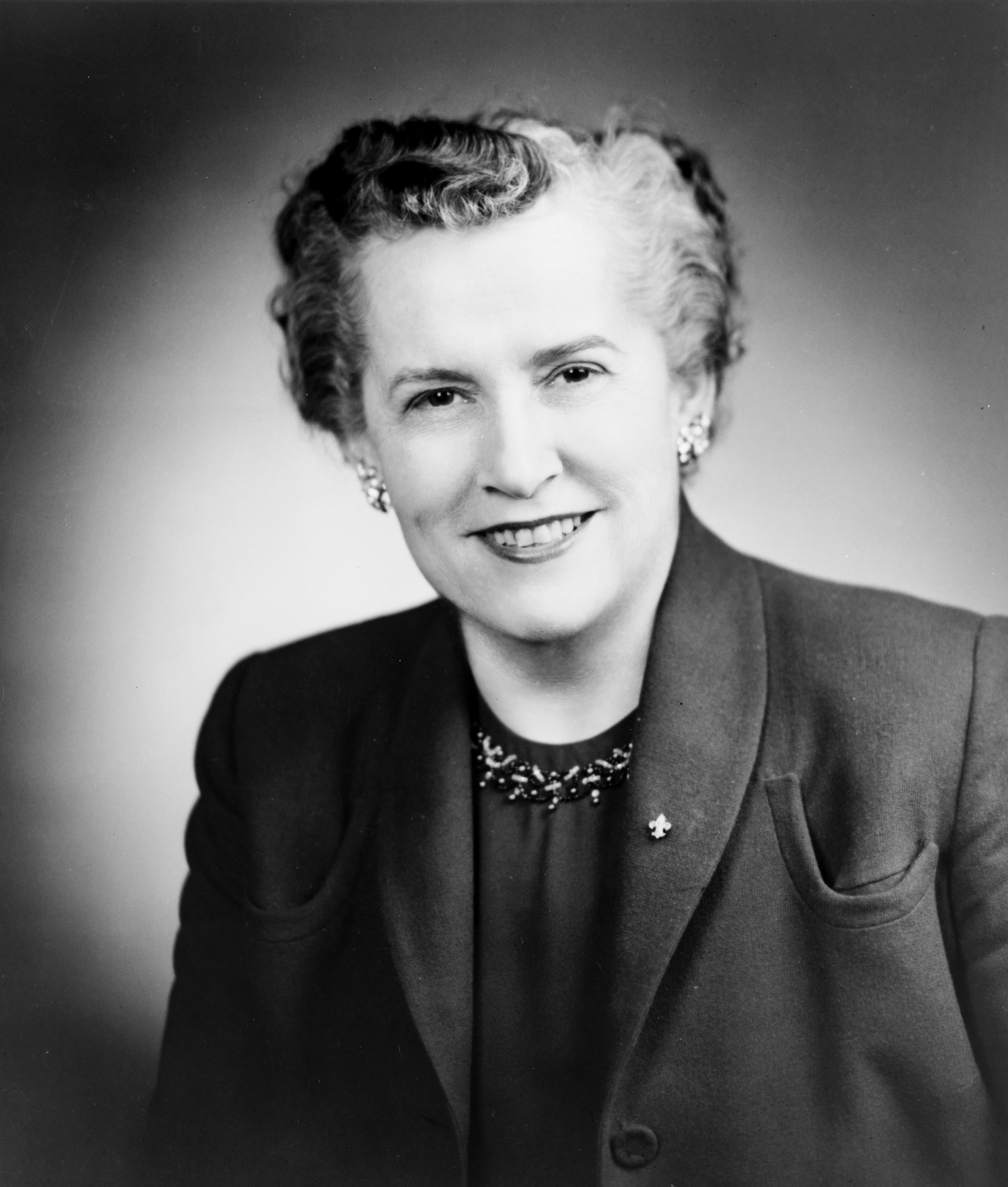

Member of the U.S. House of Representatives from Oregon's 3rd district
- In office January 3, 1955 – December 31, 1974
- Preceded by: Homer D. Angell
- Succeeded by: Robert B. Duncan

Personal details
- Born: Edith Louise Starrett; January 17, 1910 Trent, South Dakota, U.S.
- Died: April 21, 1987 (aged 77) Tualatin, Oregon, U.S.
- Party: Democratic
- Spouse: Arthur Green (m. 1933–1963)
- Education: Willamette University (attended); University of Oregon (BA); Stanford University (attended)

Edith Louise Starrett Green (January 17, 1910 – April 21, 1987) was an American politician and educator from Oregon. She was the second Oregonian woman to be elected to the U.S. House of Representatives and served a total of ten terms, from 1955 to 1974, as a Democrat.

Green advanced women's issues, education, library support and social reform; she played an instrumental role in passing the 1972 Equal Opportunity in Education Act, better known as Title IX.

== Early life ==
She was born Edith Louise Starrett in Trent, South Dakota. Her family moved to Oregon in 1916, where she attended schools in Salem, graduating from Salem High School (Now known as North Salem High School) in 1927. Then attending Willamette University from 1927 to 1929. She worked as a schoolteacher and advocate of education in 1929, married Arthur N. Green in 1930, and left school to begin a family.

In 1939 Green went back to school and earned a bachelor's degree from the University of Oregon and did graduate study at Stanford University. She became a radio commentator and writer in the 1940s, but her interest in educational issues led her to become a lobbyist for the Oregon Education Association.

She was an honorary member of Delta Sigma Theta sorority.

== Political career ==
A Democrat, Green first ran for political office in 1952 as the Democratic candidate for Oregon Secretary of State. She was defeated in a close race by incumbent Earl T. Newbry. In 1954, she was elected as the representative for Oregon's 3rd congressional district, defeating Republican nominee (and future Oregon governor) Tom McCall. Green was the second woman (after Nan Wood Honeyman) to be elected to the House from Oregon, and one of only 17 women in the House at the time of her election.

Throughout her ten terms as a representative, Green focused on women's issues, education, and social reform. In 1955 Green proposed the Equal Pay Act, to ensure that men and women were paid equally for equal work. The bill was signed into law eight years later. Other significant legislation that she introduced included the Alaska Mental Health Enabling Act of 1956, which reformed the mental health care system of the then Alaska Territory; the Library Services Act, which provided access to libraries for rural communities; the Higher Education Facilities Act of 1963, which Lyndon Johnson called "the greatest step forward in the field since the passage of the Land-Grant Act of 1862", and the Higher Education Act of 1965 and 1967. Green's commitment to education earned her epithets like "the Mother of Higher Education" and "Mrs. Education".

Green also provided significant input to the National Defense Education Act of 1958, intended to keep the United States ahead of the Soviet Union during the space race after the launch of Sputnik 1.

Green helped to develop the legislation that was to become Title IX, now-called the Patsy T. Mink Equal Opportunity in Education Act. The law prohibited sex discrimination in federally funded educational institutions. In the late 1960s, after noting that while programs existed to keep boys in school but no similar programs existed for girls, Green sought to correct this inequality. After Bernice Sandler's work, Green helped to introduce a higher education bill that contained provisions regarding gender equity in education. The hearings on this bill, working together with fellow Representative Patsy Mink and Senator Birch Bayh, eventually resulted in the passage of Title IX in 1972. In 1964, she was the only woman in the House of Representatives who voted against including sex as a protected class in Title VII of the Civil Rights Act of 1964; the amendment to do so had been introduced by Virginia Congressman Howard W. Smith in an attempt to sink the bill. In order not to endanger passage of the bill prohibiting discrimination on the basis of race, color, religion, or national origin, Green was willing to forego the inclusion of sex, noting "For every discrimination that I have suffered, the Negro woman has suffered ten times that amount of discrimination."

Senator Mark Hatfield called Green "the most powerful woman ever to serve in the Congress". Adlai Stevenson selected her to second his nomination at the 1956 Democratic National Convention, John F. Kennedy also selected her to second his nomination at the 1960 Democratic National Convention, and she headed the state primary campaigns for John F. Kennedy, Robert F. Kennedy, and Henry M. "Scoop" Jackson.

Green herself had been considered a contender for U.S. Senate several times, most notably in 1966, against eventual winner Mark Hatfield. She declined each time, however, to turn her House seniority for junior status in the Senate.

== After Congress ==
Green decided not to seek an eleventh term in 1974 and resigned on December 31, 1974, just before her final term expired; she was succeeded by Robert B. Duncan. She returned to Portland, Oregon, and became a professor of government at Warner Pacific College. In 1976, she was co-chairwoman of National Democrats for Gerald Ford. She was appointed to the Oregon State Board of Higher Education in 1979. Later living in Wilsonville, she was appointed by President Ronald Reagan to the President's Commission on White House Fellowships in 1981.

Edith Green died on April 21, 1987, in Tualatin and was buried at Mountain View Cemetery in Corbett, Oregon. The Edith Green – Wendell Wyatt Federal Building in downtown Portland is named in her honor along with Congressman Wendell Wyatt, alongside whom she served during part of her tenure in Congress.

== See also ==
- Women in the United States House of Representatives

U.S. House of Representatives
Preceded by Homer D. Angell	Member of the U.S. House of Representatives from Oregon's 3rd congressional district 1955–1974	Succeeded by Robert B. Duncan
