= Bob Packwood =

American politician (1932–2026)

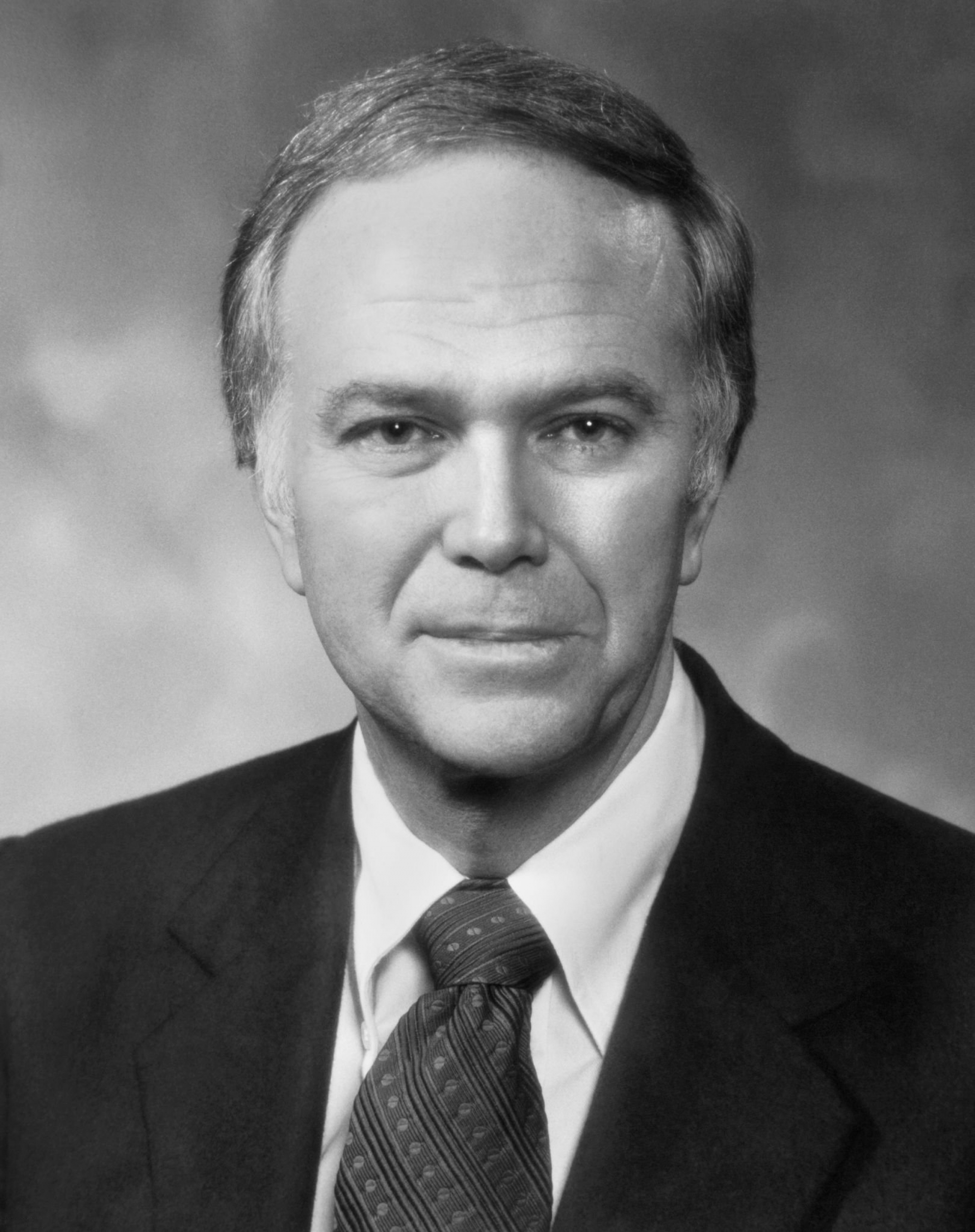
- Packwood sometime before 1996

United States Senator from Oregon
- In office January 3, 1969 – October 1, 1995
- Preceded by: Wayne Morse
- Succeeded by: Ron Wyden
Committee positions
Chair of the Senate Finance Committee
In office January 3, 1995 – October 1, 1995
| Preceded by | Daniel Patrick Moynihan |
| Succeeded by | William Roth |
In office January 3, 1985 – January 3, 1987
| Preceded by | Bob Dole |
| Succeeded by | Lloyd Bentsen |
Ranking Member of the Senate Finance Committee
In office January 3, 1987 – January 3, 1995
| Preceded by | Russell Long |
| Succeeded by | Pat Moynihan |
Chair of the Senate Commerce Committee
In office January 3, 1981 – January 3, 1985
| Preceded by | Howard Cannon |
| Succeeded by | John Danforth |
Chair of the National Republican Senatorial Committee
In office January 3, 1981 – January 3, 1983
| Leader | Howard Baker |
| Preceded by | John Heinz |
| Succeeded by | Richard Lugar |
In office January 3, 1977 – January 3, 1979
| Leader | Howard Baker |
| Preceded by | Ted Stevens |
| Succeeded by | John Heinz |

Member of the Oregon House of Representatives from the 6th district
- In office January 14, 1963 – January 3, 1969
- Preceded by: Multi-member district
- Succeeded by: Multi-member district

Personal details
- Born: Robert William Packwood; September 11, 1932 Portland, Oregon, U.S.
- Died: June 6, 2026 (aged 93) Rancho Mirage, California, U.S.
- Party: Republican
- Spouses: Georgie Oberteuffer Crockatt (m. 1964; div. 1992); Elaine Franklin (m. 1998)
- Children: 2
- Education: California Institute of Technology (attended); Willamette University (BA); New York University (JD)
- Packwood's voice Packwood introducing an amendment to the Community Development Banking and Financial Institutions Act of 1994. Recorded March 16, 1994

Robert William Packwood (September 11, 1932 – June 6, 2026) was an American lawyer and politician from Oregon who served as a member of the Oregon House of Representatives representing the 6th district from 1963 to 1969 and as a member of the United States Senate from 1969 to 1995. He resigned from the U.S. Senate under threat of expulsion in 1995 after allegations of sexual harassment, sexual abuse, and assault of women emerged. He was a member of the Republican Party.

== Early life and career ==
Robert William Packwood was born in Portland, Oregon, on September 11, 1932, to Frederick William Packwood and Gladys Taft. He attended California Institute of Technology before graduating from Willamette University, where one of his professors was future U.S. Senator Mark Hatfield, in 1954. He received the Root-Tilden-Kern Scholarship to New York University School of Law and graduated in 1957. In 1964, he married Georgie Ann Oberteuffer, with whom he would adopt two children.

Packwood was the great-grandson of William Packwood, the youngest member of the Oregon Constitutional Convention of 1857. Packwood had his great-grandfather's political bent from his early years. During his undergraduate years, he participated in Young Republican activities and worked on political campaigns, including later Governor of Oregon and U.S. Senate member Mark Hatfield's first run for the Oregon House of Representatives. He earned national awards in moot court competition and was elected student body president at New York University.

== State legislative career ==
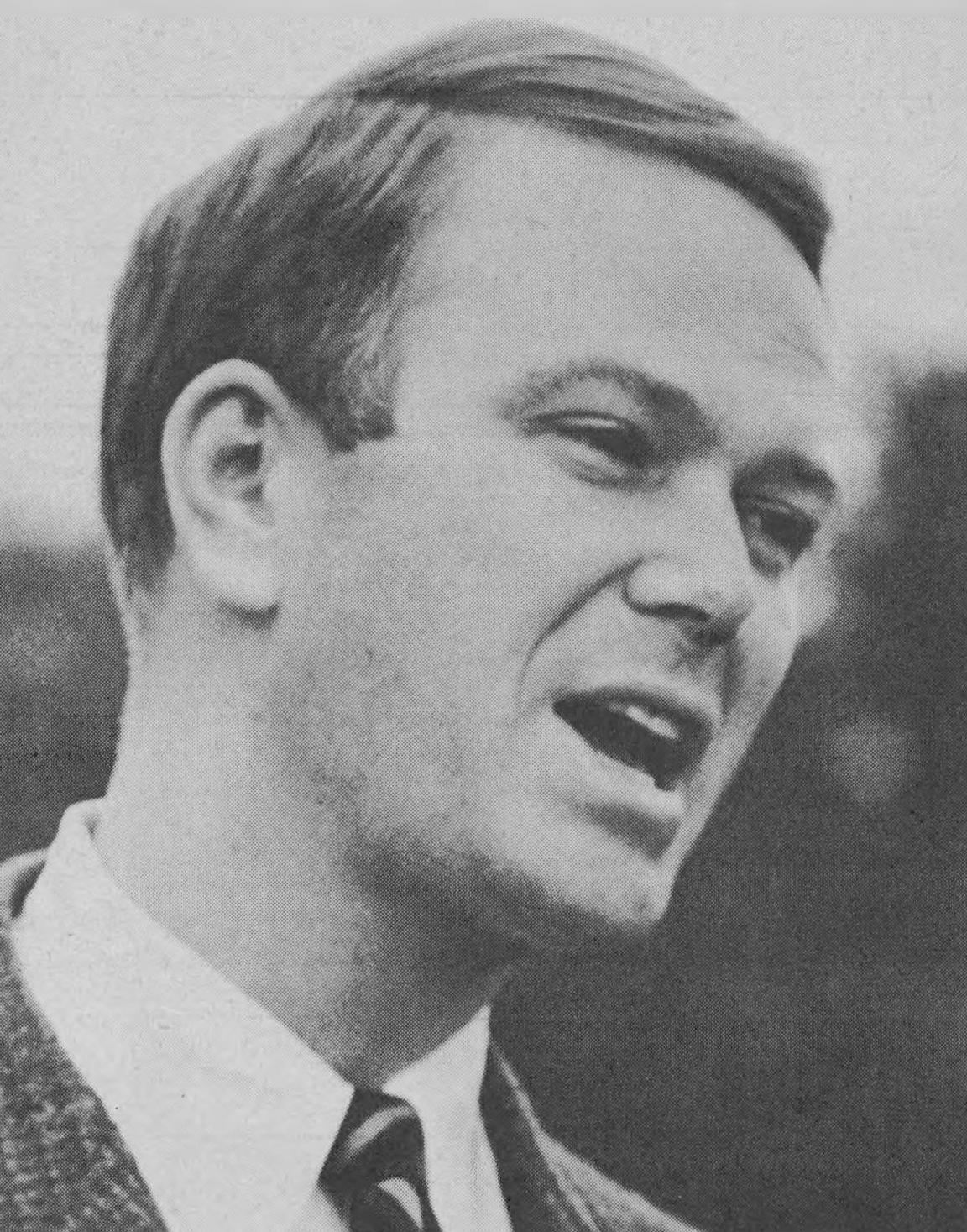
Packwood in 1968

In 1960, he was elected Chairman of the Multnomah County, Oregon, Republican Central Committee, thus becoming the youngest party chairman of a major metropolitan area in the country. In 1962, he became the youngest member of the Oregon Legislature when he was elected to the Oregon House of Representatives after a campaign waged by what The Oregonian called "one of the most effective working organizations in many an election moon in Oregon". Hundreds of volunteers went door-to-door, distributing leaflets throughout the district, and put up lawn signs that became "literally a geographical feature" of the district. Because of the effectiveness of his own campaigns, Packwood was selected to organize a political action committee that recruited attractive Republican candidates for the Oregon House throughout the state.

== U.S. Senator ==
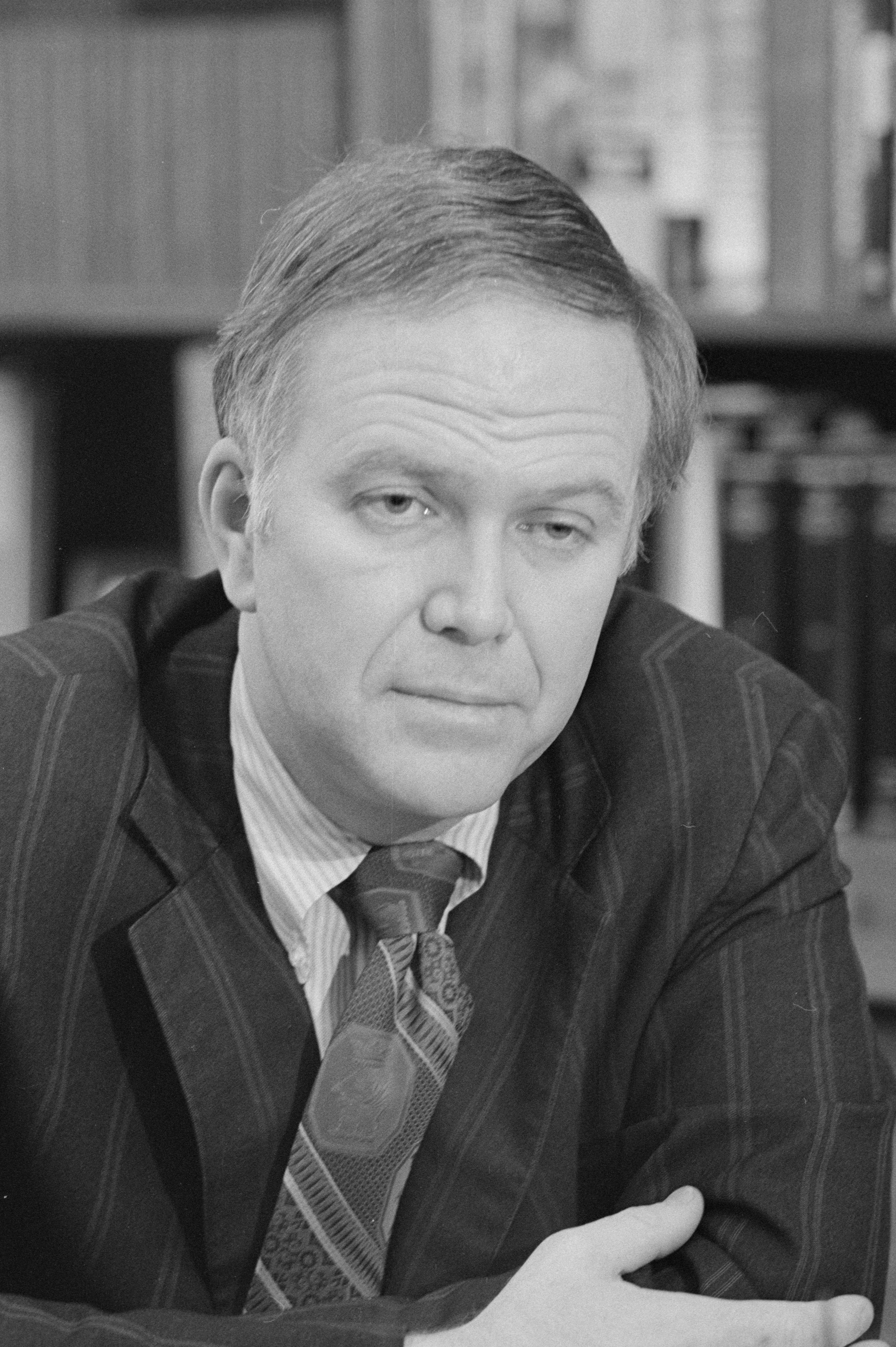
Packwood in 1977

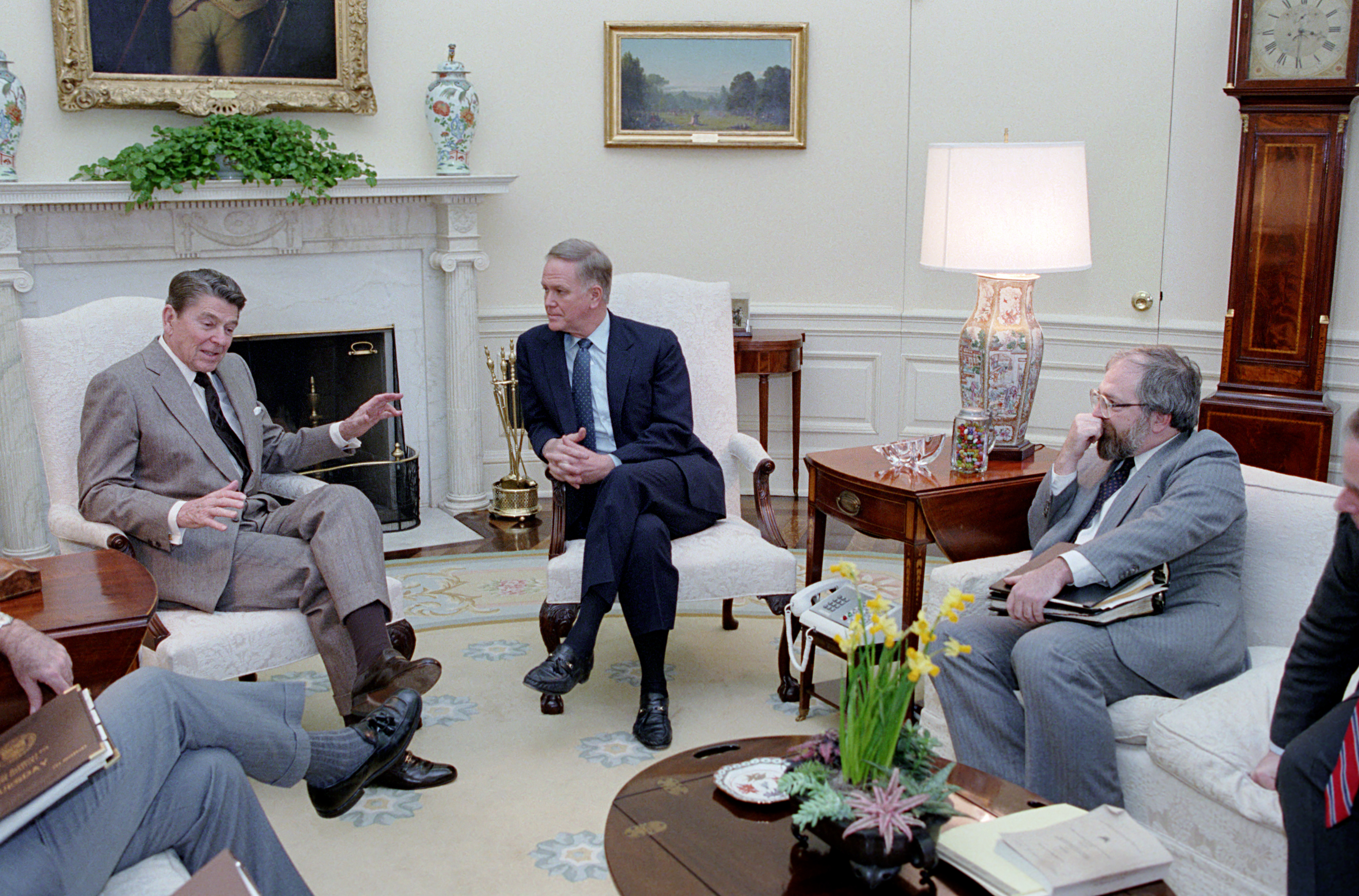
Packwood discusses tax reform with President Ronald Reagan in 1986

In 1968, Packwood was nominated to run for the U.S. Senate in Oregon as the Republican candidate against Democratic Party incumbent Wayne Morse. A statewide recount in which over 100,000 ballots were challenged by both parties, Packwood was declared the winner by 3,500 votes. Packwood replaced U.S. Senate member Ted Kennedy from Massachusetts as the youngest member of the U.S. Senate.

Packwood's voting record was moderate. He supported restrictions on gun owners and liberal civil rights legislation. Packwood voted in favor of the act establishing Martin Luther King Jr. Day as a federal holiday and the Civil Rights Restoration Act of 1987 (as well as to override President of the United States Ronald Reagan's veto).

Packwood differed with President Richard Nixon on some significant issues. He voted against Nixon's Supreme Court of the United States nominees Clement Haynsworth and G. Harrold Carswell, as well as Nixon's proposals for the Rockwell B-1 Lancer, submarines capable of carrying the Trident and the Supersonic transport (SST). He became the first U.S. Senate Republican to support the Impeachment process against Richard Nixon, which was made redundant by the President's resignation. In a White House meeting on November 15, 1973, he told Nixon that the public no longer believed him, and no longer trusted the integrity of the administration.

Before Roe v. Wade was decided, Packwood introduced the Senate's first abortion legalization bill, but he was unable to attract a co-sponsor for it. His abortion-rights movement stance earned him the loyalty of many feminist groups, and numerous awards, including those from the Planned Parenthood Federation of America (January 10, 1983) and the National Women's Political Caucus (October 23, 1985). In 1987, Packwood crossed party lines to vote against the nomination of Robert Bork to the Supreme Court of the United States, and he was one of only two Republicans to vote against the Clarence Thomas Supreme Court nomination in 1991. Both votes were based on the nominee's opposition to abortion rights.

Deregulation was another interest of Packwood's. In the late 1970s, he became a passionate supporter of trucking deregulation, and a "persuasive spokesman" for reform.

He was most noted for his role in the 1986 tax reform, while he was chairman of the Senate Finance Committee. President Ronald Reagan had proposed the idea of tax reform in 1984, but Packwood's initial response was indifferent. However, he played a leading role in fashioning a tax code that would raise business taxes by some $120 billion over five years, and lower personal income taxes by roughly the same amount.

Packwood's floor management has been credited with killing President Bill Clinton's 1993 health care bill. He was also stubborn; in 1988, he was carried feet-first into the Senate Chamber by Capitol Police for a quorum call on campaign finance reform legislation.

== Resignation ==
=== Sexual misconduct as a U.S. Senator ===
Packwood's political career began to unravel in November 1992, when a Washington Post story detailed claims of sexual abuse and assault from 10 women, mainly former staffers and lobbyists. Publication of the story was delayed until after the 1992 election, as Packwood had denied the allegations and the Post had not gathered enough information about the story at the time. Packwood defeated the Democratic nominee, U.S. House of Representatives member Les AuCoin, 52.1% to 46.5%—a much closer race than any he had had since his initial run for the seat a quarter-century earlier. Eventually, 19 women came forward.

As the situation developed, Packwood's diary became a point of contention, including whether it could be subpoenaed and whether it was protected by the Fifth Amendment's self-incrimination clause. He divulged 5,000 pages to the United States Senate Select Committee on Ethics but balked when the committee demanded a further 3,200 pages. It was discovered that he had edited the diary to remove what were allegedly references to sexual encounters and the sexual abuse allegations made against him. Around this time, Packwood made comments that some of his colleagues interpreted as a threat to expose wrongdoing by other members of Congress. His diary allegedly detailed some of his abusive behavior toward women and, according to a press statement made by Richard Bryan, at that time a U.S. Senate member from Nevada, "raised questions about possible violations of one or more laws, including criminal laws".

=== Expulsion recommendation and resignation ===
Despite pressure for open hearings from the public and from female U.S. Senate members, especially Barbara Boxer from California, the Senate ultimately decided against them. The Ethics Committee's indictment, running to 10 volumes and 10,145 pages, much of it from Packwood's own writings, according to a report in The New York Times, detailed the sexual misconduct, obstruction of justice, and ethics charges being made against him. The chairman of the Ethics Committee, Republican U.S. Senate member Mitch McConnell from Kentucky, referred to Packwood's "habitual pattern of aggressive, blatantly sexual advances, mostly directed at members of his own staff or others whose livelihoods were connected in some way to his power and authority as a Senator" and said Packwood's behavior included "deliberately altering and destroying relevant portions of his diary" that Packwood himself had described in the diary as "very incriminating information". On September 7, the committee unanimously recommended that Packwood be expelled from the Senate.

The following morning, the committee released its findings. With bipartisan pressure mounting, Packwood announced his resignation from the Senate, saying that he was "aware of the dishonor that has befallen me in the last three years" and his "duty to resign". Democratic nominee Ron Wyden won the seat in a special election.

After the sexual harassment case came to light, Packwood entered the Hazelden Betty Ford Foundation clinic for alcoholism in Minnesota, blaming his drinking for the harassment.

Four years later, during debate on the impeachment of Bill Clinton, McConnell said that the Republicans had known that Packwood's seat would very likely fall to the Democrats if Packwood were forced out. However, McConnell said, he and his fellow Republicans felt that it came down to a choice of "retain the Senate seat or retain our honor".

== Later life and death ==
Packwood and his wife divorced in 1991. In 1998, he married his Senate chief of staff, Elaine Franklin, who had defended him from media attacks during the misconduct scandal.

Soon after leaving the Senate, Packwood founded the lobbying firm Sunrise Research Corporation. He received contracts from numerous clients, among them being Freightliner Trucks, Marriott International, and Northwest Airlines, which earned him over $440,000 in 1998. In 2015, Packwood returned to the Senate as a witness for the Committee on Finance, which was again considering tax reform. He and U.S. Senate member Bill Bradley from New Jersey spoke on the Tax Reform Act of 1986.

Packwood died at a hospice facility in Rancho Mirage, California, on June 6, 2026, at the age of 93.

== Political positions ==
He was a supporter of Israel. He opposed a sale of F-15s to Saudi Arabia under President Reagan.

Environmentalists praised Packwood for his advocacy of solar energy, container-deposit legislation, and bike paths.

== See also ==
- List of American federal politicians convicted of crimes
- List of federal political scandals in the United States
- List of federal political sex scandals in the United States
- List of United States senators expelled or censured

Party political offices
| Preceded by Sig Unander | Republican nominee for U.S. Senator from Oregon (Class 3); 1968, 1974, 1980, 1986, 1992 | Succeeded by Gordon H. Smith |
| Preceded by Ted Stevens | Chair of the National Republican Senatorial Committee; 1977–1979 | Succeeded by John Heinz |
| Preceded by Carl Curtis | Chair of the Senate Republican Conference; 1979–1981 | Succeeded by James A. McClure |
| Preceded by John Heinz | Chair of the National Republican Senatorial Committee; 1981–1983 | Succeeded by Richard Lugar |
U.S. Senate
| Preceded by Wayne Morse | U.S. Senator (Class 3) from Oregon; 1969–1995; Served alongside: Mark Hatfield | Succeeded by Ron Wyden |
| Preceded by James B. Pearson | Ranking Member of the Senate Commerce Committee; 1979–1981 | Succeeded by Howard Cannon |
| Preceded by Howard Cannon | Chair of the Senate Commerce Committee; 1981–1985 | Succeeded by John Danforth |
| Preceded by Bob Dole | Chair of the Senate Finance Committee; 1985–1987 | Succeeded by Lloyd Bentsen |
| Preceded by Bill Brock | Co-Chair of the Senate Committee System Study Committee; 1977; Served alongside: Adlai Stevenson III | Position abolished |
| Preceded by Russell B. Long | Ranking Member of the Senate Finance Committee; 1987–1995 | Succeeded by Daniel Patrick Moynihan |
| Preceded by Daniel Patrick Moynihan | Chair of the Senate Finance Committee; 1995 | Succeeded by William Roth |
Honorary titles
| Preceded by Ted Kennedy | Baby of the Senate; 1969–1971 | Succeeded by John V. Tunney |
| Preceded by Fred R. Harris | Most senior living U.S. senator Sitting or Former; 2024–2026 | Succeeded by Sam Nunn |
