= 44th Oregon Legislative Assembly =

Oregon legislature, 1947

←	43rd Legislative Assembly	45th Legislative Assembly	→
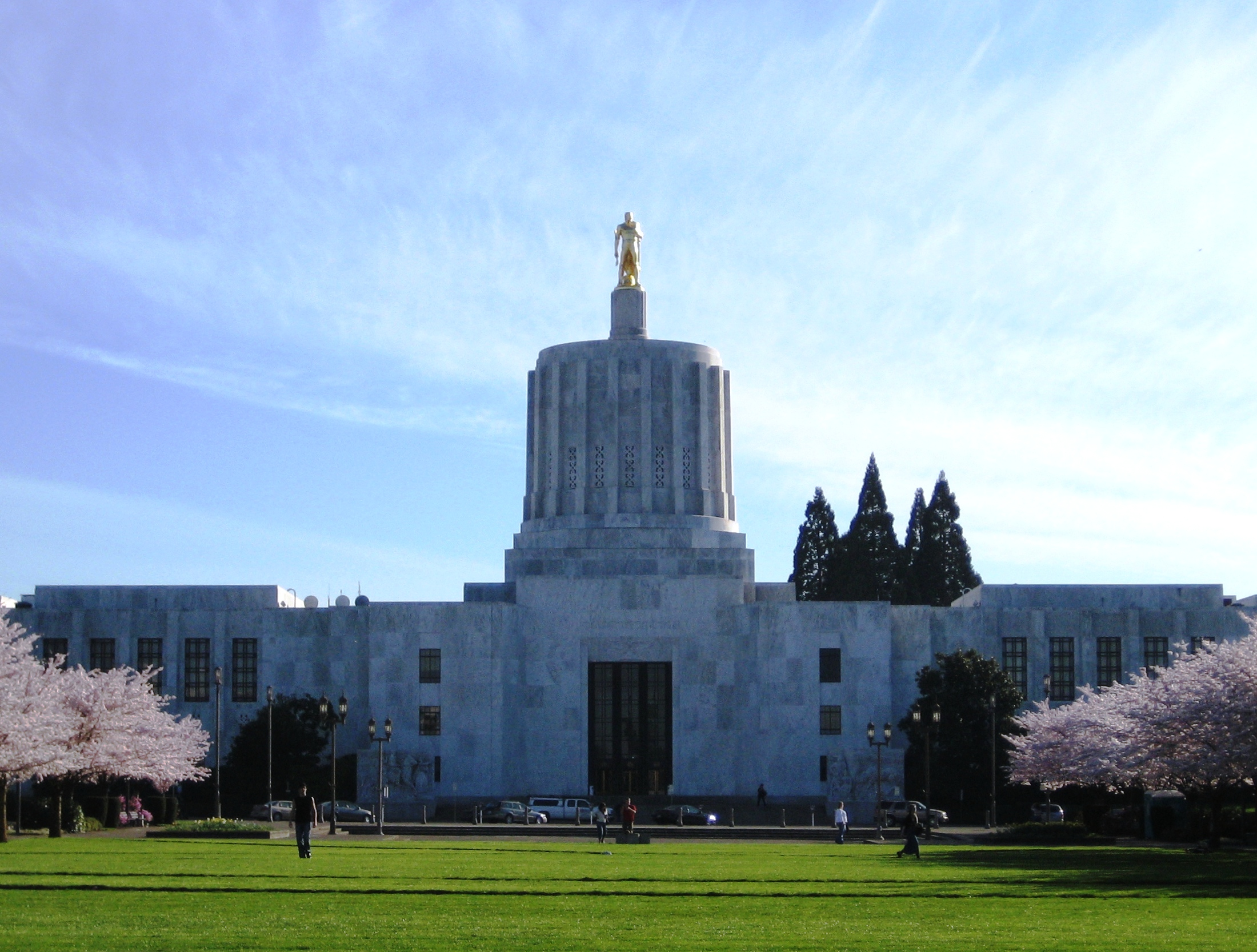
- The legislature took place in the Oregon State Capitol, seen here in 2007

Overview
- Legislative body: Oregon Legislative Assembly
- Jurisdiction: Oregon, United States
- Meeting place: Oregon State Capitol
- Term: 1947
- Website: www.oregonlegislature.gov

Oregon State Senate
- Members: 29 Senators
- Senate President: Marshall E. Cornett
- Party control: Republican Party of Oregon

Oregon House of Representatives
- Members: 60 Representatives
- Speaker of the House: John Hubert Hall
- Party control: Republican Party of Oregon

The Forty-fourth Oregon Legislative Assembly convened in 1947 for its regular biennial session, from January 13 to April 5, at the Oregon State Capitol in Salem. Republicans held overwhelming majorities over the Democrats in both the Senate (25–5) and the House of Representatives (58–2). The body held no special sessions. The Senate President was Marshall E. Cornett (R–17 Klamath Falls) and the Speaker of the House was John Hubert Hall (R–5 Portland).

On 1947-10-28, Cornett died in a plane crash near Lakeview, Oregon, along with governor Earl Snell and secretary of state Robert S. Farrell, Jr. Because the House speaker is in the gubernatorial line of succession after the secretary of state and Senate president, Hall ascended to the governorship and completed Snell's term.

== Senate ==
Affiliation	Members
Democratic	5
Republican	24
Total	29
Government Majority	19

== Senate Members ==
Composition of the Senate
Senator	Residence	Party
W. W. Balderree	Grants Pass	Republican
Howard Belton	Canby	Republican
Allan G. Carson	Salem	Republican
Truman A. Chase	Eugene	Republican
Merle R. Chessman	Astoria	Republican
Marshall E. Cornett †	Klamath Falls	Republican
Austin Dunn	Baker	Democratic
Rex Ellis	Pendleton	Republican
Carl Engdahl	Pendleton	Republican
Ernest R. Fatland	Condon	Republican
Angus Gibson	Junction City	Republican
Frank H. Hilton	Portland	Republican
James N. Jones	Juntura	Republican
J. J. Lynch	Portland	Republican
Thomas R. Mahoney	Portland	Democratic
Eugene E. Marsh	McMinnville	Republican
Douglas McKay	Salem	Republican
Earl T. Newbry	Ashland	Republican
Thomas Parkinson	Roseburg	Republican
Lee Patterson	Portland	Republican
Walter J. Pearson	Portland	Democratic
Irving Rand	Portland	Republican
Peter J. Stadelman	The Dalles	Republican
Orval N. Thompson	Albany	Democratic
Dean Walker	Independence	Republican
Lew Wallace	Portland	Democratic
William Walsh	Coos Bay	Republican
George P. Winslow	Tillamook	Republican
Charles H. Zurcher	Enterprise	Republican

† Signifies the Senator died in office

== House ==
Affiliation	Members
Democratic	2
Republican	58
Total	60
Government Majority	56

== House Members ==
Composition of the House
House Member	Residence	Party
Fred W. Adams	Gold Beach	Republican
Alex G. Barry	Portland	Republican
John M. Bates	Lake Grove	Republican
O. H. Bengtson	Medford	Republican
J. E. Bennett	Portland	Republican
R. H. C. Bennett	Dundee	Republican
Robert A. Bennett	Portland	Republican
W. W. Chadwick	Salem	Republican
Herman H. Chindgren	Molalla	Republican
E. H. Condit	Westport	Republican
F. H. Dammasch	Portland	Republican
John Dickson	Portland	Republican
Frank A. Doerfler	Salem	Republican
Robert E. Duniway	Portland	Republican
Colon R. Eberhard	La Grande	Republican
Anna M. Ellis	Garibaldi	Republican
Carl H. Francis	Dayton	Republican
Giles L. French	Moro	Republican
R. C. Frisbie	Baker	Republican
Martin P. Gallagher	Ontario	Republican
John F. Gantenbein	Portland	Republican
Robert C. Gile	Roseburg	Republican
J. S. Greenwood	Wemme	Republican
John Hubert Hall	Portland	Republican
Joseph E. Harvey	Portland	Republican
Donald E. Heisler	The Dalles	Republican
Fred A. Hellberg	Astoria	Republican
Herman P. Hendershott	Eugene	Republican
Paul Hendricks	Salem	Republican
Carl C. Hill	Days Creek	Republican
Earl H. Hill	Cushman	Republican
Paul W. Houston	Oregon City	Republican
Earle Johnson	Corvallis	Republican
J. O. Johnson	Portland	Republican
E. W. Kimberling	Prairie City	Republican
E. Riddell Lage	Hood River	Republican
M. M. Landon	Sweet Home	Republican
C. L. Lieuallen	Pendleton	Republican
Art W. Lindberg	Pendleton	Republican
Pat Lonergan	Portland	Republican
Kenneth W. McKenzie	Wallowa	Republican
Ralph T. Moore	Coos Bay	Republican
William B. Morse	Prineville	Republican
William Niskanen	Bend	Republican
Henry E. Peterson	Ione	Republican
Stanhope S. Pier	Portland	Republican
Rose M. Poole	Klamath Falls	Republican
Harry Schmeltzer	Sherwood	Republican
Henry Semon	Klamath Falls	Democratic
John R. Snellstrom	Eugene	Republican
Burt K. Snyder	Lakeview	Republican
Lyle D. Thomas	Dallas	Republican
Frank J. Van Dyke	Medford	Republican
Harvey Wells	Portland	Republican
Marie E. Wilcox	Grants Pass	Republican
Harry R. Wiley	Lebanon	Republican
Rudie Wilhelm	Portland	Republican
Joe Wilson	Newport	Republican
Manley J. Wilson	Warren	Democratic
Douglas R. Yeater	Salem	Republican

† Signifies the Representative died in office

== See also ==
- Oregon State Senate
- Government of Oregon
