= Beechcraft Bonanza =

Single engine American light aircraft

Bonanza
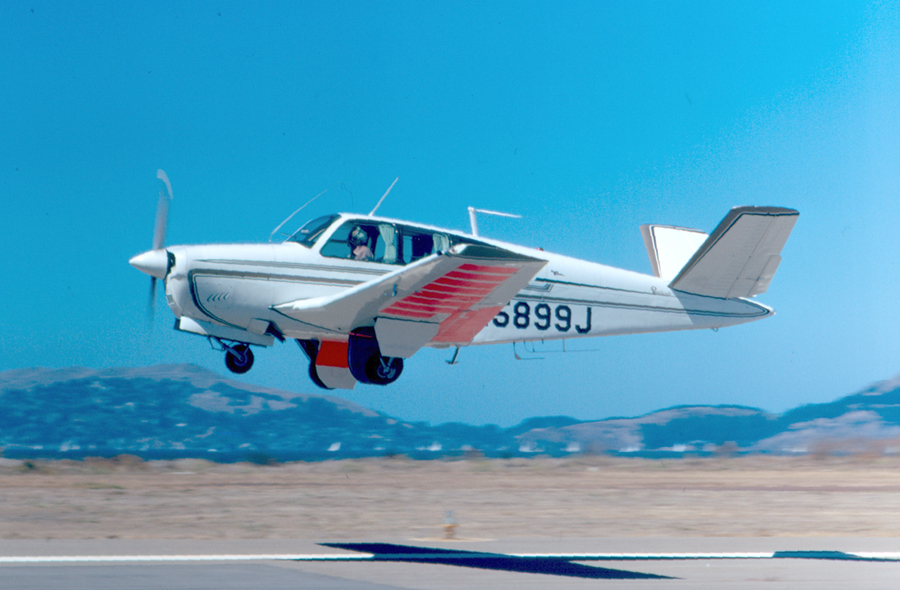
- Beech S35 Bonanza

General information
- Type: Civil utility aircraft
- National origin: United States
- Manufacturer: Beechcraft
- Status: In service
- Number built: 18,525 (at end of 2025)

History
- Manufactured: 1947–present
- Introduction date: 1947
- First flight: December 22, 1945
- Variant: Beechcraft QU-22 Pave Eagle
- Developed into: Beechcraft T-34 Mentor; Beechcraft Travel Air; Bay Super V Fuji KM-2

The Beechcraft Bonanza is an American general aviation aircraft introduced in 1947 by Beech Aircraft Corporation of Wichita, Kansas. The four-to-six seat, single-engined aircraft has been in continuous production longer than any other aircraft in history. More than 18,000 Bonanzas of all variants, and over 6,000 twin-engined derivatives, have been built. produced in both distinctive V-tail and conventional-tail configurations; early conventional-tail versions were marketed as the Debonair.

In November 2025, Textron Aviation (the later corporate owner of Beechcraft) announced that the Bonanza and the Beechcraft Baron were ceasing production once the final backlog of orders was filled. Textron assured existing owners that parts, maintenance, and support for the Bonanza will continue to be provided.

== Design and development ==
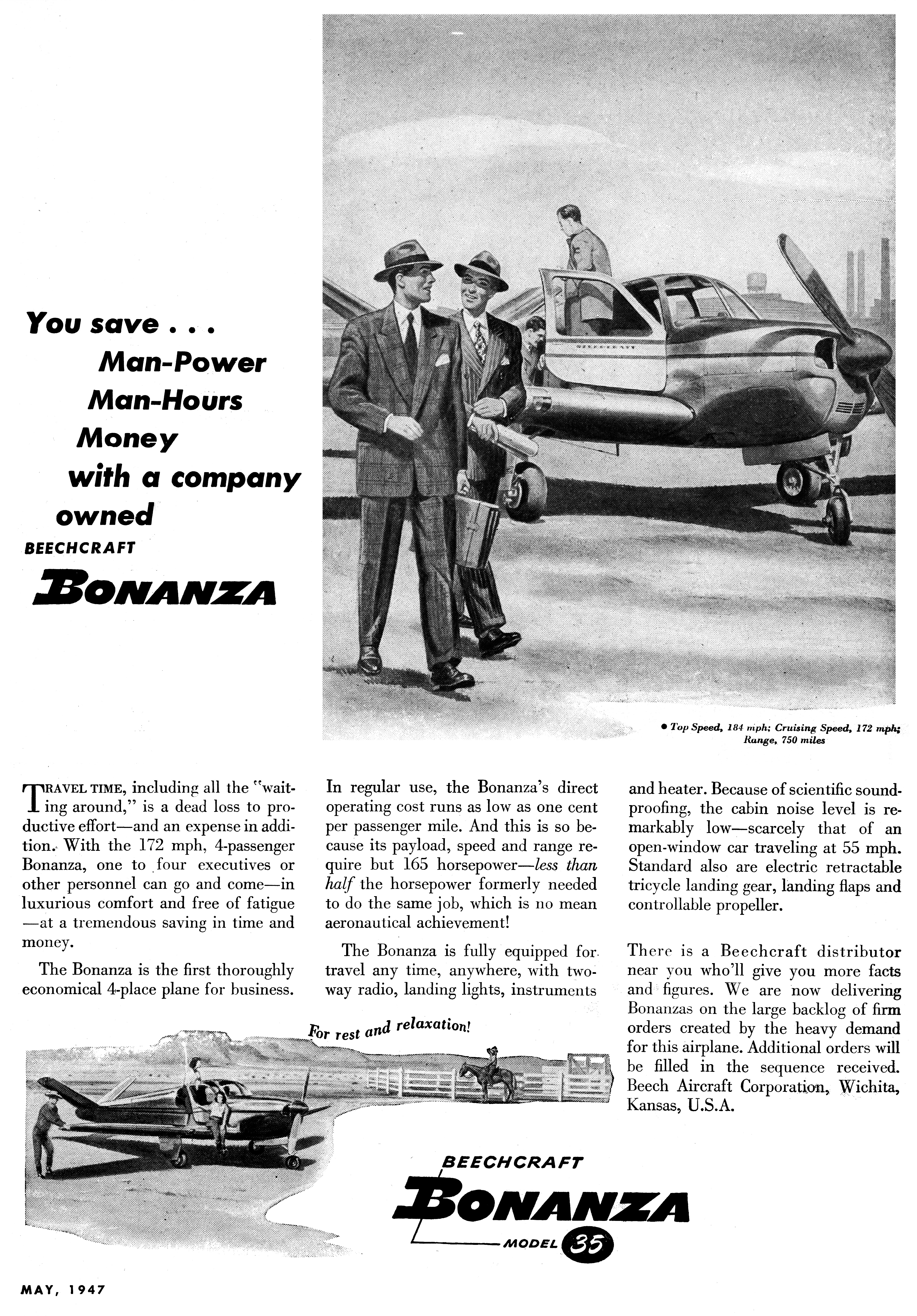
A 1947 advertisement for the first Model 35 Bonanza

At the end of World War II, two all-metal light aircraft emerged, the four-seat Model 35 Bonanza and the five-seat Cessna 195 -- both cruising up to 170 mph (270 km/h), but representing very different approaches to the premium end of the postwar civil-aviation market. The Cessna 195 -- with its high-wing, a 300 hp (220 kW), seven-cylinder radial engine, fixed tailwheel undercarriage, and roll-down side windows -- was a continuation of prewar technology. The Bonanza, however, initially featured an easier-to-manage, 185 hp (138 kW), horizontally opposed, six-cylinder engine, retractable tricycle undercarriage (although the nosewheel initially was not steerable, but castering) and low-wing configuration.

Designed by a team led by Ralph Harmon, the model 35 Bonanza was a relatively fast, low-wing, all-aluminum design, at a time when most light aircraft were still made with wood and fabric. The Model 35 featured retractable landing gear, and its signature V-tail (equipped with combination elevator-rudders called "ruddervators"). The prototype 35 Bonanza made its first flight on December 22, 1945, with the type receiving an airworthiness certificate on March 25, 1947. Production began that year. The first 30–40 Bonanzas produced had fabric-covered flaps and ailerons, after which those surfaces were covered with magnesium alloy sheet.

The Bonanza family eventually comprised three major variants:

- Model 35 Bonanza (1947–1982; V-tail)
- Model 33 Debonair or Bonanza (1960–1995; conventional tail)
- Model 36 Bonanza (1968–present; a stretched Model 33)

The Model 33 Debonair was introduced in 1960 as a lower-priced model with more austere standard instrumentation, exterior equipment, paint schemes, and interior fabrics and trim than the more prestigious V-tail Bonanza. However, most Bonanza features were available as factory options on the Debonair, and by the mid 1960s, most Debonair buyers were ordering most or all of these options. Realizing this, Beechcraft dropped the Debonair name and most of the basic and seldom-ordered standard features with the introduction of the E33 in 1968.

Despite its name, the Twin Bonanza is a substantially wider and heavier aircraft that is mostly dissimilar to the single-engined Bonanza; the only major shared parts are the front fuselage sides, windows, and main cabin door. However, the Twin Bonanza had trouble competing with the similarly capable but substantially lighter Cessna 310 and Piper PA-23, so Beechcraft used the basic Bonanza fuselage and many other Bonanza parts to create the twin-engined Travel Air, which was later developed into the Baron.

== Operational history ==
The Bonanza line gained fame as one of the first two fully modern light aircraft, along with the slower, short-lived North American Navion, and has been widely sought as a business and personal transport for the executive and professional class. Several military variants have served as trainers for the U.S. Air Force, U.S. Navy, and in other countries. It was also briefly used as a short-haul feeder airliner, at the outset of Central Airlines of Texas. First flight in December 1945 was followed by first deliveries in 1947, continuing in production, in one version or another, until the planned end of production in December 2026 -- 79 years -- making it the longest continually produced aircraft in the world, with over 18,000 produced, and over 6,000 twin-engined variants.

The conventional-tail Model 33 continued in production until 1995. Still built today is the Model 36 Bonanza, a longer-bodied, straight-tail variant of the original design, introduced in 1968. No Bonanzas were delivered in 2021, but on April 10, 2022, it was announced that production of the Bonanza G36 had restarted.

=== Accident history ===
The V-tail design gained a reputation as the "forked-tail doctor killer", due to crashes by overconfident wealthy amateur pilots, fatal accidents, and in-flight breakups. "Doctor killer" has sometimes been used to describe the conventional-tailed version as well. However, a detailed analysis by the Aircraft Owners and Pilots Association of accident records for common single-engine retractable-gear airplanes in the United States between 1982 and 1989 found that the Bonanza had a slightly lower accident rate than other types in the study. Pilot error was cited in 73% of V-tail crashes and 83% of conventional-tail crashes, with aircraft-related causes accounting for 15% and 11% of crashes respectively. However, the study noted that the aircraft had an unusually high incidence of gear-up landings and inadvertent landing gear retractions on the ground, which were attributed to a non-standard gear-retraction switch on early models that is easily confused with the switch that operates the flaps. Models starting in 1984 use a more distinctive relocated landing-gear switch, augmented by "squat switches" in the landing gear that prevent its operation while compressed by the aircraft's weight, and a throttle position switch that prevents gear retraction at low engine power settings.

In 1982, the production of the V-tail Model 35 ended. In the late 1980s, repeated V-tail structural failures prompted the United States Department of Transportation and Federal Aviation Administration (FAA) to conduct extensive wind tunnel and flight tests, which proved that the V-tail did not meet type certification standards under certain conditions; the effort culminated with the issuance of an airworthiness directive to strengthen the tail, which significantly reduced the incidence of in-flight breakups. Despite this, Beech has long contended that most V-tail failures involve operations well beyond the aircraft's intended flight envelope. Subsequent analysis of National Transportation Safety Board (NTSB) accident records between 1962 and 2007 revealed an average of three V-tail structural failures per year, while the conventional-tailed Bonanza 33 and 36 suffered only eleven such failures in total during the same 45 years. Most V-tail failures involved flight under visual flight rules into instrument meteorological conditions, flight into thunderstorms, or airframe icing.

In addition to the structural issues, the Bonanza 35 has a relatively narrow center of gravity envelope, and the tail design is intolerant of imbalances caused by damage, improper maintenance, or repainting. Such imbalances may induce dangerous aeroelastic flutter. Due to the anodic properties of the magnesium used for the V-tail ruddervator skins, they tend to corrode, often resulting in permanent grounding of affected aircraft because the problem can only be fixed by complete replacement of the skins or the entire empennage, and the required parts are no longer available. The American Bonanza Society has issued a reward of $500,000 to encourage the development of aftermarket replacement skins under a supplemental type certificate. Despite these issues, many Bonanza 35 owners insist that the aircraft is reasonably safe, and its reputation has resulted in reduced purchase costs for budget-conscious buyers.

In January 2012, the Australian Civil Aviation Safety Authority issued an airworthiness directive grounding all Bonanzas, Twin Bonanzas, and Debonairs equipped with a single pole-style yoke and that have forwarded elevator control cables that are more than 15 years old until they could be inspected. The AD was issued based on two aircraft found to have frayed cables, one of which suffered a cable failure just prior to takeoff, and resulting concerns about the age of the cables in fleet aircraft of this age. At the time of the grounding, some Bonanzas had reached 64 years in service. Aircraft with frayed cables were grounded until the cables were replaced, and those that passed inspection were required to have their cables replaced within 60 days regardless. The AD affected only Australian aircraft and was not adopted by the airworthiness authority responsible for the type certificate, the US Federal Aviation Administration. The FAA instead opted to issue a Special Airworthiness Information Bulletin requesting that the elevator control cables be inspected during the annual inspection.

=== T-34 Mentor ===
Several military variants saw service, particularly the Beech T-34 Mentor, which became the principal primary trainer for the U.S. Air Force in the 1950s, and for the U.S. Navy since the 1950s. It was also used by various countries abroad.

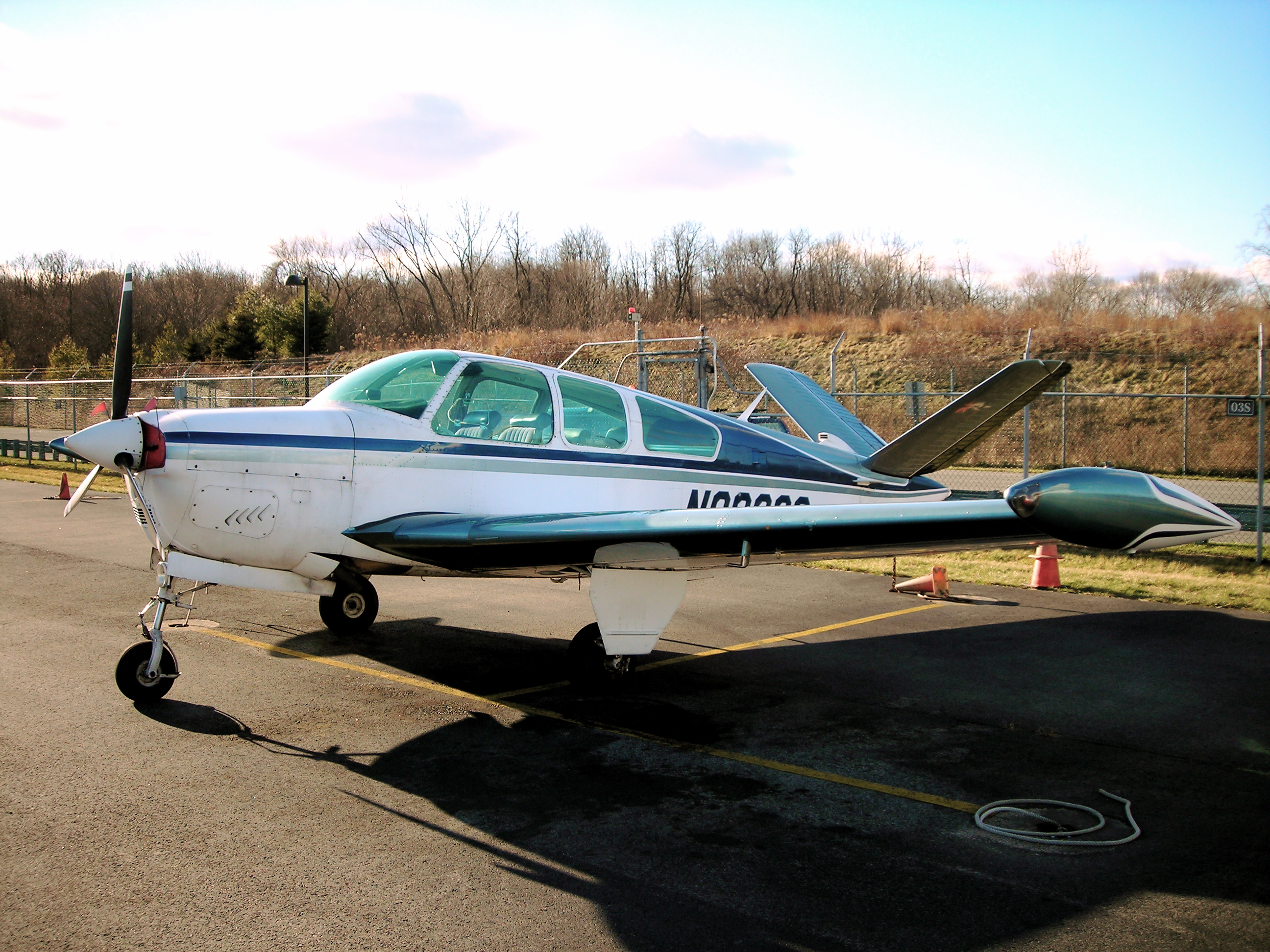
1965 S35 V-tailed Bonanza

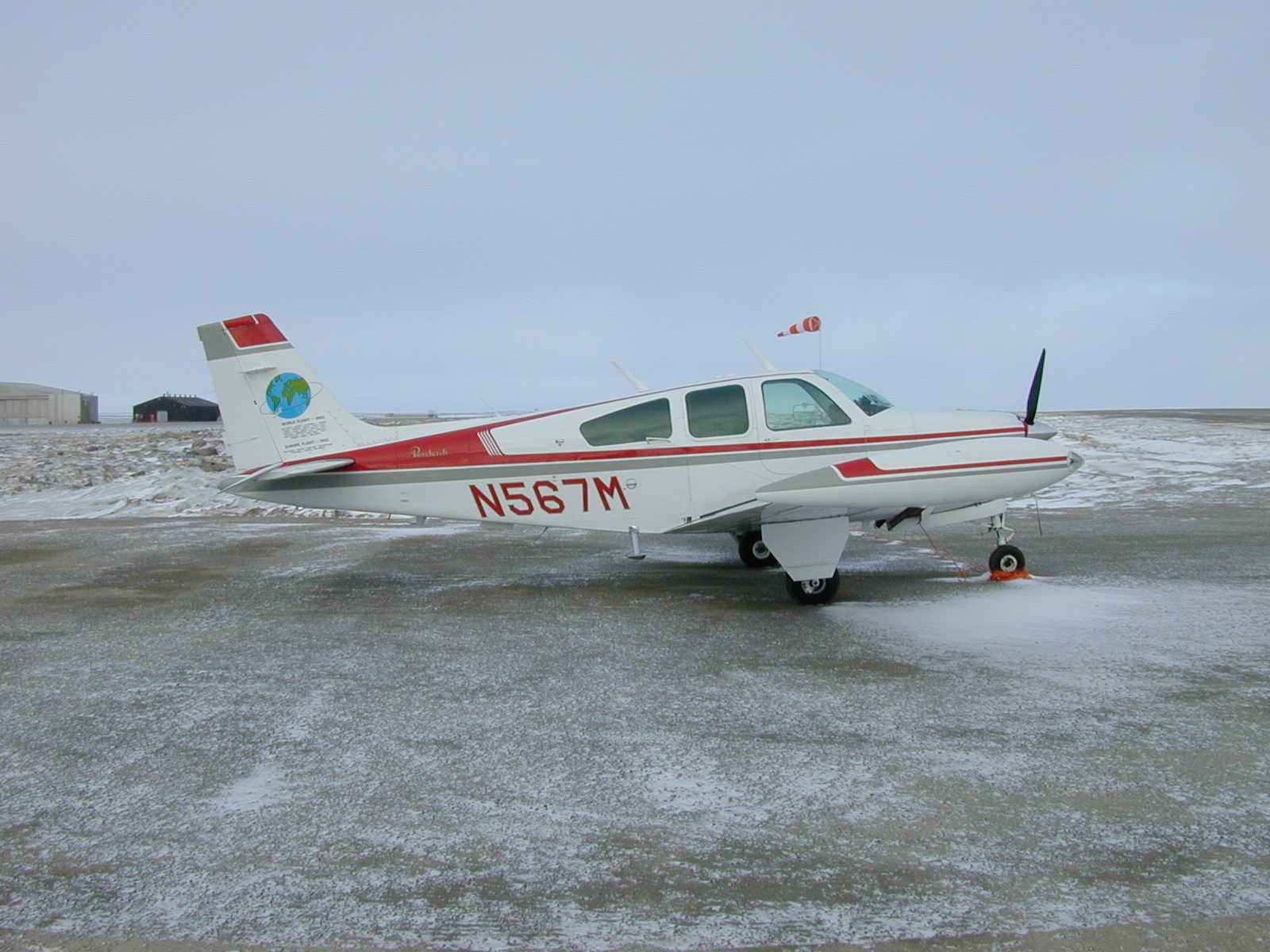
BE33 (N567M) at Cambridge Bay Airport Nunavut, Canada

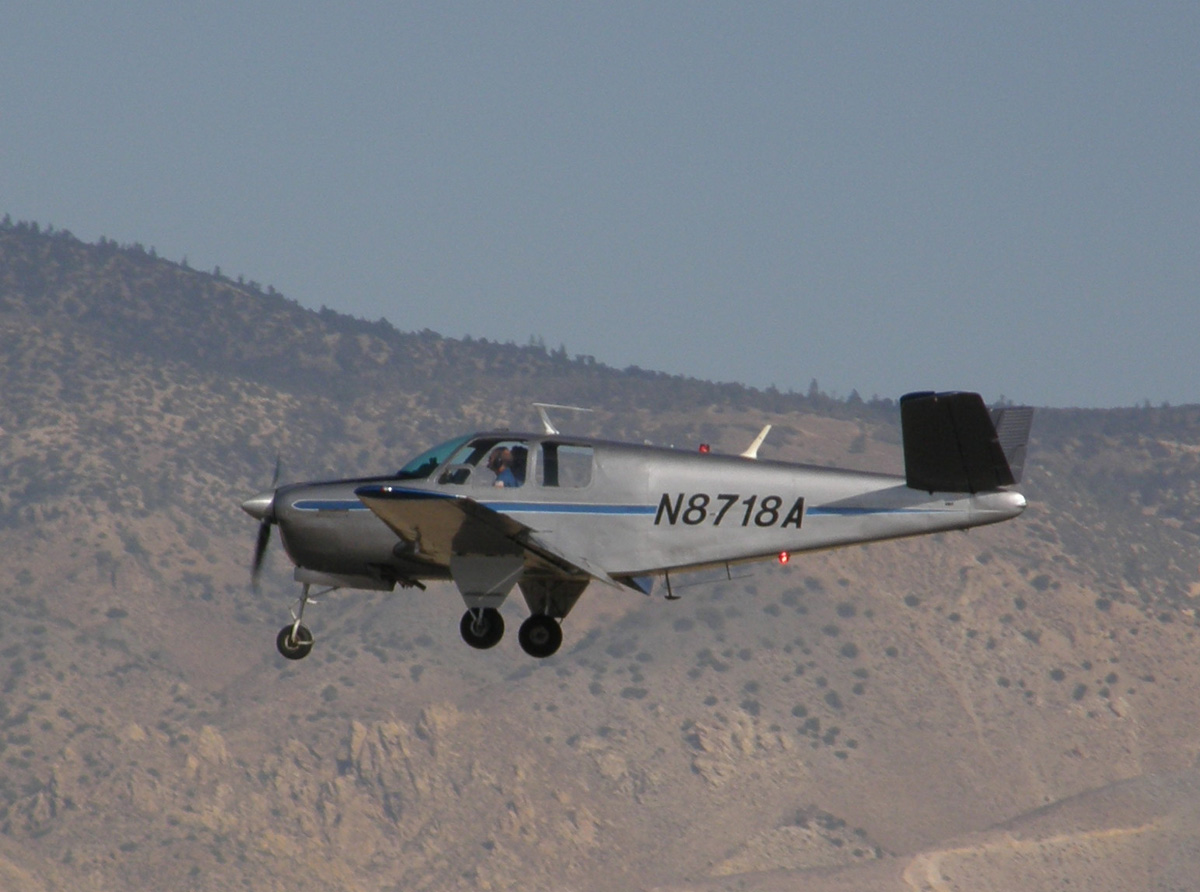
A 1950 B35 operated by the National Test Pilot School at the Mojave Airport

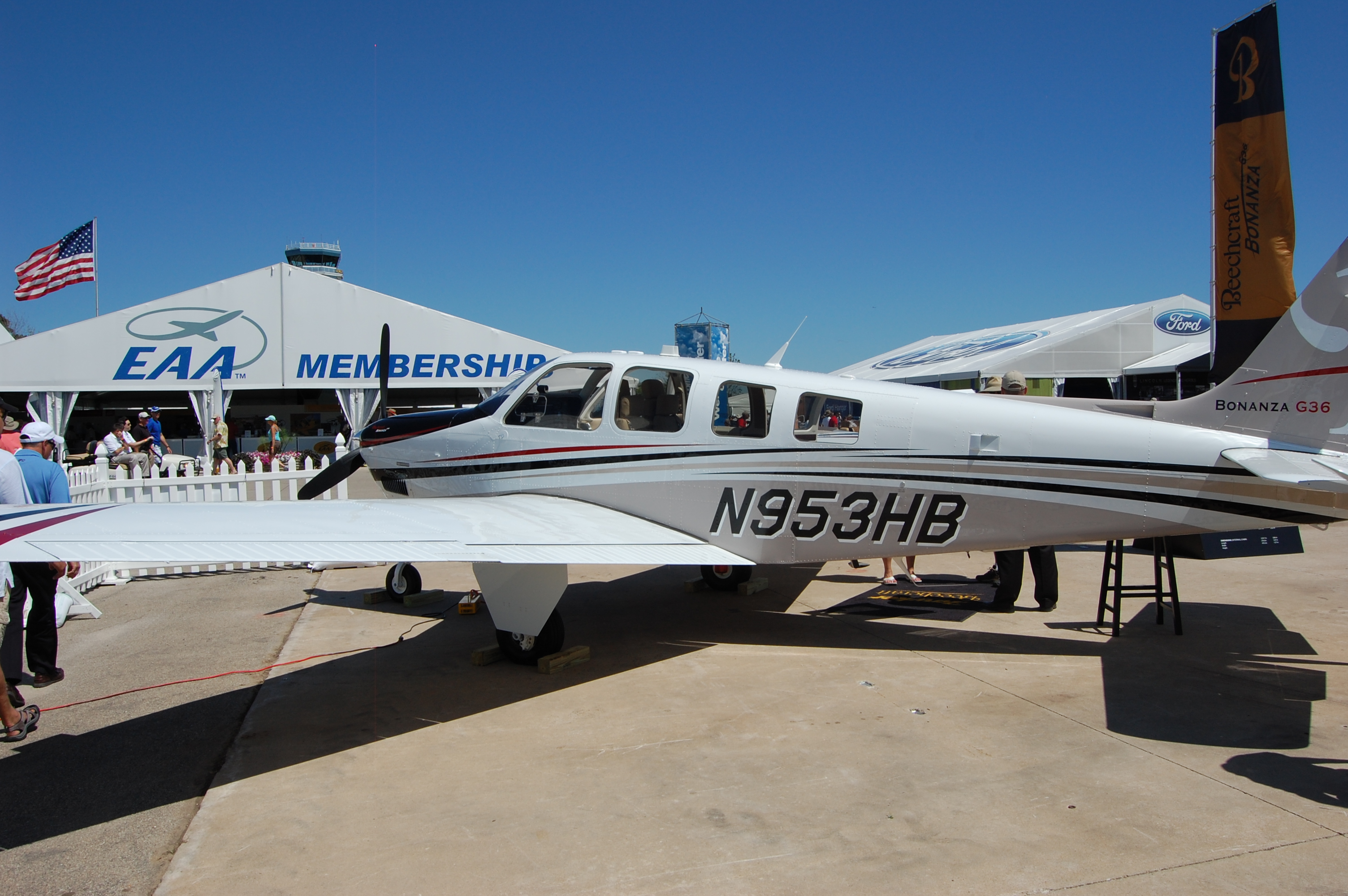
A brand-new 2011 Bonanza G36 at the Beechcraft display; EAA AirVenture 2011

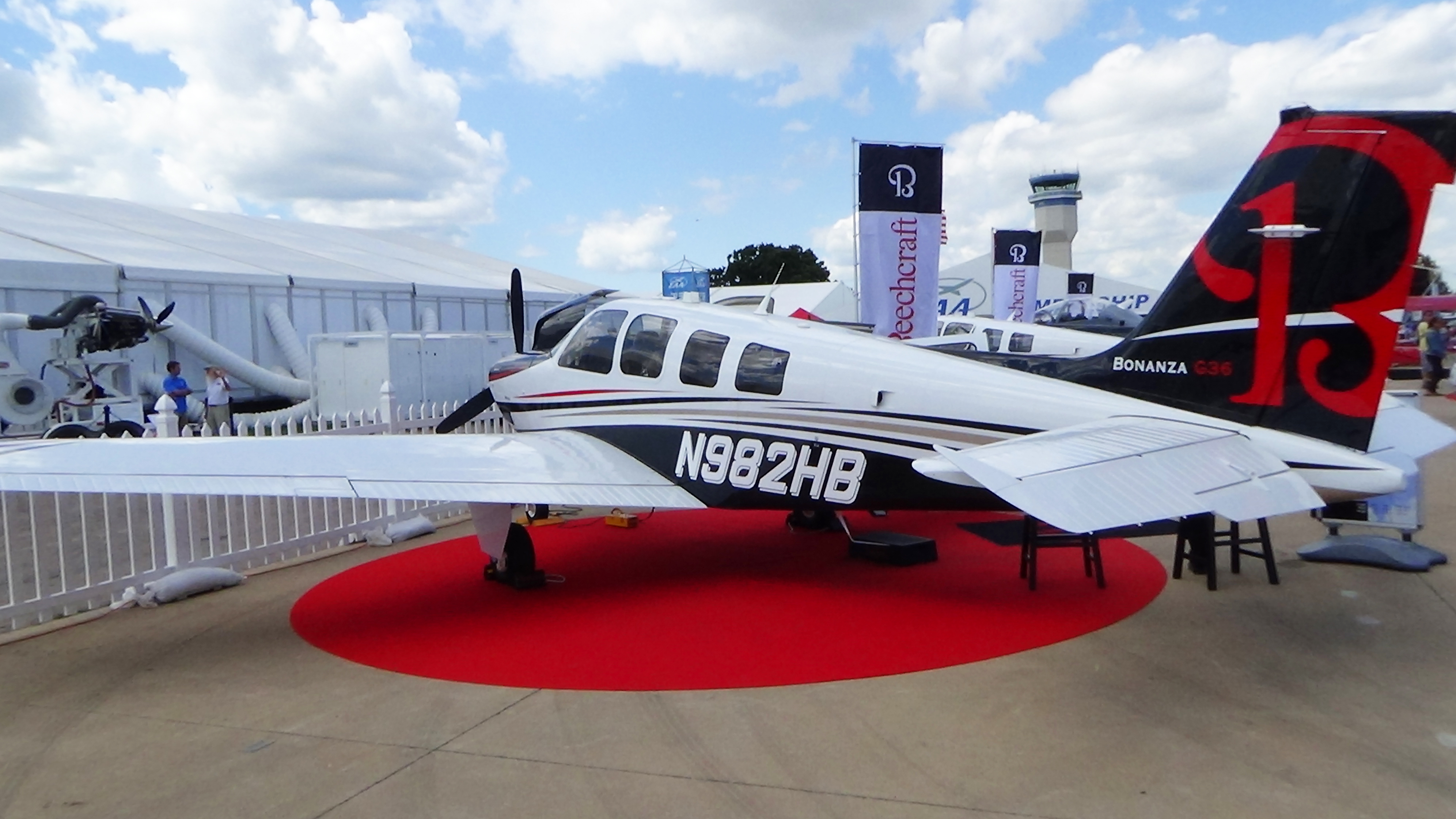
2013 Bonanza G36 at AirVenture 2013

== Variants ==
=== Model 35 Bonanza ===
35
(1947–1948), initial production version with 165 hp (123 kW) Continental E-185 or E-185-1 engine, five prototypes and 1,500 production aircraft built.
A35
(1949) Model 35 with higher takeoff weight, tubular wing spars and nosewheel steering, 701 built.
B35
(1950) A35 with a Continental E-185-8 engine, 480 built.
C35
(1950-1952) B35 with a 185 hp (138 kW) Continental E-185-11 engine, metal propeller, larger tail surfaces, and higher takeoff weight, approved for the Lycoming GO-435-D1 engine, 719 built.
35R
(1951) Remanufactured Model 35 with many of the improvements introduced on the B35 and C35, meant as an alternative to new C35 production as the latter suffered from delays due to the Korean War. 14 Model 35s were modified to this standard, with each having the suffix "R1" through "R14" appended to their original serial numbers.
D35
(1953) C35 with increased takeoff weight and minor changes, approved for the Lycoming GO-435-D1 engine. 298 built.
E35
(1954) Powered by E-185-11 or 225 hp (168 kW) Continental E-225-8 engine, 301 built.
F35
(1955) Powered by E-185-11 or E-225-8 engine. Extra rear window each side, strengthened wing leading edges and tail spar caps. 392 built.
G35
(1956) Powered by Continental E-225-8 engine, thicker windshield. 476 built.
H35

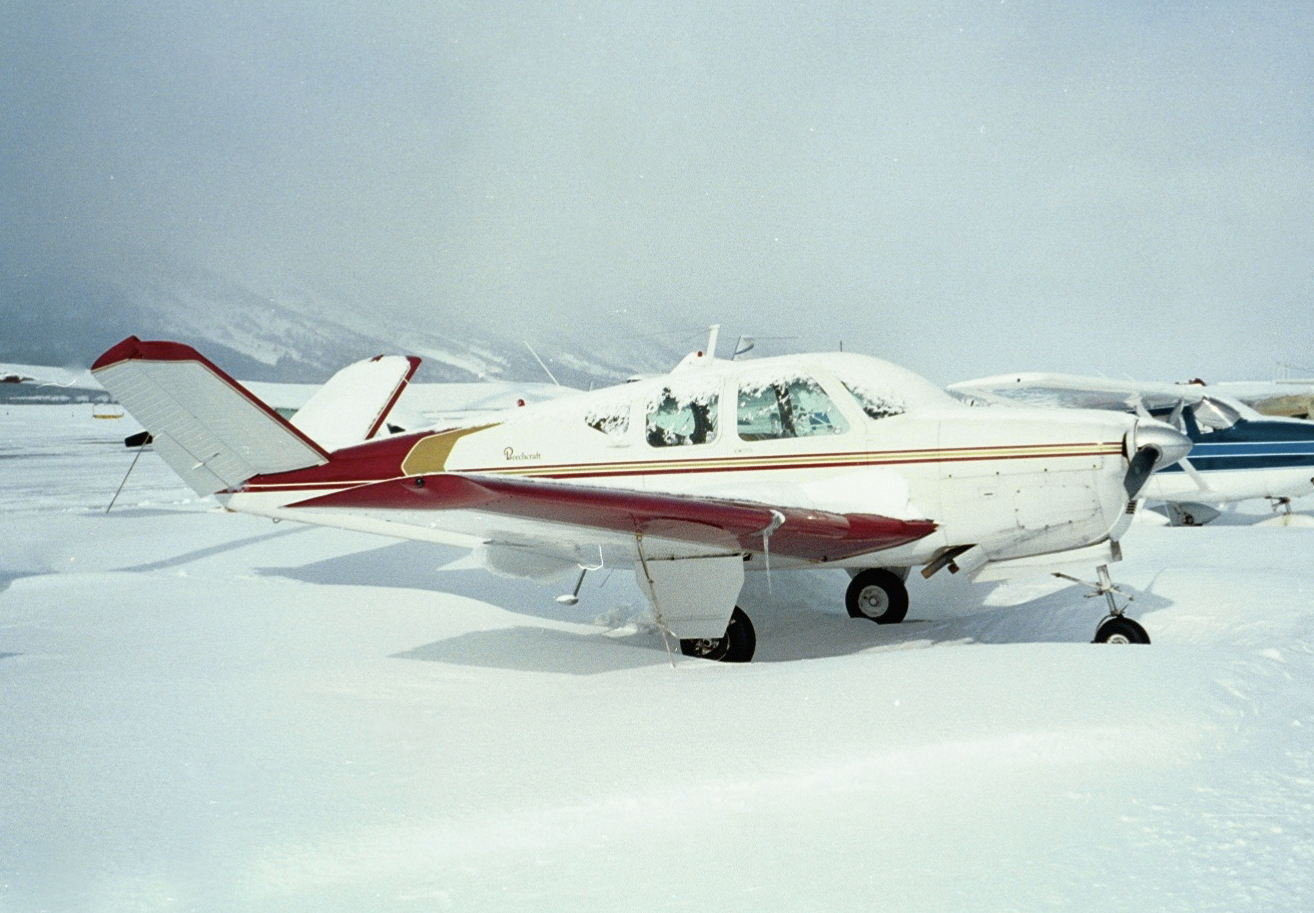
1957 Model H35 at Jackson Hole Airport

(1957) Powered by a 240 hp (180 kW) Continental O-470-G engine, and with modified structure. 464 built.
J35
(1958) Powered by a 250 hp (190 kW) fuel injected Continental IO-470-C engine. 396 built.
K35
(1959) Increased fuel load, optional fifth seat and increased takeoff weight, 436 built.
M35
(1960) Similar to K35, 400 built.

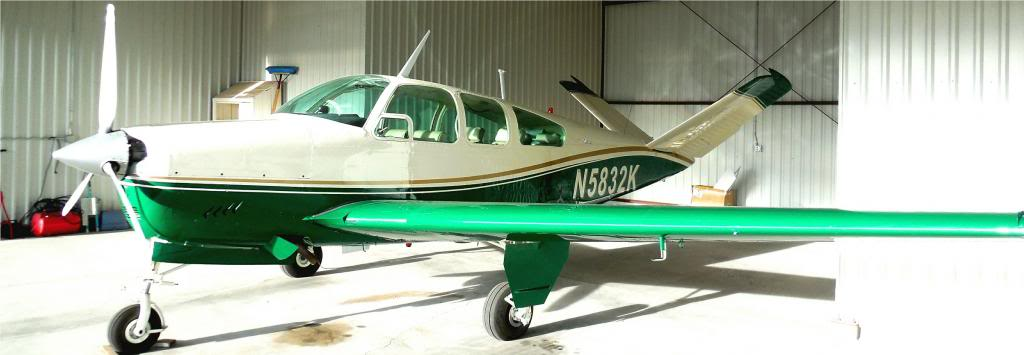
1965 S35 at Flagstaff Pulliam Airport

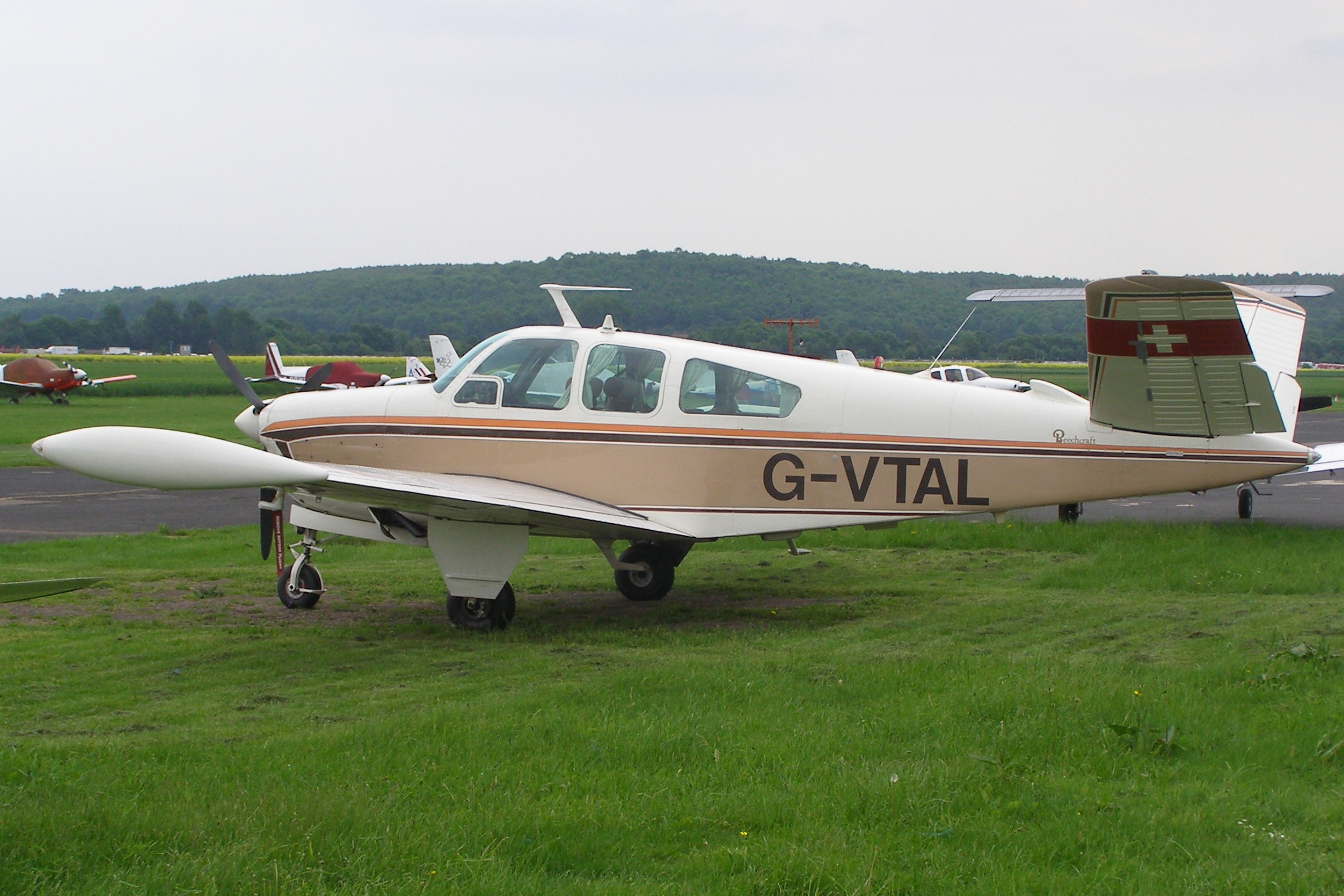
1966 V35

N35
(1961) Powered by a 260 hp (190 kW) Continental IO-470-N engine, increased fuel capacity, increased takeoff weight, and larger rear side windows, 280 built.
O35
(1961) Experimental version fitted with laminar flow airfoil. Only one built.
P35
(1962–1963) New instrument panel. 467 built.
S35
(1964–1966) Powered by Continental IO-520-B engine, higher takeoff weight, longer cabin interior, optional fifth and sixth seat and new rear window, 667 built.
V35
(1966–1967) Fitted with single-piece windshield, powered by IO-520-B or optional 285 hp (213 kW) turbocharged TSIO-520-D engine (as V35-TC). 873 built, including 79 V35-TCs.
V35A
(1968–1969) Fitted with revised windshield, powered by IO-520-B or by optional turbocharged TSIO-520-D engine (as V35A-TC), 470 built, including 46 V35A-TCs.
V35B
(1970–1982) Initially with minor improvements over V35A, but had major internal redesign in 1972, and 24-volt electrical system in 1978. Normally powered by IO-520B, but available with optional TSIO-520-D (as V35TC) until 1971. 1335 built, including 7 V35TCs.
UC-35
Brazilian Air Force designation of the A35 Bonanza.
B.S.5
(Thai: บ.ส.๕) Royal Thai Armed Forces designation for the M35 Bonanza.

=== Model 33 Debonair/Bonanza ===
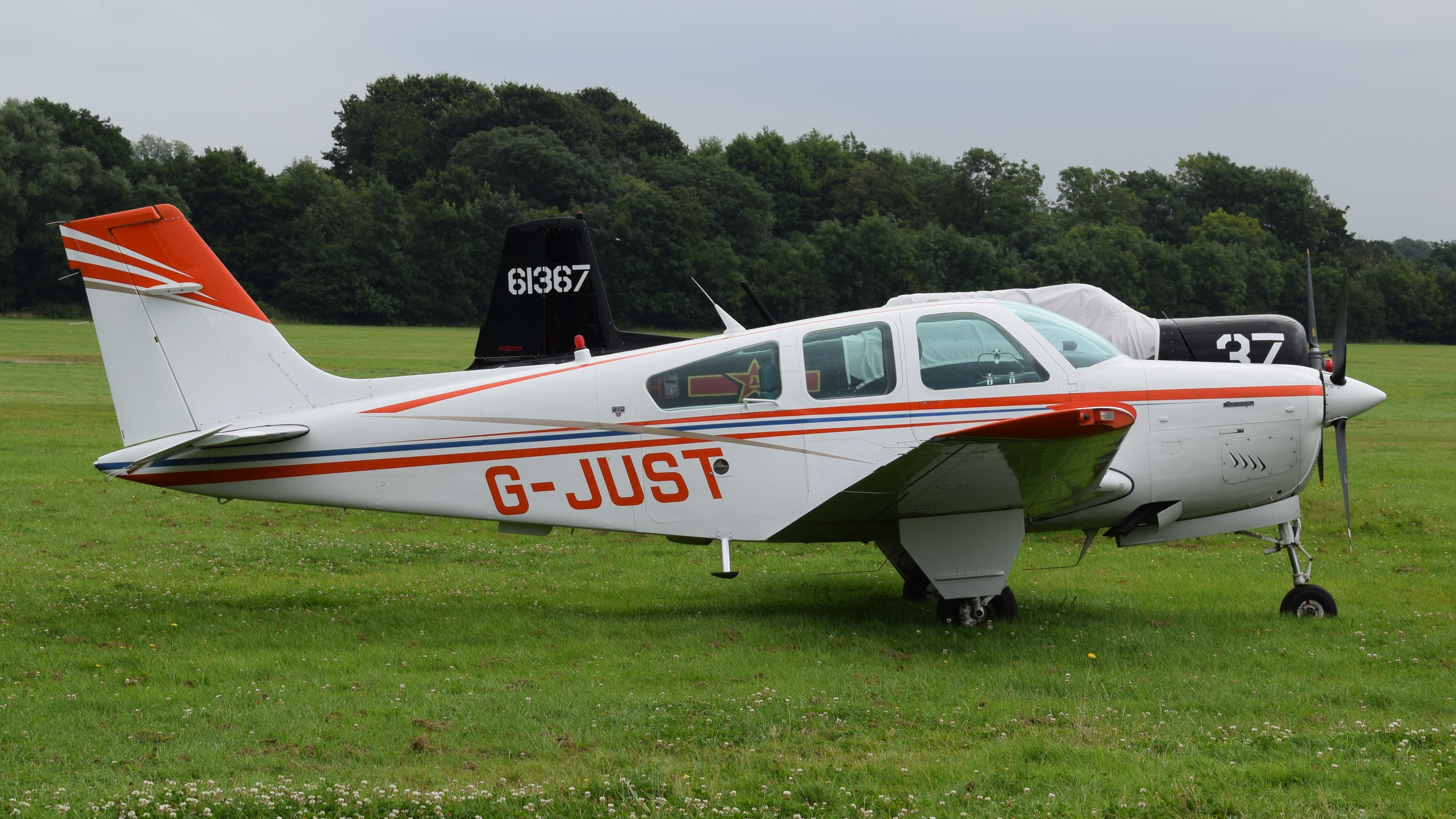
1987 Bonanza F33A

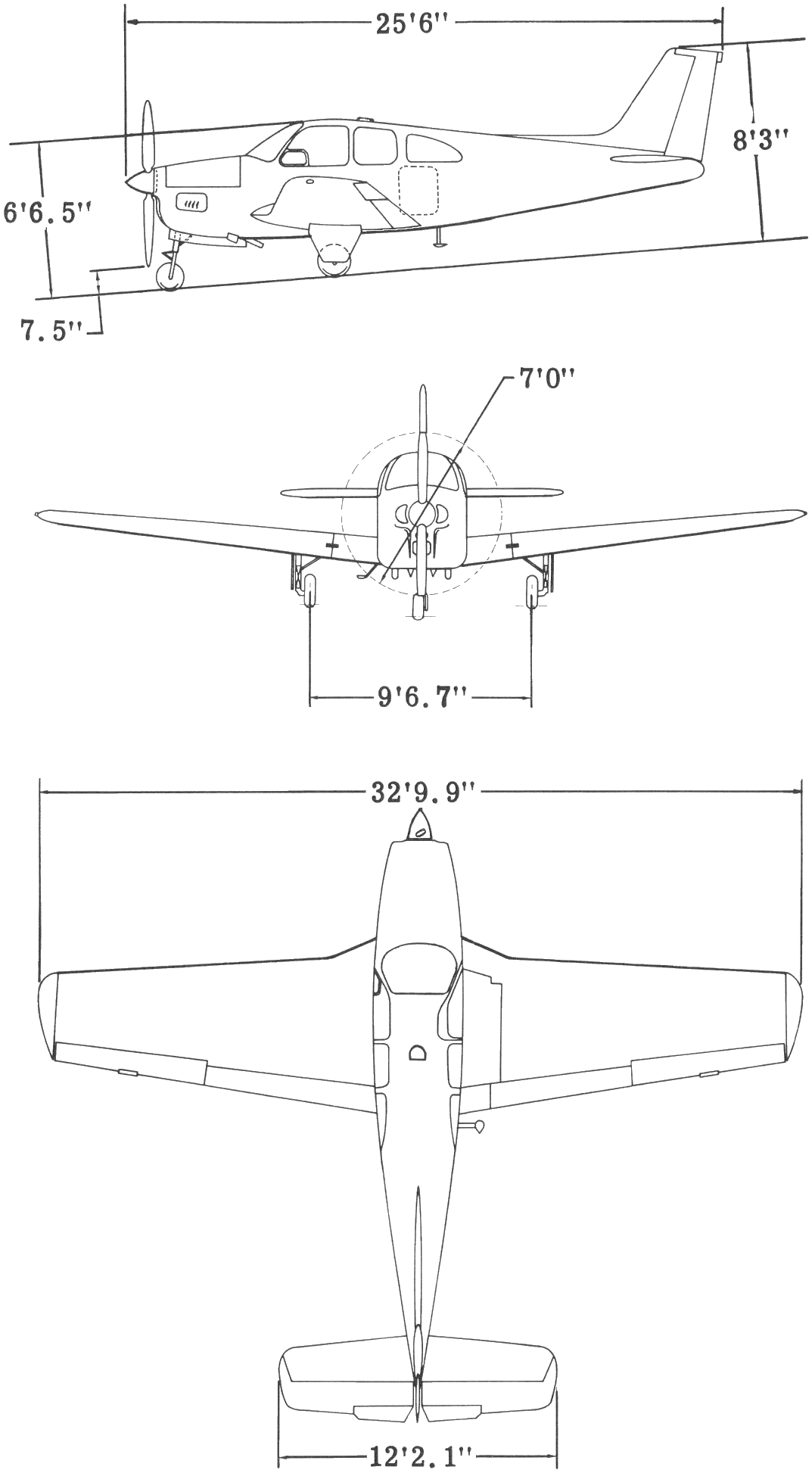
A 3-view line drawing of an E33

35-33 Debonair
(1959) Based on Bonanza with conventional fin and tailplane, and basic trim and interior, powered by one 225 hp (168 kW) Continental IO-470-J, 233 built. First flown on 14 September 1959.
35-A33 Debonair
(1961) Fitted with improved interior trim, and powered by IO-470J or IO-470K. 154 built.
B33 Debonair
(1961-1965) Further refined version, with new instrument panel, contoured fin leading edge and fuel tank modifications (as per N35 Bonanza). IO-470K engine. 426 built.
C33 Debonair
(1965-1967) Higher gross weight and provision for enlarged rear windows. 304 built.
C33A Debonair
(1966-1967) Powered by 285 hp (213 kW) Continental IO-520-B engine. 179 built.
D33
One S35 modified as a military close-support prototype, with conventional tail assembly and six underwing hardpoints.
E33 Bonanza
(1968-1969) Powered by 225 hp (168 kW) IO-470K. 116 built.
E33A Bonanza
(1968-1969) E33 with a 285 hp (213 kW) Continental IO-520-B engine, 85 built.
E33B Bonanza
E33 with strengthened airframe and certified for aerobatics. Unbuilt.
E33C Bonanza
(1968-1969) E33B with a 285 hp (213 kW) Continental IO-520-B engine, 25 built.. First model certified for aerobatics.
F33 Bonanza
(1970) E33 with modified rear side windows and minor improvements, 20 built
F33A Bonanza
(1970-1994) F33 with a 285 hp (213 kW) Continental IO-520-B engine, later aircraft have a longer S35/V35 cabin and extra seats, 1502 built.

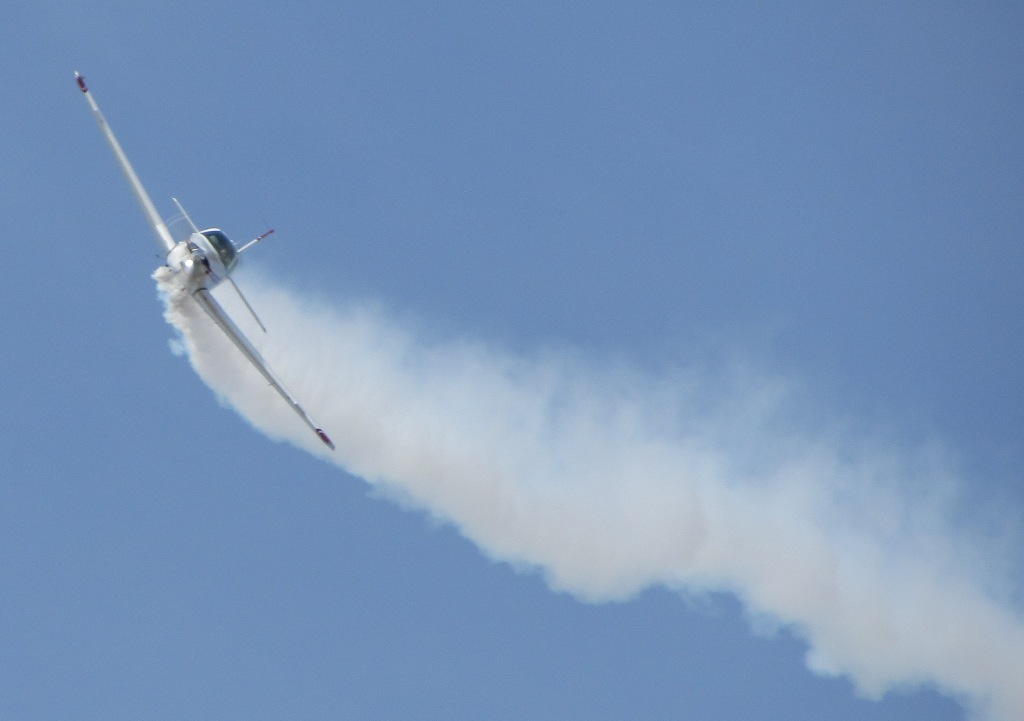
Beechcraft F33C with smoke system performing an aerobatic routine

F33C Bonanza
(1970 onwards) F33A certified for aerobatics, 154 built on special order up to 1987
G33 Bonanza
(1972-1973) F33 with a 260 hp (190 kW) Continental IO-470-N engine and V35B trim, 50 built.

=== Model 36 Bonanza ===
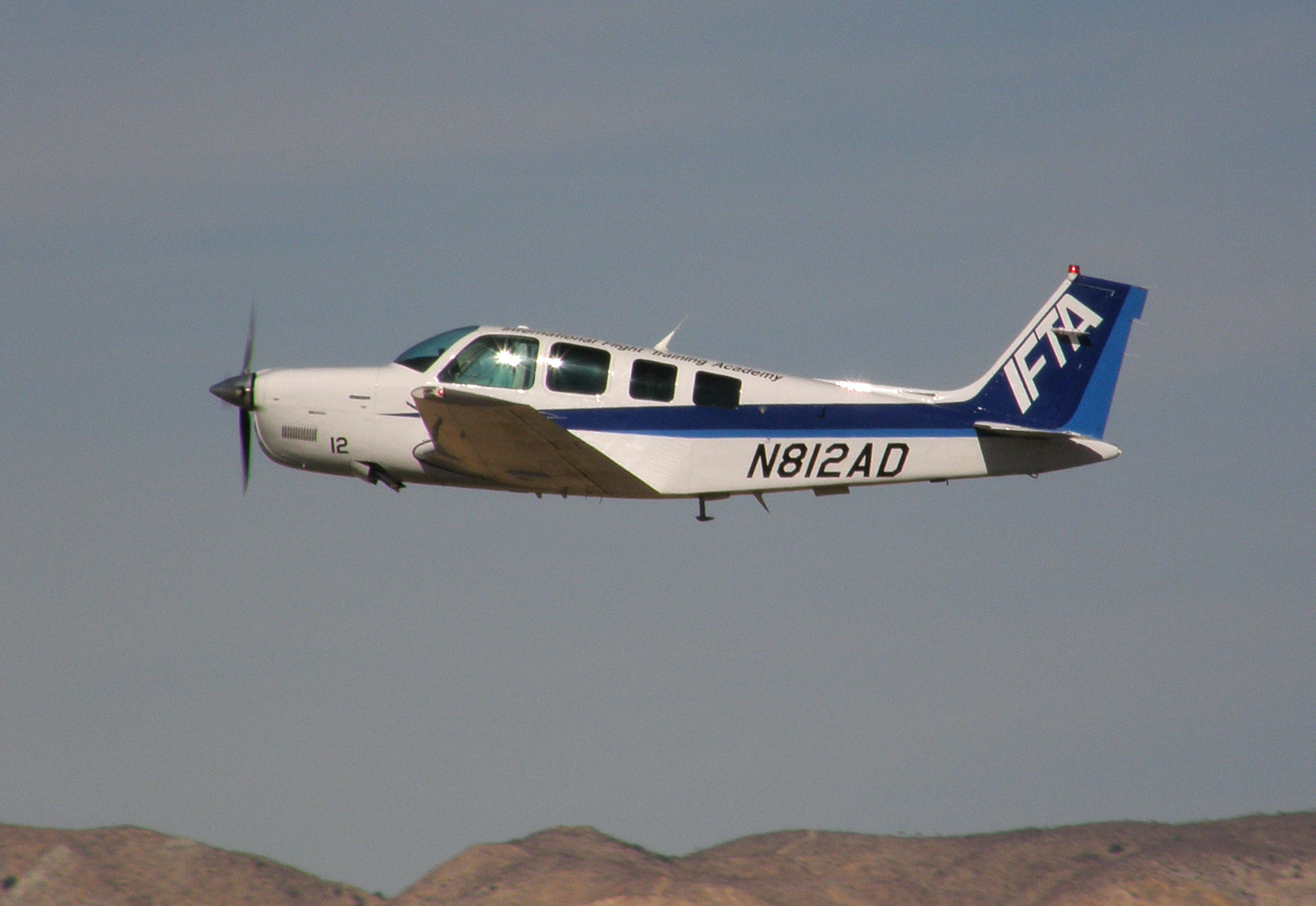
A36 Bonanza

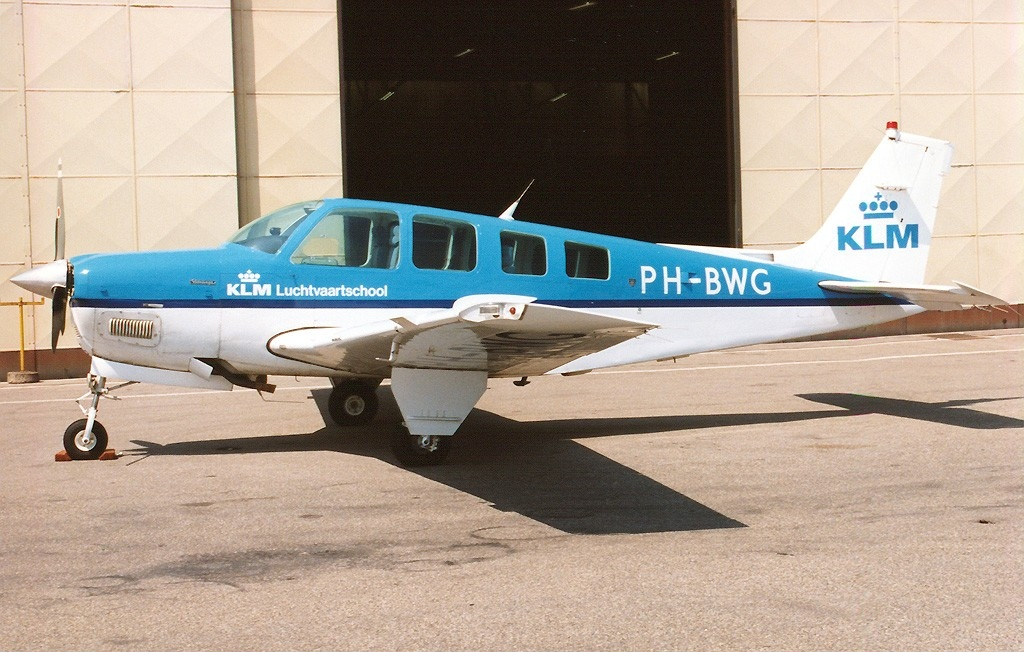
A36AT Bonanza of KLM Flight Academy with exhaust baffles under the nose.

36
(1968–1969) Revised utility aircraft with similar tail to Model 33 with a 10 in (25 cm) fuselage stretch, four cabin windows each side, starboard rear double doors and seats for six, one 285 hp (213 kW) Continental IO-520-B engine, 184 built.
A36
(1970–2005) Model 36 with improved deluxe interior, a new fuel system, higher takeoff weight, until 1984 IO-520-BA or IO-520-BB with 285 hp (213 kW), from 1984 fitted with a Continental IO-550-BB 300 hp (220 kW) engine and redesigned instrument panel and controls, 2128 built
A36AT
Model A36 "Airline Trainer" with reduced-diameter propeller, exhaust baffles, and reduced RPM to reduce noise for flight schools.
A36TC
(1979–1981) Model 36 with a three-bladed propeller and a 300 hp (220 kW) turbocharged Continental TSIO-520-UB engine, 280 built
T36TC
(1979) A36 fitted with T-tail and a 325 hp (242 kW) Continental TSIO-520 engine, one built
B36TC
(1982–2002) A36TC with longer span wing, increased range, redesigned instrument panel and controls, higher takeoff weight, 116 built
G36
(2006–present) – glass cockpit update of the A36 with the Garmin G1000 system

=== Model 40 ===
Model 40
The Beechcraft Model 40 was an experimental twin-engined aircraft based on the Bonanza. Only one prototype was built in 1948. It featured a unique over/under arrangement of two 180 hp (130 kW) Franklin engines mounted with one on top of the other and driving a single propeller. The plane had a different engine cowl from a standard Bonanza, and the nose gear could not fully retract, but otherwise it greatly resembled the production Bonanzas of the time. Certification rules demanded a firewall be fitted between the two engines, however, thus stopping development. The FAA registration of the Model 40 was canceled on January 26, 1951.

=== Modifications ===
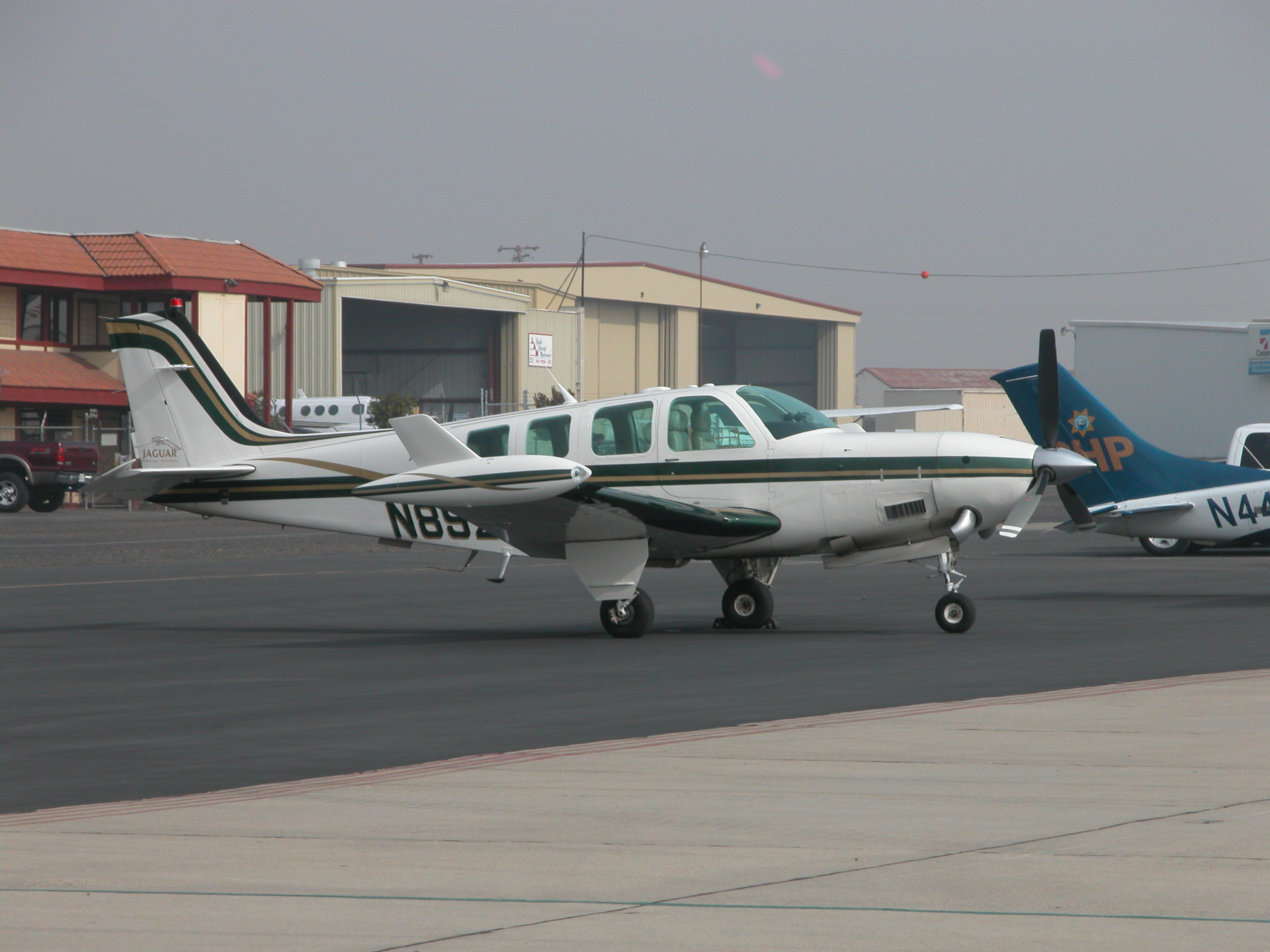
Beechcraft A36 Bonanza modified with the Tradewind Turbine's turboprop conversion

Allison Turbine Bonanza
Allison, in conjunction with Soloy Aviation Solutions, certified a conversion of Beech A36 Bonanza aircraft to be powered by an Allison 250-B17C turboprop engine.
Continental Voyager Bonanza (A36)
Standard aircraft with a liquid-cooled Continental Motors TSIOL-550-B engine.
Propjet Bonanza (A36)
Standard aircraft modified by Tradewind Turbines with an Allison 250-B17F/2 turboprop engine (Original STC # 3523NM by Soloy).
TurbineAir Bonanza (B36TC)
Modification by Rocket Engineering subsidiary West Pacific Air, LLC with a 500 hp (370 kW) Pratt & Whitney PT6A-21 turboprop engine and 124 U.S. gallons (470 L) fuel capacity.
Whirlwind System II Turbonormalized Bonanza (36, A36, G36)
Standard aircraft modified by Tornado Alley Turbo with a Tornado Alley Turbonormalizing (keeps power up to 20,000 ft (6,100 m)) system and approved for a 4,000 lb (1,800 kg) MTOW
Whirlwind TCP Bonanza (A36TC or B36TC)
Standard aircraft modified by Tornado Alley Turbo with a TCM IO-550B engine and Tornado Alley Turbonormalizing system, this airframe is approved for a 4,042 lb (1,833 kg) MTOW.
Bay Super V
A twin-engine conversion of the C35 Bonanza.
Parastu 14
Reverse engineered derivative of F33A by Defense Industries Organization of Iran, fitted with winglets. First flown April 5, 1988. Approximately 14 in service by 2001.

== Operators ==
=== Civil ===
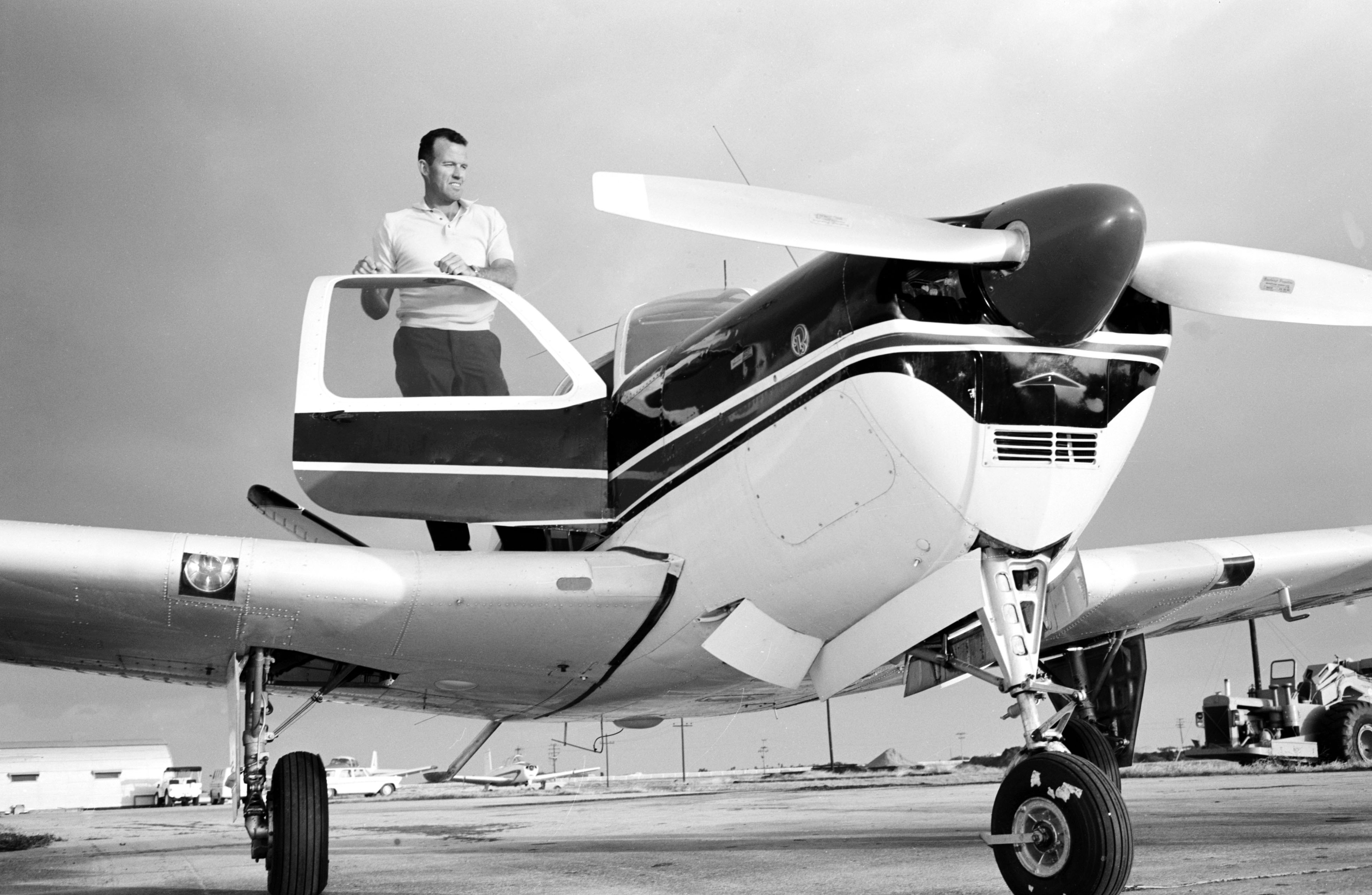
Astronaut Gordon Cooper, of Gemini V, poses on the wing of his personal Beechcraft Bonanza in 1963.

The Bonanza is popular with air charter companies, and is operated by private individuals and companies.

In 1949, Turner Airlines (later renamed Lake Central Airlines) commenced operations using three V-tail Bonanzas. That same year, Central Airlines began operations using eight Bonanzas, later adding three more to the fleet before starting to phase them out in 1950 in favor of the Douglas DC-3.

=== Military ===
Haiti
Haitian Air Corps – 1 x Bonanza F33
Indonesia
Indonesian Naval Aviation – 4 x Bonanza G36. Formerly operated Bonanza F33A
Iran
Imperial Iranian Air Force – 10 x Bonanza F33A and 39 x Bonanza F33C
Israel
Israeli Air Force - Bonanza A36 called Hofit.
Ivory Coast
Ivory Coast Air Force – 1 x Bonanza F33C
Mexico
Mexican Air Force – 10 x Bonanza F33C
Netherlands
Netherlands Government Flying School – 16 x Bonanza F33C
Nicaragua
National Guard – 1 x Bonanaza A35
Portugal
Portuguese Air Force – 1 × Bonanza A35 operated 1949–55.
Spain
Spanish Air Force – 29 x Bonanza F33C and 25 x Bonanza F33A
Thailand
Royal Thai Navy – 3 x Beech 35 Bonanza

== Notable flights ==
- In January 1949, the fourth Bonanza to come off the production line was piloted by Captain William Odom from Honolulu, Hawaii, to the continental United States (2,900 statute miles), the first light airplane to do so. The airplane was called Waikiki Beech, and its 40-gallon (150 L) fuel capacity was increased (using fuselage and wing tanks) to 268 gallons (1010 L), which gave a still-air range of nearly 5,000 statute miles.
- In March 1949, Captain Odom piloted Waikiki Beech a distance of 5,273 miles (8,486 km) from Honolulu to Teterboro, New Jersey, setting a nonstop record. The flight time was 36:01 hours, at an average speed of 146.3 miles per hour (235.4 km/h), consuming 272.25 US gallons (1,030.6 L; 226.70 imp gal) of fuel. After that flight, the airplane was donated to the Smithsonian Institution's National Air Museum, as the National Air and Space Museum was then called.
- On October 7, 1951, an American congressman from Illinois, Peter F. Mack, Jr., began an around-the-world trip in Waikiki Beech, on loan from the museum and reconditioned at the Beech factory, and renamed Friendship Flame. He spent 15 weeks traveling through 30 countries (223 hours flight time). The plane was again refurbished in 1975 and returned to the National Air and Space Museum. It is still on display there, with both names painted on its sides.
- On May 31, 2014, 19-year-old MIT student Matt Guthmiller from Aberdeen, South Dakota, departed Gillespie Field in El Cajon, California, in a 1981 A36 Bonanza on a 44-day-12-hour solo circumnavigation, making him the Guinness World Record holder as the youngest person to fly solo around the world when he landed back in El Cajon on July 14, 2014, at 19 years, 7 months, and 15 days of age. During 170 hours of flight time, he made 23 stops in 15 countries on five continents, and covered about 30,500 miles (49,100 km), while raising awareness for computer science education and supporting Code.org.

== Accidents and incidents ==
- On October 28, 1947, Oregon Governor Earl Snell, Oregon Secretary of State Robert S. Farrell Jr., and State Senate President Marshall E. Cornett were killed along with pilot Cliff Hogue when their Bonanza 35 crashed in stormy weather southwest of Dog Lake in Lake County, Oregon.
- On January 26, 1952, Zubeida Begum and Hanwant Singh, Maharaja of Jodhpur, died when their Beechcraft Bonanza crashed in Godwar (Rajasthan), India. Hanwant Singh was overworked while campaigning for elections and is reported to have been sleeping only four hours a night. The wreckage from this crash was discovered in storage in the cellar of the Central Jail in Jodhpur in 2011.
- On July 31, 1955, the rising Hollywood star Robert Francis died with two others when the Bonanza he was piloting crashed immediately after take-off from Burbank Airport.
- On February 3, 1959, rock and roll stars Buddy Holly, Ritchie Valens, and The Big Bopper, as well as pilot Roger Peterson, died when their Beechcraft Bonanza 35, registration N3794N, crashed shortly after takeoff at night in poor weather. The accident in northern Iowa later became known as "The Day the Music Died", after Don McLean referred to it by that name in his song "American Pie".
- On July 31, 1964, country music star Jim Reeves and his pianist Dean Manuel died when the Beechcraft Debonair N8972M Reeves was piloting crashed in the Brentwood area of Nashville during a violent thunderstorm.
- On February 14, 1975, Congressman Jerry Pettis was killed when the Beechcraft Model V35B Bonanza he was piloting crashed near Cherry Valley, California, after he encountered adverse weather conditions. The Jerry Pettis Memorial Veterans Administration Hospital in Loma Linda, California, is named in his honor.
- On February 7, 1981, Apple Computer cofounder Steve Wozniak crashed his Beechcraft Bonanza while taking off from Santa Cruz Sky Park. The NTSB investigation revealed Wozniak did not have a "high performance" endorsement (meaning he was not legally qualified to operate the airplane) and had a "lack of familiarity with the aircraft." The cause of the crash was determined to be a premature liftoff, followed by a stall and "mush" into a 12-foot embankment. Wozniak later made a full recovery, albeit with a case of temporary anterograde amnesia.
- On March 19, 1982, Ozzy Osbourne's guitarist Randy Rhoads was killed when the wing of the Bonanza F35 in which he was riding hit the band's tour bus then crashed into a tree and a nearby residence. Both of the other people on the aircraft, pilot Andrew Aycock and Osbourne's makeup artist Rachel Youngblood, also died in the crash. The NTSB cited the causes of the crash as poor judgement, buzzing, and misjudged clearance, as well as indicating that the use of the aircraft was not authorized by the aircraft's owner.
- On January 14, 1996, Armenian-Turkish musician Onno Tunç died when a private Bonanza crashed in bad weather on a mountain at Tazdağ near Selimiye village of Armutlu, Yalova on his journey from Bursa to Istanbul.
- On November 13, 2002, satellite television broadcasting pioneer Henry Howard Taylor dies when a Beechcraft A36TC Bonanza suffers engine failure just after takeoff from San Andreas, California, and crashes in a bed of rocks in an otherwise grassy field, killing two of the three people on board.
- On March 13, 2006, game show host Peter Tomarken crashed his Bonanza A36 into Santa Monica Bay while climbing from Santa Monica Airport in California. He was en route to San Diego to pick up a cancer patient who needed transportation to UCLA Medical Center for treatment. Tomarken and his wife were killed in the crash.
- On July 23, 2014, Haris Suleman, a Pakistani-American pilot attempting to fly around the world in 30 days to promote education, crashed his Beechcraft Bonanza in the Pacific Ocean, killing him and leaving his father Babar Suleman, also on board, missing.

== Specifications (2011 model G36) ==
3-view line drawing of the Beechcraft V35B Bonanza

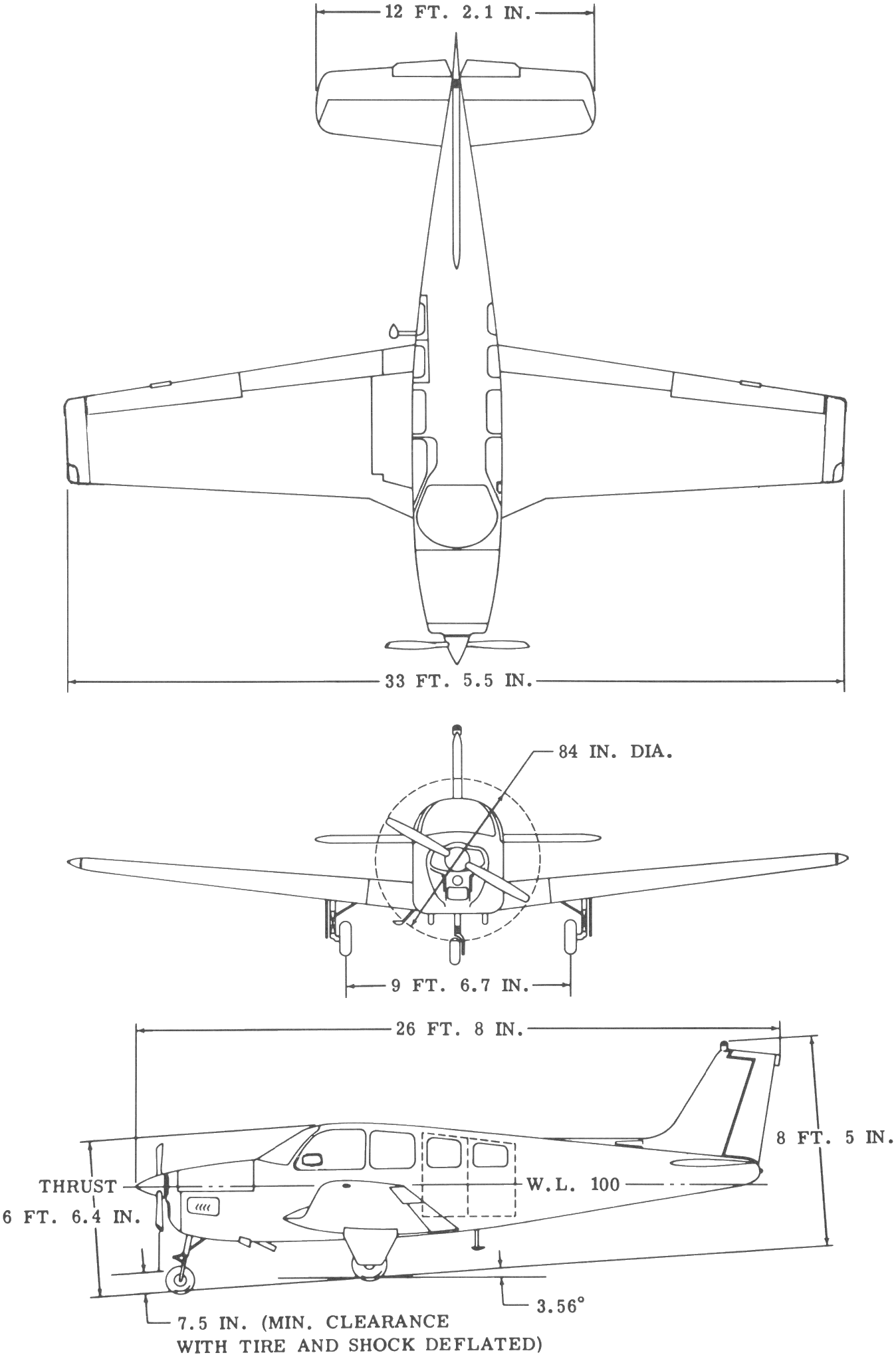
3-view line drawing of the Beechcraft A36 Bonanza

Data from Hawker Beechcraft

General characteristics

- Crew: one
- Capacity: five passengers
- Length: 27 ft 6 in (8.38 m)
- Wingspan: 33 ft 6 in (10.21 m)
- Height: 8 ft 7 in (2.62 m)
- Wing area: 181 sq ft (16.8 m^{2})
- Aspect ratio: 6.2
- Airfoil: Root:NACA 23016.5. Tip:23012
- Empty weight: 2,517 lb (1,142 kg)
- Gross weight: 3,650 lb (1,656 kg)
- Powerplant: 1 × Continental IO-550-B , 300 hp (220 kW)
- Propellers: three-bladed Hartzell Propeller, 6 ft 8 in (2.03 m) diameter

Performance

- Cruise speed: 176 kn (203 mph, 326 km/h)
- Range: 716 nmi (824 mi, 1,326 km) with full passenger load
- Ferry range: 930 nmi (1,070 mi, 1,720 km)
- Service ceiling: 18,500 ft (5,600 m)
- Rate of climb: 1,230 ft/min (6.2 m/s)
- Wing loading: 20.16 lb/sq ft (98.4 kg/m^{2})

Avionics

- Garmin G1000

== See also ==
Related development

- Beechcraft QU-22 Pave Eagle
- Bay Super V
- Beechcraft Baron
- Beechcraft T-34 Mentor
- Beechcraft Travel Air

Aircraft of comparable role, configuration, and era

- Bellanca Viking
- Cessna 210
- Mooney M20
- Parastu 14
- Piper PA-24 Comanche
- Piper PA-32R 301T Saratoga II TC

Related lists

- List of military aircraft of the United States
- List of most-produced aircraft
