= William Kittredge =

American writer (1932–2020)

- Born: August 14, 1932; Portland, Oregon, U.S.
- Died: December 4, 2020 (aged 88)
- Education: Oregon State University; Iowa Writers' Workshop (MFA)
- Years active: 1976–2017

William Kittredge (August 14, 1932 – December 4, 2020) was an American writer from Oregon, United States, who lived mostly in Missoula, Montana.

== Biography ==
He was born in 1932 in Portland, Oregon, and grew up on a ranch in Southeastern Oregon's Warner Valley in Lake County, where he attended school in Adel, Oregon. He later attended high school in California and Oregon. He earned his undergraduate degree in agriculture from Oregon State University. At age 35, he retired from ranching and enrolled at the Iowa Writers' Workshop of the University of Iowa, where he completed his M.F.A.

Kittredge's father, Oscar, was friends with the leadership in the Republican Party in Oregon. Oscar was to be picked up by Oregon Governor Earl Snell for a hunting trip in October, 1947 when the plane Snell and Oregon Secretary of State Robert Farrell, among others, were flying in crashed en route, killing all four on board.

He became a major voice with his 1987 collection of essays, Owning It All, about the modern West. He followed with Hole in the Sky: A Memoir. His book The Nature of Generosity holds forth on the value of what he terms extreme long loop altruism, elaborating with refreshing insights and wisdom on sustainability, civilization, and its relationship to culture, history, and human nature. He was also co-producer of the movie, A River Runs Through It.

He received numerous awards including a Stegner Fellowship at Stanford and Writing Fellowships from the National Endowment for the Arts. With Annick Smith, he edited The Last Best Place: A Montana Anthology.

William Kittredge also published essays and articles in many magazines including The Atlantic, Harper's, Esquire, Time, Newsweek, and newspapers The Washington Post and The New York Times, mostly about the West.

He taught creative writing at the University of Montana in Missoula for 30 years and received a Lifetime Achievement Award at the Montana Book Festival in September 2017.

== Works authored ==
- The Van Gogh Field and Other Stories (1976)
- We Are Not in This Together (1984)
- Owning It All (1987)
- Phantom Silver (1987)
- The Last Best Place: A Montana Anthology (1990), with Annick Smith, University of Washington Press
- Hole in the Sky: A Memoir (1992)
- Who Owns the West? (1995, Mercury House)
- Big Sky Country: The Best of Montana, North Dakota, Wyoming, and Idaho (1996), with photographer Michael Melford, Rizzoli Ed.
- The Portable Western Reader (anthology, 1997), Penguin Classics - Portable Library
- Taking Care: Thoughts on Storytelling and Belief (1999)
- The Nature of Generosity (2001), Vintage - Random House Ed.
- Southwestern Homelands (2002)
- The Willow Field (2006)
- The Next Rodeo: New and Selected Essays (2006)
