= Earl T. Newbry =

American politician

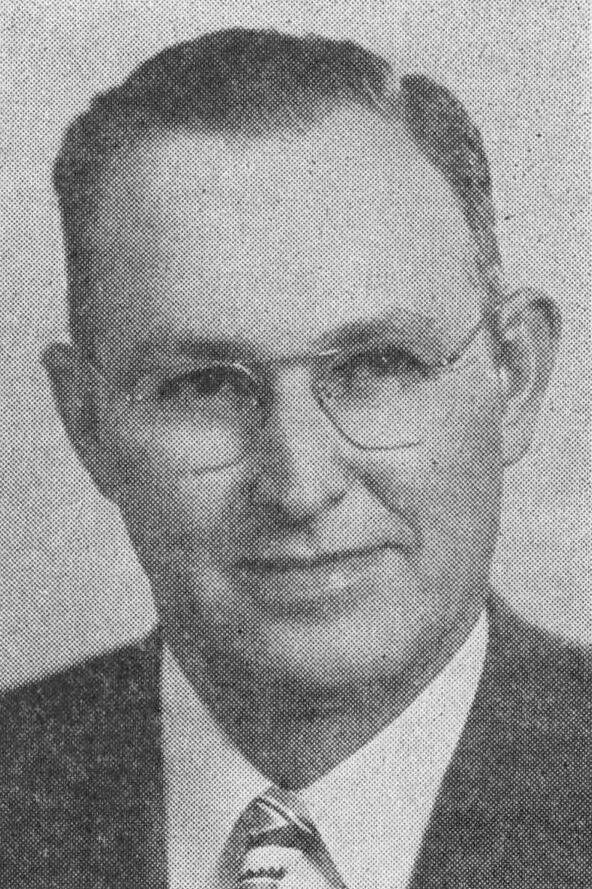
- Newbry in 1948

15th Secretary of State of Oregon
- In office November 3, 1947 – January 7, 1957
- Governor: John H. Hall; Douglas McKay; Paul L. Patterson; Elmo Smith
- Preceded by: Robert S. Farrell, Jr.
- Succeeded by: Mark O. Hatfield

Member of the Oregon House of Representatives
- In office 1939–1942
- Constituency: Jackson County

Personal details
- Born: April 15, 1900 Rocky Ford, Colorado, U.S.
- Died: September 2, 1995 (aged 95) Ashland, Oregon, U.S.
- Party: Republican
- Occupation: Businessman

Earl T. Newbry (April 15, 1900 – September 2, 1995) was an American businessman and politician from the state of Oregon. A native of Colorado, he served as the twenty-fifth Secretary of State of Oregon after appointment by Oregon Governor John Hubert Hall. A Republican, he previously served two terms in the Oregon House of Representatives and three terms in the Oregon State Senate.

== Early life ==
Earl Newbry was born in Rocky Ford, Colorado, on April 15, 1900. He and his family came to Oregon in the early 1920s. They established themselves in Jackson County in the city of Ashland. Newbry managed a fruit growing and packing firm in the Rogue River Valley before entering politics.

== Political career ==
Newbry ran for a seat in the Oregon House of Representatives and won the House District 19 seat which at the time was Jackson County in 1938. He served in the Oregon House for the 1939 and 1941 legislative sessions. A Republican from Ashland, he was then elected to the Oregon Senate representing District 6 in 1942. Newbry served in the state senate during the 1943, 1945, and 1947 sessions of the Oregon Legislature.

In late October 1947, Governor Earl Snell, Secretary of State Robert S. Farrell, Jr., and Senate President Marshall Cornell were killed in a plane accident near Dog Lake, Oregon, while on their way to a hunting trip. As the first two successors were killed along with the Oregon Governor, the Speaker of the House, John Hubert Hall, became governor. Hall's first act as governor was to appoint Newbry as Oregon Secretary of State.

In office, Newbry was responsible for creating branch offices of the Department of Motor Vehicles across the state and implementing the use of permanent license plates in the state. He won election to a full term in office in 1948 and then won re-election in 1952, defeating Edith Green; in 1949 he declined to seek the Republican nomination for governor. Newbry remained in office until January 7, 1957.

He was an unsuccessful candidate for governor in 1954, losing the Republican primary to Paul L. Patterson.

== Later years ==
After leaving office, he returned to Southern Oregon and resumed his business career. Earl T. Newbry died on September 2, 1995, in Ashland, Oregon.

== Electoral history ==
1952 Republican primary
Candidate name	Votes
Earl T. Newbry	230,232

1952 General Election
Candidate name	Votes
Earl T. Newbry (R)	370,216
Edith Green (D)	301,894

Political offices
Preceded by Robert S. Farrell	Secretary of State of Oregon; 1947–1957	Succeeded by Mark Hatfield
