= Carl C. Donaugh =

American politician and lawyer

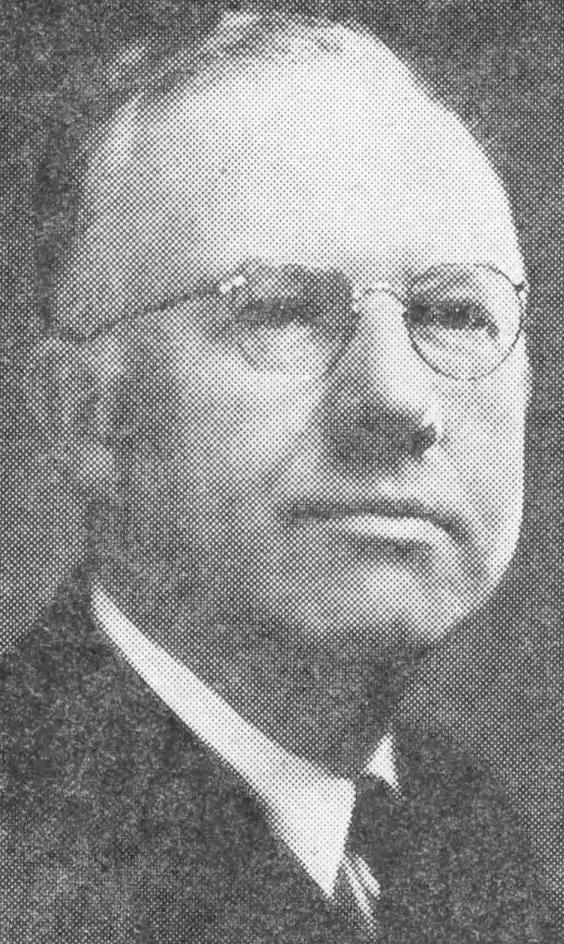

United States Attorney for the District of Oregon
- In office 1933–1945
- Succeeded by: Henry L. Hess

Chair of the Democratic Party of Oregon
- In office 1930–1934

Personal details
- Born: December 25, 1900 Portland, Oregon, U.S.
- Died: November 8, 1965 (aged 64)
- Party: Democratic

Carl Clinton Donaugh (December 25, 1900 – November 8, 1965) was an American lawyer and politician from Oregon.

== Biography ==
Donaugh was born in 1900 in Portland, Oregon.

He served as secretary of the Democratic Party of Oregon from 1926 until 1928, and as state party chair from 1930 until 1934. He was also a delegate to the 1932 Democratic National Convention. Donaugh served as U.S. Attorney for the United States District Court for the District of Oregon from 1933 until 1945.

Donaugh also made several unsuccessful runs for political office; first for U.S. Senate in 1938, losing in the Democratic primary. In 1946, he was the Democratic nominee for governor. He lost to Earl Snell with 31% of the vote. In 1950, Donaugh ran for the U.S. House in Oregon's 3rd congressional district. He lost to incumbent Republican Homer D. Angell with 44% of the vote.

Donaugh became engaged to Viva Owens Todd in 1940.

Party political offices
Preceded by Lew Wallace	Democratic nominee for Governor of Oregon; 1946	Succeeded by Lew Wallace
