= 1946 Oregon gubernatorial election =

- November 5, 1946
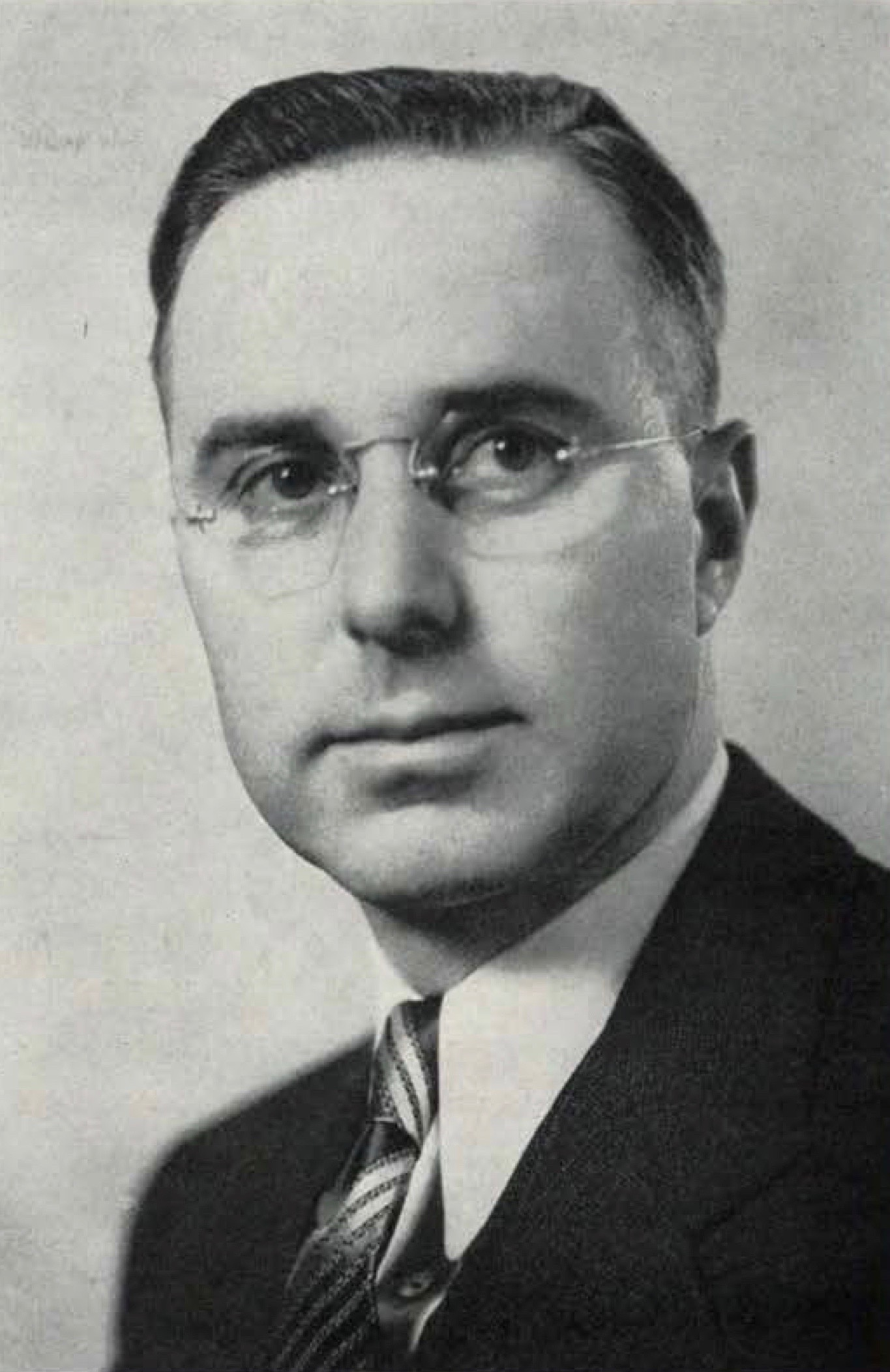

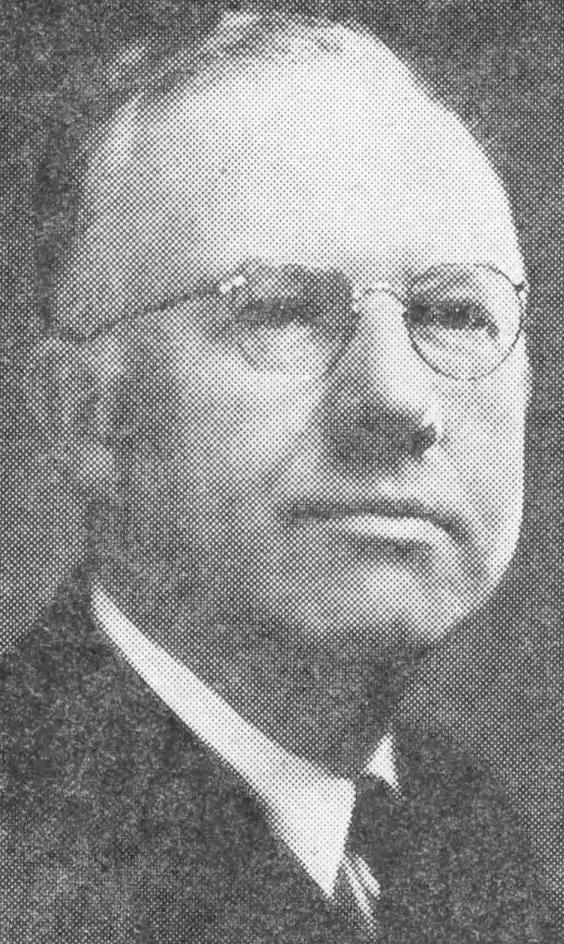
Nominee	Earl Snell	Carl C. Donaugh
Party	Republican	Democratic
Popular vote	237,681	106,474
Percentage	69.06%	30.94%
- County results Snell: 60–70% 70–80% 80–90%
Governor before election
Earl Snell
Republican
Elected Governor
Earl Snell
Republican

The 1946 Oregon gubernatorial election took place on November 5, 1946 to elect the governor of the U.S. state of Oregon. Republican incumbent Earl Snell defeated Democratic nominee and former U.S. District Attorney Carl C. Donaugh to win the election. Snell once again swept every county in the state, albeit with a slightly reduced (though still commanding) majority from the previous election.

== Primary election ==
Oregon held primary elections on May 17, 1946.

=== Republican party ===
Incumbent governor Earl Snell faced only token opposition in the primary election.

==== Candidates ====
- Henry Black
- Earl Snell, incumbent governor

==== Results ====
Republican primary results
Party	Candidate	Votes	%
Republican	Earl Snell (inc.)	83,035	84.53%
Republican	Henry Black	15,177	15.45%
Republican	Scattering	16	0.02%
Total votes		98,228	100.00%

=== Democratic party ===
Former U.S. District Attorney Carl C. Donaugh was unopposed in the Democratic primary.

==== Candidates ====
- Carl C. Donaugh, former U.S. District Attorney

==== Results ====
Democratic primary results
Party	Candidate	Votes	%
Democratic	Carl C. Donaugh	51,237	99.06%
Democratic	Scattering	488	0.94%
Total votes		51,725	100.00%

== General election ==
=== Results ===
1946 Oregon gubernatorial election
Party	Candidate	Votes	%	±%
Republican	Earl Snell (inc.)	237,681	69.06%	−8.81%
Democratic	Carl C. Donaugh	106,474	30.94%	+8.81%
Total votes		344,155	100.00%	
Majority		131,207	38.12%	
Republican hold		Swing	-17.62%	

=== Results by county ===
County	Earl Snell Republican		Carl C. Donaugh Democratic		Margin		Total votes cast
County	#	%	#	%	#	%	Total votes cast
Baker	3,106	71.52%	1,237	28.48%	1,869	43.03%	4,343
Benton	4,980	80.84%	1,180	19.16%	3,800	61.69%	6,160
Clackamas	14,680	69.23%	6,524	30.77%	8,156	38.46%	21,204
Clatsop	6,242	73.59%	2,240	26.41%	4,002	47.18%	8,482
Columbia	3,766	69.56%	1,648	30.44%	2,118	39.12%	5,414
Coos	5,621	73.30%	2,047	26.70%	3,574	46.61%	7,668
Crook	973	78.28%	270	21.72%	703	56.56%	1,243
Curry	959	80.12%	238	19.88%	721	60.23%	1,197
Deschutes	3,177	73.42%	1,150	26.58%	2,027	46.85%	4,327
Douglas	6,294	80.59%	1,516	19.41%	4,778	61.18%	7,810
Gilliam	646	80.65%	155	19.35%	491	61.30%	801
Grant	1,025	79.58%	263	20.42%	762	59.16%	1,288
Harney	781	76.05%	246	23.95%	535	52.09%	1,027
Hood River	2,123	72.83%	792	27.17%	1,331	45.66%	2,915
Jackson	8,157	79.81%	2,064	20.19%	6,093	59.61%	10,221
Jefferson	578	78.43%	159	21.57%	419	56.85%	737
Josephine	3,877	75.80%	1,238	24.20%	2,639	51.59%	5,115
Klamath	6,443	78.09%	1,808	21.91%	4,635	56.18%	8,251
Lake	998	78.15%	279	21.85%	719	56.30%	1,277
Lane	16,106	75.54%	5,216	24.46%	10,890	51.07%	21,322
Lincoln	3,561	73.21%	1,303	26.79%	2,258	46.42%	4,864
Linn	8,247	75.04%	2,743	24.96%	5,504	50.08%	10,990
Malheur	3,114	77.35%	912	22.65%	2,202	54.69%	4,026
Marion	15,701	75.24%	5,168	24.76%	10,533	50.47%	20,869
Morrow	827	78.39%	228	21.61%	599	56.78%	1,055
Multnomah	80,196	60.17%	53,088	39.83%	27,108	20.34%	133,284
Polk	3,646	75.80%	1,164	24.20%	2,482	51.60%	4,810
Sherman	600	80.97%	141	19.03%	459	61.94%	741
Tillamook	2,715	68.82%	1,230	31.18%	1,485	37.64%	3,945
Umatilla	5,113	74.32%	1,767	25.68%	3,346	48.63%	6,880
Union	3,439	72.46%	1,307	27.54%	2,132	44.92%	4,746
Wallowa	1,467	76.09%	461	23.91%	1,006	52.18%	1,928
Wasco	2,415	71.49%	963	28.51%	1,452	42.98%	3,378
Washington	9,805	73.18%	3,593	26.82%	6,212	46.37%	13,398
Wheeler	544	81.68%	122	18.32%	422	63.36%	666
Yamhill	5,759	74.09%	2,014	25.91%	3,745	48.18%	7,773
Total	237,681	69.06%	106,474	30.94%	131,207	38.12%	344,155
