= IRIAF Parastu-14 =

Iranian trainer aircraft

Parastu-14

General information
- Type: Trainer aircraft
- Manufacturer: HESA
- Designer: Islamic Republic of Iran Air Force
- Status: Active service
- Primary user: Islamic Republic of Iran Air Force

History
- Introduction date: September 2013 (Unveiled)
- Developed from: Beechcraft 33 Bonanza

Parastu-14 (Persian: پرستو ۱۴), is an Iranian trainer aircraft developed by the Islamic Republic of Iran Air Force and produced by HESA. The Parastu-14 entered service with the IRIAF after passing preliminary tests.

== Unveiling ==
Parastu-14 trainer aircraft was introduced during an unveiling ceremony in "Hunting base of Shahid Major General Pilot Hossein Lashgari" in September 2013, and was added to Iran's military air-force. According to the deputy commander of the "Islamic Republic of Iran Air Force" --Mohsen Darreh Baghi (محسن دره باغی)-- the production of this kind of training-aircraft which are done by using advanced aeronautical technologies, will be continued.
