= Olex, Oregon =

Unincorporated community in the state of Oregon, United States

- Unincorporated community
- Location within Oregon Location within the United States
- Coordinates: 45°29′50″N 120°10′08″W
- Country: United States
- State: Oregon
- County: Gilliam
- Elevation: 1,020 ft (310 m)
- Time zone: UTC-8 (Pacific (PST))
  - Summer (DST): UTC-7 (PDT)
- GNIS feature ID: 1124980

Olex is an unincorporated community in Gilliam County, Oregon, United States. It is located along Oregon State Route 19 about halfway between Condon and Arlington, at the bottom of the Rock Creek Grade.

Olex was named for Alex Smith, a local resident; the name was misspelled in transmission. The Olex post office operated from 1874 to 1976. Olex is the birthplace of Oregon politician Earl Snell, who served as Governor of Oregon from 1943 until 1947.
