= John Hubert Hall =

24th Governor of Oregon

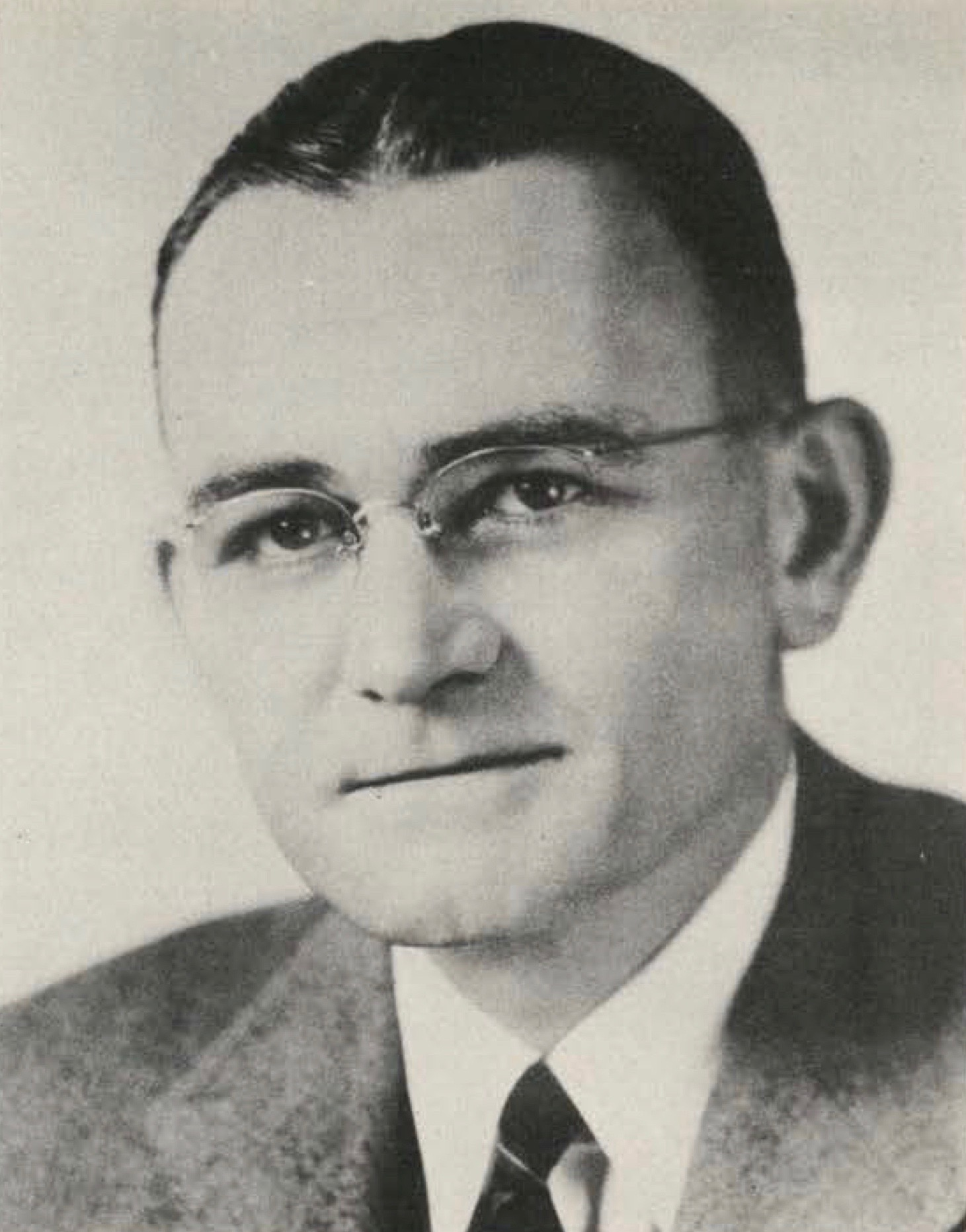

24th Governor of Oregon
- In office October 30, 1947 – January 10, 1949
- Preceded by: Earl Snell
- Succeeded by: Douglas McKay

Speaker of the Oregon House of Representatives
- In office January 13, 1947 – October 30, 1947
- Preceded by: Eugene E. Marsh
- Succeeded by: Frank J. Van Dyke

Member of the Oregon House of Representatives
- In office 1933 – October 30, 1947

Personal details
- Born: February 7, 1899 Portland, Oregon, US
- Died: November 14, 1970 (aged 71) Newport, Oregon, US
- Party: Republican
- Spouse(s): Elizabeth Walch; Alyce Johnson
- Profession: Lawyer

John Hubert Hall (February 7, 1899 – November 14, 1970) was an American Republican politician from the US state of Oregon. He was Speaker of the Oregon House of Representatives in 1947, second in line to the governorship, when the governor, secretary of state, and senate president were all killed in a plane crash. He served as the 24th governor of Oregon for just over one year.

== Early life and education ==
Hall was born in Portland, the son of John Hicklin Hall, who served as Oregon's District Attorney. He attended Lincoln and Jefferson high schools in Portland, and Culver Military Academy in Indiana. He graduated from Oregon State University in 1923 with a business administration degree.

During World War I, he served in the United States Navy as a medical corpsman, and upon his return home, held a variety of jobs before entering Portland's Northwestern School of Law (now a part of Lewis & Clark College), and was admitted to the bar in 1926. He married Elizabeth Walch on December 28, 1926, with whom he had two children before her death in 1937. He and Alyce Johnson married on December 31, 1941 and had one child.

In his practice, Hall specialized in corporate and business, representing many corporate clients, including liquor interests, which would play a role in his later political career. He had joined his father's firm in 1926, and upon the elder Hall's retirement, joined the Bowermann law firm in 1932, and later moved to Lincoln City, Oregon, and opened a private practice.

== Political career ==
Hall was a member of the Oregon House of Representatives (elected 1932, 1938, 1942, 1944, 1946), becoming Speaker in 1947. On October 28, 1947, Governor Earl Snell was killed in a plane crash along with the next in line of succession, President of the Senate Marshall E. Cornett. As second in line of succession, Hall became and served as Governor of Oregon until a 1948 special election could be held to elect a governor to complete the term. (In 1972, Oregon Ballot Measure 8 added the Oregon Secretary of State as first in line of succession; however, since Secretary of State Robert S. Farrell, Jr. was also killed in this crash, the result would have been the same.)

During Hall's short tenure as governor, he sought to adjust wages and salaries of state employees for inflation, was a strong supporter of education, and favored a plan to allocate state surpluses on construction projects for higher educational and other state institutions.

From the beginning, Hall's administration was marked by controversy regarding his attempts to liberalize the state's regulation of the liquor industry. He sought to reorganize the Oregon Liquor Control Commission, which he had felt had been arbitrary and non-judicial in its decisions when he had represented clients before it, and unresponsive to the legislature during his tenure as a State Representative. The issue came to a head with his dismissal of a commission member who had publicly disagreed with the governor over removing limits on the purchase of liquor.

During the height of the controversy, State Senator Douglas McKay, a friend of late Governor Snell, and president of the Automobile Dealer's Association, announced that he would challenge Hall in the 1948 Republican primary, and quickly launched a well-financed and organized campaign. A contentious race ensued, in which charges of conflicts of interest and immorality were brought to bear against Hall because of his liquor industry ties. Hall lost the nomination to McKay by a statewide vote of 103,224 to 107,993.

== Later life ==
After leaving office as governor, Hall moved to Lincoln County, Oregon, to practice law. He served one term as an Oregon district judge, (elected 1965), overcame throat cancer. After a short period of semi-retirement, died in Newport on November 14, 1970 at Pacific Communities Hospital.

Political offices
Preceded by Earl Snell	Governor of Oregon; 1947–1949	Succeeded by Douglas McKay
