= Annick Smith =

American film producer

Annick Smith (born 1936) is a French-born American writer and filmmaker whose work often focuses on the natural world.

== Biography ==
The daughter of Jewish-Hungarian émigrés, Smith was born in Paris and raised in Chicago, Illinois. In 1964, she moved to Montana, where she and her husband and sons eventually settled on a 163-acre (0.66 km^{2}) ranch in the Blackfoot River valley. Her husband died from heart failure in 1974, but Smith remained on the land to raise her sons. Her writings mostly revolve around the subjects of environmentalism, travel, and history of Montana. She was also a founding member of the Sundance Film Institute and Hellgate Writers in Missoula, Montana.

Among her books are Homestead, Big Bluestem, In This We Are Native and Crossing the Plains with Bruno. She also co-edited an anthology of Montana writing, The Last Best Place. Her travel writing and essays have appeared in journals such as Audubon, Outside, Islands, Travel + Leisure, and National Geographic Traveler.

In October 2018, Milkweed Editions published Hearth: A Global Conversation on Identity, Community, and Place, a book Smith co-edited with Susan O'Connor. Smith had previously worked with O'Connor on The Wide Open: Prose, Poetry, and Photographs of the Prairie, published by University of Nebraska Press in 2008.

Smith served as executive producer of the film Heartland and co-producer of A River Runs Through It, directed by Robert Redford. She was also a founding board member of Redford’s Sundance Institute. An often overlooked fact is that she is the producer of the documentary on the late poet Richard Hugo, Kicking the Loose Gravel Home: Richard Hugo.

Smith lived in Montana with her partner, the writer William Kittredge.
