= 1947 Oregon Beechcraft Bonanza crash =

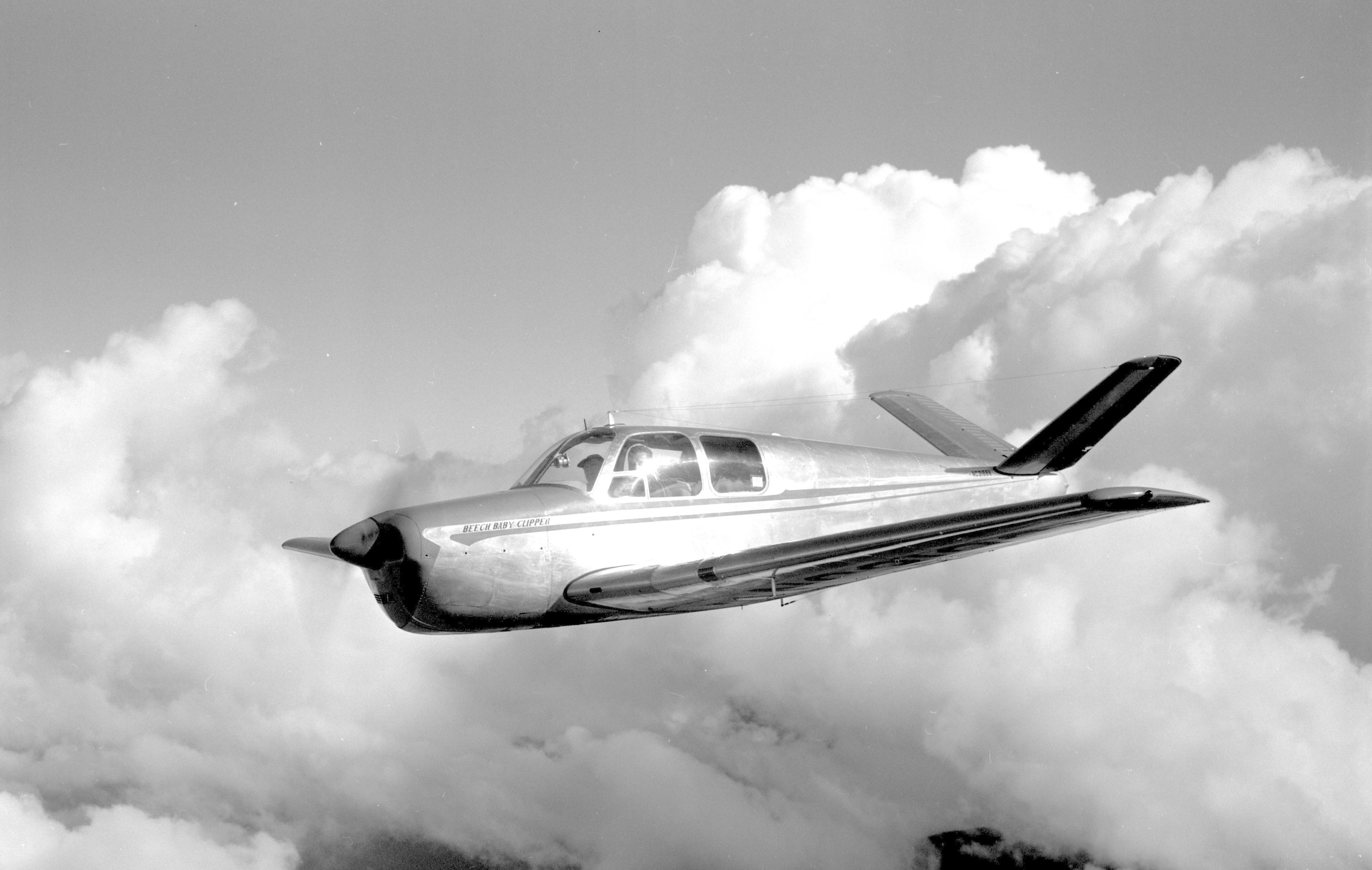
- A Beech 35 similar to the accident aircraft

Accident
- Date: October 28, 1947
- Summary: CFIT, hit mountainside in bad weather
- Site: southwest of Dog Lake in rural Lake County, Oregon

Aircraft
- Aircraft type: Beechcraft Bonanza
- Flight origin: Klamath Falls Airport
- Destination: Coleman Lake Landing Area
- Passengers: 3
- Crew: 1
- Fatalities: 4
- Survivors: 0

- Snell, Governor Earl W., Aircraft Crash Site
- U.S. National Register of Historic Places
- Location: T40S, R16E, sec25, Fremont-Winema NF, Lakeview Vicinity, Oregon
- NRHP reference No.: 100003032
- Added to NRHP: October 18, 2018

On October 28, 1947, Oregon Governor Earl Snell, Oregon State Senate President Marshall Cornett, and Oregon Secretary of State Robert S. Farrell, Jr. were killed in a crash of a Beechcraft Bonanza in stormy weather southwest of Dog Lake in rural Lake County, Oregon. The trio died along with the aircraft's pilot, who was taking them to an isolated area to hunt Canada geese. Oregon Speaker of the House John Hubert Hall, being the remaining highest-ranking person in the line of succession, rose to the governorship.

The crash site was added to the National Register of Historic Places on October 18, 2018.

== History ==
=== The incident ===
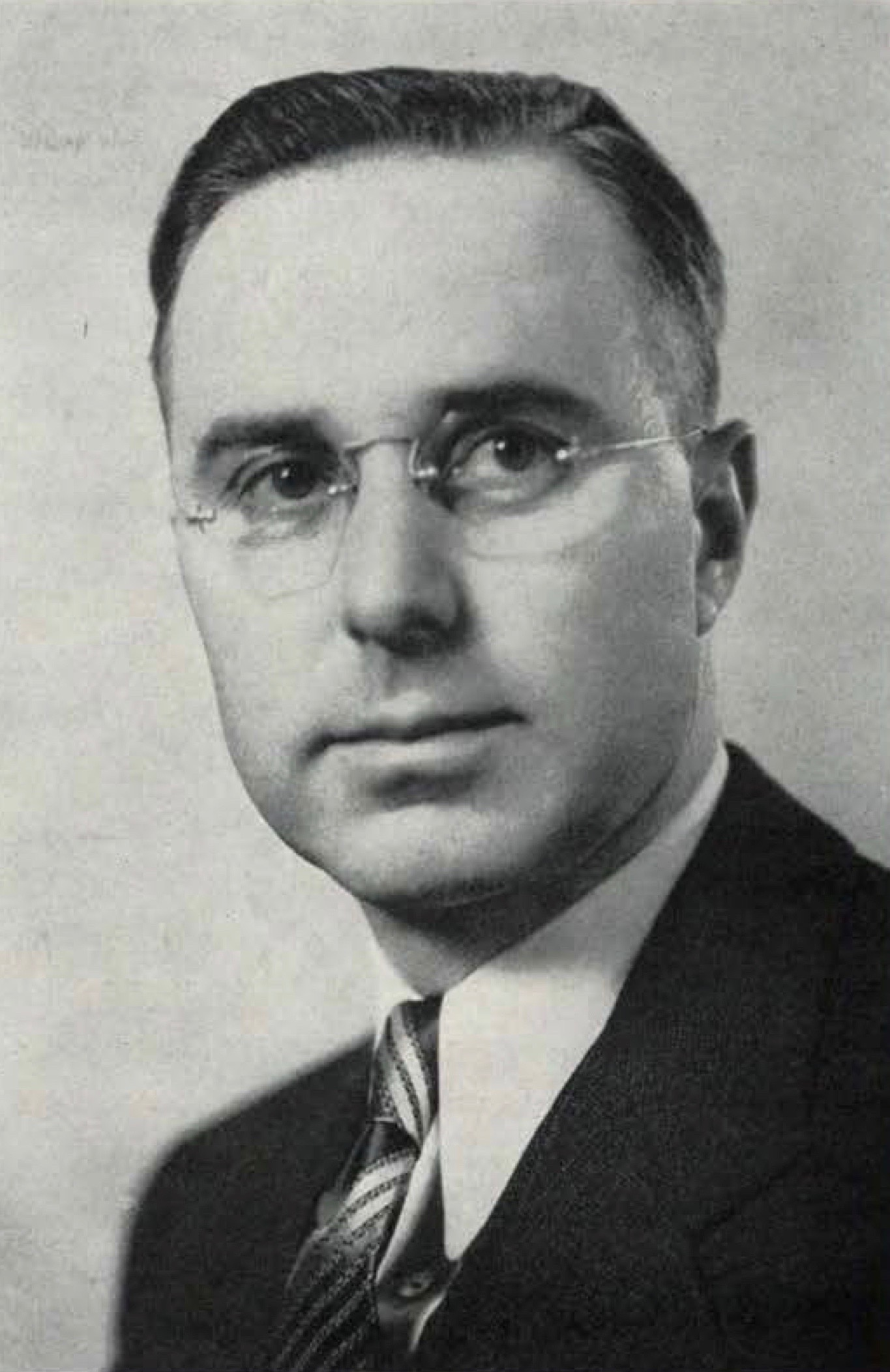
Governor Earl Snell

On October 28, 1947, a privately owned Beechcraft Bonanza airplane, piloted by veteran pilot Cliff Hogue, set out from Klamath Falls, Oregon, on a 70 mi (110 km) flight to take three prominent Oregon politicians on a trip to hunt Canada geese. The small party included three of the state's top five elected officials: Governor Earl Snell; the person second in succession to the Governorship, Senate President Marshall Cornett, and Secretary of State Robert S. Farrell, Jr.

Prior to departure the top Republican elected officials had dined together at the Klamath Falls home of Marshall Cornett. Pilot Hogue had checked by telephone at that time to confirm that weather conditions had cleared up in the Adel vicinity.

The small red-and-white plane took off from the Klamath Falls Airport at 10:00 pm on the night of Tuesday, October 28, with a 30-minute flight planned to the Kittredge Ranch in the isolated Warner Valley, located about 70 miles to the east, near the town of Adel. The aircraft was slated to land at the Coleman Lake Landing Area, located about 8 miles south of the Kittredge Ranch where the party would be hunting.

The plane, owned jointly by Senator Cornett and ranch owner Oscar Kittredge, never arrived at its destination. Oscar Kittredge had remained at the landing site until midnight before returning home, and had contacted Cornett's wife early the next day, October 29, to learn if plans had for some reason been changed. It was then that it was determined that the Beechcraft Bonanza had gone missing. A search ensued.

=== Search efforts ===
News of Governor Snell's missing flight garnered front page attention around the state of Oregon.

Oregon Senate President Marshall Cornett, co-owner of the aircraft, was killed in the October 1947 crash.

A search and rescue operation was immediately launched, with 14 planes from the area launched the next morning to begin systematically searching for the missing aircraft and any sign of survivors. Officials held out hope that the small plane had been able to land in a small, flat area and that its limited radio range was being blocked by the rugged terrain in the region.

Commander of the Oregon National Guard Gen. Raymond F. Olson authorized the 123rd National Guard Air Squadron to assist in the search and rescue operation, as needed, with at least 4 planes immediately dispatched from their base in Portland.

The search was targeted to the vicinity of Dog Lake in Lake County due to a telephone tip from a cattle ranch employee camped in the vicinity, who reported having heard the faltering engine of a small plane shortly after 10:00 pm the previous evening. This led searchers based out of Lakeview Airport to search the vicinity of Dog Lake, where they discovered the plane's crash site about 2 miles west of the lake at 4:00 pm on October 29. The nearest town to the site of the crash was the hamlet of Bly, located 22 miles north of the nearly inaccessible, heavily forested place of impact.

The crash had occurred in a mountainous region at about 6,000 feet elevation, with the hillsides heavily timbered in mature Ponderosa pine. Those originally discovering the crash site reported that the plane had cut a swath through the hillside, snapping off trees, bending the aircraft's wings at a 90-degree angle and mangling it so severely that "no one could be alive."

The bodies of Snell (age 52), Cornett (49), and Farrell (41) were recovered on October 30, with darkness and rugged terrain having prevented their recovery the same day the crash was discovered. One passenger had been ejected from a door that had come open in the crash with the other three bodies remaining strapped in the fuselage, according to a member of the U.S. Forest Service party which made its way to the scene.

=== Political succession ===
According to the Oregon Constitution as written at the time of the crash, the simultaneous deaths of both the Governor and his heir-apparent, the President of the Senate, elevated the Speaker of the Oregon House of Representatives to the Governorship as next in the order of succession. Portland Republican Representative John Hall thus assumed the mantle of leadership.

The order of succession to the governorship in Oregon was constitutionally changed in the early 1970s, to place the Secretary of State first in succession and the State Treasurer second.
