= Marshall E. Cornett =

American politician

Member of the Oregon Senate from the 17th district
- In office 1941–1947
- Preceded by: Ulysses S. Balentine
- Succeeded by: Philip S. Hitchcock
- Constituency: Crook, Deschutes, Jefferson, Klamath and Lake counties, Oregon

President of the Oregon State Senate
- In office 1947–1947
- Preceded by: Howard C. Belton
- Succeeded by: William E. Walsh

Personal details
- Born: November 22, 1898 Burning Springs, Kentucky
- Died: October 28, 1947 (aged 48) Lake County, Oregon
- Party: Republican
- Occupation: Automobile dealer

Marshall Eugene Cornett (November 22, 1898 – October 28, 1947) was an Oregon businessman and American Republican politician serving in the Oregon State Senate and as Senate President during the 1947 legislative session. Along with Governor of Oregon Earl Snell and Oregon Secretary of State Robert S. Farrell, Jr., he was killed in a plane crash in 1947.

== Early life and business career ==
Cornett was born in Burning Springs, Kentucky (Clay County), in rural southeastern Kentucky. He served in the United States Army during World War I before moving to Klamath Falls, Oregon where he established himself as a businessman. He was the owner of successful automobile dealerships and three radio stations in the Klamath Falls area. In June 1922, Cornett married Olive Byram (1891–1977) in Kake, Alaska. He briefly served as a police officer in Astoria, Oregon.

== Political career ==
Cornett served in the Oregon State Senate from 1941, to 1947 representing the 17th legislative district. In his final term, he served as Senate President. He was an alternate delegate to the 1944 Republican National Convention.

On October 28, 1947, Cornett and two other top office-holders, Oregon Governor Earl Snell and Oregon Secretary of State Robert S. Farrell, Jr., were killed in a plane crash while en route to the Kittredge Ranch in Warner Valley near Lakeview, Oregon. "The Kittredge's were hosting a goose hunt for these Oregon officials. The airplane left Klamath Falls about 10:00 P.M. (or later) and did not arrive at the Kittredge Ranch."

Pilot Cliff Hogue perished as well, when his small plane crashed in stormy weather southwest of Dog Lake. A state funeral was held for Snell, Farrell and Cornett at the Capitol in Salem.

Marshall Cornett's remains were interred at Macedonia Cemetery, Burning Springs, Kentucky.

== See also ==
- 1947 Oregon Beechcraft Bonanza crash
