= Robert S. Farrell Jr. =

American politician

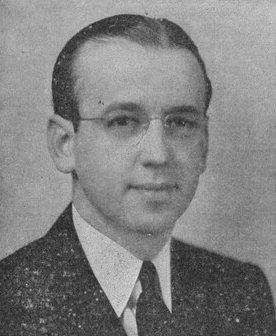
- Farrell in the 1942 voter pamphlet

Secretary of State of Oregon
- In office January 4, 1943 – October 28, 1947
- Governor: Earl Snell
- Preceded by: Earl Snell
- Succeeded by: Earl T. Newbry

40th Speaker of the Oregon House of Representatives
- In office 1941–1942
- Preceded by: Ernest R. Fatland
- Succeeded by: William M. McAllister
- Constituency: Multnomah County

Personal details
- Born: October 25, 1906 Portland, Oregon
- Died: October 28, 1947 (aged 41) Lake County, Oregon
- Party: Republican

Robert Sylvester Farrell Jr. (October 25, 1906 – October 28, 1947) was an American Republican politician in the state of Oregon.

== Political career ==
He lived in Portland, Multnomah County, Oregon, and served as a Delegate to the Republican National Convention from Oregon in both 1940 and 1944. Farrell was elected as the Speaker of the Oregon House of Representatives in 1941. He served as Oregon Secretary of State from 1943 until his death in 1947.

== Death ==
He died in office while flying to southern Oregon on a hunting trip, with Oregon Governor Earl Snell, State Senate President Marshall E. Cornett and pilot Cliff Hogue. All four were killed when the small plane crashed in stormy weather near Dog Lake, Lake County, Oregon, on October 28, 1947. His interment was at River View Cemetery in Portland, Oregon.

Political offices
Preceded by Earl Snell	Secretary of State of Oregon; 1943–1947	Succeeded by Earl T. Newbry
