= Earl Snell =

23rd Governor of Oregon

Earl W. Snell
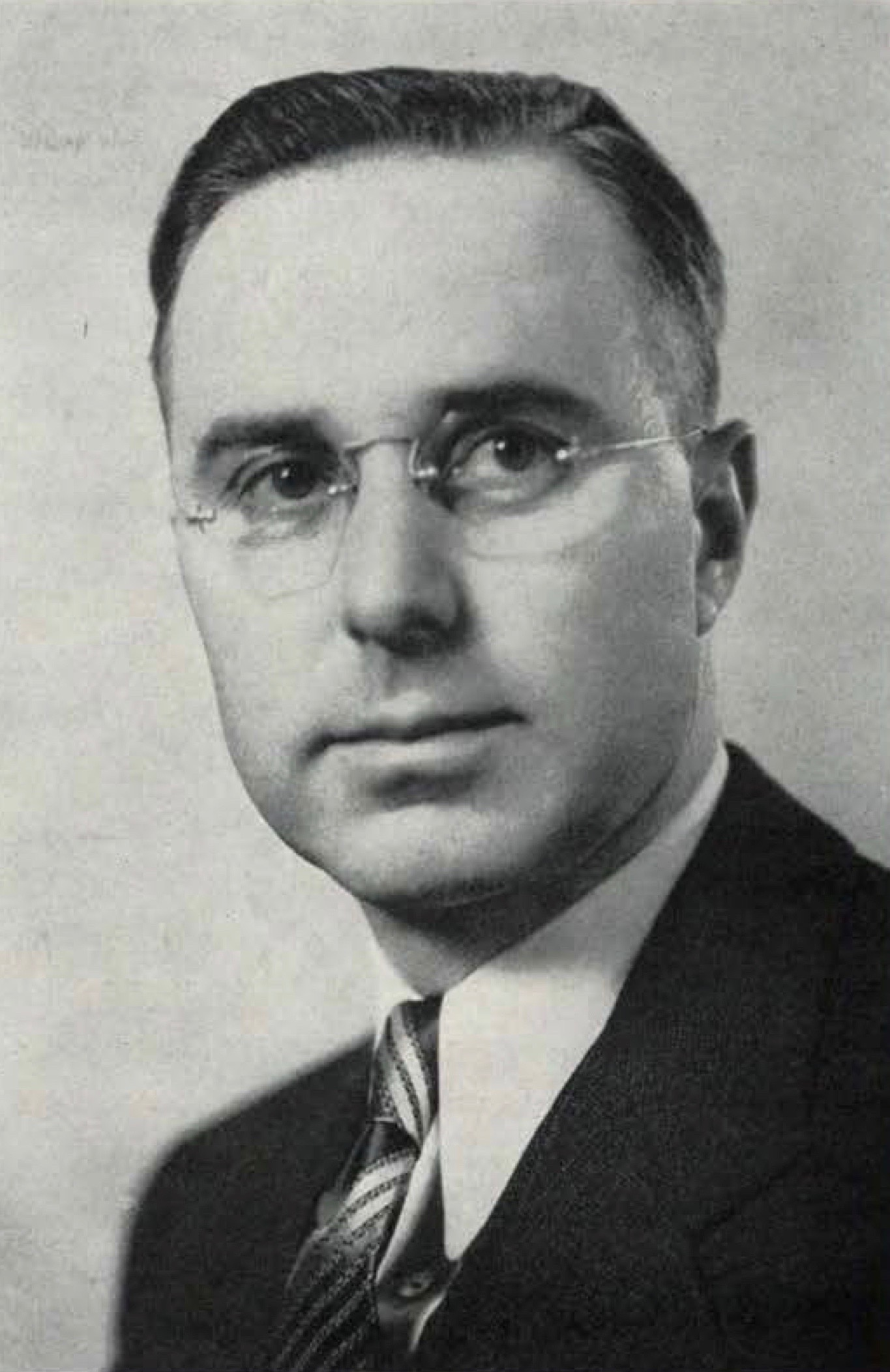

23rd Governor of Oregon
- In office January 11, 1943 – October 28, 1947
- Preceded by: Charles A. Sprague
- Succeeded by: John Hubert Hall

13th Oregon Secretary of State
- In office January 7, 1935 – January 4, 1943
- Governor: Charles H. Martin; Charles A. Sprague
- Preceded by: Peter J. Stadelman
- Succeeded by: Robert S. Farrell Jr.

Member of the Oregon House of Representatives
- In office 1926–1934

Personal details
- Born: July 11, 1895 Olex, Oregon, U.S.
- Died: October 28, 1947 (aged 52) Lake County, Oregon, U.S.
- Party: Republican
- Spouse: Edith Welshons
- Children: 1
- Profession: Automobile dealer

Earl Wilcox Snell (July 11, 1895 – October 28, 1947) was an American politician, businessman, and member of the Republican Party, serving in the Oregon House of Representatives, as the Oregon Secretary of State, and as the 23rd governor of Oregon. American journalist John Gunther described Snell as "genial, mediocre, and perpetually on the fence."

== Early life and business career ==
Snell was born on a farm near the small town of Olex, Oregon. He grew up in Arlington. He received a public school education, and attended the Oregon Institute of Technology without attaining a degree (this Oregon Institute of Technology was located in Portland, a private institution, and not connected to the Oregon Institute of Technology in Klamath Falls). He became a partner in Arlington's automobile dealership. After military service during World War I, he settled in nearby Condon, where he married Edith Welshons, with whom he had one son, and published the local newspaper. He became sole owner of the auto dealership in Arlington, and it was his principal livelihood for the rest of his life. He later expanded his business interests to include ranching and banking.

In a WUGA TV interview with well known musician Doc Severinsen, Severinsen—who is from Arlington—reported that he used to live with Snell and his wife during the summers as a boy. Doc stated Snell gave him his first instrument (an army bugle) and strongly influenced him. Snell would also sometimes take Doc down to the Capital building when he was governor.

== Political career ==
After serving on the Arlington City Council, in 1926 he was elected to the first of four consecutive terms in the Oregon House of Representatives, his final term as Speaker. In 1934, despite inroads by Democrats in Oregon in previously Republican Oregon, Snell was elected Oregon Secretary of State, serving from 1935 to 1943.

Prevented by a term limit from seeking another term as Secretary of State, Snell decided to challenge his own party's incumbent Gov. Charles A. Sprague in the Republican primary. He received strong support from the state automobile dealers association, gained the nomination, and went on to be elected Governor with 78 percent of the vote, taking office on January 11, 1943.

Snell's administration was marked by conservationist measures, public works projects and relief programs in line with the federal New Deal programs, and initiatives designed to promote agricultural, timber and industrial interests to expand Oregon's economy. He was re-elected in 1946, by a margin of more than two to one, but died in office the next year.

Snell was a staunch supporter of the internment of Japanese Americans during World War II. In 1944, he sponsored a law aimed at Issei and Nisei returnees, which would have denied Japanese-born non-citizens the right to own or lease land. It also would've prosecuted landowning Japanese-American citizens for allowing others of Japanese descent, including their parents, to occupy or work the land. The law easily passed through the Oregon legislature, but was ruled unconstitutional by the courts.

== Death ==
On October 28, 1947, Snell, Oregon Secretary of State Robert S. Farrell, Jr., and State Senate President Marshall E. Cornett were killed along with pilot Cliff Hogue when their small plane crashed in stormy weather southwest of Dog Lake in Lake County, Oregon. The group left Klamath Falls about 10:00 p.m. en route to a ranch owned by Oscar Kittredge in Warner Valley near Lakeview, Oregon. A state funeral was held for Snell, Farrell and Cornett at the Capitol in Salem. Snell was buried in Salem's Belcrest Memorial Park.

== See also ==
- 1947 Earl Snell plane crash

== Footnotes ==
Political offices
Preceded by Peter J. Stadelman	Secretary of State of Oregon; 1935–1943	Succeeded by Robert S. Farrell, Jr.
Preceded by Charles A. Sprague	Governor of Oregon; 1943–1947	Succeeded by John H. Hall
Party political offices
Preceded by Charles A. Sprague	Republican nominee for Governor of Oregon; 1942, 1946	Succeeded by Douglas McKay
