= Murnane =

- Pronunciation: /ˈmʊrnɑːn/
- Language: English

Origin
- Language: Irish
- Origin: Ó Manannáin
- Derivation: Ó Murnáin
- Meaning: 'descendant of Manannán'

Other names
- Variant forms: Murnan, Murrane

Murnane is a surname of Irish origin. It is an Anglicized form of the Gaelic name Ó Manannáin meaning descendant of the Celtic sea god Manannán, the warrior and king or guardian of the Otherworld in Irish mythology who is associated with the sea, and the Isle of Man, and often interpreted as a sea god.

== Surname ==
Notable people with the surname include:

- Daniel William Ewart Murnane (1926–2016), Australian footballer
- David (Dave) Murnane (1893–1925), Irish hurler
- David J. Murnane (1892–1953), Singapore municipal water engineer
- Dylan Murnane (born 1995), Australian soccer player
- Francis J. Murnane (1914–1968), American longshore worker and campaigner for the preservation of Portland's historical monuments
- George Murnane, banker and founder of Monnet, Murnane & Co.
- Gerald Murnane (born 1939), Australian writer
- Hugh Richard Murnane (1916–1974), Australian footballer
- John Murnane (born 1948), Australian footballer
- Lee Murnane (born 1959), Australian footballer
- Margaret Mary Murnane (born 1959), Irish-American physicist
- Peter Murnane (born 1955), Australian footballer
- Ramon Frederick Murnane (1937–2013), Australian footballer
- Richard John Murnane (born 1945), American economist
- Timothy Hayes Murnane (1850–1917), Irish-born American baseball player, manager and sportswriter
- Tom Murnane, Irish hurler
- William Joseph Murnane (1945–2000), American Egyptologist

== Given name ==
Notable people with the given name include:

- Jennifer Murnane O'Connor (born 1966), Irish politician

== See also ==
- Murnane Field, baseball stadium in Utica, New York
- Frances J. Murnane Memorial Wharf
- Murnane Service Reservoir, service reservoir in Singapore
- Monnet, Murnane & Co., international investment banking firm founded in 1935
