= Simon Benson =

Norwegian-American businessman (1851–1942)

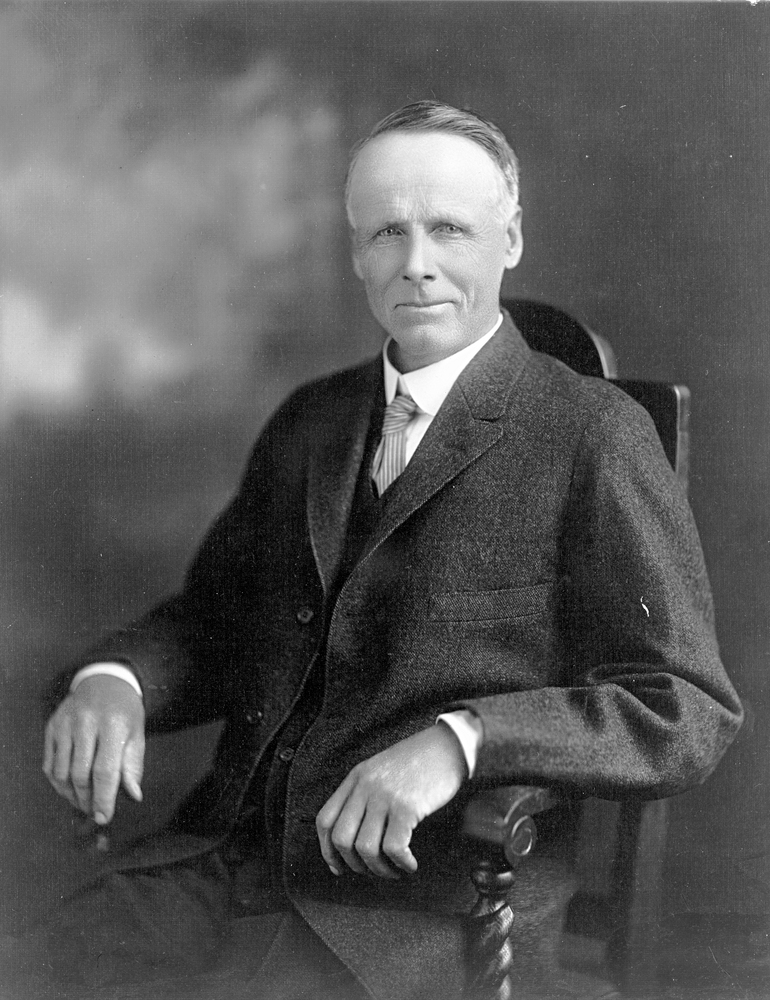
- Benson circa 1925

Chairman of the Oregon State Highway Commission
- In office March 1, 1917 – December 31, 1918
- Preceded by: office established
- Succeeded by: R. A. Booth

Personal details
- Born: Simen Bergersen Klæve; September 9, 1851 Gausdal, Oppland, Norway
- Died: August 5, 1942 (aged 90) Beverly Hills, California, U.S.
- Party: Republican
- Spouses: Esther Searles (m. 1877; died 1891); Pamelia Loomis (after 1891)
- Children: 5
- Relatives: Sig Unander (grandson)
- Occupation: Businessman; philanthropist

Simon Benson (born Simen Bergersen Klæve, September 9, 1851 – August 5, 1942) was a Norwegian-born American businessman and philanthropist who was active in the city of Portland, Oregon.

== Early life ==
Simon Benson was born Simen Bergersen Klæve in the valley of Gausdal in Oppland county, Norway. He was one of seven children in the Berger Iversen family. His eldest brother Jon immigrated to the United States in 1861, followed by his sister Mathea in 1865. In 1867, his parents and the rest of the family also followed – landing first in New York City, and then traveling to Black River Falls, Wisconsin, to join the oldest son and daughter. Simon Bergersen was 16 when he arrived in the United States. After arriving in the United States, the family had taken out naturalization papers, changed their family surname to "Benson" and proceeded to become United States citizens.

== Career ==
Benson first went to work as a farm hand and later worked in logging camps and sawmills. At the age of 24, he opened a general store in Lynxville, Wisconsin. It did well until it was destroyed by fire three years later. Then 27, he was completely broke and now had a wife and son to care for.

Having heard about abundance of the timber in the Northwest and with his experience working in the woods and sawmills of Wisconsin, Benson moved his family to Portland, Oregon in 1880. Simon had two more children before Esther died in 1891 after a long fight with tuberculosis. In 1894 Simon remarried had two more children.

Riding through two personal cycles of prosperity and poverty before his third and lasting success, Benson went into the business of logging near Clatskanie, Oregon and Oak Point, Washington, downstream from Portland, buying up tracts of timber wherever he could. He introduced a number of changes to Northwest logging, including the donkey steam engine which replaced the oxen that had previously been used to haul logs. He later built the famous Benson seagoing rafts which could carry up to six million board feet (14,000 m^{3}) of timber, cutting the cost of transporting logs to markets in California.

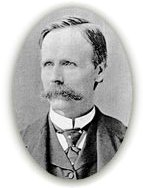
Benson circa 1900

In 1898, he moved his family and his business headquarters back to Portland. The family lived in a rented house for two years until Benson decided to build a new home at the corner of SW Park and Montgomery. This is the home known as the Simon Benson House. Placed on the National Register of Historic Places in 1983, it was later saved from city condemnation and restored by the Friends of Simon Benson House and moved to the Portland State University (PSU) campus at SW Park and Montgomery in 2000. It houses a visitor center and is home to the PSU Alumni Association.

=== Success ===
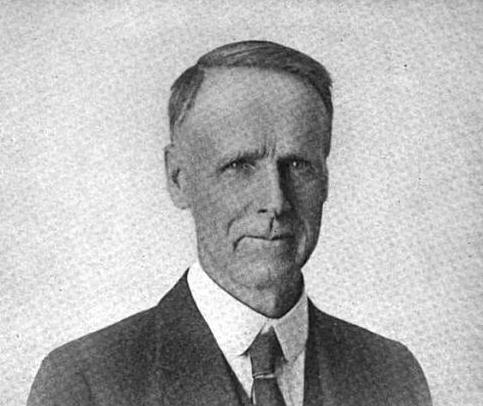
Benson in 1914

Now a wealthy man, Benson's interests expanded beyond the timber industry. In 1912, he began building a fine hotel because he felt it was needed in Portland to attract tourists and more commerce to the city. It was modeled on the Blackstone Hotel in Chicago, a brick structure with the same type of French mansard roof. It opened in 1913 and was known as the Oregon Hotel. For sixteen months it lost money and finally Benson took over management, at which time it became known as the Benson Hotel.

From 1917 to 1918, Benson served as chairman of the Oregon State Highway Commission.

Benson later built the Columbia Gorge Hotel near Hood River in 1921. He brought Henry Thiele, head chef at the Benson Hotel and later owner of his own famous restaurants in Portland, to be its general manager. Benson was also an enthusiastic supporter of good roads and among a group of businessmen who encouraged the building of the Columbia River Highway. When citizens of Hood River County voted a $75,000 bond levy to construct the portion of the highway that would run from the Multnomah County line to Hood River, Benson purchased the entire bond issue within a month because the bonds were not selling.

== Death and legacy ==
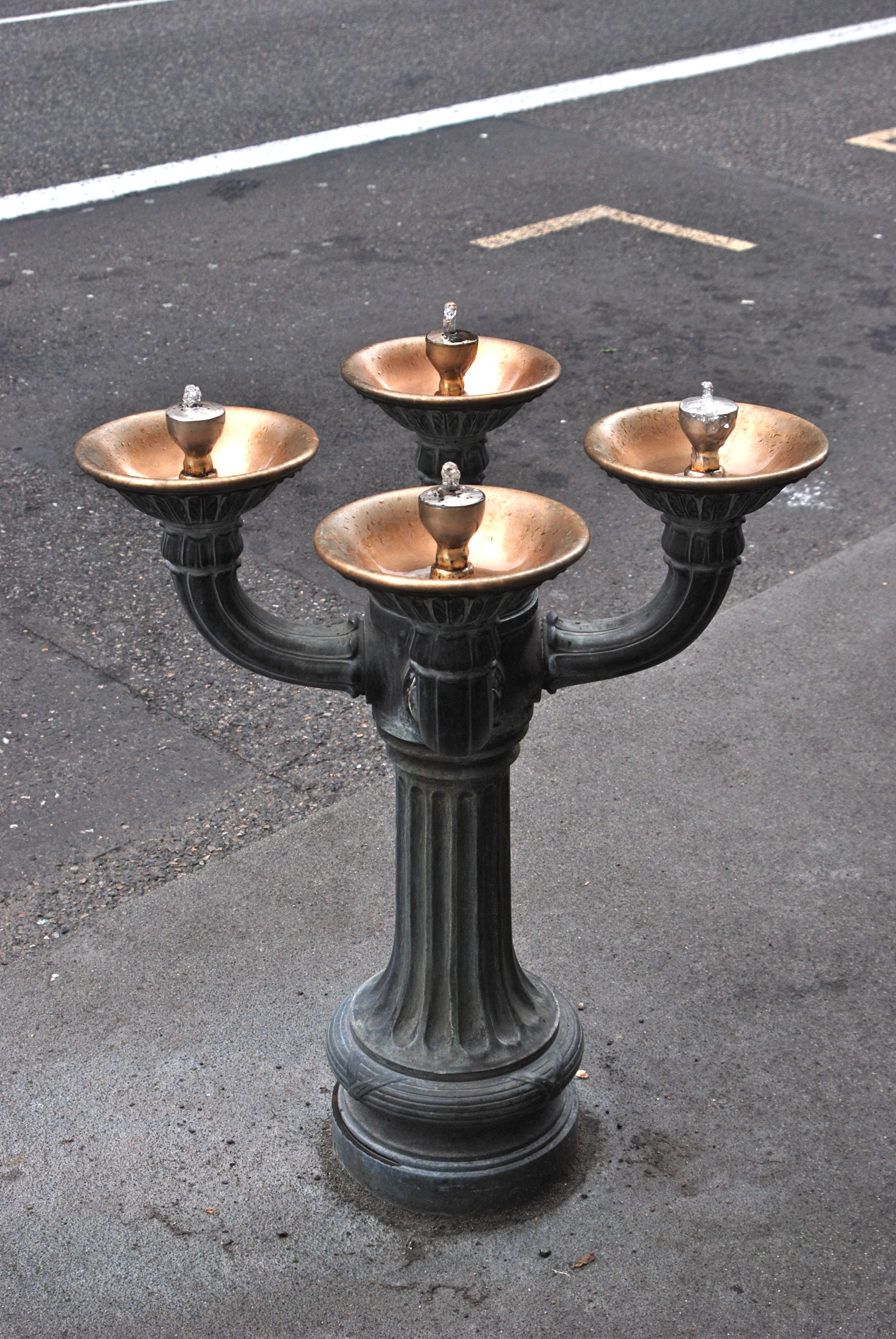
One of many "Benson Bubblers" in downtown Portland

In the early 1920s, Benson moved to southern California to retire, but gradually became active in business again, buying and developing land and managing business properties. He died in Beverly Hills, California in August 1942. Benson is buried at River View Cemetery in Portland.

Benson is well remembered for his philanthropy. He has been quoted as having said: "No one has the right to die and not leave something to the public and for the public good."

Benson purchased a 400-acre (1.6 km^{2}) tract of land in the Columbia River Gorge, which included Wahkeena Falls and Multnomah Falls, and deeded it to the City of Portland for a public park. Subsequently, the land was divided to become the Wahkeena Falls Recreation Area, Benson State Park, and Multnomah Falls Recreation Area. The waterfalls are now overseen by the US Forest Service. Benson also paid for the masonry footbridge across Wahkeena Falls and the reinforced concrete arch pedestrian bridge over the lower Multnomah Falls.

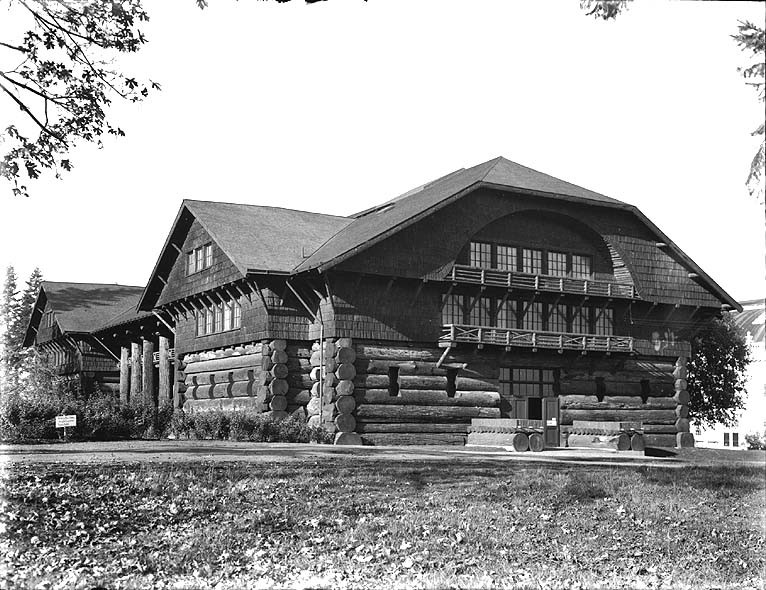
Forestry Building at the Lewis and Clark Centennial Exposition, Portland

In 1905 Benson donated lumber to build the Forestry Building at the Lewis and Clark Centennial Exposition in Portland. The building was the largest wooden building at the time and it burnt down in 1964. The interior was copied in the Glacier Park Lodge.

Simon Benson was a tee-totaler and he wanted to discourage his workers from drinking alcohol in the middle of the day. In 1912, Benson gave the City of Portland $10,000 for the installation of twenty bronze temperance fountains for clean drinking water. These fountains, known as "Benson Bubblers", are still in use in downtown Portland. Today there are 52 Benson fountains, most in Portland but also one in Sapporo, Japan (since 1965), the first of Portland's sister cities; one at the Maryhill Museum of Art in the Columbia River Gorge; and since 2012 one in Pendleton, Oregon. Conservationist Francis J. Murnane was instrumental in preserving the bubblers, his first successful project.

Benson was chosen to represent Oregon at the Panama–Pacific International Exposition in San Francisco in 1915, as the state's "Notable Citizen."

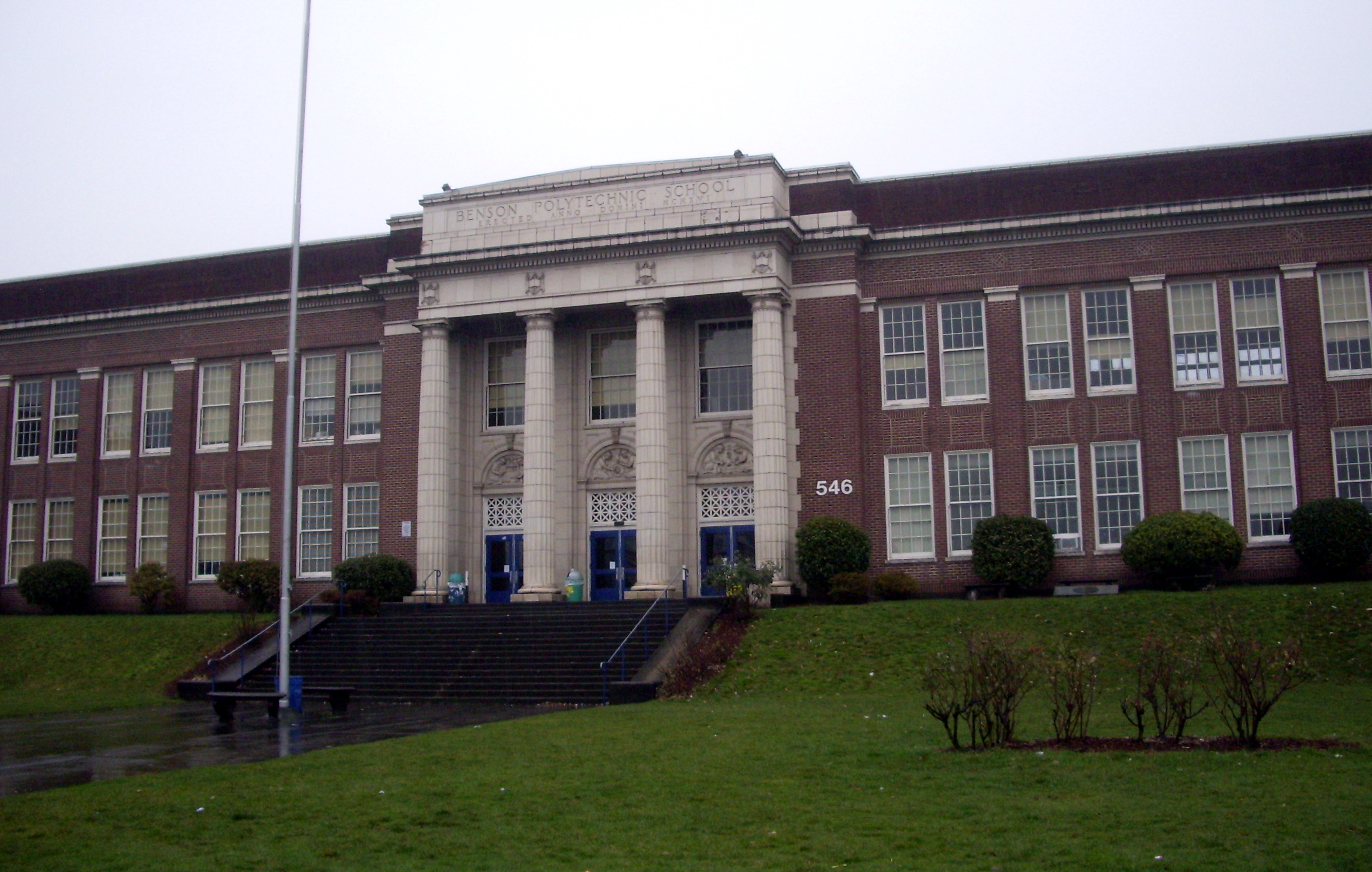
Benson Polytechnic High School

In 1916, Benson gave the Portland School District $100,000 to help fund the building of a polytechnic school. Finished in 1918, the school was first used for the training of soldiers for World War I. It was re-opened to high school students in January 1919 and renamed Benson Polytechnic.

In 1921, after moving to Beverly Hills, California, Benson deeded the city of Portland nine acres overlooking the Willamette River between North Greeley and Going Streets. The land was later dedicated as Madrona Park.

=== Simon Benson Award ===
The Simon Benson Award was created in 1999 to honor the region's contemporary pioneers of philanthropy. Portland State University's Simon Benson Award honors philanthropists who have made a lasting impact in the region.

== Personal life ==
Benson married Esther Searles sometime around 1878. They had three children, Amos, Alice, and Caroline. She died in 1891 after a long fight with tuberculosis. He married Pamelia Loomis in 1894 and they had two children, Gilbert and Chester.

Benson is the grandfather of Sig Unander, a politician who served as Oregon State Treasurer from 1953 to 1959, and ran unsuccessfully for governor and US Senate.
