= Boon Brick Store =

- U.S. National Register of Historic Places
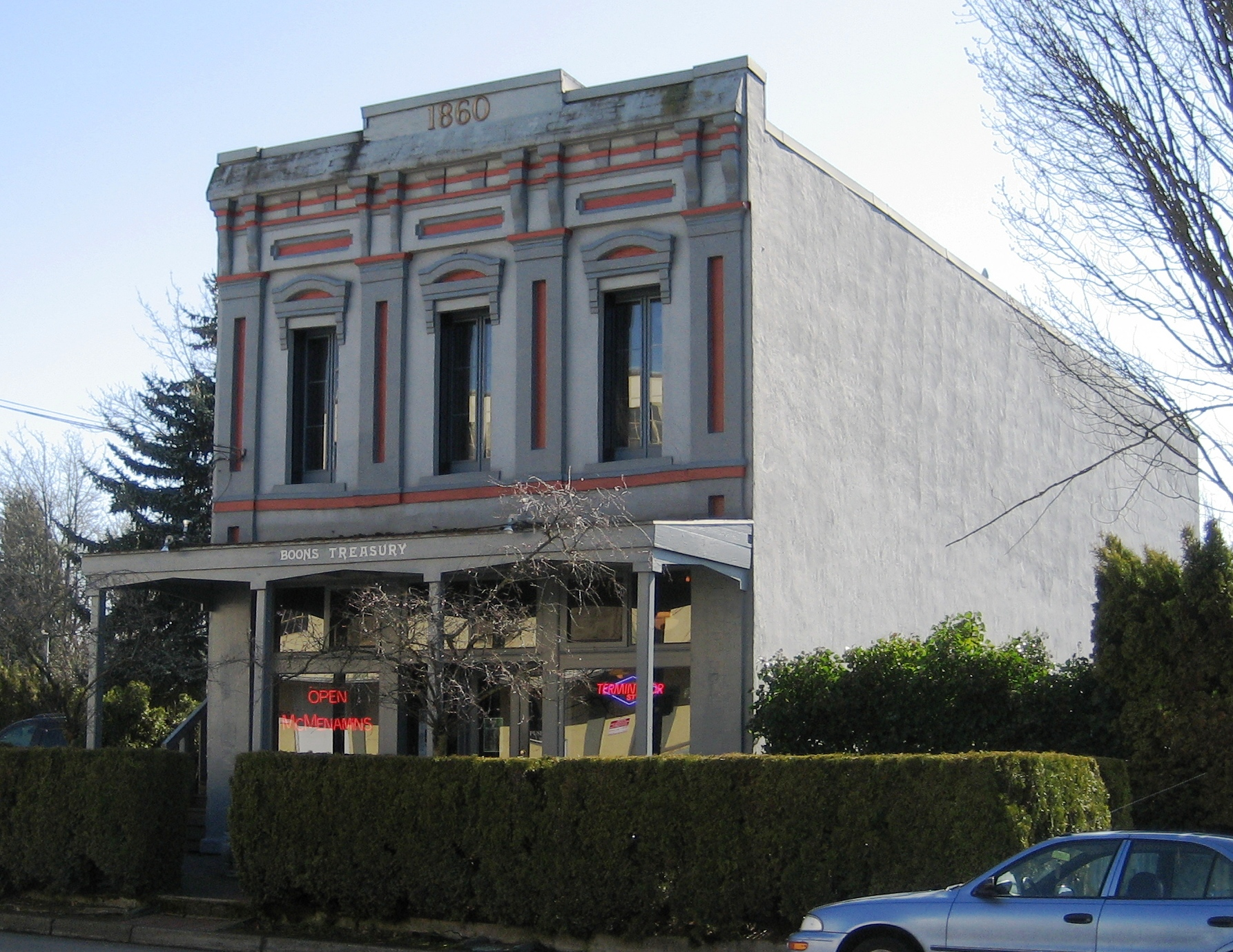
- The building's exterior in 2009

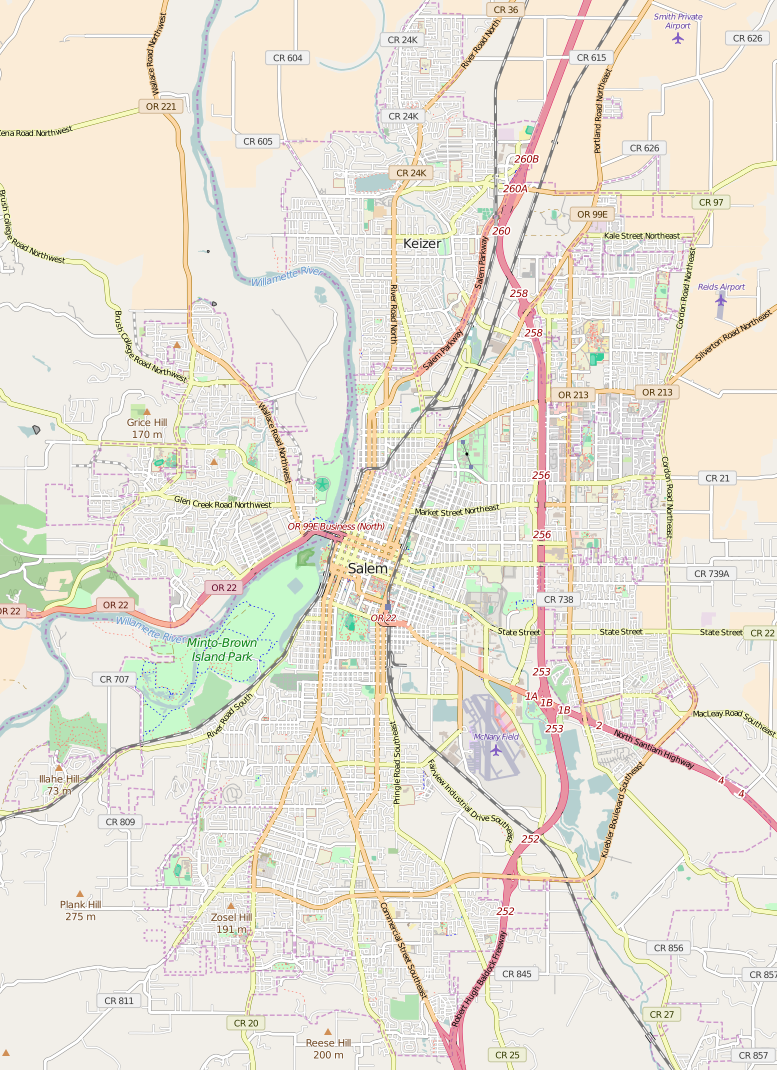
- Location within Salem OR Location within Oregon
- Location: 888 Liberty St NE, Salem, Oregon
- Coordinates: 44.948148°N 123.033314°W
- Area: 0.1 acres (0.040 ha)
- Built: 1860
- Architectural style: Italianate
- NRHP reference No.: 75001590
- Added to NRHP: November 20, 1975

The Boon Brick Store is a historic building in Salem, Oregon, United States. It was built as a general store by John D. Boon who became the first Oregon State Treasurer. It also once served as Oregon's first State Treasury. It is now a brewpub owned by the McMenamins chain known as Boon's Treasury. Before being bought by McMenamins, it was known as Karr's Tavern.

The two-story Italianate-style brick structure was added to the National Register of Historic Places in 1975. John D. Boon House at Mission Mill Museum was formerly located next to the store.

A local legend states that as a teenager, President Herbert Hoover carved his initials into the outside of the building during his three-year stay with relatives in Salem. At the time the building was William Lincoln Wade's grocery store.
