= Thomas Kay =

Thomas, Tom or Tommy Kay may refer to:

- Thomas B. Kay (1864–1931), American politician and businessman
- Thomas Lister Kay (1837/38–1900), English-born weaver and businessman
- Tom Kay (footballer, born 1883) (1883–1934), English footballer for Bury
- Tom Kay (footballer, born 1892) (1892–1940), English footballer for Stoke
- Tom Kay (rower) (born 1969), British lightweight rower.
