= Charles Pleasant Bishop =

American businessman and politician (1854–1941)

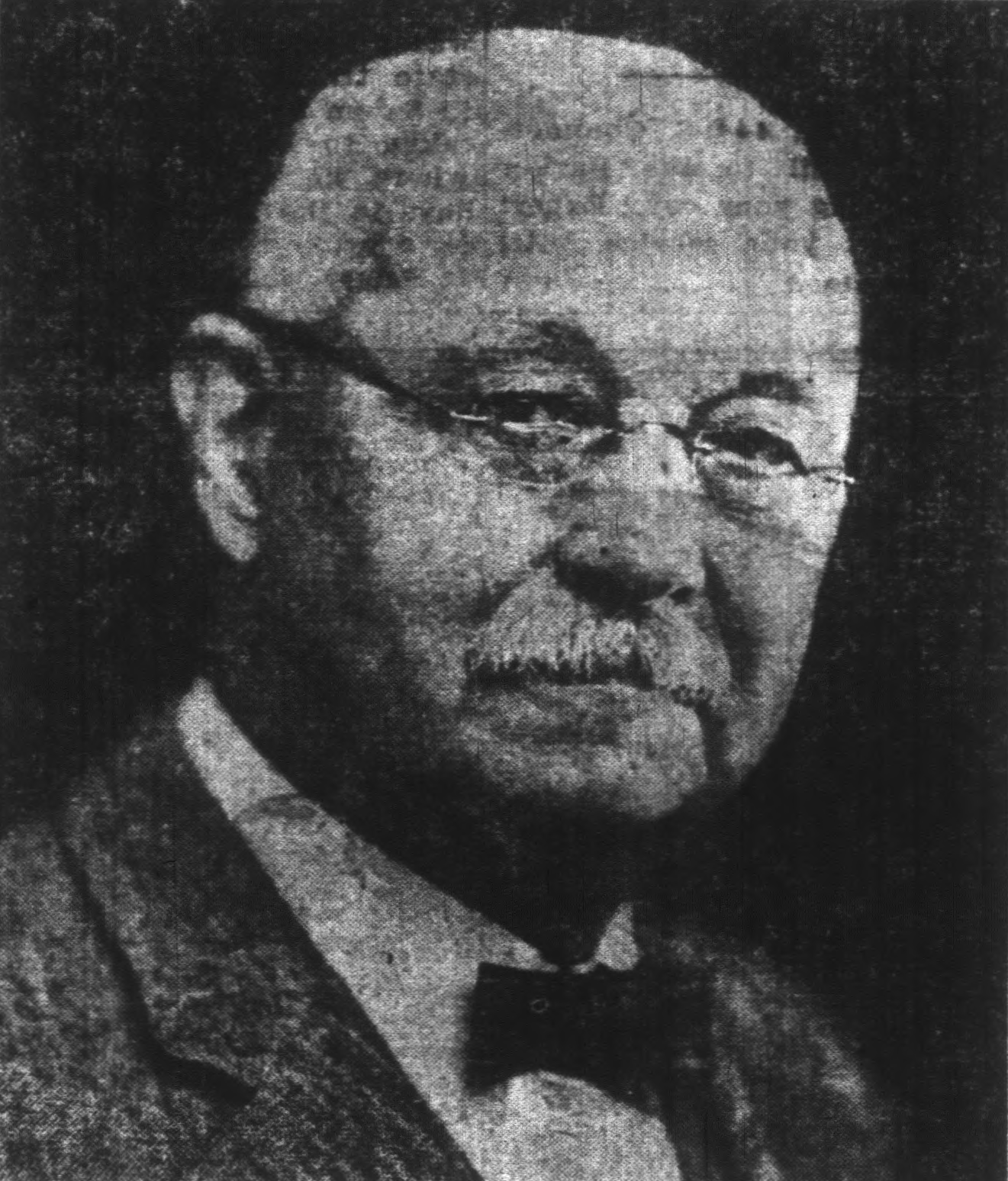
- Born: September 23, 1854; Contra Costa County, California, U.S.
- Died: November 18, 1941 (aged 87); Salem, Oregon, U.S.
- Spouse: Fannie Kay Bishop (m. 1876)
- Children: 3
- Relatives: Thomas L. Kay (father-in-law); Thomas B. Kay (brother-in-law)

Charles Pleasant Bishop (1854–1941) was an American businessman and politician. Bishop worked at several retail stores in Oregon as a young man before joining his father-in-law Thomas Lister Kay in establishing the Thomas Kay Woolen Mill in 1889. Bishop and his family later incorporated Pendleton Woolen Mills in 1909. In addition to his business career, Bishop served for three terms as mayor of Salem, Oregon, and served in the Oregon State Senate from 1915 to 1917.

== Biography ==
Bishop was born in Contra Costa County, California, on September 23, 1854. His family moved to Oregon in 1856, settling in Brownsville in 1861.

Bishop began working as a store clerk at Kirk & Hume in Brownsville in 1874, taking a position at the Brownsville Woolen Mill store two years later. In 1882, Bishop became a junior partner with Robert Glass and purchased a store in Crawfordsville, Oregon. He sold his interest in the partnership two years later and moved with his family to McMinnville, Oregon, to open a clothing store with his brother-in-law Thomas B. Kay.

In 1889, Bishop left his store in McMinnville and joined his father-in-law Thomas Lister Kay in establishing the Thomas Kay Woolen Mill in Salem, Oregon. Bishop and local businessman Squire Farrar served as directors of the newly incorporated firm, and Bishop's wife, Fannie Kay, also became deeply involved in running the business. In 1891, Bishop also purchased the Salem Woolen Mills store, a men's clothing retailer that served as an outlet for the mill's products.

Thomas Lister Kay died in 1900, and his son Thomas B. Kay was elected as president of the Thomas Kay Woolen Mill. Bishop resigned as director shortly thereafter, although he remained a stockholder in the company and maintained ownership of his clothing store in Salem.

In 1909, Bishop and his family incorporated Pendleton Woolen Mills in Pendleton, Oregon. Two of Bishop's sons moved to Pendleton to manage the company, while Bishop and his youngest son remained in Salem to manage the family's clothing store. Bishop would serve as president of Pendleton Woolen Mills until his death.

Bishop died in Salem on November 18, 1941. He was buried at City View Cemetery.

== Political career ==
Bishop served as mayor of Salem, Oregon, for three consecutive terms. (Note: His years in office are variously listed as 1889 to 1905, 1898 to 1904, or 1899 to 1903.) From 1915 to 1917, Bishop served in the Oregon State Senate as a Republican from Marion County.

== Personal life ==
Bishop married Martha Ann "Fannie" Kay on October 8, 1876. The couple had three sons: Clarence Morton Bishop (1878–1969), Royal "Roy" Thomas Bishop (1881–1950), and Robert Chauncey Bishop (1882–1927).
