= Edwin Durno =

American politician (1899–1976)

Edwin Russell Durno
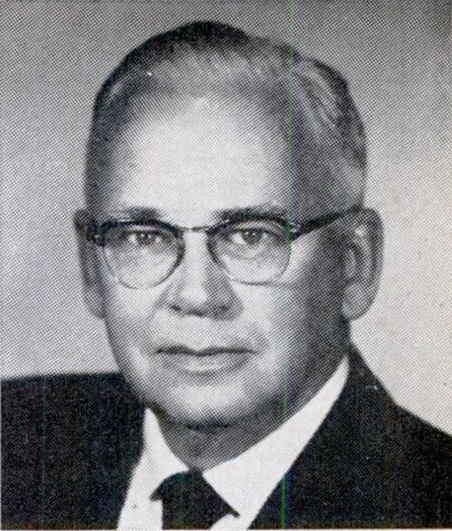
- From 1961's Pocket Congressional Directory of the Eighty-Seventh Congress

Member of the U.S. House of Representatives from Oregon's 4th district
- In office January 3, 1961 – January 3, 1963
- Preceded by: Charles O. Porter
- Succeeded by: Robert B. Duncan

Member of the Oregon Senate
- In office 1958–1960

Personal details
- Born: January 26, 1899 Linn County, Oregon, U.S.
- Died: November 20, 1976 (aged 77) Medford, Oregon, U.S.
- Party: Republican
- Occupation: physician

Edwin Russell Durno Jr. (January 26, 1899 – November 20, 1976) was a physician, politician, an infantry sergeant who was awarded a Purple Heart, and a basketball player recognized in the Oregon Sports Hall of Fame.

He was a Republican member of the United States House of Representatives representing Oregon's 4th congressional district from 1961 to 1963.

== Early life and basketball career ==
Durno was born on a farm in Linn County, Oregon, near Albany. He attended public schools in Silverton and attended the University of Oregon, where he starred on the Ducks' basketball team. Durno was the school's first basketball All-American and was a three-time All-Pacific Coast Conference selection. A prolific scorer, Durno led the Ducks to the 1919 conference title and was team captain during his senior year of 1921. He was inducted into the Oregon Sports Hall of Fame in 1981, and the University of Oregon Sports Hall of Fame in 1992.

Durno graduated from the University of Oregon with a Bachelor of Science degree in 1921 and went on to receive M.D. from Harvard Medical School in 1927, setting up a medical practice in Boston.

== Military and medical career ==
Durno served in both World War I (as an infantry sergeant) and World War II (in the Medical Corps) where he was awarded the Purple Heart for his service. Durno returned to Oregon after World War II where he practiced medicine in Medford and served on the Oregon Board of Medical Examiners from 1947 to 1958.

== Political career ==
In 1958, he was elected to the Oregon State Senate, and in 1960, was elected to the United States House of Representatives, unseating liberal Democrat Charles O. Porter. Doubtful of reelection in a politically marginal district, he did not seek reelection to the House in 1962, instead seeking the Republican nomination for Wayne Morse's seat in Oregon's 1962 U. S. Senate election. Durno lost the nomination to former state Treasurer Sig Unander. Durno was succeeded by Democrat Robert B. Duncan and returned to his medical practice in Medford, retiring from politics. Durno died in 1976.

U.S. House of Representatives
Preceded by Charles O. Porter	Member of the U.S. House of Representatives from Oregon's 4th congressional district 1961–1963	Succeeded by Robert B. Duncan
