= Phil Metschan =

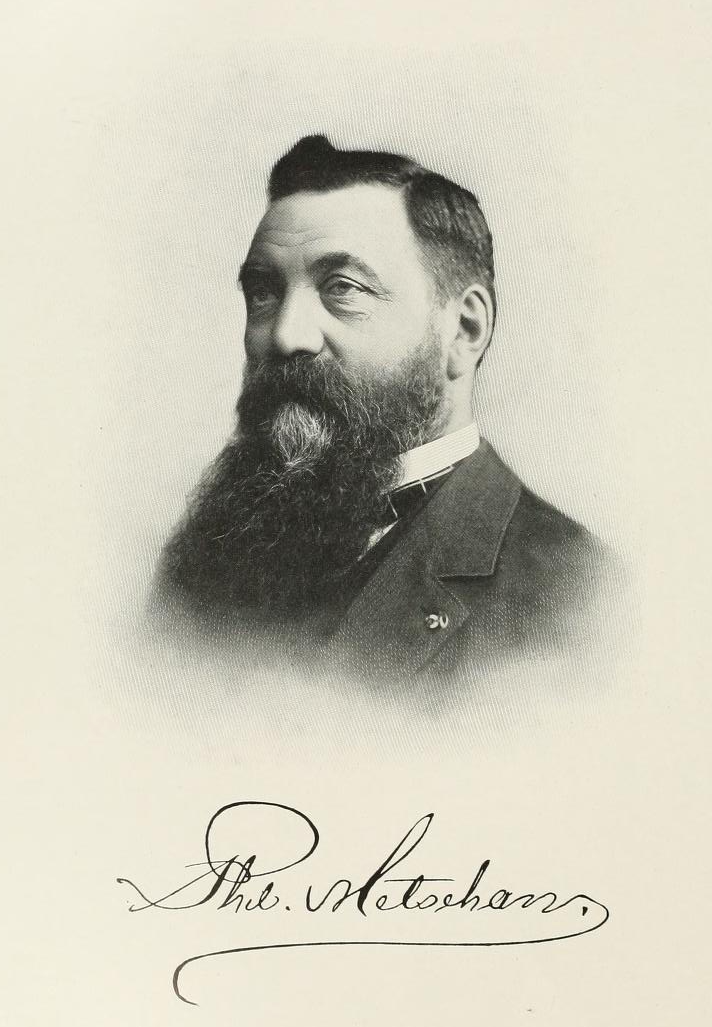
Phil Metschan

Phil Metschan (1840–1920) was a politician and business owner in the U.S. state of Oregon, serving as treasurer of Oregon. Originally from Germany, he immigrated to the United States in 1854. He lived in Ohio, Kansas, and Colorado before traveling west to Sacramento, California in 1861. He soon moved on to Portland, Oregon, where he ran a bakery until it was destroyed by the flood of 1862. He then ran a store in Canyon City and got his start in state politics. He married Maria (Marie) Catharina Schaume (1841–1895), a native of Germany who had immigrated in 1864, living first in San Francisco and then Canyon City.

Metschan served as Oregon State Treasurer from 1891-1899, and then bought the Imperial Hotel in Portland. His son, Phil Metschan Jr., helped him run the new Imperial Hotel, built in 1910. He had nine children, including Frank F. Metschan, Edward L. Metschan, Anna Metschan Cattanach, and Lillian Metschan Flanders (wife of Jesse Evans Flanders).

Phil Metschan, Jr. was selected as the Republican nominee for governor of Oregon in 1930, after the unexpected death of nominee George W. Joseph. He lost to Julius Meier, Joseph's law partner, who ran as an independent candidate.

Political offices
Preceded by G. W. Webb	Oregon State Treasurer; 1891–1899	Succeeded by Charles S. Moore
