= O. P. Hoff =

American politician

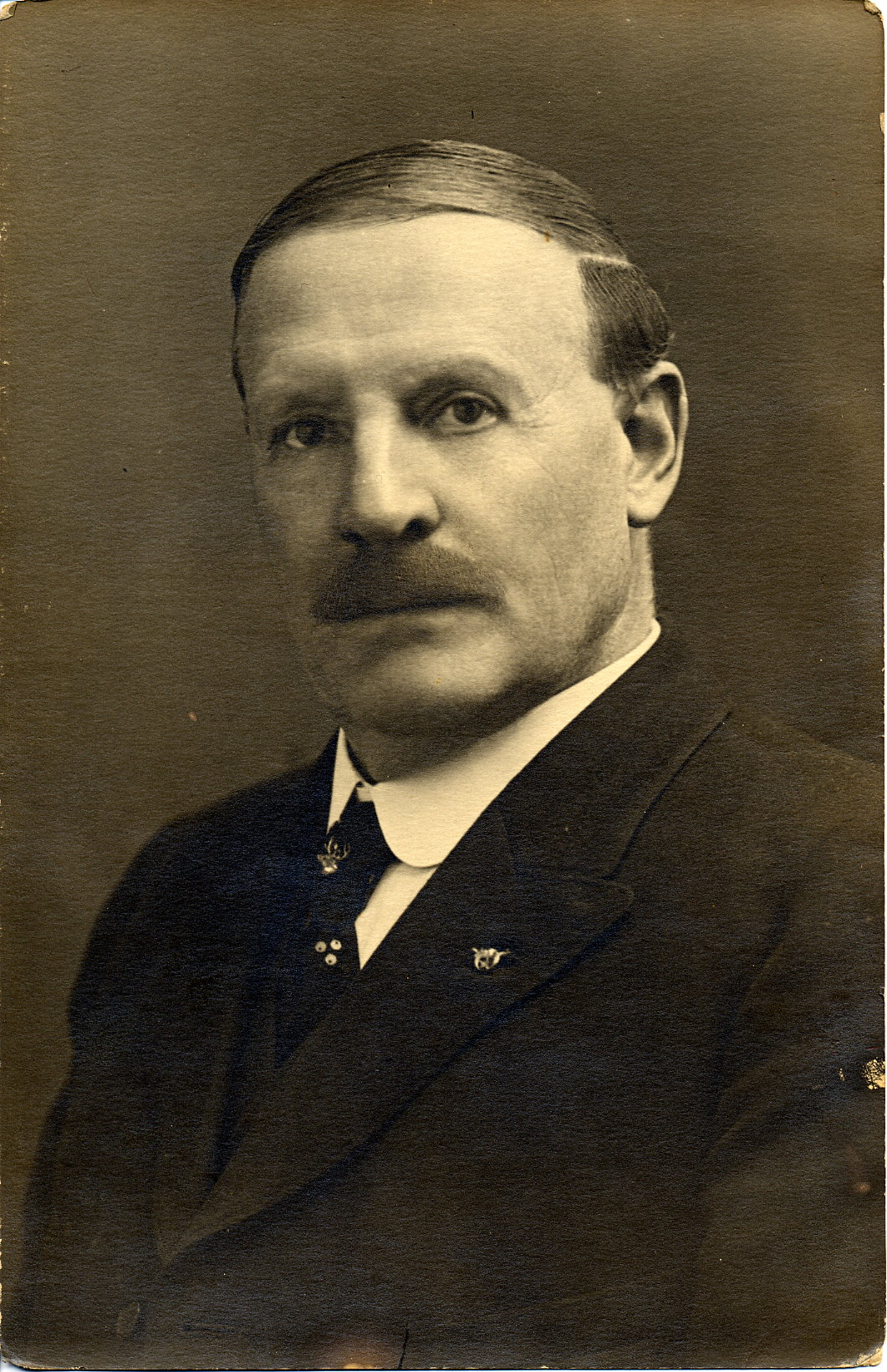

Oregon State Treasurer
- In office January 6, 1919 – March 18, 1924
- Governor: James Withycombe; Ben W. Olcott; Walter M. Pierce
- Preceded by: Thomas B. Kay
- Succeeded by: Jefferson Myers

Commissioner of the Oregon Bureau of Labor and Industries
- In office June 2, 1903 – January 6, 1919
- Governor: George E. Chamberlain; Frank W. Benson; Jay Bowerman; Oswald West; James Withycombe
- Preceded by: position created
- Succeeded by: Charles H. Gram

Personal details
- Born: May 17, 1853
- Died: March 18, 1924 (aged 70) Oregon
- Party: Republican

Ole P. Hoff (May 17, 1853 – March 18, 1924) was a Norwegian-American Republican politician and the first commissioner of labor in the U.S. state of Oregon. Hoff was the sole employee of the Bureau of Labor Statistics and Inspector of Factories and Workshops (now the Oregon Bureau of Labor and Industries) when he was appointed commissioner after the bureau's creation by the state legislature on June 2, 1903. He served as Labor Commissioner until 1919, when he became the Oregon State Treasurer. He died in office on March 18, 1924.

== Early life ==
Ole P. Hoff was born in Hadeland, Norway on May 17, 1853. After leaving Norway in 1870, he first settled in Oshkosh, Wisconsin, then in California before briefly coming to Oregon in 1875. He returned to California until 1879, when he settled permanently in Oregon. From 1870 to 1879 he worked in farming, logging, mill work and mining. In 1881 he started 13 years of work as a railroad agent, and also worked as a postmaster during this time. He married Cynthia Alice Parsons in Eugene on May 13, 1880; they had two children, who were born in Irving, Oregon. He was a member of the Elks and Masons, and the Masonic orders of the Shrine and Knights Templar. He was also a member of the Woodmen of the World.

== Labor commissioner ==
Hoff was the first leader of the Oregon Bureau of Labor and Industries (BOLI) to conduct safety inspections of factories. In 1906, he reported that 653 of the 673 factories inspected had dangerous or unsafe conditions, but he won the authority to fine violators and force compliance with safety laws. Under Hoff's leadership of BOLI, Oregon created the first enforceable minimum wage law in the United States, enacted a child labor law, and pursued a shorter 10-hour working day for women. He was also an advocate for teachers, whom he called "about the poorest paid class of wage earners in the state." After his appointment by Governor Chamberlain in 1903, Hoff was elected to the position for a full four-year term in 1906 and reelected in 1910 and 1914. He continued in office until January 6, 1919, and was replaced by Charles H. Gram who had been elected in 1918.

== State treasurer ==
Hoff was elected state treasurer in 1918 and reelected in 1922. He died in office on March 18, 1924, at the age of 70 at Emanuel Hospital in Portland, Oregon. Oregon Governor Pierce named Jefferson Myers as his successor the same day of Hoff's death.

Political offices
Preceded by Thomas B. Kay	Treasurer of Oregon; 1919–1924	Succeeded by Jefferson Myers
