= Pendleton Woolen Mills =

American textile manufacturing company

- Company type: Private
- Industry: Textile industry
- Predecessor: Pendleton Wool-Scouring and Packing Company
- Founded: 1909; 117 years ago in Pendleton, Oregon, U.S. (Note: Pendleton Woolen Mills was incorporated in 1909 under the ownership of the Bishop family. A predecessor company, the Pendleton Wool-Scouring and Packing Company, was incorporated in 1893. The company expanded from a wool scouring operation to a full woolen mill in 1895 before eventually becoming idle. 1895 is given as the year of establishment for Pendleton Woolen Mills in some sources.)
- Founders: Bishop family (Note: Consisting of Charles Pleasant Bishop, Fannie Kay Bishop and their three sons—Clarence Morton, Royal "Roy" Thomas, and Robert Chauncey.)
- Headquarters: Portland, Oregon, U.S.
- Products: Woolen blankets, fabric, and clothing
- Website: www.pendleton-usa.com

Pendleton Woolen Mills is an American textile manufacturing company headquartered in Portland, Oregon. Incorporated in 1909 in Pendleton, Oregon, the company is known for its woolen blankets and clothing.

== History ==
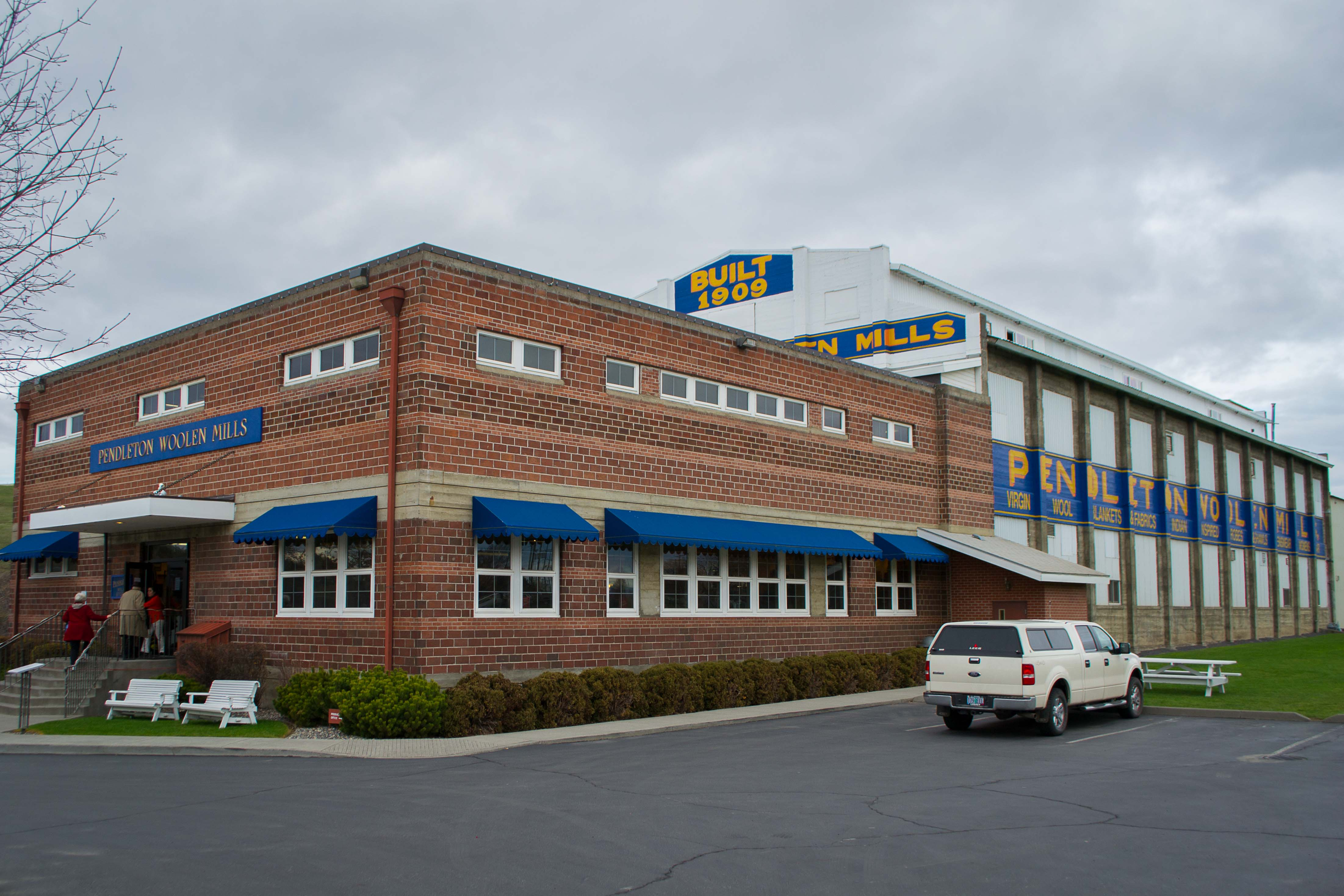
The company's Pendleton facility in 2012, at the site of the original mill

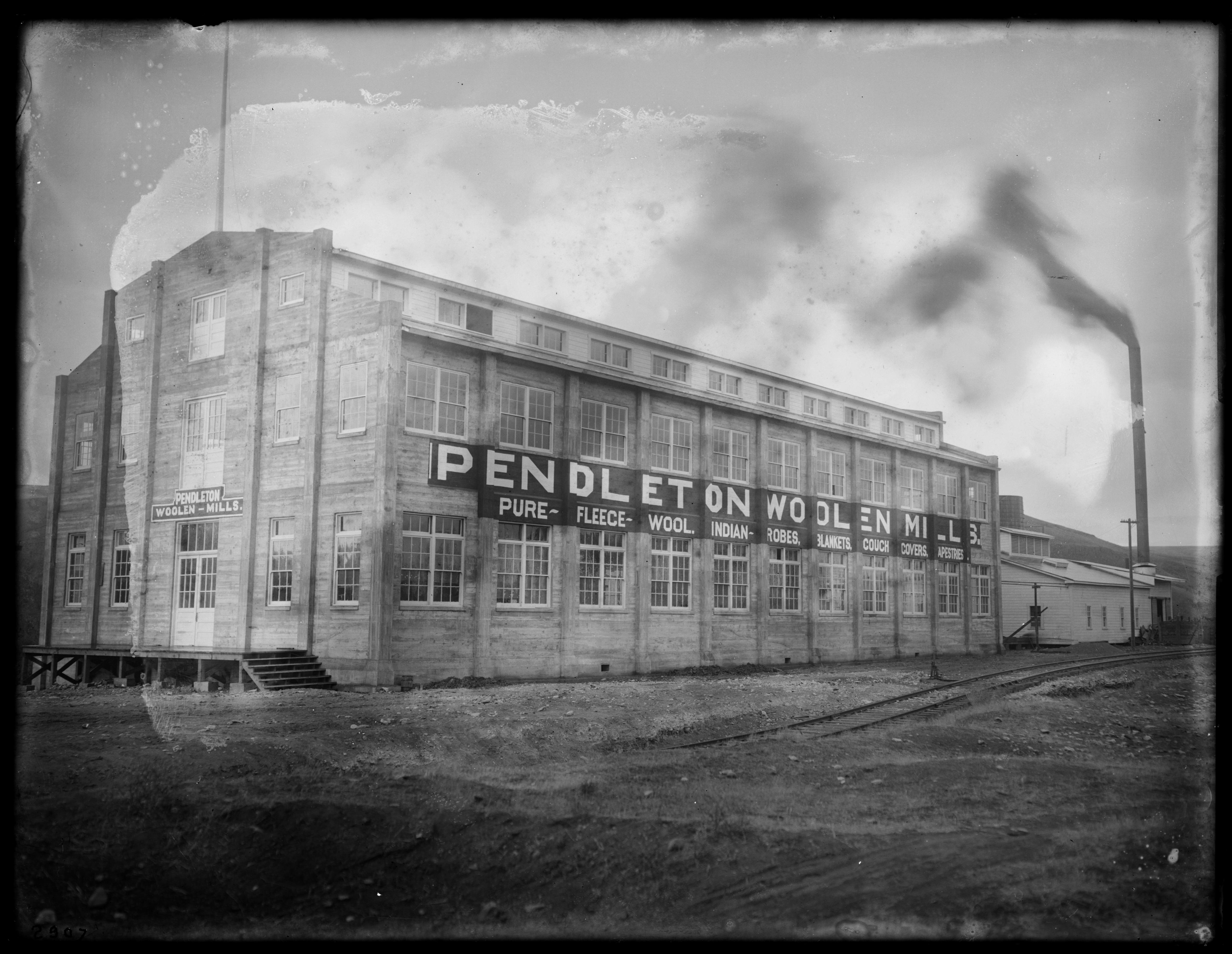
Pendleton Woolen Mills c. 1910

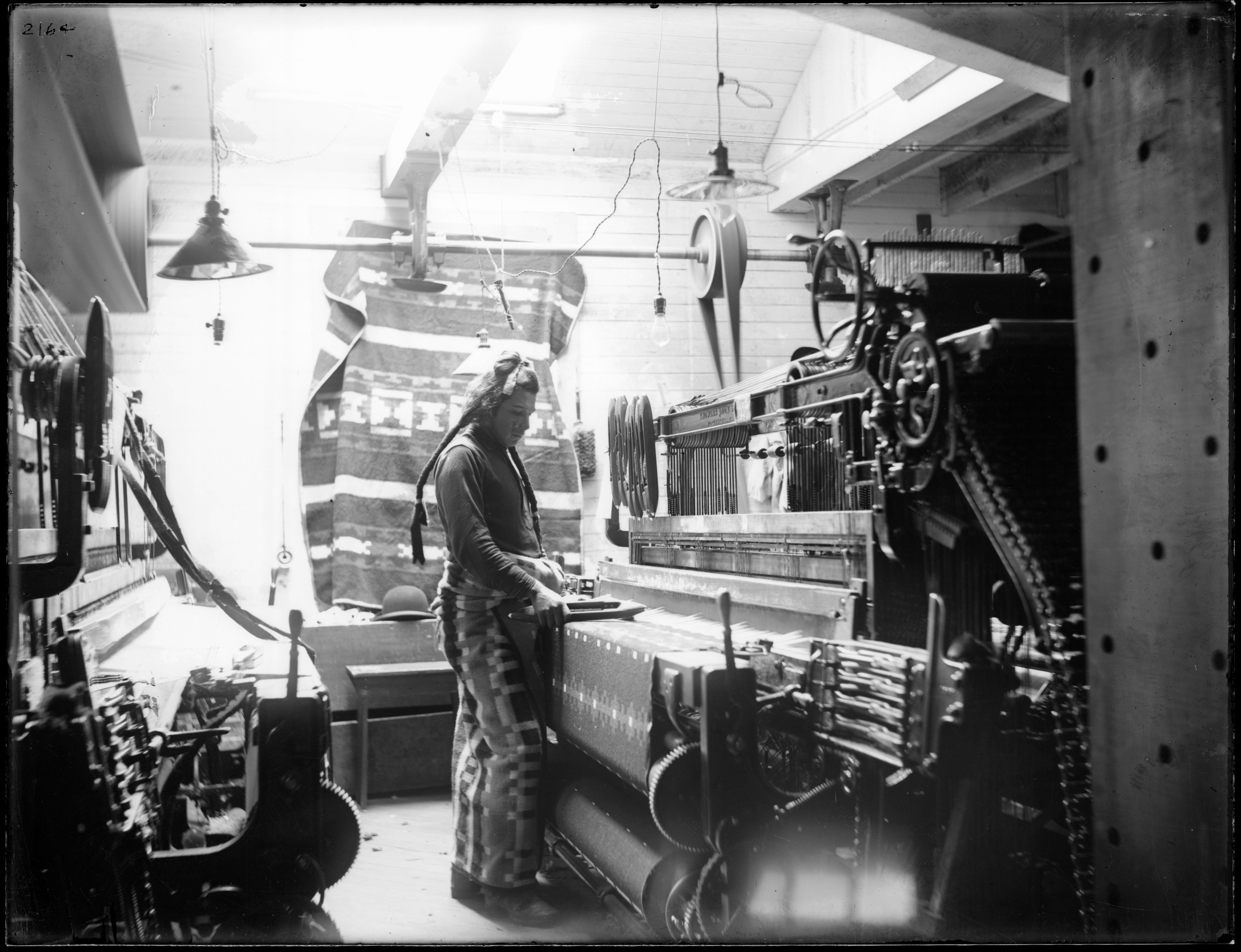
A Native American man operates a loom at Pendleton Woolen Mills, photographed by Lee Moorhouse

=== As Pendleton Wool-Scouring and Packing Company ===
In 1893, the Pendleton Wool-Scouring and Packing Company was established in Pendleton, Oregon, as a wool scouring plant, where raw wool was scrubbed and packed before shipping out to textile mills in the area. In 1895, it was enlarged and converted into a textile mill that, by the following year, had begun making Native American trade blankets—geometric patterned robes (unfringed blankets) for Native American men and shawls (fringed blankets) for Native American women in the area—the Umatilla, Cayuse, Nez Perce and Walla Walla tribes. That business eventually failed and the plant stood idle until the Bishop family, spurred by Fannie Kay Bishop, purchased it.

Martha Ann "Fannie" Kay was the daughter of Thomas Lister Kay, an English-born weaver who founded the Thomas Kay Woolen Mill in Salem, Oregon. Kay introduced Fannie to the operation and management of his mill. In 1876, Fannie married retail merchant Charles Pleasant Bishop. The Bishops passed their expertise and knowledge to their three sons: Clarence Morton, Royal "Roy" Thomas, and Robert Chauncey.

=== Incorporation as Pendleton Woolen Mills ===
In 1909, the Bishop family reopened the defunct Pendleton Woolen Mills. When the Bishops assumed ownership, they built a new mill with the help of the town of Pendleton, which issued bonds for the mill's construction. The town of Pendleton was a major railhead for the Columbia River Plateau and allowed convenient shipping for the growing business. Pendleton photographer Walter S. Bowman captured early-twentieth century images of the mill's interior, exterior and its workers.

=== Expansion ===
The company began to expand their product line into other woolen textile products and later into apparel. In 1912 the company opened a weaving mill in Washougal, Washington, for the production of woolen fabrics used in suits and other clothing.

The company moved its headquarters to Portland, Oregon, in 1919.

One of the original three Bishop sons, Clarence Morton Bishop—usually known as "C.M."—started a new product line of men's woolen sport shirts in bright colors and patterns. Prior to that time woolen shirts had been considered work shirts and came in mostly dull colors. In 1924 the company began producing men's woolen sport shirts and by 1929 the company was producing a full line of woolen sportswear.

The second Bishop son, Roy, had left the company in 1918 to form his own company, the Oregon Worsted Company. The third son, Chauncey, died in 1927. This left C.M. with the sole responsibility for management of both woolen mills.

During World War II, 1941–45, Pendleton Woolen Mills devoted most of its production to blankets and fabric for uniforms and clothing for the US military services.

In 1949, after postwar market research showed a desire for women's sportswear, the company introduced a line of wool clothing for women and the '49er jacket proved extremely popular. The reversible pleated "Turnabout Skirt" was also popular, comprising two-skirts-in-one.

In 1961, a little-known singing group known as the Pendletones was formed, taking their name from the classic Pendleton wool plaid shirt. This group later changed their name to The Beach Boys and the Pendleton shirt became popular among American youth.

In 1972 the company again expanded its product line with the introduction of non-wool garments for men and women. Many customers had a desire for the classic Pendleton style for 'year round wear, but wanted lighter clothing for spring and summer wear. Again the new line was a major success.

== Blankets ==
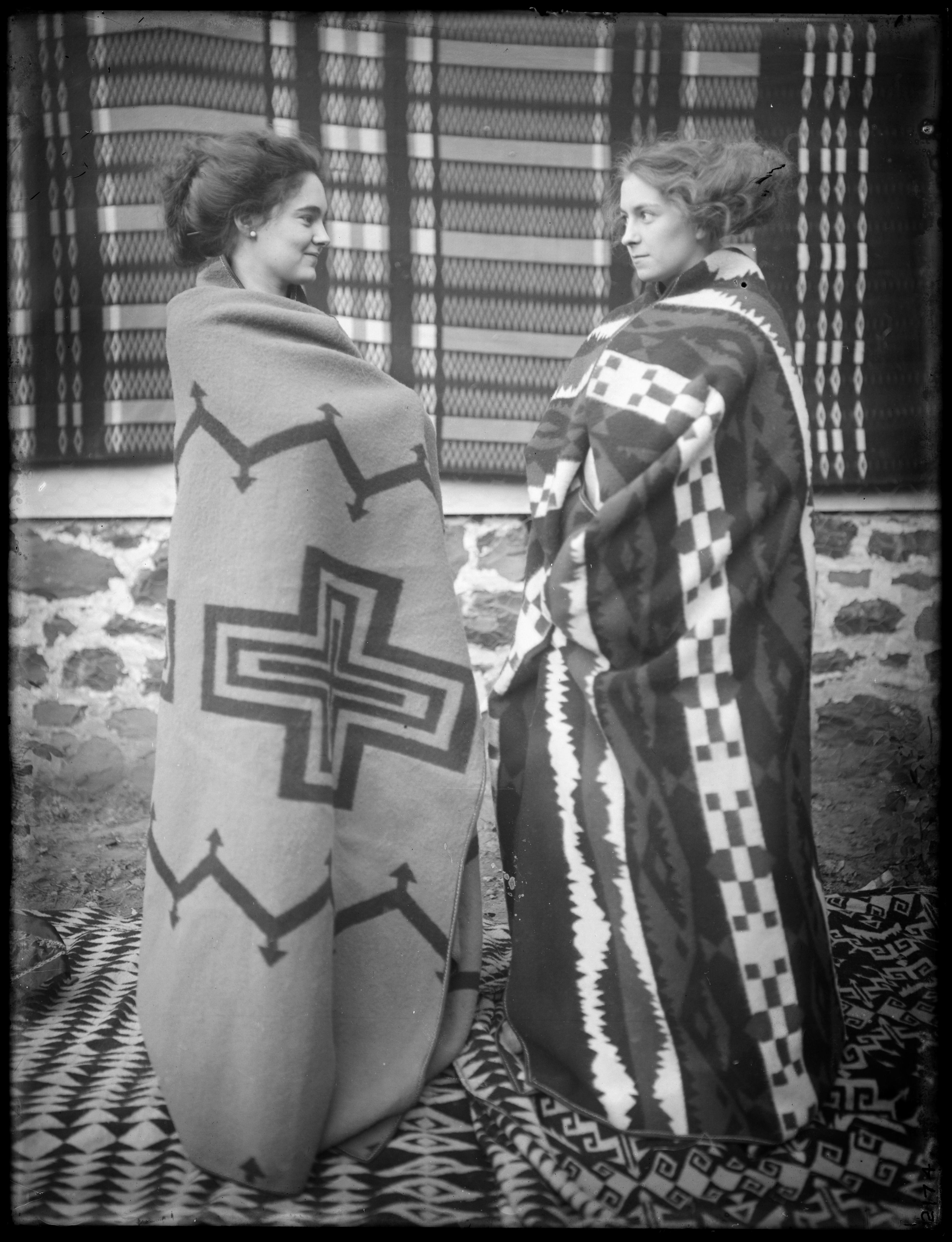
Two women stand wrapped in Pendleton Woolen Mills blankets, photographed by Lee Moorhouse

The family resumed the production of Jacquard blankets and introduced new designs, colors, and patterns to their product line. They also changed the construction of the mill's blankets. Prior to 1909 the blankets had round corners. The Bishop blankets featured square corners.

The company expanded their trade from the local indigenous tribes of the Columbia River area to the Navajo, Hopi, and Zuni peoples of the American Southwest. To do this, they enlisted the help of designer Joe Rawnsley, who visited tribes to learn their customs and color preferences. Like many other mills of the day, Pendleton also emulated the multicolor patterns of candy-stripe blankets, like those found on Hudson's Bay point blankets for their Glacier National Park blanket. The Pendleton blankets became not only basic wearing apparel, but also were standards of trading and ceremonial use.

== Retail distribution ==
Throughout the company's history its products had been sold in specialty stores and selected department stores, including, Charles Pleasant Bishop's original clothing store in Salem. In the 1980s Pendleton entered the retail business with a chain of company-owned and affiliated stores that sold the full line of Pendleton products. The company also began a direct to consumer catalog business and expanded into an ecommerce platform in the 1990s.

Pendleton labels have evolved over time, with blue labels signifying men's garments and white labels indicating women's apparel. A label displaying the Woolmark symbol dates from 1964 or later.

== Present operations ==
Pendleton Woolen Mills is a privately held company headquartered in Portland, Oregon. The company operates retail stores across the United States and also sells its products in Europe, Australia, Canada, and Japan.

== See also ==
- Cowichan knitting – Indigenous garment style adapted by Pendleton
- Portland Woolen Mills – Defunct textile manufacturer in Portland, Oregon
