= 1962 United States Senate election in Oregon =

- November 8, 1962
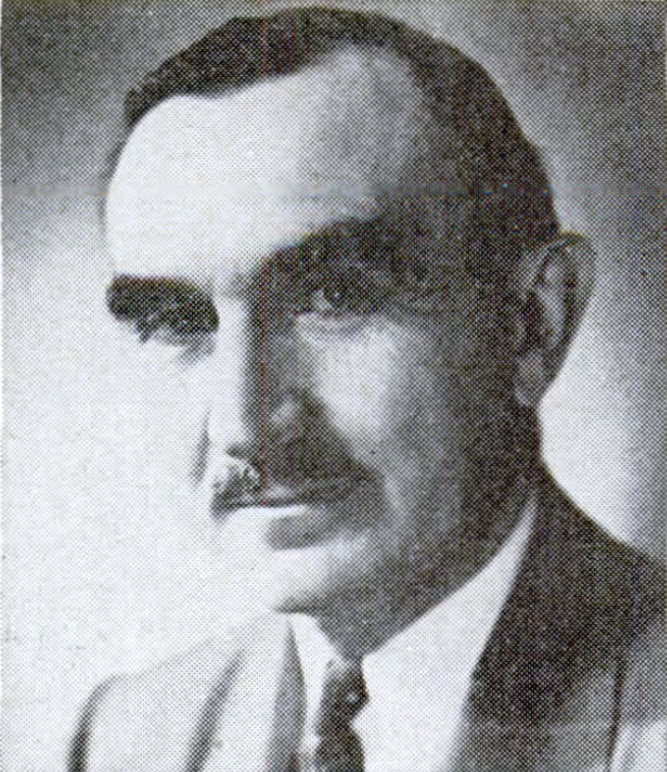

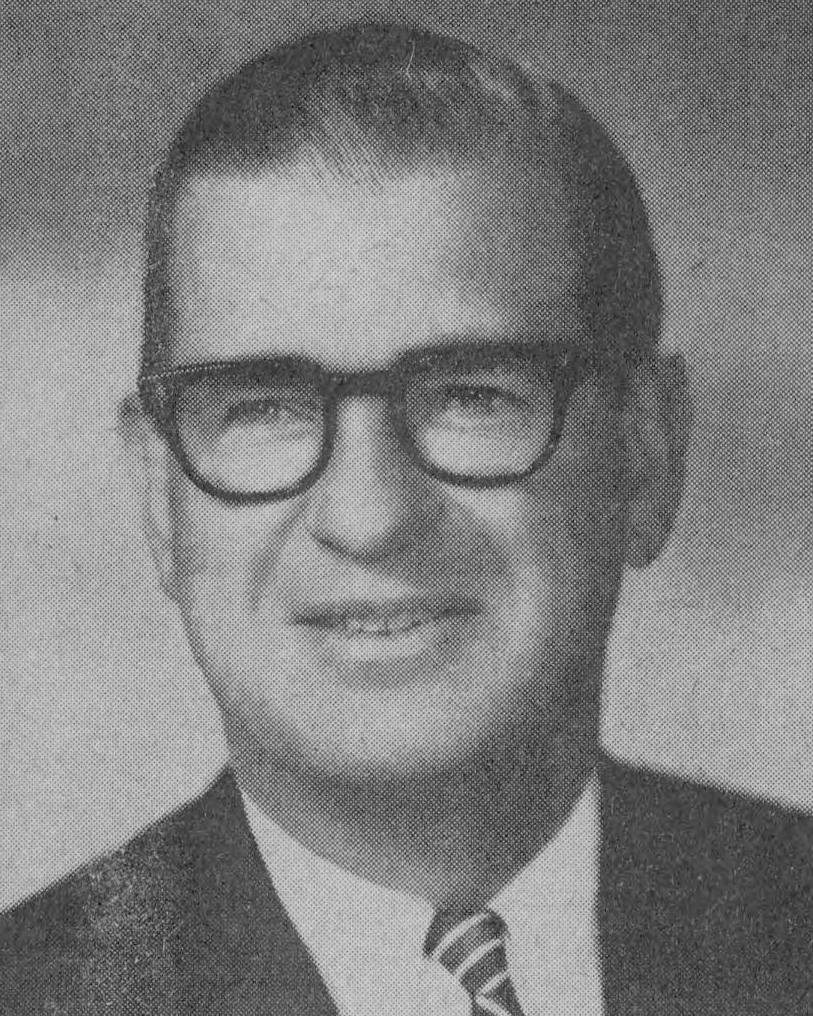
Nominee	Wayne Morse	Sig Unander
Party	Democratic	Republican
Popular vote	344,716	291,587
Percentage	54.15%	45.81%
- County results Morse: 50–60% 60–70% Unander: 50–60% 60–70%
U.S. senator before election
Wayne Morse
Democratic
Elected U.S. Senator
Wayne Morse
Democratic

The 1962 United States Senate election in Oregon was held on November 8, 1962, to select the U.S. Senator from the state of Oregon. Democratic Senator Wayne Morse decided to seek re-election for a fourth term. He defeated Republican candidate Sig Unander in the general election. This would be the last time Democrats won the Class 3 Senate seat from Oregon until Ron Wyden's victory in the 1996 special election.

== Candidates ==
=== Democratic ===
- Wayne Morse – incumbent Senator since 1945

=== Republican ===
- Sig Unander – Oregon State Treasurer (1953–1959)
- Edwin Durno – U.S. Representative

== Results ==
United States Senate election in Oregon, 1962
Party	Candidate	Votes	%
Democratic	Wayne Morse (incumbent)	344,716	54.15%
Republican	Sig Unander	291,587	45.81%
None	write-ins	253	0.04%
Total votes		636,556	100.00%
Democratic hold			
