= Charles O. Porter =

American politician

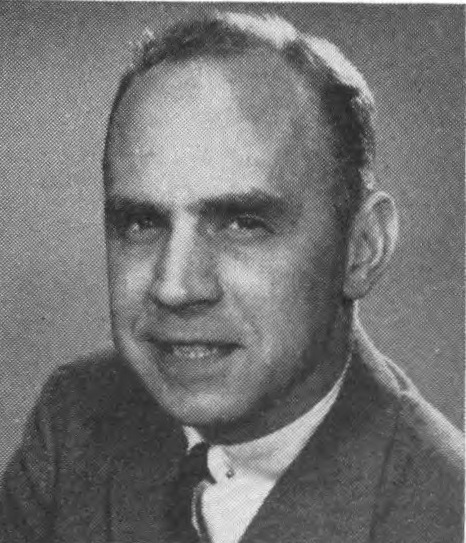
- From 1957's Pocket Congressional Directory of the Eighty-Fifth Congress.

Member of the U.S. House of Representatives from Oregon's 4th district
- In office January 3, 1957 – January 3, 1961
- Preceded by: Harris Ellsworth
- Succeeded by: Edwin Russell Durno

Personal details
- Born: April 4, 1919 Klamath Falls, Oregon, U.S.
- Died: January 1, 2006 (aged 86) Eugene, Oregon, U.S.
- Party: Democratic
- Spouse: Priscilla Porter
- Occupation: Attorney

Charles Orlando Porter (April 4, 1919 – January 1, 2006) was an American lawyer, World War II veteran, and politician from the U.S. state of Oregon. He served in the United States House of Representatives for two terms from 1957 to 1961.

== Early life ==
Born in Klamath Falls, Oregon, to Frank Porter and Ruth Peterson, he graduated from high school in Eugene, Oregon and then went on to graduate from Harvard University with a B.S. in 1941. From there he went on to serve in the United States Army during World War II from 1941 to 1945. He then went back to Harvard Law School and graduated with an LL.B. in 1947. At Harvard Law, he partnered with several other returning veterans to found the Harvard Law Record, using the nascent paper to argue for more student housing.

== Congressional career ==
He entered politics when he ran for the Congressional Representative for Oregon's 4th congressional district as a Democrat in 1954. He lost that race, but he ran again in 1956. In a major upset, he narrowly defeated incumbent Republican Harris Ellsworth. He and academic Robert J. Alexander wrote the book The Struggle for Democracy in Latin America, published in 1961.

During his time in Congress, Porter gained a reputation as a fervent liberal. He backed admitting the People's Republic of China to the United Nations, opening trade with them, and halting nuclear testing. Partly as a result, he was defeated for reelection in 1960 by Republican Edwin R. Durno.

Porter made many attempts to return to Congress: in 1964, losing the Democratic primary to Robert Duncan, 1966, 1972, and 1976. In 1980, he ran in the Democratic primary for the election for one of Oregon's Senate seats, losing to state Senator Ted Kulongoski.

Resuming the practice of law in Eugene, Porter was one of the main proponents for the removal of a Latin cross from Skinner Butte in Eugene. He also fought against building a nuclear power plant near Eugene, advocated for the decriminalization of marijuana, and was opposed to the Vietnam War. Following the death of his friend, former Oregon Senator Wayne Morse, in 1974, Porter led the effort to establish the Wayne Morse Chair of Law and Politics at the University of Oregon, where Morse had once worked. In 2001, he wrote a resolution calling for the impeachment of the five "transparently political" Supreme Court justices who halted the 2000 presidential election recount in Florida.

== Personal ==
Porter was married to Priscilla Porter, who died in 2002. They had four children: Don, Chris, Sam, and Anne. He died on New Year's Day, 2006, in Eugene, of Alzheimer's disease.

U.S. House of Representatives
Preceded by Harris Ellsworth	Member of the U.S. House of Representatives from Oregon's 4th congressional district 1957-1961	Succeeded by Edwin Russell Durno
