= George A. Steel (Oregon politician) =

American politician

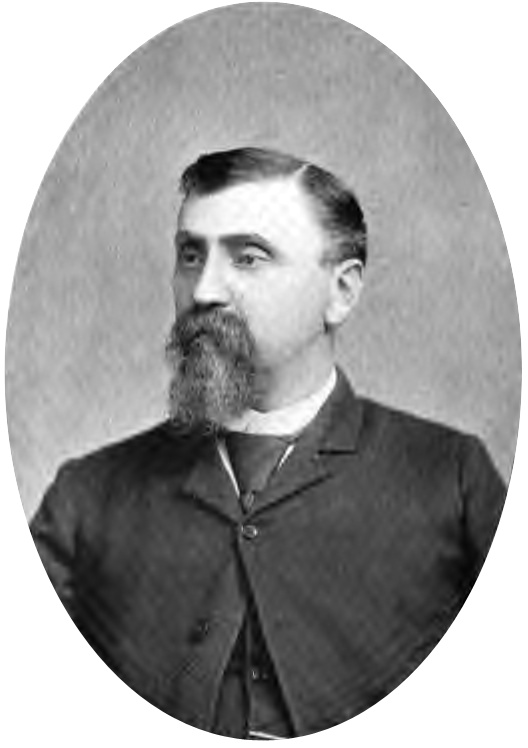

Oregon State Treasurer
- In office January 15, 1907– January 3, 1911
- Governor: George Earle Chamberlain; Frank W. Benson
- Preceded by: Charles S. Moore
- Succeeded by: Thomas B. Kay

Oregon State Senator
- In office 1887 – 1891
- Constituency: Multnomah County

Personal details
- Born: April 22, 1846 Stafford, Ohio
- Died: June 20, 1918 (aged 72)
- Party: Republican
- Spouse: Eva Pope
- Relations: William Gladstone Steel
- Occupation: Businessman

George A. Steel (April 22, 1846 – June 20, 1918) was an American politician and businessman in the state of Oregon. A native of Ohio, he moved to Oregon in 1862 where he became postmaster of Portland and helped build a railroad line among other business ventures. A Republican, he served in the Oregon State Senate and as Oregon State Treasurer.

== Early years ==
George Steel was born on April 22, 1846, to William and Elizabeth Lawrie Steel in the village of Stafford in the southeastern portion of Ohio. In 1862, he sailed to the Isthmus of Panama and then traveled on a ship captained by J.D. Merryman to Portland, Oregon. There he first worked at a commission house as a clerk before working in the same position for the post office in Portland in 1865. He then worked for the Oregon Iron Works followed by the Ladd & Tilton bank for four years as an accountant. On February 18, 1869, Steel married Eva Pope, daughter of Charles Pope.

Steel formed a partnership in the book and stationery business with Joseph K. Gill to operate Gill & Steel, a predecessor to the J. K. Gill Company, in 1870. The next year they bought part of the Harris & Holman business and later bought out Bancroft & Morse, with Bancroft joining the partnership. Steel bought out his partners, but went bankrupt and sold off the assets. The rest of Steel's family, which included brother William Gladstone Steel, moved to Oregon in 1872. Steel continued to work with Gill until 1878, and became the postmaster for Portland in 1881.

In the meantime he was a special agent for the United States Post Office Department (predecessor to the United States Postal Service) from 1877 to 1879, and from that year to 1880 as a deputy collector at for Customs at the city's harbor. He served as postmaster until 1885, and was again postmaster from 1889 to 1894. While still postmaster he went into business with his brother James to form G. A. Steel & Company to sell fire insurance. Steel continued with this venture after leaving the post office and later incorporated the Metropolitan Railway Company with his brother. The railroad was an electric line that opened in January 1890 and initially ran from Portland to Fulton Park. Later named the East Side Railway, the line extended to Oregon City, but went bankrupt in 1898.

== Political career ==
In 1870, he won election to his first public office, Treasurer of Multnomah County, serving two years. He then was elected as chairman of the Oregon Republican Party's state central committee in 1876. Steel remained chairman until 1878 when he became the secretary for the committee.

Steel was elected to the Oregon State Senate in 1886 to represent District 20 in Multnomah County. He served one, four-year term in the legislature spanning two legislative sessions. He returned to the post of chairman for the state central committee in 1894, serving until 1896, and then began service on the Republican National Committee in 1900. He remained on that committee in 1902 and 1904. In 1906, he was elected as the Oregon State Treasurer and served a single four-year term in office from January 15, 1907, to January 3, 1911.

== Later years and legacy ==
Steel and his wife had two children and were members of the First Congregational Church in Portland. George A. Steel died on June 20, 1918, at the age of 72. Steel named an area south of Portland as Stafford after his hometown, which also lends its name to Stafford Road in that same area.

Political offices
Preceded by Charles S. Moore	Treasurer of Oregon; 1907–1911	Succeeded by Thomas B. Kay
