= Sig Unander =

American politician

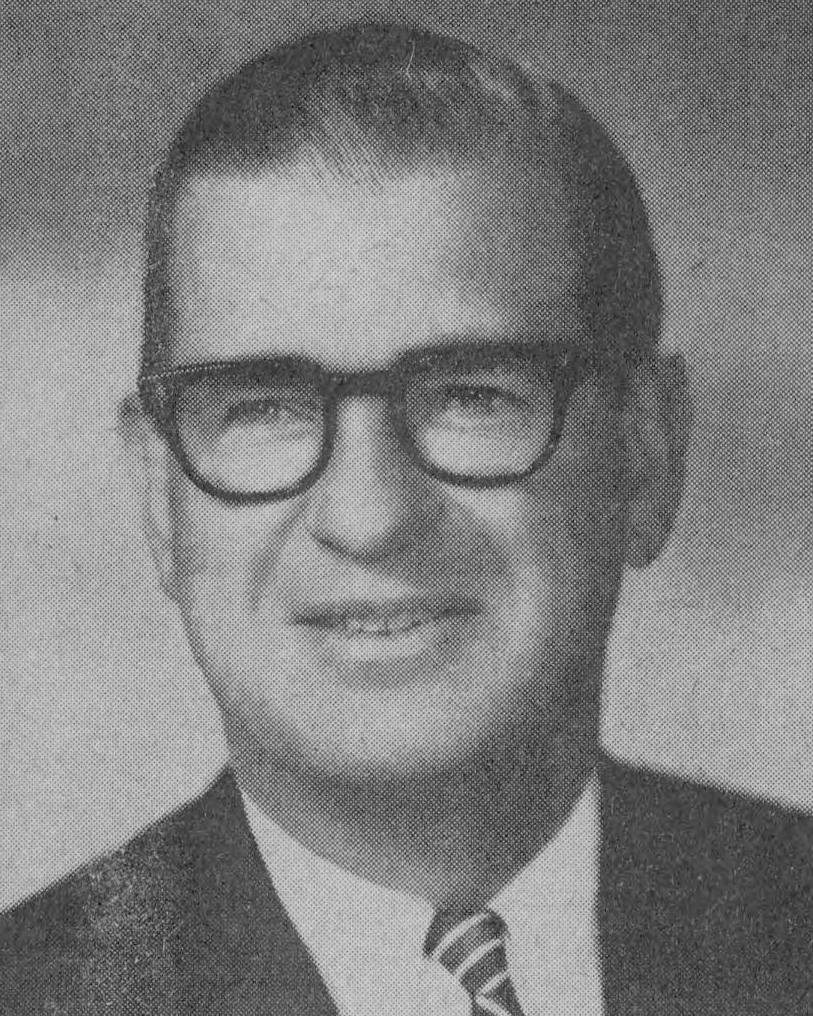

Oregon State Treasurer
- In office January 5, 1953 – December 31, 1959
- Preceded by: Walter J. Pearson
- Succeeded by: Howard C. Belton

Personal details
- Born: August 3, 1913 Portland, Oregon, US
- Died: February 1, 1978 (aged 64) Portland, Oregon, US
- Party: Republican
- Spouse: Vivian
- Children: Sigfrid Jr., Astrid
- Education: Stanford University (BA, MBA)

Sigfrid Benson "Sig" Unander (August 3, 1913 – February 1, 1978) was an American politician who served two terms as Treasurer of the state of Oregon from 1952 to 1959. A Republican, Unander was his party's nominee for United States Senate in 1962 and unsuccessfully sought the party nomination for Governor of Oregon in 1958.

== Early life ==
Unander was born in Portland, Oregon on August 3, 1913, to Sigfrid M. and Caroline Benson Unander, a daughter of Portland businessman and philanthropist Simon Benson. He studied political science at Stanford University, where he earned a Bachelor of Arts, and later an MBA from the Stanford Graduate School of Business.

Unander served in the United States Army during World War II, attaining the rank of lieutenant colonel and earning two medals from the United States and four from other Allied Nations while serving in Europe, Africa, and the Southwest Pacific.

== Political career ==
Prior to serving in World War II, Unander was executive assistant to Republican Oregon Governor Charles A. Sprague. Upon his return from the war, he remained active in Republican politics, serving as treasurer of the party's State Central Committee and vice chairman of the Oregon Republican Club. He was a member of the Young Republicans and a precinct committeeman.

In 1948, he sought the Republican nomination for the position of Oregon State Treasurer, but lost the primary election to State Senator Howard Belton by just 1,348 votes. In 1952, Unander again ran for the office, and this time secured his party's nominee and defeated Democrat Francis Lambert in the general election to become Oregon's 18th State Treasurer. In 1956, he defeated Wiley Smith to win re-election by a wide margin.

Unander's convincing re-election made him the early favorite for the Republican nomination in the upcoming 1958 Oregon gubernatorial election to face Democratic incumbent Robert D. Holmes, who had narrowly won a special election two years earlier. But with many Republicans concerned that Unander was too conservative to get elected, the more moderate Oregon Secretary of State Mark Hatfield entered the race, earning the nomination and eventually the governorship.

In 1959, Unander resigned as Treasurer to accept an appointment to the United States Federal Maritime Board where he served as vice chairman.

Unander returned to Oregon to run in the 1962 United States Senate election. He defeated Congressman Edwin Durno to become the Republican nominee, but lost in the general election to three-term Democratic Senator Wayne Morse. In the 1966 Senate election, Unander crossed party lines to endorse Democrat Robert B. Duncan over Republican Hatfield due to Hatfield's opposition to the Vietnam War.

== Personal life ==
Unander and his wife Vivian had two children. He died in Portland on February 1, 1978, of a heart attack.

Political offices
Preceded by Walter J. Pearson	Treasurer of Oregon; 1952–1959	Succeeded by Howard Belton
Party political offices
Preceded by Douglas McKay	Republican nominee for U.S. Senator from Oregon (Class 3); 1962	Succeeded by Bob Packwood
