= John D. Boon =

American politician (1817–1864)

4th and 6th Treasurer of the Oregon Territory
- In office December 16, 1851 – January 24, 1855
- Preceded by: William W. Buck
- Succeeded by: Nathaniel H. Lane
- In office January 10, 1856 – March 3, 1859
- Preceded by: Nathaniel H. Lane
- Succeeded by: himself (as Oregon State Treasurer)

1st Oregon State Treasurer
- In office March 3, 1859 – September 8, 1862
- Preceded by: himself (as Treasurer of the Oregon Territory)
- Succeeded by: Edwin N. Cooke

Personal details
- Born: January 8, 1817 Athens, Ohio, U.S.
- Died: July 17, 1864 (aged 47) Salem, Oregon, U.S.
- Party: Democratic
- Spouse: Martha J. Hawkins

John Daniel Boon (January 8, 1817 – July 17, 1864) was an American merchant and politician in what became the state of Oregon. A native of Ohio, he immigrated to the Oregon Country where he farmed and later operated a general store. A Democrat, he served as the Treasurer of the Oregon Territory and was the first Oregon State Treasurer. His former home and store are both listed on the National Register of Historic Places.

== Early life ==
John Boon was born and raised in Athens, Ohio, on January 8, 1817. In Ohio he was a member of the Baptist church, and in 1842 he joined the Wesleyan denomination of the Methodist Episcopal Church and trained as a minister. Boon married Martha J. Hawkins and they had seven children together. In 1845, the family moved to the Oregon Country where he settled in the Willamette Valley. In Oregon he farmed and worked at Lewis H. Judson's sawmill (formerly the Methodist Mission's sawmill) the before opening a mercantile in Salem. As a minister he married later Senator James Nesmith to Pauline Goff in 1845.

== Political career ==
In 1846, Boon served a term in the Provisional Legislature of Oregon, representing Polk County. While living in the Rickreall area of the county, he would occasionally preach at the Jefferson Institute, an early school and meeting place. In 1851, Boon was elected by the Oregon Territorial Legislature to the position of Territorial Treasurer. A Democrat, he served from December 16, 1851, until March 1, 1855, when Nathaniel H. Lane replaced him in that office. After a single term out of office, the legislature returned Boon to the treasury where he served from January 10, 1856, until March 3, 1859, when the office was dissolved with Oregon’s admittance to the Union as the 33rd state. Boon had been elected to the position of State Treasurer in 1858 to take effect upon statehood, with him also assuming that office on March 3. He operated the treasury out of his general store on what was called Boon’s Island. His term ended on September 8, 1862, thus he was the last treasurer of the Oregon Territory and the first of the state of Oregon.

== Later years and family ==
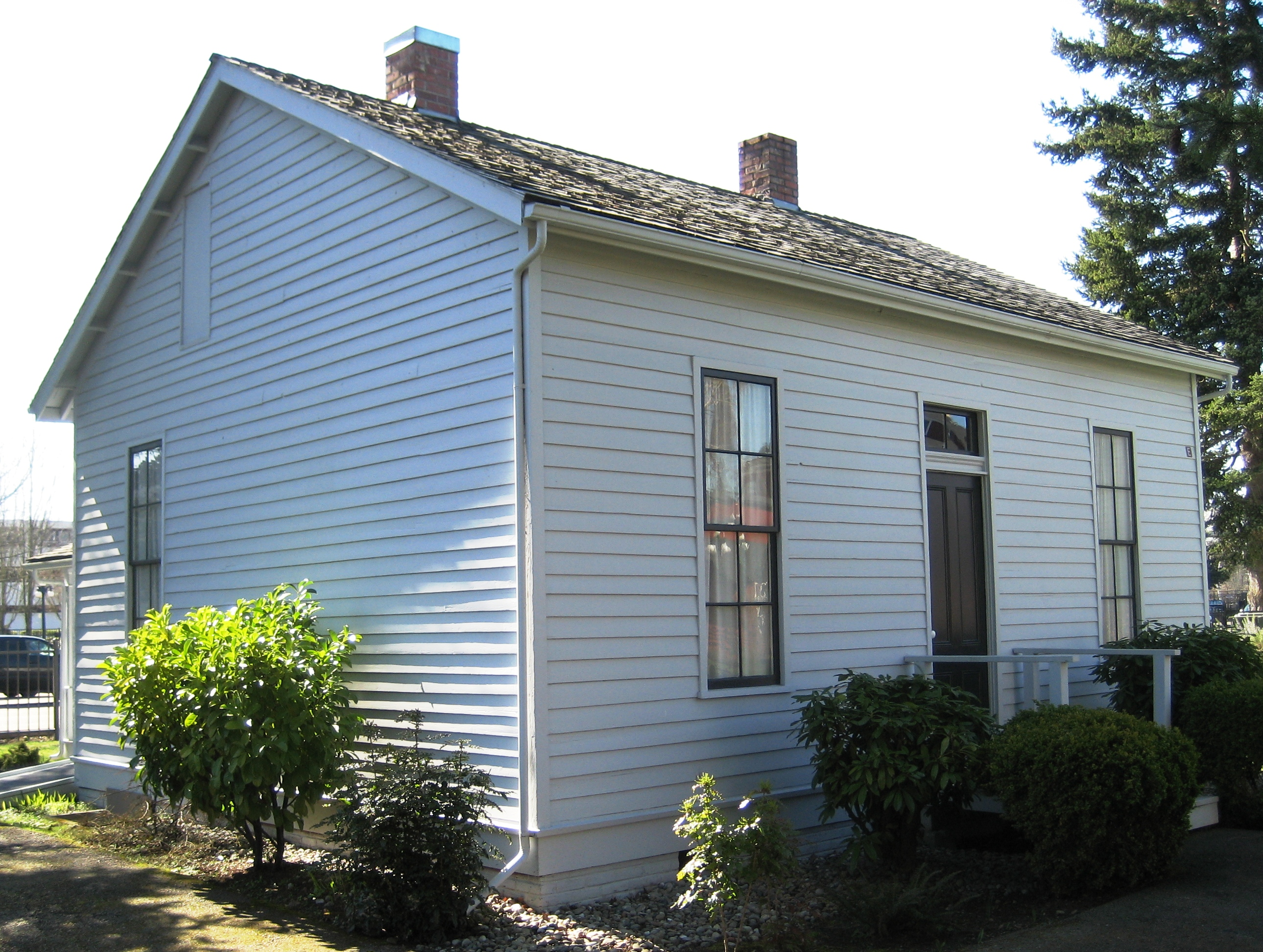
John D. Boon House

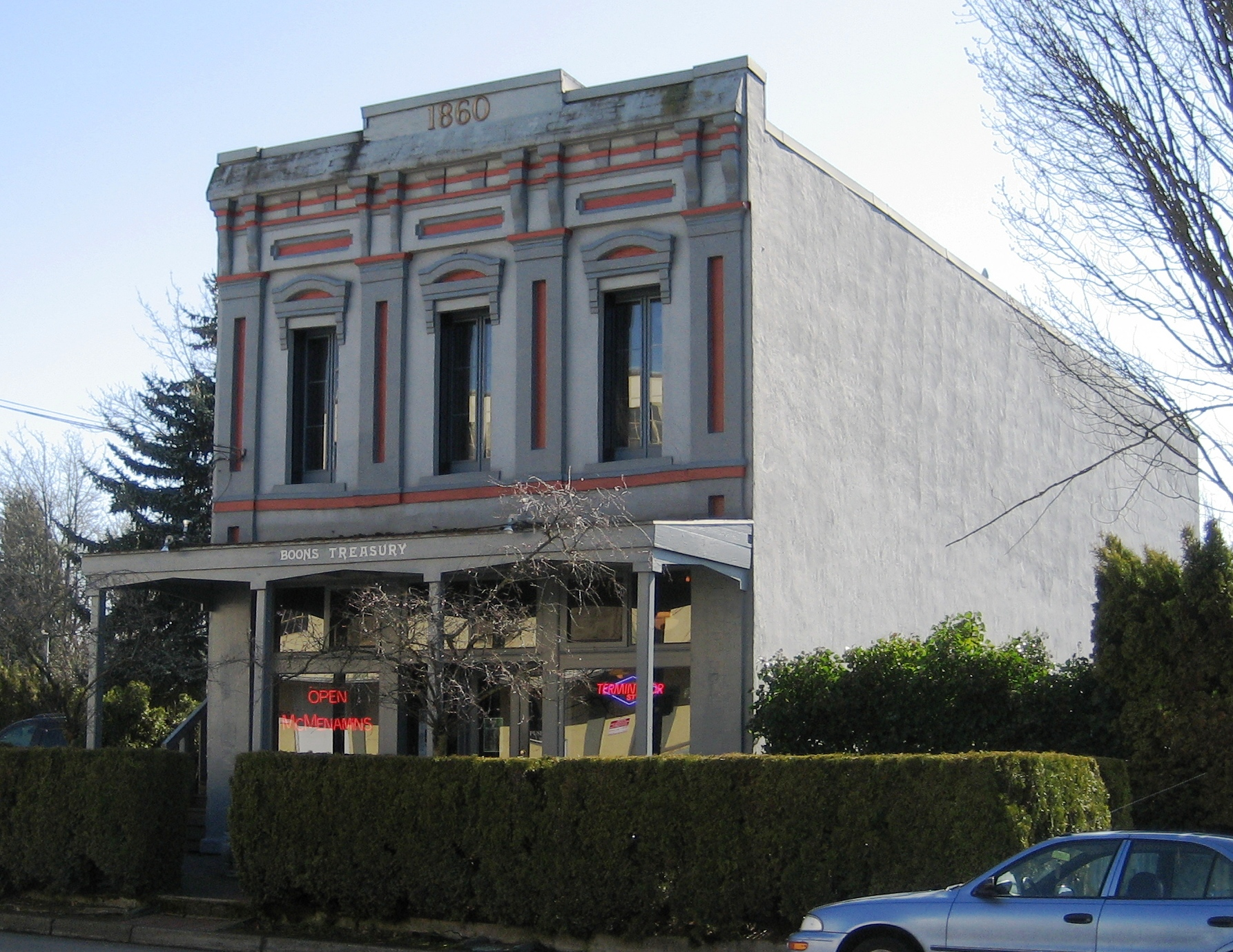
Boon Brick Store operated as "Boon's Treasury"

Boon was involved in various industries while also serving as treasurer, including transportation and telegraph companies. He helped organize the Woolen Mill Company in Salem in 1856, serving as treasurer of the company. Others in the founding group included George Henry Williams, La Fayette Grover, and Joseph G. Wilson. In 1860, while still in office he built a new brick building for his store, the first brick building in that part of Salem. The building is now a McMenamins brewpub known as Boon's Treasury. Both his store and his former home, John D. Boon House, are listed on the National Register of Historic Places.

After leaving office he returned to his mercantile business full-time. His son John L. Boone fought in the American Civil War and in 1884 was elected state senator in California as a Republican. John D. Boon died in Salem on July 17, 1864, at the age of 47 and was buried at Salem Pioneer Cemetery. Following his death, his name was sometimes spelled Boone by his children.

Political offices
Preceded by new office	Treasurer of Oregon; 1859–1862	Succeeded by Edwin N. Cooke
