= Charles S. Moore =

American businessman and politician

Charles Sumner Moore
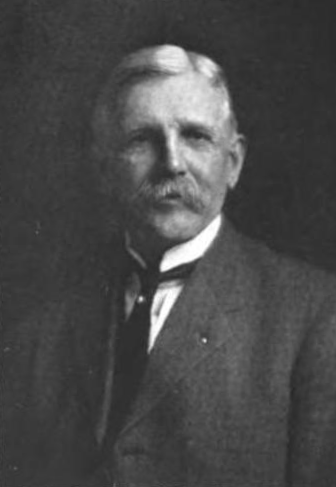

Oregon State Treasurer
- In office January 9, 1899 – January 14, 1907
- Governor: T. T. Geer; George Earle Chamberlain
- Preceded by: Phil Metschan
- Succeeded by: George A. Steel

Judge of Klamath County
- In office 1894–1898

Personal details
- Born: January 8, 1857 Marion County, Oregon
- Died: July 20, 1915 (aged 58) Portland, Oregon
- Party: Republican
- Spouse: Mary Langell
- Children: 2
- Education: Willamette University
- Occupation: Businessman

Charles Sumner Moore (January 8, 1857 – July 20, 1915) was an American businessman and politician from the state of Oregon. A native of the Pacific Northwest, he held several elected offices in Klamath County, including serving as county judge. A member of the Republican Party, Moore served as Oregon State Treasurer from 1899 to 1907.

== Early life ==
Charles Moore was born in the Willamette Valley, in Marion County, Oregon, on January 8, 1857, to William S. Moore and Margaret Octavia Moore (née Meldrum). He received his primary education at public schools in Oregon City and Salem before attending Willamette University in Salem from 1872 to 1874.

In 1874, Moore began working at the Klamath Indian Reservation in Southern Oregon, where he remained until 1877. That same year, he assisted his father in Klamath Falls with the construction of the community's first sawmill. After briefly studying law in Portland, he returned to Southern Oregon.

In 1878, Moore entered the retail industry as a store clerk, a position he held until 1886. He married Mary L. Langell of Jacksonville, Oregon, in 1884, and the couple had two sons. From 1886 to 1899, Moore managed and co-owned a mercantile business. During the 1890s, he and his brother Rufus helped establish the first electricity plant in Klamath Falls.

== Political career ==
In 1880, Charles Moore earned his first elected office as a school clerk for the Linkville School District, now known as Klamath Falls. He later served as a school director and won a seat on the first board of trustees for the town of Klamath Falls. From 1894 to 1898, Moore served as county judge of Klamath County. Notably, his father had served as the first county judge when Klamath County was established in 1882.

Moore was a delegate to the Republican National Convention in 1896. In 1898, he was elected as Oregon State Treasurer. Running as a Republican, he succeeded fellow Republican Phil Metschan, who had served two terms. Moore was re-elected in 1902, serving as state treasurer from January 9, 1899, until January 14, 1907, when George A. Steel assumed office.

Politically, Moore opposed the initiative and referendum system but supported the gold standard.

== Later years ==
After leaving office, Charles Moore returned to his business endeavors, which included involvement in the timber and banking industries. He also served on the board of directors for the Oregon Life Insurance Company.

Together with his brother Rufus, Moore was a prominent landowner in Klamath County.

Charles Moore died in Portland, Oregon on July 20, 1915, at the age of 58.

Political offices
Preceded by Phil Metschan	Treasurer of Oregon; 1899–1907	Succeeded by George A. Steel
