= Ray Murnane =

Australian rules footballer

Personal information
- Full name: Ramon Frederick Murnane
- Born: 6 September 1937; Colac, Victoria
- Died: 25 February 2013 (aged 75)
- Original team: Thornbury
- Height: 180 cm (5 ft 11 in)
- Weight: 90 kg (198 lb)

Playing career^{1}
Years	Club	Games (Goals)
1959–60	Collingwood	6 (0)
1961–68	Preston (VFA)	95 (114)
- ^{1} Playing statistics correct to the end of 1968.

Career highlights
- 1963 VFA Premiership; 1965 VFA Premiership

Ramon Frederick Murnane (6 September 1937 – 25 February 2013) was an Australian rules footballer who played with Collingwood in the Victorian Football League (VFL).
