= John Murnane =

Australian rules footballer

Personal information
- Full name: John Murnane
- Born: 11 February 1948 (age 78)
- Original team: St Kilda CBC
- Height: 180 cm (5 ft 11 in)
- Weight: 74.5 kg (164 lb)

Playing career^{1}
| Years | Club | Games (Goals) |
| 1966–67 | Melbourne | 7 (0) |
- ^{1} Playing statistics correct to the end of 1967.

John Murnane (born 11 February 1948) is a former Australian rules footballer who played with Melbourne in the Victorian Football League (VFL).

Following the end of his VFL career, Murnane played for Victorian Football Association (VFA) club Oakleigh, playing in their 1972 First Division premiership team and kicked 51 goals in the 1974 season.

== Sources ==
- Fiddian, M. (2016) The VFA, Melbourne Sports Books: Melbourne.
