= Monnet, Murnane & Co. =

Monnet, Murnane & Co. was an international investment banking firm founded in 1935 by George Murnane and Jean Monnet. The firm was initially bankrolled by John Foster Dulles, then a prominent Wall Street lawyer with the New York-based law firm Sullivan & Cromwell, whom Monnet had especially close ties to. Dulles, together with William Nelson Cromwell, each contributed $25,000 in the investment banking partnership. Dulles had first met Monnet at the Versailles Peace Conference. Murnane was a legend in the investment banking business, formerly a partner in Lee, Higginson & Co., which collapsed in the Swedish match scandal. Murnane became acquainted with Monnet while at Lee Higginson through Lee Higginson's role with the Kreuger match empire where Monnet was appointed liquidator of the empire on behalf of foreign investors.

Monnet & Murnane initially worked on the international financing of the China Development Finance Corporation, which Monnet had helped Chinese financier and statesman T. V. Soong to create in early 1934. It then thrived in the late thirties, thanks to both partners' international connections. Murnane went on to become a partner in Lazard Frères & Co., and Monnet was to be a principal architect of the European Economic Community. Murnane was connected to the Wallenberg family in Sweden, the Bosch family in Germany, the Solvays and Boëls in Belgium, and John Foster Dulles, André Meyer, and the Rockefeller family in the United States. He was considered among the most connected persons of his time.
