= Thomas B. Kay =

American politician (1864–1931)

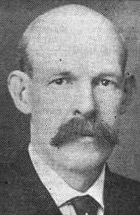
- Kay circa 1903

Oregon State Treasurer
- In office January 4, 1911– January 6, 1919; January 4, 1925– April 29, 1931
- Governor: Jay Bowerman; Oswald West; James Withycombe; Walter M. Pierce; I. L. Patterson; Julius L. Meier
- Preceded by: George A. Steel; Jefferson Myers
- Succeeded by: O. P. Hoff; Rufus C. Holman

Oregon State Senator
- In office 1907 – 1911
- Constituency: Marion County

Member of the Oregon House of Representatives
- In office 1903 – 1907; 1921 – 1925
- Constituency: Marion County

Personal details
- Born: February 28, 1864 Trenton, New Jersey
- Died: April 29, 1931 (aged 67) Salem, Oregon
- Party: Republican
- Spouse: Cora M. Wallace
- Children: 3
- Parents: Thomas Lister Kay; Ann Kay
- Education: Baptist College
- Occupation: Businessman

Thomas Benjamin Kay (February 28, 1864 – April 29, 1931) was an American politician and businessman in the state of Oregon. A native of New Jersey, he moved to Oregon with his family at the age of one where he later took over the family's mill business, the Thomas Kay Woolen Mill. A Republican, he served in both houses of the Oregon Legislative Assembly and four terms as the Oregon State Treasurer, the longest of anyone in that office's history.

== Early years ==
Thomas Kay was born on February 28, 1864, in Trenton, New Jersey, to Thomas Lister Kay and Ann (née Slingsbey) Kay. His father had already moved to Oregon before the younger Thomas was born. After the younger Thomas was born, his mother and the rest of the family immigrated to Oregon via the Isthmus of Panama route, arriving in 1864. The whole family settled in Brownsville where the elder Thomas was a partner in a woolen mill.

The younger Thomas Kay grew up in Brownsville and attended the local schools. When he was nine years old he started working at his father's mill as a spooler, and remained until age 14. Kay then moved to McMinnville and spent three years studying at the Baptist College (now Linfield College). He then left college in 1883 and returned to working for the mill, but at the mill's Portland store.

Kay returned to McMinnville in 1884 where started working in the apparel business, forming the partnership of Bishop & Kay with his brother-in-law C. P. Bishop. Bishop left the partnership after four years and the company became Kay & Todd. Kay was married in McMinnville on January 15, 1888, to Cora M. Wallace, and they had three children. In 1895, he started working for his father's new woolen mill in Salem as a salesperson. He also served for four years in the state militia.

In 1897, Kay traveled to New York City for the mill, and returned the next year. That year he sold his stake in the clothing company and moved to Salem where he took the position of assistant manager at the mill along with his sales position. In 1900, his father died, and Kay became the president of the Thomas Kay Woolen Mill, a position he would hold until his own death.

== Political career ==
Kay started his political career in local politics in McMinnville where he served on the city council and school board. In 1902, he was elected to the Oregon House of Representatives as a Republican to a two-year term. He represented district 1 that included Marion County, and was the chairman of the ways and means committee. Kay was re-elected to a second term in the house in 1904 and served through the 1905 legislative session. During the 1905 session he lost out on being Speaker of the House by a single vote to A. L. Mills. In 1906, Kay was elected to a four-year term in the Oregon State Senate. He again represented district 1 as a Republican, and served through the 1909 special session of the Oregon Legislative Assembly.

Kay did not run for re-election to the Senate in 1910, and instead was the Republican nominee for Oregon State Treasurer. He won the November election for a four-year term and took office on January 4, 1911. After re-election in 1914, he served a second full-term, leaving office on January 6, 1919. He was at times mentioned as a candidate for governor as well as the United States Senate.

He returned to state politics in 1920 and was elected back to the Oregon House, again representing district 1. Kay served his full two-year term, won re-election in 1922, and served through the 1923 legislative session. In 1924, he was again elected as state treasurer and took office on January 4, 1925. Kay won re-election to a fourth term in the office in 1928 and served until his death in office in 1931. His 14 years in the office are the longest of any treasurer in Oregon history.

== Later years ==
Kay was a member of several fraternal societies including the Masons as a member of the Knights Templar, the Benevolent and Protective Order of Elks, Salem Commercial Club, and the Woodmen of the World. Additionally, he was on the board of directors of the YMCA, the Illihee Club, the Portland Manufacturers' Association, and at Willamette University in Salem. He also served as director of Oregon's chamber of commerce and president of the state's board of trade. Thomas Benjamin Kay died on April 29, 1931, at the age of 67.

Political offices
Preceded by George A. Steel	Treasurer of Oregon; 1911–1919	Succeeded by O. P. Hoff
Preceded by Jefferson Myers	Treasurer of Oregon; 1925–1931	Succeeded by Rufus C. Holman
