= Thomas Lister Kay =

English-American businessman (died 1900)

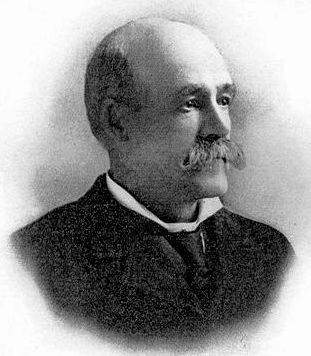
- Born: 1837 or 1838 (Note: The Oregon Encyclopedia gives Kay's date of birth as June 24, 1838. Other sources give Kay's year of birth as 1837.); Yorkshire, England
- Died: April 27, 1900; Portland, Oregon, U.S.
- Known for: Founding the Thomas Kay Woolen Mill
- Children: 10, including Thomas B. Kay
- Relatives: C. P. Bishop (son-in-law)

Thomas Lister Kay (born 1837 or 1838; died 1900) was an English-born textile worker and businessman who founded the Thomas Kay Woolen Mill in Salem, Oregon.

== Biography ==
Thomas Lister Kay was born in Yorkshire, England, in 1837 or 1838. Kay immigrated to the United States in 1857, working in several textile mills on the East Coast before moving to Oregon in 1863 to begin a job as a loom boss at a mill in Brownsville.

After the Brownsville mill burned in 1865, Kay found work at a variety of different mills in Oregon, but returned to Brownsville after the mill was rebuilt in 1875. He continued working there until the mill was dissolved in 1888.

Kay left the Brownsville mill as a co-owner, with a personal fortune of $55,000. Kay was interested in starting his own company and began exploring the possibility of opening a mill in Salem, Oregon. After securing $20,000 in backing from the citizens of Salem, the Thomas Kay Woolen Mill Company was incorporated in 1889.

Kay died at St. Vincent Hospital in Portland, Oregon, on April 27, 1900. According to The National Cyclopaedia of American Biography: "At the time of his death Kay was recognized as the foremost woolen manufacturer in the Pacific Northwest."

== Personal life ==
Kay married Ann Slingsby in 1857, shortly before he left for the United States. The couple had ten children, five of whom died before their parents. The couple's surviving children included Thomas B. Kay, who took over the family business after his father's death; and Martha Ann "Fannie" Kay, who would go on to found Pendleton Woolen Mills with her husband, C. P. Bishop, and three sons.
