= Willamette Heritage Center =

Museum in Salem, Oregon, U.S.

- Thomas Kay Woolen Mill
- U.S. National Register of Historic Places
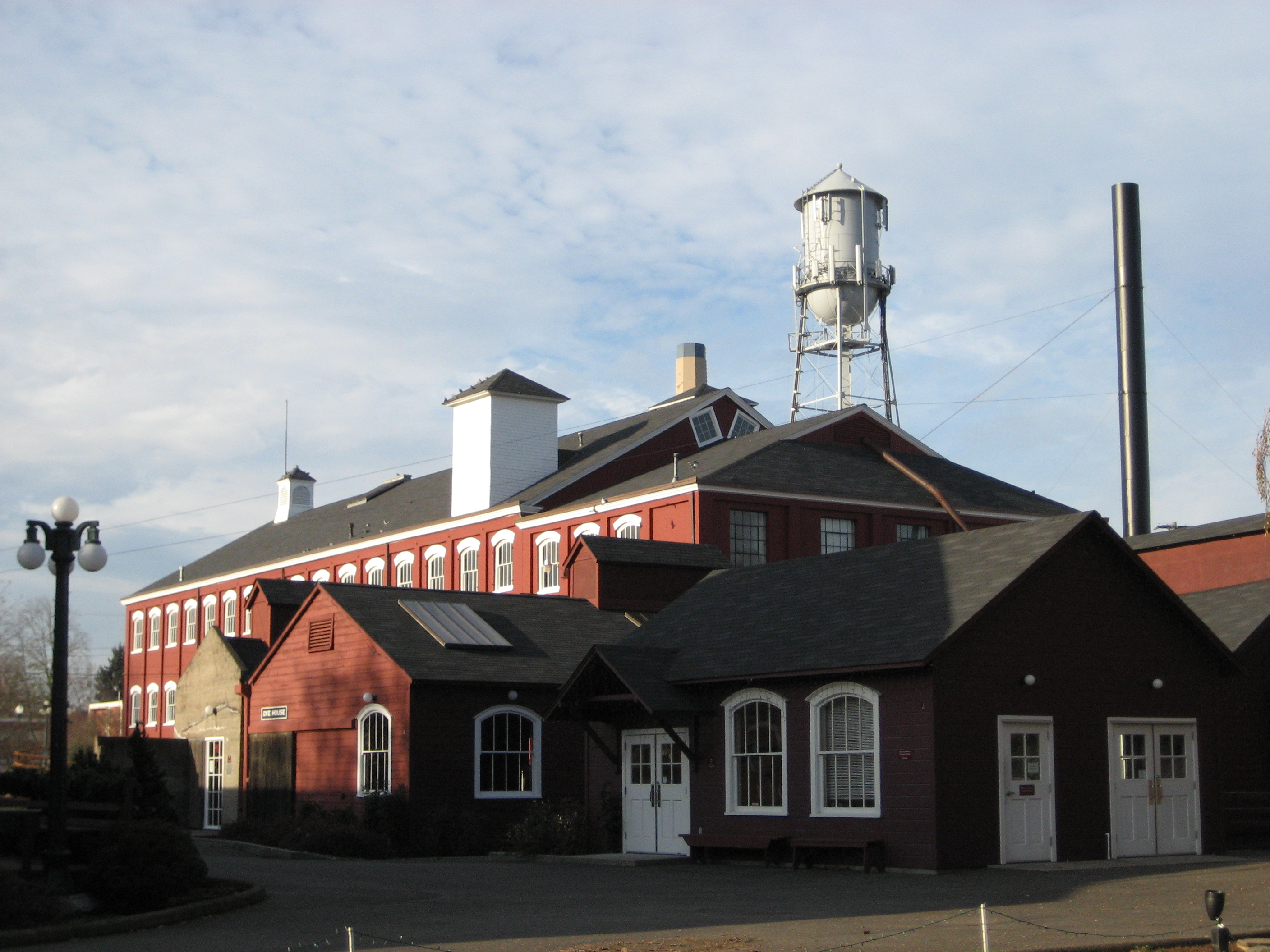
- Thomas Kay Woolen Mill from the rear, showing the dye house

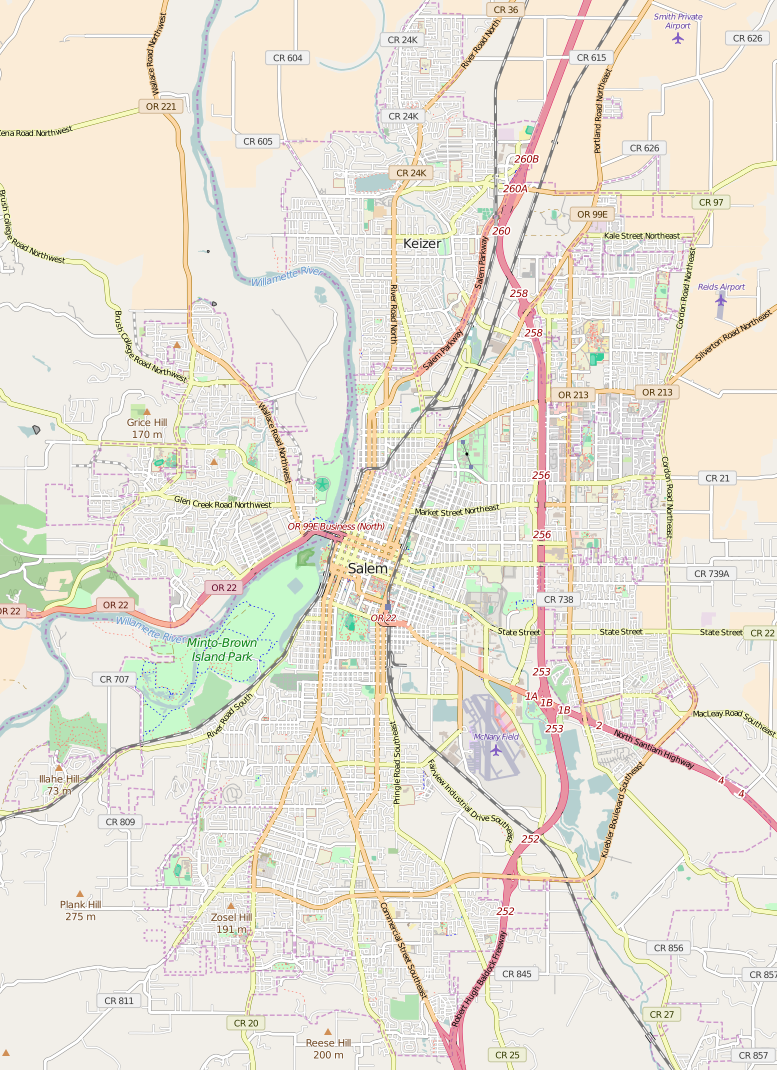
- Location within Salem OR Location within Oregon
- Location: Salem, Oregon, U.S.
- Coordinates: 44°56′6″N 123°1′37″W
- Built: 1889; 137 years ago
- Architect: Walter D. Pugh
- Website: willametteheritage.org
- NRHP reference No.: 73001579
- Added to NRHP: May 8, 1973

Willamette Heritage Center is a museum in Salem, Oregon, United States. The five-acre site features several structures listed on the National Register of Historic Places, including the Thomas Kay Woolen Mill, the Jason Lee House, Methodist Parsonage, John D. Boon House, and the Pleasant Grove (Condit) Church. The houses and church were relocated to the mill site. The Center also includes a research library and archives of Marion County history. Today, the Willamette Heritage Center offers self-guided tours, event rental spaces, educational classes, and also hosts local events for the community.

The Center was created in 2010 from the merger of the Mission Mill Museum Association (est. 1964) and the adjacent Marion County Historical Society (est. 1950).

== History ==
The Thomas Kay Woolen Mill was started in 1889 by Thomas Lister Kay, whose descendants eventually founded Pendleton Woolen Mills. The workforce of 50 labored 60-hour weeks. In 1895, a fire destroyed the mill. Ground was broken on a new mill structure on December 20, 1895, in the same location. This building, designed by architect W.D. Pugh, is the brick structure that stands today. The building opened to the public on May 15, 1896, to speeches, demonstrations and music.

The mill was operated by four generations of Kay family members. Thomas Lister Kay died in 1900 and his son Thomas B. Kay took over as president, serving until his own death in 1931. Thomas B. Kay's son Ercel took over for his father, and Ercel's son Tom Kay took over for him.

The mill announced its closure in 1959, and all operations ceased by 1962.

Archeological digs on the northern part of the center's grounds led to the discovery of the site where a Methodist mission school stood before it was destroyed by a fire in 1872.

== Museum ==
Visitors can tour the mill buildings with displays of original 19th and 20th century machinery and photos about industrial wool processing.

The houses and church have been restored and furnished to a mid 19th-century appearance. The Jason Lee House features a special exhibit about early Oregon during the time of the Methodist Mission.

The museum includes a water power interpretive exhibit by Portland General Electric. The exhibit demonstrates how the mill was run using the water from Mill Creek.

== Structures ==
- Jason Lee House (1841), a home of Jason Lee which, with the Parsonage, are the earliest known frame buildings in Salem, and perhaps the oldest remaining in the state
- Methodist Mission Parsonage (1841)
- John D. Boon House (1847)
- Pleasant Grove Presbyterian Church (1858)
- Thomas Kay Woolen Mill (1889/1896)

== See also ==
- National Register of Historic Places listings in Marion County, Oregon
- Oregon Historical Society
- Oregon Historical Society Museum
- State Library of Oregon
