= Francis J. Murnane =

American longshore worker

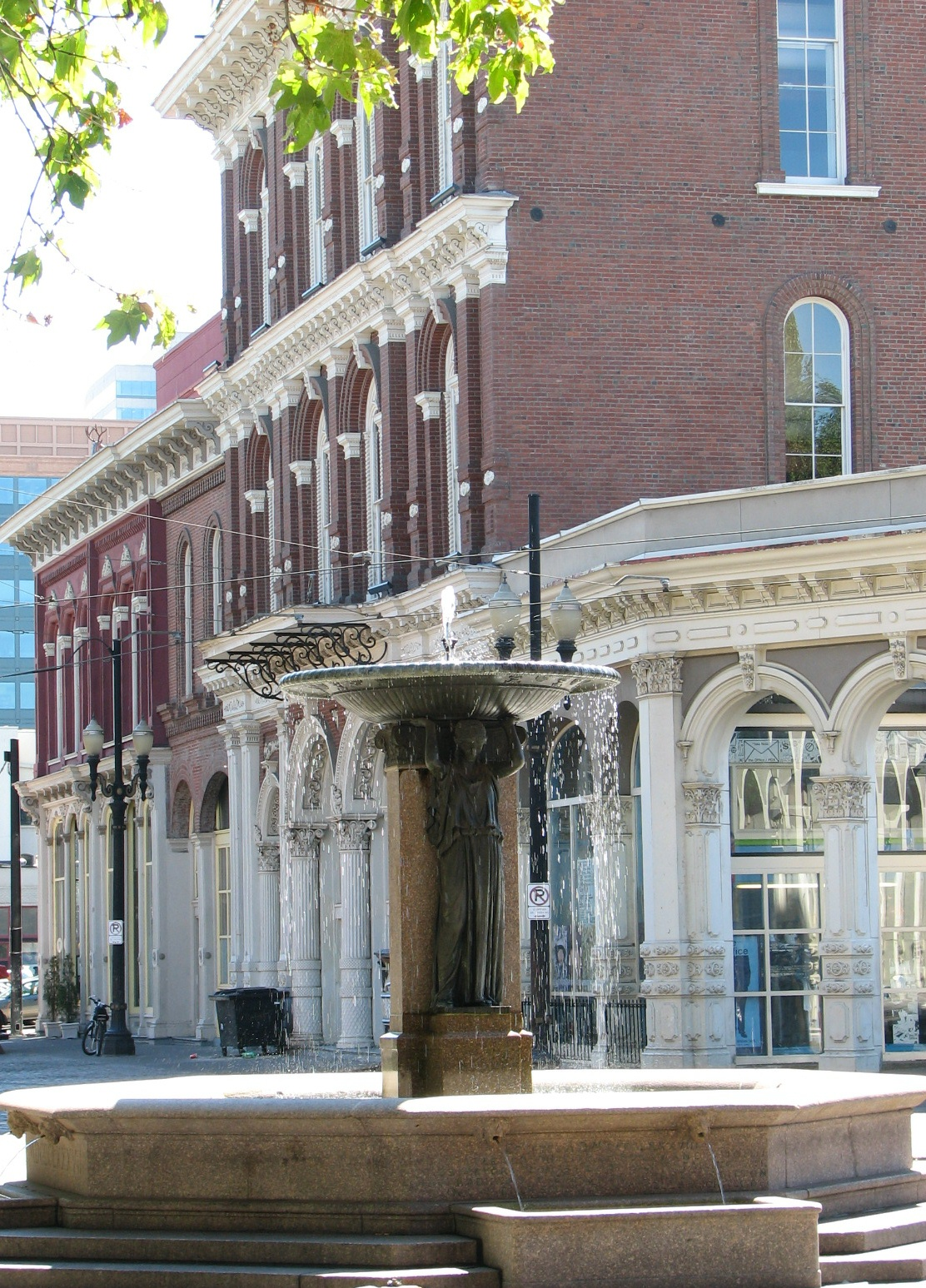
Portland's Skidmore Fountain was one of several historical monuments preserved at the urging of longshoreman Francis J. Murnane

Francis J. Murnane (1914–1968) was a longshore worker from Portland, Oregon, United States who was called "the cultural and historical conscience of Portland" after playing a key or solitary role in preserving several historical monuments in the city. He was the president of his union, International Longshore and Warehouse Union (ILWU) Local 8, and died of a heart attack while presiding over a meeting. A memorial wharf dedicated to Murnane, located on the Willamette River at Tom McCall Waterfront Park, is slated for demolition in 2009. An effort to restore the Murnane memorial is underway.

== Early years ==
Born in Boston, Massachusetts, Murnane moved to Portland at an early age and attended St. Lawrence Academy, Lincoln High School, and Columbia University, which is now known as the University of Portland. The Oregonian reported that, "His father sharpened axes in the lumber camps, and young Francis would listen to loggers' stories. He was moved by their stories 'of a world in which no hunger or want would be found among millions of working people.'" A lifelong Catholic, Murnane had considered entering the priesthood and the legal profession before starting work in a plywood mill.

== Union activism ==
At age 21, Murnane joined the Plywood & Veneer Workers Union and soon was elected president. Following the 1937 Plylock Plant lockout, which lasted two years and eight months, Murnane worked with Portland attorney Ben Anderson to file a suit on behalf of the locked-out workers. The suit, which has been written up in legal journals at Harvard and Yale, resulted in $1 million in payments to workers throughout Oregon. During WWII, after losing appeals for conscientious objector status, Murnane served four years in an Army engineer battalion. He then lived for a short time in San Francisco before returning to work as a longshore worker on the Portland waterfront in 1946. In the 1950s and 1960s, Murnane was elected to several terms as the ILWU Local 8 president, and was a prime mover in starting the union's annual Bloody Thursday commemoration of the ILWU's deadly 1934 strike. Though Murnane served on the Port Commission, he resigned his seat in 1966 to work on the first U.S. Senate campaign of then-Governor Mark Hatfield.

== Friendship with Harry Bridges ==
ILWU International President Harry Bridges credited Murnane for helping Bridges fight his deportation. Bridges served as an honorary pallbearer at Murnane's funeral and said during his graveside eulogy at Mt. Calvary cemetery in Portland:

"This is a sad day for me, perhaps the saddest of my life. The words I am saying now I say with a heavy heart. ... Many times our paths have crossed in the 30 years I have known Francis. He was armed with a tremendous knowledge of working class labor history and working class struggle. Sometimes we differed, but this never altered my respect for his many enterprises. ... Francis was a dedicated, steadfast union man and a true comrade of arms, one to whom I am personally indebted to than any other man."

== Historic preservation ==
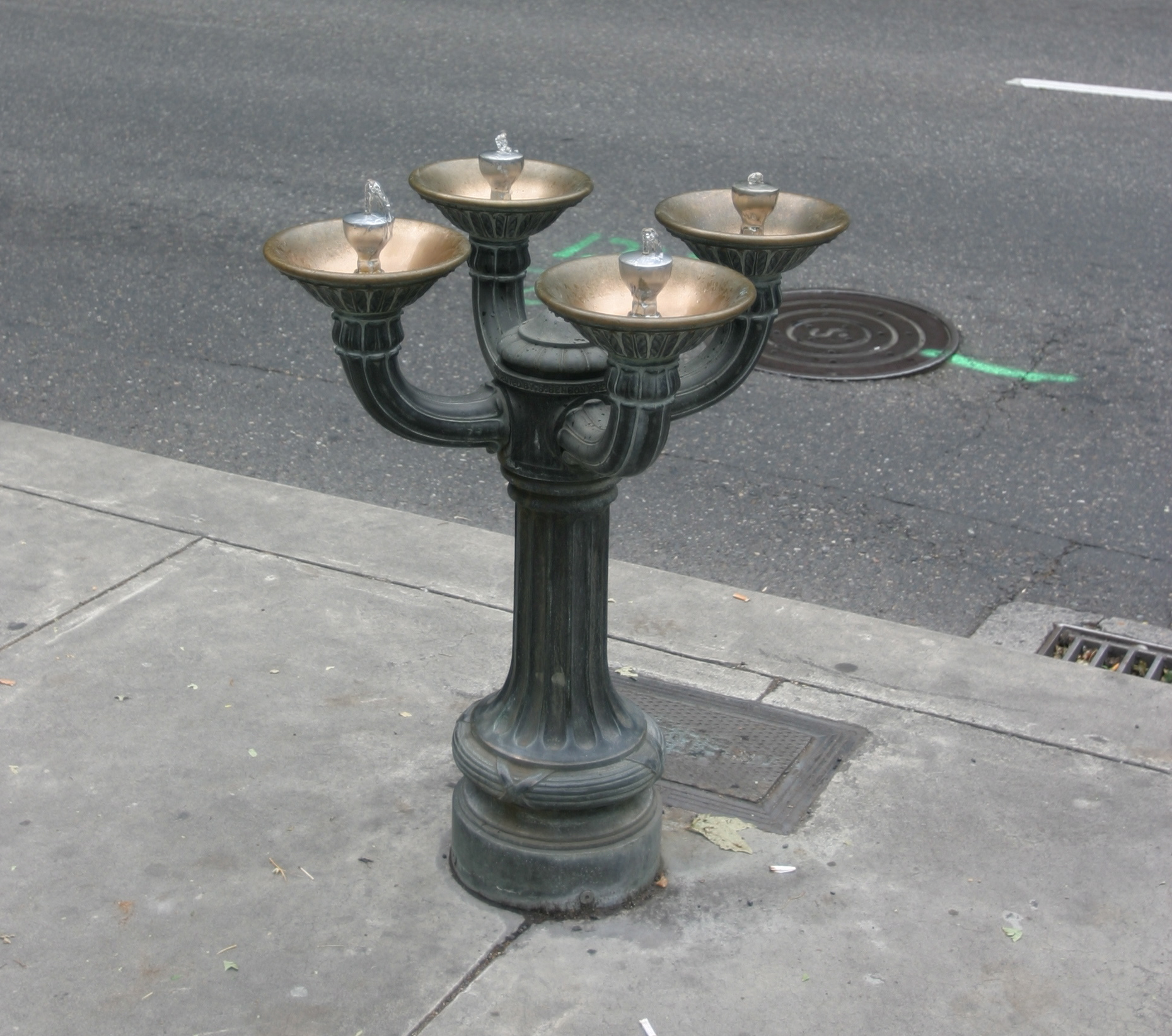
The city's signature "Benson Bubbler" fountains were Murnane's first successful preservation of historic resources

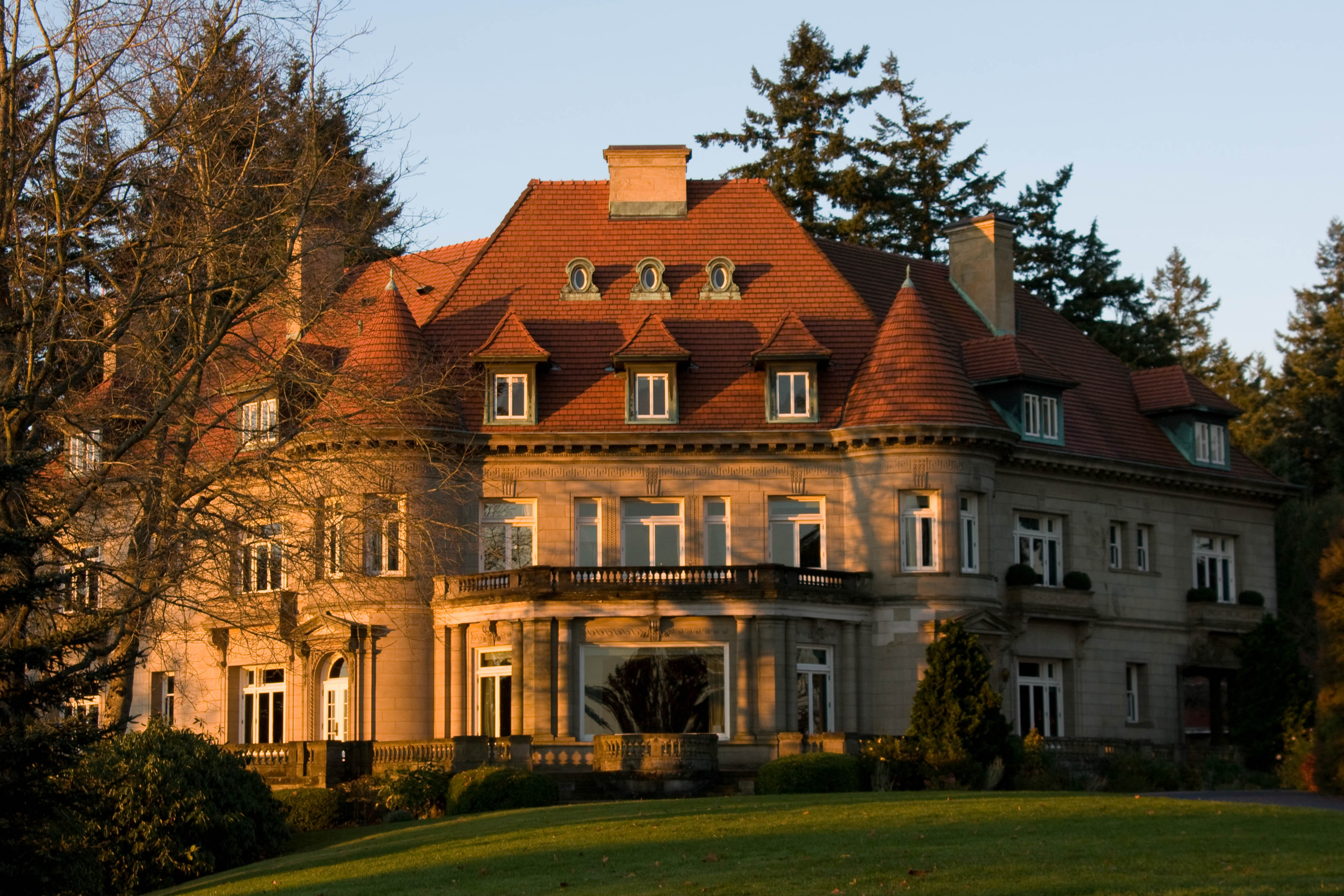
Murnane helped secure Portland's Pittock Mansion in a public trust. It remains open to the public.

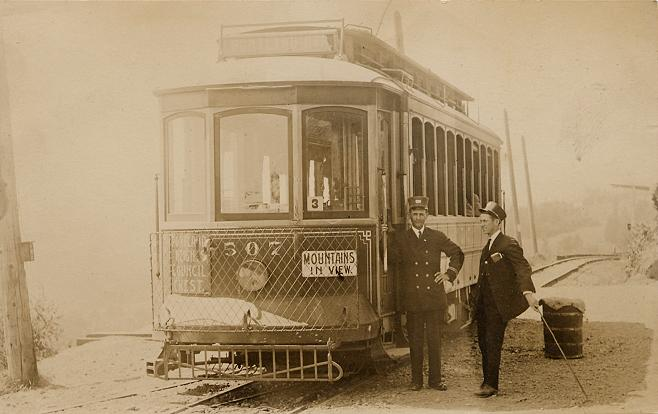
The Council Crest streetcar was preserved at Murnane's urging

In 1958, Murnane began a one-man campaign to preserve several historic monuments throughout Portland. That year, he urged the City Council to restore the brass drinking fountains known as Benson Bubblers, of which 20 had been installed across downtown in 1912 to provide drinking water to thirsty loggers.

After the victory on the Benson fountains, Murnane went on to play a solitary or key role in preserving historical monuments including:

- Skidmore Fountain, which was dilapidated and slated for removal
- Campbell Memorial, which stands at 18th and West Burnside in Portland and honors Oregon firefighters killed in the line of duty. Murnane testified at a City Council meeting that "Should placing new stones at the memorial be required, whatever the cost, civil decency and respect for those who gave their lives for their fellow citizens – are ample justification."
- Iron fences on Vista Avenue, which would have been replaced by concrete
- Pittock Mansion, a historic mansion which he helped place into a public trust
- Portland sternwheeler, preserved
- Council Crest streetcar, preserved
- Renovation of City Council chambers
- Removal of billboard that was blocking Pioneer Post Office

== Organizations ==
Murnane started or served in the following organizations:

- International Longshore and Warehouse Union, Local 8
- Portland Arts Commission
- Oregon Port Commission
- Multnomah County Planning Commission
- Portland Reporter newspaper
- Woodworkers Local 9-102
- Portland Industrial Union Council
- Oregon State CIO

== Death ==
Murnane died of a heart attack while presiding over a stop-work union meeting at ILWU Local 8. Harry Bridges eulogized at Murnane's graveside memorial on April 16, 1968, saying:

"[Last week I attended] another funeral in Atlanta for an honorary member of my union, Dr. Martin Luther King – an American dedicated to ending the great threat in our society today, racial discrimination. Murnane, too, died in action, after calling for an organizational order of business. I don’t think it’s any secret that at this last meeting Francis presided over, the issue of discrimination came on the floor. He used his eloquence toward eliminating injustices. We must this day and in his memory to strive to eliminate such injustice in our ranks. We must re-dedicate ourselves to see these ideals become reality."

More than 500 people attend Murnane's 1968 funeral, including ILWU International President Harry Bridges, who served as honorary pallbearer and delivered a graveside eulogy, Governor Tom McCall, U.S. Senator Wayne Morse Wayne Morse, Mayor Terry Schrunk, Dovie Odom Hatfield, mother of Mark Hatfield Commissioner William Bowes, Commissioner Frank Ivancie, and Commissioner Stanley Earl.

== Memorial wharf ==
In 1979, the Portland Development Commission (PDC) and the City of Portland, working with the members of the ILWU's Columbia River District Council, built and dedicated a wharf on the Willamette River as the "Frances J. Murnane Memorial Wharf". The wharf is located at the site of Portland's first commercial dock, which was known as Waymire Dock, where Southwest Ankeny Street meets Tom McCall Waterfront Park. ILWU International President Harry Bridges, along with about 100 longshore workers, joined elected officials and faith leaders at the dedication ceremony.

The plaque honoring Murnane at the wharf read:

"Here at the site of Portland's first commercial dock, the citizens of Portland, Oregon, have dedicated this area of the Waterfront Park in memory of Francis J. Murnane, many times President of Local 8, Longshoremen's & Warehousemen's Union (ILWU), in recognition of his years of service to the men along the shore, whose labor, sweat and skills have helped make our city one of the great ports of the world. His concern encompasses the city, its fountains, parks, statues and its history. He was known by the City fathers of his time as the "cultural and historical conscience of Portland."

The plaque has since disappeared, been replaced, and again removed, and the wharf has largely been forgotten as a memorial. It is often called the "Ankeny wharf" and is slated for demolition in 2009. An effort to restore a Murnane memorial is underway.

== Quotes about Murnane ==
"Murnane was a barn-burner, a table-pounder who choked the microphone with eloquence and got things done in caucuses and conventions, and at City Hall, because he could outshout the opposition." – ILWU Northwest Regional Director G. Johnny Parks

"Francis Murnane was a tremendous man whose concern for his community and fellow man far exceed his personal desires and needs. While his leadership will be missed by the ILWU cannot be replaced, his many contributions and able leadership in his community cannot be replaced. I have personally lost a wonderful friend." - U.S. Sen. Mark O. Hatfield, April 11, 1968
