= Oregon State Treasurer =

Executive officer in Oregon

- Great Seal of the State of Oregon

Details of Office
- Branch: Executive
- Type: Partisan
- Selection: Statewide election
- Term: 4 years, renewable once in a 12-year period
- Authority: Oregon Constitution, Art. 6 § 4
- Established: 1843 (provisional); 1859 (current)

Incumbent
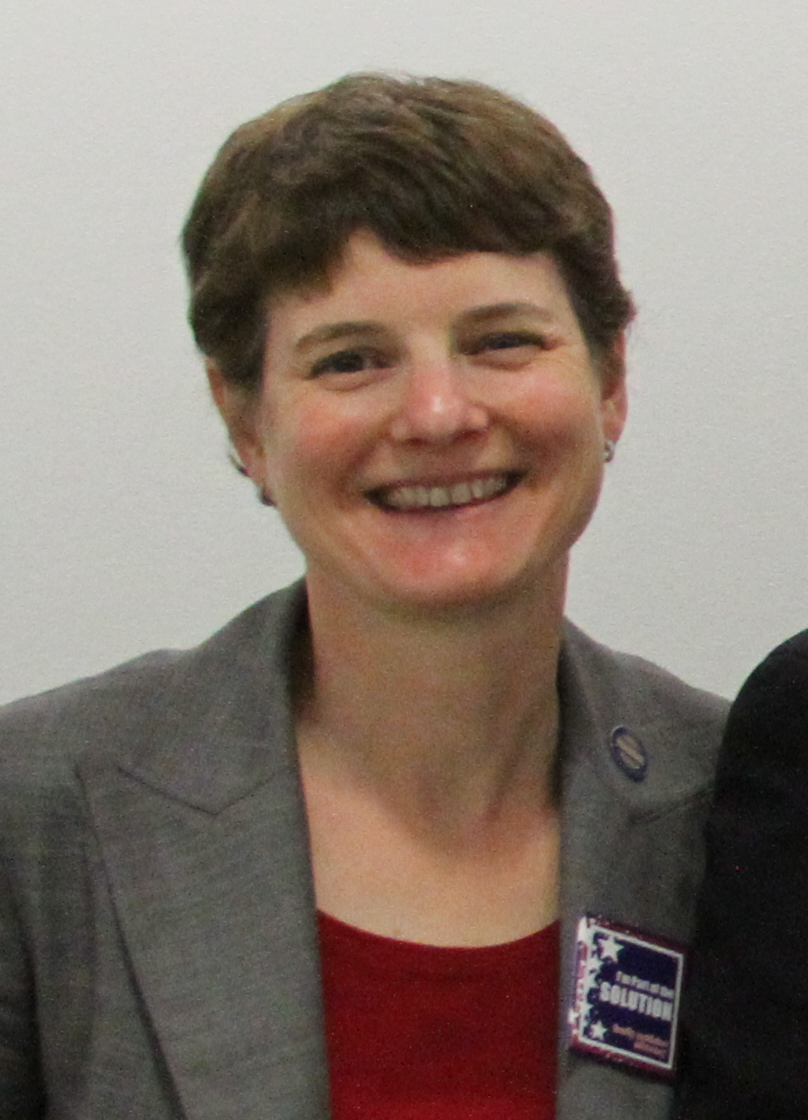
- Name: Elizabeth Steiner
- Party: Democratic
- Term start: January 6, 2025
- Term end: 2029

The Oregon state treasurer is a constitutional officer within the executive branch of the government of the U.S. state of Oregon, elected by statewide vote to serve a four-year term. As chief financial officer for the state, the office holder heads the Oregon State Treasury, and with the Governor and Secretary of State, serves on the Land Board.

The current state treasurer is Elizabeth Steiner, who was elected in 2024.

== Divisions ==
- Finance Division - acts as the central bank for all state agencies and is the largest financial institution in the state.
- Investment Division - manages the portfolio of investments for the state's funds.
- Debt Management Division - coordinates bonds issued by the state and its agencies, and monitors relevant markets and economic trends.
- Information Services Division - responsible for the Treasury's technological infrastructure.
- Executive Division - develops economic policy through strategic planning, legislative initiatives; performs the department's administrative functions, and publishes all Treasury reports.

== List of Oregon treasurers ==
=== Provisional treasurers ===
Those who served as the Treasurer of the Provisional Government of Oregon prior to the creation of the Oregon Territory.

Image	Name	Years	Notes
	William H. Gray	March 1, 1843 – July 5, 1843	Elected during the Champoeg Meetings
	William H. Willson	July 5, 1843 – May 14, 1844	Elected during the Champoeg Meetings
	Philip Foster	July 2, 1844 – July 7, 1845	Elected by the general public
	Francis Ermatinger	July 7, 1845 – March 3, 1846	Elected by the general public, elected by the Provisional Legislature, resigned
	John H. Couch	March 4, 1846 – September 27, 1847	Appointed, elected by the Provisional Legislature, resigned
	William K. Kilbourne	October 11, 1847 – September 28, 1849	Appointed, elected by the Provisional Legislature on February 13, 1849

=== Territorial treasurers ===
Those who served as the Treasurer of the Oregon Territory.

Image	Name	Years	Notes
	James Taylor	September 27, 1849 – January 21, 1851	Elected by the Oregon Territorial Legislature
	Levi A. Rice	January 21, 1851 – September 22, 1851	Elected by the Oregon Territorial Legislature, resigned
	William W. Buck	September 27, 1851 – December 16, 1851	Appointed
	John D. Boon	December 16, 1851 – January 24, 1855	Elected by the Oregon Territorial Legislature
	Nathaniel H. Lane	January 24, 1855 – January 10, 1856	Elected by the Oregon Territorial Legislature
	John D. Boon	January 10, 1856 – March 3, 1859	Elected by the Oregon Territorial Legislature

=== State treasurers ===
The individuals who have served as state treasurer since its admission to the Union are listed on the table below. Except where noted, treasurers were elected on a statewide ballot and served one or more full terms.

#	Image	Name	Party	Term
1		John D. Boon	Democratic	March 3, 1859 – September 8, 1862
2		Edwin N. Cooke	Republican	September 8, 1862 – September 12, 1870
3		Louis Fleischner	Democratic	September 12, 1870 – September 14, 1874
4		A. H. Brown	Democratic	September 14, 1874 – September 9, 1878
5		Edward Hirsch	Republican	September 9, 1878 – January 10, 1887
6		G. W. Webb	Democratic	January 10, 1887 – January 12, 1891
7		Phil Metschan	Republican	January 12, 1891 – January 9, 1899
8		Charles S. Moore	Republican	January 9, 1899 – January 14, 1907
9		George A. Steel	Republican	January 15, 1907 – January 3, 1911
10		Thomas B. Kay	Republican	January 4, 1911 – January 6, 1919
11		O. P. Hoff	Republican	January 6, 1919 – March 18, 1924
12		Jefferson Myers	Democratic	March 18, 1924 – January 4, 1925
13		Thomas B. Kay	Republican	January 4, 1925 – April 29, 1931
14		Rufus C. Holman	Republican	May 1, 1931 – December 27, 1938
15		Walter E. Pearson	Democratic	December 27, 1938 – January 6, 1941
16		Leslie M. Scott	Republican	January 6, 1941 – January 3, 1949
17		Walter J. Pearson	Democratic	January 3, 1949 – January 5, 1953
18		Sig Unander	Republican	January 5, 1953 – December 31, 1959
19		Howard C. Belton	Republican	January 4, 1960 – January 4, 1965
20		Robert W. Straub	Democratic	January 4, 1965 – January 1, 1973
21		James A. Redden	Democratic	January 1, 1973 – January 3, 1977
22		Clay Myers	Republican	January 3, 1977 – April 1, 1984
23		Bill Rutherford	Republican	April 1, 1984 – July 9, 1987
24		Tony Meeker	Republican	July 9, 1987 – January 4, 1993
25		Jim Hill	Democratic	January 4, 1993 – January 1, 2001
26		Randall Edwards	Democratic	January 1, 2001 – January 4, 2009
27		Ben Westlund	Democratic	January 5, 2009 – March 7, 2010
28		Ted Wheeler	Democratic	March 9, 2010 – January 1, 2017
29		Tobias Read	Democratic	January 3, 2017 – January 6, 2025
30		Elizabeth Steiner	Democratic	January 6, 2025 – present
