= 1960 United States Senate elections in Oregon =

- November 8, 1960
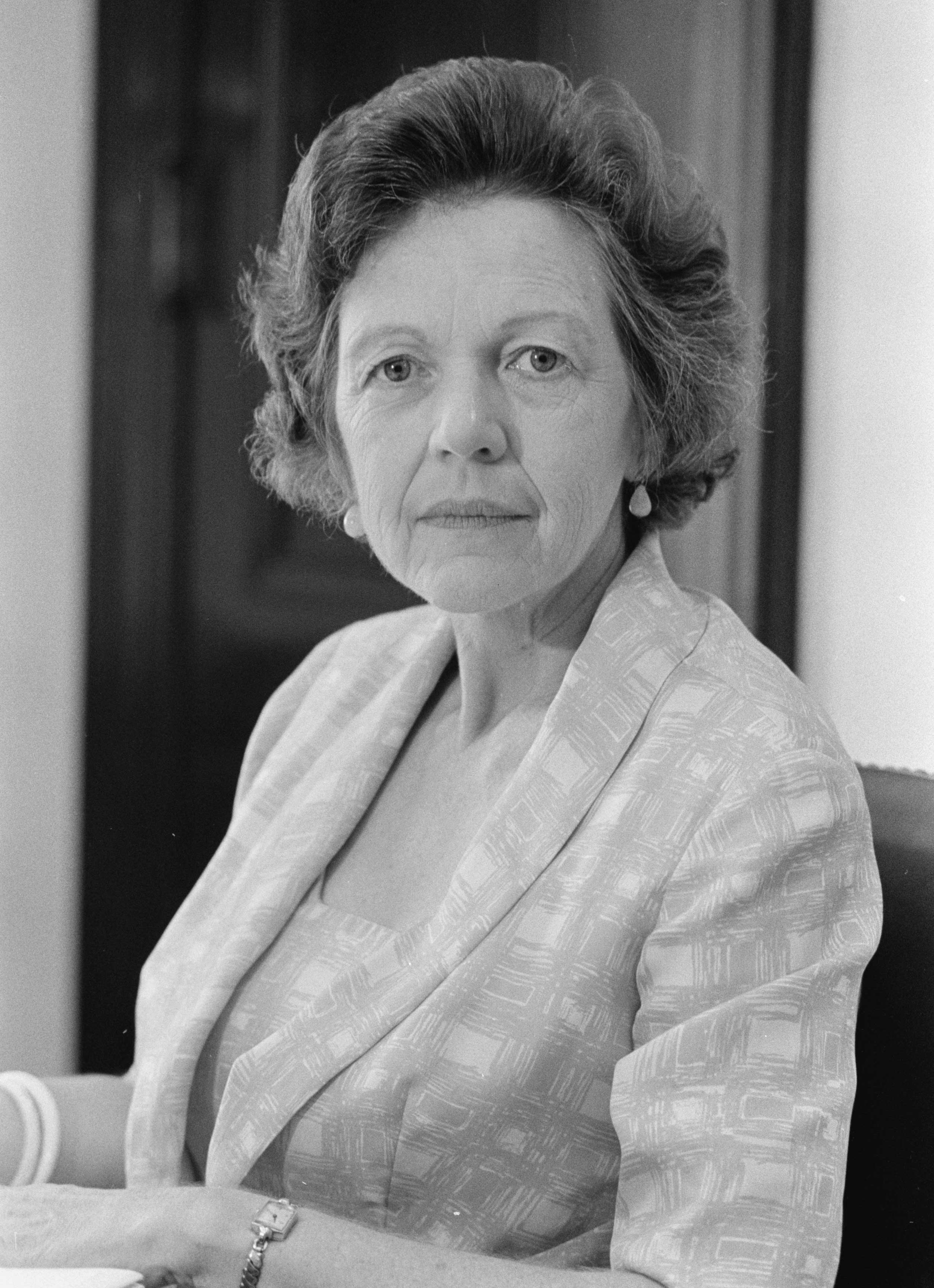

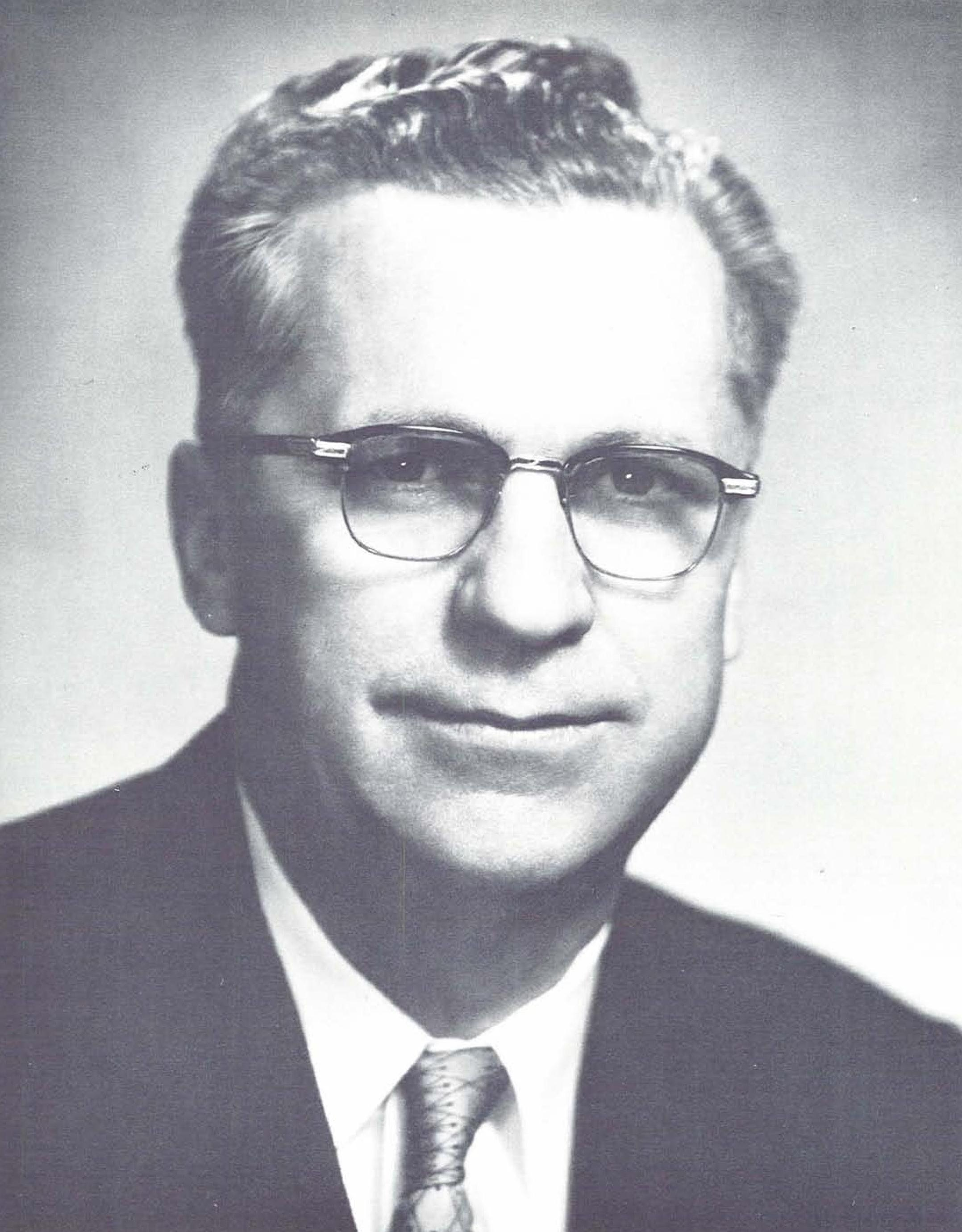
| Nominee | Maurine Neuberger | Elmo Smith |
| Party | Democratic | Republican |
| Regular election | 412,757; 54.61% | 343,009; 45.38% |
| Special election | 422,024; 54.98% | 345,464; 45.01% |
- Regular/special election county results (Note: While there were some slight differences in the particular percentages, the county results for the regular and special elections, both in their winners and percent ranges, were identical.); Neuberger: 50–60% 60–70% Smith: 50–60%
U.S. senator before election
Hall S. Lusk
Democratic
Elected U.S. Senator
Maurine Neuberger
Democratic

The 1960 United States Senate elections in Oregon took place on November 8, 1960.

First-term Democrat Richard L. Neuberger had been diagnosed with testicular cancer in 1958 that became terminal by 1960 — but was kept from the public. Neuberger remained at home in early 1960, reportedly battling the flu. Though still publicly seeking re-election, he told his campaign chair, attorney Jack Beatty, "Remember, there's always another Neuberger," referring to his wife. The comment, combined with Neuberger's reluctance to meet in public and weak voice on the phone, led Beatty to believe that Neuberger's condition was grave, a suspicion confirmed by the Senator's physician shortly before Neuberger died at Good Samaritan Hospital on March 9, 1960.

Justice of the Oregon Supreme Court Hall S. Lusk was appointed on March 16, 1960, by Republican governor Mark Hatfield to fill the vacancy until a special election could be held.

Hatfield stated that he intended to have appointed Neuberger, but that he wanted to appoint someone who would be focused on completing the remaining eight months of the term and not running in the regular-term Senate election as Neuberger had announced she would. Some observers noted that Hatfield, a Republican, though required by state law to appoint someone of the same political party as the late Senator Neuberger, did not want to give the other party the political advantage of incumbency.

Two elections for the Class 2 Senate seat were held on the same day; one as a special election to fill the remainder of Neuberger's original six-year term, and another to select a Senator to serve the next six-year term. Senator Lusk did not run for election.

Neuberger's widow Maurine Brown Neuberger was elected on November 8, 1960, both to finish the term and to the next term. Democrats would not win this seat again until 2008.

== Primary elections ==
Primary elections were held on May 20, 1960.

=== Democratic primary ===
==== Candidates ====
- Roscoe Imrie Conn
- Daniel N. Cox
- Harry C. Fowler, judge
- Fred O. Like
- William B. Murphy, radio station owner
- Maurine B. Neuberger, former State Representative, widow of former U.S. Senator Richard L. Neuberger

Maurine Neuberger was the only candidate for the special election to finish Richard Neuberger's term. Cox was ineligible for the nomination as he had not properly registered in time as a voter.

==== Results ====
===== Regular election =====
Democratic primary results
| Party | Candidate | Votes | % |
|---|---|---|---|
| Democratic | Maurine Neuberger | 211,961 | 77.88% |
| Democratic | Harry C. Fowler | 28,032 | 10.30% |
| Democratic | William B. Murphy | 16,245 | 5.97% |
| Democratic | Roscoe Imrie Conn | 7,164 | 2.63% |
| Democratic | Fred O. Like | 5,352 | 1.97% |
| Democratic | Daniel N. Cox | 3,142 | 1.15% |
| Write-in | | 283 | 0.10% |
| Total votes | | 272,179 | |

===== Special election =====
Democratic primary results
| Party | Candidate | Votes | % |
|---|---|---|---|
| Democratic | Maurine Neuberger | 244,865 | 99.49% |
| Write-in | | 1,249 | 0.51% |
| Total votes | | 246,114 | |

=== Republican primary ===
==== Candidates ====
- Elmo Smith, former Governor of Oregon
- (Herbert) George Altvater, public works inspector, unsuccessful candidate for Republican nomination for U.S. Senate in 1956
- R. F. Cook, turkey grower, unsuccessful candidate for Republican nomination for Oregon's 1st congressional district in 1956
- Thomas Killam, real estate dealer

Cook and Killam were not candidates for the special election to finish Neuberger's term.

==== Results ====
===== Regular election =====
Republican primary results
| Party | Candidate | Votes | % |
|---|---|---|---|
| Republican | Elmo Smith | 179,575 | 76.53% |
| Republican | George Altvater | 20,438 | 8.71% |
| Republican | R. F. Cook | 19,443 | 8.29% |
| Republican | Thomas Killam | 14,490 | 6.18% |
| Write-in | | 701 | 0.30% |
| Total votes | | 234,647 | |

===== Special election =====
Republican primary results
| Party | Candidate | Votes | % |
|---|---|---|---|
| Republican | Elmo Smith | 201,024 | 85.52% |
| Republican | George Altvater | 33,022 | 14.05% |
| Write-in | | 1,013 | 0.43% |
| Total votes | | 235,059 | |

== General election ==
=== Results ===
==== Regular election ====
1960 United States Senate election in Oregon
| Party | Candidate | Votes | % | ±% |
|---|---|---|---|---|
| Democratic | Maurine Neuberger | 412,757 | 54.61% | |
| Republican | Elmo Smith | 343,009 | 45.38% | |
| Write-in | | 109 | 0.01% | |
| Majority | | 69,748 | 9.23% | |
| Turnout | | 755,875 | | |
| Democratic hold | | | | |

==== Special election ====
1960 United States Senate special election in Oregon
| Party | Candidate | Votes | % | ±% |
|---|---|---|---|---|
| Democratic | Maurine Neuberger | 422,024 | 54.98% | |
| Republican | Elmo Smith | 345,464 | 45.01% | |
| Write-in | | 93 | 0.01% | |
| Majority | | 76,560 | 9.97% | |
| Turnout | | 767,581 | | |
| Democratic hold | | | | |

== See also ==
- 1960 United States Senate elections

== Bibliography ==
- Congressional Elections, 1946-1996. Washington, D.C.: Congressional Quarterly Inc. 1998. ISBN 1-56802-248-4.
- Appling, Jr., Howell. Official Abstract of Votes. Primary Nominating Election, May 20, 1960. State of Oregon.
- Appling, Jr., Howell. Official Abstract of Votes. General Election, November 8, 1960. State of Oregon.
