= Elmo Smith =

27th Governor of Oregon (1909–1968)

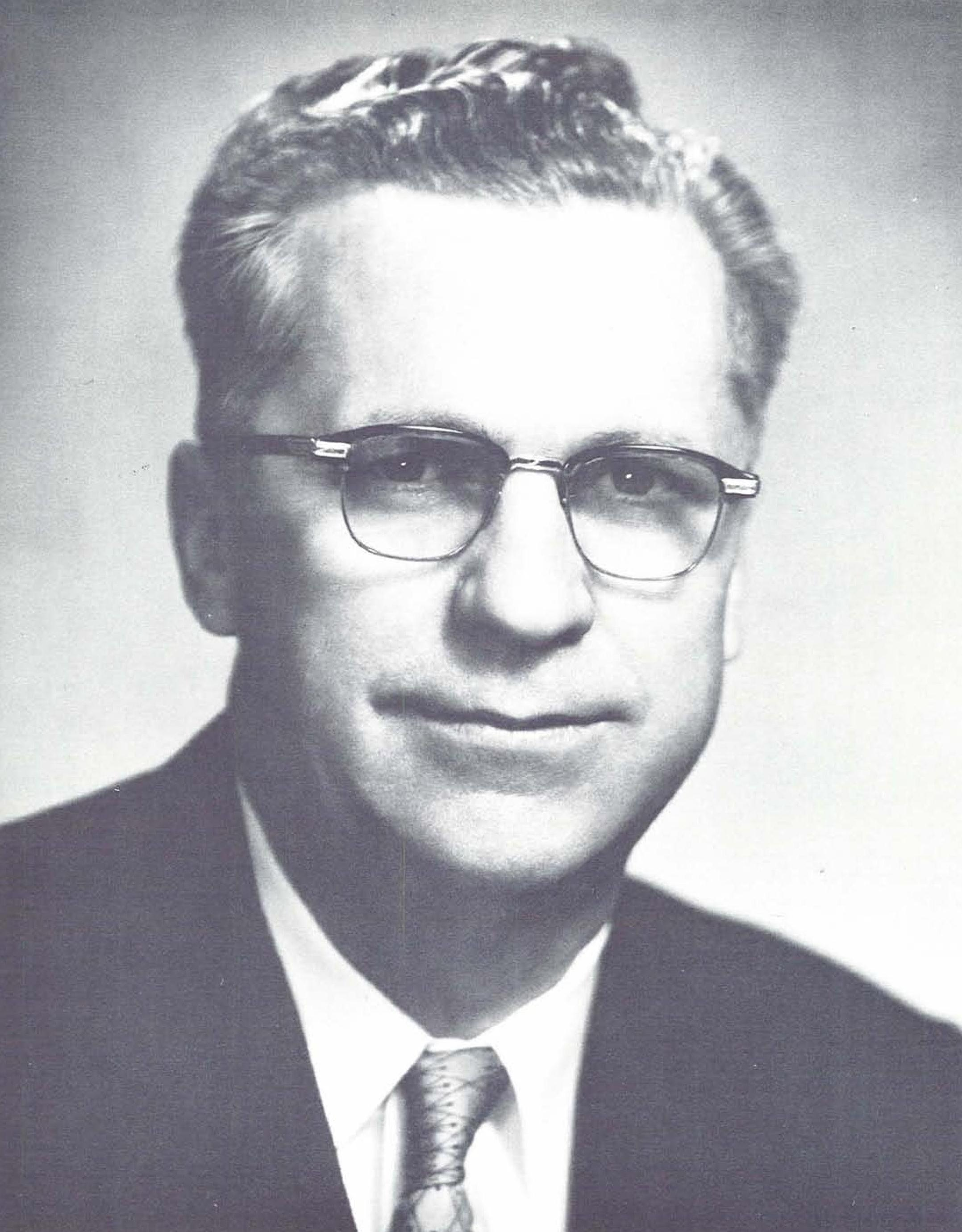

27th Governor of Oregon
- In office January 31, 1956 – January 14, 1957
- Preceded by: Paul L. Patterson
- Succeeded by: Robert D. Holmes

40th President of the Oregon State Senate
- In office 1955–1956
- Preceded by: Eugene E. Marsh
- Succeeded by: Boyd R. Overhulse

Member of the Oregon State Senate
- In office 1948–1956

Personal details
- Born: Elmo Everett Smith; November 19, 1909 Grand Junction, Colorado, U.S.
- Died: July 15, 1968 (aged 58) Albany, Oregon, U.S.
- Party: Republican
- Spouse: Dorothy Smith (m. 1933)
- Children: 2, including Dennis Alan Smith
- Education: College of Idaho (BA)

Military service
- Allegiance: United States
- Branch/service: United States Navy
- Years of service: 1943–1945
- Rank: Lieutenant
- Unit: Pacific Theater of Operations
- Battles/wars: World War II

Elmo Everett Smith (November 19, 1909 – July 15, 1968) was an American politician and newspaper publisher who served as the 27th governor of Oregon from 1956 to 1957. A member of the Republican Party, Smith served two terms as mayor of Ontario, Oregon, from 1940 to 1943 before resigning to enlist in the U.S. Navy during World War II. After returning to civilian life, he served as Ontario mayor for three more terms and was elected to the Oregon State Senate in 1948. He became president of the Senate in 1955. Smith was elevated to the governorship following the unexpected death of Governor Paul L. Patterson on January 31, 1956. A special election in November was called to fill the position for the final two years of Patterson's term. Smith won the Republication primary but lost in gubernatorial election to Democratic nominee Robert D. Holmes.

Smith was seen as having "a Horatio Alger success story" due to his humble beginnings. He was born in a log cabin and grew up to serve as governor. He was relatively unknown to the general public across Oregon when he was sworn-in, outside of statehouse political enthusiasts, local newspaper publishers, and the small rural communities of Eastern Oregon. When it came to his politics, The Oregonian in an editorial wrote Smith "earned a reputation as a plain-speaking man who applied the rule of common sense to problems of government. He was conservative in his views on taxation and middle-of-the-road on most subjects."

== Early life and education ==
Smith came from a long line of Dutch ancestors. He was born on November 19, 1909, in a log cabin near Grand Junction, Colorado. He was the fourth of seven surviving children. At age 9, he got his first newspaper job working as a paperboy for the Grand Junction Daily Sentinel. At age 10, his mother died, and at age 13, his father died, leaving him an orphan. He was then sent to live with his aunt and uncle on a cattle ranch near Wilder, Idaho. He supported himself financially as he pursued an education at the College of Idaho in Caldwell. Smith received his B.A. in history in 1932. While in school Smith met Dorothy Leininger who he married on October 8, 1933. After graduation, the couple moved to nearby Ontario, Oregon, just across the Snake River from Idaho.

In 1933, Smith and his wife Dorothy borrowed $25 from a former classmate to establish a mimeographed pennysaver in Ontario. Smith went on to work as an advertising manager at the Ontario Argus before buying his own press to start a rival newspaper in 1936 called the Eastern Oregon Observer. His son Dennis Alan Smith was born in 1938. The couple also had a daughter named Janice Elaine Smith.

== Career ==
=== Mayor of Ontario ===
At age 26, Smith was elected president of the Ontario Chamber of Commerce. At age 30, the newspaper publisher was elected Mayor of Ontario in 1940 by a margin of 44 votes. At the time, the town had a population around 3,500. Smith was considered young for his age and had beaten an incumbent running for his seventh term. Soon after taking office, Coronet, a national magazine, rated Smith as one of five outstanding mayors of small U.S. cities. Smith played a part in securing government aid from the Works Progress Administration and Civil Aeronautics Board to develop the Ontario Municipal Airport, making it one of the first airfields and civilian training programs at a small town in the U.S. This proved useful to the military when the nation entered WWII.

==== Japanese Americans ====
On Feb. 19, 1942, President Franklin D. Roosevelt signed Executive Order 9066, which led to the internment of Japanese Americans. However, Smith called for the federal government to allow Japanese Americans to settle in Ontario. Smith told the Associated Press "If the Japs, both alien and nationals, are a menace to the Pacific Coast safety unless they are moved inland, it appears downright cowardly to take any other stand than to put out the call, 'Send them along; we'll cooperate to the fullest possible extent in taking care of them.'" Following, the adoption of Civilian Restrictive Order 2, Japanese Americans living in Oregon were able to leave the makeshift living quarters at the Portland Assembly Center and move to Ontario. A population of about 134 in the city and surrounding county before the war ballooned to 1,000 as Malheur County recruited farm workers during the war.

At this time much of the West Coast supported their exclusion. "No Japs Allowed" signs were posted across the river in nearby Payette, Idaho. Smith hired Japanese Americans to care for his children. He also wrote positive editorials about Japanese immigrants to combat xenophobia. By 1950, Ontario boasted the highest Japanese-American population per capita in all of Oregon. "Elmo Smith encouraged the community to be compassionate to us, to understand that they needed us," Japanese American George Iseri said. "He said, 'These people are Americans. They're legal residents. They did nothing wrong.' He just had a lot of common sense."

==== Naval Air Transport Service ====
Smith was re-elected mayor but resigned halfway through his second term to enlist in the U.S. Navy during the Second World War. Smith, dubbed the "Flying Mayor," was named commander of eastern Oregon units of the Civil Air Patrol on April 3, 1942. His first assignment was searching for a missing Martin B-26 Marauder. Smith's squadron later helped deliver mail from Pendleton to Boise. Locals called the route the “coffin mail run.” Smith earned the rank of Lieutenant, serving in the Pacific Theater of Operations for 18 months. He flew transport planes, and later commanded an air transport base in the South Pacific. He won special commendation for leadership in a crisis. That was for the rescue of five survivors from a transport crash. Smith returned to civilian life at the war's conclusion, but would continue to fly planes at campaign events.

==== Return home ====
Upon returning to Ontario in March 1946, Smith resumed his role as publisher the Eastern Oregon Observer, which he had leased during his overseas deployment to Orval Thompson. Later that year in November Smith was elected Ontario mayor for a third term. He would go on to be elected mayor five times total. In December 1946, Smith sold the Observer to Jessica Longston and Robert Pollock and used the proceeds to purchase the Blue Mountain Eagle in June 1948. He later moved to John Day to manage the paper. That same day Smith and his friend Bill Robinson purchased The Madras Pioneer and the family business was incorporated as Blue Mountain Eagle Newspapers, Inc. Oscar W. Lange Jr. bought into the Pioneer a few months later as a third owner. Also of note, in July 1947, the City of Ontario under Smith issued and approved its first ever special tax levy.

=== Oregon State Senate ===
==== First session ====
In 1948, Smith was elected to represent Grant, Malheur, and Harney counties in the state senate. He would go on to be a leader in promoting legislation for good roads and clean water. But before taking office he was immediately met with a large amount attention as he was one of four senators who hadn't yet expressed their support for one of two candidates for senate president, with one reporter writing, "Smith has been the victim of ear-bending telephone conversations which have kept the long lines humming out of John Day and Ontario." The votes were tied until Smith switched his support from Carl Engdahl to William E. Walsh, who got the job.

==== Roads and highways ====
Smith served on the roads and highways committee in the 1949 session and was chairman in 1951. In that role, he pushed the legislation giving the Oregon State Highway Department the right to issue bonds to fix the state's aging roads. The program brought in $72 million and "transformed Oregon's highway's into economic assets."

Smith grew to statewide prominence in a fight against the trucking industry. The legislature passed a bill to add a weight-mile tax on trucks. Implementing the Motor Carrier Highway Transportation Tax Act was put to voters as a ballot measure. In response, long haul truckers pushed for a competing ballot measure which would amend the Constitution of Oregon to prohibit the weight-mile tax. Smith was under a lot of pressure from the truckers. Advertisers pulled their accounts out of the Blue Mountain Eagle and he was bombarded with telegrams. Smith wrote editorials in support of the tax and campaigned all over the state. His efforts proved successful. Voters passed the tax increase and overwhelmingly voted down the trucker's initiative in the 1952 election. For his efforts, one person said Smith was "probably the best-versed layman in highway problems and legislation in the state." Smith was re-elected to the senate in 1952.

==== Water Resources Board ====
Smith was the original sponsor of the Water Appropriation Act, which established the Water Resources Board, an agency created to manage and regulate Oregon's water resources. It was reorganized decades later into the Oregon Water Resources Department.

==== President of the Senate ====
Senator Smith was elected President of the Senate in 1955. He was expected to inherit the role of Oregon governor if incumbent Paul L. Patterson decided to run for the United States Senate in the 1956 election.

=== Governor of Oregon ===
Patterson announced his candidacy for the U.S. senate and two days later suffered a heart attack while meeting with political advisors in Portland. He died at 10 p.m. January 31, 1956. The next morning a state police car drove Smith six hours from John Day to Salem. He was sworn in as the 27th Governor of Oregon at 9:36 a.m. on Feb. 1. He was 46. Smith was the first licensed airplane pilot to serve as Oregon governor. He owned a private plane but agreed not to fly it while in office, a concession to party leaders who recalled the 1947 Oregon Beechcraft Bonanza crash that killed three state officials.

Upon taking the oath of office, Smith immediately began campaigning for the 1956 Oregon gubernatorial special election. He won the Republican primary against "token opposition" but was defeated in his attempt to win the governorship in his own right and complete the last two years of Patterson's term. Robert D. Holmes, his Democratic challenger, managed to win a narrow victory.

== Later life, death and legacy ==
In 1957, Smith became a co-owner of Democrat-Herald Publishing Co., which published the Albany Democrat-Herald. He then moved to Albany to work as the paper's publisher. A few years later, Smith returned to politics in a bid for the United States Senate seat opened by the death of Richard Neuberger in 1960. Smith lost the race to Maurine Neuberger, the Senator's widow. In 1961, Smith purchased the Hood River News and the Cottage Grove Sentinel. One year later, he was elected president of the Oregon Newspaper Publishers Association.

In 1964, Smith ran for a seat on the Republican National Committee. He withdrew his candidacy to accept the chairmanship of the Oregon Republican Party. That same year Smith acquired the Polk County Itemizer-Observer. In 1966, Smith and his wife took an around-the-world trip which he wrote about in his newspapers. A few years later, the couple toured East Asia and Australia, which he also documented. In 1968, Smith sold the Blue Mountain Eagle. Smith died of cancer on July 15, 1968, in Albany, at the age of 58. He was buried in the Willamette Memorial Park Mausoleum.

The Oregon Newspaper Publishers Association created the "Elmo Smith Award of General Excellence" in Smith's honor. The organization also inducted Smith into the Oregon Newspaper Hall of Fame in 1979.

Political offices
Preceded by Paul L. Patterson	Governor of Oregon; 1956–1957	Succeeded by Robert D. Holmes
Party political offices
Preceded by Paul L. Patterson	Republican nominee for Governor of Oregon; 1956	Succeeded by Mark Hatfield
Preceded by Guy Cordon	Republican nominee for U.S. Senator from Oregon (Class 2); 1960	Succeeded by Mark Hatfield
