= Senator Neuberger =

Senator Neuberger may refer to:

- Maurine Neuberger (1907–2000), U.S. Senator from Oregon from 1960 to 1967
- Richard L. Neuberger (1912–1960), U.S. Senator from Oregon from 1955 to 1960
