= 1956 Oregon gubernatorial special election =

- November 6, 1956
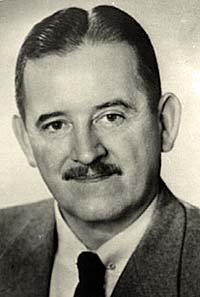

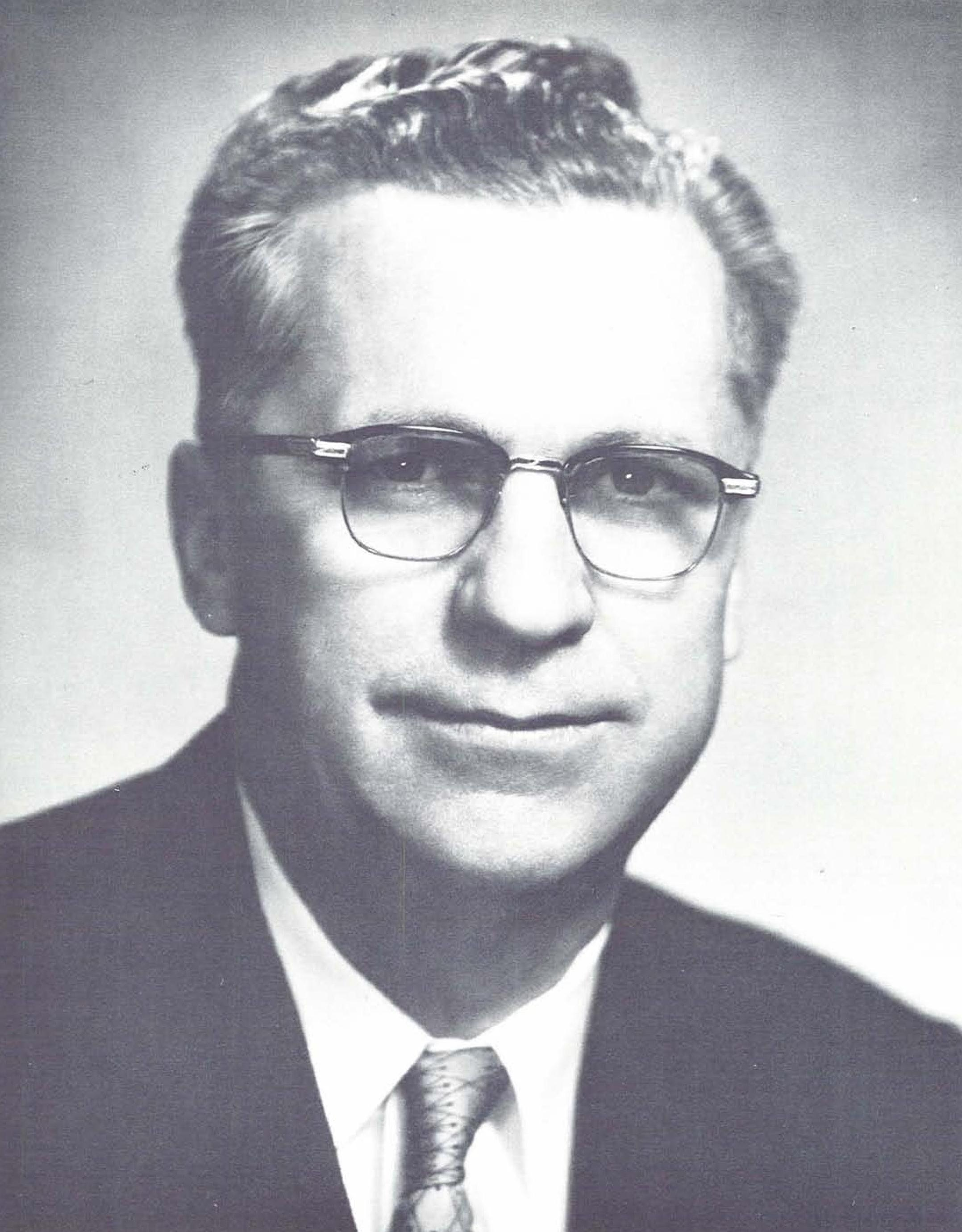
Nominee	Robert D. Holmes	Elmo Smith
Party	Democratic	Republican
Popular vote	369,439	361,840
Percentage	50.52%	49.48%
- County results Holmes: 50–60% 60–70% Smith: 50–60% 60–70%
Governor before election
Elmo Smith
Republican
Elected Governor
Robert D. Holmes
Democratic

The 1956 Oregon gubernatorial special election took place on November 6, 1956. Democratic state senator Robert D. Holmes narrowly defeated Republican incumbent Elmo Smith to win the election.

== Background ==
On January 31, 1956, Governor Paul L. Patterson, who was elected in the 1954 gubernatorial election, died in office of a coronary occlusion. Patterson's death elevated Oregon State Senate President Elmo Smith to governor and a special election for November was called to fill the position for the final two years of Patterson's term. The succession law was changed in 1972 so that the Oregon Secretary of State is first in line to succeed the governor.

== Primary election ==
Oregon held primary elections on May 18, 1956.

=== Republican party ===
==== Candidates ====
- Earl L. Dickson
- Elmo Smith, incumbent governor

==== Results ====
Republican primary results
Party	Candidate	Votes	%
Republican	Elmo Smith (inc.)	225,748	91.01%
Republican	Earl L. Dickson	22,306	8.99%
Total votes		248,054	100.00%

=== Democratic party ===
Lew Wallace sought the Democratic nomination for a fourth time, but narrowly lost to Robert D. Holmes.

==== Candidates ====
- Robert D. Holmes, member of Oregon State Senate
- Lew Wallace, Democratic nominee for governor in 1942 and 1948

==== Results ====
Democratic primary results
Party	Candidate	Votes	%
Democratic	Robert D. Holmes	112,307	50.79%
Democratic	Lew Wallace	108,822	49.21%
Total votes		221,129	100.00%

== General election ==
=== Results ===
1956 Oregon gubernatorial special election
Party	Candidate	Votes	%	±%
Democratic	Robert D. Holmes	369,439	50.52%	+7.43%
Republican	Elmo Smith (inc.)	361,840	49.48%	−7.43%
Total votes		731,279	100.00%	
Majority		7,599	1.04%	
Democratic gain from Republican		Swing	+14.86%	

=== Results by county ===
Clackamas County, Douglas County, and Tillamook County voted Democratic for the first time since 1922. By voting for Smith, Jefferson County backed the losing candidate for the first time since its establishment in 1914.

County	Robert D. Holmes Democratic		Elmo Smith Republican		Margin		Total votes cast
County	#	%	#	%	#	%	Total votes cast
Baker	3,554	50.71%	3,455	49.29%	99	1.41%	7,009
Benton	5,217	39.89%	7,862	60.11%	-2,645	-20.22%	13,079
Clackamas	23,431	51.28%	22,264	48.72%	1,167	2.55%	45,695
Clatsop	7,928	61.41%	4,981	38.59%	2,947	22.83%	12,909
Columbia	6,185	63.02%	3,629	36.98%	2,556	26.04%	9,814
Coos	12,130	60.24%	8,005	39.76%	4,125	20.49%	20,135
Crook	1,848	49.93%	1,853	50.07%	-5	-0.14%	3,701
Curry	2,162	50.91%	2,085	49.09%	77	1.81%	4,247
Deschutes	4,441	46.33%	5,145	53.67%	-704	-7.34%	9,586
Douglas	13,516	52.62%	12,171	47.38%	1,345	5.24%	25,687
Gilliam	505	38.52%	806	61.48%	-301	-22.96%	1,311
Grant	1,313	42.44%	1,781	57.56%	-468	-15.13%	3,094
Harney	1,171	43.26%	1,536	56.74%	-365	-13.48%	2,707
Hood River	2,618	47.08%	2,943	52.92%	-325	-5.84%	5,561
Jackson	13,445	45.26%	16,261	54.74%	-2,816	-9.48%	29,706
Jefferson	1,131	45.88%	1,334	54.12%	-203	-8.24%	2,465
Josephine	5,423	42.60%	7,308	57.40%	-1,885	-14.81%	12,731
Klamath	8,956	49.81%	9,026	50.19%	-70	-0.39%	17,982
Lake	1,285	44.62%	1,595	55.38%	-310	-10.76%	2,880
Lane	33,241	53.12%	29,335	46.88%	3,906	6.24%	62,576
Lincoln	5,149	52.08%	4,738	47.92%	411	4.16%	9,887
Linn	11,807	51.91%	10,936	48.09%	871	3.83%	22,743
Malheur	3,011	37.51%	5,016	62.49%	-2,005	-24.98%	8,027
Marion	19,255	42.87%	25,655	57.13%	-6,400	-14.25%	44,910
Morrow	882	45.07%	1,075	54.93%	-193	-9.86%	1,957
Multnomah	129,273	53.04%	114,446	46.96%	14,827	6.08%	243,719
Polk	4,724	45.39%	5,683	54.61%	-959	-9.21%	10,407
Sherman	415	38.53%	662	61.47%	-247	-22.93%	1,077
Tillamook	4,055	50.93%	3,907	49.07%	148	1.86%	7,962
Umatilla	8,376	48.88%	8,761	51.12%	-385	-2.25%	17,137
Union	4,272	53.45%	3,720	46.55%	552	6.91%	7,992
Wallowa	1,755	53.17%	1,546	46.83%	209	6.33%	3,301
Wasco	4,522	52.73%	4,053	47.27%	469	5.47%	8,575
Washington	15,976	44.51%	19,917	55.49%	-3,941	-10.98%	35,893
Wheeler	540	46.59%	619	53.41%	-79	-6.82%	1,159
Yamhill	5,927	43.40%	7,731	56.60%	-1,804	-13.21%	13,658
Total	369,439	50.52%	361,840	49.48%	7,599	1.04%	731,279

==== Counties that flipped from Republican to Democratic ====
- Clackamas
- Clatsop
- Curry
- Douglas
- Lane
- Lincoln
- Linn
- Multnomah
- Tillamook
- Wallowa
