= Hall S. Lusk =

American judge

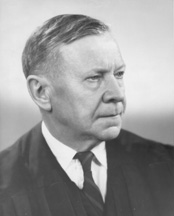

United States Senator from Oregon
- In office March 16, 1960 – November 8, 1960
- Appointed by: Mark Hatfield
- Preceded by: Richard L. Neuberger
- Succeeded by: Maurine Brown Neuberger

30th Chief Justice of the Oregon Supreme Court
- In office 1949–1951
- Preceded by: George Rossman2
- Succeeded by: James T. Brand

60th Justice of the Oregon Supreme Court
- In office 1937–1968
- Appointed by: Charles H. Martin
- Preceded by: James U. Campbell
- Succeeded by: Thomas Tongue

Personal details
- Born: Hall Stoner Lusk; September 21, 1883 Washington, D.C., U.S.
- Died: May 15, 1983 (aged 99) Beaverton, Oregon, U.S.
- Party: Democratic

Hall Stoner Lusk (September 21, 1883 – May 15, 1983) was an American jurist in the state of Oregon. A native of the District of Columbia, he became a judge in Oregon, serving in both the Oregon circuit courts and later on the Oregon Supreme Court, including time as its chief justice. A Democrat, he was appointed to the United States Senate for eight months in 1960 after the death of sitting Senator Richard L. Neuberger.

== Early life ==
Hall Lusk was born in Washington, D.C., on September 21, 1883, to Charles Rufus and Florence Speake Lusk. His father was the long-time secretary of the Bureau of Catholic Indian Affairs. Mary Ellen Sherman was his Godmother. He attended Georgetown Preparatory School in DC from 1897 to 1900, and then graduated from Georgetown University in 1904. In 1907, Lusk graduated from Georgetown Law School, earning a bachelor of laws degree. He was a law clerk to a chief judge of the United States Court of Appeals for the District of Columbia Circuit from 1906 to 1909, and was admitted to the District of Columbia bar in 1907.

== Legal career ==
In 1909, Lusk moved to the state of Oregon where he passed the bar in 1910 and entered private legal practice in Portland. From 1918 to 1920, he served as an assistant United States Attorney for Oregon, and in 1922 ran unsuccessfully for a seat in the Oregon Legislature. While in private practice he represented the Society of Sisters, and wrote their brief submitted to the United States Supreme Court in Pierce v. Society of Sisters of the Holy Names of Jesus and Mary.

== Political career ==
Lusk was circuit judge of Multnomah County from 1930 to 1937. Shortly after becoming a judge, he oversaw the trial of the Lessards' harpooning of Ethelbert. The orca had swum up the Columbia River and was the news of the day. The Lessard's were fined for killing a fish without a hook and line. Judge Lusk, as Time magazine wrote, "Like almost everybody else, he knew, and explained to the jury in directing an acquittal, that a whale, which breathes air and suckles its young, is no fish." On July 22, 1937, Oregon Governor Charles H. Martin appointed him to the Oregon Supreme Court to replace James U. Campbell who had died in office. Lusk was elected to a full six-year term in 1938 and then re-elected to successive terms in 1944, 1950, and 1956. He was the court's Chief Justice from 1949 to 1951.

On March 15, 1960, he resigned from the court in order to be appointed to Congress. The next day Governor Mark Hatfield appointed Lusk as a Democrat to the U.S. Senate to fill the vacancy caused by the death of Richard L. Neuberger and served from March 16, 1960, to November 8, 1960. He was not a candidate for election to a full term and returned to Oregon Supreme Court as a justice pro tempore in 1961, serving until 1968.

== Life and family ==
He entered private practice in Portland, but had to work in a lumber yard to make ends meet. He met Catherine Emmons, daughter of a prominent Portland family, who were not thrilled that their daughter was being courted by Lusk. The Emmons sent Catherine around the world for a year to forget him. On September 30, 1914, he married Catherine Emmons, and they would have five children, all daughters. Lusk was a lifelong practicing Roman Catholic.

== Later life ==
After leaving the court he engaged in the revision of Oregon Supreme Court procedures as justice emeritus and resided in Beaverton. Hall Stoner Lusk died on May 15, 1983, in Beaverton, four months shy of his 100th birthday. Interment was at Mt. Calvary Chapel, Portland.

U.S. Senate
Preceded by Richard L. Neuberger	U.S. senator (Class 2) from Oregon; March 16, 1960 – November 8, 1960; Served alongside: Wayne Morse	Succeeded by Maurine Brown Neuberger
Honorary titles
Preceded by John Milton	Oldest living U.S. senator April 14, 1977 – May 15, 1983	Succeeded by Stephen Young
