= Guy Cordon =

American politician (1890–1969)

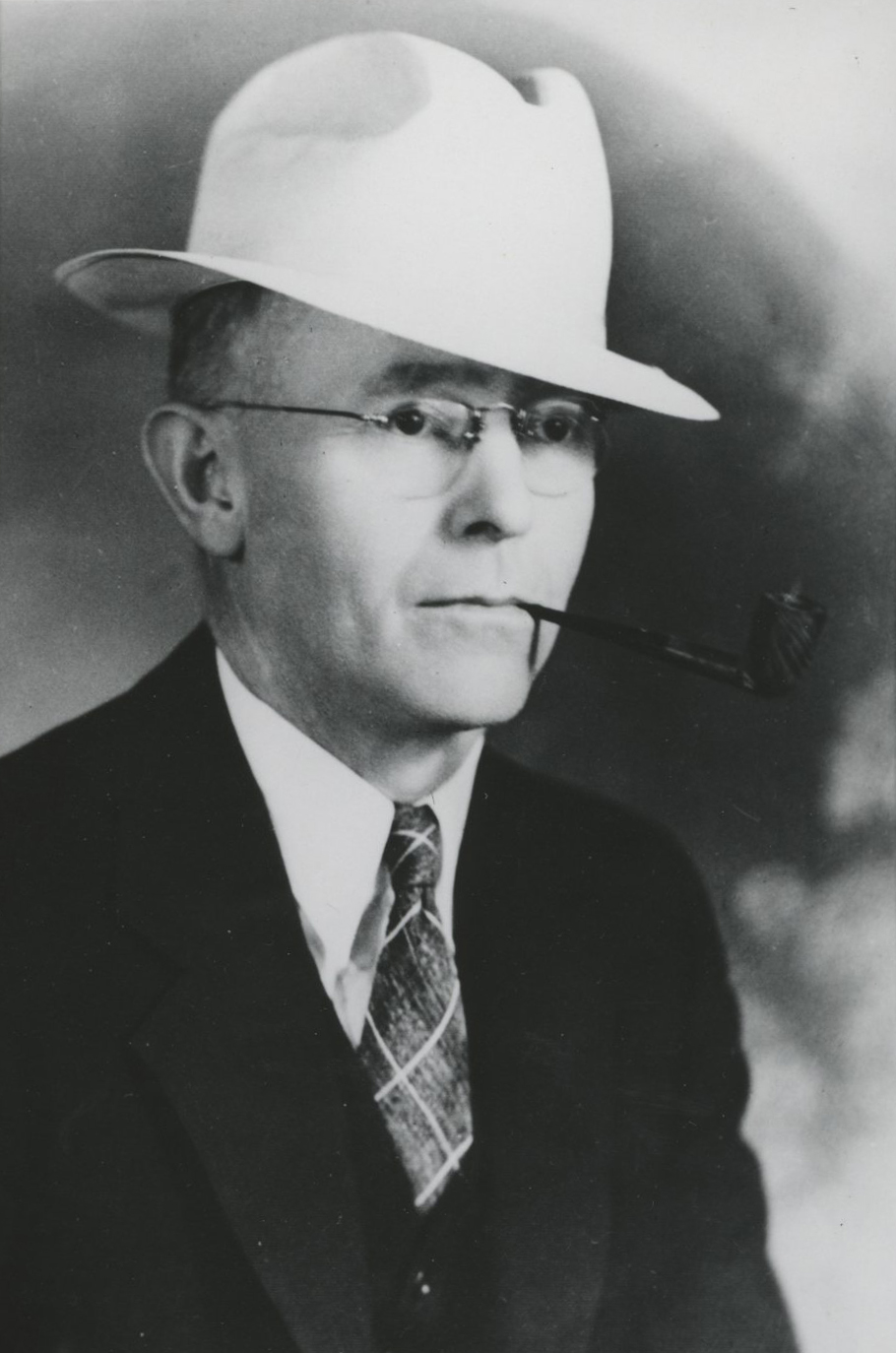
- Cordon in 1944

United States Senator from Oregon
- In office March 4, 1944 – January 3, 1955
- Preceded by: Charles L. McNary
- Succeeded by: Richard L. Neuberger

Personal details
- Born: April 24, 1890 Cuero, Texas, U.S.
- Died: June 8, 1969 (aged 79) Washington, D.C., U.S.
- Party: Republican
- Spouse: Ana Allen
- Profession: Attorney

Guy F. Cordon (April 24, 1890 – June 8, 1969) was an American author, politician and lawyer from the state of Oregon. A native of Texas, he served in the Army during World War I and later was the district attorney of Douglas County in Southern Oregon. A Republican, he was appointed and later won election to the United States Senate, serving in office from 1944 to 1955.

== Early life ==
Guy Cordon was born in Cuero, DeWitt County, Texas, on April 24, 1890. He moved with his family to Roseburg, Oregon, in 1896, and attended the public schools in that city. In 1909, at the age of 19, he became the deputy tax assessor of Douglas County, Oregon, serving until 1916. In 1914, Cordon married Ana Allen, and they had two children. During World War I he enlisted in the Army and served in the artillery.

== Political career ==
In 1917 he began serving as the county tax assessor, remaining until 1919. Cordon studied law and then passed the bar in 1920. From 1923 to 1935 he served as the district attorney of Douglas County and then practiced law in Roseburg. Cordon then began working as the lawyer for a group of 18 counties suing the federal government as an outgrowth of the Oregon land fraud scandal involving land grants for the Oregon and California Railroad.

In 1944, Cordon was appointed to a seat in the United States Senate from Oregon by Governor Earl Snell following the death of Senator Charles L. McNary. In a special election in November 1944, Cordon was elected to finish the term, receiving 57% of the vote against Democrat Willis Mahoney. Longtime Senator Wayne Morse was elected to his first term in the Senate in that election. Cordon was elected to a full six-year term in 1948, receiving 60% of the vote against Democrat Manley J. Wilson. In 1954, a bad year for Republicans, Cordon was defeated for re-election by Democrat Richard L. Neuberger by a margin of 50.2% to 49.8%.

While in the Senate, Cordon suggested a Senate rule (adopted as Rule XXVI part 12, known as the Cordon Rule) that Senate committee reports should indicate how provisions in a bill would change current law. Cordon served as chairman of the Committee on Interior and Insular Affairs from 1954 until his term expired in 1955. He visited Hawaii to conduct hearings on possible statehood for the then-territory (Hawaii was admitted in 1959). He was in the Senate from March 4, 1944, to January 3, 1955. Cordon was a supporter of Joseph McCarthy, viewing the Democrats as "soft on Communism."

== Later years ==
After leaving the Senate, he practiced law in Washington, D.C., from 1955 to 1962, when he retired. During the early 1950s, Frank Herbert, who would later become a famous science fiction author, was one of Cordon's speechwriters. Guy F. Cordon died in Washington, D.C., on June 8, 1969, at the age of 79 and was buried in Roseburg at the Roseburg Memorial Gardens.

== See also ==
- Ramseyer Rule

Party political offices
Preceded by Charles L. McNary	Republican nominee for U.S. Senator from Oregon (Class 2); 1944, 1948, 1954	Succeeded by Elmo Smith
U.S. Senate
Preceded by Charles L. McNary	U.S. senator (Class 2) from Oregon; 1944–1955; Served alongside: Rufus C. Holman, Wayne Morse	Succeeded by Richard L. Neuberger
