= Robert D. Holmes =

28th Governor of Oregon

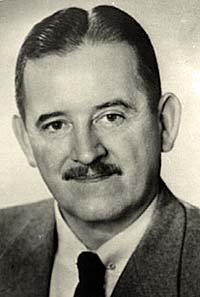

28th Governor of Oregon
- In office January 14, 1957 – January 12, 1959
- Preceded by: Elmo Smith
- Succeeded by: Mark Hatfield

Oregon State Senator
- In office 1949–1957
- Constituency: Clatsop County

Personal details
- Born: May 11, 1909 Canisteo, New York, U.S.
- Died: June 6, 1976 (aged 67) Seaside, Oregon, U.S.
- Resting place: Wilhelm's Portland Memorial Portland, Oregon
- Party: Democratic
- Spouse: Marie Hoy (m. 1934)
- Children: 2
- Education: University of Oregon
- Profession: Broadcaster, Politician

Robert Denison Holmes (May 11, 1909 – June 6, 1976) was an American politician and journalist from the U.S. state of Oregon. A native of the state of New York, he worked in newspapers and radio before entering politics. Though a Republican early in his career, he served as a Democrat in the Oregon State Senate and as the 28th governor of Oregon. He was governor from 1957 to 1959.

== Early life ==
Holmes was born on May 11, 1909, in Canisteo, New York, to a family with five other siblings. His parents were George and Amy Holmes (née Crary), and his father was a stockbroker. Holmes graduated from high school in 1925 from West High School in Rochester, New York. Following his graduation the entire family moved west to Oregon and settled in Portland.

Holmes then worked for several newspapers in Portland for a short time before he enrolled at the University of Oregon in Eugene. He entered in 1928 and graduated in 1932. Following college he returned to the newspaper business, working for the Oregon Journal and The Oregonian, both in Portland. Holmes then moved to Astoria along the Oregon Coast in 1937 where he was involved in advertising and radio broadcasting, serving as general manager of KAST from 1943 to 1957.

== Political career ==
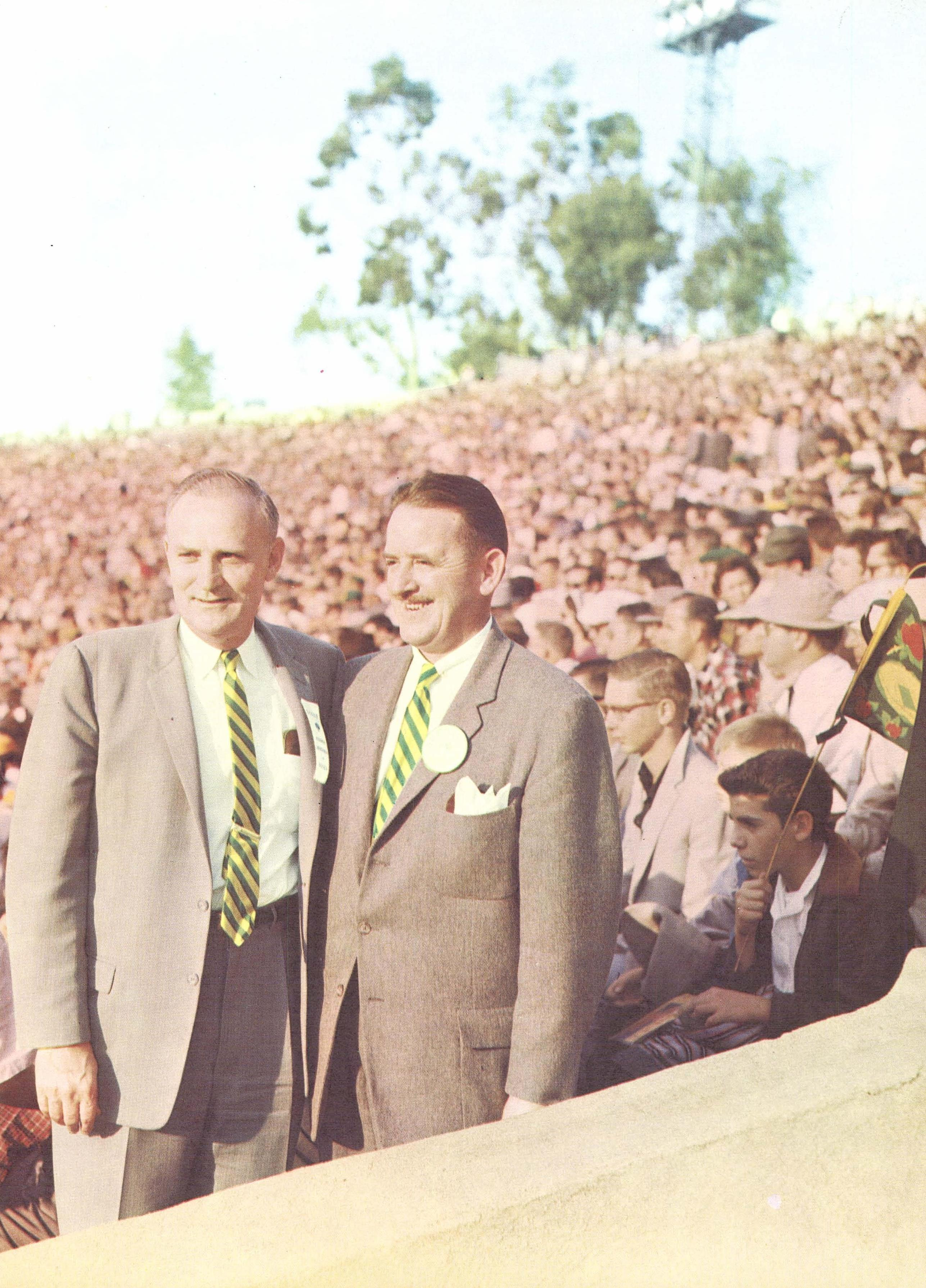
Holmes (right) with University of Oregon President O. Meredith Wilson at the 1958 Rose Bowl

Originally a Republican, he began his political career in local politics in Clatsop County. Holmes first served on the school board for Gearhart south of Astoria, and then on the school board for all the rural schools in the county. After becoming a Democrat, Holmes was elected in 1948 to the Oregon State Senate and re-elected in 1952. He was the first Democratic senator from the county in 64 years. His legislative career was marked by successfully fending off legislation he deemed would threaten the state's fisheries, and in the midst of the McCarthy era, going on record against a special loyalty oath for teachers. Additionally, Holmes supported passage of such civil rights legislation as a fair employment law and the outlawing of discrimination in public places. He was appointed by Governor Paul L. Patterson as the chair of the Education Committee in 1953.

=== Governor ===
In 1956, Holmes was elected Governor, to complete the two years remaining on the term of Patterson, who had died in office. Holmes defeated Lew Wallace in the primary and Elmo Smith, the Republican state Senate president who had assumed the job after Patterson's death in the general election. Holmes was the first Democrat in 18 years to serve as Oregon's governor, and the first Democrat in 22 years to win an Oregon gubernatorial election.

Holmes convened a special session of the Oregon Legislature, for the purpose of lowering taxes, in his first year as governor. Reacting to an unexpected budget surplus, he initially proposed a 10% tax cut, as well as a $5 million per year contribution to the Common School Fund, which would also have served to reduce taxes. The 19 day session concluded in mid-November; the compromise reached between House Democrats and Senate Republicans reflected a 20% cut in taxes. The Associated Press identified the tax session as the number one news story in the state in 1957, ahead of the prosecution of the Teamsters.

While in office, Holmes sought to make state government more efficient and responsive. He supported public power development, and the abolition of capital punishment. He commuted every death sentence during his governorship. Holmes also worked to reform education, welfare programs, and also cut taxes by 16%. In 1958, he lost his bid for re-election in a landslide to Oregon Secretary of State Mark Hatfield, a rising star in the Oregon Republican Party.

== Later life and family ==
Holmes and Marie Hoy were married on May 1, 1934, and they had two sons, Robert Jr. and George. Following his governorship, Holmes hosted a television public affairs program on Portland's KOIN, and served on the Oregon Board of Higher Education from 1969 to 1974. From 1961 to 1962, Holmes also was on a commission that hoped to revise the Oregon Constitution. A one-time Christian Scientist, Holmes attended the Episcopal Church. Robert D. Holmes died on June 6, 1976, in Astoria of cancer.

Political offices
Preceded by Elmo Smith	Governor of Oregon; 1957–1959	Succeeded by Mark Hatfield
Party political offices
Preceded by Joseph K. Carson	Democratic nominee for Governor of Oregon; 1956, 1958	Succeeded by Robert Y. Thornton
