= Richard L. Neuberger =

American politician (1912–1960)

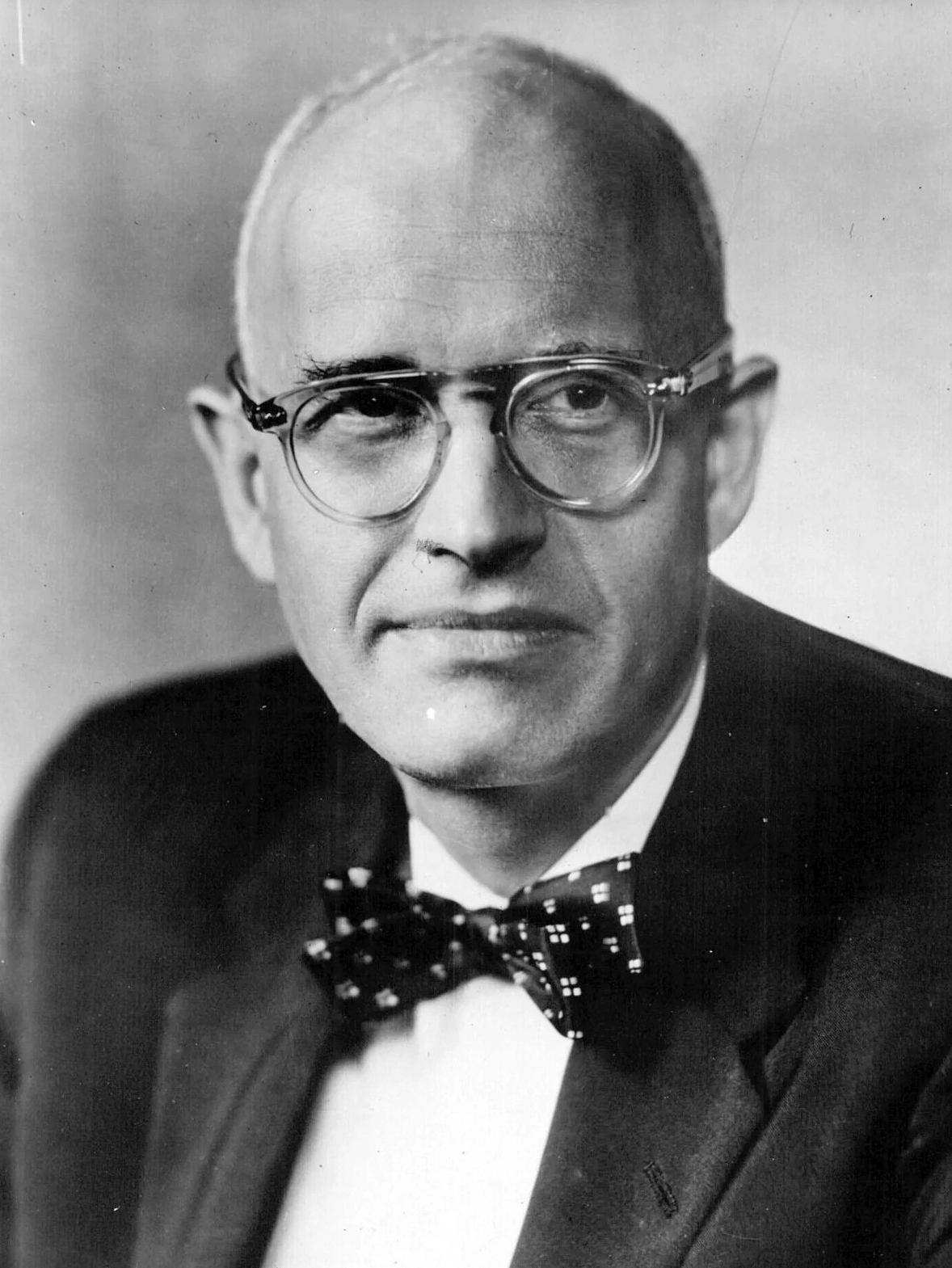

United States Senator from Oregon
- In office January 3, 1955 – March 9, 1960
- Preceded by: Guy Cordon
- Succeeded by: Hall S. Lusk

Member of the Oregon State Senate
- In office 1949–1954

Member of the Oregon House of Representatives
- In office 1941–1942
- Constituency: Multnomah County

Personal details
- Born: Richard Lewis Neuberger; December 26, 1912 Multnomah County, Oregon, U.S.
- Died: March 9, 1960 (aged 47) Portland, Oregon, U.S.
- Party: Democratic
- Spouse: Maurine Brown (m. 1945)
- Education: University of Oregon
- Profession: Journalist

Richard Lewis Neuberger (December 26, 1912 – March 9, 1960) was an American journalist, author, and politician during the middle of the 20th century. A native of Oregon, he wrote for The New York Times before and after a stint in the U.S. Army during World War II. A Democrat, he entered politics in his home state by winning a seat in the Oregon House of Representatives and later was elected to the United States Senate. His widow, Maurine Brown Neuberger, won his Senate seat after his death.

== Early life ==
Neuberger was born on December 26, 1912, in the rural part of Multnomah County, Oregon, the son of Ruth (Lewis) and Isaac Neuberger, restaurant owners. His grandparents were all German Jewish immigrants. Neuberger grew up in nearby Portland. He graduated from the University of Oregon in 1935, and served as editor of the student newspaper, the Oregon Daily Emerald. Neuberger began writing for The New York Times as a college senior, and became the newspaper's Northwest correspondent in 1939. He also began writing books during these years.

== Political career ==
In 1940, Neuberger was elected to the Oregon House of Representatives. His political career was interrupted by World War II, during which Neuberger served in the U.S. Army as an officer from 1942 to 1945. Back in civilian life, Neuberger continued to work for the Times and write books, and was elected to the Oregon State Senate in 1948, after losing in 1946. Neuberger and State Senator and future Governor Robert Holmes were two of the leading liberals in the Oregon legislature at a time of Republican dominance. During the 1949 legislative session, Democrats succeeded in forcing a vote in favor of one of the nation's first fair employment practices laws, though watered down by the Republican majority.

In 1954, Neuberger was elected as a Democrat to one of Oregon's United States Senate seats. He was the first Democrat to win a seat in the Senate from Oregon since 1914. On July 7, 1955, he introduced into the Congressional Record a call for the total abolition of all motor racing in the United States.

A vigorous and outspoken liberal, he served in the Senate until his death of a cerebral hemorrhage at the age of 47. Diagnosed with testicular cancer in 1958 that became terminal by 1960—but was kept from the public—Neuberger remained at his N.W. Portland home in early 1960, reportedly battling the flu. Though still publicly seeking re-election, he told his campaign chair, attorney Jack Beatty, "Remember, there's always another Neuberger," referring to his wife. The comment, combined with Neuberger's reluctance to meet in public and weak voice on the phone, led Beatty to believe that Neuberger's condition was grave, a suspicion confirmed by the Senator's physician shortly before Neuberger died at Good Samaritan Hospital on March 9, 1960. A delegation of senators, led by Democratic Majority Leader Lyndon Johnson, attended Neuberger's funeral. He was buried at Beth Israel Cemetery in Portland.

=== Feud with Wayne Morse ===
Toward the end of the 1950s, Neuberger's relationship with Wayne Morse, the senior senator from Oregon, deteriorated and led to much public feuding. The two had known each other since 1931, when Morse was dean of the University of Oregon law school, and Neuberger was a 19-year-old freshman. Morse befriended Neuberger and often gave him advice, and he used his rhetorical skill to successfully defend Neuberger against charges of academic cheating. After the charges against him were dropped, Neuberger rejected Morse's advice to leave the university and start fresh elsewhere but instead enrolled in Morse's class in criminal law. Morse gave him a "D" in the course and, when Neuberger complained, changed the grade to an "F".

According to Mason Drukman, one of Morse's biographers, even after the two men had become senators, neither could get past what had happened in 1931. "Whatever his accomplishments", Drukman writes, "Neuberger was to Morse a man flawed in character" while Neuberger "could not forgive Morse either for propelling him out of law school ... or for having had to protect him in the honor proceedings". Morse later helped Neuberger, who won his Senate seat in 1954 by only 2,462 votes out of more than a half-million cast, but he also continued to give Neuberger advice that was not always appreciated. "I don't think you should scold me so much," said Neuberger, as quoted by Drukman, in a letter to Morse during the 1954 campaign.

By 1957, the relationship had deteriorated to the point where, rather than talking face-to-face, the senators exchanged angry letters delivered almost daily by messenger between offices in close proximity. Although the letters were private, the feud quickly became public through letters leaked to the press and comments made to colleagues and other third parties, who often had trouble deciding what the fight was about. Drukman describes the feud as a "classic struggle ... of dominating father and rebellious son locked in the age-old fight for supremacy". The feud ended only with Neuberger's death in 1960.

== Legacy and family ==
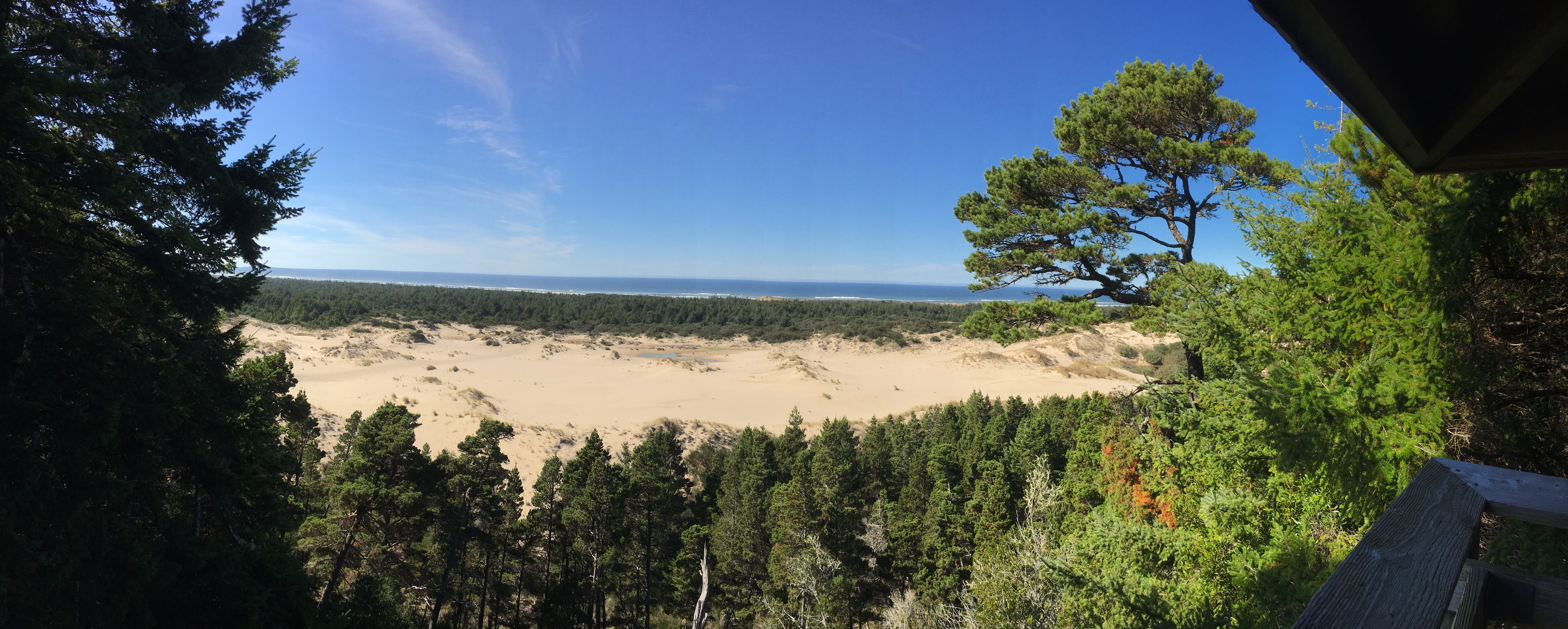
Oregon Dunes National Recreation Area, as seen from the Overlook at 81100 US-101, Gardiner, OR 97441

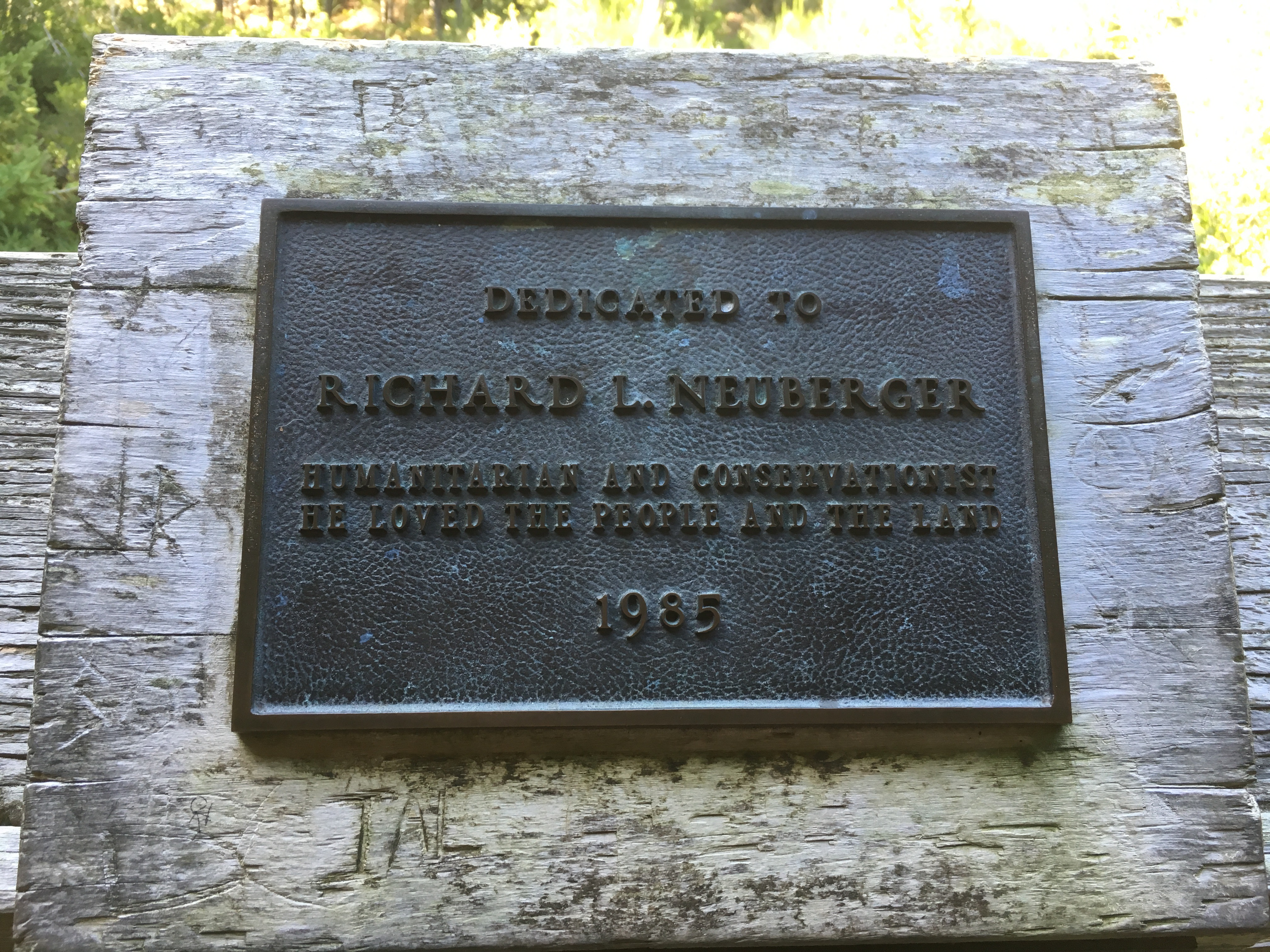
Dedication plaque at Oregon Dunes Overlook, Oregon Dunes National Recreation Area

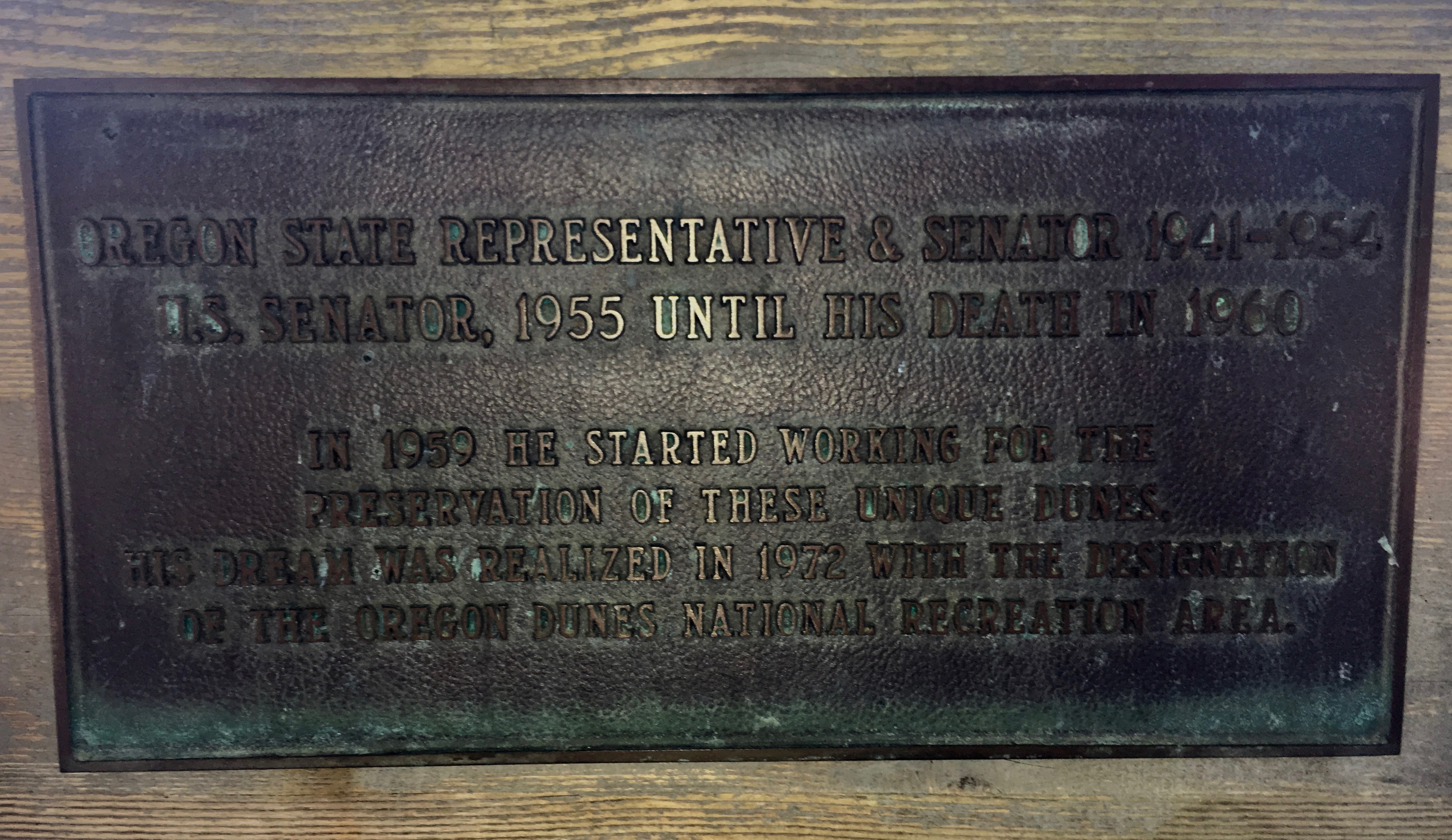
Plaque at Oregon Dunes National Recreation Area, Oregon Dunes Overlook

One lasting mark Neuberger left as a Senator was the creation of the Oregon Dunes National Recreation Area on the Pacific Coast of Oregon. A member of the Wilderness Society, he initially introduced a bill for creation of the Dunes Recreation Area in 1959. After being defeated 12 years in a row, the bill was finally signed into law in 1972. He was also responsible for sponsoring the initial version of the Alaska Mental Health Enabling Act of 1956.

Neuberger was married in 1945 to Maurine Brown, who was elected to Neuberger's U.S. Senate seat for a six-year term after his death. They had no children.

Portland State University's Neuberger Hall was named after the senator from 1972 to 2018. Following renovations in 2018, the hall was renamed Fariborz Maseeh Hall and the name was transferred to PSU's Richard and Maurine Neuberger Center office building.

== Writings ==
- An Army of the Aged. Caldwell : Caxton Press, 1936. (Co-written by Kelley Loe.)
- Integrity: the Life of George W. Norris. New York: Vanguard Press, 1937.
- Our Promised Land. New York : Macmillan, 1938.
- The Lewis and Clark Expedition. New York: Random House, 1951.
- Royal Canadian Mounted Police. New York: Random House, 1953.
- Adventures in Politics: We Go to the Legislature. New York: Oxford University, 1954.

== See also ==
- List of Jewish members of the United States Congress
- List of members of the United States Congress who died in office (1950–1999)

Party political offices
Preceded by Manley J. Wilson	Democratic nominee for U.S. Senator from Oregon (Class 2); 1954	Succeeded by Maurine Neuberger
U.S. Senate
Preceded by Guy Cordon	U.S. senator (Class 2) from Oregon; 1955–1960; Served alongside: Wayne Morse	Succeeded by Hall S. Lusk
