= Maurine Neuberger =

American politician (1907–2000)

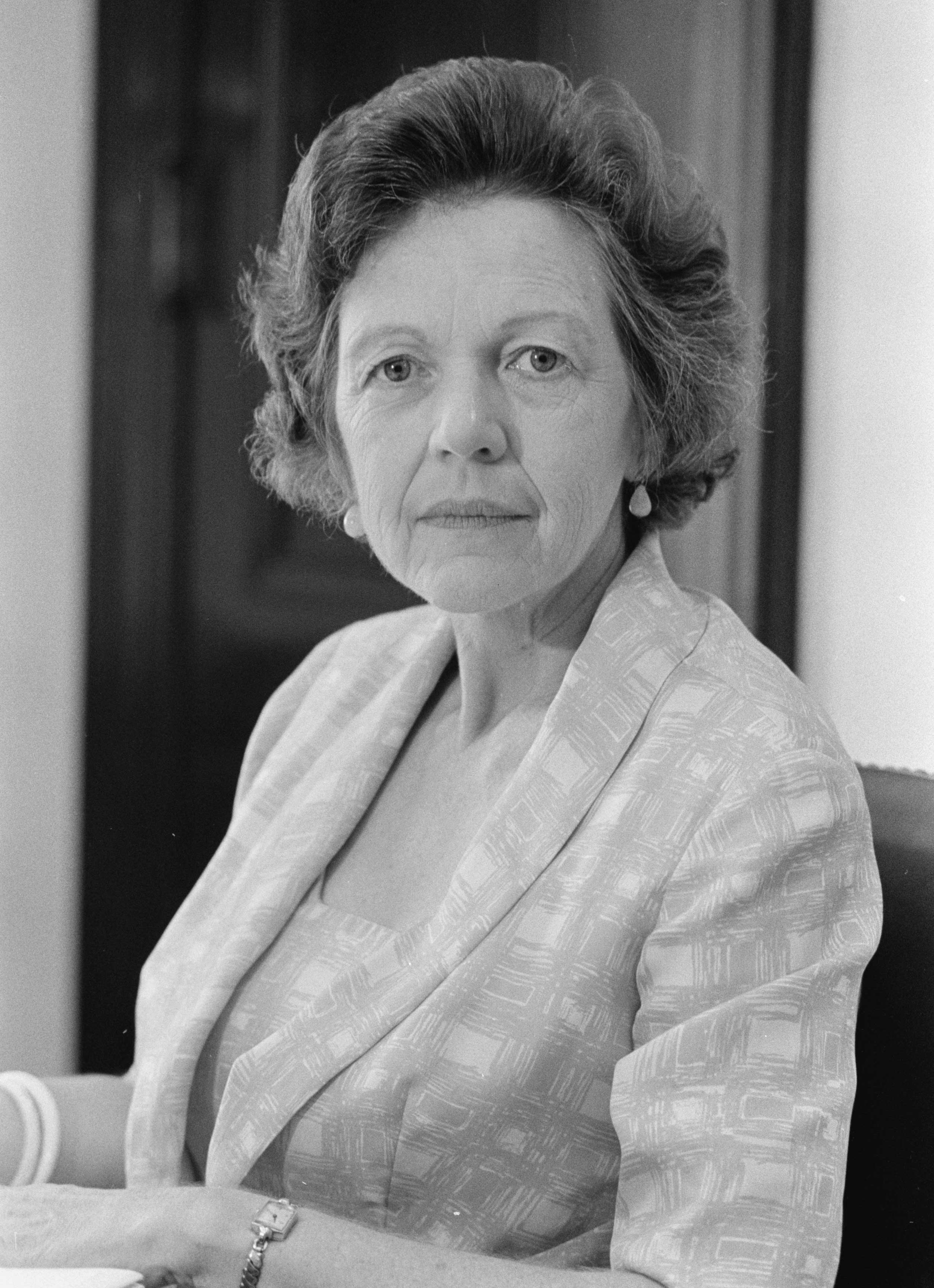

United States Senator from Oregon
- In office November 9, 1960 – January 3, 1967
- Preceded by: Hall Lusk
- Succeeded by: Mark Hatfield

Personal details
- Born: Maurine Brown; January 9, 1907 Cloverdale, Oregon, U.S.
- Died: February 22, 2000 (aged 93) Portland, Oregon, U.S.
- Resting place: Beth Israel Cemetery (Portland, Oregon)
- Party: Democratic
- Spouses: Richard Neuberger (m. 1945; died 1960); Philip Solomon (m. 1964; div. 1967)
- Education: Western Oregon University (attended); University of Oregon (BA); University of California, Los Angeles (attended)

Maurine Neuberger-Solomon (née Brown; January 9, 1907 – February 22, 2000) was an American politician who served as a United States senator for the State of Oregon from November 1960 to January 1967. She was the sixth woman elected to the United States Senate and the tenth woman to serve in the body. She and her husband, Richard L. Neuberger, are regarded as the U.S. Senate's first husband-and-wife legislative team. To date (2026), she is the only woman elected to the U.S. Senate from Oregon.

== Early life ==
Neuberger was born in Cloverdale, Tillamook County, Oregon. She attended public schools, the Oregon College of Education at Monmouth, Oregon from 1922 to 1924, and graduated from the University of Oregon in 1929 with a Bachelor of Arts. She was an alumna of the Delta Zeta sorority. She was selected to Mortar Board National College Senior Honor Society in her junior year. She then undertook graduate study at the University of California at Los Angeles from 1936 to 1937. Brown was a teacher in Oregon public schools between 1932 and 1944; in 1937, while teaching in a Portland high school, she met Richard L. Neuberger. The couple married in 1945, after Neuberger completed his service in World War II.

== Political career ==
Maurine Neuberger entered politics herself in 1950 when she was elected a member of the State House of Representatives and served from 1950 to 1955. In 1952, when she was reelected to the state House and her husband was reelected to the state Senate, she won with more votes than her husband. During this period she was also a member of the board of directors of the American Association for the United Nations. Richard was elected to the United States Senate in 1954.

In 1960, Richard died of cancer. Maurine then won a special election on November 8, 1960, as the Democratic candidate to fill the vacancy caused by the death of her husband. Hall S. Lusk had been appointed by the governor to the Senate upon Richard's death. After the election, Maurine completed Richard's remaining term from November 9, 1960, to January 3, 1961. At the same time as the special election, she won the general election for the term commencing January 3, 1961, and ending January 3, 1967; she was not a candidate for reelection in 1966. A 1965 article noted that Governor Mark Hatfield addressed correspondence to the Senator to her married name, Maurine Neuberger-Solomon, with the intention of making her 1964 remarriage an issue in a potential 1966 campaign.

Her activities in government focused on consumer, environmental and health issues, including the sponsorship of one of the first bills to require warning labels on cigarette packaging. Time described her in 1964 as a "a longtime crusader for labeling laws".

In 1961, President John F. Kennedy appointed her to be a member of the Presidential Commission on the Status of Women. In 1965-68 she and Muriel Fox co-chaired then-Vice President Hubert Humphrey's task force on Women's Goals.

== Later life ==
Maurine married Philip Solomon M.D., Clinical Professor of Psychiatry at Harvard Medical School and Physician-in-Chief, Psychiatry Service, Boston City Hospital, on July 11, 1964, in Washington, DC. They divorced in 1967.

Following her time in the Senate she was employed as a lecturer on consumer affairs and the status of women, and as teacher of American government at Boston University, the Radcliffe Institute of Advanced Studies at Harvard University, and Reed College. She was a resident of Portland, Oregon, until her death on February 22, 2000, at the age of 93, of a bone marrow disorder. She is interred in Beth Israel Cemetery in Portland, Oregon.

== See also ==
- Women in the United States Senate

Party political offices
Preceded by Richard L. Neuberger	Democratic nominee for U.S. Senator from Oregon (Class 2); 1960	Succeeded by Robert Duncan
U.S. Senate
Preceded by Hall Lusk	United States Senator (Class 2) from Oregon; 1960–1967; Served alongside: Wayne Morse	Succeeded by Mark Hatfield
