= List of canneries =

This is a list of canneries. A cannery is involved in the processes of canning, a method of preserving food in which the food contents are processed and sealed in an airtight container.

== Canneries ==
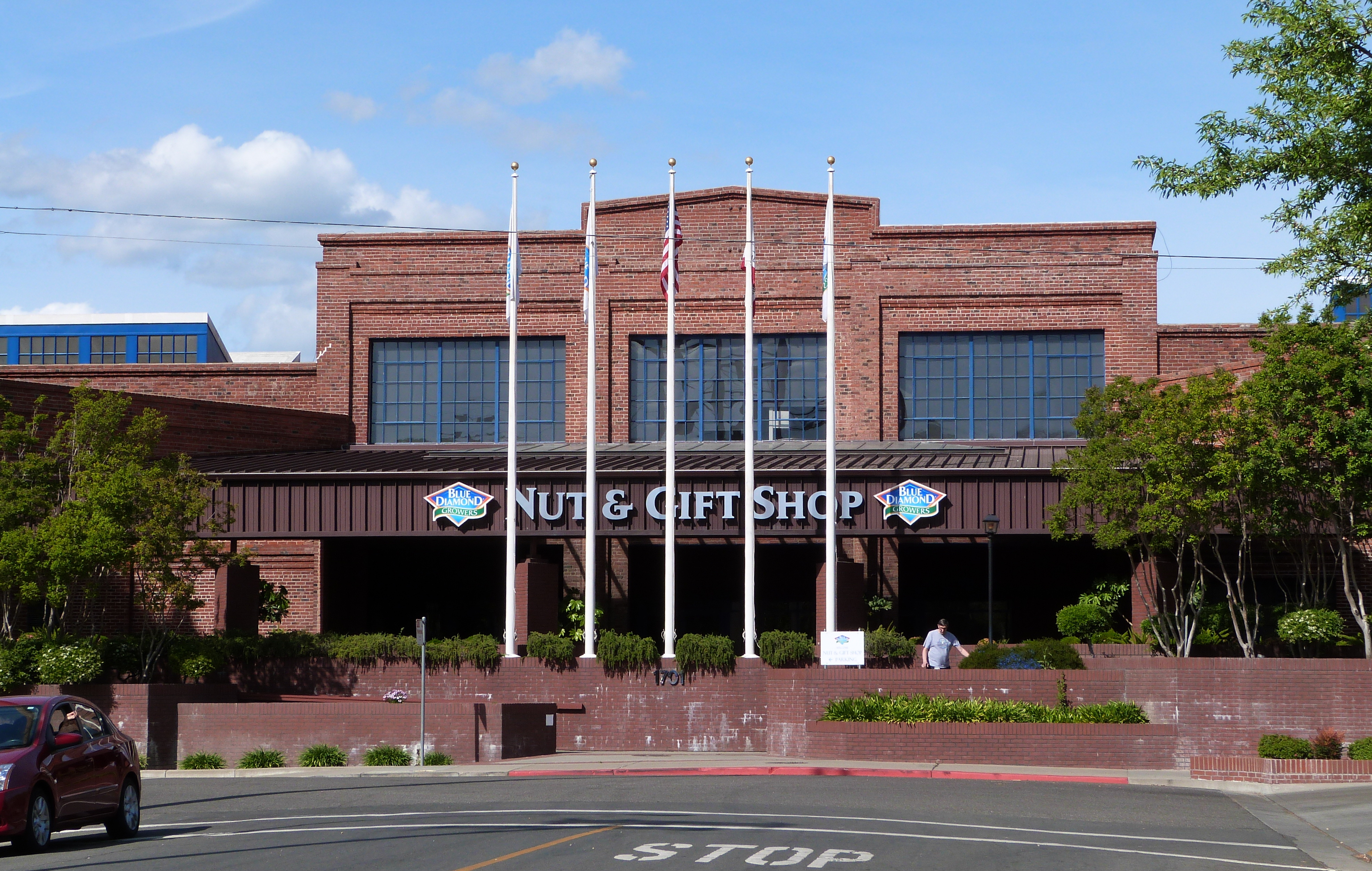
Calpak Plant No. 11 in 2015

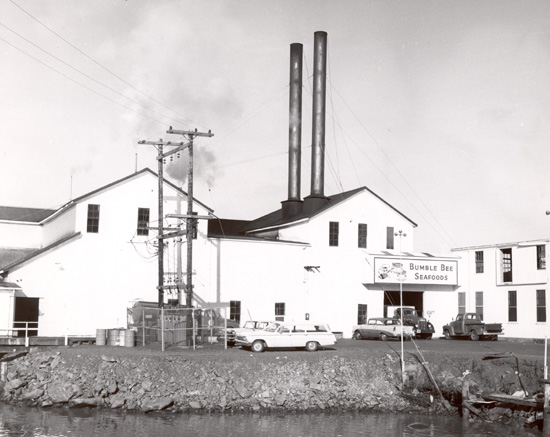
The Samuel Elmore Cannery while it was in operation, with a "Bumble Bee" sign hanging above the door

=== United States ===
- Bush Brothers Cannery - Chestnut Hill, Tennessee
- Calpak Plant No. 11 – located in Sacramento, California, it was constructed as a fruit cannery, and is used by Blue Diamond Almonds
- Edgett-Burnham Canning Company - former cannery in Camden, New York
- Empson Cannery, Longmont, Colorado, NRHP-listed
- Hovden Cannery - Monterey, California
- Kake Cannery - Kake, Alaska, listed on the National Register of Historic Places (NRHP)
- Kirkland Cannery Building - former cannery in Kirkland, Washington
- Kukak Bay Cannery - former cannery in Alaska
- Libby, McNeill and Libby Cannery - former cannery in Sacramento, California, NRHP-listed
- Libby, McNeill and Libby Building - former cannery and processing plant in Blue Island, Illinois
- Marshall J. Kinney Cannery - former cannery in Astoria, Oregon
- Samuel Elmore Cannery – was a U.S. National Historic Landmark in Astoria, Oregon that was designated in 1966 but was delisted in 1993. It was the home of "Bumble Bee" brand tuna.
- Thomas and Company Cannery, Gaithersburg, Maryland, NRHP-listed
- Thompson Fish House, Turtle Cannery and Kraals, Key West, Florida, NRHP-listed
- Wards Cove Packing Company - former cannery in Ketchikan, Alaska
- W.R. Roach Cannery - former cannery in Crosswell, Michigan, NRHP-listed

=== By type ===
- List of salmon canneries and communities

== See also ==
- Canned fish
- Canned water
- Food industry
- Salmon cannery
