= List of salmon canneries and communities =

This article contains lists of notable salmon canneries, cannery companies, cannery owners and salmon canning settlements

Canneries
- Chetlo Harbor Packing Company, Chetlo Harbor, Washington (operated from 1912 to 1915, canning 10,000 cases of Salmon)
- Gulf of Georgia Cannery, Steveston, British Columbia (re-opened in 1994 as a fishing and canning museum)
- Kake Cannery, Alaska
- Kukak Cannery Archeological Historic District, Katmai National Park and Preserve, Alaska
- North Alaska Salmon Company
- North Pacific Cannery, Prince Rupert, British Columbia – oldest extant West Coast salmon cannery (1889), National Historic Site
- Pacific Coast Salmon Cannery, Broderick, California, former National Historic Landmark
- Samuel Elmore Cannery, Oregon (1898, decommissioned 1980, burned 1993)
- Waterfall Cannery, Waterfall, Alaska (1912, operated until 1970, converted to Waterfall Resort 1973)

Cannery companies
- Alaska Packers' Association
- Bumble Bee Foods
- Chugach Alaska Corporation
- Fidalgo Island Packing Company
- J.G. Megler Co.
- John West Foods, founded in the nineteenth century by Captain John West
- King Oscar
- Libby, McNeill & Libby
- Pacific Steam Whaling Company

Cannery owners
- Robert Cunningham (1837–1905), pioneer and cannery founder
- Crescent Porter Hale (1872–1937), cannery and fisheries owner
- Robert Deniston Hume (1845–1908), cannery owner
- J. G. Megler (1838–1915), cannery owner and state legislator
- Henry O'Leary (1832–1897), cannery founder
- Frank M. Warren Sr. (1848–1912), cannery owner
- John West (1809–1888), cannery owner

Settlements

(Sorted alphabetically by state or province.)

- Aleutians East Borough, Alaska
- Akhiok, Alaska
- Baranof Island, Alaska
- Bristol Bay, Alaska
- Excursion Inlet, Alaska
- Dillingham, Alaska
- King Cove, Alaska
- Klawock, Alaska
- Kodiak Island, including the city of Kodiak, Alaska
- Naknek, Alaska
- Nushagak, Alaska
- Orca Inlet, Alaska
- Pelican, Alaska
- Port Wakefield, Alaska
- Quinhagak, Alaska
- Raspberry Island, Alaska
- Snettisham, Alaska
- Togiak, Alaska, see also Togiak River
- Ugashik, Alaska
- Waterfall, Alaska
- Yakutat City and Borough, Alaska
- Butedale, British Columbia
- Namu, British Columbia
- Prince Rupert, British Columbia
- Steveston, British Columbia
- Tallheo, British Columbia
- Wales Island, British Columbia
- Narooma, New South Wales
- Astoria, Oregon
- Clifton, Oregon
- Kernville, Oregon
- Warrendale, Oregon
- Warrenton, Oregon
- Wedderburn, Oregon
- Westport, Oregon
- Port-Menier, Quebec, founded by chocolatier and cannery owner Henri Menier (1853–1913)
- Bellingham, Washington
- Blaine, Washington The world's largest salmon cannery was operated by the Alaska Packer's Association for decades in Blaine.
- Brookfield, Washington
- Chetlo Harbor, Washington
- Clallam Bay, Washington
- McGowan, Washington
- Moclips, Washington

== See also ==
- List of canneries
- List of canneries in British Columbia
