= Mary Strong Kinney =

American politician

Mary Strong Kinney (April 9, 1859 – June 17, 1938) was an American politician from Oregon.

== Early life and education ==
Mary Edna Strong was born on April 9, 1859, in Salem, Oregon, to Elisha Strong and Pherne Brown Strong. Her great grandmother was Tabitha Moffatt Brown, the founder of what was to become Pacific University. She received her A.B. degree from Willamette University, as well as her A.M. degree in 1878. She taught at the La Creole Academy in Dallas. She married William Sylvester Kinney, the youngest son of Robert Crouch Kinney, in 1881. After her husband died in 1898, she managed his sawmill and raised four sons: Robert C., Dr. Alfred E., Dr. Kenneth W., William S.

== Political career ==
In 1912, the year women in Oregon were granted suffrage, Kinney was the president of the Astoria Women's Suffrage Club. Kinney was elected as a Republican to represent Clatsop County in the Oregon House of Representatives in 1920, serving in the 1921 legislature as the only woman in either house that year. She fought for the right for women to serve on Oregon juries. In 1922, she was elected to the state senate, where she served in the 1923 and 1925 legislative sessions. Oregon Voter magazine noted in 1922 that "her business experience was so broad that she had a ready comprehension of legislative problems" and that she "bore herself with distinction and dignity".

== Death and legacy ==
Strong moved to Astoria in 1908. She died in Seaside, Oregon, on June 17, 1938, and was buried in the Salem Pioneer Cemetery. A liberty ship, the SS Mary E. Kinney was built in Portland and named in her honor on December 29, 1943.

== See also ==
- The Marshall J. Kinney Cannery was reportedly run by her brother-in-law.
