= Marshall J. Kinney Cannery =

Coordinates: 46.19147°N 123.83664°W

- Formerly listed on the U.S. National Register of Historic Places
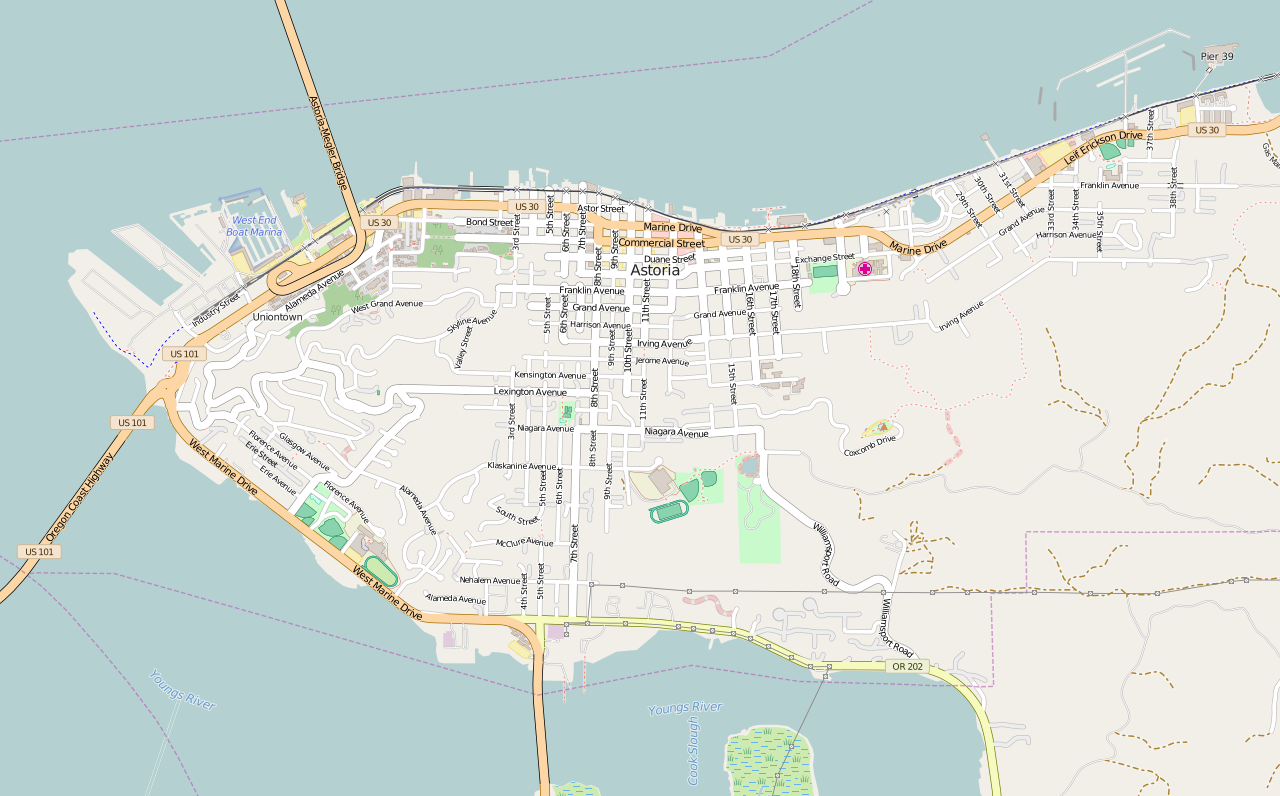
- Location within Astoria OR
- Location: 1 Sixth Street; Astoria, Oregon
- Area: 1.1 acres (0.45 ha)
- Built: 1879
- Architectural style: Post and truss industrial
- NRHP reference No.: 89000515

Significant dates
- Added to NRHP: June 30, 1989
- Removed from NRHP: September 8, 1997

The Marshall J. Kinney Cannery, located in Uniontown, Astoria, Oregon, United States, between Fifth and Seventh streets, was constructed in 1879 and became one of the city's longest-running salmon canneries. Run by the Astoria Packing Company, of which Marshall J. Kinney was president, the complex quickly became the "largest and most extensive salmon-packing establishment on the Pacific Coast". In 1894, the cannery was completely rebuilt after being burned to the ground. Five years later Kinney became part of the Columbia River Packers Association, joining several other canneries and packing companies. By 1904, the complex supported three production lines; Kinney continued cannery operations until the 1920s when it was primarily used as a central machine shop and warehouse for the Columbia River Packers Association. In 1954, a cargo ship ran into the complex, part of which was lost. Intact portions were used for storage until 1980 and today house shops and small businesses. The cannery was added to the National Register of Historic Places on June 30, 1989, but was delisted on September 8, 1997.

== History ==
Kinney Cannery, located in Uniontown between Fifth and Seventh streets, was constructed in 1879. The cannery was run by the Astoria Packing Company, of which Marshall J. Kinney, son of Robert C. Kinney, was president. During 1881 the complex, then referred to as the "largest and most extensive salmon-packing establishment on the Pacific Coast", reportedly packed 26,000 cases of salmon. According to the Chief of Engineers of the United States Army, as printed in the Annual Report of the Secretary of War (1890), the cannery packed 7,500 cases of salmon worth nearly $40,000 during the season of 1887. In 1894, the complex burned to the ground and was completely rebuilt. In 1899, the cannery became part of the Columbia River Packers Association, joining the Samuel Elmore Cannery, Fisherman's Packing Co., J.O. Hanthorn & Co., J.W. Seaborg and Scandinavian Packing Co., among others. Kinney buildings at the river end were used for warehouse space; the older ones along the shore continued cannery operations.

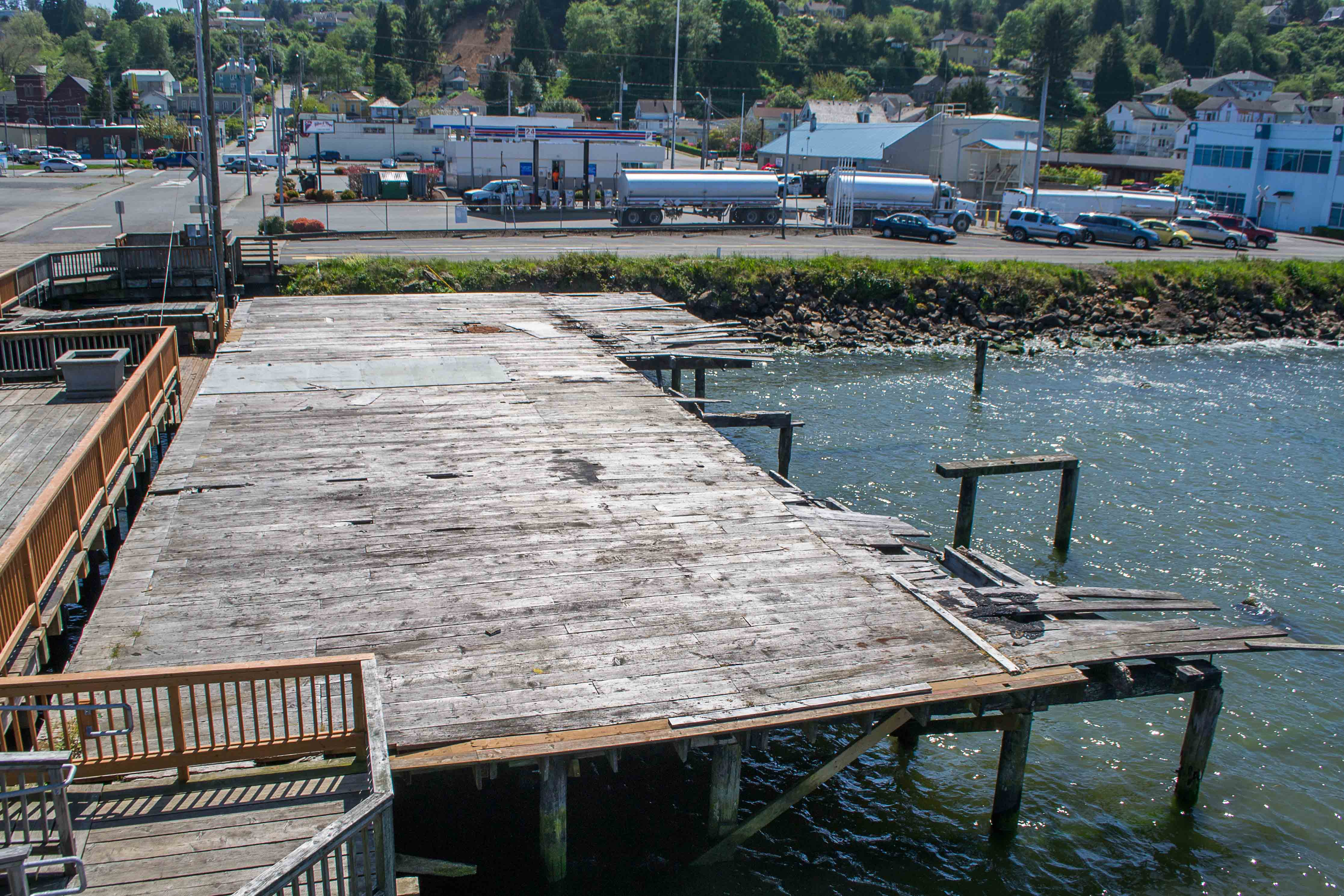
The former location of the cannery

By 1904, the Kinney complex supported three production lines. It was divided into two sections separated by a "planked extension" of Sixth Street. On the west side stood a 200' x 170' wood frame warehouse which, after 1910, housed the machine shop and stored cannery equipment, cans and labels, and marine engines. This section later housed offices for Alaskan production. On the east side of Sixth Street stood an 80' x 150' "two-story, semi-mill constructed" can factory building. The complex continued cannery operations until the 1920s when it was primarily used as a central machine shop and warehouse for the Columbia River Packers Association.

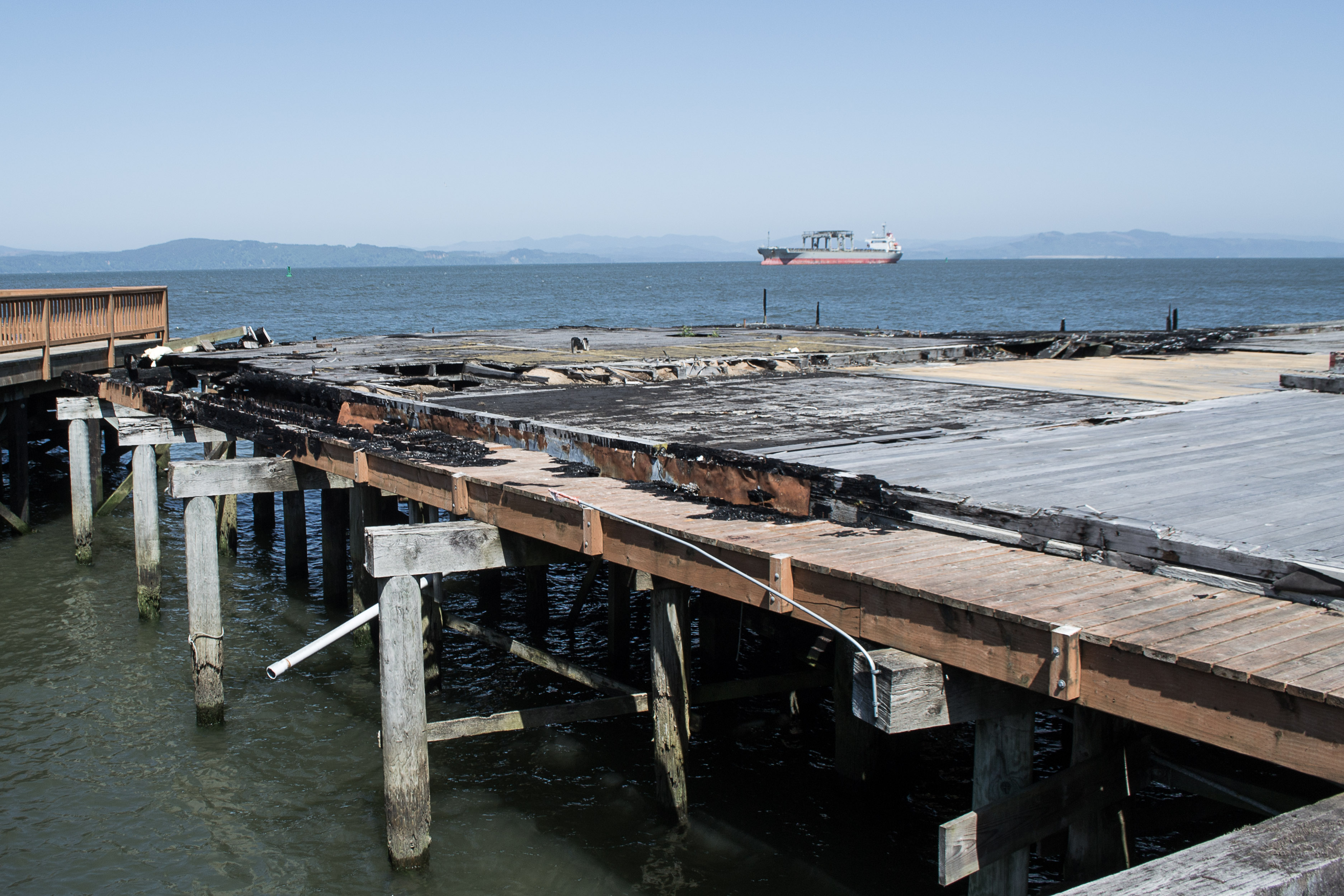
Nothing remains of Gunderson's Cannery Cafe after a 2010 fire

By the 1940s, the Kinney complex had expanded "significantly". In 1954, an outbound cargo ship carrying 8,000 tons of grain ran into the complex, part of which was lost. Remaining buildings were used for storage until 1980 and have since been converted to shops. Part of the complex was restored and a lookout was built on its wharf to encourage business; however, other parts of the Kinney complex remained in ruins. The cannery was added to the National Register of Historic Places on June 30, 1989. However, the complex was delisted from the Register on September 8, 1997. It housed Gunderson's Cannery Café and other small businesses until a fire destroyed the buildings in December 2010. Discussions of condominium development have taken place, including Riverpark Suites for the "ruined half" of the complex.

== See also ==
- Cannery Row, located in Monterey, California
- List of canneries
  - List of salmon canneries and communities
- National Register of Historic Places listings in Clatsop County, Oregon
- Union Fishermen's Cooperative Packing Company Alderbrook Station
