= Libby, McNeill and Libby Cannery =

- Libby McNeill and Libby Fruit and Vegetable Cannery
- U.S. National Register of Historic Places
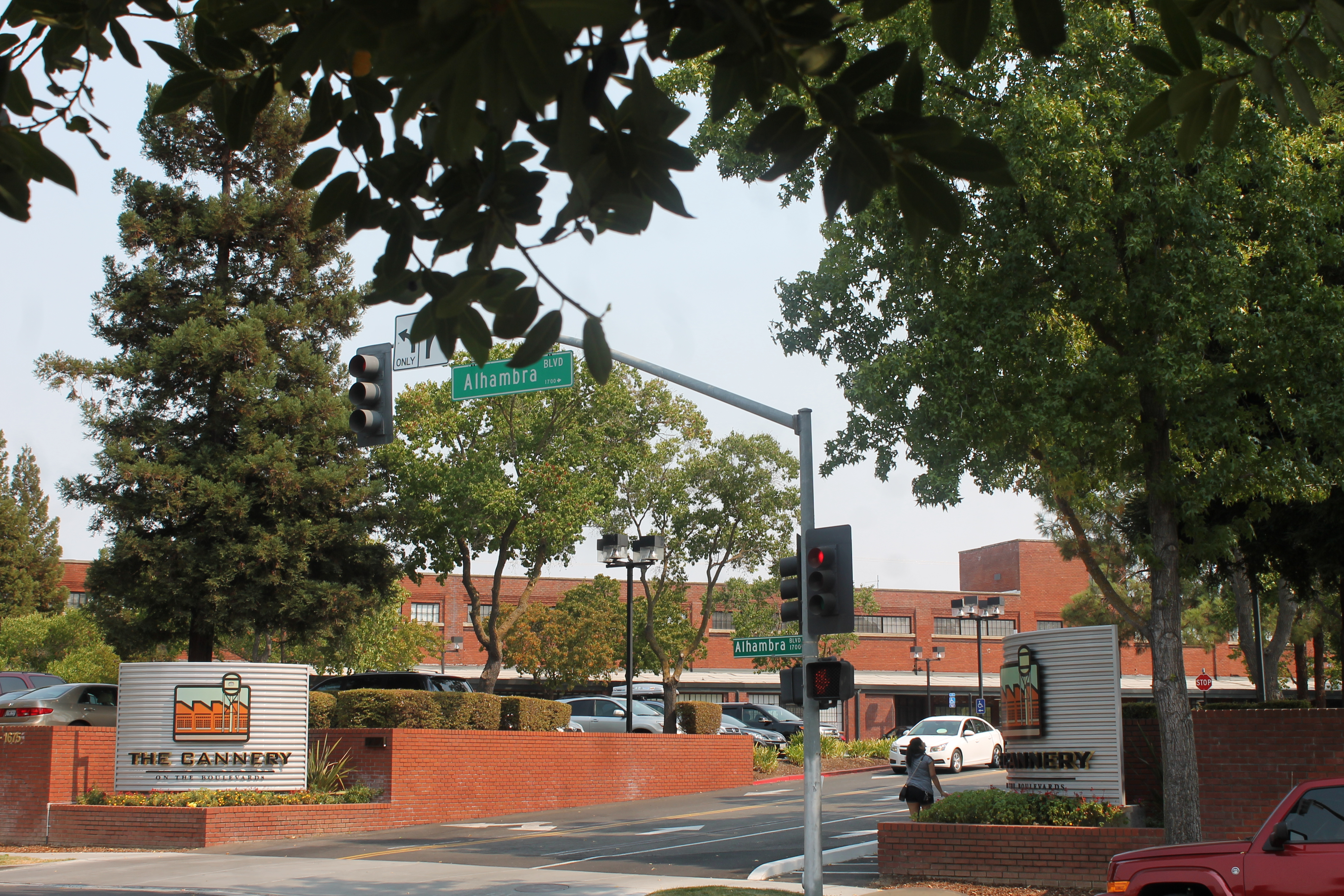
- Entrance to the complex

- Location within Sacramento, California Location within California Location within the United States
- Location: 1724 Stockton Blvd., Sacramento, California
- Coordinates: 38°33′52″N 121°27′59″W
- Area: 8.9 acres (3.6 ha)
- Built: 1918
- Architect: A.C. Rhoads, Washington J. Miller, others
- NRHP reference No.: 82002235
- Added to NRHP: March 2, 1982

The Libby, McNeill and Libby Fruit and Vegetable Cannery was a cannery in Sacramento, California operated by Libby, McNeill, and Libby. The building is now listed on the National Register of Historic Places.

Libby, McNeill and Libby built nine brick structures near the corner of Stockton Boulevard and 31st Street (now Alhambra Boulevard) in 1912. The undertaking totaled a cost of $1 million.

The building was strategically located to provide access to two separate railways. It employed around 1,000 workers.

Corresponding with a decline in canned food sales in the US, Libby shut down the cannery's operations in the early 1980s. A developer purchased the building soon after for $2.5 million and remodeled it into an office complex used by state offices, departments of UC Davis Medical Center, and a fitness center. In 1991, it was valued at $30 million. In 2021, The Sacramento Bee moved its editorial offices into the development after seven decades at its headquarters and printing plant at 21st and Q Streets.

== See also ==
- History of Sacramento Cannery Industry
- List of canneries
