= Augustus C. Kinney =

American physician

Augustus Crouch Kinney
- Born: July 26, 1845; Muscatine, Iowa
- Died: March 24, 1908 (aged 62); Oakland, California
- Resting place: Salem, Oregon; 44°55.171′N 123°02.898′W
- Education: Willamette University College of Medicine; Pacific University
- Occupation: Physician

Augustus Crouch Kinney (July 26, 1845 - March 24, 1908) was an American physician and scientist in the state of Oregon. A native of Iowa, his family moved to Oregon Country when he was an infant where he was raised and started his medical career. He practiced the majority of his career in Astoria, Oregon, and was a leading expert on tuberculosis.

== Early life ==
Augustus Kinney was born on July 26, 1845, to Robert and Eliza Lee (née Bigelow) Kinney in Muscatine, Iowa. Two years later he traveled the Oregon Trail with his family in a wagon train that included Joel Palmer and his family. Kinney's family settled in the Chehalem Valley of what is now Yamhill County, Oregon, where his father grew an orchard. His father also was a member of the Oregon Constitutional Convention and territorial legislator. Augustus earned his education at Pacific University in Forest Grove, and at McMinnville College (now Linfield College) in McMinnville, before entering medical school.

In 1866, he married Jane Welch, and the marriage did not produce any children. He started his medical training at Willamette University College of Medicine in Salem where he graduated in 1869, and the next year he graduated from Bellevue Hospital Medical College (now New York University School of Medicine) in New York City. Kinney was one of eleven children in the family, with eight living to adulthood, including his younger brother Alfred who also graduated from medical school.

== Career ==
In 1871, Kinney began a medical practice in Portland, Oregon, where his brother joined him. He left Portland in 1873 for California, where he remained until 1875 when he returned to Oregon. Kinney set up practice in Astoria where he remained until his death. His treatments for tuberculosis received notoriety from around the world and was considered a leading expert on the disease in the United States. Kinney was also a frequent contributor to medical journals.

== Later life ==
Kinney did some scientific work in addition to his medical work. This included studying the Nehalem Beeswax along the Oregon Coast, which Kinney believed was ozocerite. He also donated a collection of fish from Astoria to the Smithsonian Institution in 1888. Augustus Kinney died on March 24, 1908, at the age of 62 at the Fabiola Hospital in Oakland, California, of cancer and was buried at the IOOF Cemetery (now Salem Pioneer Cemetery) in Salem. His nephew Augustus, from his brother Alfred, also was a doctor who studied tuberculosis.
