= Calpak Plant No. 11 =

- U.S. National Register of Historic Places
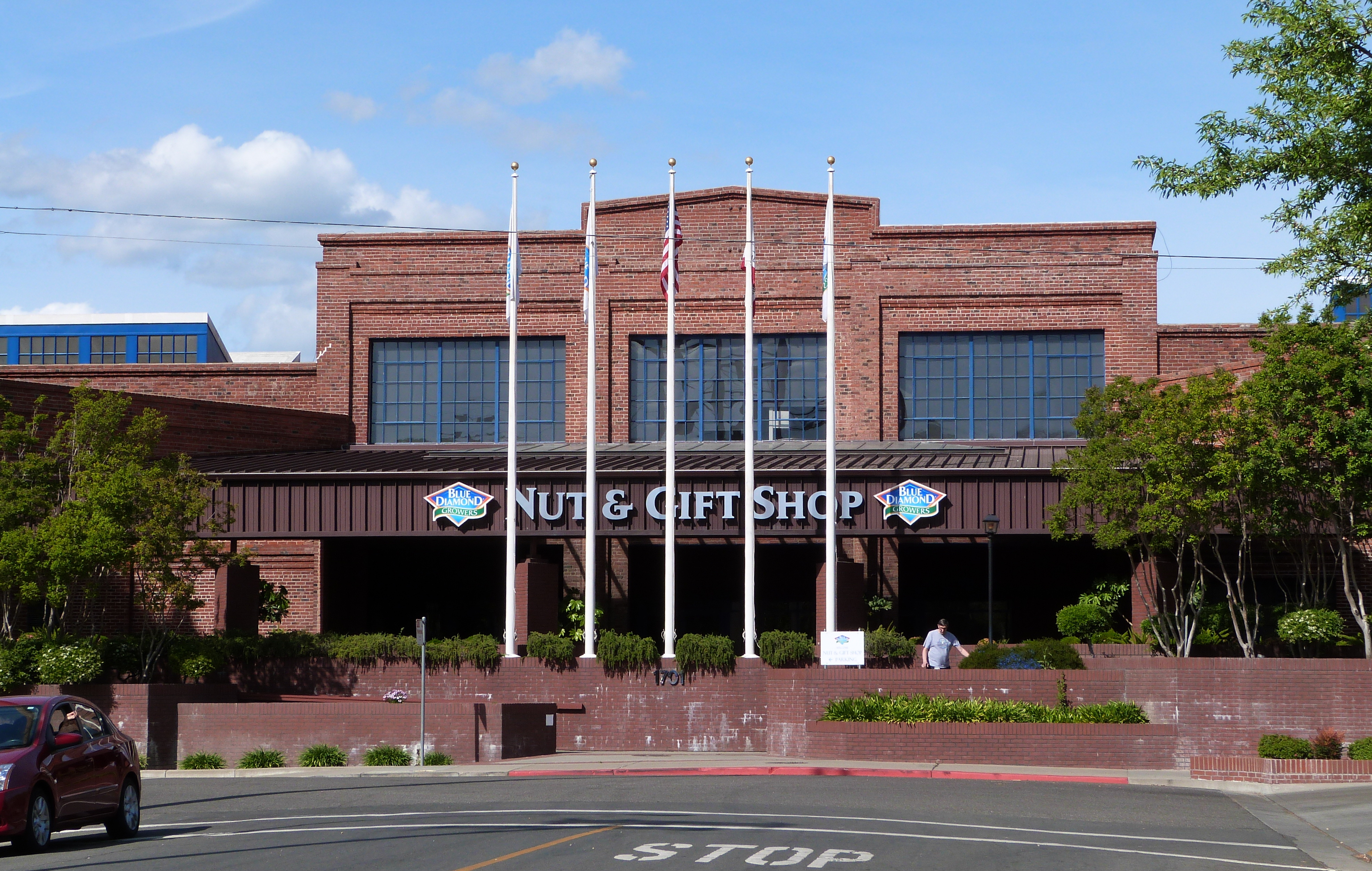
- Calpak Plant No. 11 in 2015, showing the non-historic canopy addition at the main entry

- Location within Sacramento, California Location within California Location within the United States
- Location: 1721 C Street; Sacramento, California
- Coordinates: 38°35′09″N 121°28′49″W
- Area: 5.6 acres (2.3 ha)
- Built: 1925
- Architect: Philip Bush
- NRHP reference No.: 84000939
- Added to NRHP: May 17, 1984

The Calpak Plant No. 11 in Sacramento, California, is a building built in 1925. Calpak (later renamed "Del Monte Foods") constructed the building as a fruit cannery but it is now used by Blue Diamond Almonds It was listed on the National Register of Historic Places in 1984.

== History ==
The plant was designed by Calpak's Engineering Department Chief, Philip Bush. When it was built, it was one of the largest fruit canneries in the world. The plant contained 250,000 square feet and had a 100,000 square foot warehouse area. At its peak, the plant employed 2,500 workers, who were mostly women. By the time Plant No. 11 had opened, Calpak had also become the largest packing and canning company in the world. The plant packed peaches, pears, tomatoes, pumpkin, squash, spinach, carrots and beets.

Calpak had four Del Monte canneries located in Sacramento and only Calpak Plant No. 11 survives. Blue Diamond Growers purchased the plant from the California Packing Company in 1982.

== See also ==
- History of Sacramento Cannery Industry
- List of canneries
