= California Almond Growers =

Historical Landmark in Sacramento, United States

California Almond Growers Exchange
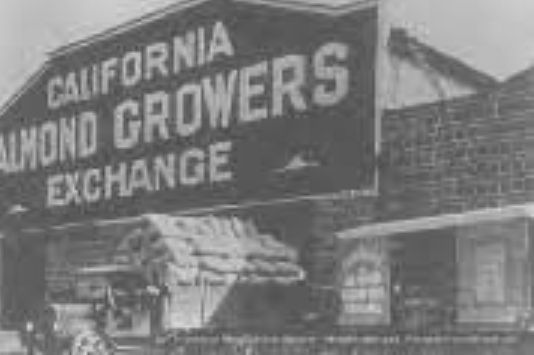
- California Almond Growers Exchange

- Location within California Location within the United States
- 38.5851°N 121.47°W
- Location: 1809 C Street, Sacramento, California

History
- Founded: 1910
- Founder: Rev. J. P. Dargitz
- Built: 1915

Site notes
- Area: 90 acres (36 ha), 33 city blocks
- Governing body: In 1980 name changed to Blue Diamond Growers

California Historical Landmark
- Reference no.: 967

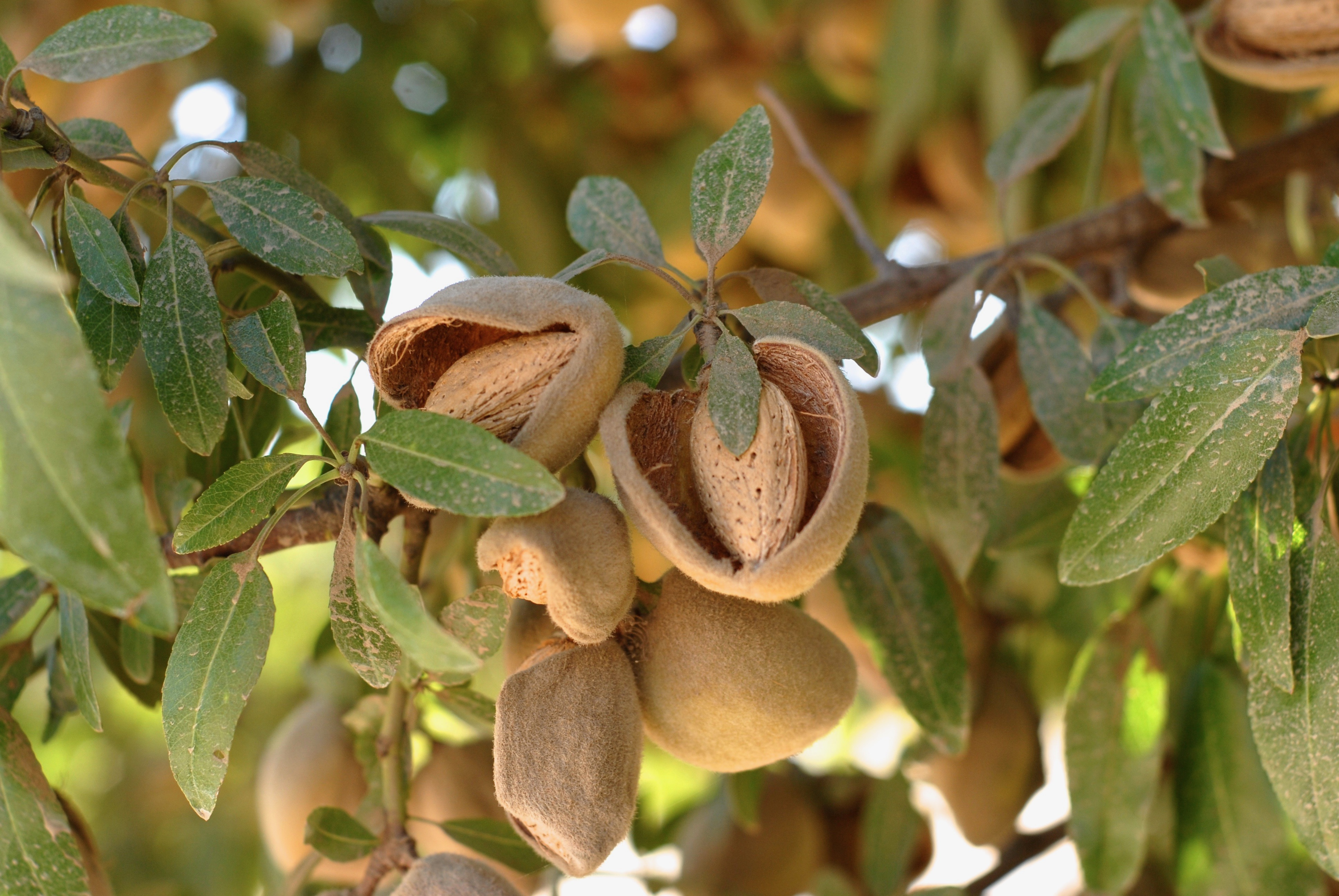
Almonds maturing on a tree

California Almond Growers Exchange (CAGE) is a historical building in Sacramento, California, built in 1915. The first successful almond farmer owned cooperative was the California Almond Growers Exchange founded in 1910. The California Almond Growers Exchange working as group improved almond production and marketing. The Exchange helped develop machines processing almonds, reducing cost and time to market. California Almond Growers Exchange built a new mechanical cracker for shelling almonds. California Almond Growers Exchange building is California Historical Landmark No. 967, registered on October 1, 1985. The California Almond Growers Exchange building is at 1809 C Street in Sacramento. The California Almond Growers Exchange became the Blue Diamond Growers in 1980, the cooperative is privately held. Before the California Almond Growers Exchange, the almond market was chaotic and sometimes unprofitable. Pooling together helped all growers. The cooperative was the idea of J. P. Dargitz, an almond grower from Acampo. He founded the California Almond Growers Exchange on May 6, 1910, as a statewide group. Nine local cooperatives, representing 60 percent of almond production going to market, joined to make the California Almond Growers Exchange. One of California Almond Growers' first standard products was sold in 1912, Four pounds of packaged unshelled almonds called Blue Diamond Almonds, the product was sold in stores across the United States. In 1922, the California Almond Growers Exchange started a publication called The Minute Book to keep the grower informed on the cooperative's operation and activities as sales grew. At its peak, in 1931, four thousand almond growers were part of the Exchange. The first local Almond Growers Association cooperative was in 1897, the Davisville Almond Growers Association. In 1962, the California Almond Growers Exchange built a three-story cold storage warehouse so sales would not need to be seasonal. Also in 1962, the California Almond Growers Exchange built a processing warehouse that could refrigerate 4,000 tons of shelled almonds. In 2013 a new plant in Turlock, California was opened by Blue Diamond, in addition to the Sacramento plant.

== See also ==
- Almond cultivation in California
- California Historical Landmarks in Sacramento County
