= Edgett-Burnham Canning Company =

- Type: Corporation
- Industry: Cannery
- Founded: 1863
- Defunct: 1973
- Fate: sold
- Headquarters: Newark, New York

Edgett-Burnham Canning Company, was founded in 1863 as the Wayne County Preserving Co. by Ezra Edgett of Camden, New York. The company was located all during its history, in Wayne County, New York.

== History ==
All local produce and crops were grown at first on the factory farm, or purchased from area farmers. Featured were fruits, vegetables, and—it is said—even canned turkey and geese for Union troops during the American Civil War. The factory was located on the western side of the village of Newark and employed many seasonal workers. Entire families found work at the "factory" during the canning season and some worked full-time, as labeling and can making was done off season.

In 1889 Ezra Edgett died and E.K. Burnham, a local attorney joined the firm, helping Edgett's widow Harriett Edgett run the company. In 1908, the firm was incorporated as the Edgett-Burnham Company and E.K. Burnham's son had joined the firm. In 1889 Mary Flynn Miller was hired to be the first superintendent and in 1911 was succeeded by her nephew F. Eugene Flynn who had worked for the firm at age 12. Mr. Flynn served as Supt. and Vice President until he retired in 1949 with 60 years of service.

Edgett-Burnham was located first on the Erie Canal and the Barge Canal. Both waterways served the firm as avenues for shipping and receiving as did the West Shore Railroad that followed along the Erie Canal through Newark. Business was prosperous through World War I and World War II, and into the early 1950s.

The company produced canned goods under the following labels:

- Faultless
- Wayne
- Winsom
- West Shore
- Burnham
- Newark

By the middle 1950s only contract canning was done, packing corn, peas, beans and beets for large supermarkets and putting the customer's labels on the product. By the 1960s, any company doing business on or using the canal for dumping of process water, found that times were changing. Regulations by New York State would require the building of expensive pre-treatment facilities. Edgett-Burnham Co. was sold to Perfection Foods who operated the firm until 1973. The entire parcel and buildings then passed to Rodney Graybill who developed the property, selling off parcels for a McDonald's, and other stores and developed the plant into Cannery Row Plaza.

== See also ==
- Canning
- List of canneries
