= History of the Sacramento cannery industry =

Sacramento, California, United States, has been an important location in the history of canning thanks to its situation on the intersection of major transportation routes and proximity to large fertile growing areas. Sacramento’s canning industry has prepared a large variety of agricultural products but is best known for canned tomatoes, earning Sacramento the nickname "The Big Tomato."

== Salmon Packing ==
During the Gold Rush era, agriculture was not well established in California, with most food being imported from overseas. Canning in Sacramento began with salmon, which was abundant in the Sacramento and American Rivers. In 1864, the first industrial-scale salmon cannery in North America was established by the Hapgood-Hume Company on a barge in the Sacramento River near West Sacramento. The salmon were packed in salt water (later the salt was replaced with a pickle) and the cans were then boiled for about one hour. Packing companies built twenty salmon canneries over the next two decades, reaching peak production in 1882 with 200,000 cases packed. The rise of production would coincide with a dramatic decline of salmon population around Sacramento due to overfishing and loss of habitat due to hydraulic mining, dredge mining, logging, and the construction of infrastructure. By 1886, packing companies had closed all their salmon canneries along the Sacramento River and relocated their plants north to Oregon, Washington, and Alaska.

== Fruit and Vegetable Canning ==
With the completion of the transcontinental railroad in 1869 providing access to a national market, Sacramento growers took advantage of the region’s ample water supply and favorable climate and expanded their operations into more profitable fruits and vegetables. At the time, exporters faced difficulty preserving fresh produce on railcars destined out of state, fostering an industry for canned produce. The nascent canning industry competed with the newly invented refrigerated railcar.

The Capitol Packing Company built the first successful fruit and vegetable cannery in Sacramento in 1882 on Front and K Streets. By 1886, the company employed 450 people and produced 100,000 cases per year.

The opening of the Panama Canal in 1914 dramatically increased demand for California canned goods and spurred further development of the industry in the Sacramento area. Numerous cannery operations were built in the Sacramento area around that time.

The success of the canning industry spurred the growth of secondary industries, including the mass production of tin cans. In 1901, the American Can Company was formed, incorporating 123 smaller can companies operating manufacturing plants across the United States. In 1926, the company built one of its largest factories in Sacramento on 33 acres between the American River and McKinley Park.

In 1947, the Campbell's opened the last major cannery in Sacramento, located on Franklin Boulevard. The plant was Campbell’s oldest facility when it closed in 2013.

== Libby, McNeill and Libby Cannery ==
In 1912, Libby, McNeill and Libby built one of the largest canneries in California, a nine-acre facility at 31st Street, R Street, and Stockton Boulevard. Strategically situated near a wagon road and the Southern Pacific and Sacramento Northern railroads, fresh produce arrived at the cannery generally by wagon or truck, and canned goods left in railroad boxcars. The cannery operations ended in the 1980s, and the complex was redeveloped into office spaces, named the Cannery. In 2021, The Sacramento Bee moved its editorial offices into the development. The building is listed on the National Register of Historic Places.

== California Packing Company ==
The California Packing Company, a combination of five West Coast canning companies, best known under the Del Monte brand, opened four canneries in Sacramento: at Front and P Streets, Third and X Streets, 19th and R Streets, and 17th and C Streets. The facility located at 17th and C Streets, known as Plant 11, employed at its peak 2,500 workers and continues in operation, now by the Blue Diamond Growers. Plant 11 is also listed on the National Register of Historic Places.

== Bercut-Richards Cannery ==
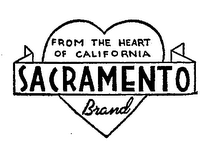
1946 Bercut-Richards Sacramento Brand trademark

Beginning in 1931, Peter and Henri Bercut and Thomas H. Richards, Sr. developed what became the largest independent cannery in California, located just south of the American River on North 7th Street. Bercut-Richards was one of the largest producers of tomato products, producing their own “Sacramento” brand.

During World War II, Sacramento residents grew victory gardens, and Bercut-Richards canned the produce with a special “V for Victory” label. In 1942, the U.S. Army Signal Corps took over operation of the Bercut-Richards cannery to supply the war effort. The Bercut-Richards facility housed German prisoners of war who worked in the depot’s warehouses. The Bercut-Richards cannery ceased operations in 1993. In 2009, the historic structure was demolished to build apartments and other developments.

== Cannery Labor ==
In the 1800s, white Pacific fisherman organized with cannery workers to exclude non-white workers.

After the first World War, the Industrial Workers of the World and the American Federation of Labor began organizing farm and food production workers throughout California. Between 1918 and 1920, a series of strikes affected cannery operations in Northern California. In 1920, workers at the Libby, McNeill & Libby cannery in Sacramento went on strike.

In Sacramento, the seasonal canning industry was the first industry affected by the Great Depression. In September 1930, the California Cooperative Producers Canning Company, the previous operator of Bercut-Richards cannery, laid off 153 cannery workers as demand for canned goods plummeted. The company would eventually owe over $25,000 to 600 workers who filed petitions to the State Labor Bureau who were ultimately unsuccessful in recouping their stolen wages. Following a December 1932 freeze, cannery officials began hiring desperate workers for as little as $0.20 an hour By 1930, the radical Cannery and Agricultural Workers' Industrial Union (CAWIU) was organizing Sacramento cannery workers.

In 1934, pressured by the Associated Farmers of California and its allied urban commercial and industrial interests, police raided the CAWIU headquarters in Sacramento and charged 17 of its leaders with criminal syndicalism. Several leaders, including Pat Chambers and Caroline Decker, were sentenced in 1935 to several years’ imprisonment. After 1935, Sacramento cannery workers organized under the AFL as Cannery Workers Local No. 20324.

In 1945, AFL President William Green turned over jurisdiction of all California cannery locals to the International Brotherhood of Teamsters. Cannery workers in Sacramento, Stockton, and Modesto were not consulted beforehand and lacked trust in the Teamsters, staging strikes and work stoppages in protest of the decision. About 1,200 workers in the Sacramento Libby, McNeill and Libby plant refused to pay dues to the Teamsters, striking with signs that read “We Will Work—But Not One Cent of Tribute to the Teamsters." The Sacramento Police Department intervened, escorting scab replacements and checking for Teamster cards.

The second World War greatly increased demand for canned goods, but it also reduced the domestic supply of labor. Sacramento canneries benefited from the Bracero Program, which supplemented cheap migrant labor from Mexico. With the program, cannery work became increasingly racialized.

After the second World War, cannery operations became increasingly automated and less reliant on labor. Since then, demand for canned goods has steadily declined, resulting in further job losses.
