= Robert Crouch Kinney =

American politician

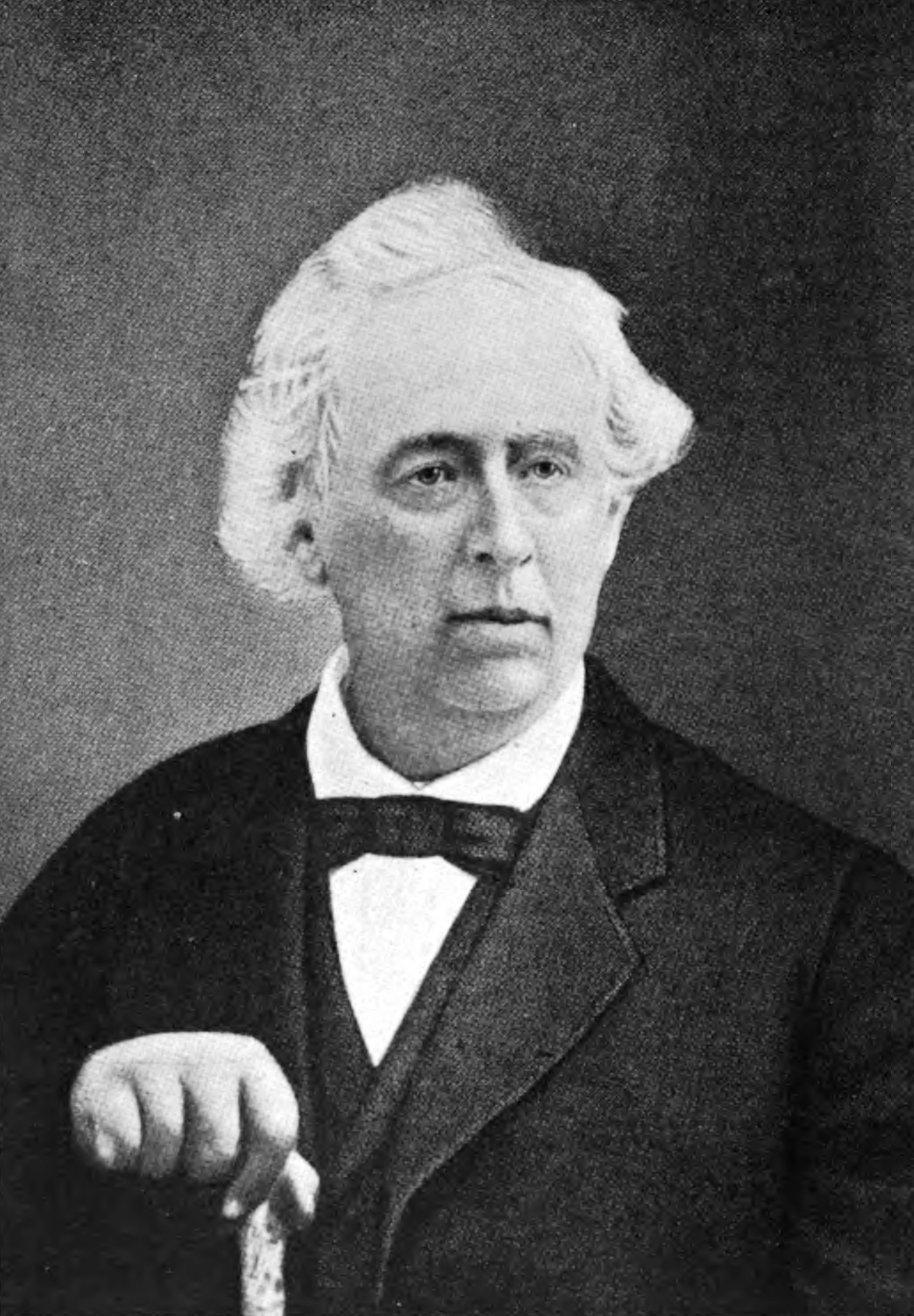

Delegate to the Oregon Constitutional Convention
- In office 1857
- Constituency: Yamhill County

Member of the Oregon Territorial Legislature
- In office 1849 and 1851
- Constituency: Yamhill County

Personal details
- Born: July 4, 1813 Belleville, Illinois
- Died: March 2, 1875 (aged 61) Salem, Oregon
- Resting place: Salem Pioneer Cemetery
- Party: Anti-Democrat
- Spouse: Eliza Bigelow Kinney

Robert Crouch Kinney (July 4, 1813 – March 2, 1875) was an American businessman and politician in what became the state of Oregon. A native of Illinois, he helped found Muscatine, Iowa, before crossing the Oregon Trail and settling in what became Oregon. In Oregon he was a prominent businessman in the milling business and served in the Oregon Territorial Legislature before being a member of the Oregon Constitutional Convention.

== Early life ==
Robert Kinney was born on July 4, 1813, in the town of Belleville in St. Clair County, Illinois, near St. Louis, Missouri. His parents were Samuel and Polly (née Gibbons) Kinney, both from Kentucky. Robert’s uncle was William Kinney, who served as Lieutenant Governor of Illinois from 1826 to 1830. Robert Kinney was raised in Illinois where he received an education in the common schools of Springfield.

In 1833, he married Eliza Bigelow, and the couple had eleven children, with eight living to adulthood. The eight children were Mary Jane, Albert William (married daughter of William T. Newby), Augustus Crouch, Marshall Johnson, Eliza Lee, Alfred Coleman, Josephine Elarena, and William Sylvester. The year they were married the couple moved to what became Iowa, where they helped found the town of Bloomington (now Muscatine) along the Mississippi River. Kinney built a hotel along with a wharf, and operated a boat from the town downriver to St. Louis. Later he entered the milling business, running a sawmill and flourmill, while also reading law under judge Serranus Clinton Hastings, though he never practiced law.

== Oregon ==
Kinney and his family, including brother Samuel, headed west overland on the Oregon Trail in 1847 in a wagon train that included Joel Palmer. He settled on a land claim in the Oregon Country in the Yamhill District near Lafayette. The next year the region became the Oregon Territory and in 1850 the Donation Land Act secured title for the settlers on their land claims. Kinney farmed his 640-acre (260 ha) land claim in the Chehalem Valley and raised orchards. Kinney left Oregon for the California Gold Rush in 1848, but returned the next year without having gained a large fortune.

After farming for ten years he moved to McMinnville in 1858 where he purchased the flour mill of town founder William Newby in 1859. Kinney expanded his business by buying the Brooklyn flour mill in Portland in 1862, followed by buying into the wool mill owned in part by Daniel Waldo in Salem in 1868. He moved the family to Salem and began running the flour mill part of the business, the Salem Milling Company. The company expanded and opened branch offices in San Francisco, Portland, and England, and at one time milled a quarter of all of the grain crops in the state. The company also was the first to ship flour from Portland to Liverpool in England, along with several other ports around the world.

== Political career ==
In 1849, Kinney was elected to represent Yamhill County in the first Territorial Legislature. After taking the 1850 session off, he returned in 1851 to again represent Yamhill County. In 1857, he was elected as a delegate for Yamhill County to the Oregon Constitutional Convention. Held in Salem in September and October, the convention creating the first Oregon Constitution and paved the way for Oregon’s entry into the Union. Kinney was a free stater and Anti-Democrat in philosophy, and he voted against the adoption of the constitution, though the convention did adopt the document and Oregon became a state in 1859.

== Later life ==
Some of Kinney’s sons became partners in the milling business, including Marshall as manager of the San Francisco office. Kinney also entered the livestock business and had an extensive ranch in Eastern Oregon near Heppner where he raised sheep. Robert Crouch Kinney died in Salem on March 2, 1875, at the age of 61 and was buried at the Salem Pioneer Cemetery.
