= Kake Cannery =

- U.S. National Register of Historic Places
- U.S. National Historic Landmark District
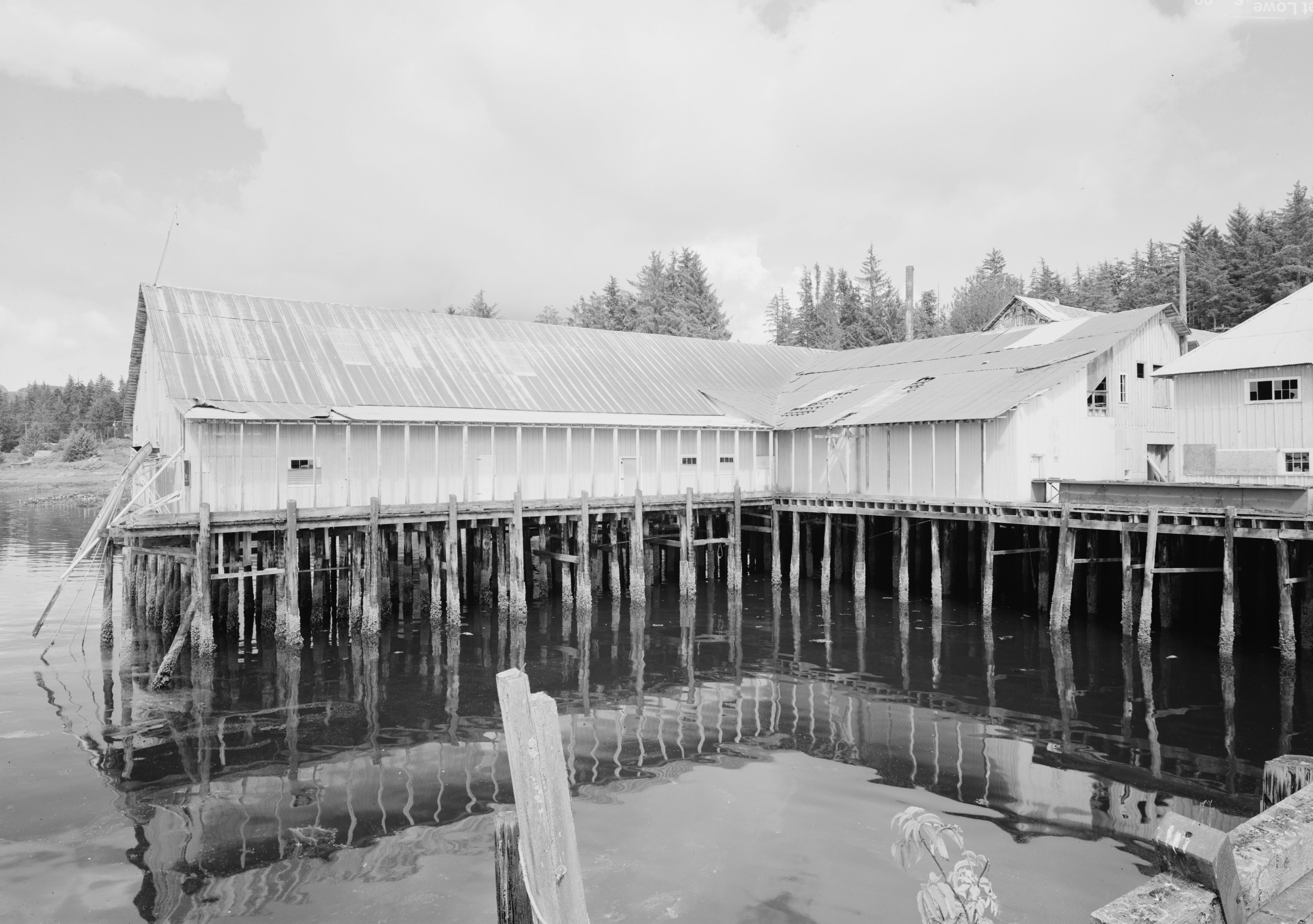
- Kake Salmon Cannery

- Location within Alaska
- Location: About 1 mile (1.6 km) southeast of Kake
- Nearest city: Kake, Alaska
- Coordinates: 56°57′53″N 133°55′32″W
- Area: 12 acres (4.9 ha)
- Built: 1912
- NRHP reference No.: 97001677

Significant dates
- Added to NRHP: December 9, 1997
- Designated NHLD: December 9, 1997

The Kake Cannery is a historic fish processing facility near Kake, Alaska. Operated by a variety of companies between 1912 and 1977, the cannery was one of many which operated in Southeast Alaska, an area historically rich in salmon. The cannery's surviving buildings are among the best-preserved of the period, and provide a window into the labor practices of the cannery operators, which emphasized production over working conditions, and made significant use of immigrant contract workers. It was declared a National Historic Landmark in 1997.

== Description and history ==
The Kake Cannery is located about 1 mile (1.6 km) southeast of the small community of Kake, Alaska, located on the northeastern coast of Kupreanof Island. It is about 90 miles (140 km) south of Juneau. The complex includes 18 buildings, out of an estimated 21 that were built by the cannery's owners and operators during its period of use. All of these buildings are mounted on wooden pilings, and are connected by boardwalks. Its main structures included four large buildings: the main cannery and three warehouses. Warehouse No. 1 housed the company offices and storage facilities, and housed a retail operation. Warehouse No. 2 housed facilities for storing and repairing nets, as well as storing canned fish. The cannery and these two warehouses were built around 1912. Warehouse No. 4 (there is no documented Warehouse No. 3) was built in the 1930s, and housed a mechanized can-forming operation.

The complex includes a variety of living quarters. There are two bunkhouses, one which was specifically designated for Japanese and Filipino workers, and another for whites. A third bunkhouse, for Chinese workers, has not survived. Six single-family dwellings also survive, one set aside for the supervisor, and another for the cook.

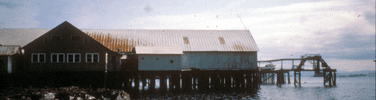
Kake cannery

The cannery was built in 1912 by the Sanborn Cutting Company. It was operated over the next several decades by Sunny Point Packing and the Alaska Pacific Salmon Packing Corporation, growing under the latter in the 1930s to become one of the largest fish packers in the region. During this time, the operators used generally race-based division of labor, assigning positions of responsibility to white men, and various lower-level menial tasks to immigrants from China, Japan, and the Philippines. Native Tlingit were employed to catch fish. Most of this labor was hired through contractor middlemen, who were responsible for housing and feeding the workers.

In 1940 the cannery was purchased by P. E. Harris & Company. The salmon fishery, however, was in decline, and the cannery was closed in 1946. It was sold in 1949 to a Native corporation, and operated as the Keku Cannery, but its packing operation was limited by the reduced fishery, and the eventual banning of the use of traps by the state Alaska after statehood. It was permanently closed in 1977.

== See also ==
- National Register of Historic Places listings in Prince of Wales-Hyder Census Area, Alaska
- List of canneries
- List of National Historic Landmarks in Alaska
