= Crescent Porter Hale =

American industrialist (1872–1937)

Crescent Porter Hale (1872–1937) was an American industrialist who was involved in the canned salmon industry in Bristol Bay, Alaska throughout his adult life.

== Early life ==
Born in Santa Cruz, CA as the 7th child of gold rush pioneer Titus Hale, the family moved to a farm on the lower Sacramento River in 1880. In 1885 Hale's sister Rose married a Sacramento cannery man, Joseph Peter Haller, who was hired to build the first cannery on Bristol Bay's Nushagak River earlier that year. Haller was then asked by William Bradford to build another cannery across the river and when he returned to Alaska in 1886, he brought along his 14-year-old brother in law Crescent.

Crescent Hale, also known as Cress or Cres, returned to the Nushagak, near present-day Dillingham, AK, in the summers that followed. At the Bradford cannery, he was schooled in the salmon canning trade. He was there in 1893 when all four Nushagak canneries merged with others to form the Alaska Packers Association (APA), a cannery cartel designed to control production and sell off surplus stockpiles of canned salmon.

At age 21, Cress was named superintendent of the Bradford cannery, later renamed the Diamond BB after the company name, the Bristol Bay Packing Co. Hale caught the eye of competitors and in 1899 the Pacific Steam Whaling Company hired 27-year-old Cress to build a salmon cannery at Nushagak Point and serve as its first superintendent.

== North Alaska Salmon Company ==
Then in 1900, Joseph Haller formed the North Alaska Salmon Company and returned to Bristol Bay with two of his brothers-in-law. Cress Hale was named general superintendent of Haller's company and Hale's brother William as bookkeeper.

Cress built two new canneries: one on the Kvichak River at a place named Hallerville and the other on the Egegik River across from the APA's Diamond E. Two years later, he expanded North Alaska's holdings again, building the Lockenok Cannery at the confluence of the Kvichak and Alagnak Rivers and then returned to the Nushagak to establish a cannery at Ekuk.

The North Alaska Salmon Co. emerged as the biggest competitor to the APA and in 1903 briefly took the lead in a technological race to mechanize the salmon canning process. Canning operations were mostly mechanized by the turn of the 20th century, except for cleaning the fish itself which was mostly done by Chinese workers. Haller and Hale formed the Canners Machine Co. and allied with the Letson Burpee Co. of Seattle and ran its fish cleaning machines at all of its canneries. Hale was awarded patent 798,334 for his improvements to the machine in 1905, but eventually the design of Edmund Augustine Smith, better known as the "Iron Chink," became the industry standard.

In 1906, Hale married Mabel Eugenie Jackson, a dance hall girl from Rochester, New York and three years later, they had their only child, Elwyn. 1909 also saw publication of the first novel written about Bristol Bay, The Silver Horde by Rex Beach, and Cress Hale was assumed to be its inspiration. It's doubtful that Hale and Beach ever met however and most of Beach's novels were formulaic potboilers not drawn from real life but Cress Hale fit the bill. The Silver Horde is the story of a young cannery superintendent who takes on the cannery trust dominated by Chicago meat packers. At the time, Hale was superintendent of a company second only to the giant APA but the similarities end there.

Real life concerns kept Hale busy. After mudflats blocked access to the Lockenok cannery in 1912, Hale staked a homestead claim on the Alagnak River to provide the cannery with riverfront access, even though it required a short rail line to get to the cannery. Likewise, the Hallerville cannery was plagued by mud flats. It closed in 1913 and Hale built another cannery on Kvichak Bay just above Pederson Point and moved the Hallerville equipment there.

The salmon industry prospered early in the 20th century and the outbreak of the First World War created huge demand for salmon that soon pushed Bristol Bay's annual harvest over 20 million reds. Joseph Haller, however, died of a heart ailment in 1915 and the North Alaska Salmon Co. was sold to Libby, McNeill and Libby, ironically a Chicago-based meat packing concern such as the antagonist in The Silver Horde. Hale's relocated Hallerville cannery was renamed Libbyville.

Cress Hale didn't sit idle for long. Praised in the trade journals as "one of the best all around, competent cannerymen in Western Alaska," Hale bought the Alaska Salmon Company cannery on Wood River near Dillingham in 1916. He organized under the name Northern Fisheries and in 1918 bought the Union Fish Company, a major cod-fishing concern with roots that traced back to the acquisition of Alaska from Russia. In 1923 he bought the Bristol Bay Packing Company cannery at Pederson Point near Naknek.

Hale recognized the potential of California sardines and bought the 420-foot Peralta in 1924 which he converted into a floating sardine reduction plant. The Peralta was an experimental ship with a hull built out of concrete due to a shortage of steel during the First World War.

The 1920s were generally strong years for Bristol Bay salmon and Hale helped introduce popular culture to the region by showing movies at his Wood River cannery. The films attracted hundreds, including cannery workers and local residents. Serials and westerns were popular as well as cartoons like Krazy Kat and Mickey Mouse.

Hale produced his own promotional movie, shot and edited by his Wood River cannery superintendent Joe Hidzik. Called Ice Kist Treasures after Hale's premier salmon brand, the film shows workers signing up, departing aboard cannery steamers, fishing boats, cannery operations and even a trip to the Wood Tikchik lakes. A copy of the film is available at the San Francisco Maritime Research Center located at San Francisco Maritime National Historical Park.

As the roaring 20s came to a close, Cress Hale was nearing age 60, and, after 40 years of canning salmon in Bristol Bay, he started thinking about retirement. Quietly, Hale began talking about selling out. He wanted $2.35 million and his timing seemed perfect. The industry was strong and markets healthy but events beyond his control soon ran against him: the stock market crash of 1929 and the forecast of a poor salmon return in 1930.

The APA took an interest in Hale's operation primarily for access to his fishing boats, which were limited under a federal quota program. When they offered just $1.4 million, Hale turned the offer down and struck a deal with to custom pack salmon for the A&P Tea Company, which also operated the Nakeen cannery on the Kvichak River.

== 1936 fire ==
The 1936 season was Cress Hale's 50th in Bristol Bay, and it started off with all indications of a strong run of salmon. By July 7, midway through the season, Hale had packed 40,000 cases, but, after he made his daily afternoon rounds through the Pederson Point cannery and settled into his office to deal with paperwork, all hell broke loose.

A fire started in a rear storage building and, whipped by strong winds, quickly spread through the wooden structure. The complex of buildings lacked any fire breaks, and, even worse, the heat buckled pipes that supplied the cannery with water. As fire hoses ran dry, the fire spread unchecked from one building to the next. No one was injured, but the loss of the cannery and its salmon pack was total. The cause of the fire was never determined. The facility was insured, but the insurance and legal issues involved were so complicated, the insurance industry wrote a book about it called The Bristol Bay Fire.

Hale returned to his home in Piedmont, California, started drawing up plans to rebuild. His new design divided the canning lines into two separate buildings with a substantial fire break in between. In late February, 1937, Hale wrote President Franklin D. Roosevelt warning about reports of Japanese plans to fish for Bristol Bay salmon. Within a few months, the issue erupted into a major diplomatic dispute between the U.S. and Japan but Hale did not live to see it.

On March 29, 1937, Hale died at age 65 of what was reported as thrombosis or blood clots. Mabel described his passing as, "A stanch ship sets sail for distant shores." The book about the Bristol Bay fire was just coming off the press and his insurance brokers inserted a card that dedicated it to Hale.

== The cannery after Hale's death ==
The rebuilding of the Pederson Point cannery took place as scheduled. Mabel visited both the Pederson Point and Wood River canneries in 1937 and erected bronze plaques as memorials to its fallen superintendent.

Northern Fisheries reorganized with longtime VP Charlie Cocks as president and Elwyn Hale as secretary and manager. Mabel also took an active role in the company. Hale's canneries ran for the next three years but financial problems forced both to close after the 1939 season. Mabel continued to court a buyer and finally in 1943, the two Bristol Bay canneries were sold to Alaska Pacific Salmon Company for $1.1 million. The newly rebuilt Pederson Point cannery soon reopened under new leadership but the Wood River cannery was shuttered and dismantled. The site sat vacant for 40 years until another processor took interest in the location for a freezer plant.

Mabel Eugenie Hale invested the earnings from her husband's fishing business in oil and potash leases and did quite well, amassing a small fortune that afforded her a comfortable home and a Rolls-Royce. She became a patron of the arts and education and in 1962 endowed a foundation which she named after her late husband. The Crescent Porter Hale Foundation continues to this day and awards grants to Catholic schools and arts and education programs in the San Francisco area.

Mabel outlived Elwyn, who never married and died in 1974 at age 65. Mabel Eugenie Hale lived to be 100. She died in 1982. Both the Peterson Point and Ekuk canneries remain operational today, but Hale's other canneries have long since been dismantled or destroyed. A freezer plant occupies the site of the Wood River cannery and was recently purchased by Snopac Products. The Peralta and other World War I-vintage concrete-hulled ships remain afloat as part of a floating breakwater around a timber plant in Powell River, British Columbia.
