= Thomas and Company Cannery =

- U.S. National Register of Historic Places
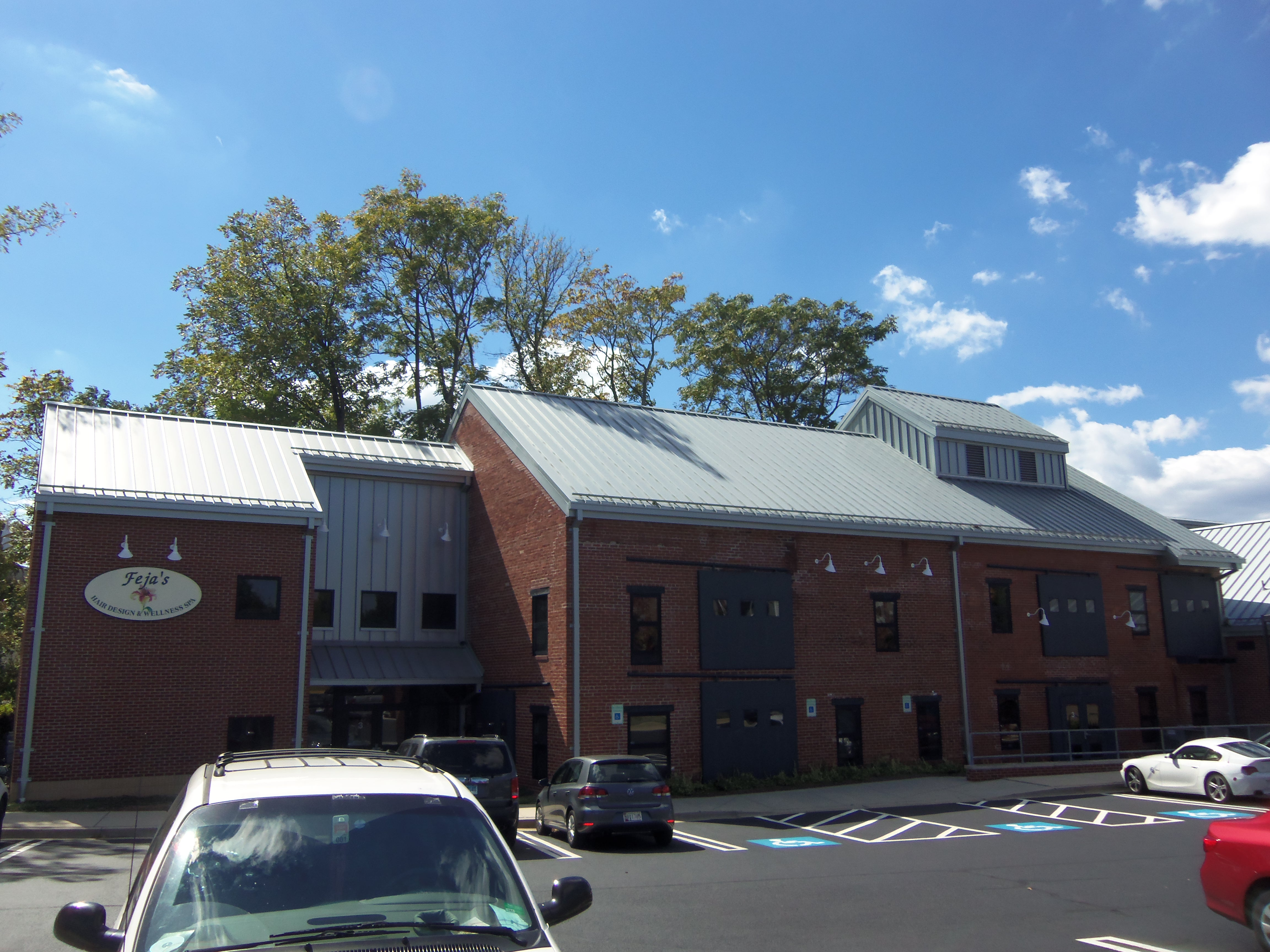
- Thomas and Company Cannery, September 2012

- Location within Maryland Location within the United States
- Location: Jct. of E. Diamond and N. Frederick Aves., Gaithersburg, Maryland
- Coordinates: 39°8′31.257″N 77°12′6.5268″W
- Area: 0.7 acres (0.28 ha)
- NRHP reference No.: 90001025
- Added to NRHP: July 5, 1990

The Thomas and Company Cannery is a historic building located at Gaithersburg, Montgomery County, Maryland. It is a one to two-story tall, free-standing, load-bearing brick rectangular structure composed of four discrete, structurally independent but contiguous elements, built between 1917 and 1918. An addition was constructed in 1956. It was the first and largest vegetable cannery in Montgomery County. The cannery was the primary employer in Gaithersburg, providing regular full and part-time employment for more than 200 people, and hundreds of additional jobs for migrant workers employed picking vegetables grown in the surrounding area. It closed in 1963, after fire damage.

It was listed on the National Register of Historic Places in 1990.
