= Kirkland Cannery Building =

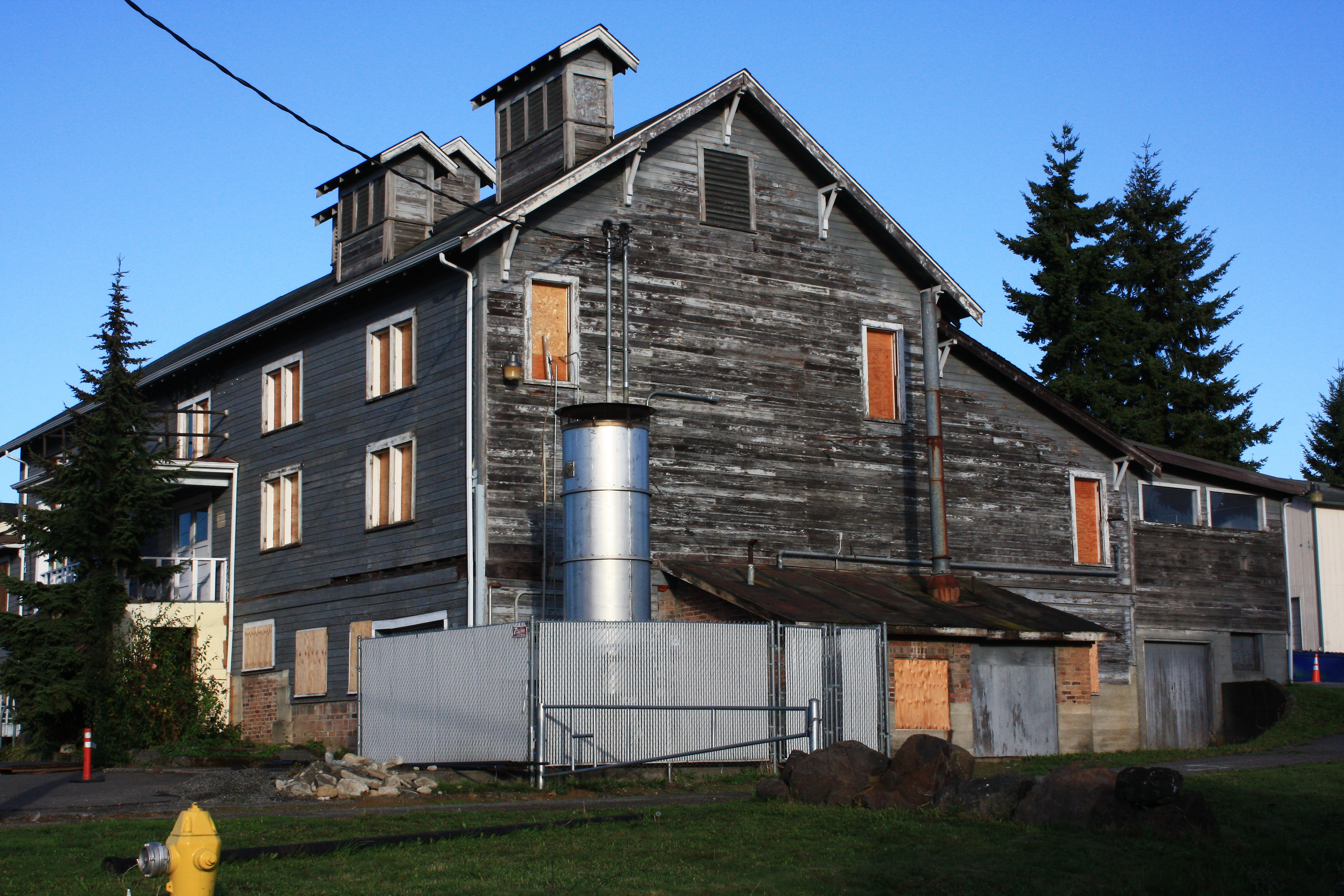
- Interactive map of the Kirkland Cannery Building area

General information
- Location: 640 8th Avenue, Kirkland, Washington, United States
- Coordinates: 47.6815°N 122.1950°W
- Completed: 1936

The Kirkland Cannery Building, also once called King County Food Processing Plant and State Cannery Number 4, is a historic building in Kirkland, Washington. It is an 11,000 ft^{2} cannery, built in 1936 by President Roosevelt's Works Progress Administration (WPA), and was sold to the City of Kirkland in 1941 for $44.79. It was operated as a cooperative to benefit the poor during the Great Depression, along with three other WPA plants at Kent, Wapato, and Wenatchee. Citizens could bring in crops, fish, and chicken, to be canned at no charge in exchange for donating one third of the product to "state institutions". During World War II, it "was largely as an aid to the general food conservation program and the war effort rather than as an economic aid to the communities served". Around this time, it produced a peak of 400,000 cans of food per season. After the war it was leased to local businesspeople and used for private concerns, then sold to them in 1974. They operated the Kirkland Custom Seafood business, using the cannery building as a smokehouse for Aldercove brand smoked salmon, processing 350,000 pounds of salmon there in 2000, the year before it closed.

Around 2006, the city was looking for a new owner to preserve the building, and in late 2014, the cannery building was sold to local resident and Philanthropist Carl Bradley who will preserve and restore the Cannery, returning it back to serve the community once again.
