= Canned fish =

Processed fish preserved in an airtight container

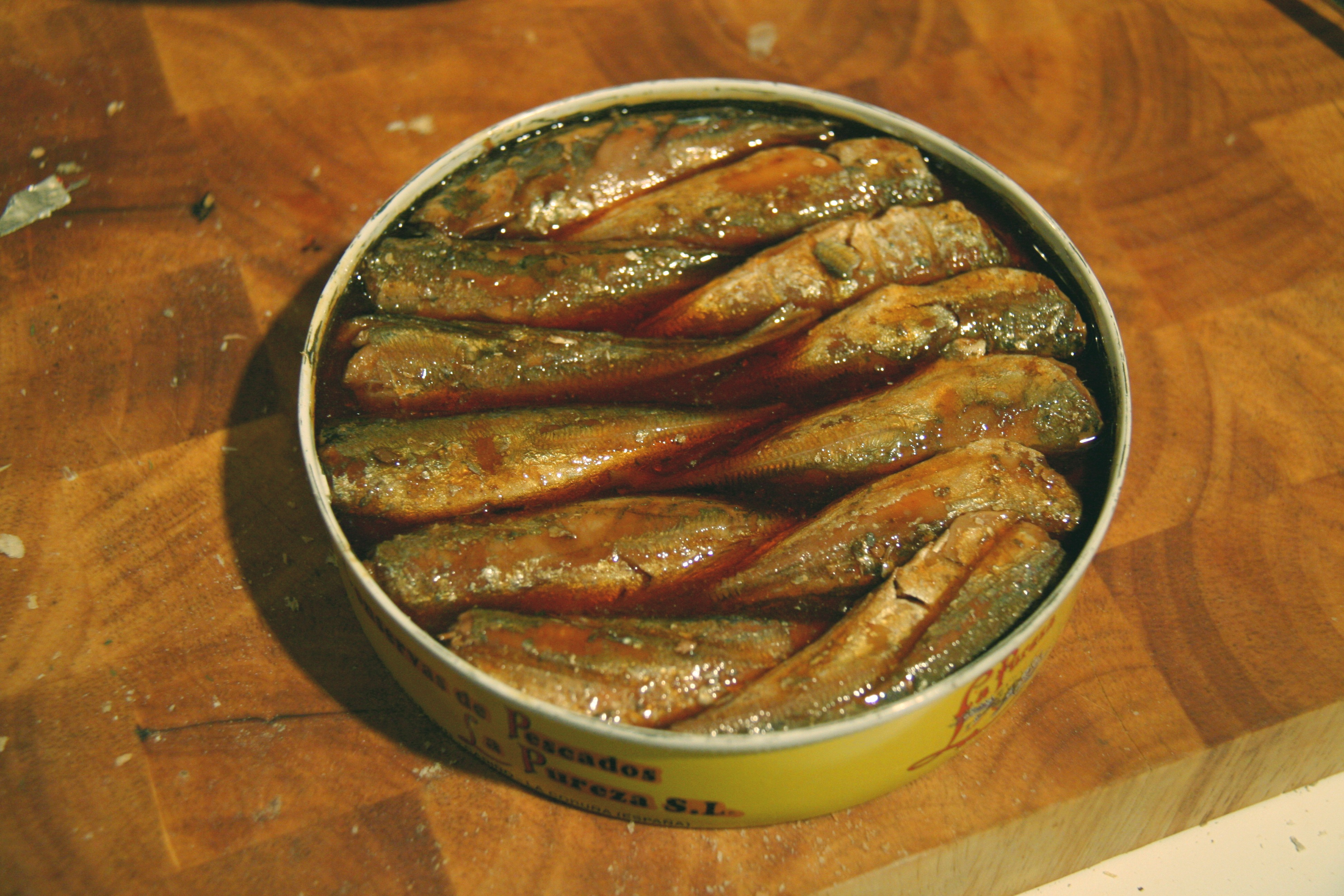
Canned pickled horse mackerel (chicharros en escabeche) from Spain

Canned or tinned fish are food fish which have been processed, sealed in an airtight container such as a sealed tin can, and subjected to heat. Canning is a method of preserving food, and provides a typical shelf life ranging from one to five years. They are usually opened via a can opener, but sometimes have a pull-tab so that they can be opened by hand. In the past it was common for many cans to have a key that would be turned to peel the lid of the tin off; most predominately sardines, among others.

Fish have low acidity levels at which microbes can flourish. From a public safety point of view, foods with low acidity (a pH more than 4.6) need sterilization at high temperatures of 116–130 °C (241–266 °F). Achieving temperatures above the boiling point requires pressurized cooking. After sterilization, the containing can prevents microorganisms from entering and proliferating inside. Other than sterilization, no method is dependable as a preservative. For example, the microorganism Clostridium botulinum (which causes botulism) can only be eliminated at temperatures above the boiling point.

Preservation techniques are needed to prevent spoilage and lengthen shelf life. They are designed to inhibit the activity of spoilage bacteria and the metabolic changes leading to a loss of quality. Spoilage bacteria are the specific bacteria that produce the unpleasant odours and flavours associated with spoiled fish.

== Background ==
The "father of canning" is the Frenchman Nicolas Appert. In 1795, he began experimenting with ways to preserve fish in jars. He placed jars of fish in boiling water. During the first years of the Napoleonic Wars, the French government offered a 12,000 franc prize to anyone who could devise a cheap and effective method of preserving large amounts of food. The larger armies of the period required increased and regular supplies of quality food. Appert submitted his invention and won the prize in January 1810. The reason for lack of spoilage was unknown at the time, since it would be another 50 years before Louis Pasteur demonstrated the role of microbes in food spoilage. However, glass containers presented problems for transportation. Shortly after, the British inventor and merchant Peter Durand patented his own method, this time in a tin can, creating the modern-day process of canning foods.

Canning was used in the 1830s in Scotland to keep fish fresh until it could be marketed. By the 1840s, salmon was being canned in North America in Maine and New Brunswick. American commercial salmon canneries had their origins in California, and in the northwest of the US, particularly on the Columbia River. They were never significant on the U.S. Atlantic coast. By the 1940s, the principal canneries had shifted to Alaska.

== Salmon ==
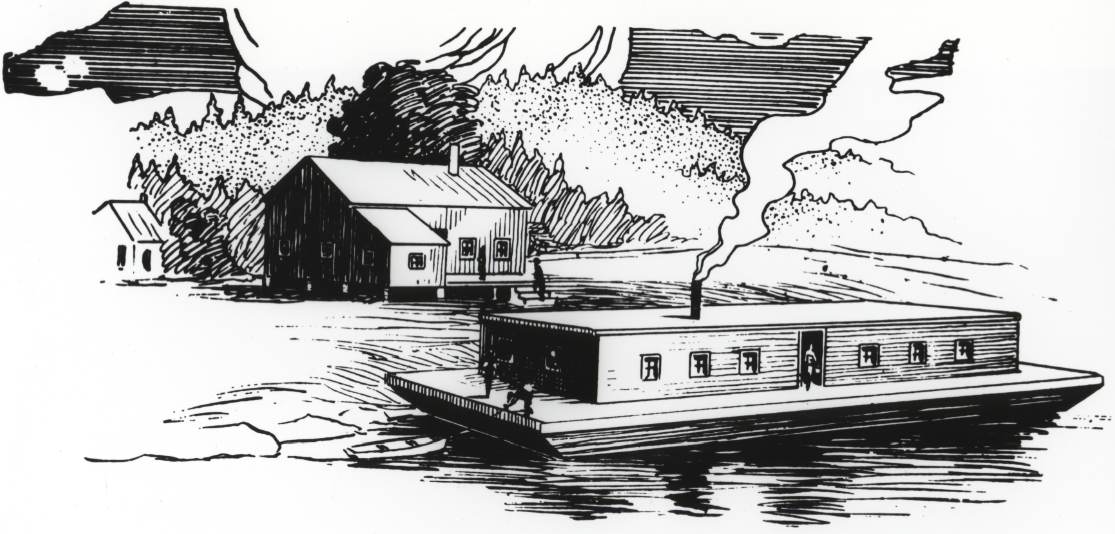
The first industrial-scale fish cannery, a salmon cannery established in 1864 on a barge in the Sacramento River in California

A salmon cannery is a factory that commercially cans salmon. It is a fish processing industry that pioneered the practice of canning fish in general. It became established on the Pacific coast of North America during the nineteenth century, and subsequently expanded to other parts of the world that had easy access to salmon.

Prior to canning, fish were salted to preserve them. Through preservation, fish could be transported and sold large distances from where they were caught. At the start of the 19th century, salted salmon caught in Alaska was available in St. Petersburg. Shortly after, the Northwest Fur Company started marketing salted salmon from the Columbia River. It then merged with the Hudson's Bay Company, and the salmon was marketed in Australia, China, Hawaii, Japan and the eastern United States. Later, some salmon salteries were converted to salmon canneries.

The first industrial scale salmon cannery in North America was established in 1864 on a barge in the Sacramento River near West Sacramento by the four Hume brothers together with their partner Andrew S. Hapgood. In 1866 the Hume brothers relocated the business to a site 50 miles inland on the Columbia River. The history of North American salmon canneries is exemplified by their history on the Columbia River. Within a few years each of the Hume brothers had his own cannery. By 1872, Robert Hume was operating a number of canneries, bringing in Chinese workers willing to work for low wages to do the cannery work, and having local Native Americans do the fishing. By 1883, salmon canneries had become the major industry on the Columbia River, with 1,700 gillnet boats supplying 39 canneries with 15,000 tonnes of salmon annually, mainly Chinook.

== Sardines ==
Typical can of sardines, in salt water

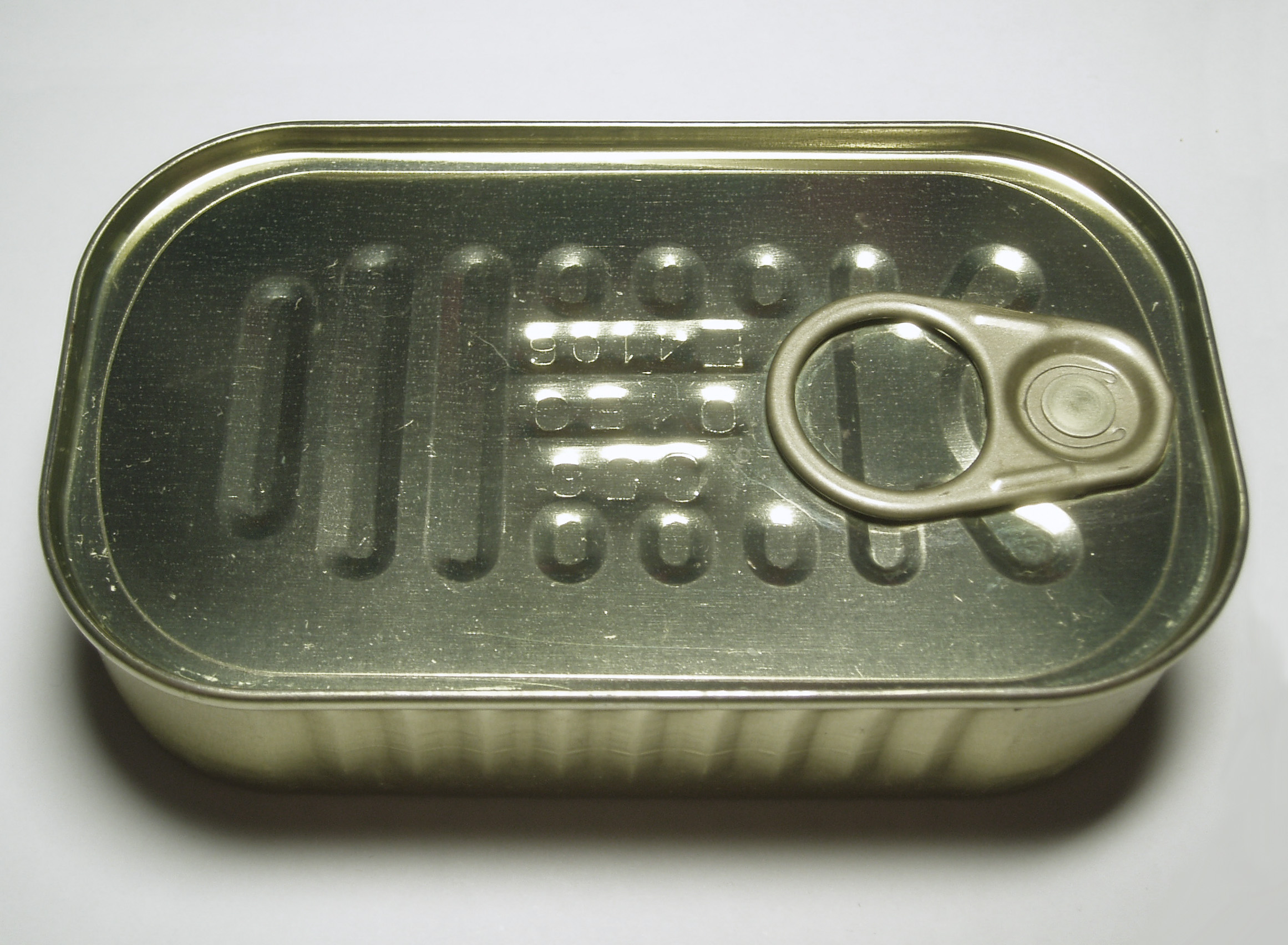
Sealed

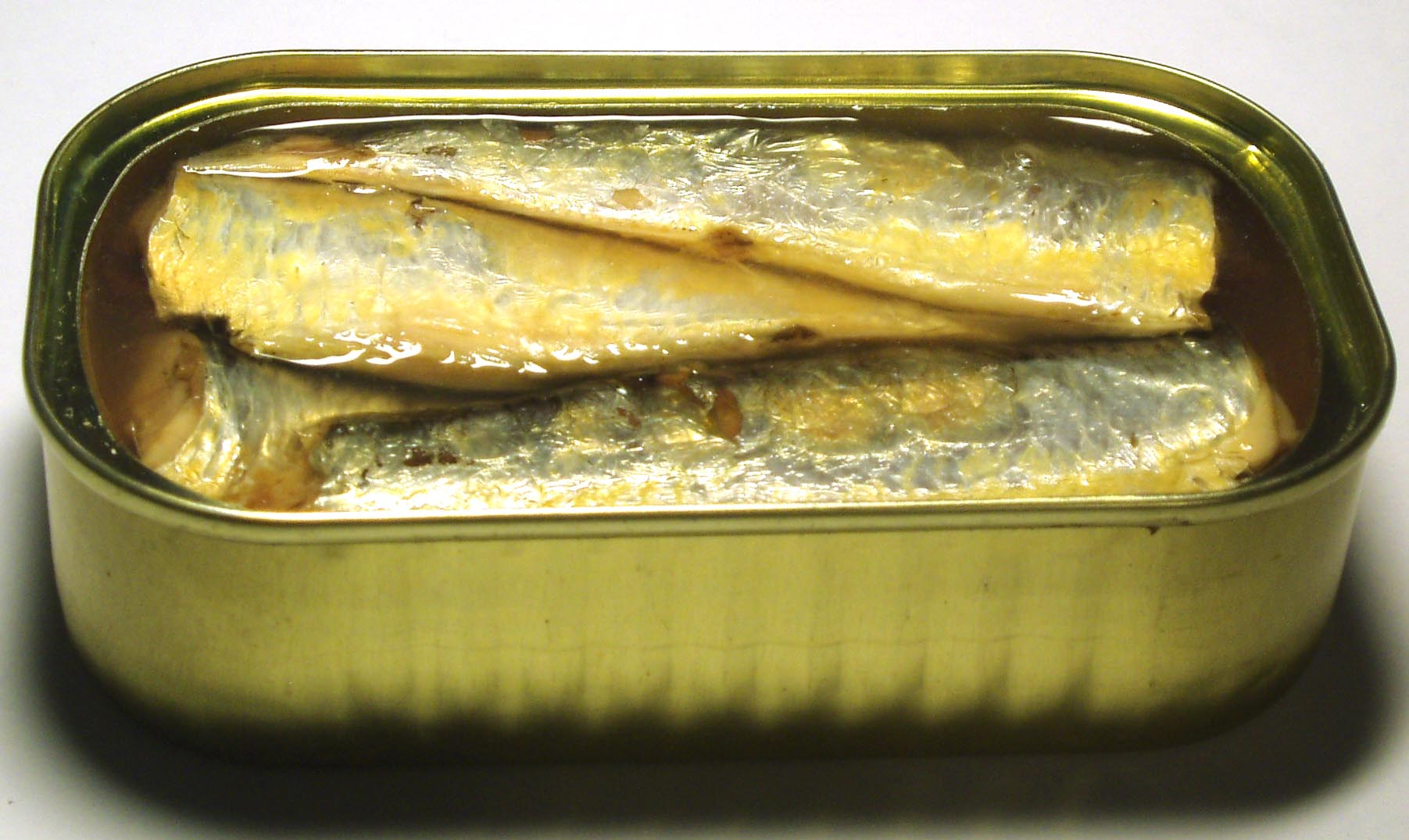
Opened

Sardines (or pilchards) are canned in many different ways. At the cannery, the fish are washed, their heads are removed, and the fish are cooked, either by deep-frying or by steam-cooking, after which they are dried. They are then packed in either olive, sunflower or soybean oil, water, or in a tomato, chili, or mustard sauce.

Canned sardines in supermarkets may actually be sprat (such as the “brisling sardine”) or round herrings. Fish sizes vary by species. Good quality sardines should have the head and gills removed before packing. They may also be eviscerated before packing (typically the larger varieties). If not, they should be purged of undigested or partially digested food or feces by holding the live fish in a tank long enough for them to empty their digestive systems.

Sardines are typically tightly packed in a small can which is scored for easy opening, either with a pull tab (similar to how a beverage can is opened), or a key, attached to the underside of the can. Thus, it has the virtues of being an easily portable, nonperishable, self-contained food.

The close packing of sardines in the can has led to their metaphorical use of the name ("packed like sardines") in describing any situation where people or objects are crowded together, for instance, in a bus or subway car. "Sardines" has also been used as the name of a children's game, where one person hides and each successive person who finds the hidden one packs into the same space until there is only one left out, who becomes the next one to hide.

== Tuna ==
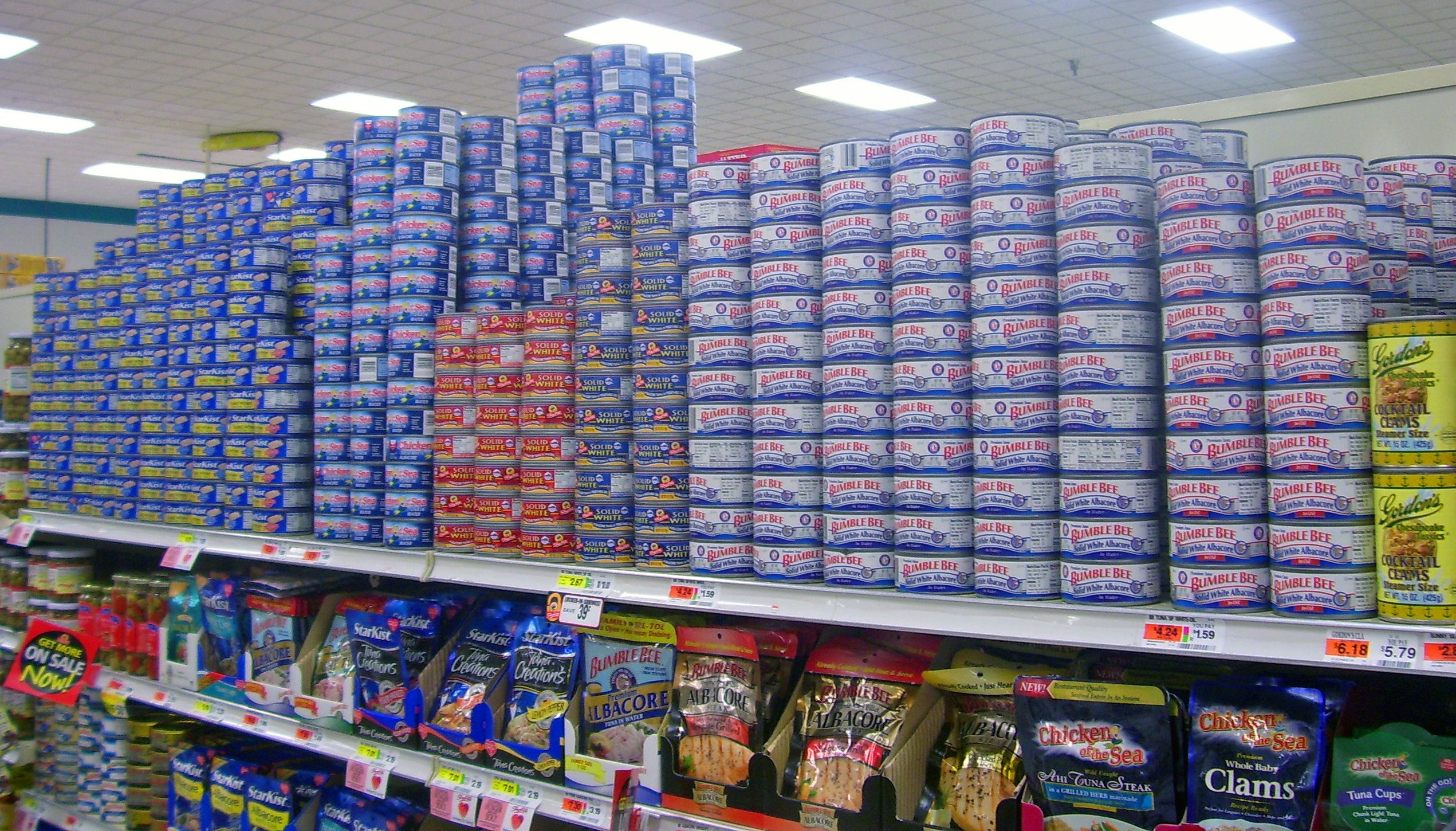
Canned tuna for sale at a supermarket

Tuna is canned in edible vegetable oils, in brine, in water, or in various sauces. In the United States, canned tuna is sometimes called tuna fish and only albacore can legally be sold in canned form as "white meat tuna"; in other countries, yellowfin is also acceptable. While in the early 1980s, canned tuna in Australia was most likely southern bluefin; as of 2003 it was usually yellowfin, skipjack, or tongol (labelled "northern bluefin").

Tunas are often caught far from where they are processed for canning, so poor interim conservation can lead to spoilage. Tuna is typically gutted by hand and later precooked for prescribed times of 45 minutes to three hours. The fish are then cleaned and filleted, canned (and sealed), with the dark lateral blood meat often separately canned for pet food (cat or dog). The sealed can itself is then heated (called "retort cooking") for 2–4 hours.

The retort cooking process kills any bacteria but retains the histamine that can produce rancid flavors. The international standard sets the maximum histamine level at 200 milligrams per kilogram. An Australian study of 53 varieties of unflavored canned tuna found none to exceed the safe histamine level, although some had "off" flavors. The level of omega-3 oils found in canned tuna can be highly variable, since some common manufacturing methods destroy omega-3 oils.

Australian standards once required cans of tuna to contain at least 51% tuna meat, but these regulations were dropped in 2003. The remaining weight is usually oil or water. In the United States, the Food and Drug Administration (FDA) regulates the amount of tuna in a can. In 2008, some tuna cans dropped from 6 ounces (170 g) to 5 ounces (140 g) due to "higher tuna costs". In the United States, 52% of canned tuna is used for sandwiches, 22% for salads, and 15% for casseroles and dried, packaged meal mixes.

== Other fish species ==
Other fish commonly canned include anchovy, cod, herring, and mackerel.

== Gallery ==
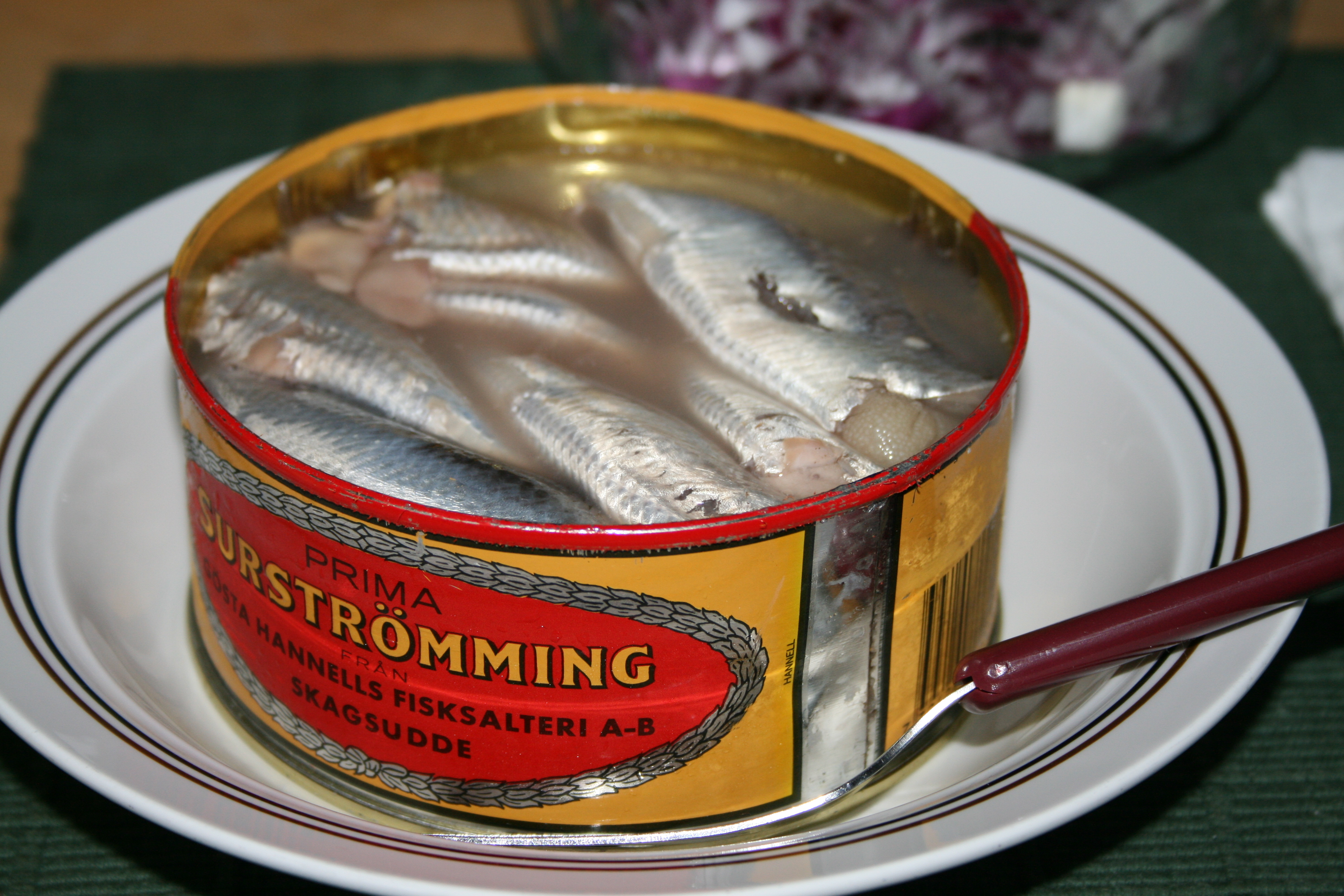
Canned Surströmming, Sweden

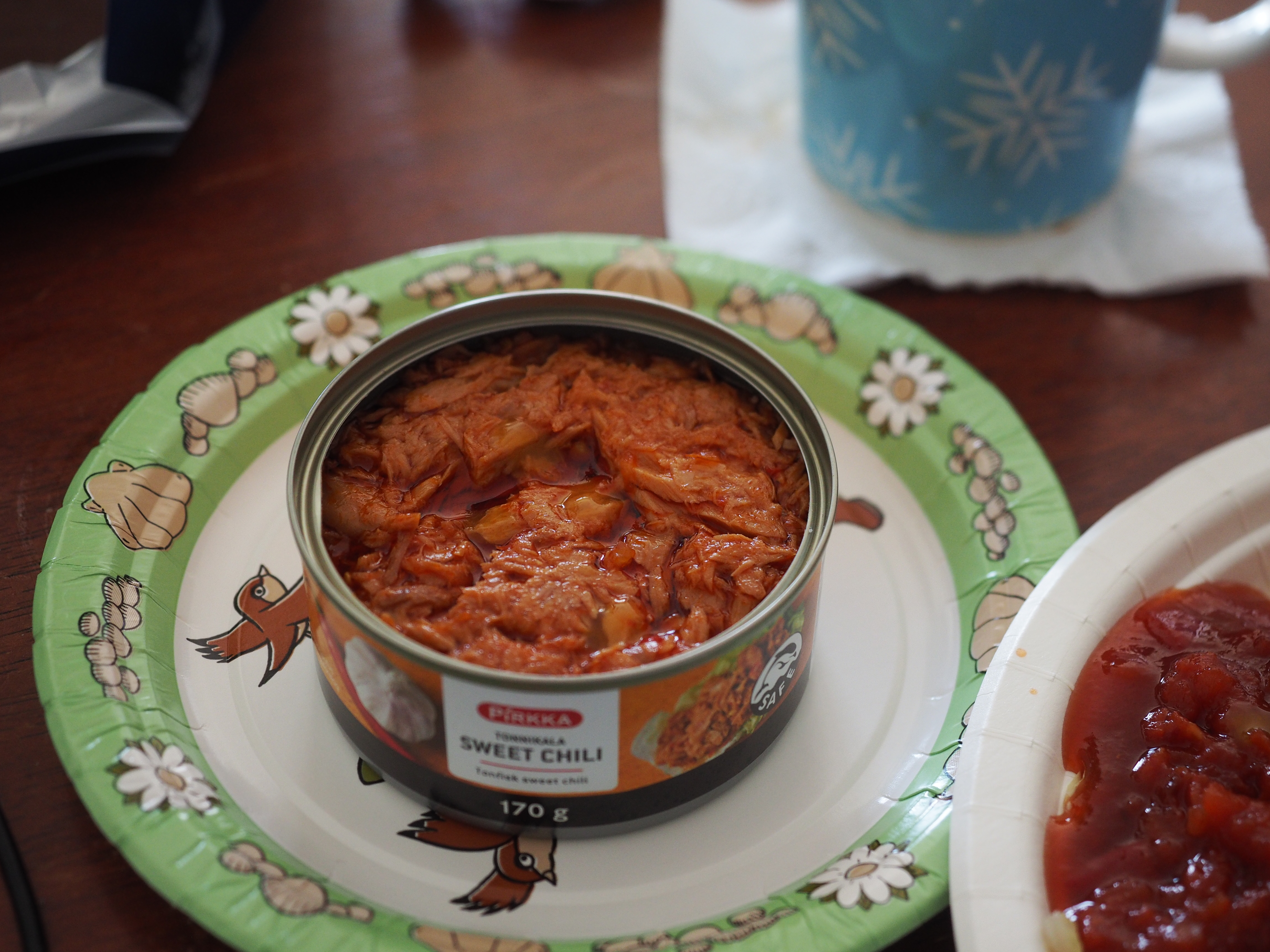
Canned tuna in Sweet Chili sauce, Finland

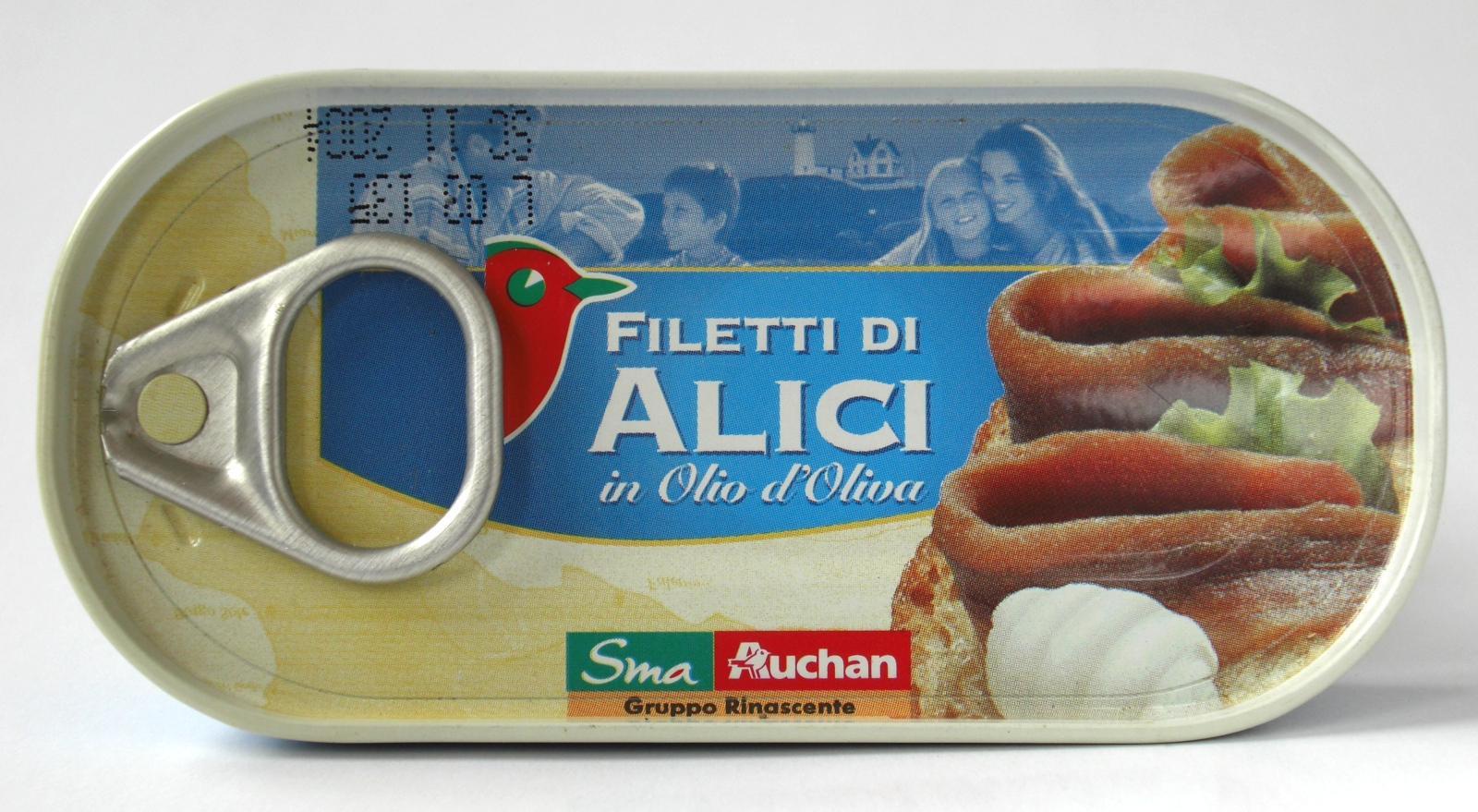
Canned anchovies, Italy

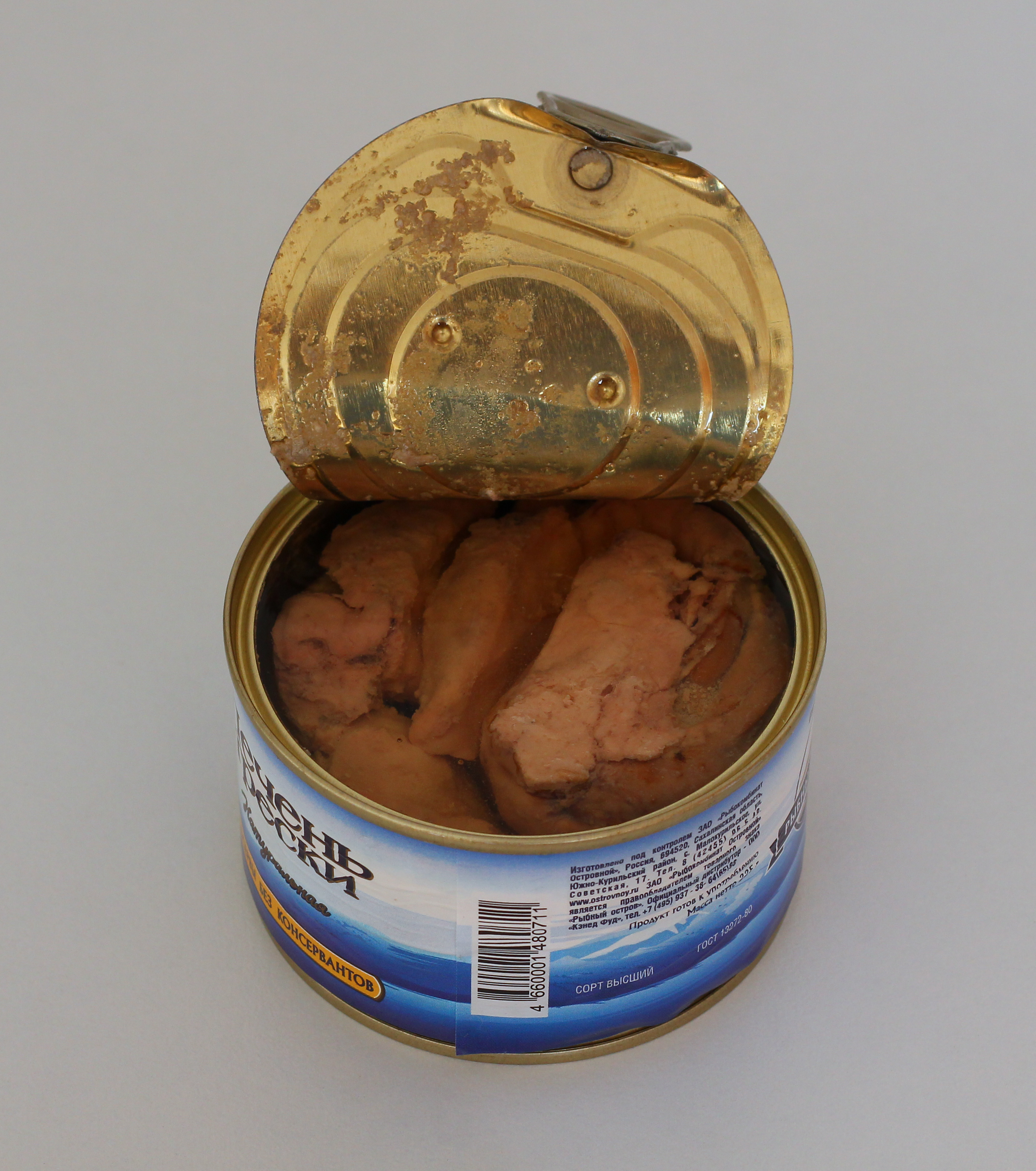
Canned cod liver, Russia

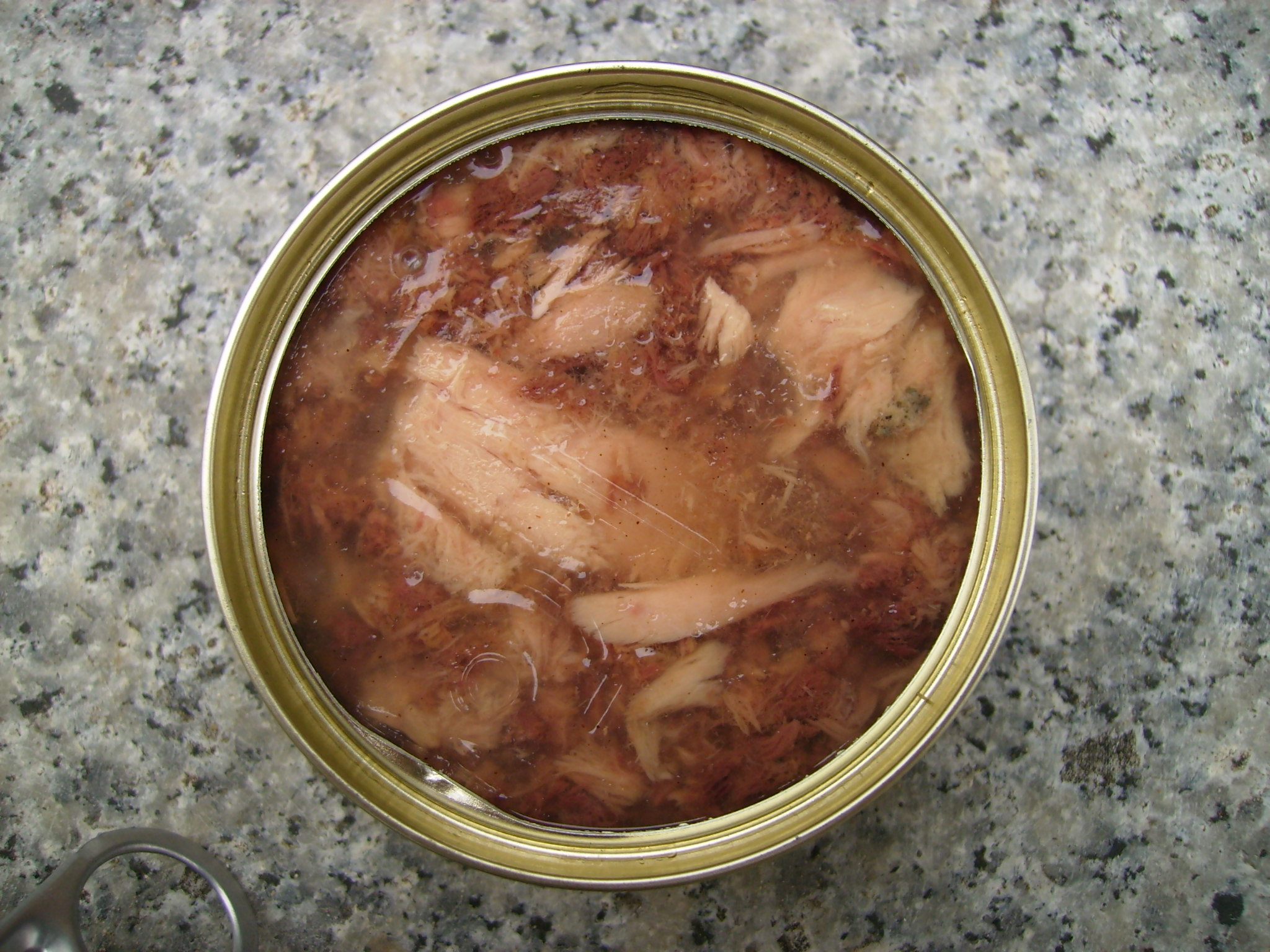
Canned cat food in jelly

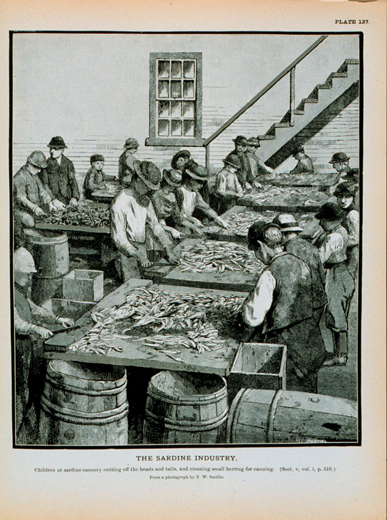
Children cleaning Atlantic herring at a cannery

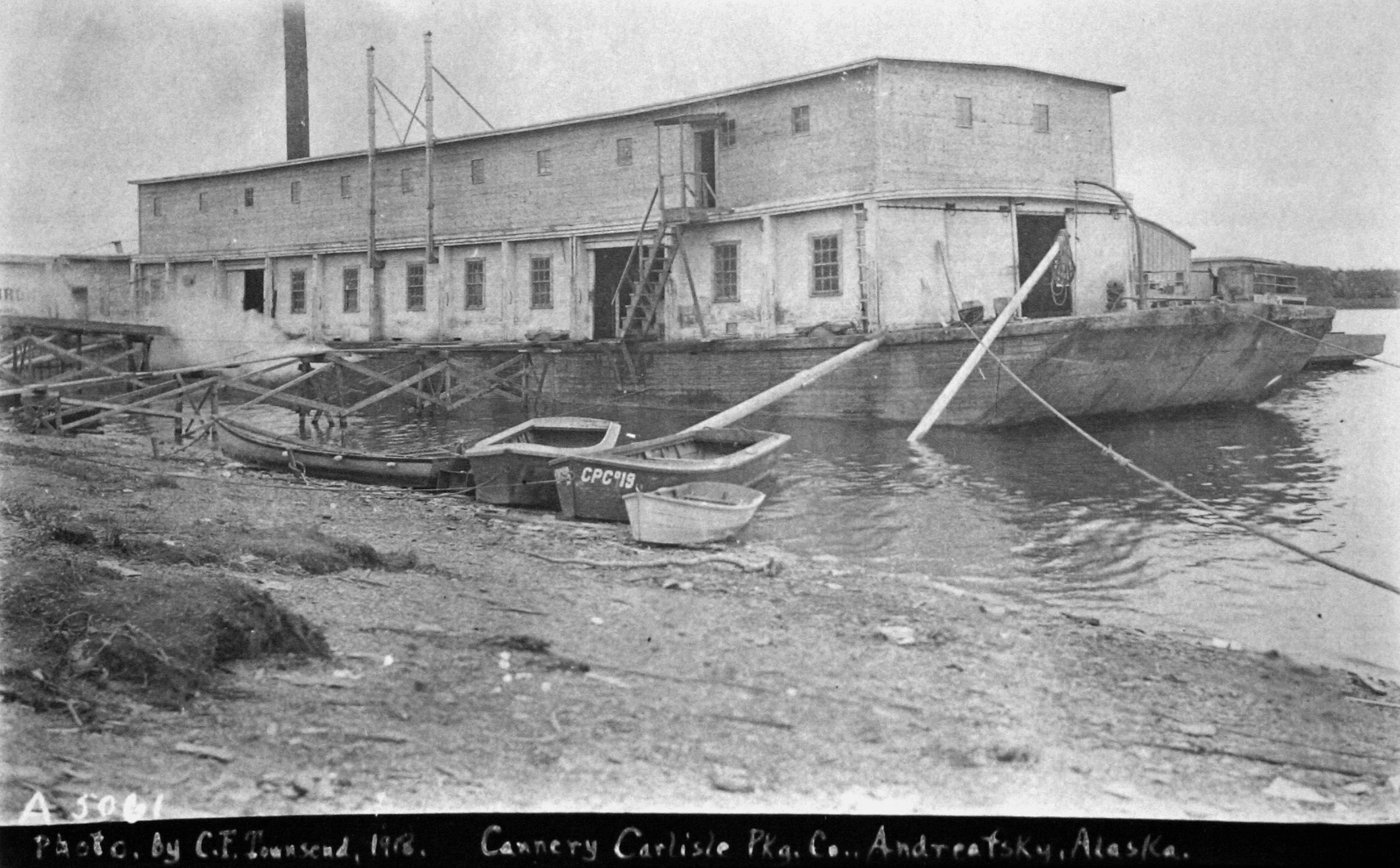
Carlisle Packaging Company, a floating cod cannery, Yukon River, Alaska, c. 1918

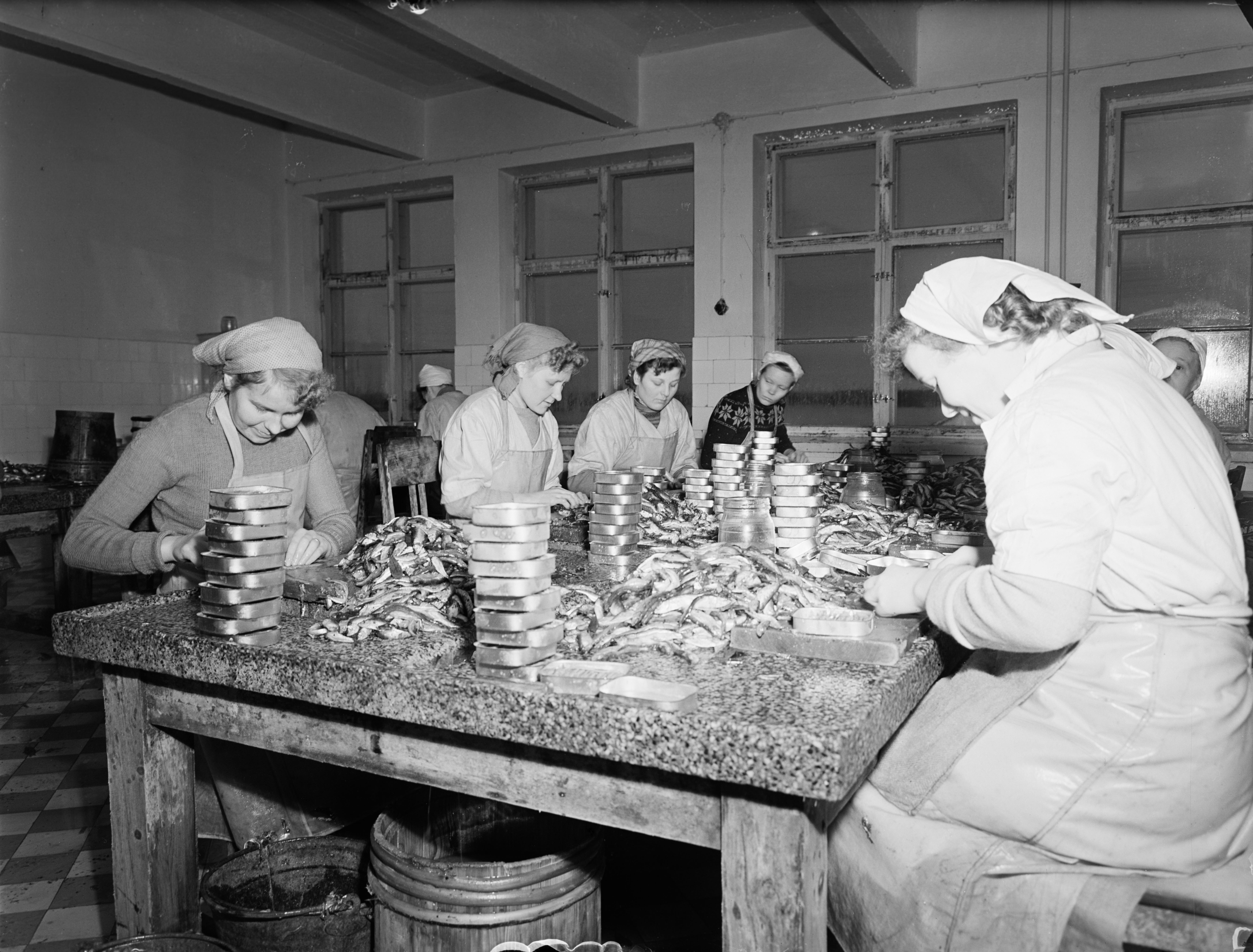
Employees of Suomen Kalastus Oy's fish canning factory in Loviisa, Finland packing small fish in cans in 1936

== See also ==
- Cannery Row in Monterey, California
  - The novel Cannery Row
  - The film Cannery Row
- Fish preservation
- Fish processing
- List of canneries
