= Blue Diamond Growers =

American agricultural co-operative

- Type: Agricultural marketing cooperative
- Founded: 1910; 116 years ago (as California Almond Growers' Exchange)
- Headquarters: Calpak Plant No. 11, Sacramento, California, U.S.
- Key people: Kai Bockmann (CEO)
- Products: Blue Diamond; Almond Breeze; Nut-Thins
- Number of employees: 1,800
- Website: bluediamondgrowers.com

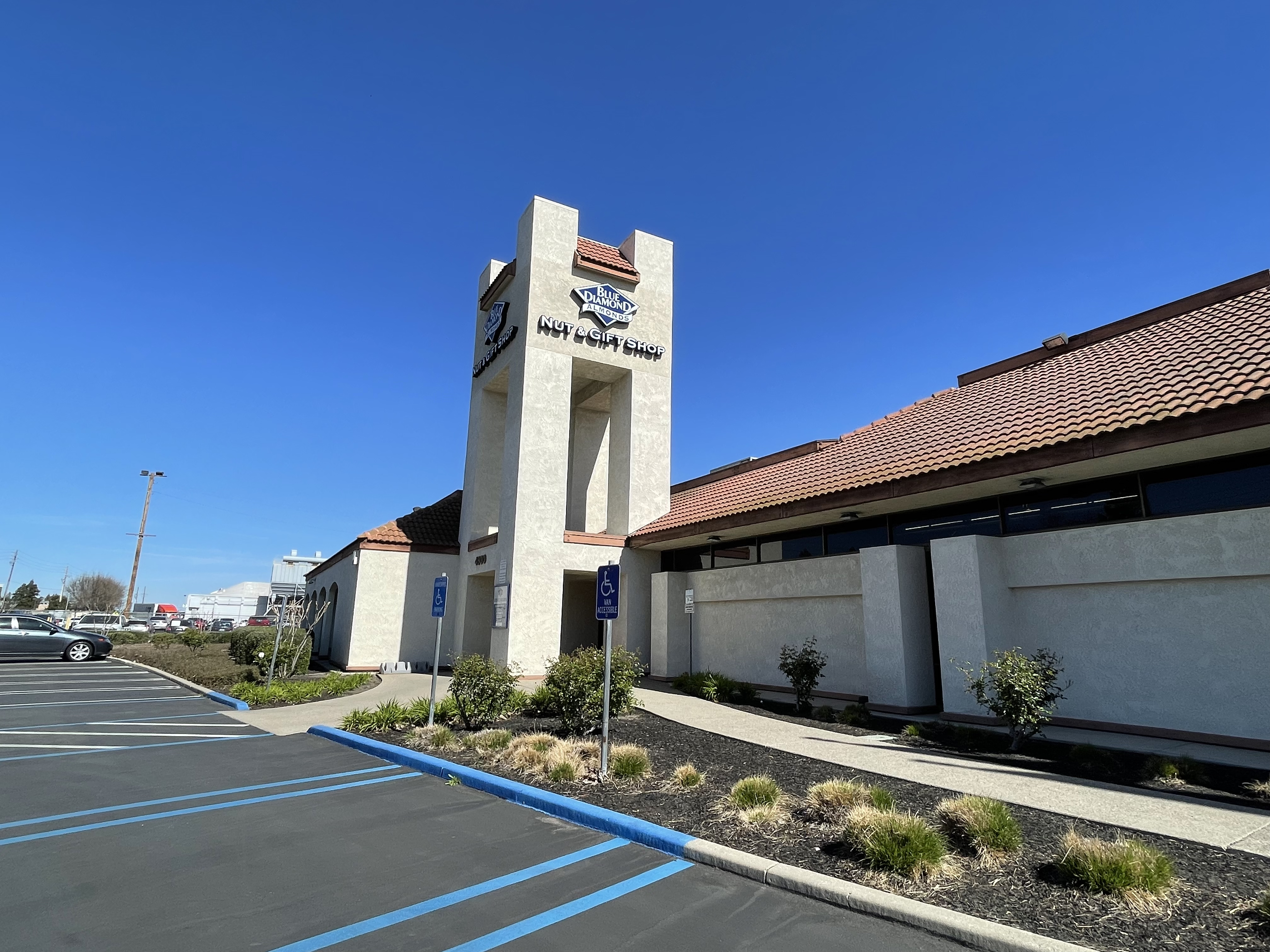
Blue Diamond gift shop in Salida, California

Blue Diamond Growers is an agricultural cooperative and marketing organization that specializes in California almonds. Founded in 1910 as the California Almond Growers' Exchange, the organization claims to be the world's largest tree nut processing and marketing company. It serves 3,500 almond growers, and helps make the almond crop (valued at over $1 billion) California's largest food export.

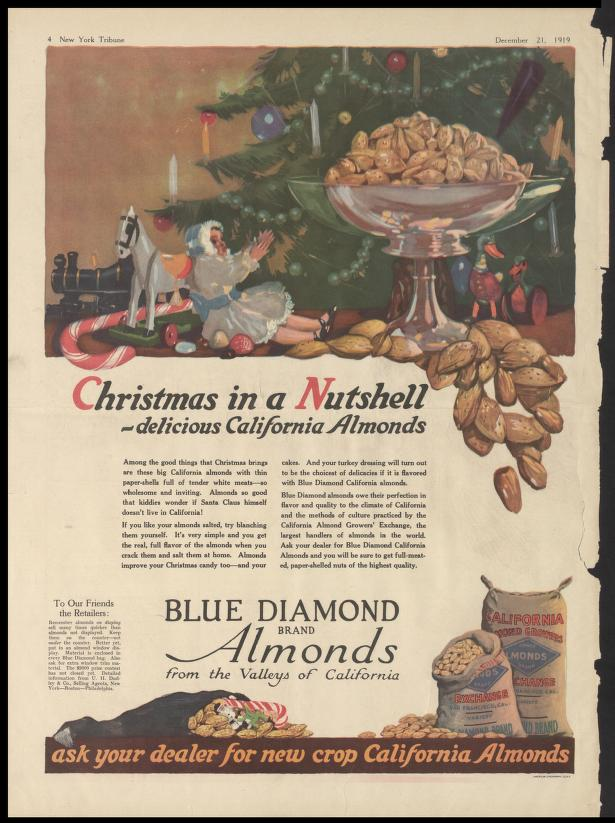
1919 Christmas ad for the almonds.

The company produces almonds and almond-derived products in various forms, including roasted almonds, almond milk, and crackers. The cooperative is privately held. In 2021, the company reported annual revenue of $1.59 billion.

The organization is headquartered in Sacramento, California, with two other manufacturing plants in Salida, California and Turlock, California.

From 2004 to 2008 it resisted attempts by the International Longshore and Warehouse Union to organize workers at its processing plant. Blue Diamond was found by the National Labor Relations Board to have violated a federal labor law in its campaign against the union. In November 2008, however, the union lost an NLRB-supervised vote to establish a branch.

== See also ==
- Calpak Plant No. 11
- Diamond of California – an unrelated walnut growing company (and former cooperative)
