= Samuel Elmore Cannery =

- Elmore, Samuel, Cannery
- Formerly listed on the U.S. National Register of Historic Places
- Former U.S. National Historic Landmark
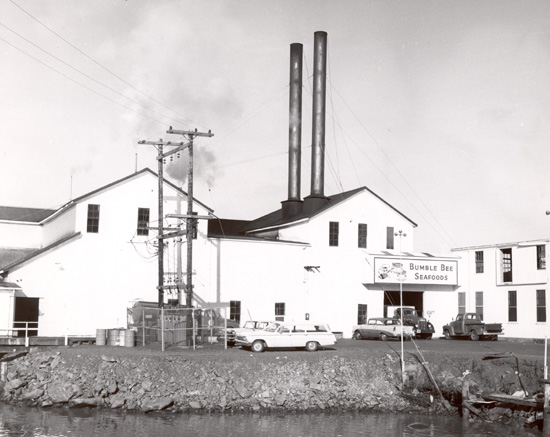
- Samuel Elmore Cannery while it was in operation, with a "Bumble Bee" sign hanging above the door

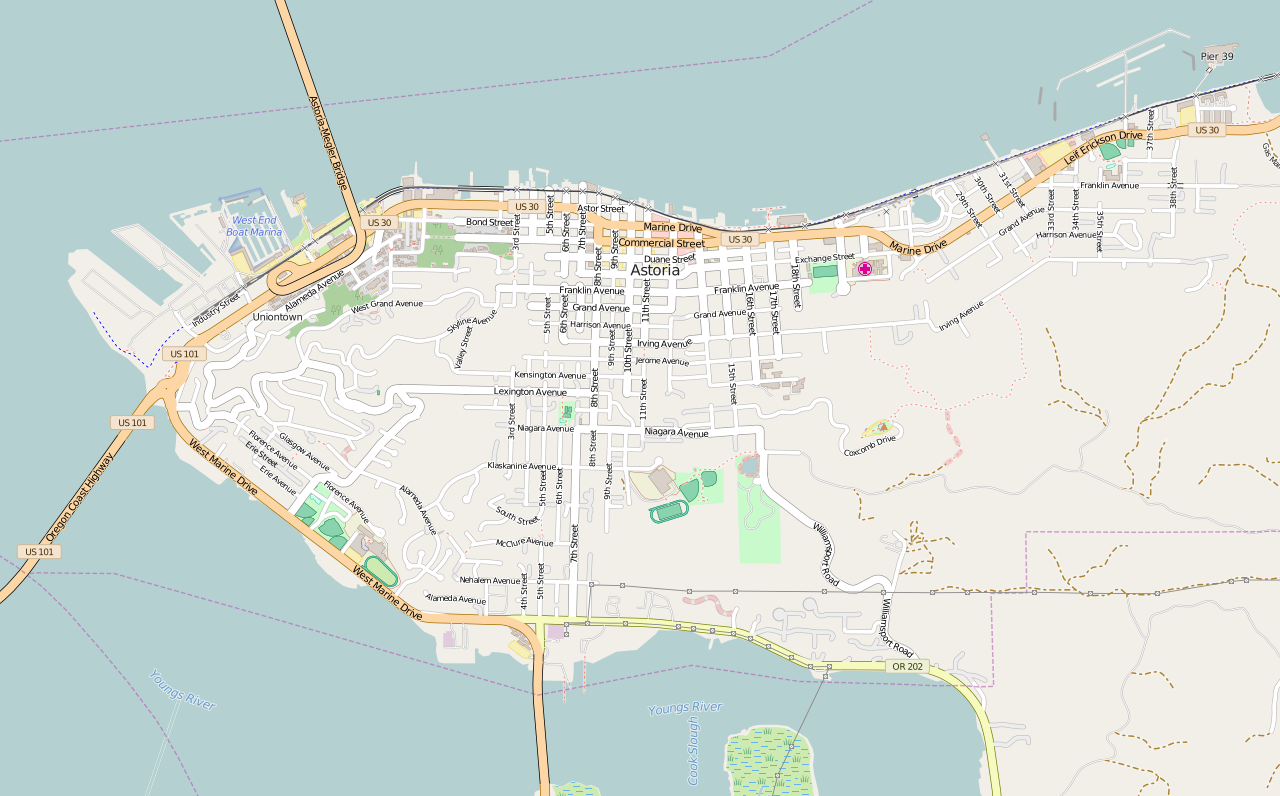
- Location within Astoria OR
- Location: On the waterfront at the foot of Flavel St., Astoria, Oregon
- Coordinates: 46°11′30″N 123°50′45″W
- Area: 2 acres (0.81 ha)
- Built: 1881
- NRHP reference No.: 66000638

Significant dates
- Added to NRHP: November 13, 1966
- Designated NHL: November 13, 1966
- Removed from NRHP: July 16, 1993
- Delisted NHL: July 16, 1993

Samuel Elmore Cannery was a U.S. National Historic Landmark in Astoria, Oregon that was designated in 1966 but was delisted in 1993.

The home of "Bumble Bee" brand tuna, it was the longest continuously-operated salmon cannery in the United States, from its construction in 1898 until decommissioning in 1980. The canned salmon industry was a cornerstone of the Northwest's resource-based economy from the late 1860s until after World War II. Amidst declining salmon stocks, the cannery diversified into tuna in the 1930s. Due to structural deterioration, the building was slated for demolition in 1991, and it was destroyed by fire on January 26, 1993.

== See also ==
- Sue H. Elmore (ship)
- List of canneries
- List of National Historic Landmarks in Oregon
- National Register of Historic Places listings in Clatsop County, Oregon
