= Blue Island, Illinois =

- City
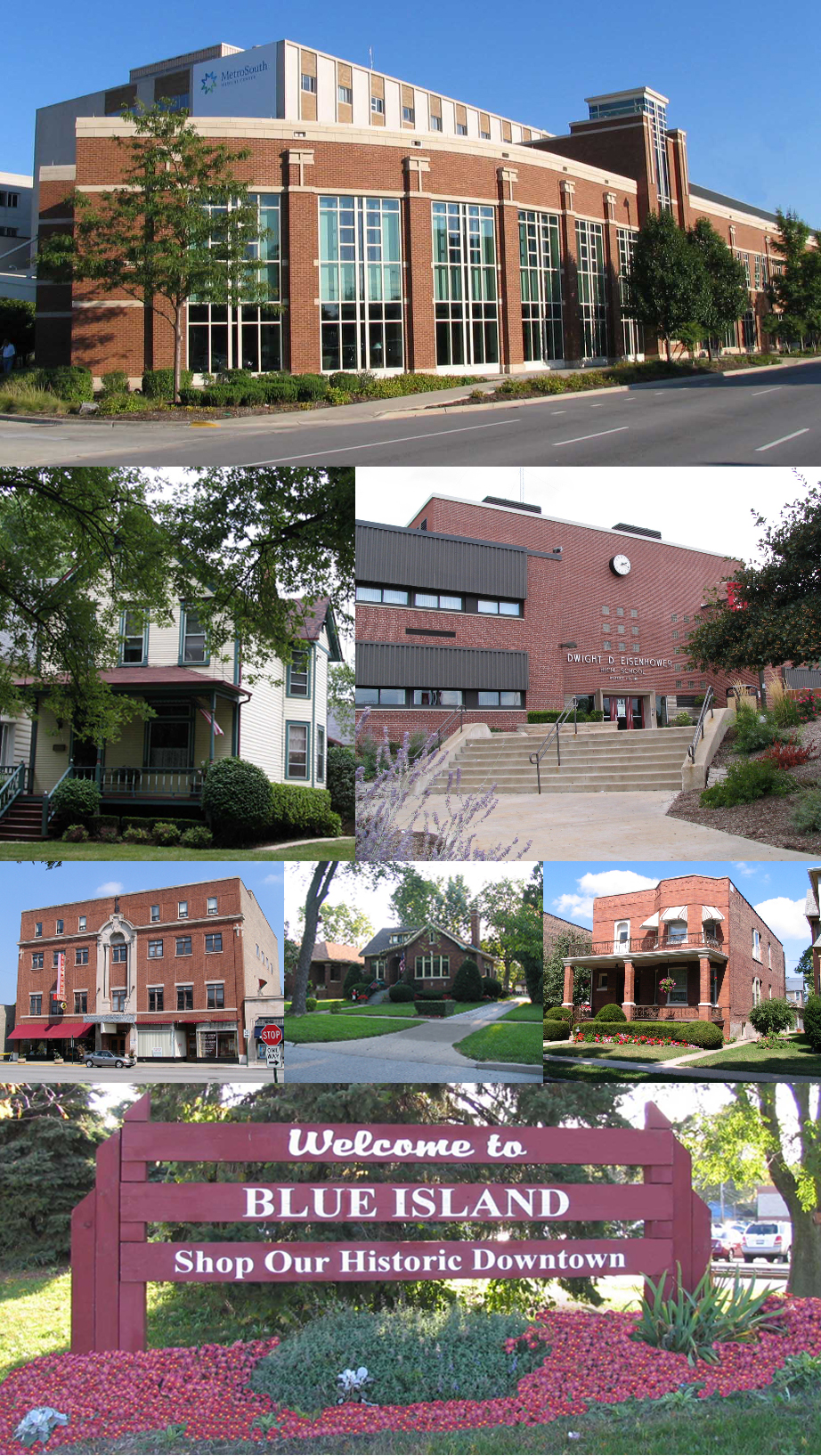

- Flag Seal Logo
- Nickname: The City on the Hill
- Motto: "Discover Blue Island: The Historic Heart of Chicago Southland"
- Location of Blue Island in Cook County, Illinois.

- Location within the state of Illinois Blue Island, Illinois (the United States)
- Coordinates: 41°39′26″N 87°40′48″W
- Country: United States
- State: Illinois
- Counties: Cook
- Townships: Bremen, Worth, Thornton
- Settled: 1835
- Incorporated: October 26, 1872

Government
  - Type: Mayor-council government
  - Mayor: Fred Bilotto (United Blue Island)
  - City Council: Aldermen: 1st Ward; Dexter Johnson; 2nd Ward; Luiz Montoya; 3rd Ward; Nancy Rita; 4th Ward; Bill Fahrenwald; 5th Ward; Gabriel McGee; 6th Ward; Candace Carr; 7th Ward; Josh Roll
  - State House: Robert Rita (D)
  - State Senate: Emil Jones, Jr. (D)
  - U.S. House: Representatives: 1st District Jonathan Jackson (D); 2nd District Robin Kelly (D)

Area
  - Total: 4.16 sq mi (10.77 km^{2})
  - Land: 4.07 sq mi (10.54 km^{2})
  - Water: 0.085 sq mi (0.22 km^{2}) 2.16%
- Elevation: 640 ft (195 m)

Population (2020)
  - Total: 22,558
  - Density: 5,540.9/sq mi (2,139.34/km^{2})
  - Demonym: Blue Islander
- Time zone: UTC−6 (CST)
  - Summer (DST): UTC−5 (CDT)
- ZIP code: 60406
- Area codes: 708/464
- FIPS code: 17-06704
- Website: www.blueisland.org

Blue Island is a city in Cook County, Illinois, United States, 16 miles (26 km) south of Chicago's Loop. Blue Island is adjacent to the city of Chicago and shares its northern boundary with that city's Morgan Park neighborhood. The population was 22,558 at the 2020 United States census.

Blue Island was established in the 1830s as a way station for settlers traveling on the Vincennes Trace, and the settlement prospered because it was conveniently situated a day's journey outside of Chicago. In 1884, Alfred T. Andreas observed, "The location of Blue Island Village is a beautiful one. Nowhere about Chicago is there to be found a more pleasant and desirable resident locality."

Since its founding, the city has been an important commercial center in the south Cook County region, although its position in that respect has been eclipsed in recent years as other significant population centers developed around it and the region's commercial resources became spread over a wider area. In addition to its broad long-standing industrial base, the city enjoyed notable growth in the 1840s during the construction of the feeder canal (now the Calumet Sag Channel) for the Illinois and Michigan Canal and as the center of a large brick-making industry beginning in the 1850s, which eventually gave Blue Island the status of brick-making capital of the world. Beginning in 1883, Blue Island was also host to the car shops of the Rock Island Railroad. Blue Island was home to several breweries, who used the east side of the hill to store their product before the advent of refrigeration, until the Eighteenth Amendment made these breweries illegal in 1919. A large regional hospital and two major clinics are also located in the city.

Although initially settled by "Yankee" stock, Blue Island has been the point of entry for many of America's immigrants, beginning in the 1840s with the arrival of a large German population that remained a prominent part of the city's ethnic makeup for many years. By 1850, half of Blue Island's population was either foreign-born or the children of foreign-born residents. Later, significant groups came from Italy, Poland, Sweden and Mexico.

The city is one of eleven incorporated areas in Illinois to have been designated by the White House as a "Preserve America" community.

== History ==
=== Uptown ===
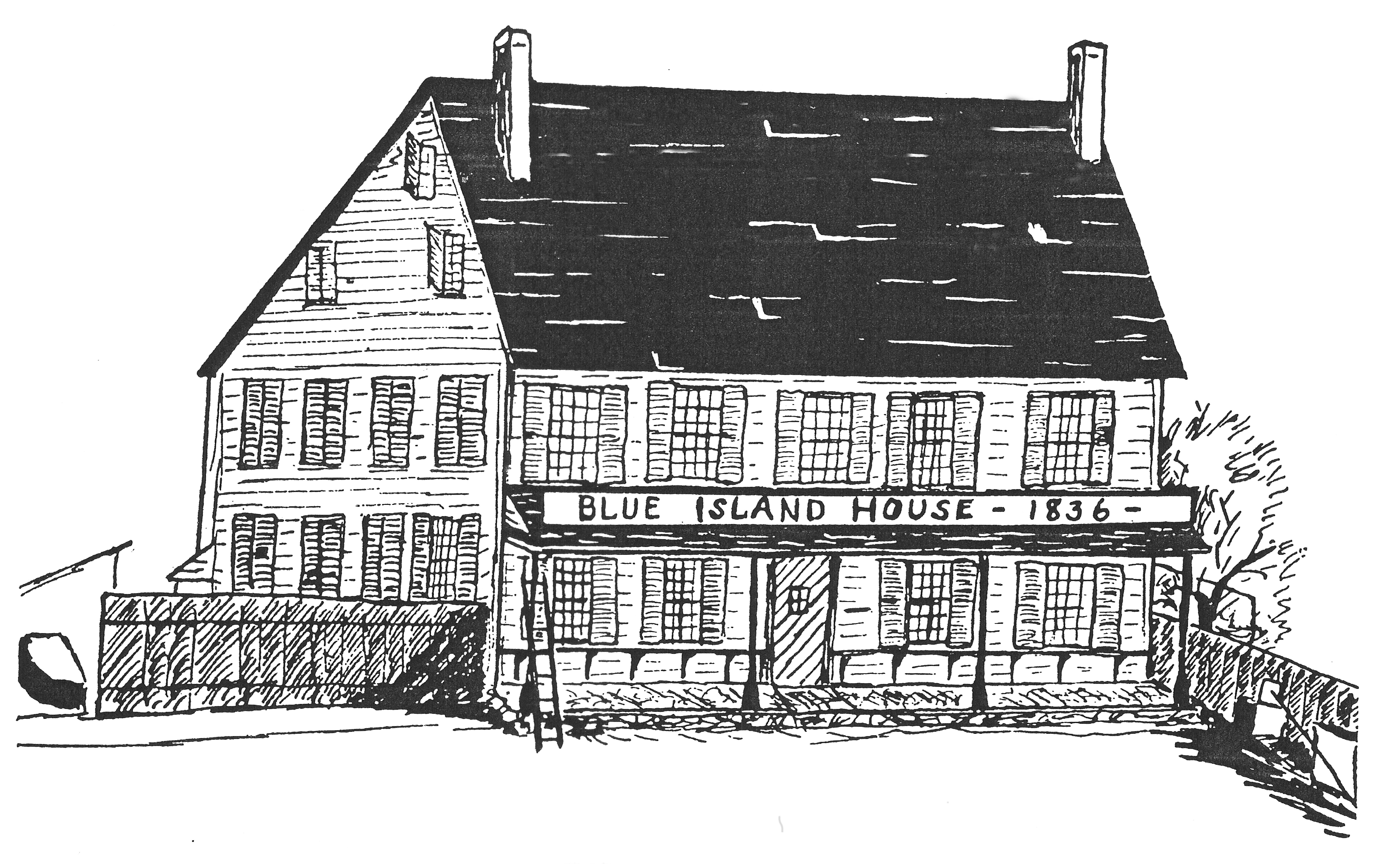
Blue Island House

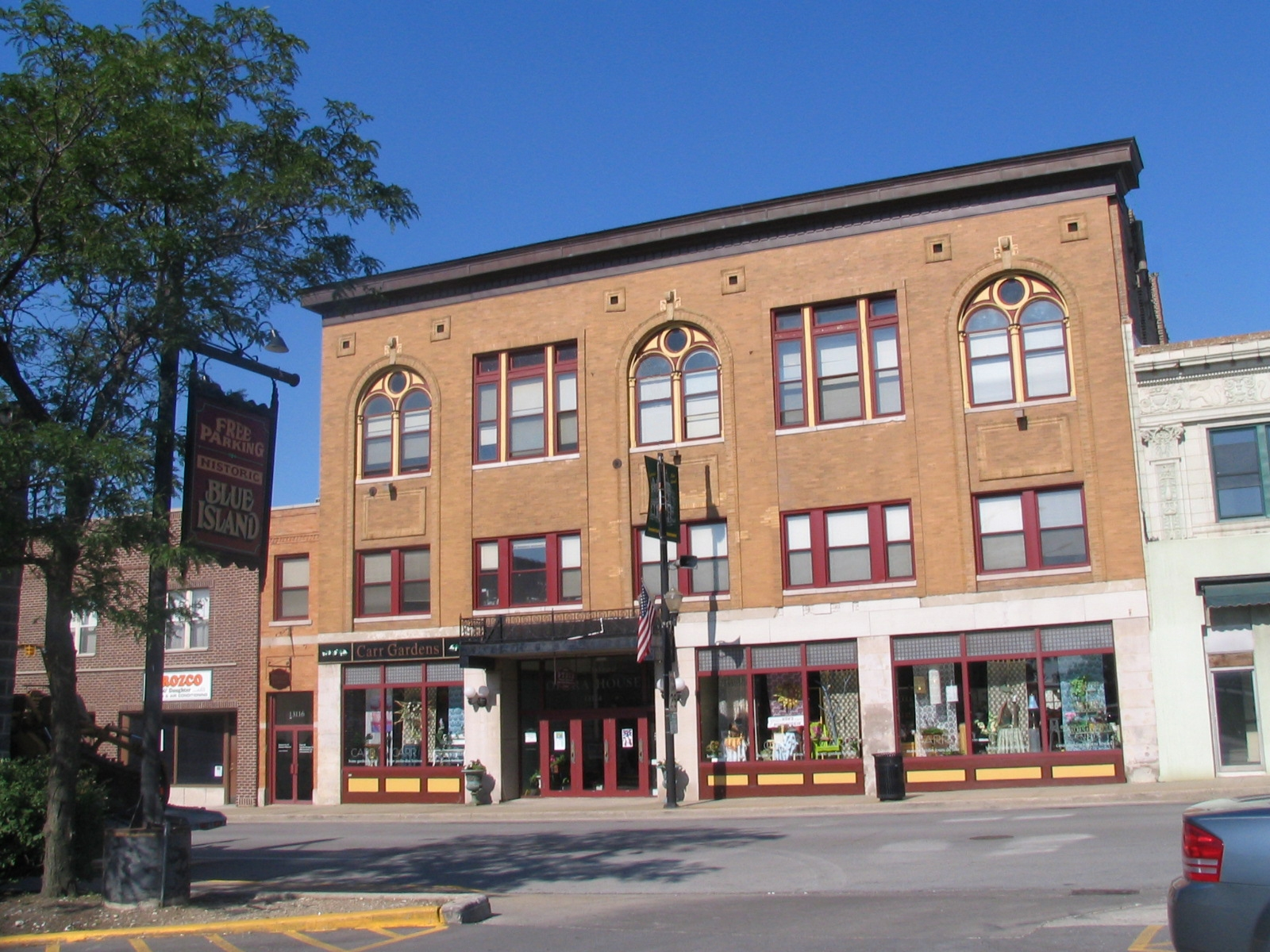
Blue Island Opera House

Norman Rexford came to Chicago from Charlotte, Vermont in 1835 and in 1836 became the first permanent settler of Blue Island when he established the Blue Island House near the intersection of present-day Western Avenue and Gregory Street just north of the Western Avenue bridge. Before Rexford built the Blue Island House he had constructed a four-room log cabin in the wilderness at the north end of the Blue Island ridge that he intended as a tavern for wayfarers, but after a year realized that the place was not likely to be profitable for him and began to look for another site where he might have more success. Although farther from Fort Dearborn and the settlement at Chicago (which by that time was incorporated and had a population of several thousand persons) by about 3 miles (5 km), the new inn was better situated because it was located on the Wabash Road (in Blue Island now Western Avenue), which was then a part of the Vincennes trail that went from Chicago to Vincennes, Indiana. It was considerably larger and more refined than Rexford's previous venture, being a two-and-a half-story white frame building that also had various outbuildings to accommodate the needs of his guests. Because it was a day's journey from Chicago, within a few years the inn became the nucleus for a group of businesses that catered to the soldiers, cattlemen (with their herds) and other travelers who arrived by stagecoach or otherwise frequented the Vincennes trail. Events hosted by the inn frequently lasted until the small hours of the morning, requiring an overnight stay before guests returned the next morning to their homes and places of business in Chicago and the hinterland.

Through the 1970s, Blue Island's central business district ("uptown" to the locals) was regarded as an important regional commercial center, with stores such as Woolworth's, Kline's, Sears, Montgomery Ward, Spiegel and Steak 'n Shake. Today, downtown Blue Island is better known for its antique stores, art galleries, ethnic delicatessens and fine dining. Much of this shift in business activity has been brought on by "big box" development outside of town that space constraints make it impossible for uptown to accommodate. However, several local businesses have served the area for generations: DeMar's Restaurant, for example, opened its doors in 1950; Jebens Hardware was established in 1876; and Krueger Funeral Home was founded in 1858. In the 21st century, the city and a dedicated group of volunteers, working with the Metropolitan Planning Council of Chicago and the Center for Neighborhood Technology devised the Blue Island Plan for Economic Development, which addresses not only the commercial expansion of the historic uptown business district, but also the continued improvement of the housing stock and industrial base.

The Blue Island Opera House was built by Blue Island's first mayor John L. Zacharias to replace the Robinson Block, which was destroyed by the Great Blue Island Fire of that year. The opera house was host to vaudeville and repertoire shows until 1913, when it became the Grand Theater and a venue for motion pictures. In later years the building was home to the Blue Island Sun-Standard newspaper and Kline's Department Store. Although the auditorium has been remodeled out of existence, the building, with its award-winning exterior restoration, today provides both commercial and office space to the historic "uptown" district. The building has been designated as a landmark by the Blue Island Historic Preservation Commission It was designed by the American/Canadian architect Hugh Griffith Jones, who also designed Blue Island's first Greenwood School (demolished) and a commercial building with a flat above (c. 1895, extant, also now a city landmark) for Albert and Emma Schmidt at 312 (now 13022) Western Avenue. The architect's drawings for the opera house were used by Jones in the package he prepared to justify his successful application for membership in the Royal Architectural Institute of Canada.

Moraine Valley Community College operates a satellite facility uptown.

=== The Blue Island Market ===
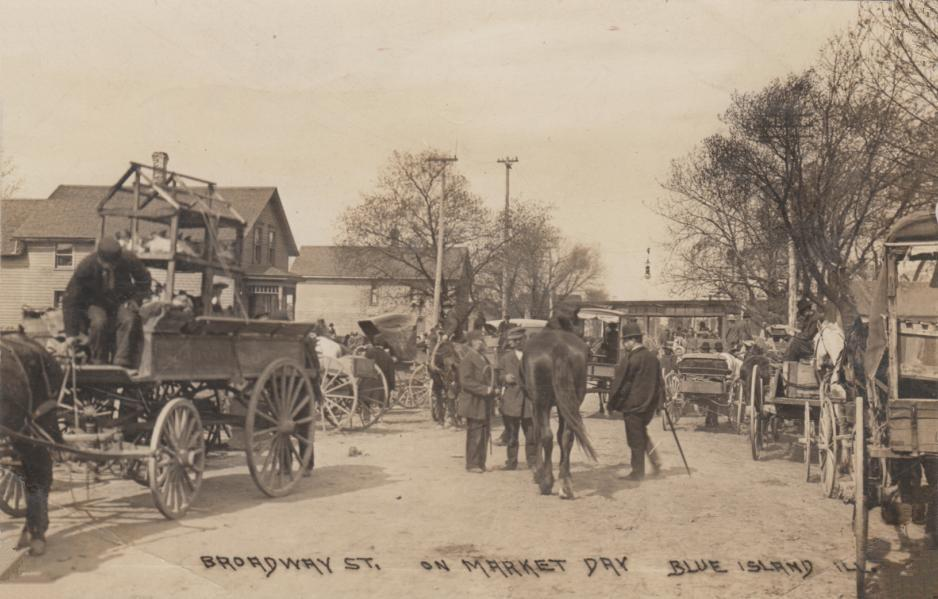
The Blue Island Market, circa 1915, looking west on Broadway from Western Avenue.

For many years on the first Thursday of every month, Western Avenue south of the canal and to the city limits on 139th Street was host to an open-air market, the Blue Island Market, more commonly known as Market Day. The market was a place where farmers from a wide area surrounding Blue Island came to town to sell their wares to each other and to the public at large. As the postcard image to the right shows, items offered included produce, farm equipment, and livestock, with a local band thrown in to provide entertainment. Market Day began sometime in the last quarter of the 19th century and lasted until May 1924, when it was closed by the city council after a gradual influx of peddlers offering shoddy merchandise discouraged farmer participation and the market was deemed a public nuisance.

=== Brickyards ===
After it was discovered in the early 1850s that rich deposits of clay surrounded the ridge, Blue Island became the center of a significant brick-making industry that lasted for over a century. In the early years, these efforts were small, with the bricks being made by hand and the turnout created mostly for local use, but by 1886 the Illinois Pressed Brick Company (organized in 1884) was employing about 80 men and using "steam power and the most approved machinery", which allowed them to produce 50,000 bricks per day. By 1900, the Clifton Brickyard alone—which had opened in 1883 under the name of Purington at the far northeast corner of the village—was producing 150,000,000 bricks a year. In 1886, the Chicago architectural firm of Adler and Sullivan designed a large complex for the Wahl Brothers brickyard (the main building of which was 250 by 350 feet (76 by 107 m)) on the west side of the Grand Trunk tracks south of 123rd street. These buildings had been demolished by 1935, and all of Blue Island's brickyards were re-purposed by the latter part of the mid-20th century. The larger ones for a while become landfills, and Illinois Brick Company's yard 22 is now the site of the Meadows Golf Club.

=== The Portland question ===
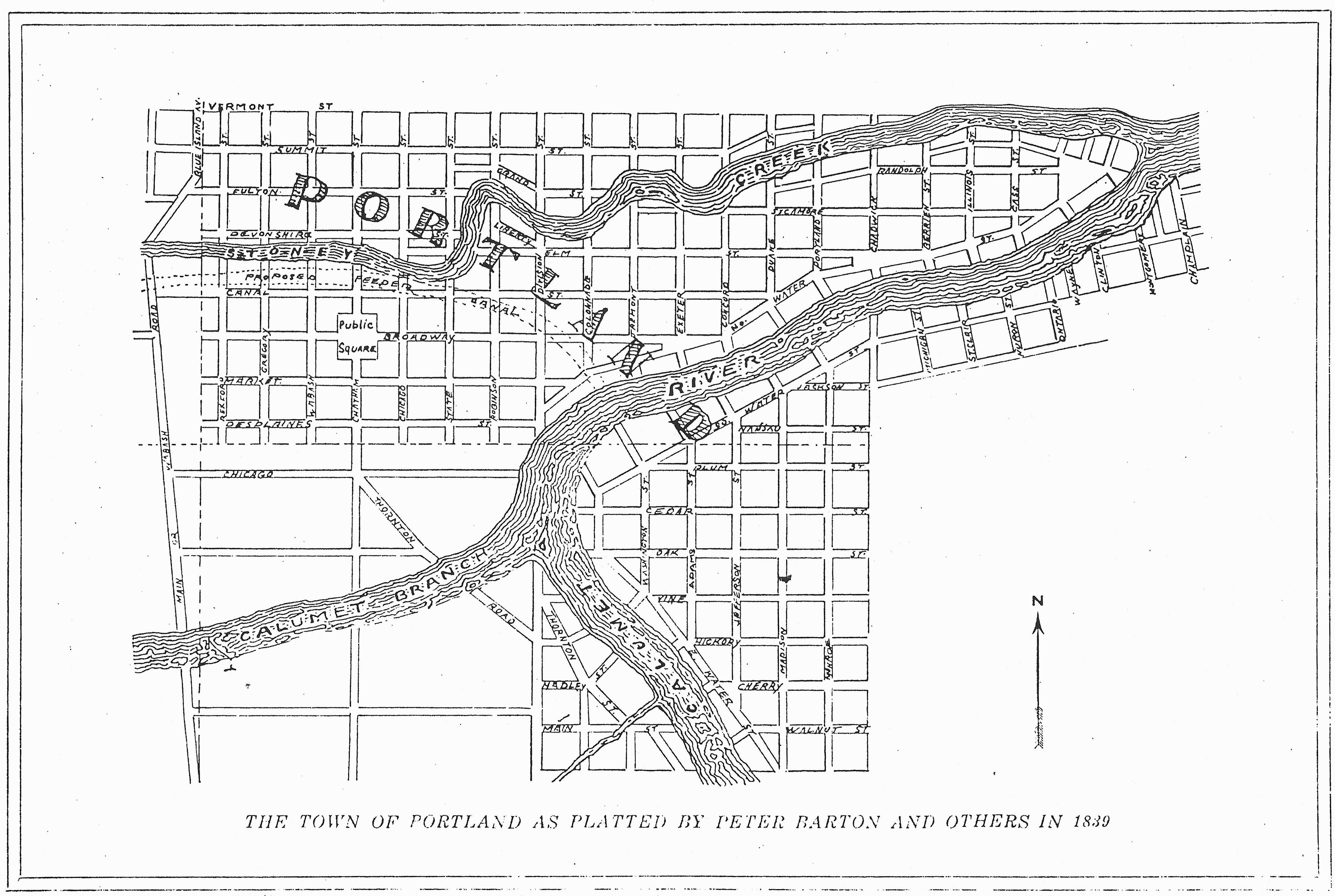
This sketch was derived from the plat of Portland which was registered by Peter Barton with the state of Illinois on April 13, 1839. More information Barton hoped to develop Portland as an important river town. "It was thought that the lake commerce by the Calumet and the inland commerce by the feeder, which was planned to be enlarged into a water-way equal to the canal, would make this location of wonderful commercial value. These expectations were never to be realized, however, as the construction of the railroads spoiled these early calculations. The Rock Island swung its line away from the river and built its depot close to the hill, and Portland was forgotten." Most of the streets shown east of Division Street and all of those shown on the eastern bank of the Calumet River do not exist to this day, and several of those that were constructed elsewhere deviate significantly from the way they are charted here. The section of Portland north of the township boundary line (the phantom line in the middle of the map) and west of Division Street was included within the boundaries of the village when Blue Island incorporated as a village in 1872.

Some sources state that the city of Blue Island was once officially (or commonly) known as Portland. This claim is erroneous.

- Norman Rexford became the community's first permanent resident when he established the "Blue Island House" at the southern edge of the ridge in November 1836, where in 1838 he became the settlement's first postmaster. In his reminiscences published in the Blue Island Standard in 1876, Heber Rexford (who first came to the area in 1834 and was Cook County treasurer at the time of the Great Chicago Fire in 1871) related the following:

"The north end of the bench of land on which Blue Island stands was originally covered with a dense forest, and from Chicago, before the view was obstructed by buildings, this timber presented a blue appearance like smoke. Water was like-mirrored forth by the mirage which almost always prevailed, giving the timber the appearance of land surrounded by water, and it was from this circumstance that the hunters called it Blue Island, which name was perpetuated by my brother getting a Post Office located there, which was also called Blue Island – so much for the name."

- On April 13, 1839, Peter Barton and his partners (who included Gurdon Hubbard and John H. Kinzie) registered the plat of "Portland" with the state of Illinois. Portland had been laid out on land purchased from the federal government adjacent to the settlement of Blue Island which was situated south of Vermont Street (more or less) and east of Wabash Road (what is now Western Avenue uptown, again, more or less). The Little Calumet River ran through the center of the platted area, and its promoters felt with this advantage that it would become a prosperous river town. They used their influence to have the local post office name changed from Blue Island to Portland (a circumstance that as time went by would be a source of aggravation to the people of Blue Island), and on May 1, 1839, this was accomplished. The post office, however, wasn't located within the platted area of Portland since there were no buildings in which to operate it, but in fact was on contiguous property to the west at the Blue Island House. Portland was never incorporated – it existed for many years by and large only as a plat of survey. No buildings of any consequence were erected there for nearly half a century. While some of the street names from Portland remain (although sometimes not entirely on their original courses), any of them that were laid out (and in fact a majority of them never were) waited in most cases for many years until they were needed. About half of the area was eventually annexed within what would become the corporate boundaries of Blue Island as time went by, and significant other sections of it became parts of the villages of Calumet Park and Riverdale, the Joe Louis the Champ golf course, and unincorporated Calumet Township. According to John Volp, whose family had lived in Blue Island since 1862:

"'Portland' did not become a river town. Neither did the name 'Portland' ever come into general use. In spite of all the efforts of its promoters to popularize the locality the people preferred to live on top of the hill and call the place 'Blue Island'..."

- For reasons that remain unclear (but most likely because all of the development that was taking place in the area was occurring in the as yet unincorporated settlement of Blue Island to the north and west), the state legislature changed the name of the platted "town" of Portland to correspond with that of its neighbor. From the Laws of Illinois – 1842 and 1843:

"An Act entitled AN ACT TO CHANGE THE NAME OF PORTLAND IN COOK COUNTY TO THE NAME OF BLUE ISLAND: Be it enacted by the People of the State of Illinois, represented in the General Assembly that the name of the place called Portland in Cook County, Illinois is hereby altered and changed to Blue Island and the same shall hereafter always be known and called by such name of Blue Island. Approved February 24, 1843."

At the same time, the post office department in Washington, D.C. changed the name of the post office to "Blue Island". In the 1903 edition of Blue Book for the State of Illinois, the state shows 1843 as the year Blue Island was granted "incorporation under special acts", recognizing the existence of Portland, but not as an incorporated entity. (Blue Island would not officially incorporate for almost another three decades – see below.)

- On April 20, 1850, the post office name was changed to "Worth", this time to coincide with the name of the township in which it was located.
- The Rock Island Railroad inaugurated service to the community in 1852. From the Chicago Journal, May 27, 1852:

"The work of laying ties upon this Road (sic) between Chicago and Blue Island will be commenced next week. Mr. H. Fuller... will complete the work in the course of ten or fifteen days. Two hundred and thirty-six men are now employed on it."

The "Rocket", as the train was called, pulled into the Vermont Street station (the only one in town then) for the first time on October 10, 1852. The Rock Island called the station "Blue Island".

- On January 10, 1860, the post office name reverted again to "Blue Island".
- On October 26, 1872, Blue Island incorporated as a village using the name by which it has always been known. Although about twenty percent of Portland was included within the corporate boundaries of the new village, that Portland was not an incorporated entity can be determined from the following excerpt that was taken from the petition that was submitted to the state to permit the election to consider incorporation: "... Your petitioners further represent that the territory herein described and bounded is not more than two (2) square miles, and that no part of the same is now included within the limits of any incorporated town, Village or City ..."

=== Historic buildings and structures ===
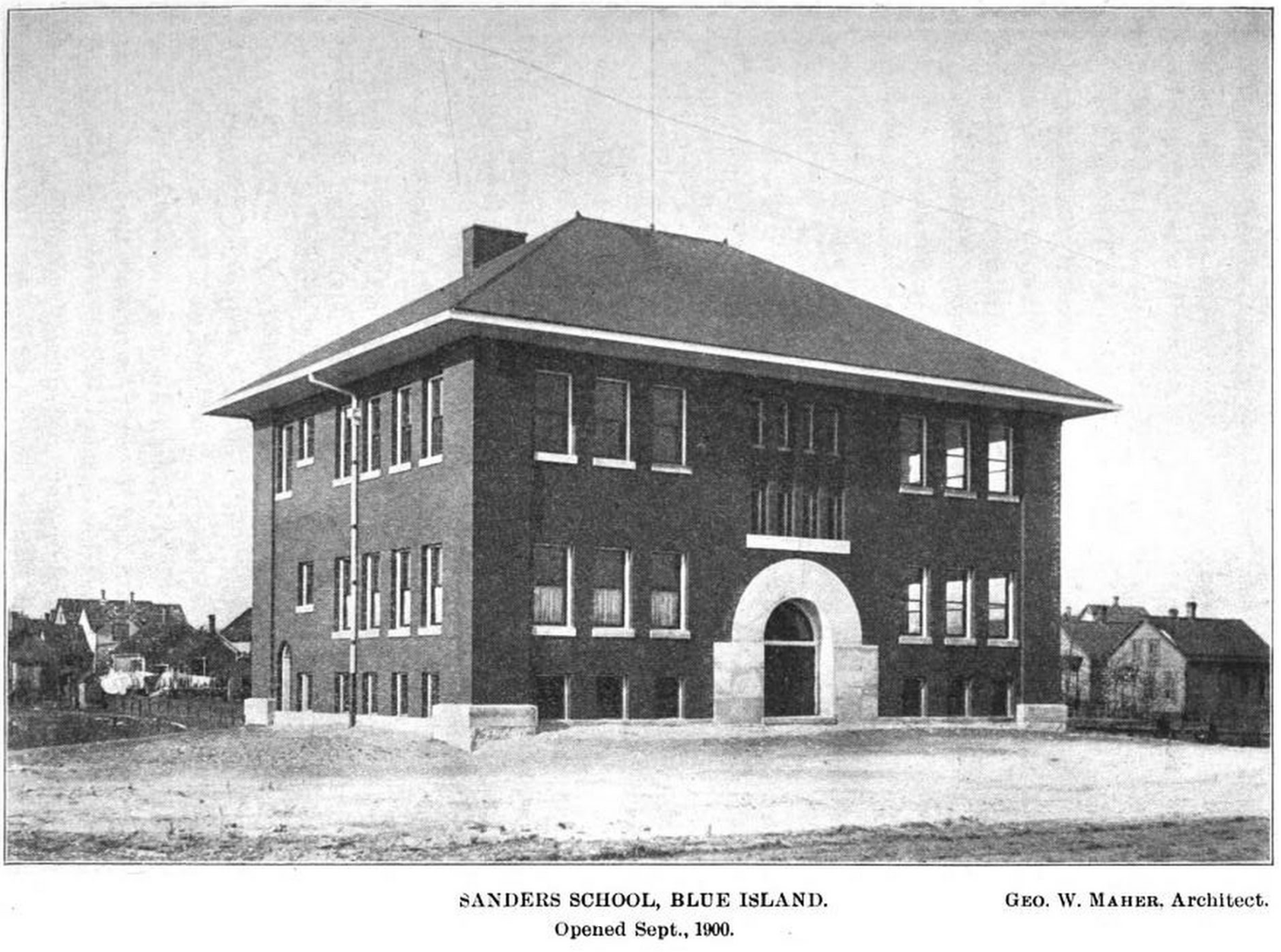
Sanders School, 1900. George W. Maher, architect

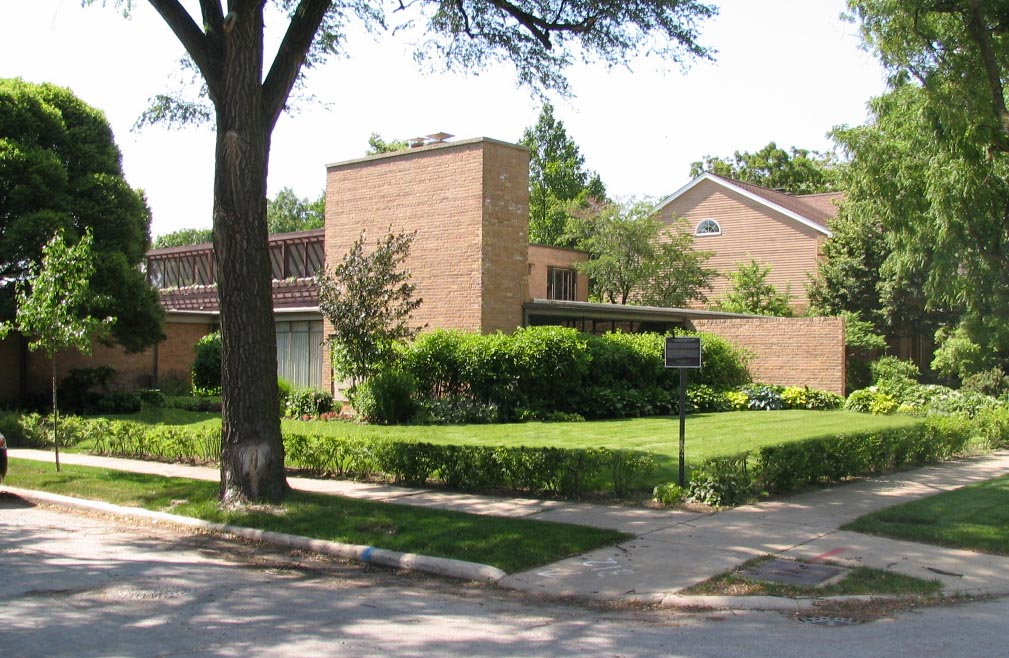
Dr. Aaron Heimbach House

Bertrand Goldberg designed the Dr. Aaron Heimbach House (1939). The house is one of only six surviving residential designs by the architect, and is a designated landmark in the City of Blue Island. In 2009, its owners received the Richard H. Driehaus Foundation Preservation Award from Landmarks Illinois for the outstanding quality of the restoration work performed on the house during the previous four years.

Because of its long history, the built environment of Blue Island exhibits a broad range of architectural styles and periods. Although largely built in the vernacular tradition, the works of notable architects, including Adler and Sullivan, George Maher, August Fiedler, Oscar Wenderoth, Robert Seyfarth, Perkins and Will, and Bertrand Goldberg, are featured throughout the community.

The Bell/Hendriks house was designed and construction in 1947 for the Prize Homes competition which was sponsored and promoted by the Chicago Tribune, and several thousand persons toured the "modified Colonial" home when it was built, with many of the visitors' comments reported in the newspaper during the month the house was open to the public for tours. Opening ceremonies were broadcast over WGN radio, and plans of the house and of the other twenty-three prize-winning designs from the competition were the subject of an exhibition at the Art Institute of Chicago the previous year.

The oldest section of Blue Island's city hall, built in 1891, was designed by Edmund R. Krause, who was the architect of the Majestic Building (along with its recently restored Bank of America Theatre) in Chicago's Loop The first buildings of Northwest Gas, Light and Coke Company in Blue Island were designed by Holabird & Roche in 1902 (demolished). The city also has 22 houses known to have been built with mail-order kits sold by Sears Modern Homes. There is one building in Blue Island listed on the National Register of Historic Places, 27 are included as part of the Illinois Historic Preservation Agency's Historic Architectural and Archaeology Resources Geographic Information System, and 41 individual buildings and one district have been designated as local landmarks by the Blue Island Historic Preservation Commission. The city's newest development is Fay's Point, a gated community built at the confluence of the Calumet River and the Calumet Sag Channel on the site of the home of Jerome Fay, who had settled there in 1850.

The Libby, McNeill and Libby Building, which operated as Libby, McNeill and Libby's main Midwest processing plant from 1918 to 1968, is a prominent historic remnant of Blue Island's industrial heritage, located three blocks south of downtown Blue Island on Western Avenue.

==== The American House ====
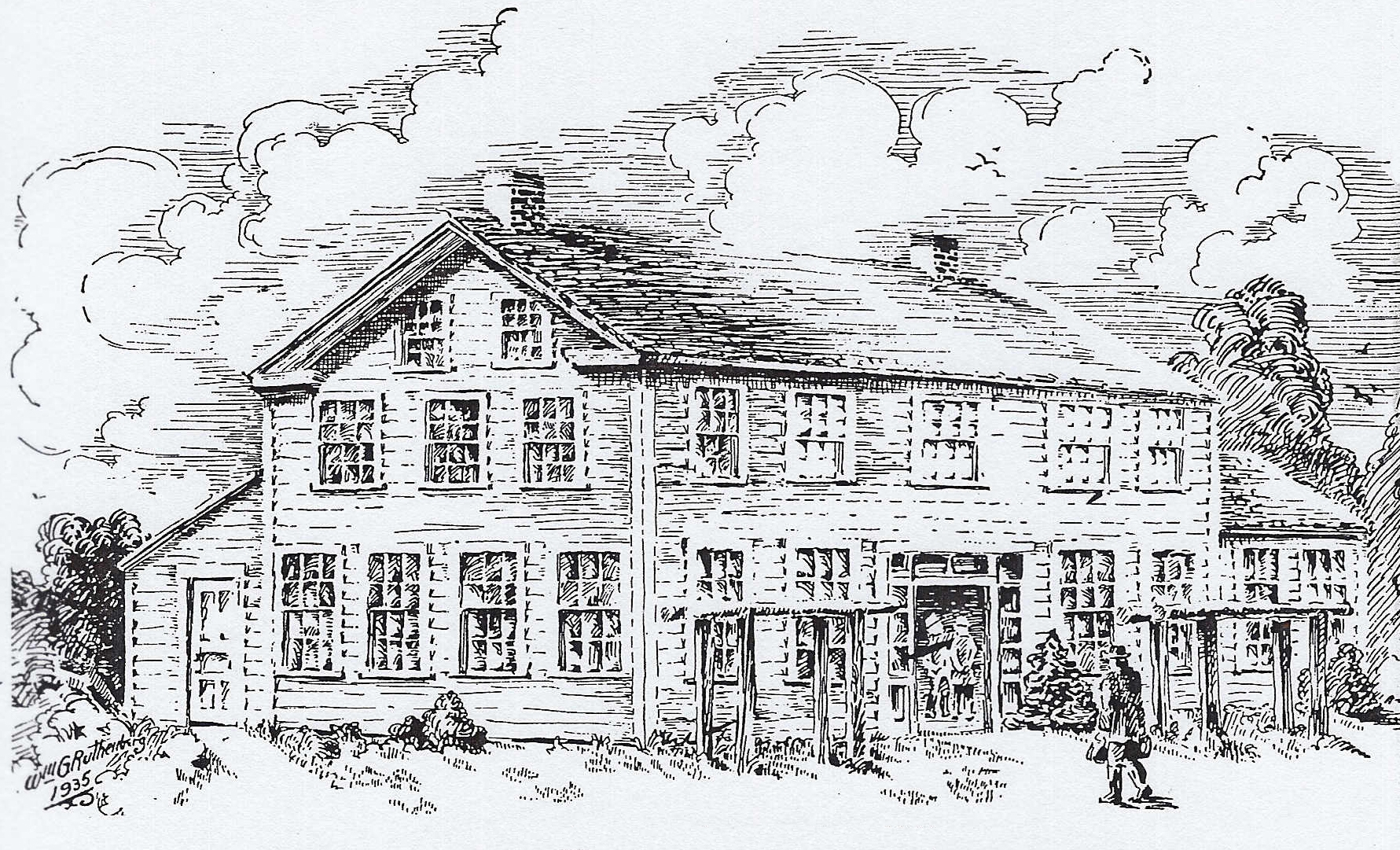
Drawing of the American House Hotel, modeled after a sketch that appeared in Ferdinand Schapper's 1917 manuscript Southern Cook County and History of Blue Island before the Civil War.

One of the oldest buildings in Blue Island, the American House was built in 1839 as the courthouse for Lake County, Indiana—a function it never actually had the chance to serve, as the county seat was moved from Liverpool to Crown Point in 1840. In 1844, the building was disassembled, sent by raft up the Little Calumet River, and reassembled in Blue Island.

Once in Blue Island, the building originally stood on the west side of Western Avenue north of Vermont Street, (where Three Sisters Antique Mall stands today). It was popular among Southerners who used it as a summer boarding house and with the contractors who built the feeder canal for the Illinois and Michigan Canal. After the Civil War it was used as a home for retired soldiers. Although it was built after the invention of balloon framing, the building is constructed using the timber framing method, evidence of which is still clearly visible in the basement and attic. However, while its Greek Revival roots are discernible, the building is much remodeled and serves today as a private residence.

Greek Revival was the architectural style of choice in the early years of Blue Island's history. Many of the buildings that remain from those days have been similarly remodeled, but some of the most well-preserved examples of the style, albeit in a vernacular form, can be seen either in the Walter P. Roche House on York Street or the Henry Schuemann House on Western Avenue.

When the American House was dismantled in the 1890s, Jacob Link cut and relocated half of it to its current location on Collins Street, where he converted it into a residence.

==== The Joshua P. Young House ====
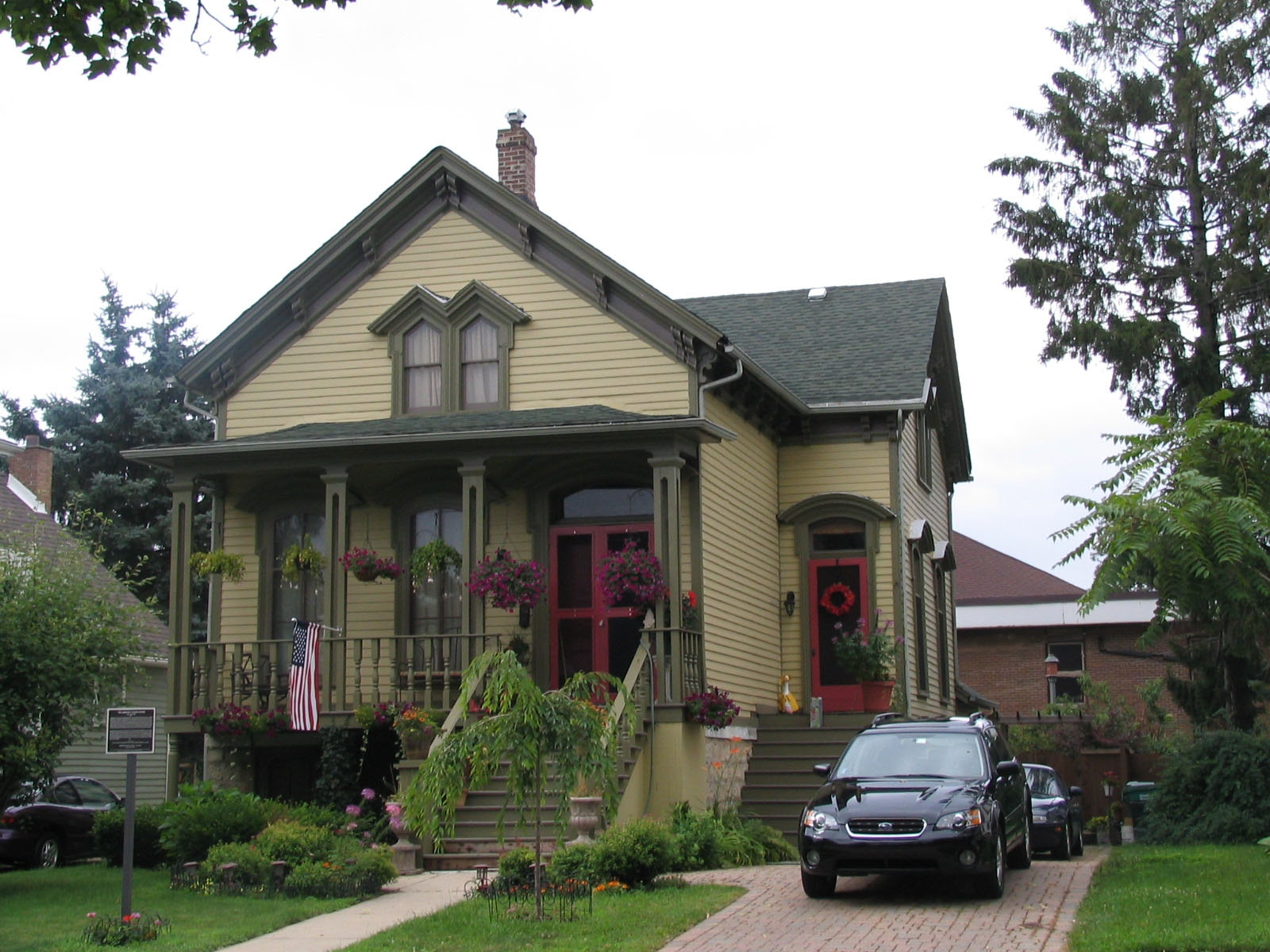
The Joshua P. Young House, built circa 1852

An ad appeared in the book Chicago and Its Suburbs, which was published in 1874 in part to promote the interests of real estate developers in the Chicago area. Note the mention of the firm's holdings in Englewood, South Lawn (later Harvey), Homewood and Washington Heights (later Morgan Park), the latter of which was purchased in 1869 for $150 per acre from the 1,500-acre (610 ha) tract that was then being developed by the Blue Island Land and Building Co.

The house was built by Carlton Wadhams (1810–1891), who came to Blue Island in 1839 from Goshen, Connecticut, and farmed on land north of the village until he opened the American House Hotel (building extant) in 1844. During his time in Blue Island, Wadhams made his first fortune as the owner of the hotel and as a cattle dealer, staying until c. 1857 when he sold his holdings and moved to South Bend, Indiana. In South Bend he was one of the founders of the Dodge Manufacturing Company and of the First National Bank, where he was a director until his death. Wadhams sold the house along with all of the property on which it was located, which included the American House and all of the land between what is today Western Avenue, Maple Avenue, Burr Oak Avenue and Vermont Street to Joshua Palmer Young (1818–1889), who, by himself beginning in 1848 and in a partnership with John K. Rowley that was established in 1866, played an important role in the development of the Chicago communities of Beverly Hills, Morgan Park, Near West Side, Washington Heights and Englewood, as well as the suburban communities of Blue Island, South Lawn (now Harvey), Homewood and South Holland.

Young operated the hotel for a time and was otherwise active in local affairs. He served from 1878–1880 as the president of the village board, and was a founder of the Congregational church (now Christ Memorial United Church of Christ). He was one of the incorporators, a director and secretary of the Chicago, Blue Island and Indiana Railroad Company (now part of the Grand Trunk Railway), whose charter was approved by the state of Illinois on March 7, 1867.

The house is listed on the National Register of Historic Places and is included in the State of Illinois' Historic Architectural and Archaeology Resources Geographic Information System.

==== USS Blue Island Victory ====
On December 28, 1944, 91 days after her keel was laid, the USS Blue Island Victory was launched from the Bethlehem-Fairfield Shipyard in Baltimore, Maryland. Dubbed "the Ugly Duckling of the merchant marine" by President Franklin D. Roosevelt, Victory ships were armed cargo ships that were built during World War II to transport troops and supplies wherever in the world their services were required. Of the 550 or so built, 218 were named after American cities.

The USS Blue Island Victory was a type VC 2-S-AP2, which was 455 feet (139 m) long, 62 feet (19 m) wide, and had a 25-foot (7.6 m) draft. It was equipped with a 5-inch (130 mm) gun on the stern for enemy submarines, a 3-inch (76 mm) anti-aircraft gun, and a 20 mm cannon. The Blue Island Victory served variously as a troop ship and as a cattle transport ship, and saw service in the Korean War. It was scrapped in 1972.

==== City hall ====
The oldest portion of Blue Island's city hall was built in 1891 and designed by Edmund R. Krause, a prominent Chicago architect who among other buildings designed the 20-story Majestic Theatre building in Chicago's Loop at what is now 22 W. Monroe Street (the theater, whose interiors were designed by Rapp and Rapp, has been renamed several time in the last fifty years – most recently in 2015 when it became the PrivateBank Theatre). An annex to city hall was built in 1925 according to plans by the Chicago architectural firm of Doerr, Lindquist and Doerr. The design for the annex was apparently a conscious effort to complement the post office building across the street and built using similar brick and a closely related architectural style, although not on as grand a scale. The Blue Island Post Office was designed by Oscar Wenderoth and built in 1914. Wenderoth was associated with the building of many government buildings of the period, including the Senate and House Office Buildings in Washington, D.C.

Beginning in the 1870s, the water supply for Blue Island was supplied by three artesian wells, whose water was pumped by a windmill to a 10 short tons (9.1 t) storage tank that sat on top of a 50-foot (15 m) high stone tower behind the City Hall building. The city began to receive its water from Lake Michigan in August 1915 after the water from the wells began to acquire a gaseous odor whose source was apparently the Public Service Company whose facilities were located about a quarter mile to the southwest, and the tank was subsequently removed.

=== Religion ===
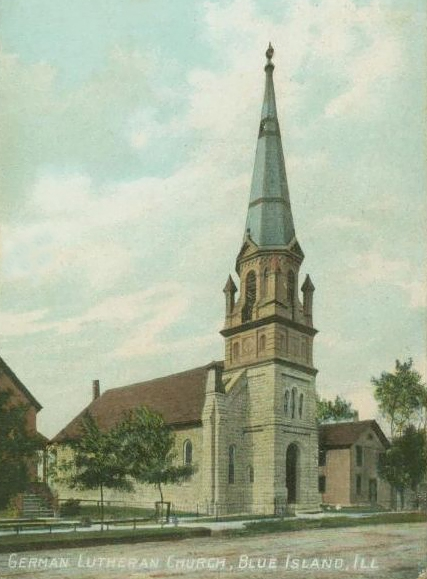
The First Evangelical Lutheran Church was founded in 1861 and its sanctuary, built in 1863, remains the oldest in the city (at least in part) by virtue of the fact that the tower and the walls of the west half of the original building were incorporated into a 1954 expansion. The school building shown to the right of the church was built in 1871 and was replaced by the present building in 1912. The former schoolhouse has been relocated and currently serves as a two-family residence.

Although religious gatherings have taken place in Blue Island almost since the community was founded in 1836, the first denominational services took place in 1850 with the founding of the Central Methodist Church (predecessor to today's Grace United Methodist Church).

=== Etymology ===
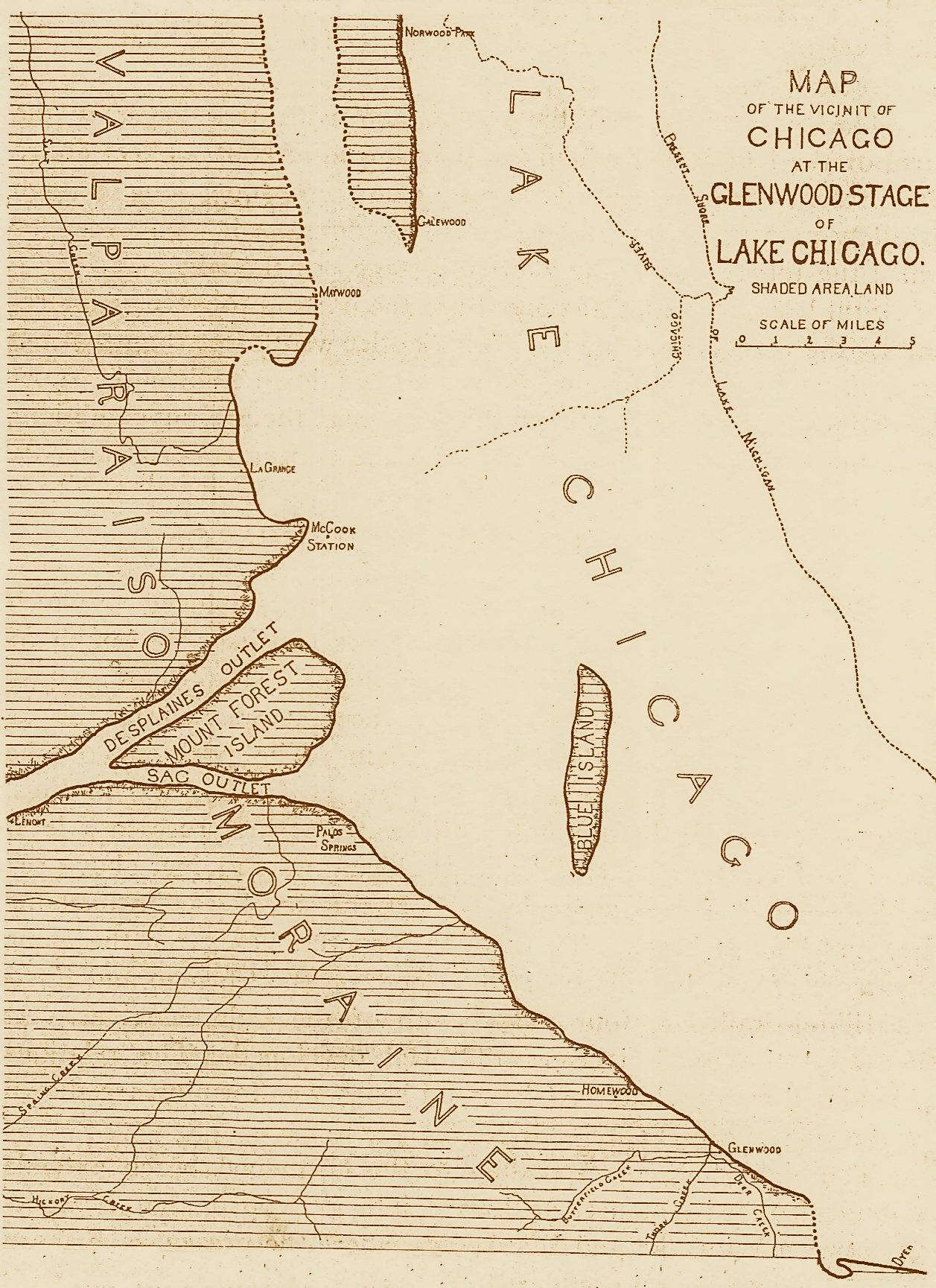
Lake Chicago at the Glenwood Stage showing the geological formation of Blue Island (middle lower right) protruding above the waters. The city of Blue Island occupies the lower quarter of the island and the surrounding plain in its vicinity.

The north-central section of the city of Blue Island is located at the south end of a glacial moraine that once was an island when the waters from Lake Chicago covered the surrounding area at the former lake's Glenwood Stage. Early pioneers gave the ridge the name because at a distance it looked like an island set in a trackless prairie sea. The blue color was attributed to atmospheric scattering or to blue flowers growing on the ridge. The Chicago Democrat, February, 1834 described it:

"Nearly south of this town and twelve miles [19 km] distant is Blue Island. This name is particularly appropriate. It is a table of land about six miles [10 km] long and an average of two miles [3.2 km] wide, of an oval form and rising some forty feet [12 m] out of an immense plain which surrounds it on every side. The sides and slopes of this table, as well as the table itself, are covered with a handsome growth of timber, forming a belt surrounding about four or five thousand acres of beautiful table land. In summer, the plain is covered with luxurious herbage. It is uninhabited, and when we visited it, from its stillness, loneliness, and quiet, we pronounced it a vast vegetable solitude. The ridge, when viewed from a distance, appears standing in an azure mist of vapor, hence the appellation 'Blue Island'."

== Geography ==
According to the 2021 census gazetteer files, Blue Island has a total area of 4.16 square miles (10.77 km^{2}), of which 4.07 square miles (10.54 km^{2}) (or 97.93%) is land and 0.09 square miles (0.23 km^{2}) (or 2.07%) is water.

=== Surrounding areas ===
Chicago
Alsip Chicago
Alsip / Robbins Calumet Park
Midlothian Riverdale
Posen / Dixmoor

== Demographics ==
Historical population
Census	Pop.	Note	%±
1880	1,542		—
1890	3,329		115.9%
1900	6,114		83.7%
1910	8,043		31.6%
1920	11,424		42.0%
1930	16,534		44.7%
1940	16,638		0.6%
1950	17,622		5.9%
1960	19,618		11.3%
1970	22,629		15.3%
1980	21,855		−3.4%
1990	21,203		−3.0%
2000	23,463		10.7%
2010	23,706		1.0%
2020	22,558		−4.8%
U.S. Decennial Census; 2010 2020

=== Racial and ethnic composition ===
Blue Island city, Illinois – Racial and ethnic composition Note: the US Census treats Hispanic/Latino as an ethnic category. This table excludes Latinos from the racial categories and assigns them to a separate category. Hispanics/Latinos may be of any race.
Race / Ethnicity (NH = Non-Hispanic)	Pop 2000	Pop 2010	Pop 2020	% 2000	% 2010	% 2020
White alone (NH)	8,498	4,990	3,442	36.22%	21.05%	15.26%
Black or African American alone (NH)	5,599	7,173	6,817	23.86%	30.26%	30.22%
Native American or Alaska Native alone (NH)	40	42	38	0.17%	0.18%	0.17%
Asian alone (NH)	78	79	86	0.33%	0.33%	0.38%
Native Hawaiian or Pacific Islander alone (NH)	6	6	6	0.03%	0.03%	0.03%
Other race alone (NH)	25	43	64	0.11%	0.18%	0.28%
Mixed race or Multiracial (NH)	318	240	385	1.36%	1.01%	1.71%
Hispanic or Latino (any race)	8,899	11,133	11,720	37.93%	46.96%	51.95%
Total	23,463	23,706	22,558	100.00%	100.00%	100.00%

=== 2020 census ===
As of the 2020 census, Blue Island had a population of 22,558, with 8,278 households and 5,457 families. The population density was 5,426.51 inhabitants per square mile (2,095.19/km^{2}). There were 9,137 housing units at an average density of 2,197.98 per square mile (848.64/km^{2}).

The median age was 35.6 years. 24.5% of residents were under the age of 18 and 11.7% were 65 years of age or older. For every 100 females there were 95.2 males, and for every 100 females age 18 and over there were 92.6 males age 18 and over.

100.0% of residents lived in urban areas, while 0.0% lived in rural areas.

There were 8,278 households, of which 35.2% had children under the age of 18 living in them. Of all households, 32.8% were married-couple households, 23.3% were households with a male householder and no spouse or partner present, and 36.8% were households with a female householder and no spouse or partner present. About 32.4% of all households were made up of individuals and 10.3% had someone living alone who was 65 years of age or older.

There were 9,137 housing units, of which 9.4% were vacant. The homeowner vacancy rate was 2.4% and the rental vacancy rate was 6.6%.

Racial composition as of the 2020 census
Race	Number	Percent
White	5,083	22.5%
Black or African American	6,928	30.7%
American Indian and Alaska Native	436	1.9%
Asian	99	0.4%
Native Hawaiian and Other Pacific Islander	15	0.1%
Some other race	5,972	26.5%
Two or more races	4,025	17.8%
Hispanic or Latino (of any race)	11,720	52.0%

== Arts and culture ==
=== Tourism ===
==== Blue Island Area Sports Hall of Fame ====
As part of its focus, the park district serves the needs of the community by sponsoring Little League Baseball, football, softball and other sports activities. It is also host to the Blue Island Area Sports Hall of Fame, which was sponsored by the Blue Island Sun Standard and founded by its sports editor, Don Rizzs. As part of a community that is heavily involved in sports on many levels, the Hall of Fame is a repository of photos and biographies of many individuals who have distinguished themselves on the playing field, both on the local level and in the international spotlight.

== Parks and recreation ==
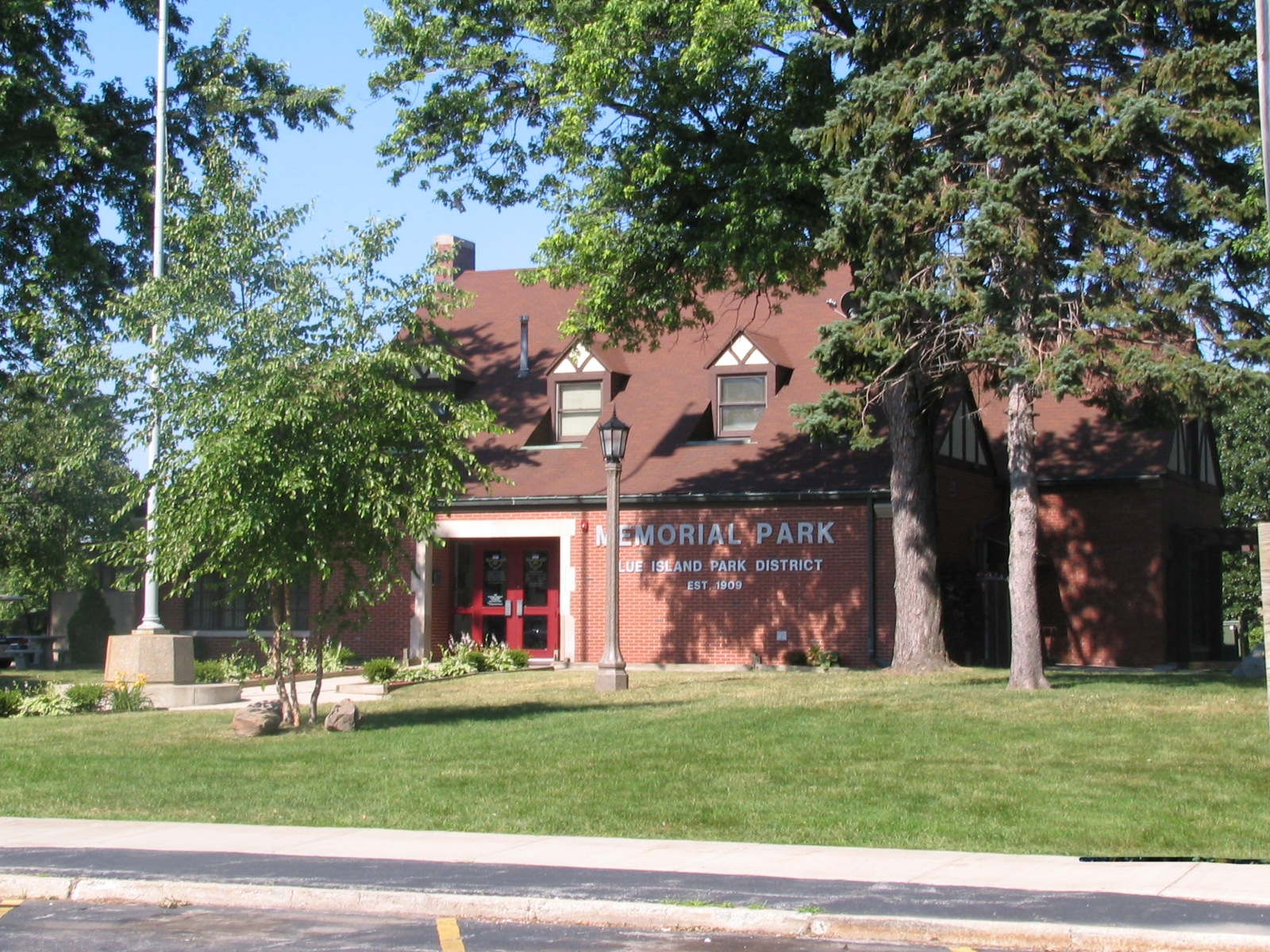
Memorial Park Field House, dedicated on Memorial Day, 1938

The park district was formed in 1909 and in 1912 acquired the property of the late Benjamin Sanders, who was Blue Island's first village president when the village incorporated in 1872 and served as the chairman of the building committee of the Cook County Board after the Great Chicago Fire of 1871. The 9-acre (36,000 m^{2}) property was laid out by the Chicago engineer V.B. Roberts with architectural work by A.R. Grosse and included Sanders' home, which was remodeled into a field house and also provided living quarters for the park's superintendent. Central Park eventually offered tennis courts, playground equipment, and the community's first swimming pool. It was vacated by the park district in 1965 when St. Francis Hospital acquired the property for $325,000. (equivalent to $3,320,000 in 2025) to build its east campus there.

Memorial Park, the city's next public park, was dedicated on Decoration Day (now Memorial Day), 1922, in ceremonies that were presided over by Brigadier General Abel Davis of Glencoe, Illinois. The section of Memorial Park running adjacent to Burr Oak Avenue with 330 feet (100 m) of frontage on Highland Avenue had originally been laid out as a cemetery in the early 1850s, when this section of Blue Island was a long walk from the populated section of the town. Although the cemetery was added to and improved in subsequent years, it was closed by village ordinance in 1898, and almost all of the remains interred there were moved to Mt. Greenwood Cemetery in Chicago, which had been developed by citizens from Blue Island. The acquisition of the entire parcel bounded by Burr Oak Avenue, Highland Avenue, Walnut Street and the B & O tracks was completed by the park district in 1935. The park at that point had reached its present size of 10 acres (40,000 m^{2}), and eventually, with the help of President Franklin D. Roosevelt's Alphabet agencies, was provided with landscaping and acquired an outdoor swimming pool, playground equipment, and an Art Deco stadium that seated 1,000 persons (demolished in December 2009). With the closing of Central Park, Memorial Park has become the flagship of the Blue Island park system.

The 8.5-acre (34,000 m^{2}) site of Centennial Park on the east side of Blue Island was acquired from the East Side Development Association in 1935 for $11,500 (equivalent to $270,000 in 2025). This park provides a field house, athletic fields and playground equipment.

The city operates the Meadows Golf Club, a 6,549-yard (5,988 m), 18-hole golf course that was designed by J. Porter Gibson and opened in 1994.

== Government ==
Government Buildings

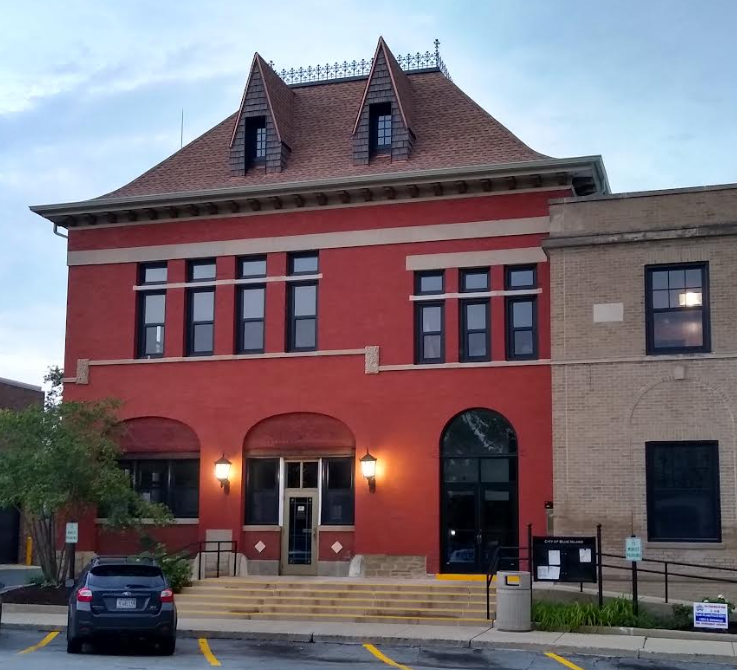
City Hall, 1891 (left) and annex, 1925 (right)

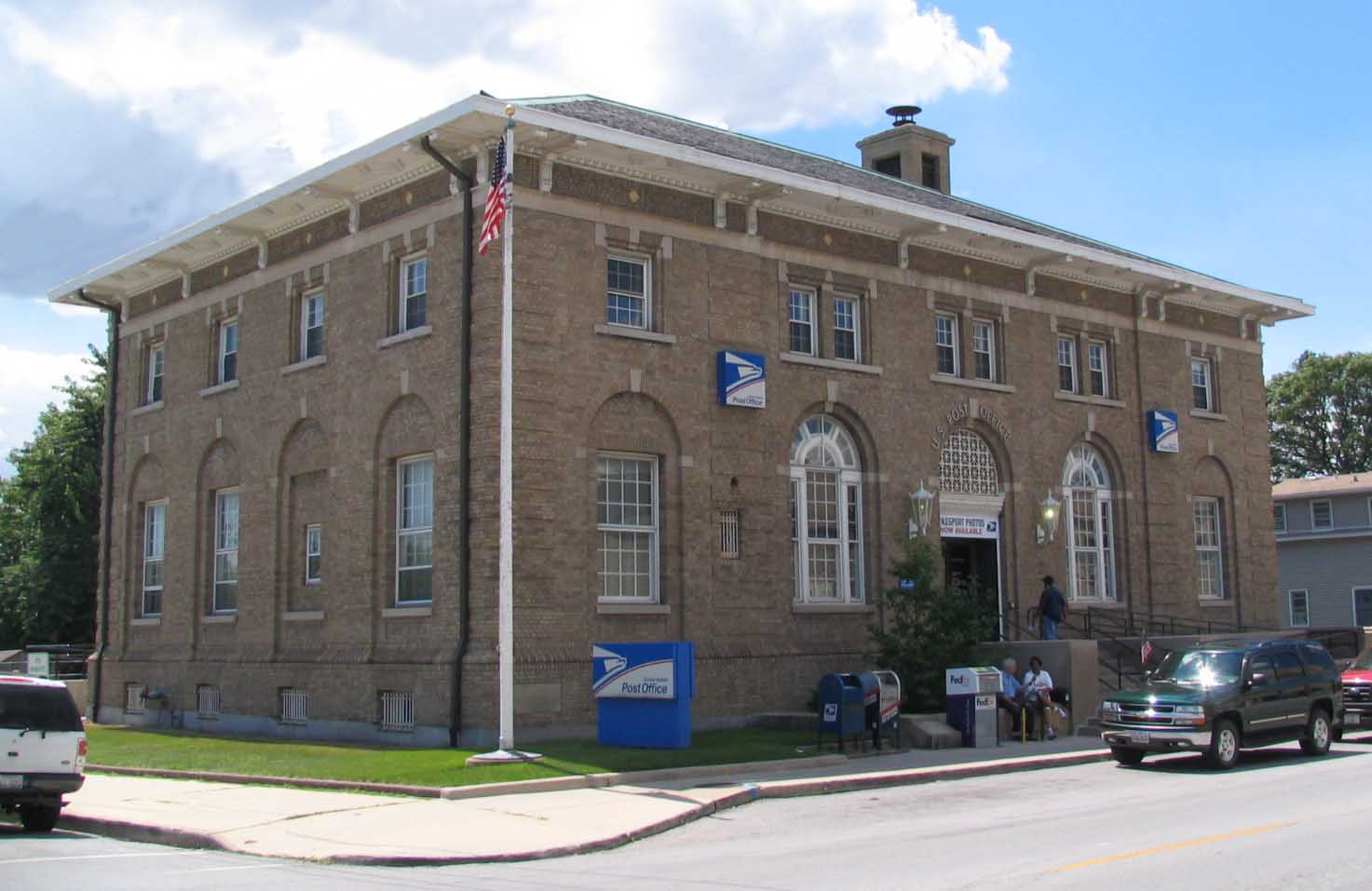
Blue Island Post Office, built at a cost of $52,285 by N.H. Shields of Danville, IL

Nearly all of Blue Island is in Illinois's 1st congressional district; the portion east of Interstate 57 is in the 2nd district.

== Education ==
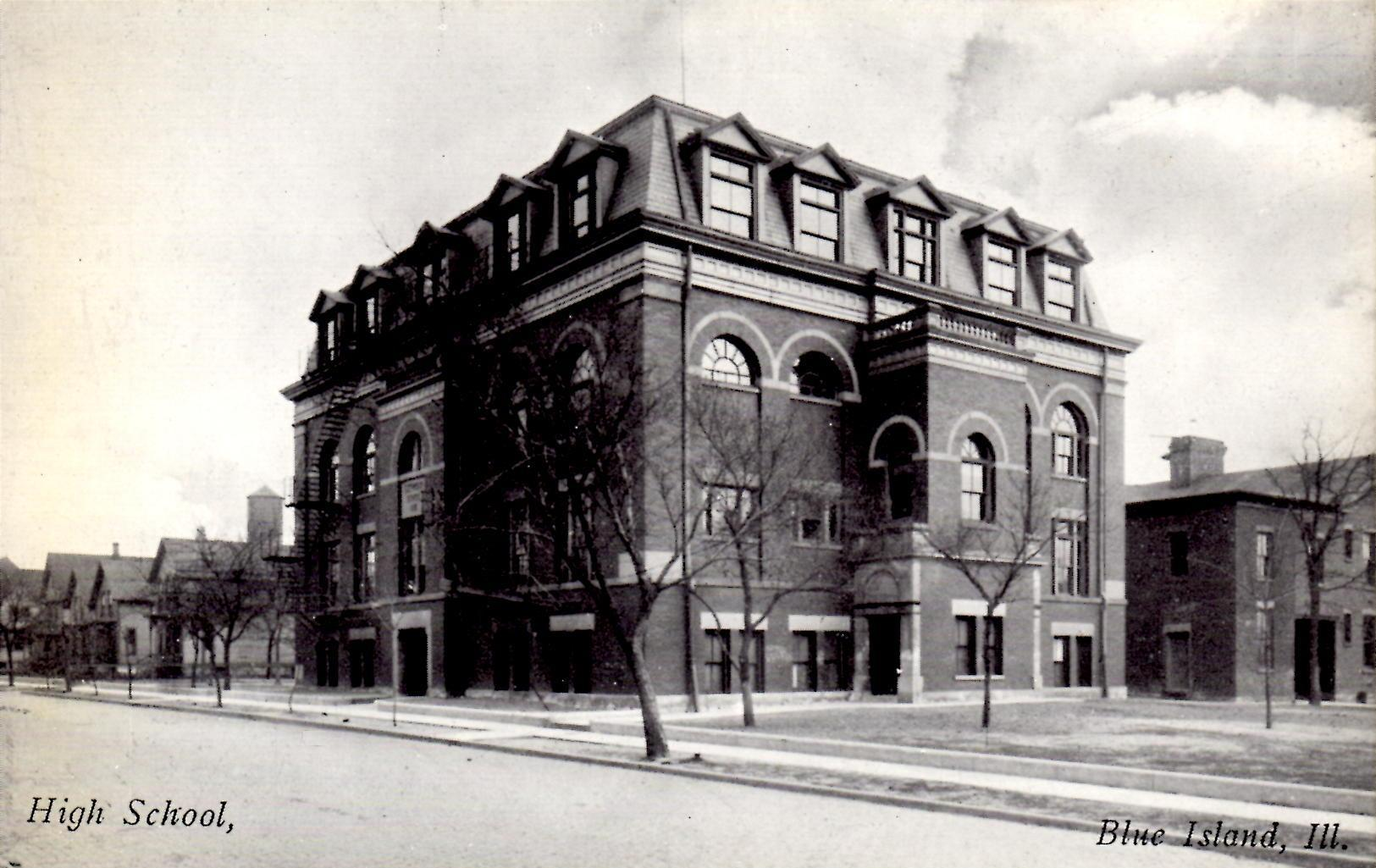
Seymour School, designed by the Chicago architectural firm of Beers, Clay and Dutton and opened in 1892 at a cost of $35,000, was demolished to make room for a new building erected in 1925

As the largest settlement in the southern part of Cook County in the middle of the nineteenth century, Blue Island was an important trading and cultural center. The village offered educational opportunity to its residents as early as 1845 in the form of a private school for girls that was operated by local citizens, and public education was introduced in 1846 with the construction of a one-room schoolhouse that served the community exclusively for that purpose until the first Whittier School was built in 1854. The one-room schoolhouse was repurposed several times in subsequent years and still stands, much remodeled, as a comfortable house on Greenwood Avenue.

Blue Island hosted a number of educational conferences during the 1850s, and because of this (and through the influence of Benjamin Sanders, whose tenure with the Cook County Board was during that time) Chicago State University was founded in Blue Island in 1867 as the Cook County Normal (or Teacher's) School in the classrooms of the old Whittier School building on Vermont Street. This arrangement lasted until 1870, when the new campus for the college was completed in what is now the Englewood neighborhood of Chicago on 10 acres (40,000 m^{2}) of land that was donated by L. W. Beck for the purpose in 1868.

The public school district as a legal entity (now Cook County School District 130) was established in 1887, and the current high school district (Community High School District 218) was created in 1927, replacing earlier versions from 1897 and 1903. Blue Island Community High School (now Dwight D. Eisenhower High School) was accredited by the North Central Association of Colleges and Secondary Schools (now North Central Association – Commission on Accreditation and School Improvement) in 1899. As president of Columbia University, Eisenhower was the keynote speaker at the dedication of the new facility on Sacramento Avenue for Blue Island Community High School in 1951, and the building was renamed in his honor in 1962.

A portion of Blue Island is within the Posen-Robbins School District 143½.

=== Elementary and middle schools ===
Most residents of Blue Island live within the boundaries of Cook County School District 130. The grade school district serves not only Blue Island, but also much of Crestwood, some of Robbins and a fraction of Alsip. Residents in the far Southeast of the city have students who attend Calumet Public School District 132. There are no schools from District 132 within the Blue Island boundary.

District 130 Boundaries:

- Blue Island: 123rd Street and 119th Streets (south sides only); Westside of Division
- Crestwood: Eastside of Central Avenue; 139th Street to the Turnpike (north sides only)
- Crestwood/Alsip: 127th Street
- Robbins/Blue Island: North side of 135th Street

Name changes:

- Greenwood School → Blue Island Community High School Freshman Building →

Everett Kerr School → Veterans Memorial School (2015)

What is now called Greenwood School is not the original (which is located on the corner of 123rd St. and Greenwood Avenue)(Currently inactive)

- Blue Island Community High School → Eisenhower Freshman Campus → Everett Kerr School

Other public schools include:

- Everett F. Kerr Middle School – 12915 S. Maple Ave. Serving grades 6–8
- Greenbriar School – 12015 S. Maple Ave. Serving students in alternative placement, grades 1–8
- Greenwood School – 12418 Highland Ave Presently used as a parent education and training site
- Horace Mann – 2975 W. Broadway Serving students in pre-K
- Lincoln Elementary School – 2140 W. Broadway St. Serving students in grades K–3
- Paul Revere Intermediate School – 12331 S. Gregory St. Serving students in grades 4–6
- Paul Revere Primary School – 2300 W. 123rd Pl. Serving students in grades K–3
- Veteran's Memorial Middle School – 12320 S. Greenwood Serving grades 6–8
- Whittier Elementary School – 13043 S. Maple Serving students in grades 4–6

Private elementary and middle schools include:

- St. Benedict School – 2324 W. New St.
- St. Donatus – inactive

=== High schools ===
The public high school is:

- Dwight D. Eisenhower High School – 12700 S. Sacramento Ave.

In 1903, a high school district, separate from District 130 was voted into law by the IL state legislature. For many years (at least until 1938), the superintendent of the high school district was the same for District 130; their school boundaries being virtually identical (the only difference being the inclusion of a cemetery in the high school district!). In August 1927, the Blue Island Community High School District 218 was established. In 1916, there were 250 pupils at Seymour School who were following the high school curriculum. By 1927, the population had grown to 428 pupils despite the fact that the school was built to accommodate 250 students maximum.

There are no active private high schools in the Blue Island community, although the Mother of Sorrows High School for Girls operated from 1954 through 1983. It was run by sisters from the order of the Servants of Mary (Mantellates). There was an attached grade school that served both boys and girls and had a boarding option for students who lived there full time. Most students were boarders.

=== Higher education ===
- Moraine Valley Community College – 12940 S. Western Ave.

=== Special education ===
Public schools include:

- Able Program, Garfield School – 13801 S. Chatham St.
- Academy for Learning – 13813 S. Western Ave.

Private schools include:

- Blue Cap School – 2155 W. Broadway St. The keynote speaker for the dedication of Blue Cap in October 1967 was then-Senator Charles H. Percy.

== Infrastructure ==
=== Transportation ===
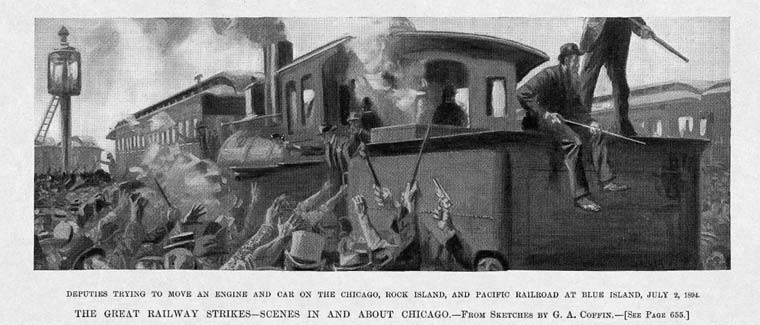
The Rock Island Depot at Vermont Street during the riots of June 29, 1894

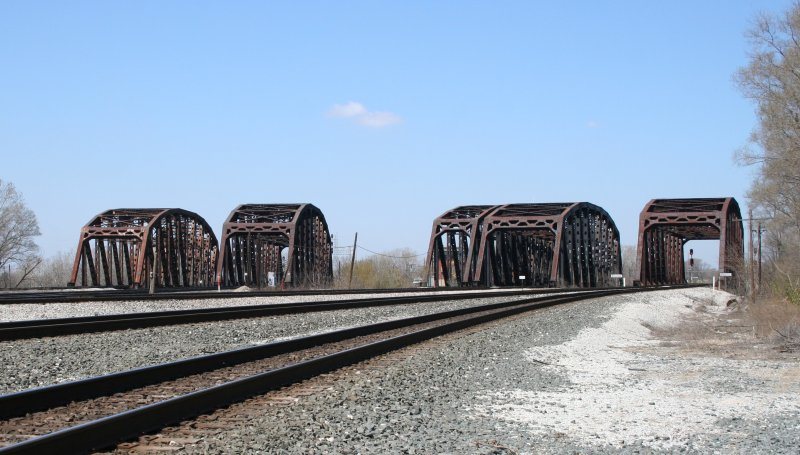
The bridges shown here span the Calumet Sag Channel and are included in the Historic American Engineering Record

==== Public transportation ====
The city is a hub for Metra trains, with six stations, four of them along the Rock Island District line: 119th Street, 123rd Street, Prairie Street, and Vermont Street.

The Rock Island District line splits at Gresham, northeast of Blue Island, and the branch, known alternately as the "Beverly", "Blue Island", or "Suburban" branch, serves the Chicago communities of Gresham, Beverly Hills, and Morgan Park. The Rock Island District uses the stations in Blue Island between 119th Street to the north and Vermont Street, where the tracks rejoin the main line, to the south. The branch line was built in 1888 as a result of efforts by the Blue Island Land and Building Company to promote its interests in what was to become the town, and eventually, the Chicago neighborhood of Morgan Park.

The Vermont Street station—which is one of the oldest in the Metra network, having been built in 1868—is across the street from the fifth station, which serves as the terminus of a Metra Electric (formerly the Illinois Central) spur line. This depot was witness to national history in a series of events that began on June 29, 1894, when rioting broke out in the Blue Island yards of the Chicago, Rock Island and Pacific Railroad after an appearance by the president of the American Railway Union, Eugene Debs, who had given a speech that day in support of the striking workers of the Pullman Palace Car Company in Pullman, Illinois, four miles (6 km) to the east. During the riot several buildings were set on fire and a locomotive was knocked off the tracks. After numerous incidents in Blue Island and elsewhere that continued through July 2, President Grover Cleveland responded by sending federal troops to Illinois to maintain the peace and to ensure the safe delivery of the mail. Troops arrived in Blue Island on July 4 and remained for several days. The sixth station, also on the electric line, is a half mile north on Burr Oak Avenue (127th Street) and Lincoln Avenue. On October 16, 2026, the Blue Island Historical Society unveiled a mural by Ricardo Gonzalez on a wall at Vermont and Irving Avenue depicting the Pullman Strike at the location where Blue Island residents took part.

Blue Island is also served by Pace Suburban Bus.

The Grand Trunk Western had a commuter line between Dearborn Station and Valparaiso, Indiana that went through Blue Island. The line closed in 1935.

==== Other transportation ====
Blue Island is 34 miles (55 km) from O'Hare International Airport and 12.5 miles (20.1 km) from Midway International Airport. It is located a half mile west of Interstate 57, one and a half miles east of the Tri-State Tollway, and is bisected by Western Avenue, which in Blue Island is part of the historic Dixie Highway that in its heyday connected Chicago with Miami, Florida.

=== Public library ===
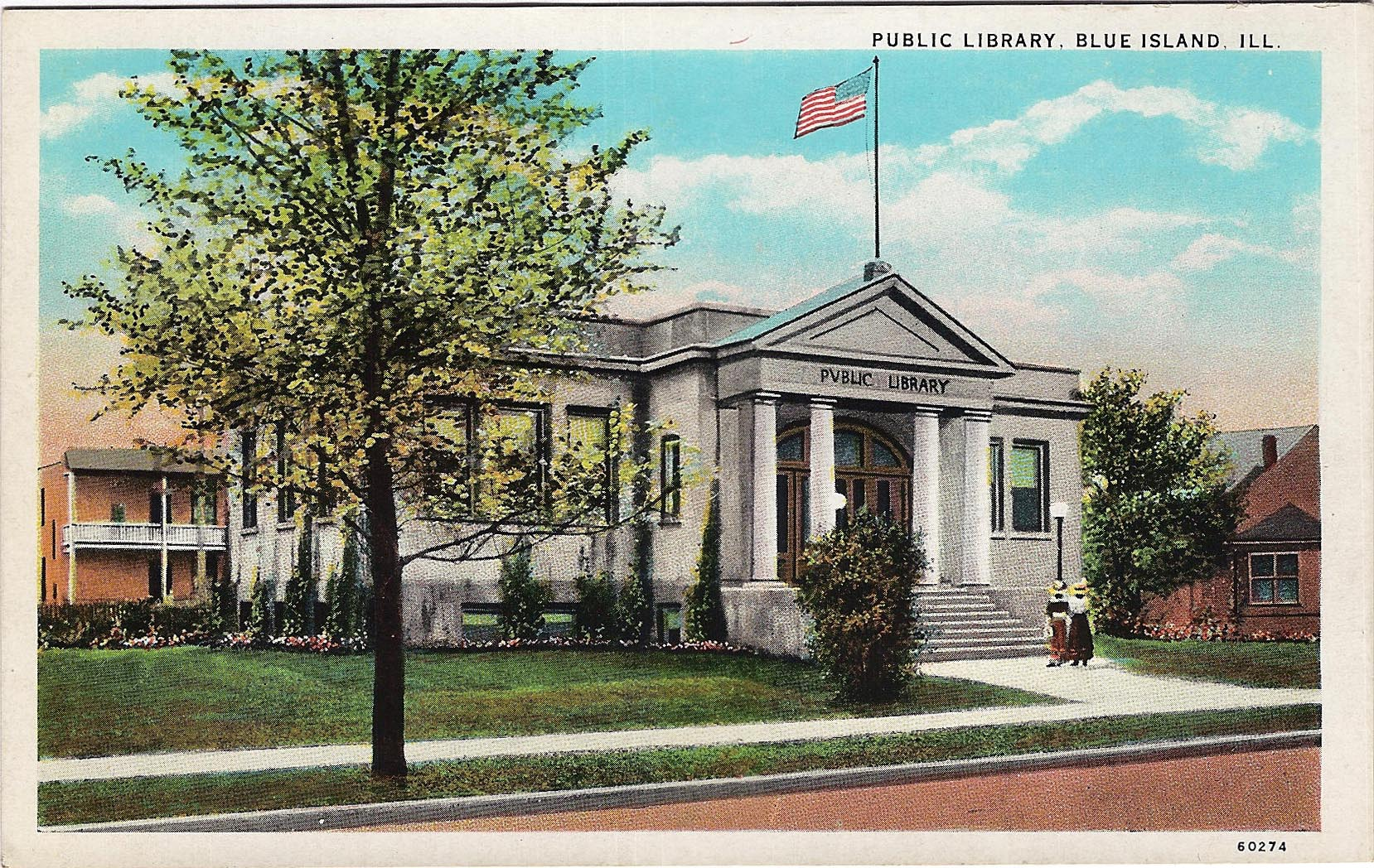
Carnegie Library in Blue Island, built 1903, demolished 1969

A lending library has been in existence in some form or another in Blue Island since about 1845, when Thomas McClintock began to make his private library of about 100 volumes available to the public for a nominal fee. The founding of the library as a publicly supported institution dates to 1854, when the library's collection, which at this time numbered around 800 volumes, was housed in the new Whittier School building on Vermont Street. The library expanded again in 1890 when the Current Topics Club, predecessor to the Blue Island Woman's Club, opened a small reading room above Edward Seyfarth's hardware store on Western Avenue with a collection of about 1,500 books and various periodicals which were acquired with funds that were donated by the community through public subscription. Except for what was in the hands of patrons, this library's collection was destroyed by the Great Blue Island Fire of 1896.

The public library as a taxpayer-supported institution was founded in 1897, and the first building built in Blue Island expressly for the purpose of housing the library's collection (by this time up to 3,200 volumes) was made possible by a matching grant of $15,000 (equivalent to $537,000 in 2025) provided by Andrew Carnegie in 1903. This building was demolished in 1969 when the current library, which opened housing the library's collection of over 70,000 volumes, was built. Today, the Blue Island Public Library provides a host of services, including multi-language reading materials, computers with internet access, public meeting rooms and a wide variety of educational programs. The library is a member of the Reaching Across Illinois Library System and is host to the Blue Island Historical Society's award-winning Museum Room.

=== Health care ===
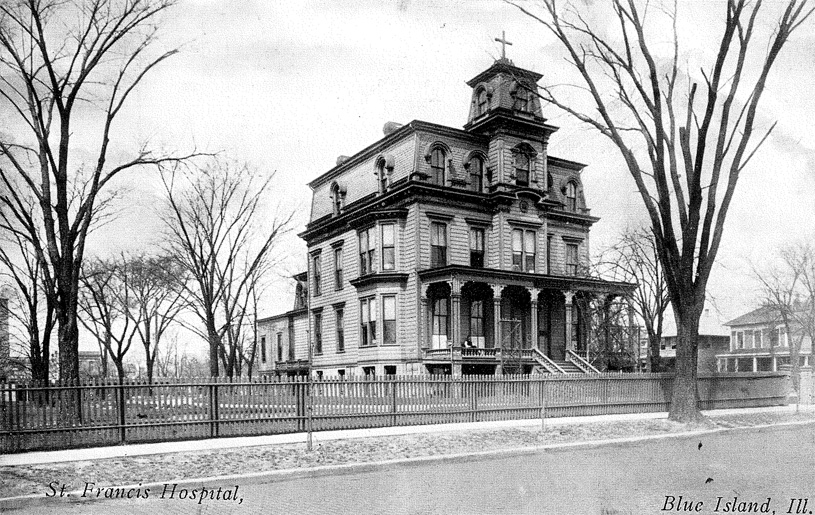
St. Francis Hospital, 1909

Blue Island was for many years home to St. Francis Hospital and its successor MetroSouth Medical Center, long nationally recognized as one of the nation's premier cardiovascular primary care centers. The hospital was founded as Saint Francis Hospital in 1905 by the Sisters of St. Mary (currently the Franciscan Sisters of Mary). They had purchased the home of the late Ernst Uhlich in 1905 for $30,000 (equivalent to $1,075,000 in 2025) and updated its systems to outfit the building for its new purpose. At the time, this section of Gregory Street was lined with churches and the homes of some of Blue Island's more prosperous citizens. The facility was outgrown immediately, and within a few weeks of opening plans were being drawn up to add additional rooms and a laundry so that the hospital could accommodate up to 30 patients. A major addition was added in 1916, at which time the house was converted to office space. It was demolished in 1948 to allow room for the next addition.

The Sisters of St. Mary relinquished ownership of the facility to MetroSouth Medical Center on July 30, 2008. In 2014, U.S. News & World Report ranked MetroSouth as one among the top 25 percent of hospitals in the Chicago metropolitan region and among the top 15 percent in the state of Illinois. Citing "low patient volume" the hospital was closed in 2019.

The campus of the former hospital occupies about 12 acres (49,000 m^{2}) in the heart of Blue Island's uptown commercial business district.

== Notable people ==
- Marcheline Bertrand, actress, mother of Angelina Jolie, born in Blue Island
- Gary Bettenhausen, 1980 & 1983 USAC Silver Crown Series Champion, was born in Blue Island.
- Peter Brown, singer-songwriter and performer, co-wrote Madonna's song "Material Girl"; born in Blue Island
- Danny Clark, NFL linebacker 2000–10; born in Blue Island
- Kris Cooke, Arena Football League player, was born in Blue Island
- Joe Day, retired ice hockey center
- John Franklin, actor and writer
- Bobby Frasor, basketball player for North Carolina's 2009 NCAA champions, was born in Blue Island
- Curtis Granderson, outfielder for Detroit Tigers, New York Yankees, New York Mets, Los Angeles Dodgers, and Toronto Blue Jays; three-time All-Star, was born in Blue Island
- Marty Grebb, musician
- Helen L. Koch, developmental psychologist who studied characteristics of twin and non-twin siblings
- Don Kolloway, Major League Baseball infielder for Chicago White Sox, Detroit Tigers
- Ted Leverenz, Illinois businessman and state legislator
- Tony Lovato, musician in band Mest
- Pete Lovrich, Major League Baseball pitcher
- Douglas A. Melton, professor and stem cell research scientist at Harvard University who Time magazine in 2007 included as one of the "...100 men and women whose power, talent or moral example is transforming the world."
- Joe Moeller, Major League Baseball pitcher for Los Angeles Dodgers, was born in Blue Island
- Rob Ninkovich, defensive end for New England Patriots, two-time Super Bowl champion, was born in Blue Island
- Romie J. Palmer, jurist and legislator
- Christian Picciolini, author, Emmy Award winner, social justice activist
- Bob Pronger, NASCAR Cup Series driver and Chicago Outfit associate, was born & raised in Blue Island.
- La Julia Rhea (1898–1992), first black performer to star in the title role of a major opera company, in 1937
- Rick Rizzs, Major League Baseball commentator for Seattle Mariners, grew up in Blue Island
- Ronald Rotunda, noted Constitutional scholar, Assistant Majority Counsel for the Senate Watergate Committee, and Senior Fellow at the Cato Institute, grew up in Blue Island.
- Eugene Rousseau, saxophonist, was born in Blue Island
- Robert A. Schuller, televangelist, former minister on the Hour of Power TV show at the Crystal Cathedral, was born in Blue Island
- Robert E. Seyfarth, early 20th century architect
- Gary Sinise, actor, director, and musician
- Del Staecker, author
- Tom Toth, NFL player, was born in Blue Island
- George "Babe" Tuffanelli, mafia boss
- Steve Wojciechowski, MLB pitcher for Oakland Athletics, was born in Blue Island
- Anthony E. Zuiker, creator of TV series CSI, was born in Blue Island
- Chip Z'nuff, bassist and frontman of rock band Enuff Z'Nuff, raised and still resides in Blue Island

== In popular culture ==
=== Writers and literature ===
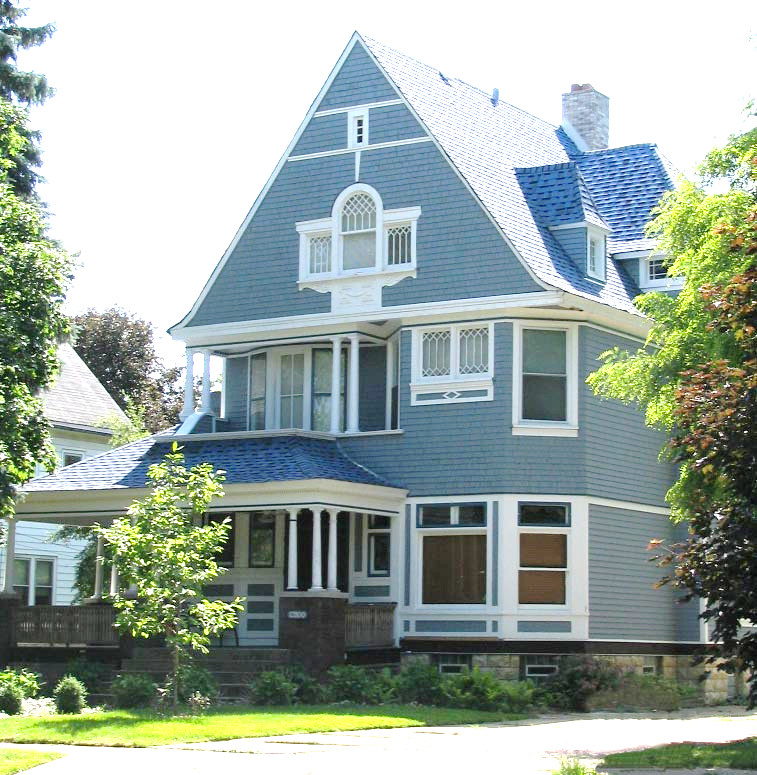
A Shingle Style house in Blue Island's "Silk Stocking" district by the architect August Fiedler, circa 1890.

Over the years, Blue Island has provided the setting for the works of at least a couple of writers. In 1935, for example, the Chicago playwright and Pulitzer Prize-winning author Margaret Ayer Barnes (1886-–1967) wrote the novel Edna, His Wife, an American Idyll, using Blue Island as the first locale of the four that make up her story (the other three being Chicago, Washington, D.C., and New York City). The book chronicles the life of the title character who spent her formative years in Blue Island but leaves after she marries, becoming increasingly unhappy as she leads a more sophisticated life elsewhere while "...remain[ing] a Blue Island girl at heart." The book was later adapted into a one-woman play by Cornelia Otis Skinner, and her opening night performance of it at the Harris Theater was enthusiastically received by Chicago society, which was pleased to "...have a chance to see a Chicago play in a Chicago theater..."

Twelve years later, Gus the Great, the Book of the Month Club selection for September 1947, was published. The book was a runaway best seller, and its author, Thomas W. Duncan, is reputed to have earned $250,000 (equivalent to $3,605,000 in 2025) in royalties from it, including $100,000 (equivalent to $1,442,000 in 2025) from Universal Studios for the movie rights. It is the story of the life and adventures of Gus Burgoyne, a circus owner of questionable character. Duncan was a college friend of Hill Lakin, the editor of the Blue Island Sun-Standard, and, after a visit to the town's industrial section, he was inspired to use it for several scenes for his book.

=== Music ===
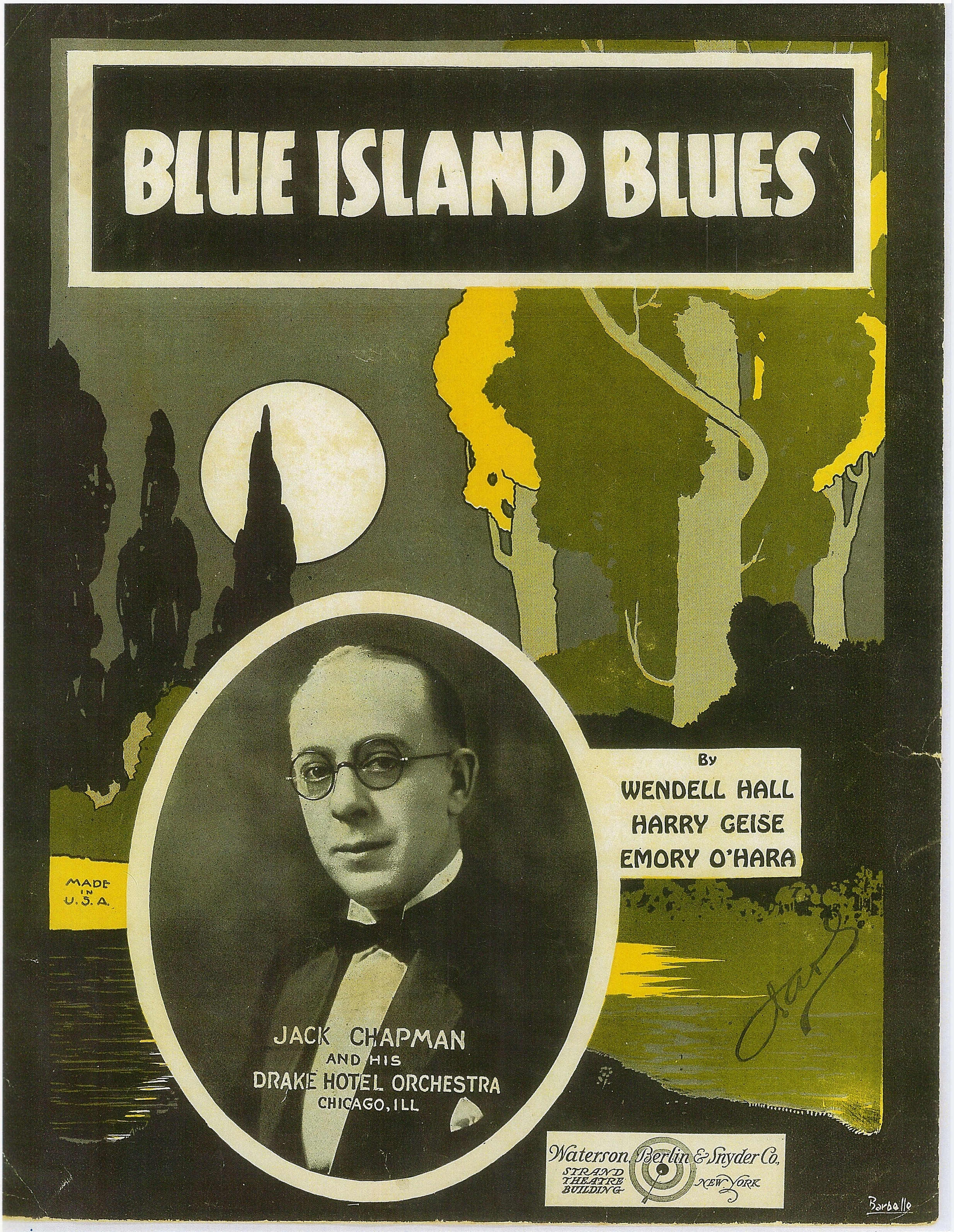
Sheet music cover for "Blue Island Blues", 1923, featuring Jack Chapman and his Drake Hotel Orchestra

Because of the wide popularity of performers such as W. C. Handy, the blues became a popular musical genre during the Roaring Twenties. It is not surprising, then, that when Wendell Hall, Harry Geise and Emory O'Hara were looking for a title for their 1923 composition, they hit upon the name "Blue Island Blues" The sheet music for it was published that year by Waterson, Berlin & Snyder Co. Described by The New York Times art critic John S. Wilson as a "striking and colorful original composition", it is a plaintive love song about a man who is missing his girl and "...has a ticket to Chicago..." that will be used to help him "... lose – those Yesterday's – Blue Island Blues". It was performed in 1923 by Hall with The Virginians on the Victor Talking Machine Company (now RCA Records) record label and again in 1929 by Tiny Parham. An instrumental version is currently available on the CD by George Shearing and Brian Torff entitled Lullaby of Birdland: Blues Alley Jazz/On a Clear Day which was released by Concord Records in 2000.

=== Television and film ===
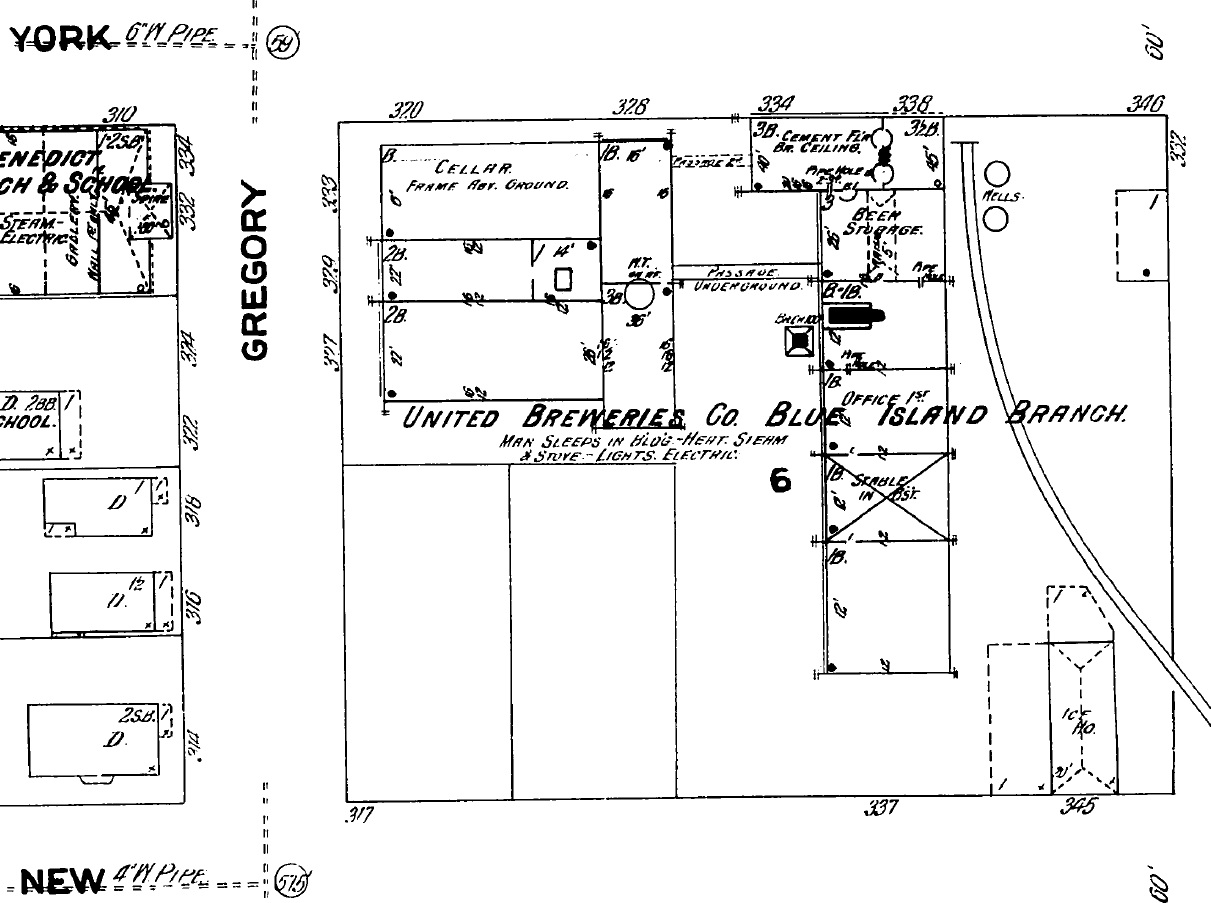
Layout of the United Breweries facilities

This layout is from a 1911 Sanborn map Founded in 1856 as the Busch and Brandt brewery and consolidated with United Breweries in 1898, this was one of four such establishments that operated in Blue Island for many years. The long narrow building marked "Stable in Bst" was afterwards owned by the Klein Elevator Co., who used it until c.1990, at which time it was demolished.

Because of its picturesque nature, Blue Island has been used for location shots in several movies and television series:

- Scenes from the 1987 film Light of Day, starring Michael J. Fox, were filmed there, including the scenes at the arcade "The Video Zone," which. for many years after filming was completed, served as a Big Boy submarine sandwich shop until it was demolished in June 2009.
- Scenes from the 2006 Paramount Pictures film Flags of Our Fathers, directed by Clint Eastwood, were filmed in Blue Island.
- Scenes from the 2008 Universal Studios film The Express: The Ernie Davis Story, the story of Ernie Davis, who was the first black football player to win the Heisman Trophy, were also filmed here.
- Scenes from the 2008 film The Lucky Ones were filmed in Blue Island.
- On October 21, 2010, leaves were plucked from trees and artificial snow fell as New Line Cinema prepared to film exterior shots for the film The Rite.

Blue Island also appeared regularly in the television show Cupid, and two episodes of the TV series Early Edition were filmed there.
