= Tuffanelli =

Tuffanelli is a surname. Notable people with the surname include:

- George "Babe" Tuffanelli (1903–1975), American gangster
- Giuseppe Tuffanelli, Italian racing driver
