= Libby, McNeill and Libby Building =

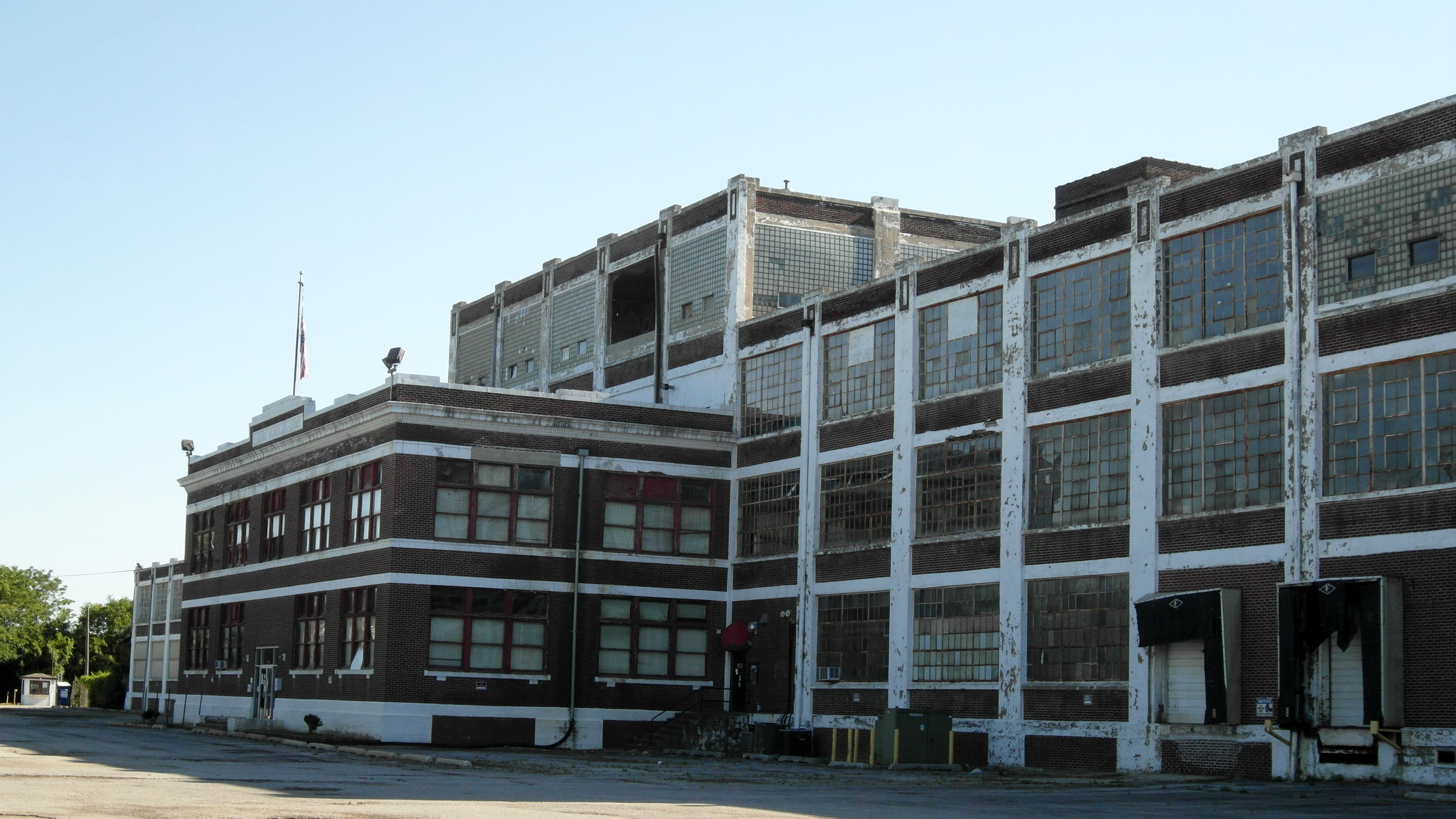
- Interactive map of the Libby, McNeill and Libby Building area

General information
- Location: 13636 S. Western Avenue, Blue Island, Illinois
- Coordinates: 41°38′42.11″N 87°40′51.24″W
- Completed: 1917-1919

Technical details
- Floor count: 4
- Floor area: 550,000 square feet (51,000 m^{2})

Design and construction
- Architect: Philip Larmon

The Libby, McNeill and Libby Building is an industrial building on Western Avenue in Blue Island, Illinois. It was designed by Philip Larmon and built between 1917 and 1919. It originally served as Libby, McNeill and Libby's main Midwest processing plant.

== History ==
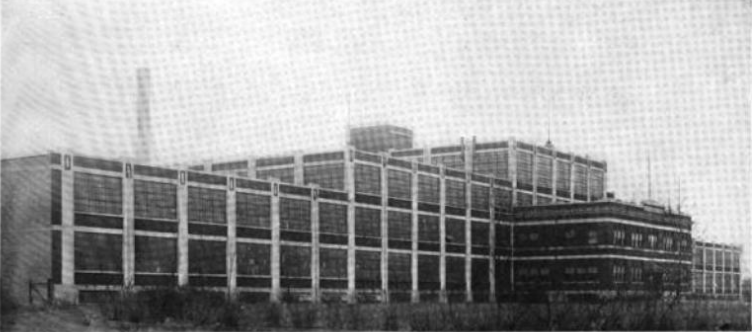
The Libby McNeill & Libby Building in 1922

The plant was built between 1917 and 1919. Situated on a 22-acre property at the Baltimore and Ohio Chicago terminal, it was designed by Philip Larmon and built by C. A. Moses Construction Company at a cost of approximately $500,000. Libby, McNeill and Libby moved into the building in mid-June 1918. The northernmost rear wing was completed in 1919, and served as the "Tomato Building", while the southernmost wing was the "Pickle Building". A wide variety of foods were canned and bottled at this plant, including pickles, catsup, mustard, salad dressing, jellies, apple butter, baked beans, and olives.

Libby's closed the plant in 1968. In the 1980s, the building was redeveloped as the Blue Island Industrial Terminal and would go on to house a variety of small businesses, including a fiberglass boat manufacturer and an electrical conduit manufacturer. In 2018, the building was donated to Affordable Recovery Housing, a nonprofit organization serving homeless people and recovering addicts. Affordable Recovery Housing organized free COVID-19 testing on the property, during the COVID-19 pandemic.

In April of 2025, the City of Blue Island took ownership of the Libby with plans to find a developer to redevelop the site into an industrial use.
