= Del Staecker =

American novelist

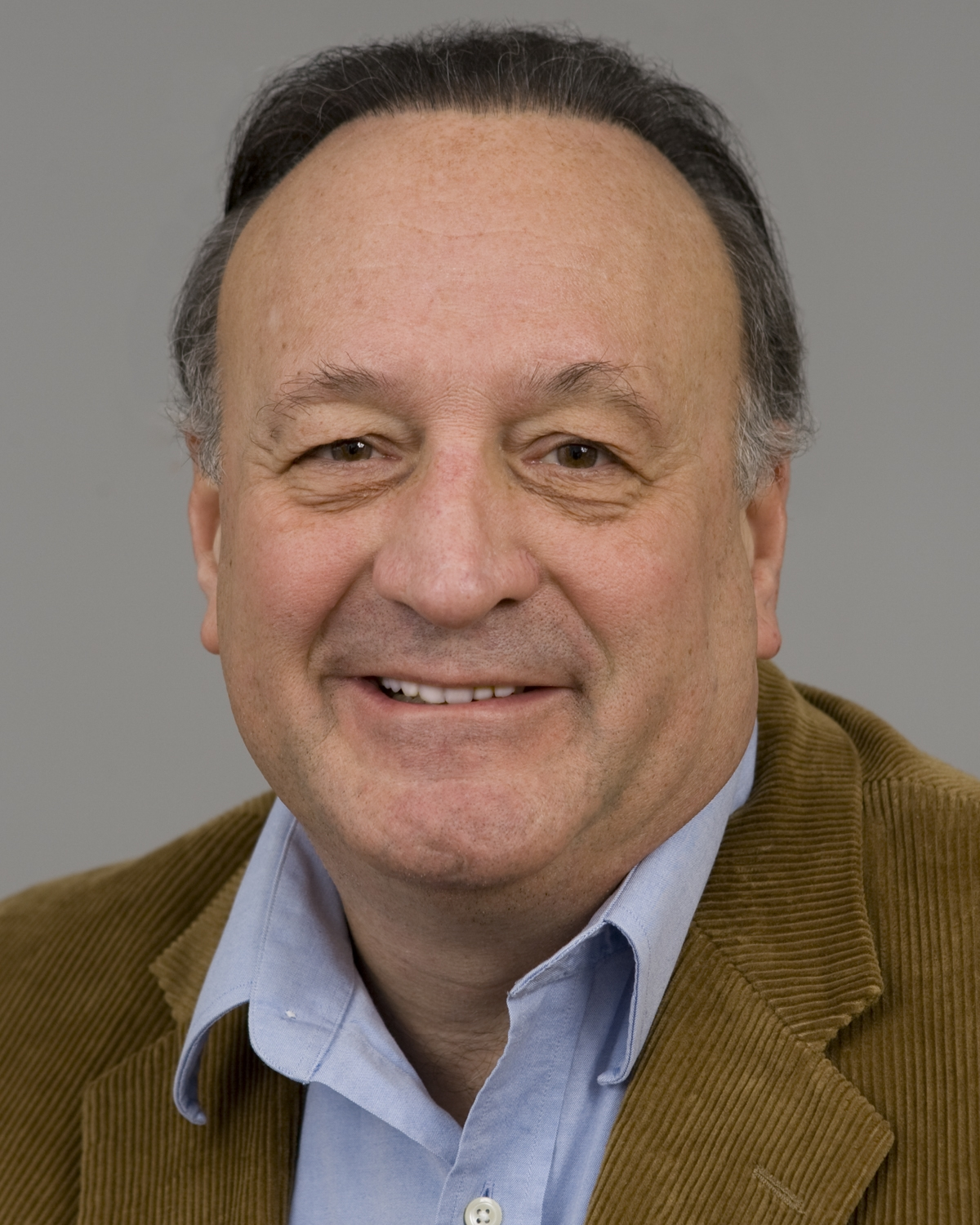
- Born: November 23, 1950 (age 75); Blue Island, IL
- Occupations: Author, speaker

Del Staecker (born November 23, 1950) is an American writer of novels, novellas, short stories and non-fiction in a number of genres, including suspense, crime, philosophical fiction, satire and memoir.

Staecker, a life Fellow of the Royal Society of Arts and a Knight of Honor in the Order of the Knights Hospitaller, is best known for his World War II bio-memoirs (non-fiction), his suspense trilogy set in Nashville, Tennessee, where he lived for many years, and his crime stories set in the South Side of Chicago, Illinois, where he was born and raised.

Both his fiction and non-fiction writings have garnered numerous awards. In 2012 he was named "Writer on Deck" by the United States Navy, and finalist for Author of the Year by the Military Writers Society of America. Nicolas Gage, co-executive producer of The Godfather Part III, said of Staecker's first book, [it is] "...as rich, complex and satisfying as the best works of Raymond Chandler and Elmore Leonard". John Seigenthaler, founding editorial director of USA Today called Staecker "a master storyteller".

== Early life ==
Del Staecker (Delmar Rey Staecker) was born in Blue Island, Illinois, on November 23, 1950, one of six children born to Irvin H. Staecker, a U.S. Navy veteran of World War II, and Dorothy Bettenhausen Staecker. His family came from farming backgrounds, and Staecker spent much of his youth milking cows, bailing hay, and doing chores on his relatives’ farms while also finding time to be a Boy Scout and play Little League baseball.

A loner, Staecker often took the train from Blue Island to Chicago's Old Town, just a few miles away. There, he visited his Uncle Erling Kjelland at his exotic bird shop, Sedgwick Studio, where beat-era icons such as Jack Kerouac, Allen Ginsberg, and Bob Dylan visited.

Staecker survived a two-year battle against leukemia at age fifteen, and his family moved him to Vero Beach, Florida, where he completed high school. Staecker went to The Citadel, The Military College of South Carolina, where he was an Honors graduate (Class of 1972). He then served in the United States Army, where he assisted with Operation Babylift, relocating children from Vietnam.

== Career ==
After his discharge from the U.S. Army, Staecker began a career in the not-for-profit sector as a development officer, focusing on raising funds for charitable organizations. During his thirty-year fundraising career, he worked for St. Thomas Hospital (Nashville, TN), The American College (Bryn Mawr, PA), and Heartbeat International (Columbus, OH) among others. He started his own fundraising consulting company in 1992 and raised the money needed to build the Country Music Hall of Fame and Museum (Nashville, TN), restore the Ringling family estate, C’Dzan, and construct the Tampa Children's Hospital.

Staecker served the nonprofit industry as chairman of the National Society of Fundraising Executives (now American Fundraising Professionals) from 1990 to 1992, and penned the industry's Donor Bill of Rights, a declaration listing universal rights of donors to charitable causes. He led the project, which included the Association of Fundraising Professionals (AFP), Association for Healthcare Philanthropy (AHP), the Council for Advancement and Support of Education (CASE), and the Giving Institute. The Donor Bill of Rights was endorsed by the Independent Sector, National Catholic Development Conference (NCDC) National Committee on Planned Giving (NCPG), the Council for Resource Development (CRD), and the United Way of America.

Tired of fundraising and looking for something to do to change his life, Staecker left the world he knew in 2006, moved to an isolated cabin near Riggins, Idaho and ran a white-water rafting company while writing his first novel. That novel, The Muted Mermaid, received positive reviews. Nicolas Gage, co-executive producer of The Godfather Part III, wrote that the novel was "rich, complex and satisfying"; John Seigenthaler (founding editorial director of USA Today) referred to Staecker as "a master storyteller". Shaved Ice, the second book in what was to be a trilogy, was published in 2008. The final installment, Chocolate Soup, was published in 2010 and described as having " well-developed, appealing characters" and "hard to put down" by Mysterious Reviews. Both books won critical acclaim, and the trilogy was described as "a deftly written masterpiece" by Midwest Book Review.

Staecker turned to non-fiction in 2009, fulfilling a promise to his father to write the story of the "Chicago boys" and their experiences on the USS Fuller, a World War II assault transport ship, that served primarily in the Pacific Theatre. The Lady Gangster: A Sailor’s Memoir received awards and accolades, and recognition by the United States Navy, which named Staecker a Writer on Deck in 2012 and hosted him on a speaking tour for American bases in the Mediterranean. A review on the Naval Historical Foundation's website called the book an "interesting and informative read of a subject not often written about".

Sailor Man: The Troubled Life and Times of J.P. Nunnally, USN (non-fiction), followed in 2015, from the letters of a sailor who served on the USS Fuller along with Irvin Staecker, Del's father. Another critically acclaimed work, Sailor Man won the praise of, among others, Underrated Reads, which said, "Sailor Man should be required reading in boot camp … in high school…somewhere!" The reviewer for the Military Writers Society of America noted that Sailor Man "gives the reader a greater appreciation for the sailor, Marines and soldiers who weathered deadly maelstroms of destruction in taking fortified Pacific Islands". The title was also named a finalist for the Foreword INDIES Book of the Year Awards in 2015.

In 2012, Staecker was invited to submit a story for a collection of crime tales. Although the collection was never published, Staecker's contribution, "Blind One-Legged Johnny", became the first chapter in Tales of Tomasewski (2013) and was followed up with More Tomasewski (2014). The Tomasewski story was further extended with (2024) "Another Southside" completing what has been called by Staecker as a "love letter to the place that made me."

Inspired by his visits to Long Beach Island, New Jersey and Ocean City, New Jersey, Staecker wrote One Good Man (fiction) in 2016 with, as found in most of Staecker's writings, anthropological insights into the nature of man and how one person can be a catalyst for good in an overwhelmingly materialistic world.

A member of the International Association of Crime Writers (IACW), Staecker has chaired the Hammett Prize Reading Committee three times. The Hammett Prize, named for Dashiel Hammett, author of The Maltese Falcon and The Thin Man, among other works, is awarded annually.

Staecker's work Job 2.0: God and Lucifer Battle Again for a Single Soul, published 2019, has been called "imaginatively thoughtful and thought-provoking..." (Midwest Book Review), "mind-boggling", "enlightening" (Military Writers Society of America), and "...humorous and inspirational..." (Underrated Reads).

Published in January 2022, Staecker's most recent work Tard is a multiformat, multigenre exploration into the spiritual response to the effects of crime. Sandra Miller Linhart, an award-winning author, called the book "beautiful," writing that she "cried so much—ugly cry, beautiful cry, inspired cry...". UNDERRATED READS said, "TARD is a unique novel and one of those literary gems that is hard to come by. A must-read!" Published in 2024, Another Southside is a lengthy compendium of crime stories linked to Chicago's Southside detective Jake Thompson.

== Published works ==
=== Non-fiction ===
- The Lady Gangster: A Sailor’s Memoir (2009) ISBN 978-1934980224
- Sailor Man: The Troubled Life and Times of J.P. Nunnally, USN (2015) ISBN 978-1555718169

=== Fiction ===
- The Muted Mermaid (2008) ISBN 978-0979949463
- Shaved Ice (2008) ISBN 978-1934980125
- Chocolate Soup (2010) ISBN 978-1934980576
- Tales of Tomasewski (2012) ISBN 978-1619373693
- More Tomasewski (2014) ISBN 978-1619373709
- One Good Man (2016) ISBN 978-1945772177
- Job 2.0: God and Lucifer Battle Again for a Single Soul (2019) ISBN 978-0310107583
- Tard (2022) ISBN 978-1943267934
- Another Southside (2024) ISBN 978-1-938505-66-9
- Reasonable Facsimile: An Anthology (2025) ISBN 978-1-938505-77-5
- Broadwalk Blues (2025) ISBN 978-1-938505-799

== Honors, decorations, awards and distinctions ==
Lifetime Fellow, Royal Society of Arts (UK)

Knight of Honor, Order of St. John of Jerusalem, Order of Knights Hospitaller

U.S. Army veteran; Operation Baby Lift

2009 Silver Medal, Military Writers Society of America (The Lady Gangster: A Sailor’s Memoir)

2009 Gold, Branson Stars and Flags Book Awards (The Lady Gangster: A Sailor’s Memoir)

2010 Silver Medal, Military Writers Society of America (Trilogy: The Muted Mermaid, Shaved Ice, Chocolate Soup)

2012 Writer on Deck, U.S. Navy

2012 Finalist, Author of the Year, Military Writers Society of America

2015 INDIES Finalist, War & Military, Foreword Reviews (Sailor Man: The Troubled Life and Times of J.P. Nunnally, USN)

2015 Gold Medal, Military Writers Society of America (Sailor Man: The Troubled Life and Times of J.P. Nunnally, USN)

2019 Silver Medal for Literary Fiction, Military Writers Society of America (Job 2.0: God and Lucifer Battle Again for a Single Soul) (Note: No gold medal was awarded for this category in 2019.)

2022 TAZ Award for fiction, The Author Zone (Tard)

2023 Finalist, Author of the Year, Military Writers Society of America
