= Edmund R. Krause =

Chicago architect

Edmund R. Krause (August 15, 1859 - July 2, 1935) was an architect in Chicago, Illinois. Krause was born in Thorn in the German Empire and moved to Chicago in 1885.

He married Lara A. Faber in 1887 and married Katherine Davis in 1891, becoming parents to Edmund F. and Lydia F. in the latter marriage. It is not known whether his first wife died or they divorced. Apart from a short partnership with Frederick W. Perkins in 1896, he mostly worked as a sole practitioner. He lived in Edgewater, including a lengthy stay at the Edgewater Beach Hotel, and for six years in Evanston.

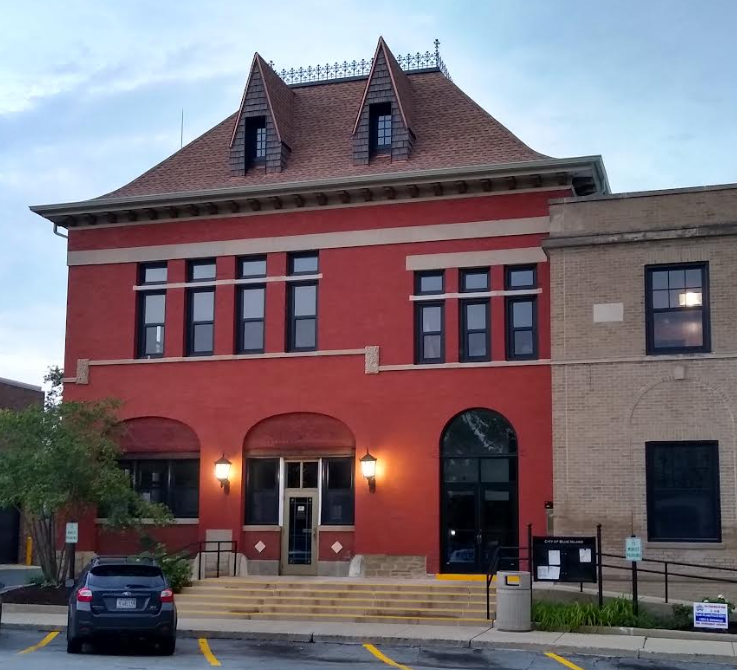
Blue Island Village Hall in Blue Island, Illinois

He designed buildings for E. J. Lehman and Fair Department Store. A photograph of the Chicago home he designed and lived in at 425 W. Saint James Pl. is held in the Art Institute of Chicago's library archives.

Krause designed several buildings in Chicago's Surf-Pine Grove District which was designated a Chicago Landmark in 2007.

== Works ==
- Hoffman House (1890), Surf-Pine Grove District
- City Hall (1891), Blue Island, Illinois (1891)
- Andrew Leicht House (1891), 2400 N Lake View demolished
- Jacob Gross House (1892) at 632 W. Deming Place in Chicago
- Kedzie Building (1892), 81-92 W Randolph, demolished
- Alexandria Hotel (1891) at 542 N Rush Street, demolished
- Lessing Apartments (1898) and Annex, now known as The Commodore (550-569 W Surf in the Surf-Pine Grove District)
- Columbia College Chicago, Lightner Building, 1006 S Michigan Ave (1904)
- Andrew Lanquist House (1904), 4636 N Beacon in Uptown
- Fair Department Store Delivery Station (1904), 5238-5246 N Clark in Andersonville
- Lessing Annex (1904) now known as The Green Brier Apartments, Surf-Pine Grove District
- Majestic Building and its CIBC Theatre in Chicago's Loop (1906), interior design of theater by Rapp & Rapp)
- Clock Building (1906), demolished
- 1500-1506 N. LaSalle Drive
- Krause - Pistroud House (1898), 6212 N Winthrop in Edgewater, demolished
- Edmund Krause Home, originally 3059 N Kenmore (modern 6332 N Kenmore) in Edgewater, owned for a time by Emmanuel Rothchild, demolished by Loyola University along with the Myron Church House, 6338 N Kenmore

== See also ==
- Rapp and Rapp
