= CIBC Theatre =

Theater in Chicago, Illinois

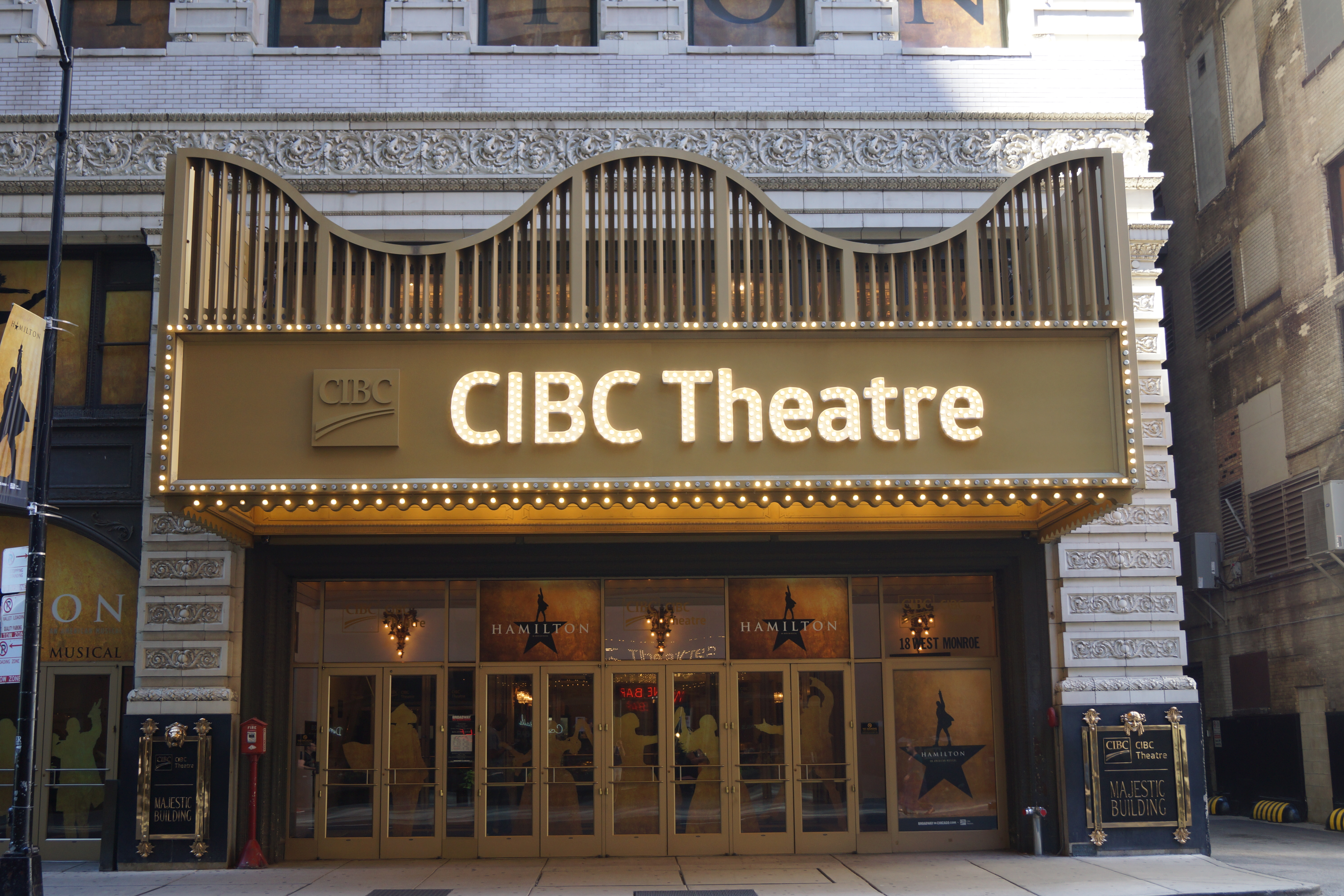
- Interactive map of CIBC Theatre
- Former names: Majestic Theatre, Sam Shubert Theatre, La Salle Bank Theatre, Bank of America Theatre, The PrivateBank Theatre
- Address: 18 West Monroe Street
- Location: Chicago, Illinois
- Coordinates: 41.8808054°N 87.6285104°W
- Owner: Nederlander Organization
- Capacity: 1,800
- Type: Theatre
- Public transit: Blue at Monroe/Dearborn; Red at Monroe/State

Construction
- Opened: 1906
- Renovated: 2005–2006
- Architects: Edmund R. Krause, George Rapp & Cornelius Rapp (Rapp & Rapp)

Website
- www.broadwayinchicago.com/chicago-theater-guide/cibc-theatre-chicago/

CIBC Theatre is a performing arts theater located at 18 West Monroe Street in the Loop area of downtown Chicago. It is operated by Broadway In Chicago, part of the Nederlander Organization. Opened in 1906 as the Majestic Theatre, it currently seats 1,800 and for many years has presented Broadway shows. In its early years, the theater presented vaudeville celebrity acts.

In the 1940s, the theater became part of the Shubert Organization and was known as the Sam Shubert Theatre. Since the 1990s, it has been owned by Nederlander, which refurbished and restored the building and sells naming rights; it has been named for LaSalle Bank, then Bank of America. The PrivateBank acquired the naming rights in December 2015, later becoming CIBC Bank USA, and in 2017, the theatre's name changed to reflect the new bank ownership.

== History ==
The theater opened in 1906 as the Majestic Theatre, named for The Majestic Building in which it is housed. The Majestic was a popular vaudeville theater offering approximately 12 to 15 vaudeville acts running from 1:30 pm to 10:30 pm, six days-per-week. By the 1920s the theater had become part of the Orpheum Circuit and presented many famous vaudeville headliners including Al Jolson, Eddie Foy, Jack Benny, W.C. Fields, Harry Houdini, The Marx Brothers, Bert Williams, Lily Langtry, Eddie Cantor and Fanny Brice. The American Opera Company presented six operas during its two week engagement at the Majestic in October 1929.

Some of the greatest Broadway musicals played while 22 west Monroe was still the Shubert Theatre in the 50's and early 60's. In order of appearance was 'Gypsy' starring the incomparable Ethel Merman, followed by the 'Sound of Music' starring Florence Henderson and this was followed by 'Oliver' which starred some of the original Broadway cast including Davy Jones (who later was a member of 'the Monkees' musical group that had a television show) and this was followed by Hello Dolly starring Carol Channing who was the original 'Dolly' of the Broadway Production. Also, 'My Fair Lady' played here too as did Burt Bacharach's, 'Promises, Promises.'

In 1932, the theater closed during the Great Depression. In 1945, the Shubert Organization purchased the venue, remodeled, and reopened it as the Sam Shubert Theatre. The Nederlander Organization purchased the building in 1991, however, Chicago Public Schools owned the land until 1997 when Nederlander also purchased it. From January 2005 to May 2006, the theater underwent restoration and a name change to the LaSalle Bank Theatre and floors 4-21 of the adjoining office building were converted to the Hampton Inn Majestic Hotel. The hotel & theatre share the building, with the theatre on floors 1-6 & the hotel on floors 4-21. The hotel has a small entrance west of the theatre entrance with its own address of 22 West Monroe Street. Since 2000, the theater has been operated by the Nederlander subsidiary, Broadway In Chicago, and has hosted touring productions, pre-Broadway productions and world premieres. Nederlander sells naming rights. In May 2008, the theater was renamed the Bank of America Theatre when that company acquired LaSalle Bank in 2007. In 2017, it became CIBC Theater when that company bought the then current naming rights holder, PrivateBank.

== Architecture ==
As the first theater built in Chicago after the Iroquois Theatre fire, the Majestic Theatre was specially cited for its fire safety. This theater was also constructed to bring a more elegant audience into the vaudeville circuit. The architects, Edmund R. Krause and the Rapp Brothers (George and Cornelius), thought that by using decadent colors and textures they could attract a more upper-class crowd than traditionally attended vaudeville. The house of the theater also has two prosceniums. These were constructed to racially segregate the audience, as they prevent patrons on the ground level from seeing the patrons on upper levels. Also, by some sources, this theater was once Chicago's tallest building.

=== Restoration ===
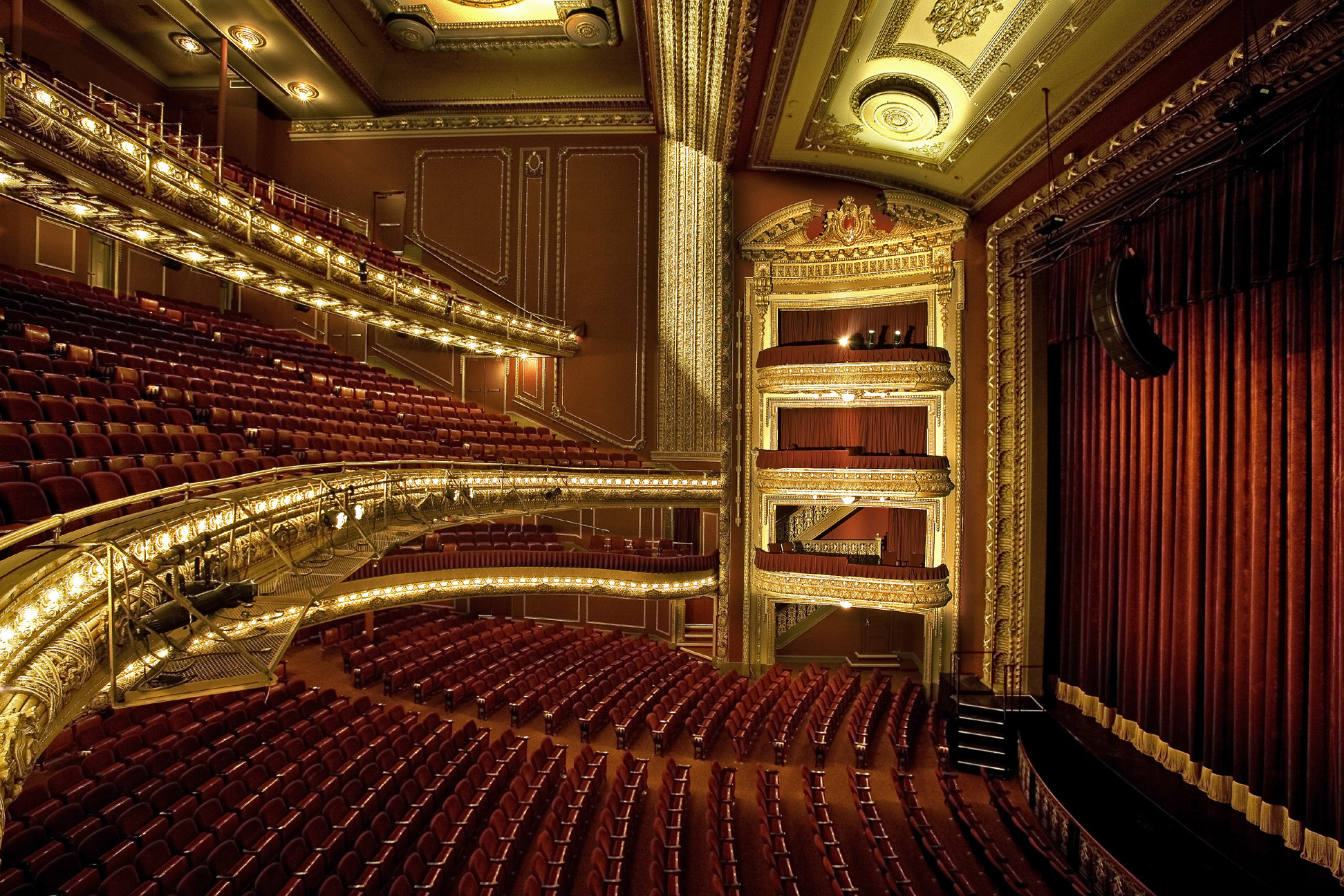
CIBC Theatre auditorium

During the 2005–2006 restoration, elevators were finally installed within the theater. Previously, patrons had to exit the theater and use the elevators in the office building to reach the balcony. As part of the general revamp of the theater, paint chips were analyzed and the theater was repainted in what is believed to be the original color scheme. Most of the original fixtures, as well as the mosaic floor installed in the lobby when the theater opened in 1906, remain. Restorers also discovered a hidden archway in the lobby concession space during their work. This elaborately decorated arch had been walled-over years ago and was forgotten until construction began. The theater now holds 1,800 seats.

== Notable productions ==
This theater has been home to many pre-Broadway tours and world premieres. Michael Crawford played a one-night benefit concert for the newly restored theater's opening night May 24, 2006. Martin Short performed in his sketch comedy satire Martin Short: Fame Becomes Me for two weeks in July 2006. High School Musical premiered in July 2007 during its pre-Broadway tour. Jersey Boys began a 28-month run at the theater in October 2007, followed by the pre-Broadway premiere of Cyndi Lauper's Kinky Boots in October and November 2012. The theater hosted a sit-down production of The Book of Mormon which officially opened on December 19, 2012, and played through October 6, 2013. In December 2015, it began the premiere engagement of a new musical Gotta Dance directed and choreographed by Jerry Mitchell and starring Georgia Engel, Stefanie Powers, Lillias White and Andre DeShields. The production played through January 17, 2016. The theater hosted a resident production of Hamilton that opened September 27, 2016. and ran until January 5, 2020.

As the Shubert Theater, the venue hosted the six-week Chicago run of Sherlock Holmes, featuring Leonard Nimoy in the title role and Alan Sues as Moriarty. The premiere of The Goodbye Girl took place at the Shubert in 1993 prior to its Broadway run. The show was an adaption by Neil Simon of his screenplay of the same name with music by Marvin Hamlisch and lyrics by David Zippel and starred Bernadette Peters and Martin Short. In July 1995, the stage adaption of Victor/Victoria premiered starring Julie Andrews, Tony Roberts and Michael Nouri. It ran until September when it moved to New York. In December 2001, John Lithgow starred in Sweet Smell of Success. Movin' Out, based on the songs of Billy Joel and conceived, choreographed and directed by Twyla Tharp, premiered in June 2002. The final production before renovation was Monty Python's Spamalot which began its pre-Broadway run in December 2004. The production was directed by Tony and Academy Award-winner Mike Nichols and starred David Hyde Pierce, Tim Curry and Hank Azaria.

The theatre hosted the Pre-Broadway premiere of Boop! The Musical, which ran from November 19 to December 31, 2023. Directed by Jerry Mitchell, the show featured music by David Foster, lyrics by Susan Birkenhead, and a book by Bob Martin. The show opened in New York City in 2025.
