= George "Babe" Tuffanelli =

American mobster (1903-1975)

George "Babe" Tuffanelli (born Constant Tuffanelli) (1903-1975) was an Italian-American mobster who ran Chicago's South Side for Al Capone.

== Immigration ==
Tuffanelli was born in Italy and came to America with his brother Luigi Tuffanelli around 1900. Luigi got sick on the voyage; therefore, he was not permitted to enter the U.S. So both brothers jumped ship and came into America as illegal immigrants, settling in New York City.

== Crime involvement ==
Tuffanelli got more involved in the life of crime and became more invested in the Italian Mafia as time passed. He moved to the southside of Chicago, where he became a friend and associate of notorious gangsters such as Al Capone and Jimmy Derrico. Tuffanelli became a powerful member in the Chicago Outfit and ran the southside as boss of Blue Island.

After his rise to power and success, he started investing his money in racecars and then moved with the mob to Las Vegas, Nevada, to invest in the casinos.
