= Autzen =

Autzen is a surname. Notable people with the surname include:

- Thomas Autzen:
  - Thomas E. Autzen (1918–1997), American philanthropist
  - Thomas J. Autzen (1888–1958), Danish-American pioneer in plywood manufacturing and philanthropist

== See also ==
- Autzen Stadium
- Thomas J. Autzen House
