= Thomas Autzen =

Thomas Autzen may refer to:

- Thomas E. Autzen (1918–1997), American philanthropist
- Thomas J. Autzen (1888–1958), Danish-American pioneer in plywood manufacturing and philanthropist
