= General Eaton =

General Eaton may refer to:

- Amos Beebe Eaton (1806–1877), Union Army brigadier general and brevet major general
- Joseph Horace Eaton (1815–1896), Union Army brevet brigadier general
- Lewis Eaton (1790–1857), New York State Militia brigadier general
- Paul Eaton (born 1950), U.S. Army major general
- Thomas Eaton (general) (c. 1739–1809), North Carolina State Militia brigadier general in the American Revolutionary War
