= Pioneer Base Ball Club (Oregon) =

American amateur baseball team

The Pioneer Base Ball Club

Information
- Location: East Portland and Portland, Oregon
- Ballpark: Pioneer Grounds
- Founded: 1866
- Nickname: Pioneers
- Management: Theodore F. Minor

The Pioneer Base Ball Club, known also as the Oregon Pioneers and the Portland Pioneers, was an American amateur baseball team that represented East Portland and Portland, Oregon in the mid-to-late 1860s. It was the first baseball team organized in the state of Oregon. The first mention of the team came on August 3, 1866, when the Pioneer Club played an intra-squad game at their home field in East Portland. The Pioneers attempted to construct a full season in 1867. They played against other amateur teams from Vancouver, Washington, Portland and Oregon City, Oregon. In September 1867, the Pioneers issued a challenge to any amateur team in Oregon and Washington Territory to square-off at the Oregon State Fair. Two teams, the Willamettes of Portland and Clackamas of Oregon City, accepted the challenge.

== Establishment ==
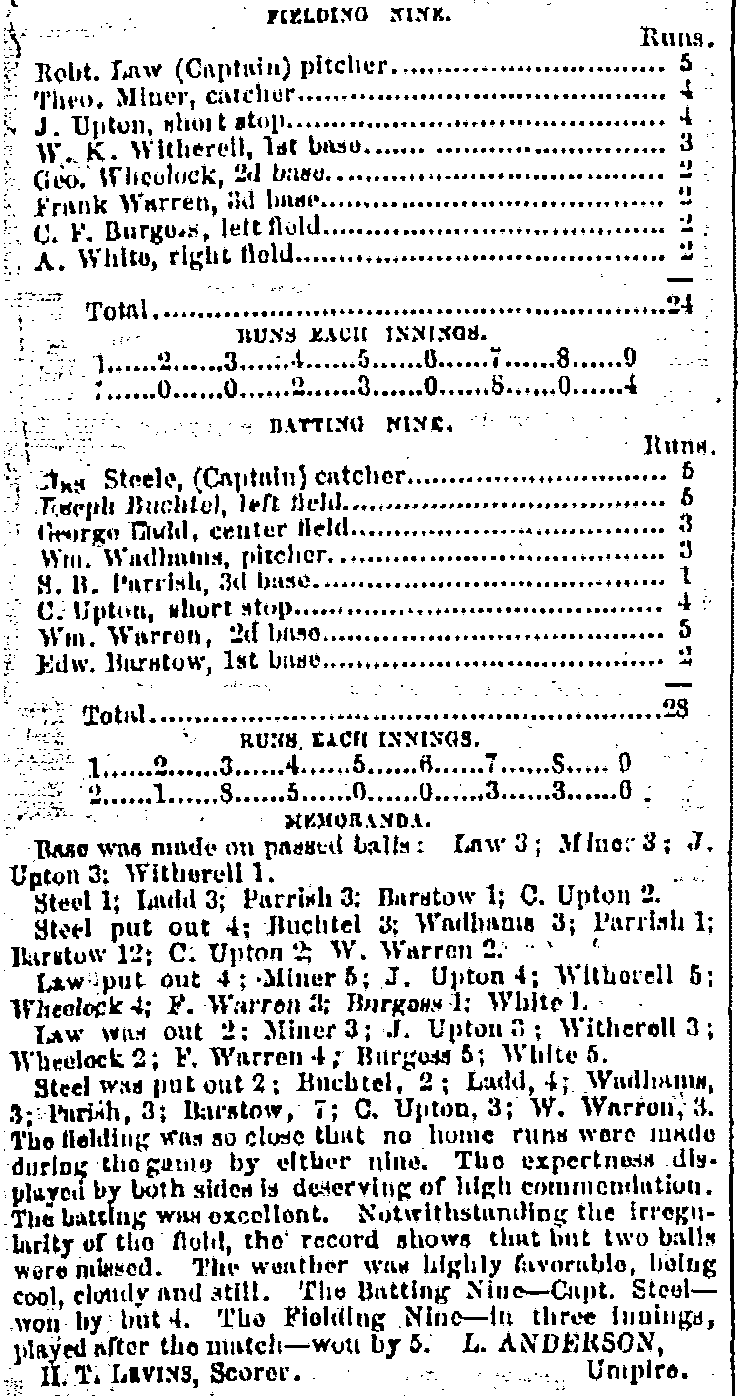
The box score published in The Oregonian of the Pioneers first game on August 8, 1866.

The Pioneer Base Ball Club was organized on June 2, 1866, the first baseball team formed in the state of Oregon. Its first recorded game took place on August 3, 1866. The team, which at the time were said to represent the entire state of Oregon, played an intra-squad match-up, meaning they split the team up and played against each other. The attendance of the game was reported as being "tolerably fair" but that many spectators arrived to the team's ball park East Portland while the game was concluding. Robert Law, a pitcher, served as the captain of the "fielding nine" and James Steel, a catcher led the "batting nine". The fielders' infield was composed of James B. Upton at shortstop, Ward K. Witherell at first base, George Wheolock at second and Frank Warren at third. In the outfield, the fielders played C. F. Berges in left and A. White in right. The fielders catcher was Theodore F. Miner. The batters' infield featured C. Upton at shortstop, Ed Barstow at first base, Frank Warren at second and S. B. Parrish at third. George Cadd and Joseph Buchtel were the batters' outfielders. William Wadhams was their pitcher. The batting nine won the game over the fielders by a score of 28–24.

August 3, 1866 4:00 p.m. (intra-squad game)
Team	1	2	3	4	5	6	7	8	9	R
Batting nine	2	1	8	5	0	0	3	3	6	28
Fielding nine	1	0	0	2	3	0	8	0	4	24
Attendance: "tolerably fair"

On September 15, 1866, the Pioneers Base Ball Club held a practice at the grounds at Oak and Fifth streets at 5:00 p.m. The Pioneers played their second game of the year, which would be their first against a separate team, on October 14, 1866, against the Clackamas Base Ball Club of Oregon City, Oregon. The Pioneers line-up consisted of Joseph Buchtel in left field, James Steel in center field, Ed Quackenbush as the pitcher, William M. Wadhams at second base, Ward K. Witherall at first base, Peter Wolfe DeHuff in right field, James B. Upton at shortstop, Frank Warren at third base and Theodore F. Miner behind the plate as the catcher. During the game, which took place in Oregon City, the Pioneers combined to hit five home runs. Miner and Quackenbush both hit two while DeHuff hit one. The Pioneers were victorious over the home team by a score of 77–45.

October 14, 1866
Team	1	2	3	4	5	6	7	8	9	R
Pioneers	20	22	8	7	8	0	0	0	0	77
Clackamas	2	7	4	6	1	1	3	11	10	45
Home runs: PIO: Miner, 2; Quackenbush, 2; DeHuff, 1 CLA: S. D. Pope, 1; G. Hartling, 1

== 1867 season ==
Before the start of the 1867 season, The Pioneers Base Ball Club sent one of their players to New York City as a delegate for the team at the National Convention of Base Ball. On March 29, 1867, the first team practice of the season was played at the team's ball park. Theodore F. Miner was the president of the Pioneers that season. The Pioneers were split up into two different squads that season. The team's first game of the season came on May 29, against the Occidental Club of Vancouver, Washington. The Pioneers won the game, 79–62.

The Pioneers second game of the season was on June 17, against The Clackamas Base Ball Club of Oregon City, Oregon. The game got underway at 3:43 p.m. with Clackamas sending S. D. Pope in to pitch. Clackamas' infield was composed of Randall at shortstop, Bridges at first base, Salman at second and Barclay at third. In the outfield, Clackamas had Harding, Shepard and Johnson. Zigler did the catching for Clackamas. For the Pioneers, Sachiel did the pitching while Theodore F. Minor did the catching. The Pioneers infield had Quackenbush at shortstop, Witherell, the team's captain, at first base, Steele at second and Cook at third. J. Steele played left field while Dehuff patrolled center and Baughmen in right. Quackenbush, Steele, Cook, DeHuff and Shepard all hit home runs in the game. The Pioneers defeated the visitors, 78–37.

June 17, 1867 3:43 p.m.
Team	1	2	3	4	5	6	7	8	9	R
Clackamas	0	1	7	9	1	0	9	1	8	37
Pioneers	3	10	15	7	8	5	11	13	6	78
WP: Sachiel LP: S. D. Pope; Home runs: CLA: Shepard, 1 PIO: Quackenbush, 1; Steele, 1; Cook, 1; DeHuff, 1

Clackamas and the Pioneers met again on Independence Day in Oregon City with the latter team winning, 55–44. On July 20, 1867, The Pioneer Base Ball Club practiced with another amateur baseball team, The Wide Awake Base Ball club at 5:00 p.m. The Pioneers conducted another practice five days later. On September 7, the Pioneers played an intra-squad game. Before the game that day, the Pioneers issued a challenge to any team in Oregon or Washington Territory to play them at the Oregon State Fair. By the end of September, The Clackamas and Willamette Base Ball Clubs had accepted the Pioneers challenge to play at the fair.

Leading up to the Pioneers match-up at the fair, the team's second squad played a game on September 28 against the Spartans Base Ball Club. Wadhams and Warren were the battery for the Pioneers. The infield for the Pioneers was Upton at shortstop, C. Parrish at first base, Baughman, the team's captain for the game, at second and S. Parrish at third. Bird, Kenney and Malarky were the outfielders. The game, which took place at the Pioneers' home field in East Portland, ended in a 32–4 victory for the visitors.

September 28, 1867
Team	1	2	3	4	5	6	7	8	9	R
Spartans	2	3	5	7	3	0	8	3	32	63
Pioneers (second team)	3	0	2	9	6	3	13	0	4	40
WP: W. Henderson LP: Wadhams; Home runs: SPA: Hutchinson, 2 PIO: S. Parish, 1

== Players ==
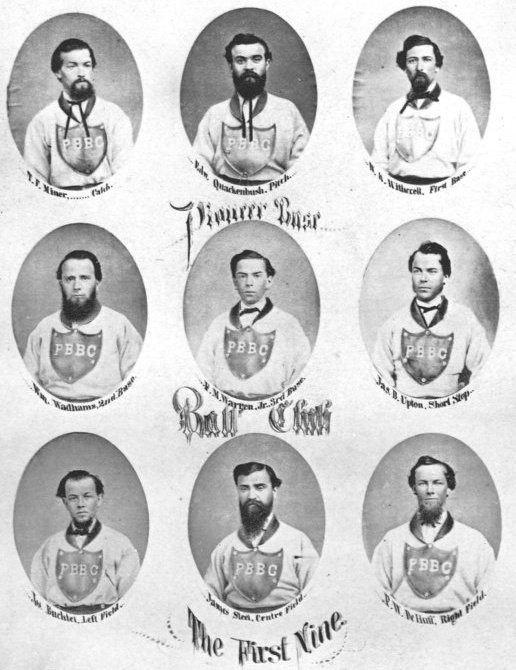
1866 roster

=== Joseph Buchtel ===
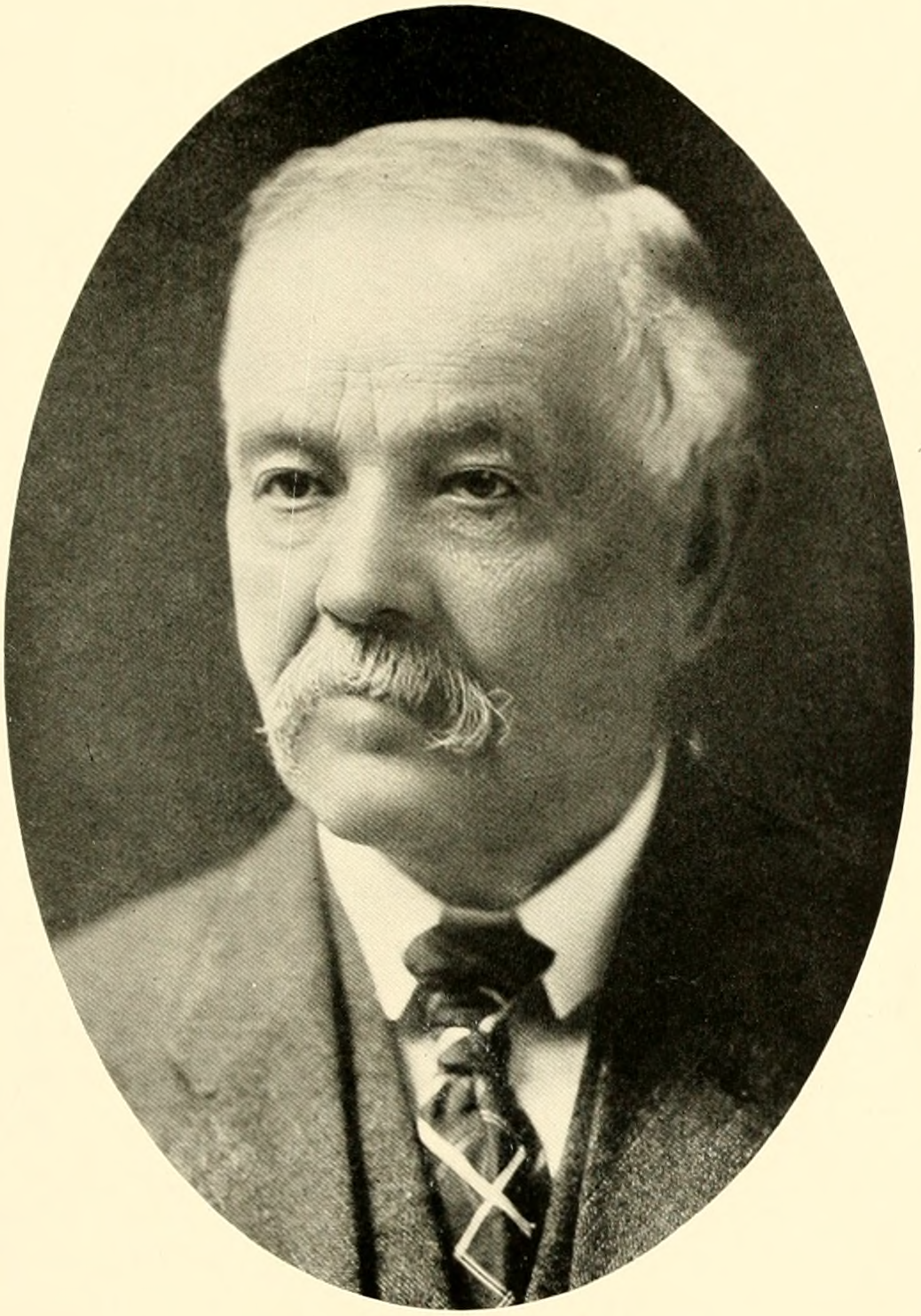
Joseph Buchtel

Joseph Buchtel was born in Ohio in November 1830. He came to Portland in 1852 by covered wagon at the age of 23. His first job in Portland was for Leland H. Wakefield daguerreotype studio on Front Street. Eventually, Buchtel took the company over from Wakefield. He was instrumental in the creation of the Pioneer Club. He owned and operated Portland's first photography studio at 5 Morrison Street. In 1868, Buchtel was elected the president of the Oregon, Washington and Idaho Territories Association of Base Ball Players. Buchtel was married to Josephine of New York. In 1882, Joseph Buchtel started working for the Multnomah County Sheriff's Office. By 1890, he was working as a real estate agent at Buchtel & Mall Real Estate at 958 12^{th} Avenue. He died on August 10, 1916, in Portland. Buchtel also raised the money for a monument at the site of the Champoeg meeting which he helped preserve.

=== James Steel ===
James Steel, the Pioneers' center fielder, moved to Portland in 1862. Steel was a grocer for two years before going into banking as a cashier at the First National Bank of Portland. Later in his life, Steel served as president of the Willamette Savings Bank.

=== Frank Warren ===
Frank Warren, who played with the team in 1866, later made his fortune in the salmon canning industry. The community of Warrendale, Oregon, the site of one of his canneries, was named for him. He died in the sinking of the Titanic in 1912.

== Re-creation ==
Today, the Pioneer Base Ball Club of Portland plays vintage base ball in a modern re-creation of the team of 1866.

== See also ==
- 1845 to 1868 in baseball
- History of baseball in Portland, Oregon
