= History of professional baseball in Portland, Oregon =

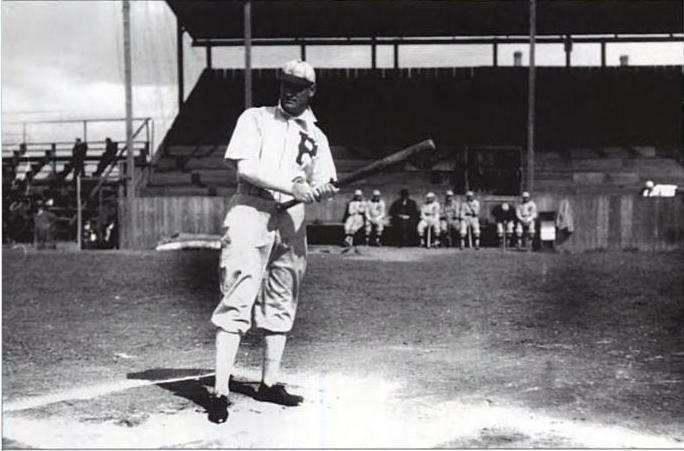
Walt McCredie played for and managed the Portland Beavers in the early 20th century.

Portland, Oregon, has been home to many baseball teams, dating back to the 19th century. Despite this, Portland has never fielded a Major League Baseball team.

In 2018 the Portland Diamond Project was formed to lobby for a Major League Baseball team. Among the members include Russell Wilson, quarterback in the National Football League, and Ciara the professional singer and songwriter.

== Early Portland baseball: 1866–1883 ==
The first organized baseball team on record in the Pacific Northwest was founded in Portland, when on May 28, 1866, the Pioneer Baseball Club of East Portland was created. Known as a gentleman's group at the time, it composed merchants, doctors, lawyers and farmers from rural Portland. Professional players were not allowed to be part of the club. In fact, members had to pay dues in order to be a part of the club. Over the next year many clubs were created throughout the Portland area.

The Pioneers of East Portland invited clubs from throughout the region to a meeting in February 1868 to form what became The Oregon, Washington and Idaho Territories Association of Base Ball Players. The association consisted of five founding clubs—they were the Pioneers, the Portland Spartans, the Highland Baseball Club, the Clackamas Club of Oregon City and the Occidentals of Vancouver, Washington. The teams adopted rules that were slightly modified from those approved by the National Association of Base Ball Players in 1863.

== Professional baseball in Portland: 1883–1901 ==
In 1884 Joe Buchtel, a player-manager for the Pioneers who is regarded as being largely responsible for making baseball popular in Oregon during the 20th century, started a new team in Portland, the Willamettes of East Portland. In 1890 this team became the Portland Webfeet. It helped organize the first professional league in the region, the Pacific Northwest League. This league consisted of teams from Portland, Seattle, Tacoma and Spokane, and began attracting players from around the nation.

In 1891 the Webfeet won the league championship, playing teams from as far as the California League, which included Sacramento, San Francisco, and San Jose. This version of the Pacific Northwest League folded in the second half of the 1892 season due to the onset of a nationwide economic depression known as the Panic of 1893.

An attempt was made in 1896 to restart the Pacific Northwest League, which was alternately known as the New Pacific League. Portland fielded a team in again in the league, this time going by the name of the Portland Gladiators. The season only lasted through June, but the Gladiators did end up winning the league championship with a 19–9 record.

Another new team gained notoriety in Portland in 1886, the Portland Monograms. Consisting largely of neighborhood kids from Central and North Central High Schools, this team was very successful. After defeating teams from Oregon, they went on to win against the Washington State Championship team from Tacoma, earning them the right to go to San Francisco to play the California Champions in a game called the Pacific Tournament. The Monograms played two games against the California Champions, tying the first 12–12 and losing the second 16–14.

== A new era in Portland baseball: 1901–1902 ==
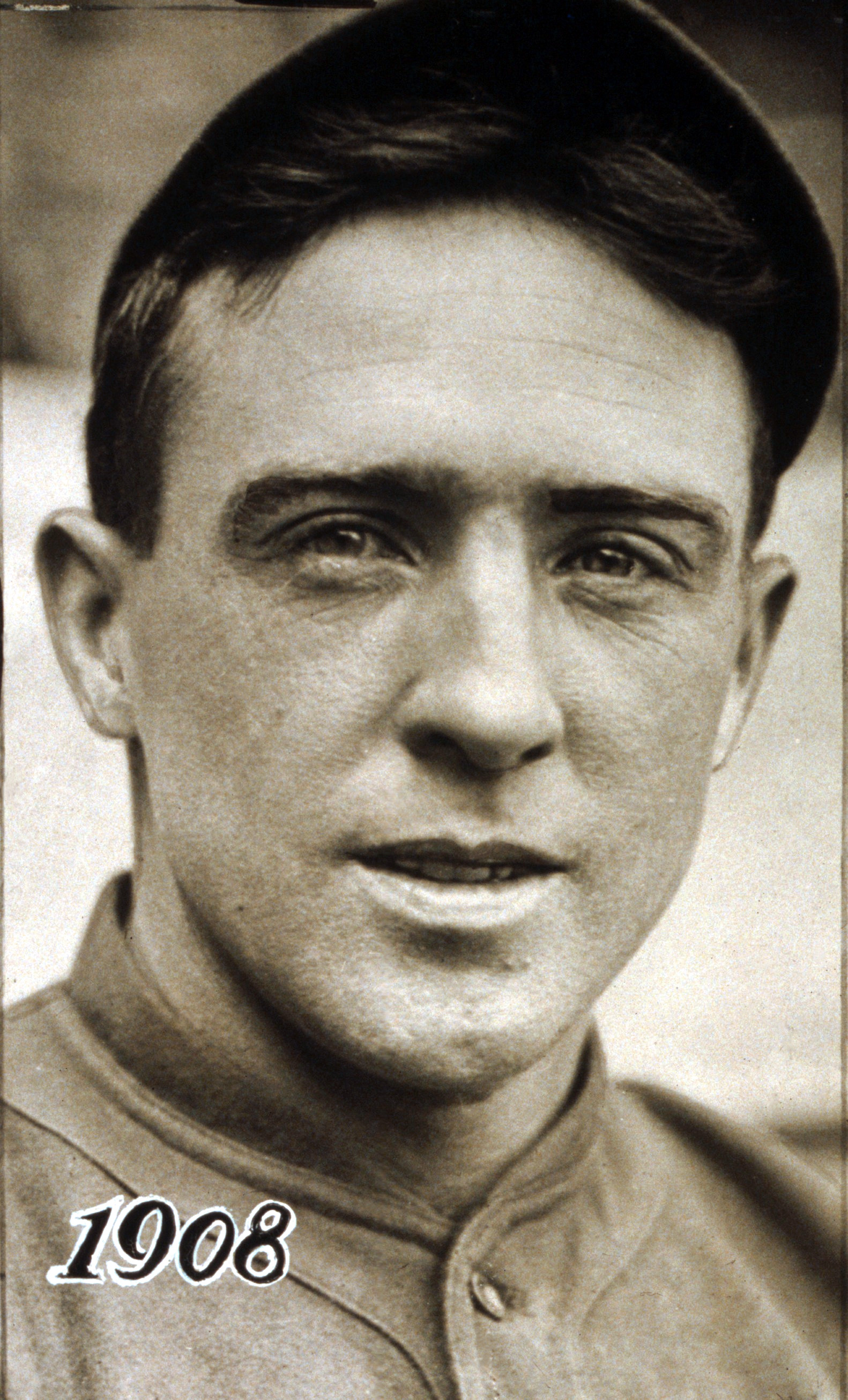
Joe Tinker played for the Webfooters before a career in the major leagues.

In the spring of 1901 a new baseball park was constructed at NW Vaughn Street and NW 24th Avenue that would become known as Vaughn Street Park. This year also saw the second resurrection of the Pacific Northwest League. A group of area businessmen, spearheaded by William H. Lucas, also created the Portland Baseball Club and put together a team to play in the Pacific Northwest League, calling them the Webfooters. This team included Joe Tinker and won the League Championship in their first season.

Following the creation of the National Association of Professional Baseball Leagues in 1901 (renamed Minor League Baseball in 1999), the PNL, and thus the Portland Webfoots, became a Class B league beginning in the 1902 season. In 1902 the team finished fourth in the league.

On December 10, 1902, Henry Harris, the owner of the California League's San Francisco team announced that the Pacific Northwest League team from Portland and a new team from Seattle were joining with the California League to create the Pacific Coast League.

== Pacific Coast League: 1903–1917 ==
The Portland Baseball Club began play in the PCL in 1903, being known as the Portland Browns. Portland finished fifth in the league at the end of the 1903 season. In 1904 the Portland team, finished the season with a 74–136 record, setting a PCL record for the most losses in a season.

The Pacific Northwest League attempted to compete against the new Pacific Coast League in their inaugural year. Replacing the team they lost in Portland, as well as placing teams in Los Angeles and San Francisco, they renamed themselves the Pacific National League. The new team in Portland that year, the Green Gages, only played until July 1 when they moved to Salt Lake City, and changed their name to the Elders. Four other teams from the league stopped playing altogether before the end of the season, leaving only four teams in the league. By the end of the 1905, the old Pacific Northwest/National League was gone for good.

The PCL continued on though, as did the Portland Baseball Club. After the 1904 season, the PCL joined the National Association of Professional Baseball Leagues, thus making Portland a Class A league team (now called AAA Baseball). Also after the 1904 season, Portland outfielder Walter McCredie and his uncle Judge William McCredie purchased the team. The new owners changed the name of the team the Giants for the 1905 season, and Walter became the team's manager while continuing to play. As a result of a newspaper contest, the team was renamed the Beavers (Oregon is the "Beaver State") in time for the 1906 season. The newly named Portland Beavers won their first PCL pennant in 1906, finishing 19½ games over runner-up Seattle. Also in 1906 Beavers player Mike Mitchell led the league in home runs, setting a league record for the least home runs hit by a league leader, hitting it out only six times.

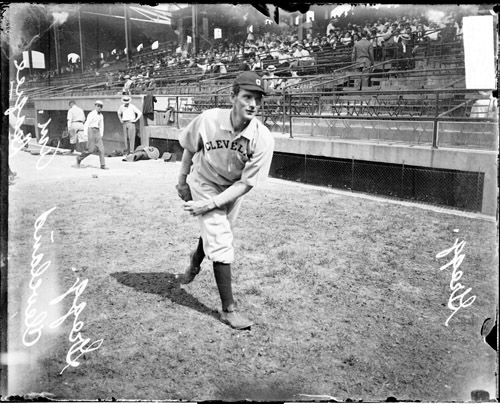
Vean Gregg played for the Portland Beavers before an MLB career that lasted until 1925.

The Beavers finished last in 1907 and second in 1908 and 1909. In 1910 Portland won another pennant being led by the pitching of Vean Gregg and Gene Krapp. Gregg finished the season with a 32–18 record and 14 shutouts while Krapp had a 29–16 record for the season. Portland repeated at PCL champs in 1911 fielding four 20-game-winning pitchers. In 1912, Judge McCredie helped get a new 12,000-seat grandstand built at Vaughn Street Park. His obituary later read that the ballpark was "the sensation of baseball, because it inaugurated a minor league precedent of providing individual grandstand seats, which fellow magnates called an extravagance and a dangerous innovation." The year 1912 also saw a small change in the classification of leagues from the National Association of Professional Baseball Leagues, as they made the top-tier league AA, which the PCL and the Portland Beavers moved into from the previous top tier Class A league.

During the 1910s the Beavers developed some working relationships with other teams. From 1911 to 1914 the Portland Beavers had their own farm team who played in the Northwest League (renamed the Pacific Coast International League in 1918). The Class B team shared the use of Vaughn Street Park and was known as the Portland Pippins in 1911, but changed their name to the Portland Colts in 1912. During the 1914 season the Colts moved to the Seattle area and finished their last season as the Ballard Pippins before folding. Portland also had an informal relationship with the Cleveland Indians through much of the 1910s that saw many future major league stars come through Portland to fine tune their skills.

In 1913 and 1914 Portland played well, winning the pennant in both seasons. Though the 1915 Beavers featured Stan Coveleski, the team didn't fare too well, and started into a tailspin that would last for over a decade. The year also marked the end of their relationship with the Cleveland Indians. With America's entry into World War I, restrictions were placed on travel, such that the Beavers withdrew from the PCL for the 1918 season, playing instead in the Class B Pacific Coast International League. The team was known as the Portland Buckaroos and finished their shortened season (play was stopped on July 7 due to the war) in second place 1½ games back of Seattle. Ironically, the PCL ceased play just a week later as they too were unable to continue play due to the travel restrictions.

Due to the Beaver's withdrawal from the PCL, the league offered Sacramento, California, a franchise to replace the Portland team, while the McCredie's continued to own the baseball club in Portland. The new team in Sacramento was known as the Sacramento Senators, and could be considered a continuation of the original Portland Baseball Club.

== Return to the Pacific Coast League: 1919–1972 ==
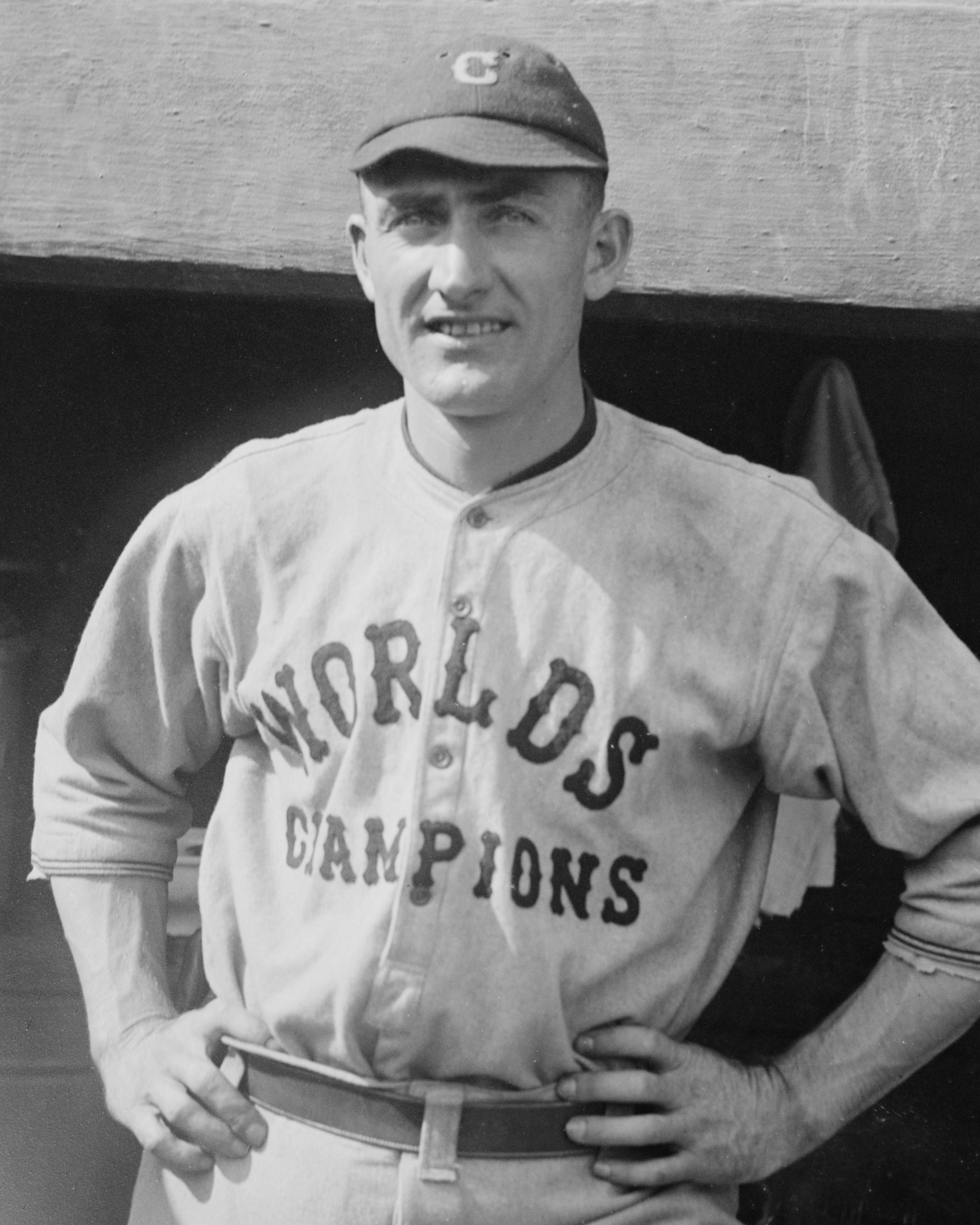
While a member of the Cleveland Indians in 1920, Elmer Smith became the first player to hit a grand slam in the World Series. He later moved down to play two seasons for the Beavers.

With the McCredies still at the helm, Portland was offered the opportunity to become an expansion franchise and re-entered the PCL in 1919. The team finished in seventh place, only ahead of last place Seattle who was also an expansion team that year. Portland finished in last place in 1920 and again in 1921. After the 1921 season, the McCredies sold the team to Walter Klepper who had been president of the Seattle team. Klepper brought in Jim Thorpe who played with the Beavers for the 1922 season, paying him an unheard of minor league salary of $1000 per month. It wasn't long, though, before Klepper was in the middle of a dispute with Baseball Commissioner Kenesaw Mountain Landis. Klepper had brought Seattle player-manager Bill Kenworthy down to manage the Beavers, but Seattle claimed Kenworthy was still under contract and that Klepper had tampered in the matter. Landis suspended Klepper until January 1, 1925, and declared Kenworthy ineligible to play or manage Portland until the 1924 season. According to the book "The Portland Beavers" by Kip Carlson and Paul Andresen, "The feisty Klepper went to court and had the decision overturned, supposedly the only time that Landis ever had a ruling reversed." Kenworthy did manage the Beavers in 1924, replacing popular player-manager Jim Middleton. However, he was fired mid-season, as he was not able to generate support from the players. The 1924 season was also noteworthy in that Mickey Cochrane played on the team.

After the 1924 season, the Beavers officially became a farm team for a major league team when Philadelphia Athletics owners John and Tom Shibe purchased the Beavers as well as Vaughn Street Park. Despite having Duffy Lewis on the team in 1925 (winning the PCL batting title), Elmer Smith in 1926 and 1927 (leading the PCL in home runs in 1926 and all of minor league baseball in home runs in 1927) and Ike Boone in 1928, the Beavers continued to finish in the bottom half of the league.

Longtime head groundskeeper Rocky Benevento started working for the Beavers in 1927. Benevento was so popular with the fans that they took up a collection for him in 1956 to send him to the World Series. Benevento retired at the end of the 1966 season and was given a new car. When Benevento died in 1969, Portland newspaper The Oregonian stated, "He adored kids...he loved baseball...and most of all he loved people." His funeral had an overflowing crowd that included Oregon Governor Tom McCall. Benevento's stayed with the team 40 years, spanning 30 managerial changes and five ownership changes. While the former location of Vaughn Street Park is now a parking lot, there is a plaque honoring Benevento for his efforts in furthering baseball in Portland.

In 1929 the Beavers changed their name to the Portland Ducks, bearing a duck on their uniform, and were also occasionally known as the Portland Rosebuds. The name change didn't change the team's luck, as they finished with a 90–112 record. Long time radio broadcaster Rollie Truitt also joined the team's staff, and worked for the team for 35 years, spanning 28 managerial changes and five ownership changes. Truitt would later be known as the "Dean of Pacific Coast League broadcasters." In 1930 the team reverted to the Beavers name, but would occasionally be referred to as the Ducks for over decade. The highlight of the Beavers last-place 1930 season was William Rhiel's unassisted triple play, the last recorded in PCL history.

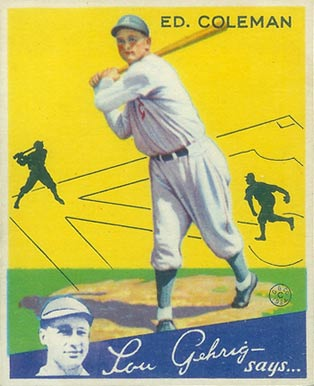
1934 baseball card for Ed Coleman, then a member of the Philadelphia Athletics

In 1931 team President Tom Turner bought the team from the Shibe brothers and the team took a turn for the positive. Ed Coleman led the PCL in hits and runs batted in, and the team finished in third winning 100 games. The team continued to improve in 1932, winning Portland its first pennant since 1914. The team finished second in 1933. Turner brought Walter McCredie back to manager the team in 1934, but he died early in the season and the team fell to the bottom half of the league.

Following the 1934 season, E. J. Shefter bought the team from Turner. The team improved in 1935 finishing one game over .500, and then won the pennant in 1936, finishing but 1½ games over runner-up Oakland, then winning the postseason series to capture the crown. In 1937 the Beavers finished in fourth place, but made it to the playoffs defeating San Francisco in the first round before losing to the San Diego team featuring a young Ted Williams. The team finished sixth in 1938 before finishing in last place from 1939 to 1942. The 1940 team was so bad, finishing 56–122, that they were still 25 games behind the seventh place team (the league had eight teams at that time).

In 1943 William Klepper, with partner George Norgan buying a minority share, purchased the Beavers. The team came back that season with their first winning record since 1937. The management of the team began referring to the team as the "Lucky Beavers" and Vaugh Street Park was known as "Lucky Beaver Stadium." With the United States firmly involved in World War II, local radio station KXL sold over $300,000 in war bonds in 1943 to fund the building of a bomber for the war that would be dubbed "The Lucky Beaver". At the time, the available pool of baseball players in the nation was ravaged. Somehow though, the Beavers still moved up in the league, finishing second in 1944. In 1945 the Beavers brought another pennant to Portland being skippered by player-manager Marv Owen. Despite winning the pennant, the team lost to San Francisco in the first round of the playoffs. To commemorate Portland's 1945 pennant win, Portland held a banquet at the Multnomah Hotel (now the downtown Portland Embassy Suites). Oregon Governor Earl Snell presented a commemorative watch and gold and diamond ring to each player at the banquet. The watches were given to the players because L.H. Gregory of The Oregonian requested that fans donate money to a fund for the purpose. Gregory did this because he felt it was not right that no memento was given to the players from the 1936 championship team. Following the 1945 season, Norgan purchased Klepper's share of the team, becoming the team's new owner.

In 1946 the Beavers fell to the bottom half of the league, finishing in seventh place, 41 games out of first. In 1947 Eddie Basinski joined the Beavers, and they finished third, losing to the Los Angeles Angels in the first round of the playoffs. The team drew a record of 421,000 fans that season. This record would stand for the Beavers until the 2001 season when AAA Baseball returned to Portland.

In 1948 the team finish fifth, followed by a sixth-place finish in 1949. The 1949 season began the integration of the Pacific Coast League as Frankie Austin and Luis Marques became Beavers. Beginning with the 1950 season the Beavers finished fourth for four straight years. Clay Hopper, who had been Jackie Robinson's manager when he played for the Montreal Royals in 1946, was named the team's manager in 1952. This year also marked the first year the Pacific Coast League, and the Portland Beavers, were classified by the National Association of Professional Baseball Leagues as an "Open League." The open league was a step above AAA, and was an attempted by the Pacific Coast League to be considered the third major league.

Plans for a new ballpark were announced by the team in 1953. Originally the team planned to build a new stadium at 82nd & Holgate in Southeast Portland. Due to the Korean War, among other issues, the stadium never came to fruition. In 1954 the team dropped again to the bottom of the league. After the 1954 season the team went up for sale via public stock, which resulted in 2,400 new owners for the 1955 season. With the change the Beavers rose to fifth place, only nine games back of first.

In 1956, the Beavers left Vaughn Street Park to move into 25,000-seat Multnomah Stadium, eventually renamed Civic Stadium. Throughout most of the 1960s, the Beavers were the AAA affiliate of the American League Cleveland Indians, nurturing such future stars as "Sudden" Sam McDowell, Lou "Mad Dog" Piniella, and Luis "El Gigante" Tiant. Later major league affiliations included Minnesota and Philadelphia.

== Independent baseball in Portland: 1973–1977 ==
After 1972, in which the Beavers drew fewer than 92,000 fans for the entire season, the team left Portland for Spokane. The Class A Portland Mavericks filled the void left by the departure of the Beavers. The Mavericks played in the short-season Northwest League, with a schedule running from mid-June through August. They won four division titles in their five-year history (second place in 1974), but never won the league championship.

== AAA returns to Portland: 1978–1993 ==
The PCL expanded in 1978 and added a new team in Portland, calling themselves the Beavers. The new Beavers played in Civic Stadium through 1992. In 1983, the Beavers won the PCL pennant, the first for Portland in 47 years. Though finishing fourth overall that year, the Beavers defeated the Edmonton Trappers to win the Northern Division title, then bested the Albuquerque Dukes in the finals to capture the flag.

After the 1993 season, Beavers owner Joe Buzas moved the team to Salt Lake City, where they became the Salt Lake Buzz, and later the Stingers. Their current nickname is the Bees.

== Northwest League baseball: 1994–2000 ==
For the first time since 1899, Portland was without a baseball team for the 1994 season. The departure of the PCL did eventually bring about the return of the short-season Northwest League. Following their inaugural season in 1994, the Class A Bend Rockies relocated to the now available market of Portland in 1995. The Portland Rockies played in the Rose City for the next six seasons and served an important role for the city, whose demand for a major league team was growing. Portland's support for the Rockies paved the way for the return of AAA baseball in 2001.

== The Beavers return: 2000–2010 ==
Following the 2000 season, the Los Angeles Dodgers and San Diego Padres swapped AAA teams. The Albuquerque Dukes (a charter franchise of the PCL under the name Los Angeles Angels) moved to Portland, becoming the Beavers, as the San Diego Padres affiliate. As part of the relocation agreement, Civic Stadium was renovated in 2000 and renamed PGE Park. The Dodgers took control of the Padres' Las Vegas Stars, who would be renamed the 51's. The Portland Rockies would move up the Columbia River to Pasco and become the Tri-City Dust Devils in 2001.

During this time, Dr. Lynn Lashbrook spearheaded the effort to bring MLB to Portland. In 2003, Dr. Lashbrook led the lobbying efforts that resulted in a $150 million construction bill for a new baseball stadium in Portland. Under his leadership, the group secured legislative action to subsidize a new stadium with ballplayers’ payroll taxes.

In 2007, owner Merritt Paulson announced that he was considering changing the name of the team to prevent confusion with the Oregon State University Beavers, whose baseball team won the national championships in 2006 and 2007. Possible new names and logos were unveiled, and a vote was staged on the team website. "Portland Beavers" won the contest, and the team unveiled new logos and colors on January 29, 2008. The Beavers emphasized their connection to the three prior franchises with the notation "Est. 1903" on their primary logo. The team also brought back the name "Lucky Beavers" as part of a sleeve patch on their alternate jersey.

In 2009, the city of Portland was awarded a Major League Soccer (MLS) expansion franchise for 2011, to be named the Portland Timbers. The Portland City Council approved a $31 million agreement to renovate PGE Park to a soccer- and football-only stadium, with the condition that a new ballpark be built in Portland for the Beavers by 2011.

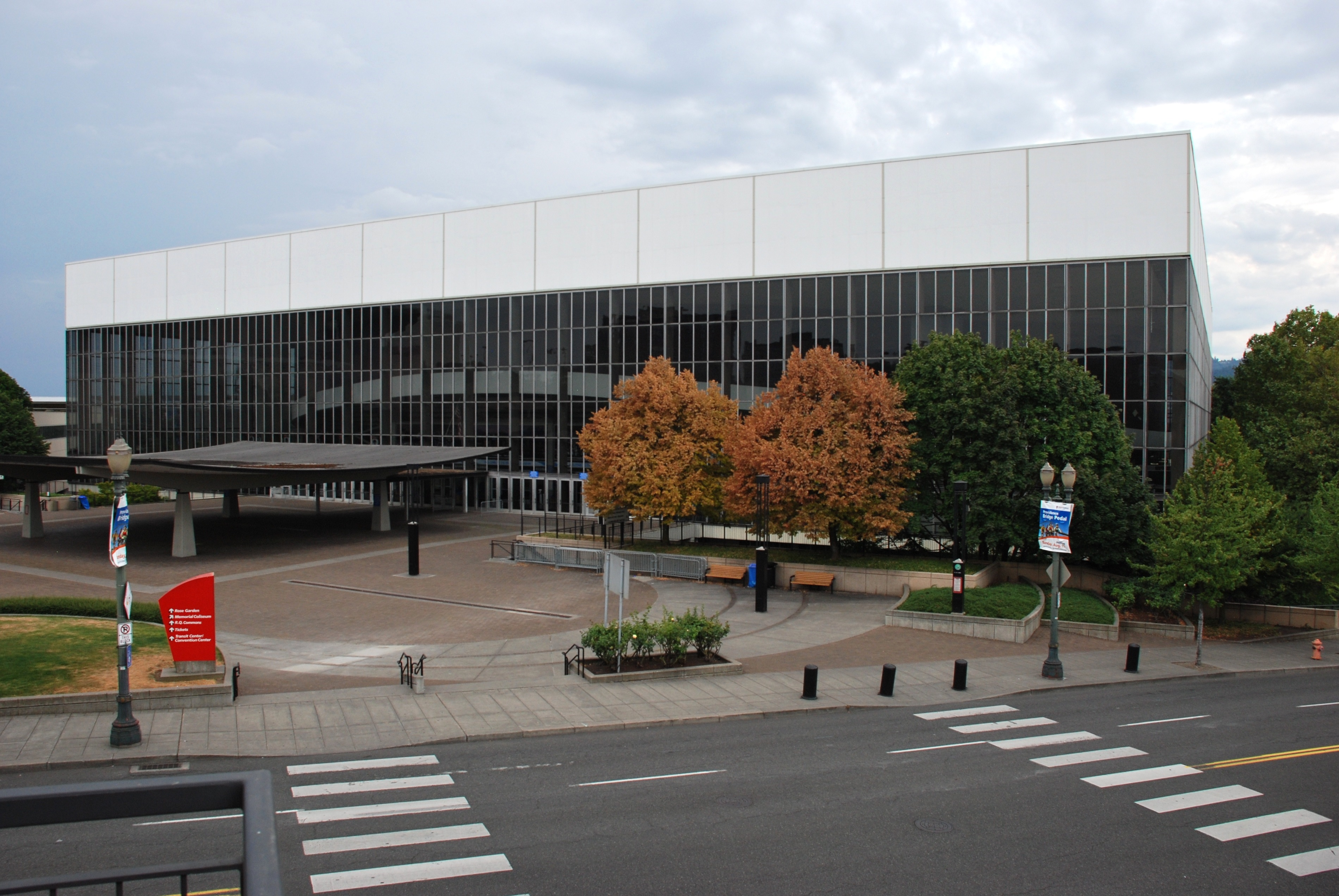
The Memorial Coliseum in the Rose Quarter was an original site for the ballpark; however, it met public opposition.

Initial plans called for the new ballpark to be built at the site currently occupied by the Memorial Coliseum, which would have been torn down, but public outcry about demolishing a Portland landmark led Portland mayor Sam Adams to propose a second site in the Rose Quarter area north of Memorial Coliseum. The site, however, proved to be too small. Another location in the Lents neighborhood in southeast Portland was also rejected due to objections from neighbors.

In June 2009, the Portland City Council voted to separate the soccer and baseball projects, allowing renovation of PGE Park to proceed without completed plans for a baseball stadium in place. Other locations in the Portland area were considered for the ballpark, including a vacant terminal at the Port of Portland, Delta Park, the Portland Expo Center, Portland Meadows, the Westwood Corporation Heliport site, a building owned by Portland Public Schools near the Rose Quarter, and suburban locations in Beaverton, Clackamas, and Vancouver, Washington. None of these sites progressed past initial discussions.

With no suitable Portland location available, in July 2010, Paulson announced that he was putting the team up for sale and relocation, and the Beavers played their last game in Portland on September 6, 2010, beating the Las Vegas 51s 6–5 before a sellout crowd. Padres owner Jeff Moorad formed a group to buy the team and talked of moving its home games to the Lake Elsinore Diamond in Lake Elsinore, California, until a new stadium in Escondido could be built. Eventually, the group decided to move the team temporarily to Tucson, rename them the Tucson Padres, and then move again to Escondido when the new ballpark is built.

== Attempts to bring baseball back to Portland: 2011–2012 ==
On August 2, 2011, the Milwaukie city council unanimously encouraged city staff to continue its efforts to bring professional baseball back to the Portland-Metro area. It had previously been reported in The Oregonian that the city's economic development director had been working with other individuals and groups to place a 4,000-seat ballpark on a state owned maintenance facility within the city near their border with Portland. A MAX Light Rail line that is under construction will go by the proposed site, which would facilitate access to proposed ballpark, and the two projects are spurring interest in the area by developers. At the October 4, 2011, council meeting, the council directed city staff to engage the community in discussions about the project and authorized them to hire a consultant to further research the project.

== The Northwest League returns: 2013–present ==
In 2012, it was announced that Portland suburb Hillsboro had reached a deal to relocate the Yakima Bears. Construction of a new 4,500-seat stadium in Hillsboro began later that year and was completed in June 2013, as the home of the renamed Hillsboro Hops. The Hops replaced the Beavers as Portland's minor league baseball team. The team's first game was a 3–2 road loss to the Salem-Keizer Volcanoes; the team's home opener was notable for several firsts: the team's first sellout, drawing over 4,700 fans; the team's—and Hillsboro Ballpark's—first home run; and the team's first win.

== Portland Diamond Project ==
The Portland Diamond Project was founded with the purpose of trying to bring Major League Baseball to Portland. On September 23, 2024, they announced that they had signed a letter of intent to purchase Zidell Yards to build a ballpark.
