= Narcissa White Kinney =

American temperance worker

Narcissa Edith Kinney (née White; July 24, 1854 – January 5, 1901) was an American temperance worker. She was associated with the Woman's Christian Temperance Union (WCTU) and the Chautauqua Association.

== Early life ==
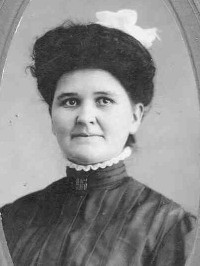
Narcissa White Kinney, as a young girl

Narcissa Edith White was born in Grove City, Pennsylvania, the daughter of George Washington White (1812–1882) and Susannah Kerr Wallace (1815–1872). She was Scotch-Irish through ancestry. Her mother's maiden name was Wallace, and family records show that she was a direct descendant of Adam Wallace, who was burned in Scotland for his religion, and whose faith and death are recorded in Foxe's Book of Martyrs. At his death his two sons, David and Moses Wallace, fled to the north of Ireland, whence Narcissa's grandfather, Hugh Wallace, emigrated to the U.S. in 1796. Her father's ancestor, Walter White, was also burned during Queen Mary's reign, and the record is in Fox's Book of Martyrs, and four of her far-away grandfathers, two on each side of the house, fought side by side in the Battle of the Boyne.

She was raised in a Conservative church, the United Presbyterian.

== Career ==
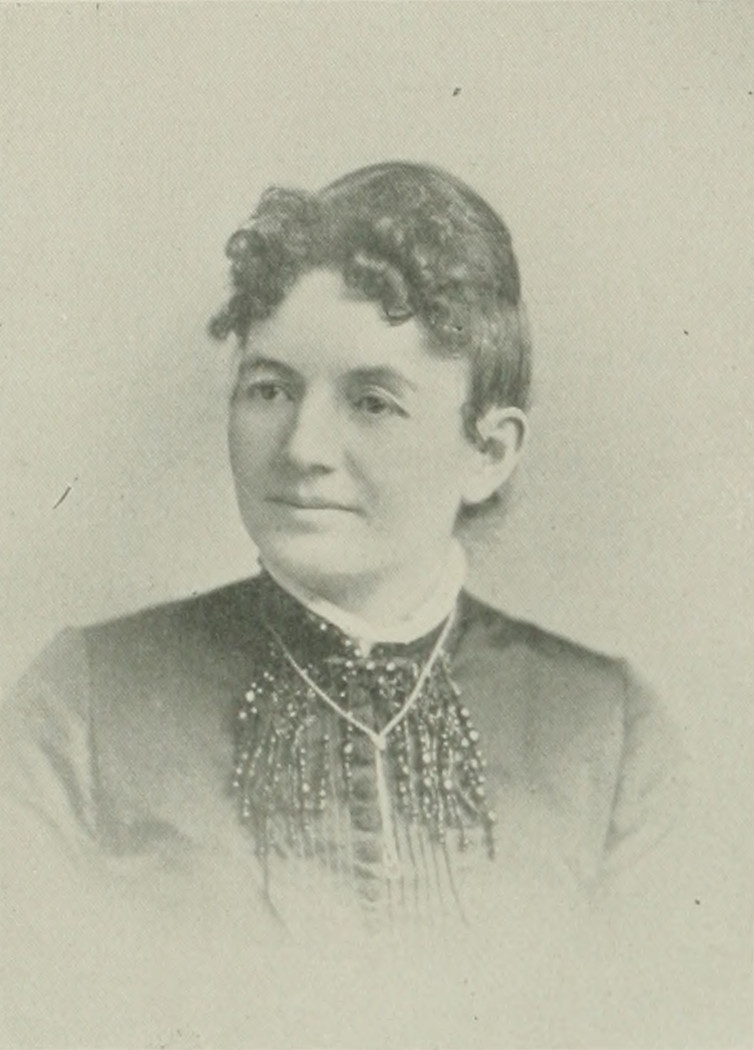
A Woman of the Century

After becoming a teacher before she was 15 years old, she was recalled to her alma mater, the Edinboro State Normal School, as an instructor in the training department. She was also chosen at the same time superintendent of Edinboro Union School, Erie, Pennsylvania. Later, she was engaged as a county institute instructor.

Not until the fall of 1880 did she join the temperance movement, in the white-ribbon rank. Her first relation to the WCTU was as president of the local union in her town, Grove City, and next of her own county, Mercer, where she built up the work in a systematic fashion. Next, she was made superintendent of normal temperance instruction for her State, and did work by lecturing, writing and pledging legislators to the hygiene bill after her arguments had won them to her view of the situation. She attended and studied at the school of Col. Francis Wayland Parker, of Quincy, Massachusetts, to learn the best method of teaching hygiene to the young.

In the autumn of 1884, Kinney was sent by the National WCTU to assist the WCTU of Washington Territory in securing from the legislature the enactment of temperance laws. Under the persuasive eloquence and wise leadership of White the most stringent scientific temperance law ever enacted was passed by a unanimous vote of both houses. Also, in spite of the bitter opposition of the liquor traffic, a local-option bill was passed, submitting to the vote of the people in the following June the prohibition of the liquor traffic in each precinct. White assisted in that campaign and had the gratification of seeing prohibition approved by a majority vote of all the citizens, both men and women, of the Territory.

In 1890, she was prostrated by the death of both her children in infancy. She recovered her health, and in 1891, she undertook the work of organizing a Chautauqua Association for the State of Oregon, in which she succeeded. She served as secretary of the association. Her husband, who owned a popular temperance seaside resort, gave the association grounds and an auditorium that cost $2,500.00 ($2,500.00 in 1914 had the same buying power as $60,358.00 in 2017). The first meeting of the new Chautauqua Assembly of Oregon was held in August 1891. Kinney liberally supported the Chautauqua movement in Oregon, having contributed about $6,000.00 to the work.

== Personal life ==
She met Marshall Johnston Kinney (1847–1932), a prominent merchant of Astoria, Oregon, during her lecture tours on behalf of the WCTU. At the time, he owned the world's largest salmon cannery. They married in 1888 and relocated to Astoria.

Kinney died on January 5, 1901, aged 46, and is buried at River View Cemetery, River View Cemetery, Portland, Oregon.
