= Frank M. Warren Sr. =

American businessman (1848–1912)

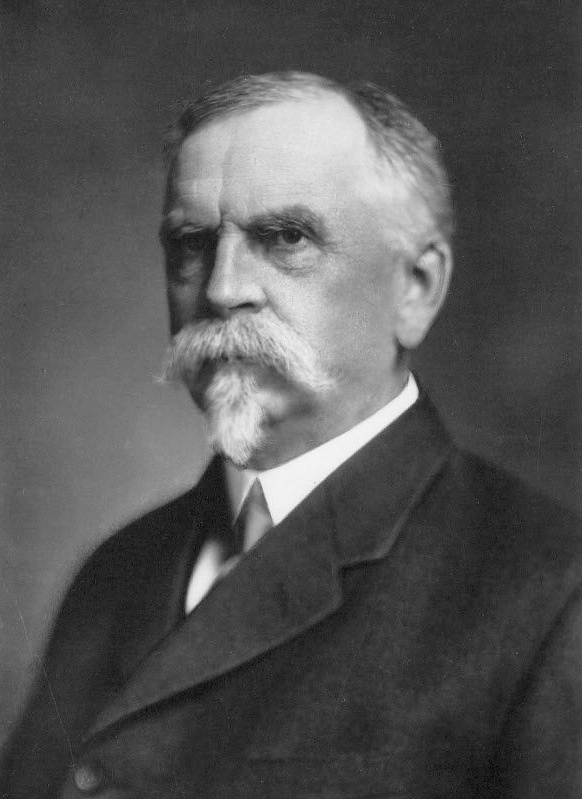
- Born: May 10, 1848; Ellsworth, Maine, U.S.
- Died: April 15, 1912 (aged 63); Atlantic Ocean
- Occupation: Businessman
- Spouse: Anna Sophia Atkinson (m. 1872)
- Children: 4

Frank Manley Warren Sr. (May 10, 1848 – April 15, 1912) was a prominent American businessman from Oregon who made his fortune in the salmon canning industry. The community of Warrendale, Oregon, the site of one of his canneries, was named for him. He died in the sinking of Titanic.

== Biography ==
Warren was born on May 10, 1848, in Ellsworth, Maine, and came to the Oregon Territory with his parents, Francis M. Warren and Elizabeth Dyer Warren, when he was 3. The family lived on a donation land claim in Rainier, Oregon. Francis Warren (1818 – 1900) was a member of the Oregon Territorial Legislature in 1857. When Frank Warren was 9, the family moved to Portland. When he was 15 he worked for Wells Fargo; he also worked for Ladd & Tilton Bank. In 1866, Warren was a member of The Pioneer Base Ball Club.

Warren founded the Warren Packing Company, a salmon canning business, and was considered a pioneer of the salmon canning industry on the Columbia River, building his first cannery at Cathlamet, Washington, in 1869. He later built a cannery in Warrendale, which was also the site of a state-run fish hatchery in 1889 and 1890.

Warren married Anna Sophia Atkinson, the daughter of pioneer missionary George H. Atkinson, in 1872. They had four children, Frank, Frances, George, and Anna.

The Warrens were members of the First Congregational United Church of Christ in Portland. In the 1890s the Warrens were active members of the church and their patronage helped acquire the land and complete the church building next to the South Park Blocks. Frank Warren was on the board of trustees of Pacific University, which was co-founded by Anna's father.

By the time of the sinking of Titanic it was said Warren was a millionaire.

== Titanic ==
Frank and Anna Warren boarded Titanic at Cherbourg and were traveling first class. They were returning from a three-month trip to Europe to celebrate their 40th wedding anniversary and were the only first-class passengers originally from Oregon on the ship. Anna Warren survived the sinking of Titanic on April 15, 1912, after Frank Warren helped her onto a lifeboat and then stepped back onto the ship. If Frank Warren's body was recovered from the shipwreck it was never identified. An account of Anna's experience was printed in the Morning Oregonian on April 27, 1912.

== Memorials and legacy ==
There is a cenotaph for Warren in River View Cemetery in Portland. Anna died in 1925; she is buried in River View Cemetery. An Oregonian article at the time of Mrs. Warren's death states that after the Titanic disaster she suffered from ill health.

Warren's son Frank M. Warren Jr. (1876–1947) also worked in the salmon packing industry, and was president of the Port of Portland, a director of Portland General Electric, and a member of the Oregon State Fish Commission. Warren's other son George worked for the Warren Packing Company as well.

== Homes ==
Francis Warren's house was located at SW Salmon Street and 9th Avenue in downtown Portland; today the parking structure for the Heathman Hotel is located at the site. His son Frank's home was next door.

Frank Warren owned what is now known as the George Earle Chamberlain House, built in 1893, after signing on as a trustee for his friend, wealthy banker David D. Oliphant. Governor George Earle Chamberlain bought the house in 1904.

After moving from 9th and Salmon, Frank Warren Sr. moved to a home designed by Whidden & Lewis at 969 SW St. Clair Avenue (originally 215 W St. Clair Street) in Portland's West Hills. Anna was living there at the time of her death. Another Frank M. Warren House is located at 2545 NW Westover Road, it is now a bed and breakfast. It was designed by Joseph Jacobberger and built in 1904 for Frank Warren Jr.

== See also ==
- Andrew B. Hammond, founded the Columbia River Packers Association
- Robert Deniston Hume, salmon cannery owner
- John West, salmon cannery owner
