= Dodson, Oregon =

Unincorporated community in the state of Oregon, United States

Coordinates: 45.605395°N 122.03564°W

Dodson is an unincorporated community in Multnomah County, Oregon, United States. It is located about 4½ miles (7.2 km) east of Multnomah Falls and one mile west of Warrendale, in the Columbia River Gorge on Interstate 84/U.S. Route 30. It is across the Columbia River from Skamania, Washington. Dodson is within the Cascade Locks ZIP code.

Dodson was a railroad station on the Oregon-Washington Railroad & Navigation Company line (today owned by Union Pacific) named for Ira Dodson, who was an early settler in the area. Dodson station was moved several times and was once located near present-day Warrendale. Circa 1885 the station was also known as "Dodsons". Author Ralph Friedman says Dodson is a "hamlet that time and tracks have passed by". At one time Dodson had a gas station and a motel. Bonneville Grade School in Dodson closed in 1996 because of declining enrollment. The school also served the students of Warrendale and Bonneville.

Dodson was the site of the McGowan salmon cannery and a fish wheel c. 1900. In February 1996, a series of massive debris flows, resulting from the same severe weather that caused flooding in the Willamette Valley, occurred between Dodson and Warrendale, destroying homes and blocking the railroad and I-84 for several days. A 1.65 acre parcel in the landslide area was bequeathed to the Friends of the Columbia Gorge Land Trust, which hopes to convey the property into public ownership.
