= Ben Boloff =

Communist prisoner in Oregon

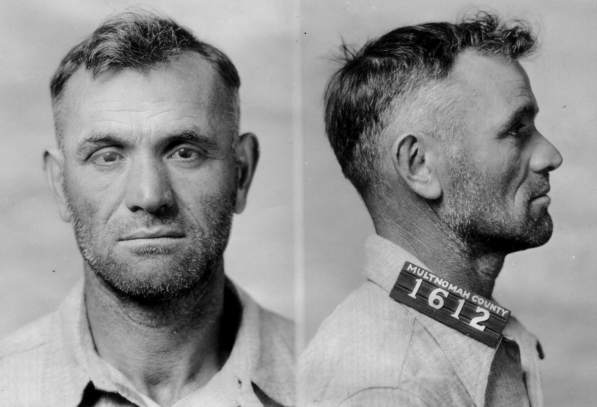
- Born: 1893; Russia
- Died: October 12, 1932 (aged 38–39); Portland, Oregon, US
- Cause of death: untreated tuberculosis
- Resting place: River View Cemetery
- Citizenship: Transcaucasian Socialist Federative Soviet Republic
- Occupation: laborer
- Height: 1.6 m (5 ft 3 in)
- Political party: Communist
- Criminal charge: criminal syndicalism
- Criminal penalty: ten years imprisonment
- Criminal status: charges suspended after 15 months

Ben Boloff (1893 – October 12, 1932) was a Soviet Russian communist who resided in Portland, Oregon. An illiterate Jewish laborer, Boloff was arrested in 1930 under Oregon's criminal syndicalism statute, which made it illegal to be associated with communist or anarchist groups. Boloff was the first person to be tried under the statute since its implementation during the First Red Scare. He was arrested with 12 other suspected communists, but was the only one to be sentenced to prison.

While imprisoned at the Oregon State Penitentiary, he contracted tuberculosis and was denied treatment. He was released from prison after fifteen months on a suspended sentence, which was issued by the original circuit judge that sentenced him. He died on October 12, 1932, and his supporters called it a murder by the State of Oregon. His funeral attracted several socialist and communist supporters as they carried Boloff's coffin through the street. Despite being a citizen of Transcaucasian Socialist Federative Soviet Republic, Boloff was never deported after being convicted and was eventually buried in his adopted hometown of Portland.

== Biography ==
Boloff lived in Portland, Oregon, and worked as a construction worker. He was arrested on November 1, 1930, in Portland initially on the charge of vagrancy, but police found a communist membership card on him, leading them to charge him under Oregon's criminal syndicalism statute. Boloff's arrest was one of several arrests of communists in 1930 by the Portland Police Bureau, but his case was unique in that it was one of the few cases to be tried in court. He entered a not guilty plea in court. His trial was delayed from January to February 1931. Boloff was the first of the 12 people charged under the criminal syndicalism to be tried. The jury selection focused on the prospective member's opinions on the First Amendment to the United States Constitution.

=== Trial and sentencing ===
During Boloff's trial, a police informant testified as a witness for the prosecution stating that the Communist party's goal was to recruit high school students, including those at Washington High School and train them against patriotism and capitalism. He went on to say that Communist agreed with public education, but disapproved of the administration. He never directly named Boloff in his testimony. A Communist party membership card with Vladimir Lenin's profile on it was submitted into evidence.

Boloff took the witness stand in his own defense. He stated that he was unable to read the English language and that did not know of Oregon's criminal syndicalism or that it made being associated with communist organizations as punishable offence. Boloff stated that he only joined the Communist party because they represented working people like himself. The state asked him just one question during cross examination, whether or not he was a member of the Communist party since 1924, which Boloff admitted he was. The jury found him guilty of criminal syndicalism and he was sentenced to ten years at the Oregon State Penitentiary. After his conviction, a petition was written demanding Boloff's immediate release was circulated. The petition was investigated by the Portland Police Bureau's Red Squad, a group of officers who investigated communist activity. Two of the twelve other Communists arrested with Boloff were acquitted as a groundswell of support for Boloff and the others charged began to coalesces. The ten other prisoners were released and the charges against them were dropped.

=== Release and death ===
The Oregon Supreme Court denied a second hearing of the case, reaffirming their previous ruling that upheld the lower court's ruling. Three separate petitions were sent to the Oregon Supreme Court requesting that they rehear the case. Finally, the original trial judge suspended Boloff's sentence and he was released on his own recognizance. Boloff's tuberculosis, which he contracted at the Oregon State Penitentiary, was advanced due to the lack of treatment. He succumbed to the disease on October 12, 1932, in Portland.

Boloff's casket was raised through the streets of Portland. Given an opportunity to break-up the mourners, the mayor of Portland allowed the procession to continue without police intervention. Boloff was interred at River View Cemetery in Portland with a hammer and sickle insignia on his headstone.

After his first appeal to the Oregon Supreme Court was defeated, The Oregonian wrote an op-ed in support of Boloff's release. The editors noted that Boloff's imprisonment only strengthened the communist movement by making him a martyr for their cause. In a later op-ed entitled "Set Boloff free", The Oregonian editors urged the Governor Julius Meier to pardon him. The article details the criminal syndicalism law in Oregon, arguing it was passed around the time of World War I as an "emergency measure", but to apply it to Boloff was an abuse of power.

Death of Ben Boloff
Ben Boloff never should have been in jail. The Oregonian said so at the time, and now that he has died of tuberculosis, those who favored his arrest and opposed his liberation should be able to see that they succeed only in placing the state in an embarrassing situation since Boloff had been at liberty for several months and he was ministered to at the end at public expense. But if the unforgiving had had their way, the communists would have succeeded in maneuvering themselves into a position where they could make a great public demonstration of his death and funeral.

— editorial, The Oregonian, October 12, 1932
