= River View Cemetery (Portland, Oregon) =

Historic cemetery

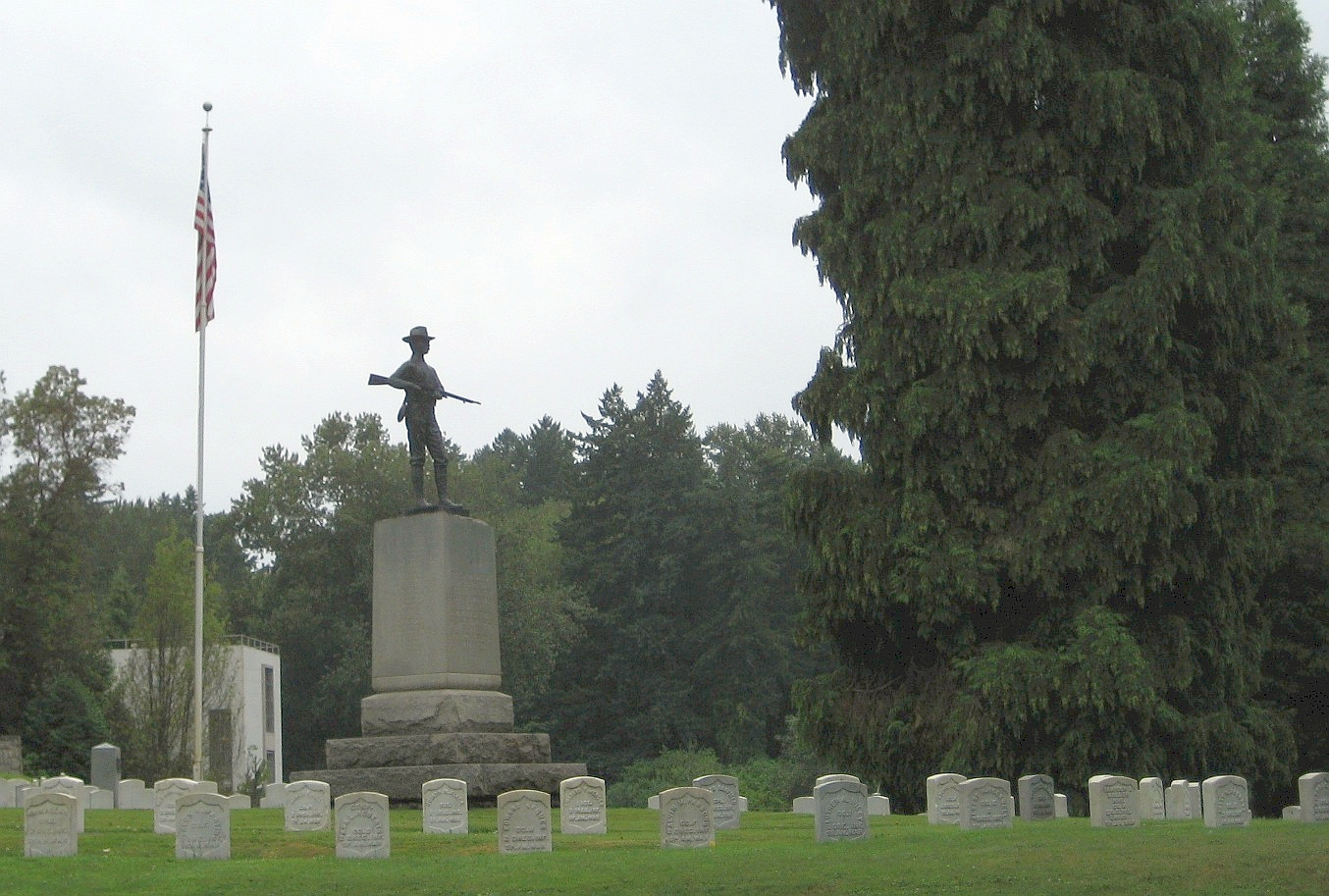
- The Spanish–American War Veterans Memorial, 2007
- Interactive map of River View Cemetery

Details
- Established: 1882; 144 years ago
- Location: Portland, Oregon
- Country: United States
- Coordinates: 45.465°N 122.673°W
- Type: Private
- Owned by: River View Cemetery Association
- Website: riverviewcemetery.org

River View Cemetery is a non-profit cemetery located in the southwest section of Portland, Oregon, United States. Founded in 1882, it is the final resting place of many prominent and notable citizens of Oregon, including many governors and members of the United States Senate.

== History ==
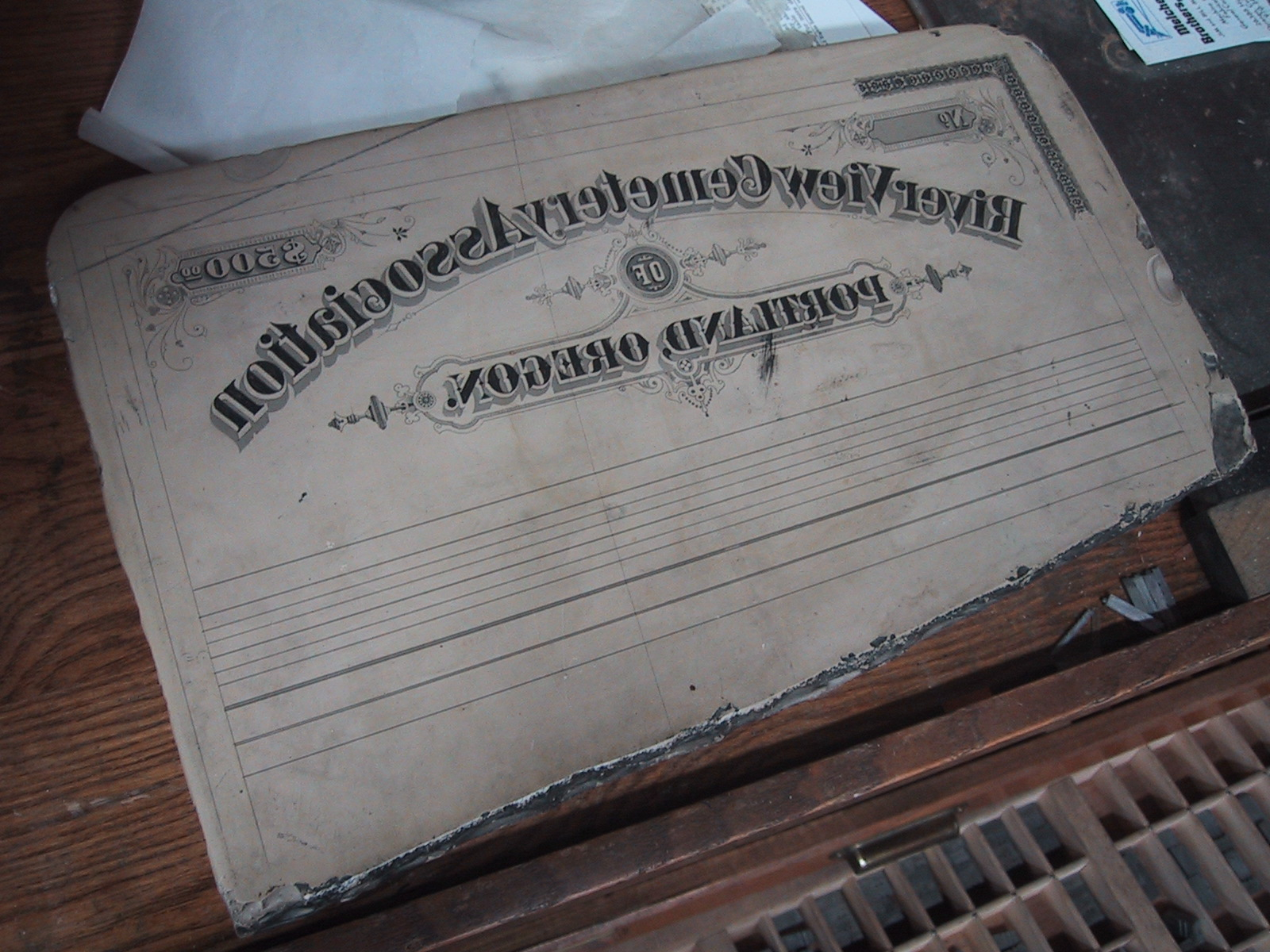
River View Cemetery Association lithographic stone used to print an early $500 bond or stock certificate.

River View Cemetery Association was founded as a non-profit cemetery by William S. Ladd, James Terwilliger, Henry Failing, Henry W. Corbett, Henry Pittock, Simon Benson, and others in 1882. All those who joined co-owned the cemetery. In 1902 a Roll Call statue was added to honor the 165 Oregonians who died in the Spanish–American War. The statue has stood for 121 years, it was stolen briefly in 2023, until it was found and returned to its post in 2024. The first adult burial was Dr. William Henry Watkins. In the 1940s a 135-person chapel was added, designed by Pietro Belluschi.

== Facilities ==
Overlooking the Willamette River, the cemetery has a variety of mausoleums including the Hilltop Garden Mausoleum and Main Mausoleum. There are also private mausoleums and crypts. River View is an endowment care cemetery as defined by the state of Oregon.

== Property and surplus land ==
River View Cemetery occupies approximately 350 acres (140 ha) on the west slope of the Willamette River, south of Downtown Portland, but approximately half of the property is not a developed cemetery. Initially, this excess land was held for future expansion of the cemetery, but demographic trends away from burial (in favor of cremation) have reduced the need for future expansion. For example, in 1973 eight percent of Oregonians chose cremation, versus 68 percent in 2010.

In 2006, the River View Cemetery Association sought to develop 184 acres (74 ha) of their surplus land into residential properties, and filed a $24 million compensation claim under the 2004 Oregon Ballot Measure 37 and 2007 Oregon Ballot Measure 49. In 2007, the River View Cemetery Association submitted an application to change the zoning of the surplus land from open space to single-family residential for 182 housing units. On May 2, 2011, the City of Portland announced that it had agreed to purchase 146 acres (59 ha) of this undeveloped surplus land for $11.25 million, which will be managed by Portland Parks & Recreation with the initial goals of habitat stabilization, removal of invasive species, and trail and access planning.

== Notable burials ==
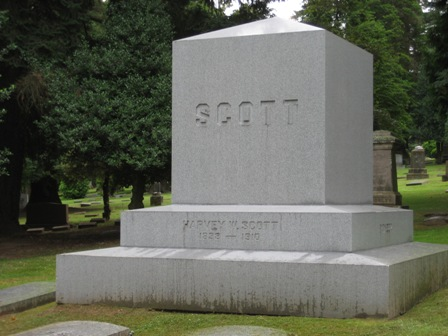
Grave of Harvey W. Scott

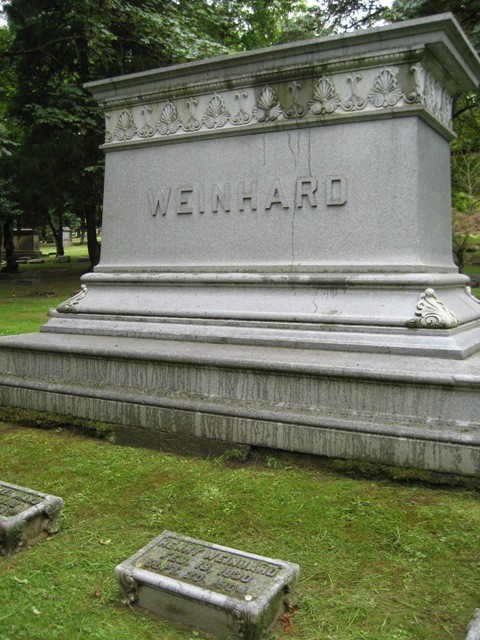
Grave of Henry Weinhard

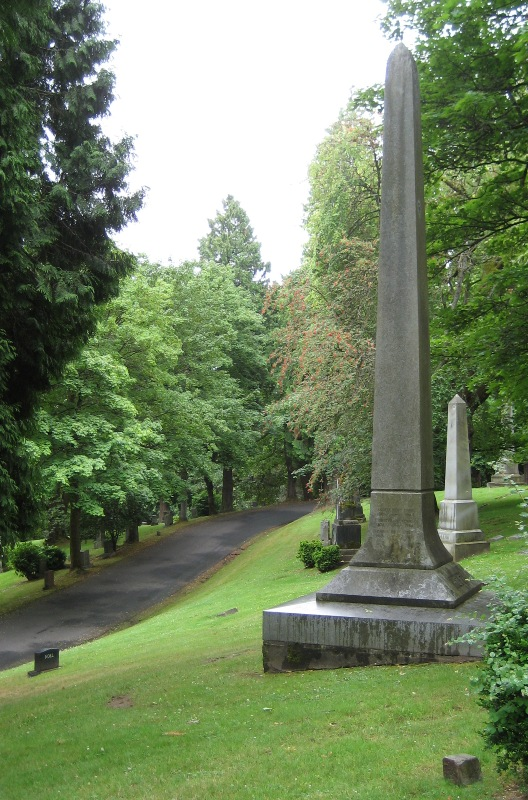
Burial marker at the cemetery

Other notable burials include Henry Weinhard's family, W.A.S.P Pilot Hazel Ying Lee, football player Lyle Alzado, baseball player Carl Mays,

- George Abernethy (1807–1877), governor of the Provisional Government of Oregon
- Victor Atiyeh (February 20, 1923 – July 20, 2014) 32nd Governor of Oregon from 1979 to 1987.
- Henry R. Adair (1882–1916), killed in combat at the Battle of Carrizal while chasing Poncho Villa.
- George F. Alexander (1882–1948), federal judge
- Lyle Alzado (1949–1992), professional football player and actor
- George H. Atkinson (1819–1889), missionary and "Father of Oregon Schools"
- Thomas E. Autzen (1918–1997), philanthropist
- Thomas J. Autzen (1888–1958), industrialist and philanthropist
- Lola Baldwin (1860–1957), first female police officer in the United States
- Robert S. Bean (1854–1931), federal judge, Oregon Supreme Court Chief Justice
- Simon Benson (1852–1942), Portland businessman and philanthropist
- Ben Boloff (1893–1932), Russian-born Communist arrested, tried and convicted of criminal syndicalism
- Bud Clark (1931–2022), mayor of Portland
- Donald Cook (1901–1961), movie and stage actor
- Henry Ladd Corbett (1881–1957), Portland businessman and politician
- Henry Winslow Corbett (1827–1903), United States Senator
- John H. Couch (1811–1870), sea captain and pioneer
- Maurice E. Crumpacker (1886–1927), United States Congressman
- Joseph N. Dolph (1835–1897), United States Senator
- Abigail Scott Duniway (1834–1915), women's rights pioneer
- Virgil Earp (1843–1905), lawman and brother of Wyatt Earp
- Joseph Horace Eaton (1815–1896), artist and Civil War general
- Henry Failing (1834–1898), mayor of Portland
- Robert S. Farrell Jr. (c.1906–1947), Oregon Secretary of State
- A. C. Gibbs (1825–1886), Oregon Governor
- Alan Punch Green Jr. (1925–2001), United States Ambassador to Romania
- La Fayette Grover (1823–1911), Oregon Governor
- John Hicklin Hall (1854–1937), United States Attorney, Oregon legislator
- Rufus C. Holman (1877–1959), United States Senator
- Nan Wood Honeyman (1881–1970), United States Congresswoman
- James Jackson (1833–1916), Medal of Honor recipient
- Jacob Kamm (1823–1912), shipping magnate, founder of Oregon Steam Navigation Company
- Albertina Kerr (1890–1911), orphanage namesake
- William S. Ladd (1826–1893), mayor of Portland
- Roswell Lamson (1838–1903), Civil War navy hero
- Dorothy McCullough Lee (1902–1981), first female mayor of Portland
- Hazel Ying Lee (1912–1944), Chinese-American pilot during World War II
- Charles Henry Martin (1863–1946), Oregon Governor
- Carl Mays (1891–1971), Major League Baseball pitcher
- Wallace McCamant (1867–1944), United States Court of Appeals judge
- John H. Mitchell (1835–1905), United States Senator
- Frederick W. Mulkey (1874–1924), United States Senator
- Paul L. Patterson (1900–1956), Oregon Governor
- Sylvester Pennoyer (1831–1902), Oregon Governor
- Henry Pittock (1836–1919), publisher of The Oregonian newspaper
- Harvey W. Scott (1838–1910), editor of The Oregonian newspaper
- Isaac W. Smith (1826–1897), Portland Pioneer, first Chief Engineer, "father" of Portland's water system
- Joseph Showalter Smith (1824–1884), United States Congressman
- Lansing Stout (1828–1871), United States Congressman
- Owen Summers (1850–1911), soldier, Oregon legislator
- James Terwilliger (d. 1892), Portland pioneer, street namesake
- Mandana Coleman Thorp (1843–1916), American Civil War nurse, singer, patriot; public official
- Thomas Jones Thorp (1837–1915), Union Army officer and husband of Mandana Coleman Thorp
- Frances Fuller Victor (1826–1902), writer and historian
- Frank M. Warren Sr. (1848–1912), millionaire and salmon cannery prominent businessman. Died in the sinking of RMS Titanic
- Henry Weinhard (1830–1904), brewer and Portland businessman
- George A. White (1880–1941), journalist, Oregon Adjutant General, a founder of the American Legion
- Narcissa Edith White Kinney (1851–1901), temperance worker
- George Henry Williams (1823–1910), United States Attorney General
- Richard Williams (1836–1914), United States Congressman
- George L. Woods (1832–1890), Oregon Governor
