= Proposed Major League Baseball franchises in Portland, Oregon =

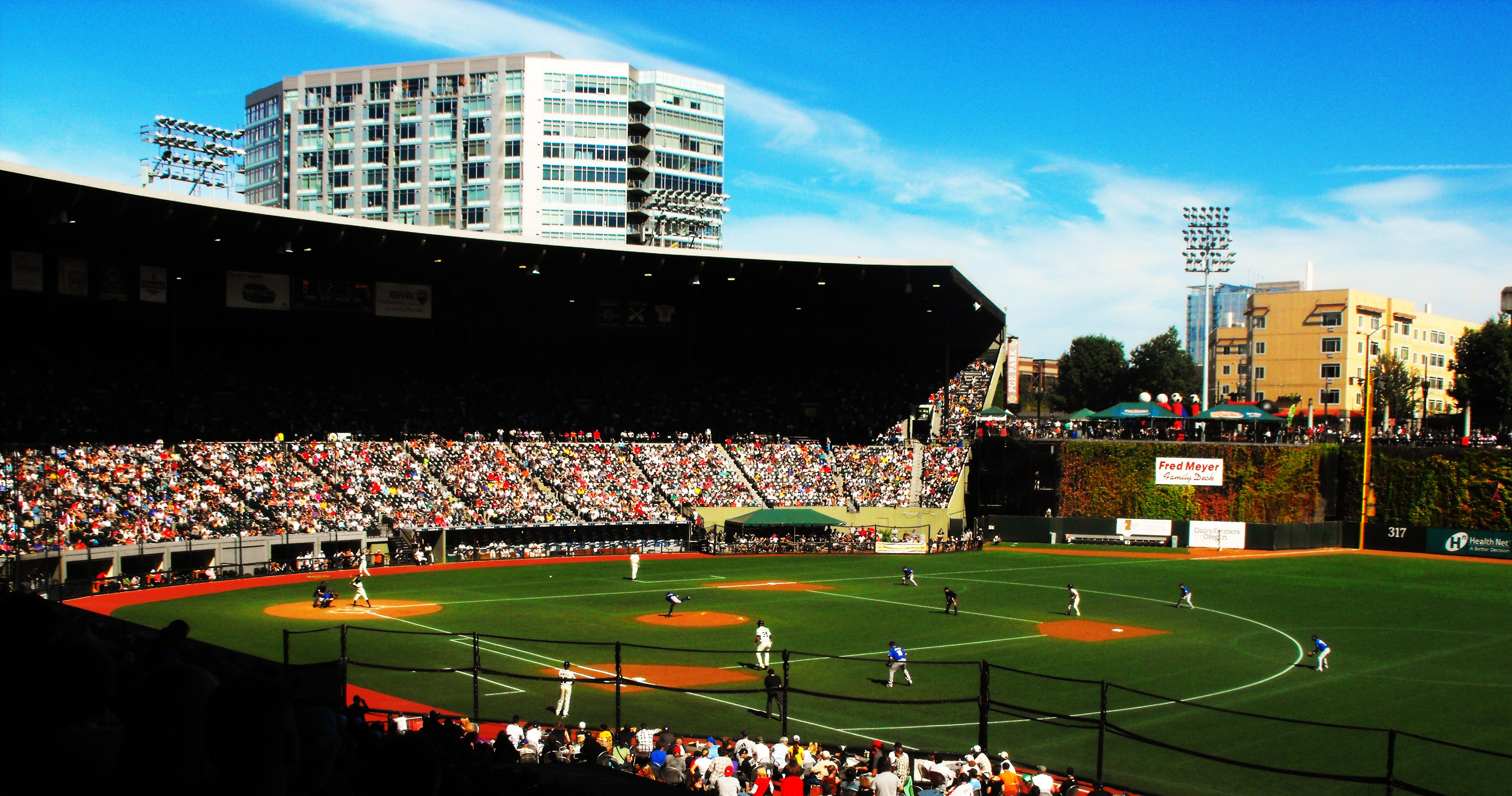
Under two proposals in the 2000s, if any Major League Baseball franchises relocated to Portland, Oregon, they would have played at PGE Park on an interim basis.

Major League Baseball (MLB) franchises have been proposed in Portland, Oregon on two occasions. The Oregon Stadium Campaign and the City of Portland were involved in creating a presentation for a committee in charge of relocating the Montreal Expos in 2003. The proposal included possible sites for new baseball parks. In the midst of the campaign for the Expos, the Oregon State Legislature passed a bill that secured $150 million in funds for a new stadium, that can still be used. The proposal was passed up, and Washington, D.C. was selected as the new home of the franchise. In 2007, the Florida Marlins considered re-locating to Portland. On both occasions, PGE Park, the minor league baseball park at the time, would have been used until a new stadium could be completed. The Portland metropolitan area is one of the largest metro areas in the United States without an MLB franchise.

== Proposed teams ==
=== Montreal Expos relocation (2002–2003) ===
After MLB made it official the Montreal Expos were going to be relocated, Portland was named as a potential candidate. Then-Portland Mayor Vera Katz and other officials went to New York City to address the committee that was in charge of the Expos relocation. In 2003, the Oregon State Legislature passed Senate Bill 5, which provided US$150 million towards a new stadium. If the Expos did move to Portland, under the proposal set forth by the then-mayor would use PGE Park as the team's temporary stadium. The Expos were eventually awarded to Washington, D.C. and now play as the Washington Nationals.

=== Florida Marlins possible relocation (2006–2007) ===
In 2006, there was question of whether or not the Florida Marlins would be able to secure the funds for a new stadium. This opened a proposal for the Marlins to be relocated to Portland. Former professional baseball player Johnny Pesky, who is a Portland native, expressed his desire to see an MLB franchise in his home town stating, "Why shouldn't Portland have a club? I think they should get a shot. I think Portland will have a team in three or four years." The proposed plan would use the funds secured from Senate Bill 5 to build a new stadium. While it was being built, the team would play in PGE Park, which would be expanded into a 25,000 seat facility as a quick fix. On January 6, 2006, Marlins officials visited Portland as a possible re-location site. The officials included team president David Samson, vice chairman Joel Mael, and Claude Delorme. Las Vegas was also seen as a possible new home for the Marlins. The Marlins ultimately stayed in Miami and went on to build LoanDepot Park, which opened in 2012.

=== Pre-2020 Projects ===
In 2017, MLB commissioner Rob Manfred announced that an ownership group led by retired Nike vice president Craig Cheek and former Portland Trail Blazers broadcaster Mike Barrett are working to secure financing for a stadium and bring a major league team to Portland. On April 17, 2018, the potential ownership group, Portland Diamond Project (PDP), submitted formal proposals to purchase one of two potential stadium sites close to downtown Portland. One site was Portland Public Schools' headquarters, located north of the Moda Center, and the other location is an industrial site in Northwest Portland However, on November 7, 2018, PDP formally retracted its offer for the PPS site.

On June 1, 2018 it was announced that former Seattle Seahawks quarterback, current New York Giants quarterback, and former Colorado Rockies farmhand Russell Wilson is investing in the Portland Diamond Project, along with his wife, entertainer Ciara. In 2019, former MLB player and Portland native Darwin Barney also invested in the project.

On November 29, 2018, PDP announced that it had reached an agreement to build a baseball park on the 45-acre Terminal 2 of the Port of Portland in the Northwest Industrial neighborhood of the city. The park, designed by Populous in partnership with TVA Architects, would be located on the Willamette River. It would have a capacity of 32,000 to 34,000 and would include a retractable roof as well as a gondola lift suite. Construction was estimated to cost around $1 billion, and efforts to get an MLB team to occupy it could cost the same.

In 2023, PDP announced that it was now considering two potential sites for a ballpark: the Lloyd Center shopping mall just northeast of downtown Portland and the Redtail Golf Course in Beaverton. In January 2024, they announced they were in negotiations to purchase the 164-acre Redtail site.

=== Zidell Yards Proposal ===
On September 23, 2024, PDP announced that they had signed a letter of intent to purchase Zidell Yards, a large piece of undeveloped land in the South Waterfront neighborhood.

In June 2025, Oregon governor Tina Kotek signed SB110 which authorizes the state to set aside $800 million for the construction of a baseball stadium if Portland is awarded a franchise. The money would be repaid by income taxes on players and staff.

In March 2025, Portland Diamond Project released architectural renderings showing what a potential new MLB ballpark along the Willamette River in Portland's South Waterfront neighborhood could look like.

== Market ==
The Portland metropolitan area was a bigger market than several with current MLB teams, namely the Cincinnati Reds, Kansas City Royals, and Milwaukee Brewers. As of 2022, the Portland metropolitan area had 2.5 million residents and was the fifth largest metropolitan statistical area in the United States without an MLB team. While the Oregon Sports Authority acknowledged in its official proposal that there may be bigger markets with more corporate support, it touted Portland's natural beauty, livability, population growth, and television ratings as reason to award Portland with a team.

== Previously involved organizations ==
Three groups, the Oregon Sports Authority, the Portland Baseball Group, and Oregon Baseball Campaign, came together for an organization known as the Oregon Stadium Campaign (OSC) to advance the hopes of location an MLB team in Portland.

== Public opinion ==
The Oregon Sports Authority cited a poll taken by Grove Insight in March 2003 in its official proposal that stated that more than half of Oregon residents said they would attend an MLB game each season. Furthermore, the poll also stated that 60 percent of Multnomah County residents would be "likely" to attend a game and 41 percent would be "very likely."

== See also ==
- History of baseball in Portland, Oregon
