= Thomas J. Autzen House =

Historic building in Portland, Oregon, U.S.

- U.S. National Register of Historic Places
- Portland Historic Landmark
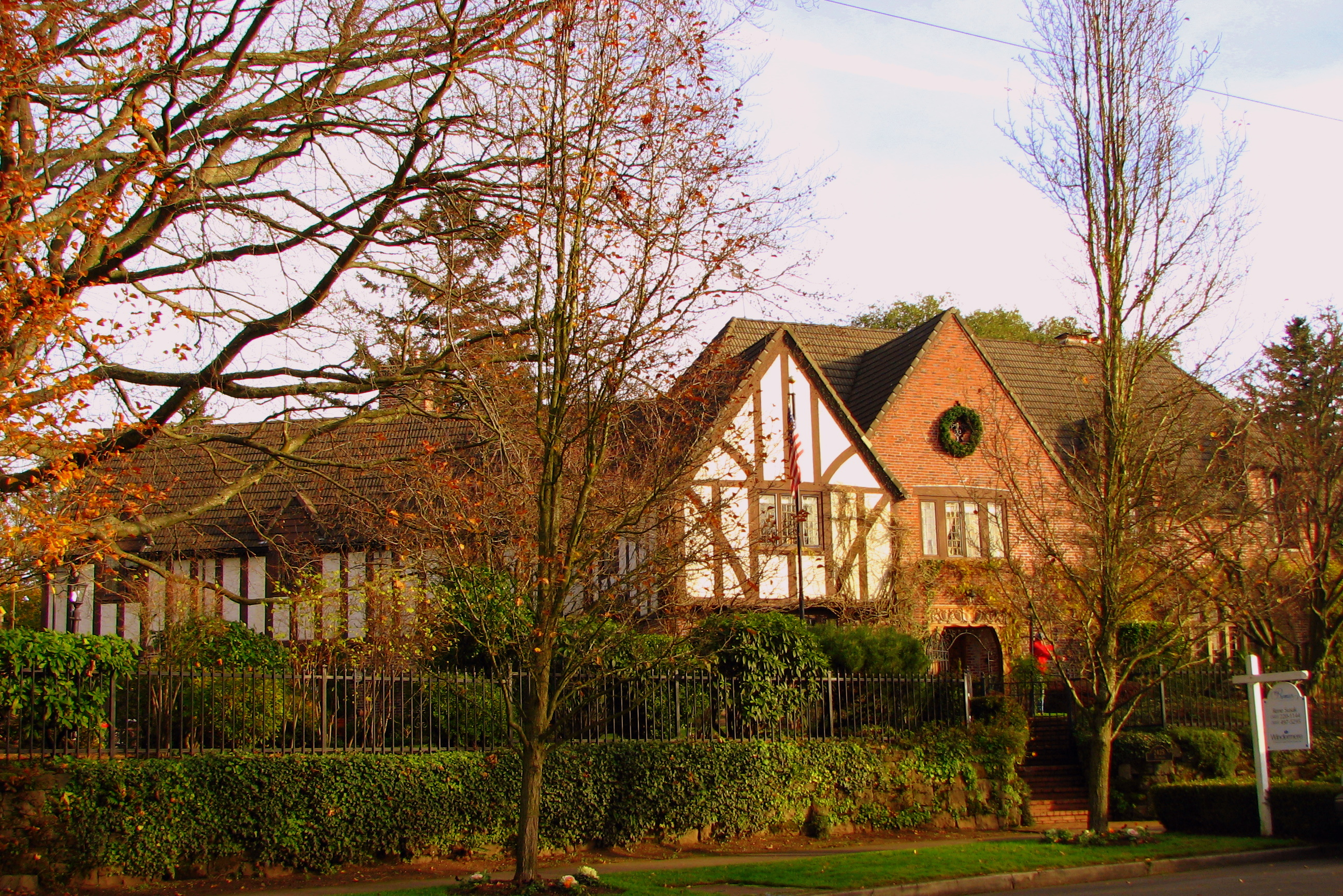
- Thomas J. Autzen House in 2009

- Location within Portland, Oregon
- Location: 2425 NE Alameda Street; Portland, Oregon
- Coordinates: 45°33′06″N 122°38′26″W
- Area: 0.7 acres (0.28 ha)
- Built: 1927
- Architect: Kirtland K. Cutter
- Architectural style: Tudor Revival
- NRHP reference No.: 92000088
- Added to NRHP: March 9, 1992

The Thomas J. Autzen House is an historic house located in northeast Portland, Oregon.

The Tudor Revival style house was built in 1927, and was added to the National Register of Historic Places on March 9, 1992.

== See also ==
- Thomas J. Autzen
- National Register of Historic Places listings in Northeast Portland, Oregon
