= Zidell Yards =

Former industrial waterfront

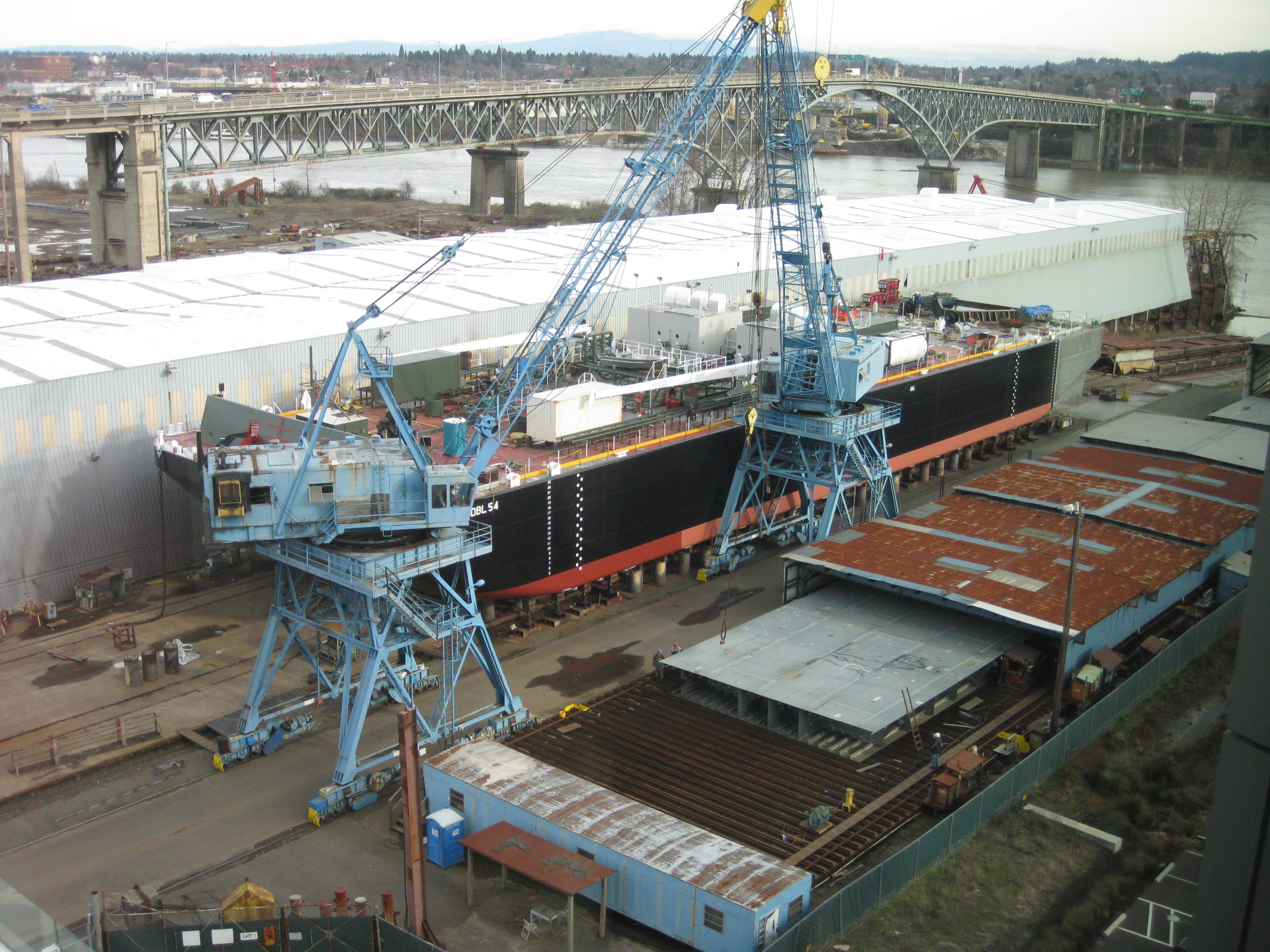
- Zidell Yards in 2010
- Area: 33 acres (13 ha)
- Owner: Zidell family
- Location: Portland, Oregon, U.S.
- Address: 3030 South Moody Avenue; Portland, OR 97201
- Location within Portland, Oregon
- Coordinates: 45°30′6″N 122°40′9″W

Zidell Yards is a former industrial waterfront in Portland, Oregon's South Portland neighborhood, in the United States. The site is notable for being one of the only large undeveloped plots of land in or near Downtown. Zidell Yards is owned by the Zidell family.

== The Lot at Zidell Yards ==
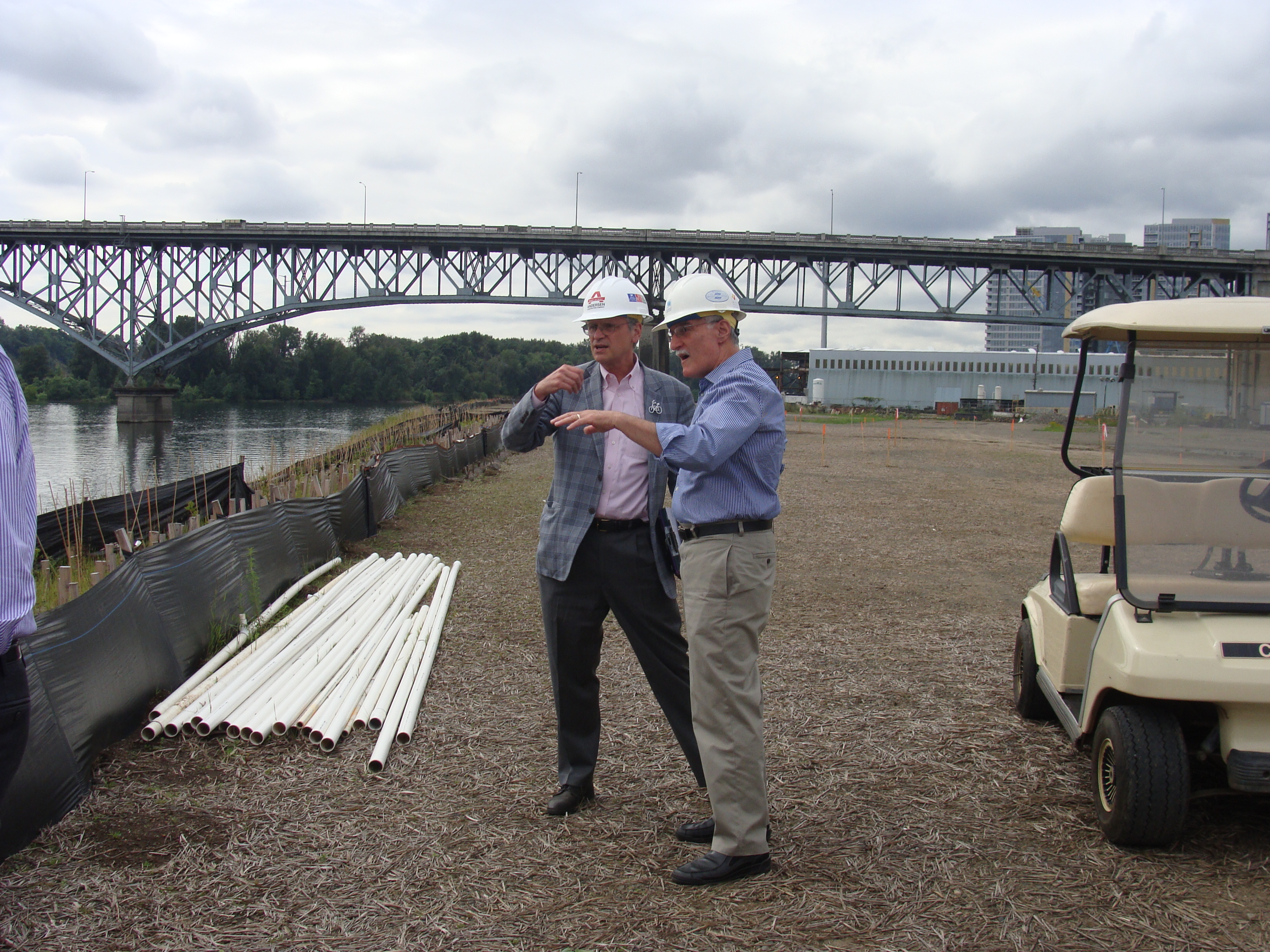
Congressman Earl Blumenauer with Jay Zidell at Zidell Yards, 2012

In 2021, during the COVID-19 pandemic, Zidell Yards was leased by Fuller Events LLC as a temporary event venue they called The Lot at Zidell Yards. It hosted multiple events including drive-in drag performances featuring Darcelle XV and the Waterfront Blues Festival.

At the end of the year, it was announced that Fuller Events would not renew the lease and would instead focus on other events in Downtown.

== Proposed baseball stadium ==
On September 23, 2024, the Portland Diamond Project, a group seeking to bring Major League Baseball (MLB) to Portland, announced that they had signed a letter of intent to purchase the property in order to build a ballpark.

In March 2025, Portland Diamond Project released architectural renderings showing what a potential new MLB ballpark along the Willamette River in Portland's South Waterfront neighborhood could look like.
