= Joseph Horace Eaton =

United States Army general

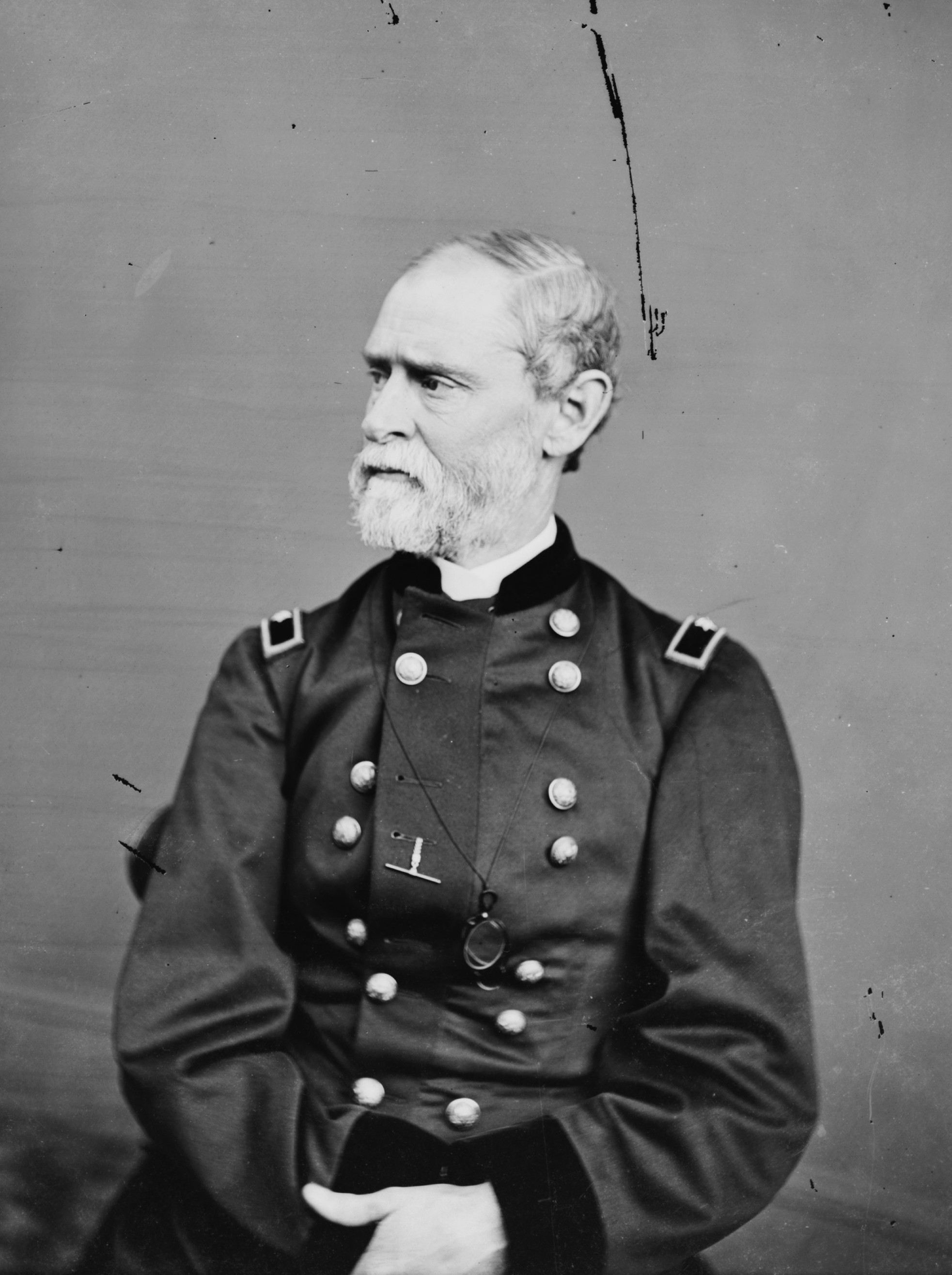
- Joseph H. Eaton
- Born: October 12, 1815; Salem, Massachusetts
- Died: January 20, 1896 (aged 80); Portland, Oregon
- Burial place: River View Cemetery
- Military career
- Allegiance: United States of America; Union
- Branch: United States Army; Union Army
- Service years: 1835–1856, 1861-1881
- Rank: Major; Bvt. Brigadier General
- Conflicts: Mexican–American War; Battle of Palo Alto; Battle of Resaca de la Palma; Battle of Monterrey; Battle of Buena Vista; American Civil War
- Other work: Artist

Joseph Horace Eaton (October 12, 1815 – January 20, 1896) was an American artist and a career officer in the United States Army (Regular Army). He served as a major during the American Civil War. In recognition of his service, in 1866 he was nominated and in 1867 he was confirmed for appointment to the grade of brevet brigadier general in the regular army to rank from March 13, 1865.

== Early life ==
Eaton was born in Salem, Massachusetts. He graduated from West Point in 1835. During the Mexican–American War he was an aide to Gen. Zachary Taylor and was twice brevetted and cited for gallantry, first at the Battle of Monterey and then at the Battle of Buena Vista. Following the Mexican War, Eaton was stationed on the frontier where he painted a series of landscapes in New Mexico in the 1850s. Those paintings are highly sought after by art collectors and museums today and even Eaton's autograph is sold at auction. Among his most important watercolors are Don Fernandez de Taos and Canoncito Bonito.

== Civil War ==
At the start of the American Civil War, Eaton was aide-de-camp and military secretary to Maj. Gen. John C. Frémont and was paymaster of the Department of Kansas. He later was stationed in Washington, D.C., where he was assistant U.S. paymaster. On December 11, 1866, President Andrew Johnson nominated Eaton for appointment to the grade of brevet brigadier general in the regular army, to rank from March 13, 1865, and the United States Senate confirmed the appointment on February 23, 1867.

== Postbellum career ==
After the Civil War Eaton was assigned to Fort Vancouver where he was the Army's Chief Paymaster of the Department of the Columbia until his retirement in 1881. The son of Dr. Joseph Eaton, he married the former Susan Blaney in 1845. He died in Portland, Oregon, and is buried in River View Cemetery.

== See also ==
- List of American Civil War brevet generals (Union)
