= Warrendale, Oregon =

Unincorporated community in the state of Oregon, United States

Coordinates: 45.612617°N 122.015639°W

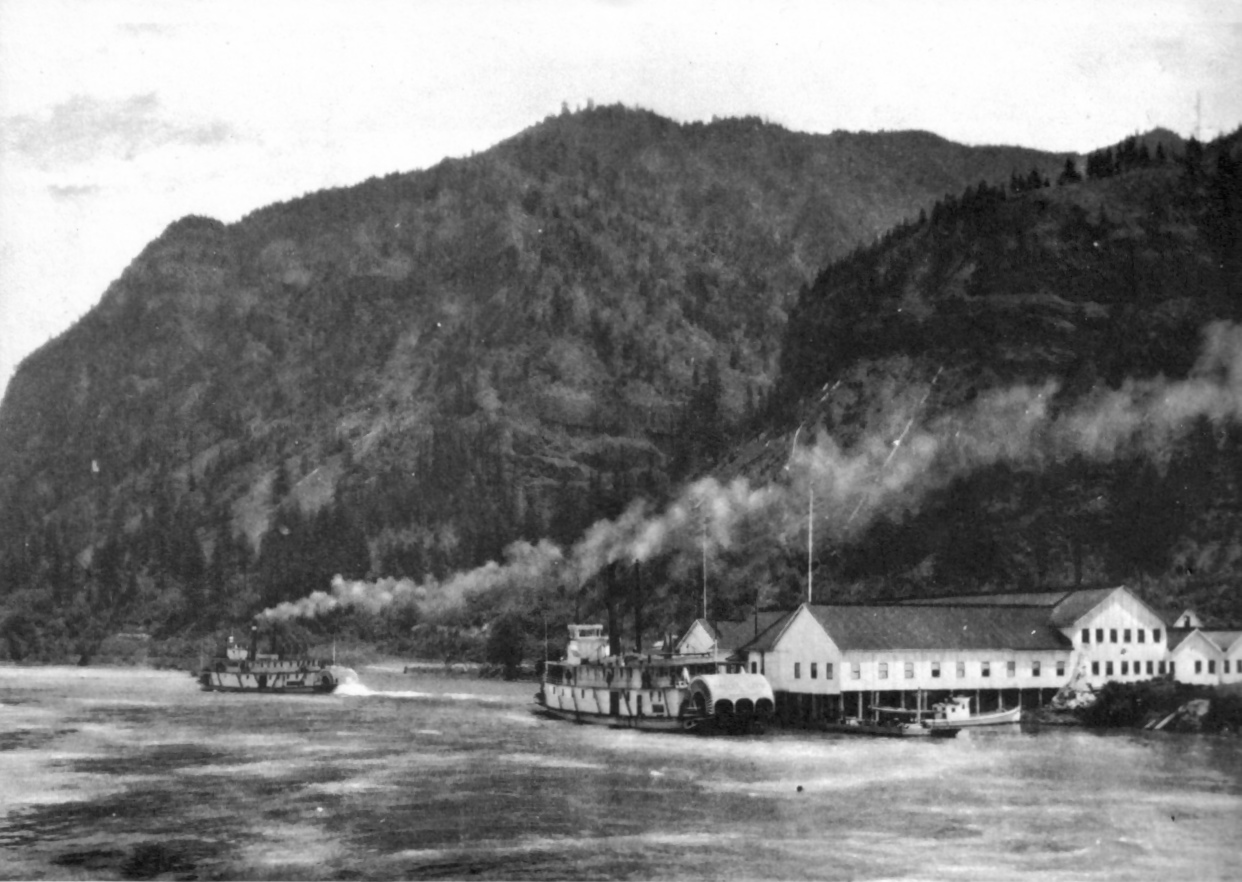
The sternwheelers Tahoma (moving upstream) and Dalles City (at dock), at the Warren salmon cannery in 1902. Photo by Benjamin A. Gifford.

Warrendale is an unincorporated community in Multnomah County, Oregon, United States. It is located about a mile east of Dodson and about 3 miles (4.8 km) west of Bonneville in the Columbia River Gorge on Interstate 84/U.S. Route 30. It is across the Columbia River from Beacon Rock. The community was the site of an important salmon cannery founded in the 1870s.

== History ==
Warrendale was named for Frank M. Warren Sr., a prominent Portland citizen and a pioneer of the salmon canning industry in Oregon. Warren died in the sinking of the Titanic in April 1912.

Warrendale post office ran from 1894 to 1942; today the community is within the Cascade Locks ZIP code. Warrendale station on the Oregon-Washington Railroad & Navigation Company line (today owned by Union Pacific) was established in 1916.

In 1915, the community had two salmon canneries, a large pulp and paper mill, and a public school, none of which remained by 1990. Warrendale students later attended Bonneville Grade School in Dodson, which closed in 1996. A salmon cannery established here in 1870 was the most prominent along the mid-Columbia River at that time. Frank Warren's cannery used a fish wheel upstream at Hamilton Island on the Washington side of the river to harvest salmon, which were transported down the island using a tramway, the remnants of which are still located in Fort Cascades Historic Site. The fish were then transported across the river to Warrendale for processing. The tramway operated until 1930, and fish wheels were outlawed in Washington in 1934. Warren also owned a cannery in Cathlamet, Washington.

In the 1930s, Warrendale was considered as a site for the Bonneville Dam, eventually built a few miles upstream at Bonneville.

In February 1996, a series of massive debris flows, resulting from the same severe weather that caused flooding in the Willamette Valley, occurred between Dodson and Warrendale, destroying homes and blocking the railroad and I-84 for several days.

== Notable people ==
Warrendale was the home of Frederick H. Kiser, an early Oregon photographer, who, with his brother Oscar H. Kiser, established Kiser Scenic Photo Studio there in 1903. The company moved to Portland in 1905; Oscar died in November of that year. The Kiser brothers' parents owned the Columbia Beach Hotel and Nursery in Warrendale. Fred H. Kiser was the official photographer for the Lewis and Clark Centennial Exposition, and was noted for his images of Crater Lake and his promotional work for the Great Northern Railway.

== See also ==
- Steamboats of the Columbia River
