= Thomas E. Autzen =

American philanthropist (1918–1997)

- Born: April 12, 1918; Portland, Oregon
- Died: November 29, 1997 (aged 79); Portland, Oregon
- Resting place: River View Cemetery; Portland, Oregon
- Education: University of Oregon, 1943
- Occupation: Businessman
- Parent: Thomas J. Autzen (father) (1888–1958)

Thomas Edward Autzen (April 12, 1918 – November 29, 1997) was an American philanthropist based in Oregon, the eldest son of Thomas J. Autzen. He received a national reputation for his philanthropy and as an active member in many Pacific Northwest charitable organizations. After his father's death in 1958, he presided over the Autzen Foundation and helped manage operations as a spokesperson and board member.

== Early life and education ==
A lifelong resident of Portland, Oregon, Autzen is best known as the son of famous northwest plywood manufacturing innovator and namesake of the University of Oregon football stadium, Thomas J. Autzen. He received a bachelor's degree in political science from the University of Oregon in 1943 where he was a member of Kappa Sigma fraternity. His attendance at the university led his father to create the Autzen Foundation as a fundraiser for construction of the school's football stadium.

== Philanthropy ==
As president and board member of the Autzen Foundation, he is recognized for helping distribute many large donations to charitable organizations located mainly in Oregon. The foundation's focus, while under his and his father's leadership, has been to help youth services, education, the arts and nature. Autzen also chaired and participated as a board member in a number of other prominent Oregon philanthropic and non-profit organizations. Autzen chaired the University of Oregon Foundation, he also served on the boards of the Japanese Garden Society, the High Desert Museum, the Columbia River Maritime Museum, Pacific Crest Outward Bound and Good Samaritan Hospital.
