= Thomas J. Autzen =

Danish-American philanthropist (1888–1958)

- Born: June 8, 1888; Hoquiam, Washington, U.S.
- Died: September 8, 1958 (aged 70); Portland, Oregon, U.S.
- Resting place: River View Cemetery
- Education: Oregon State University
- Occupations: Businessman, electrical engineer
- Children: 5, including Thomas E. Autzen

Thomas John Autzen (June 8, 1888 – September 8, 1958) was a Danish-American pioneer in plywood manufacturing, and founder of a family-run philanthropic foundation known as the Autzen Foundation, based in Portland, Oregon. The Autzen Foundation supplied the single largest donation, US$250,000, to support the construction of the football stadium at the University of Oregon in Eugene that bears his name. Construction began in 1966, eight years after his death, and was completed in 1967. Autzen's heirs, led by his son Thomas E. Autzen, operated the foundation after his death, per the terms of his will.

Although his name is popularly associated with Autzen Stadium in Eugene, Autzen was an alumnus of today's Oregon State University in Corvallis. His foundation's donation to the University of Oregon was as a parent; his eldest son Thomas E. graduated from UO in 1943.

Through their Portland Manufacturing Company, Autzen and his family helped revolutionize wood-laminate milling methods still in use today. These discoveries, which were engineered and utilized at the Autzen plants, had an enormous impact on modern building methods and helped radically change plywood production throughout the industry.

== Early years ==
Born to Danish immigrants in the bayside town of Hoquiam, Washington, Autzen grew up around logging. His father Peter (1854–1918) spent his early adult life working successfully as a logger through much of the late 1800s. In 1902, Peter purchased an established Northwest wood products mill, originally known as Doernbecher and Holbrook. Once the Autzen family took over management, they renamed the mill "Portland Manufacturing Company." Under Peter's leadership, management at the St. Johns-based mill began pioneering some of the nation's earliest known, mass-produced, plywood panels. A self-engineered glue spreader, which allowed "plys" of wood to easily bond during mass-production, helped drive production levels to a new high. Thomas J. Autzen and the mill's superintendent, Oscar Mason, are credited with developing the device and marketing it into the company's greatest asset.

Autzen graduated from Oregon State University in 1909 with a degree in electrical engineering. Autzen became active in university campus life and joined several clubs, including the Amicitia Literary Society, the Orange staff, the Associated Students, and the college branch of the American Institute of Electrical Engineers.

== Family business ==
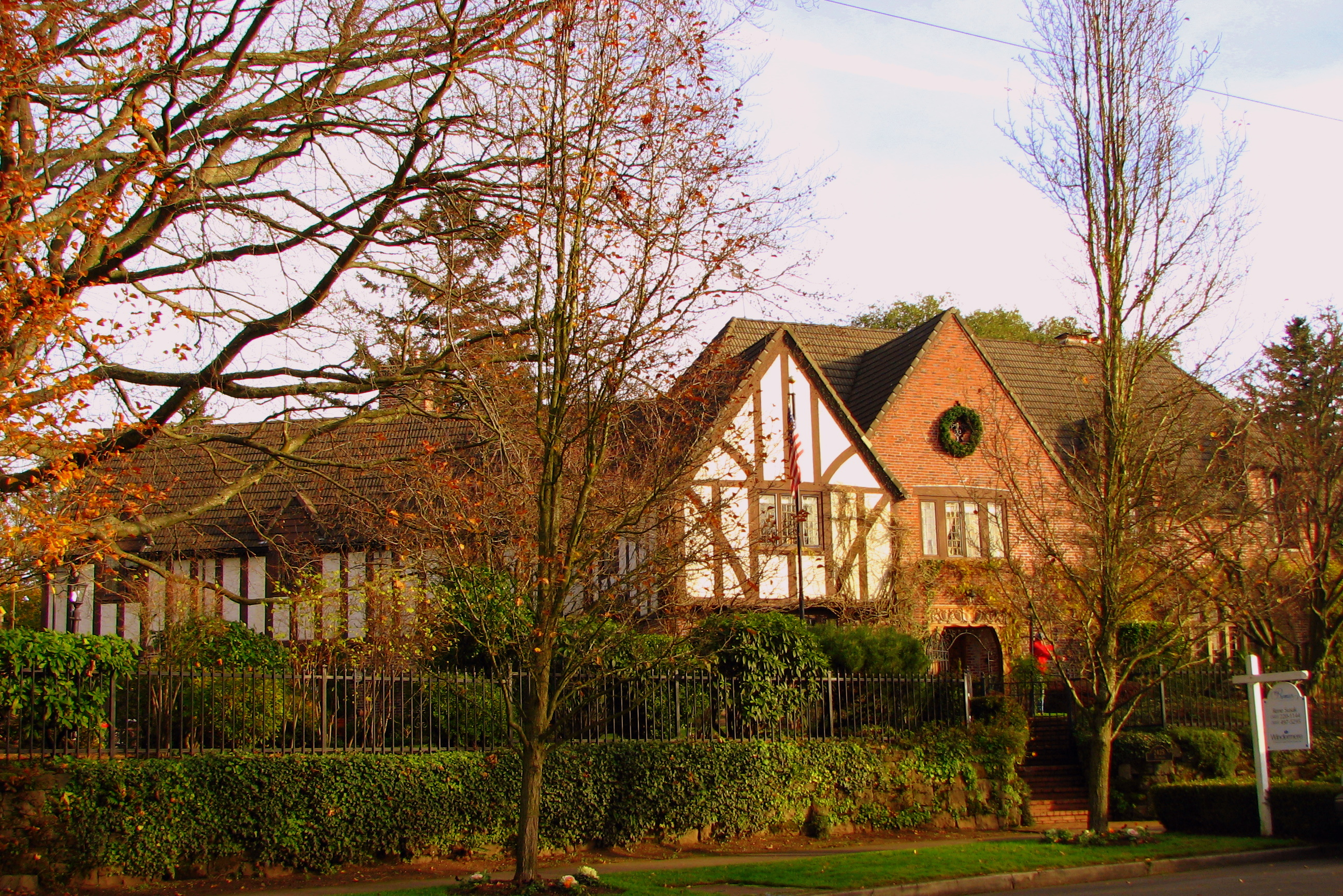
The historic Thomas J. Autzen House on 2425 Northeast Alameda in Portland

Autzen took over management of the family business following the untimely death of his father in 1918. Perhaps, his greatest contributions were in the area of sales and business administration. He played a leading role in resurrecting a company subsidiary from a devastating fire, which completely destroyed the plant's milling operations. As president, he is also credited with growing the family's milling businesses into one of the Northwest's largest suppliers of plywood and helping develop widely used modern plywood bonding technologies.

During the midst of America's Great Depression, sales had plummeted at Portland Manufacturing Company and, as with most businesses during this period, profits were slow to recover. Autzen opted to negotiate a profit-sharing deal with M and M Woodworking Company, which allowed him to retire his day-to-day management responsibilities. Over the next 20 years the family maintained an interest in M and M Woodworking Company, but this organization saw many changes in leadership and growth. M and M Woodworking Company became somewhat of a conglomeration, made up of multiple Northwest-area wood products companies. The family's interest in the organization was sold to Simpson Timber Company in 1956.

== Death ==
On September 8, 1958, after a fishing trip to Astoria earlier in the day, Autzen felt ill after dinner and was taken to Good Samaritan Hospital in Portland, where he died at age 70. He was buried at River View Cemetery in Portland.

== See also ==
- Thomas J. Autzen House
