= California Historical Landmarks in Yolo County =

This list includes properties and districts listed on the California Historical Landmark listing in Yolo County, California. Click the "Map of all coordinates" link to the right to view a Google map of all properties and districts with latitude and longitude coordinates in the table below.

Image		Landmark name	Location	City or town	Summary
Gable Mansion	864	Gable Mansion	659 First St. 38°40′21″N 121°46′22″W	Woodland	
First Pacific Coast Salmon Cannery	1040	First Pacific Coast Salmon Cannery	Sacramento River, opposite foot of K St. 38°34′59″N 121°30′32″W	West Sacramento	NRHP from April 6, 1964 to July 14, 2004.
Woodland Opera House	851	Woodland Opera House	340 2nd St. 38°40′40″N 121°46′15″W	Woodland	Also on the NRHP list as NPS-71000212

== See also ==
- List of California Historical Landmarks
- National Register of Historic Places listings in Yolo County, California
