= Hapgood-Hume Company =

Historical place in Yolo County, California

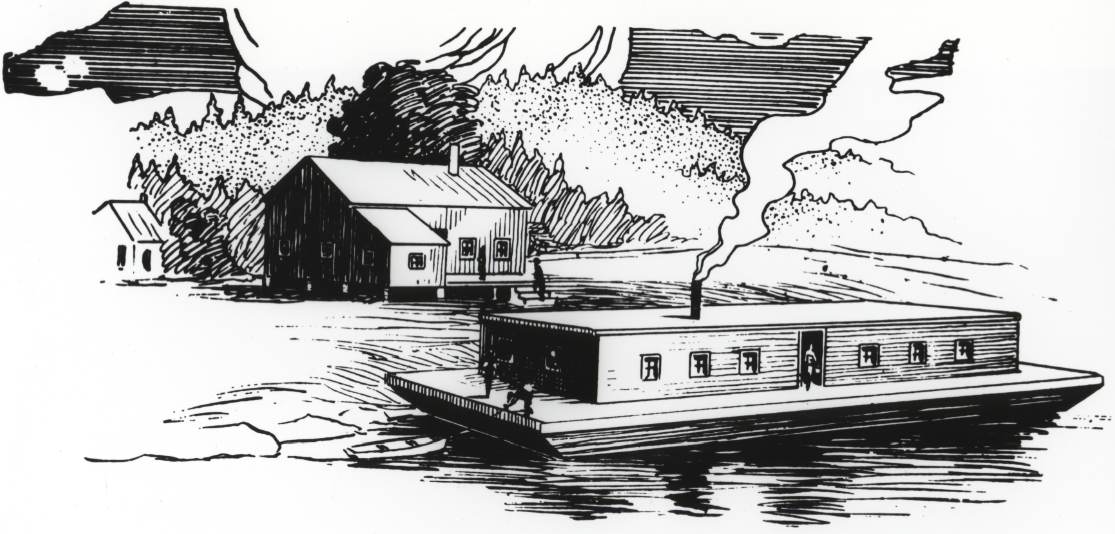
- The first salmon cannery in North America, Hapgood-Hume, was founded 1864 on a Sacramento River barge.

- Location within California Location within the United States
- 38.58312°N 121.50896°W
- Location: Sacramento River, West Sacramento, California

History
- Built: 1864, 162 years ago

Site notes
- Architect: Hume brothers
- Architectural style: Cannery barge

California Historical Landmark
- Designated: April 1, 2009
- Reference no.: 1040

Hapgood-Hume Company was a Salmon cannery and now a historical site in West Sacramento, California in Yolo County. The site of the former Hapgood-Hume Company is a California Historical Landmark No. 1040 listed on April 1, 2009. The Hapgood-Hume Company was the First Pacific Coast Salmon Cannery founded on April 1, 1864, on the Sacramento River, closed in 1873 in Washington state. The site of the Hapgood-Hume Company was a National Register of Historic Places, #66000938, from April 6, 1964, to July 14, 2004. The Hapgood-Hume Company was formed by Robert Deniston Hume, William Hume, John Hume, and George Hume, with a friend Andrew Hapgood. All of founders of the company came from Maine. Hapgood had been a tinsmith and a fisherman in Maine, arriving in California in 1864.

== History ==
William Hume came to California in 1852, in 1856 his brothers joined him in California. Hume Brothers started by selling fresh and salted fish during the California Gold Rush. With the skills of Andrew Hapgood they set up a canning company. In 1864 the site of the Hapgood-Hume salmon cannery was located in the town of Washington, now called Broderick, now in West Sacramento. The small salmon cannery operated was built on a barge that docked on the Sacramento River. At that time abundant salmon, mostly Chinook, were caught in the Sacramento River and bought to the Hapgood-Hume salmon cannery. Before the salmon cannery most salmon was preserved by either drying or salting. The salmon cannery preserved the fish in cooker-boiler that took just one hour to cook at 230 °F, faster than drying or salting. Refrigeration would not come till years later. Sacramento River saw a decline in salmon by 1866. So in 1866 the Hapgood-Hume salmon cannery moved to a site 50 miles inland on Columbia River in Washington at Eagle Cliff in eastern Wahkiakum County and lower Rogue River in Oregon. In 1867, George Hume departed the Hapgood-Hume Company and joined with Isaac Smith in opening a second cannery in Eagle Cliff. After the founding of the Smith cannery, Robert Hume departed Hapgood-Hume Company and joined them. In 1870, William and Andrew Hapgood sold the Hapgood-Hume Company Eagle Cliff cannery to Robert. In 1873 the Hume-Smith company sold the two cannery operations and moved to Bay View, Washington to open a new cannery. By 1872, the Hume Brothers had opened a few more salmon cannery operates. Hume Brothers expanded by having local Native Americans fish for the salmon and hiring Chinese in the cannery. At its peak in 1882, there were 20 salmon canneries along the Sacramento River and American River.

The decline in salmon on the Sacramento River was due to overfishing, hydraulic mining, dredge mining, logging, and the new building of railroads and dams. By 1886, all 20 salmon canneries along the Sacramento River moved to either Oregon or Alaska.

A First Pacific Coast Salmon Cannery historical marker was place on the banks of the Sacramento River, opposite foot of K Street in West Sacramento. The marker was placed there by California State Parks, River Cats Foundation, West Sacramento Historical Society, City of West Sacramento, and the West Sacramento Chamber of Commerce on April 1, 2009. The National Register of Historic Places listings marker is gone, due to floods and construction along the river banks. The National Historic Landmark listing was withdrawn on July 14, 2004.

== Gallery ==
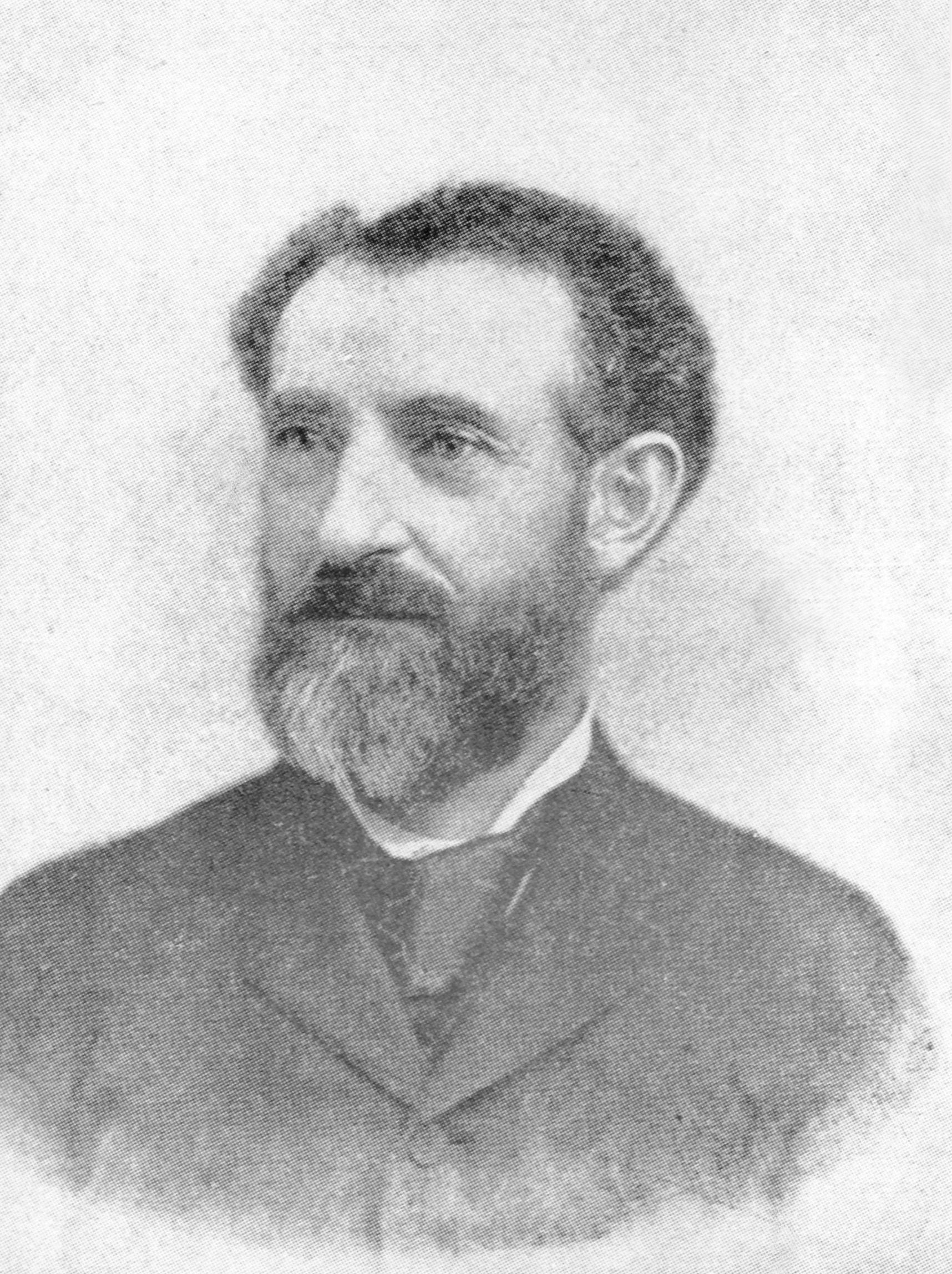
Robert Deniston Hume

Hapgood-Hume Company Eagle Cliff Cannery in eastern Wahkiakum County, Washington

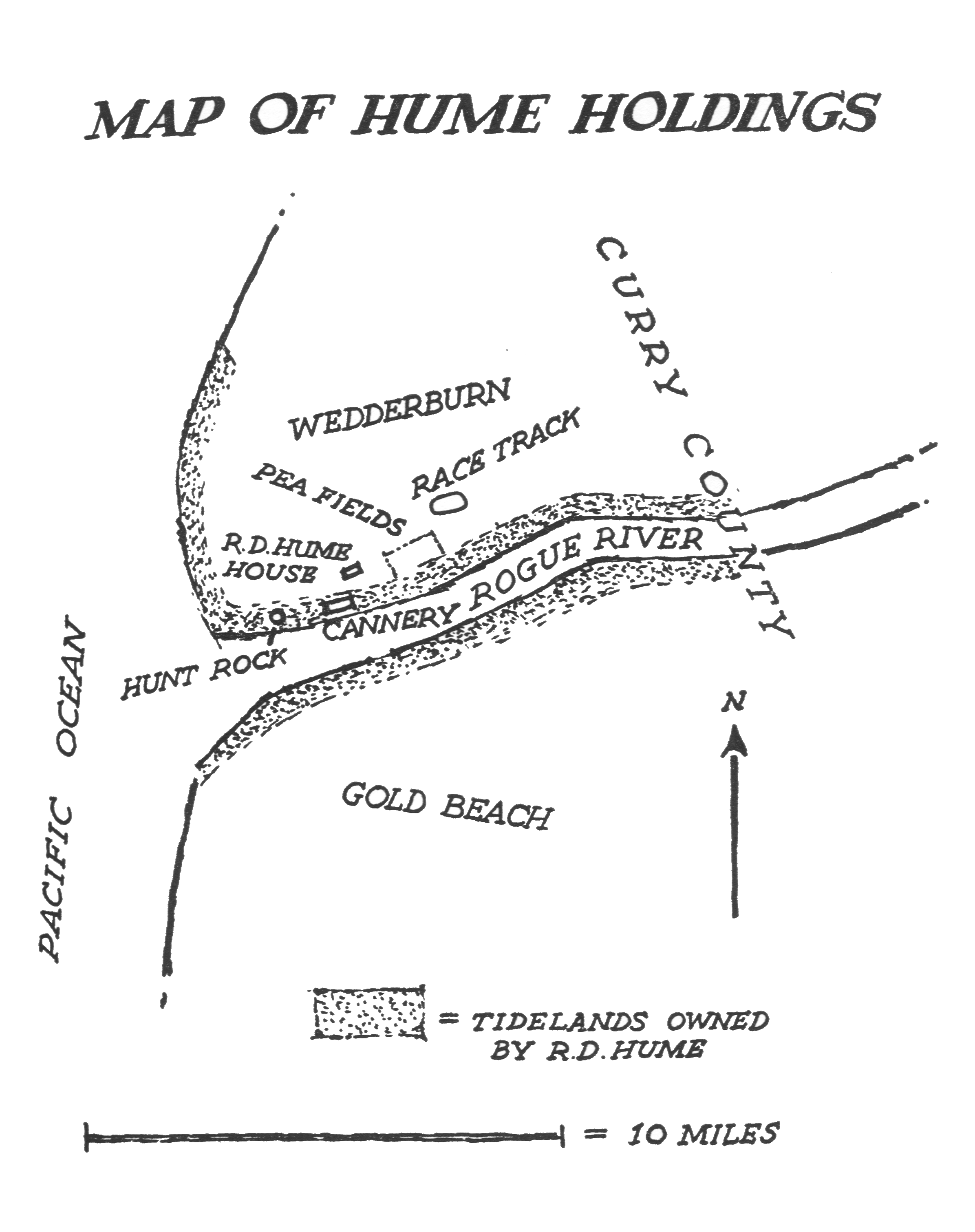
Hume Oregon operation from 1877 and 1908.

Salmon cannery in 1800s

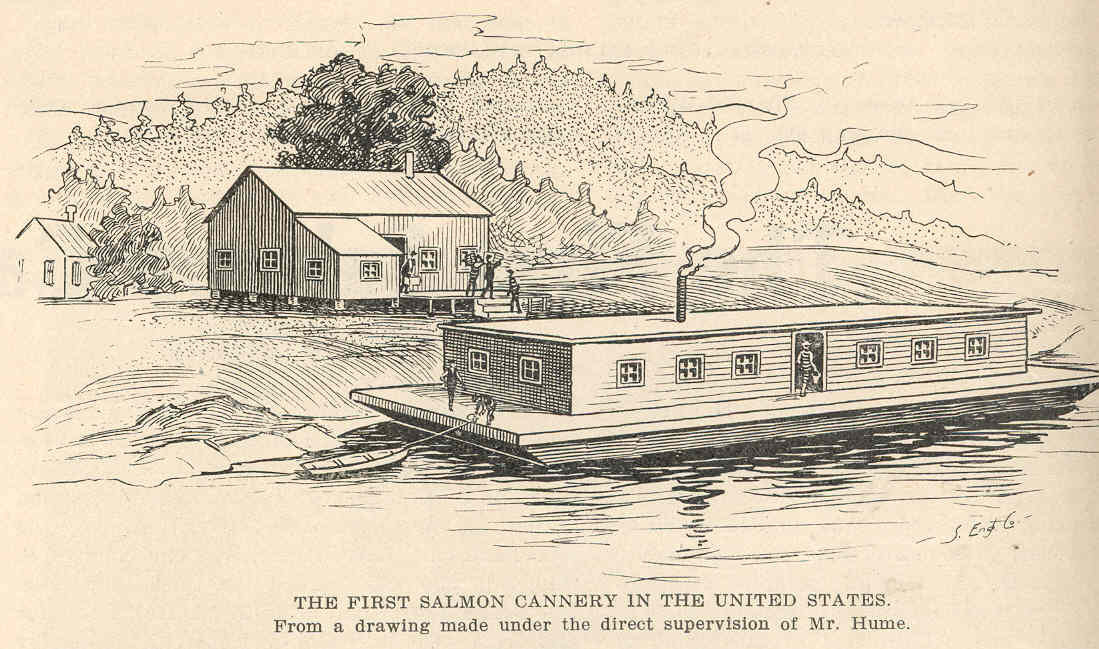
First salmon cannery, artist drawing made under the direct supervision of Mr. Hume

Hapgood-Hume Company, First Pacific Coast Salmon Cannery, National Register of Historic Places, #66000938, from April 6, 1964, to July 14, 2004, on the Sacramento River.

== See also ==
- California Historical Landmarks in Yolo County
- History of the Sacramento cannery industry
