= Salmon cannery =

Factory that commercially cans salmon

External videos
- Work in a cannery YouTube

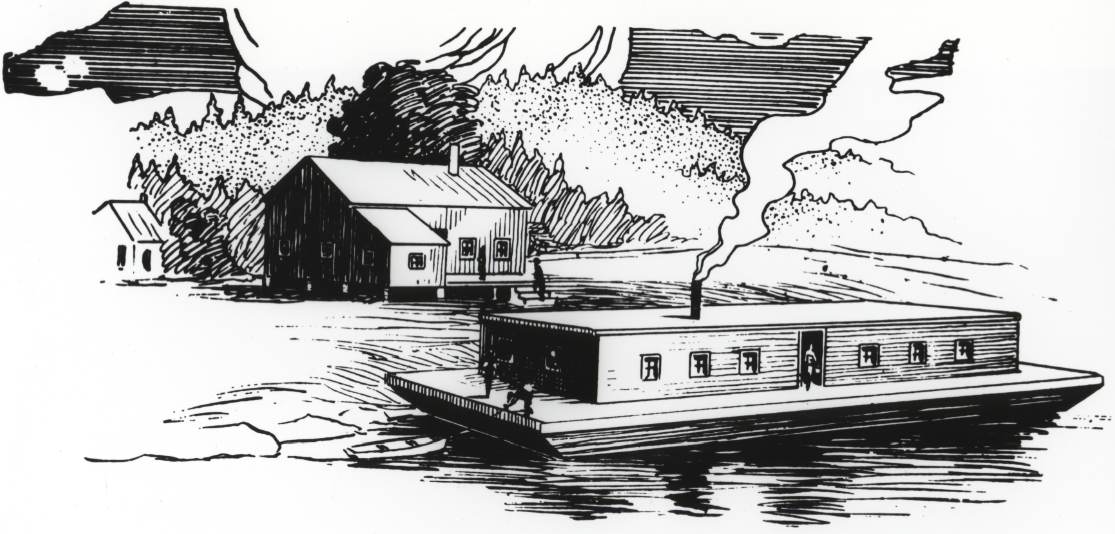
The first salmon cannery was established in North America in 1864 on a barge in the Sacramento River.

A salmon cannery is a factory that commercially cans salmon. It is a fish-processing industry that became established on the Pacific coast of North America during the 19th century, and subsequently expanded to other parts of the world that had easy access to salmon.

== Background ==
The "father of canning" is the Frenchman Nicolas Appert. In 1795, he began experimenting with ways to preserve food by placing it in sealed glass jars and then placing the jars in boiling water. During the first years of the Napoleonic Wars, the French government offered a 12,000-franc prize to anyone who could devise a cheap and effective method of preserving large amounts of food. The larger armies of the period required increased and regular supplies of quality food. Appert submitted his invention and won the prize in January 1810. The reason for lack of spoilage was unknown at the time, since Louis Pasteur did not demonstrate the role of microbes in food spoilage for another 50 years. However, glass containers presented challenges for transportation. Shortly after, the British inventor and merchant Peter Durand patented his own method, this time in a tin can, creating the modern-day process of canning foods.

Canning was used in the 1830s in Scotland to keep fish fresh until it could be marketed. By the 1840s, salmon was being canned in Maine and New Brunswick. The commercial salmon canneries had their main origins in California, and in the northwest of the US, particularly on the Columbia River. They were never important on the US Atlantic Coast, but by the 1940s, the principal canneries had shifted to Alaska.

The first salmon cannery in British Columbia began operating on the Fraser River in 1867. Although this first cannery was short lived, many others soon followed. Salmon canneries eventually spread throughout British Columbia, along the Fraser, Skeena, and Nass Rivers, as well as along much of the coast.

== North America ==
=== Native Americans ===
Long before the appearance of Europeans, Native Americans operated a dried salmon industry from the Columbia River, trading salmon to the Plains tribes. The Native Americans usually captured salmon by manually hauling seine nets (dragnets). The nets were woven with spruce root fibers or wild grass, and used sticks made of cedar as floats and stones as weights. The movement of the sticks during seining helped keep the fish together. The technique was to "sweep nets during ebb tide from upstream to down, with the net anchored at the beach upstream. A boat then carried the net out and around salmon migrating upstream."

Native Americans fishing

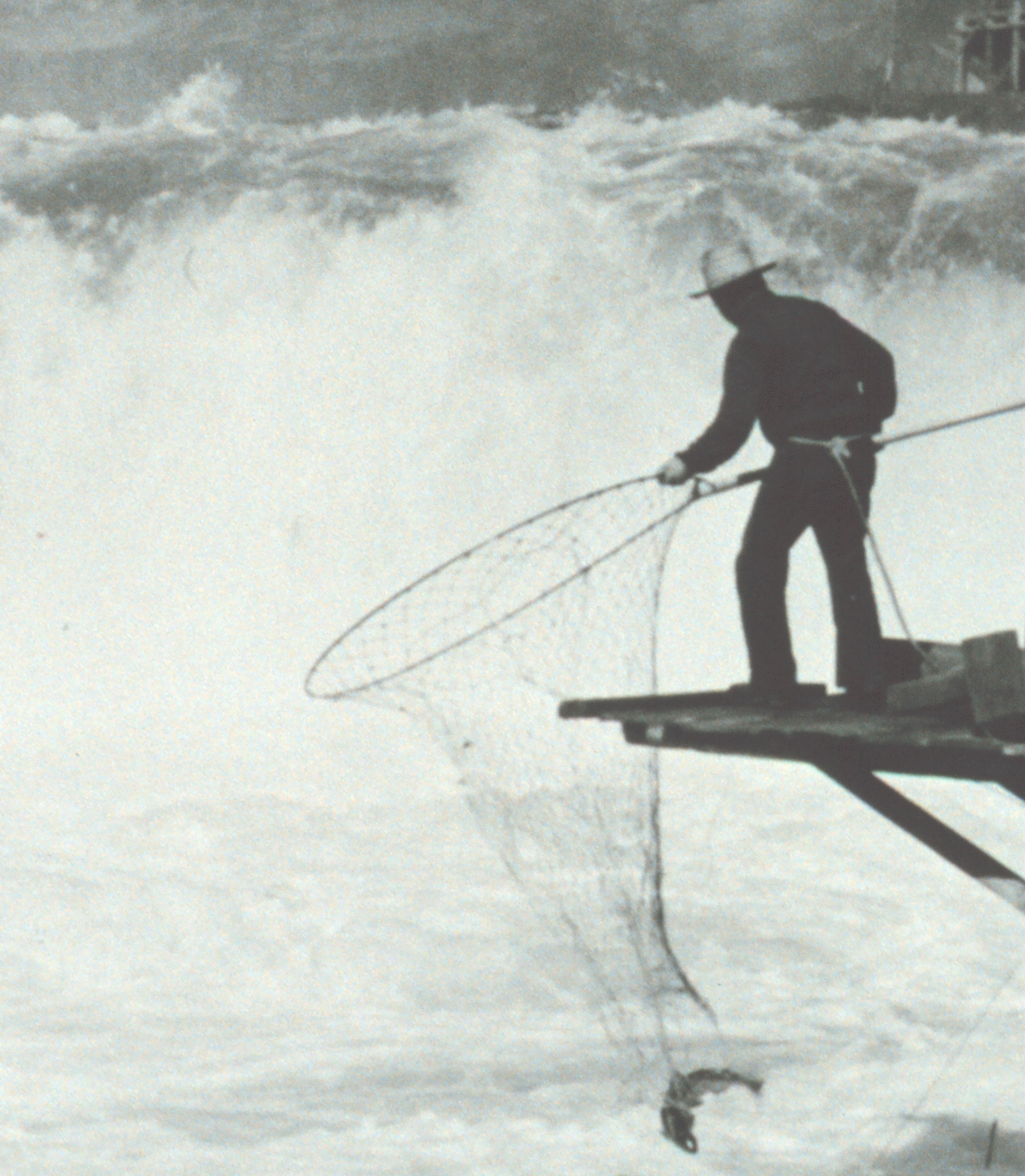
Native American fishing salmon with loop net, 1938

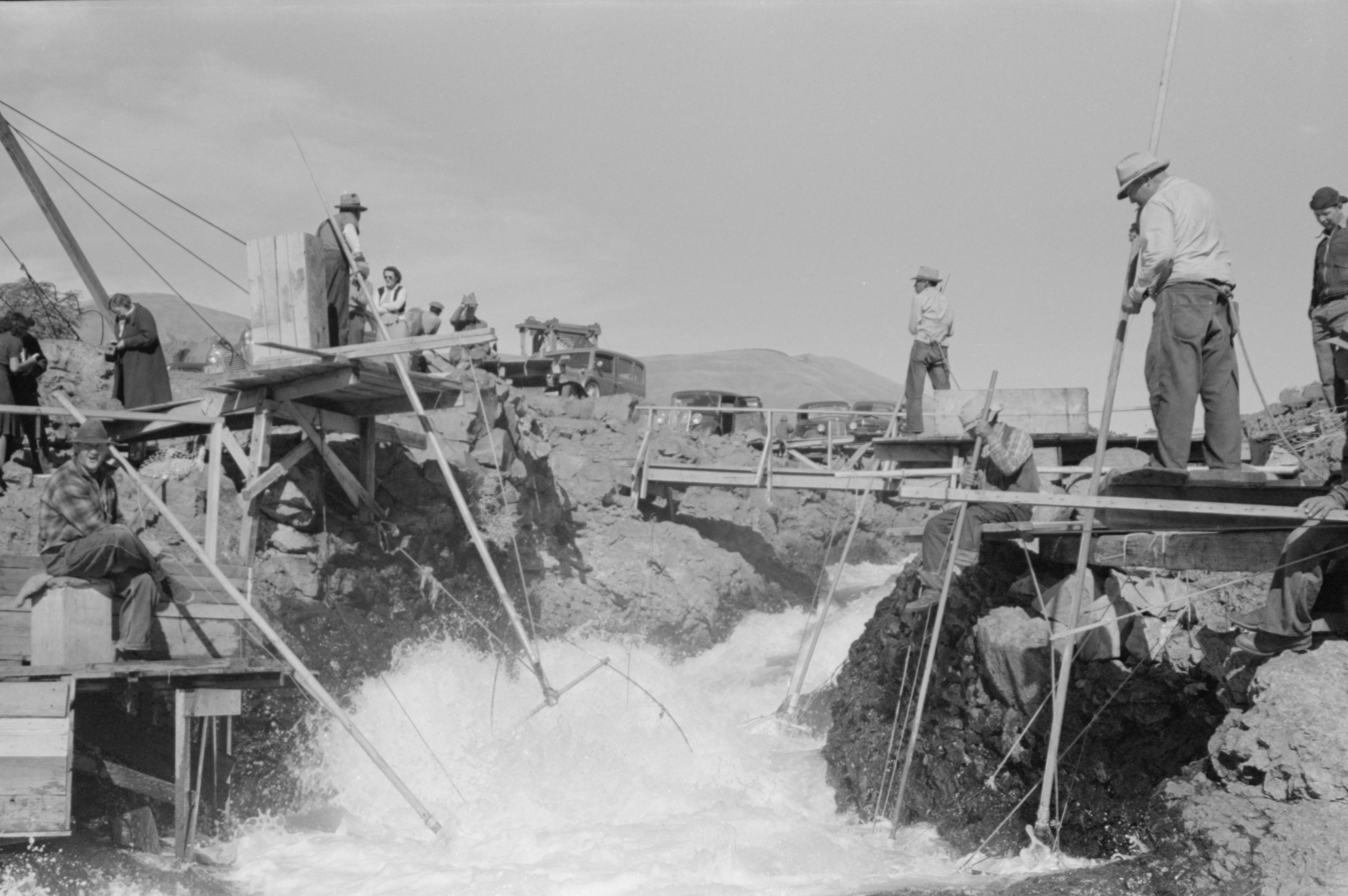
Dipnet fishing at Celilo Falls 1941

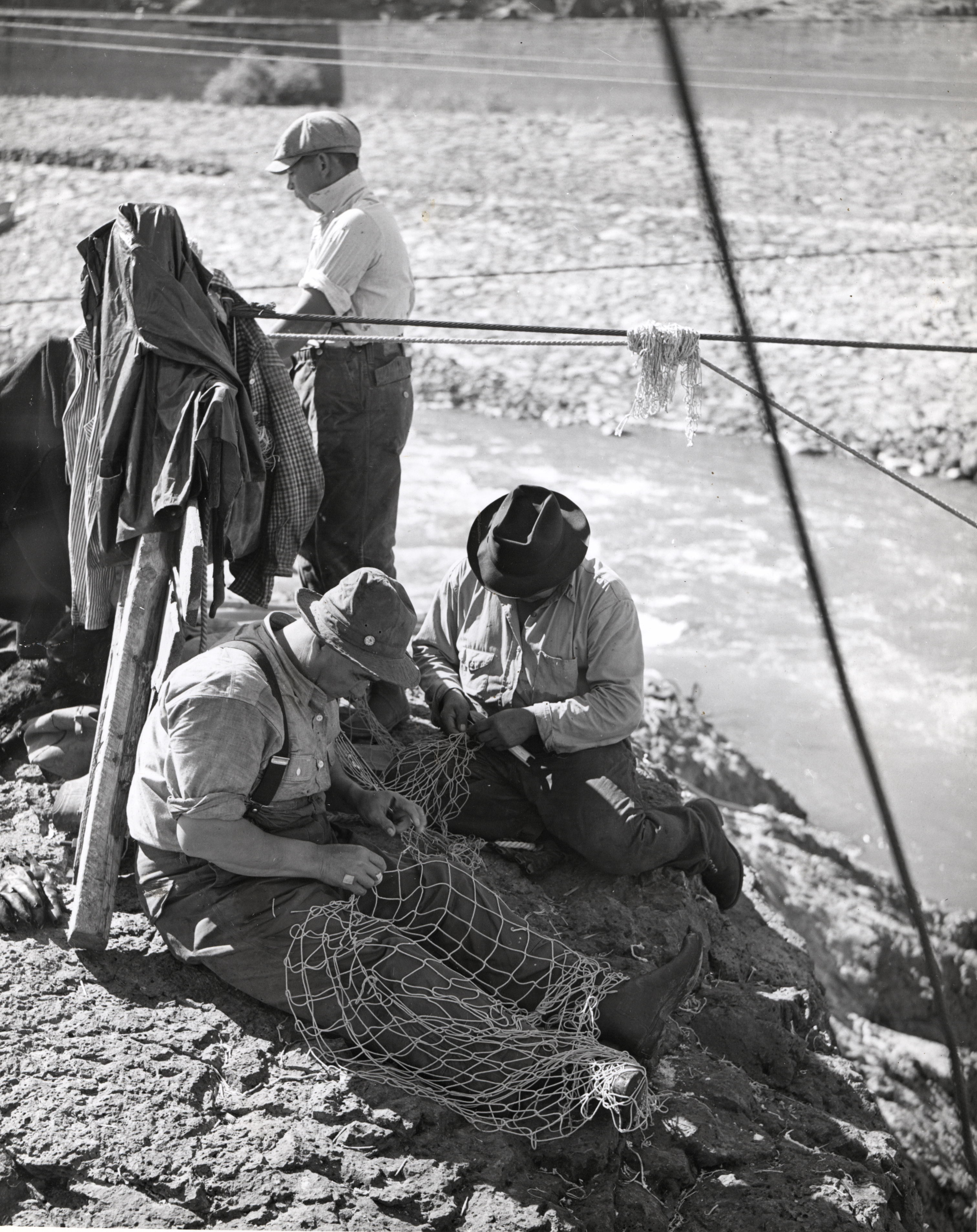
Repairing salmon nets, around 1950

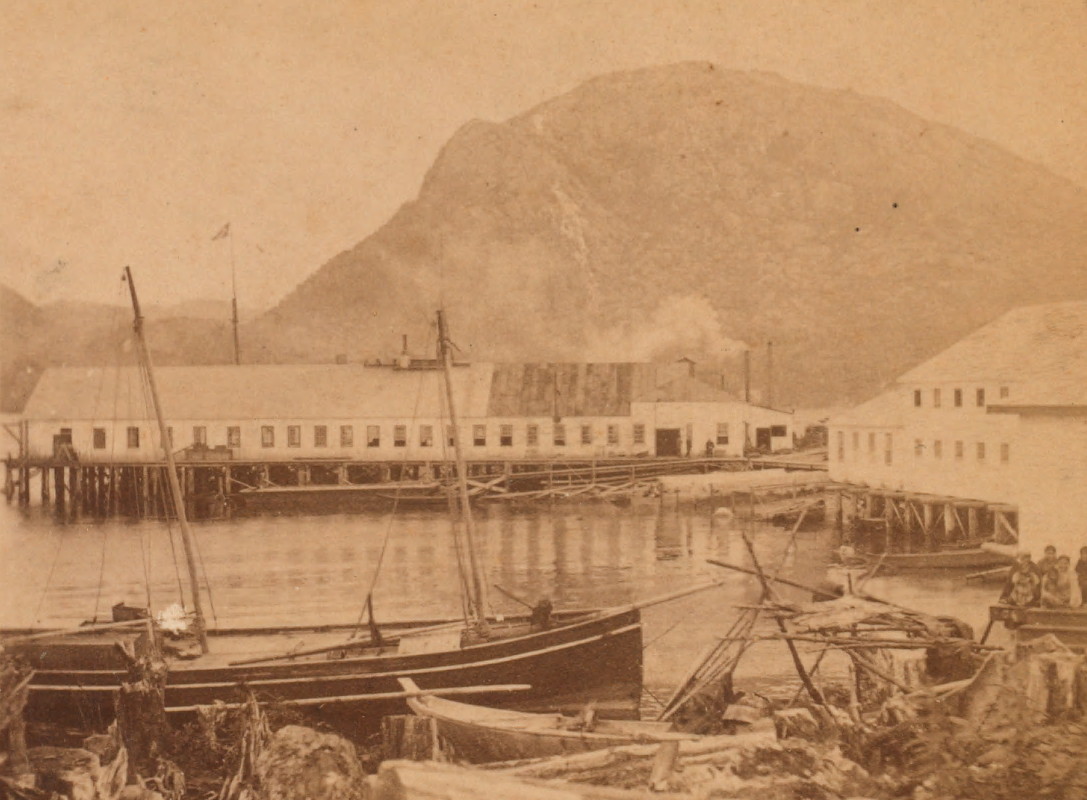
Indian Salmon Cannery, around 1890, New Metlakahtla, Alaska

=== Settlers ===
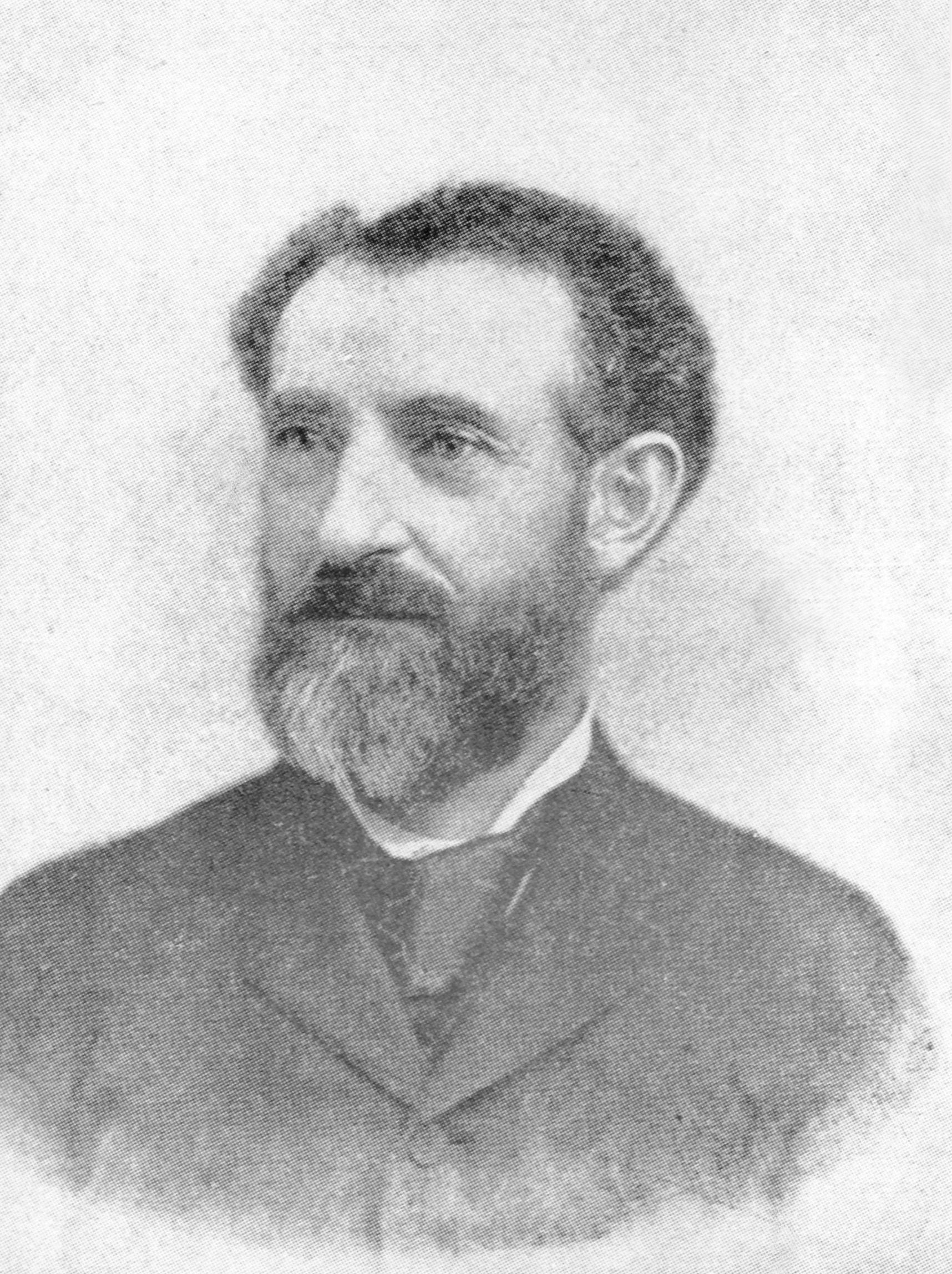
Robert Hume operated salmon canneries on the Columbia and Rogue rivers between 1866 and 1908.

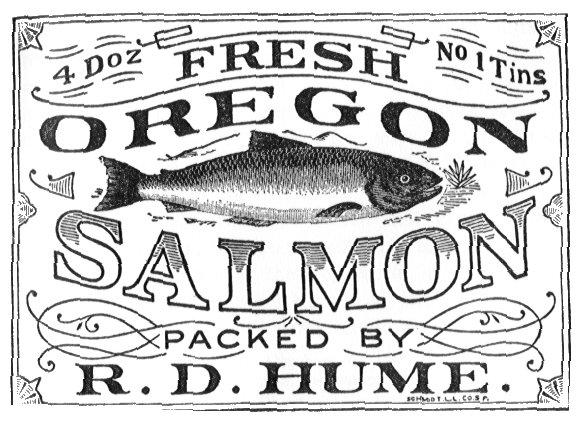
Salmon can label used by Hume

Prior to canning, fish were salted to preserve them. Cobb claims that at the start of the 19th century, the Russians marketed salted salmon caught in Alaska in St. Petersburg. Shortly after, the Northwest Fur Company started marketing salted salmon from the Columbia River. It then merged with the Hudson's Bay Company, and the salmon was marketed in Australia, China, Hawaii, Japan, and the eastern United States. Later, some salmon salteries were converted to salmon canneries.

The first industrial-scale salmon cannery in North America was established in 1864 on a barge in the Sacramento River by the four Hume brothers together with their partner Andrew S. Hapgood, the Hapgood-Hume Company. In 1866, the Hume brothers relocated the business to a site 50 miles inland on the Columbia River. The history of North American salmon canneries is exemplified by their history on the Columbia River. Within a few years, each of the Hume brothers had his own cannery. By 1872, Robert Hume was operating a number of canneries, bringing in Chinese people willing to work for low wages to do the cannery work, and having local Native American people do the fishing. By 1883, the salmon canneries had become the major industry on the Columbia River, with 1,700 gillnet boats supplying 39 canneries with 15,000 tonnes of salmon annually, mainly Chinook.

The settlers learned the use of seine nets from Native Americans. By 1895, 84 seines were on the Columbia, and Robert Hume started hauling them with teams of horses. The seines were operated from daybreak to dusk around islands and along beaches. At Puget Sound, salmon were caught by fishing boats using purse seines, which are used to encircle a school of salmon and then trap them by drawing ("pursing") the bottom of the net together, as one would with a string purse. By 1905, the boats used engines for hauling the seine lines. In 1922, use of salmon purse seiners on and around the Columbia was made illegal. In 1948, horse and manual seines were also outlawed.

By 1889, the Chinook salmon runs were declining, and the canneries started processing the less sought-after steelhead and sockeye salmon, followed by coho and chum salmon. The numbers of salmon continued to decline because the canneries intercepted them before they could spawn in the upper river. The decline was accelerated by mining and forestry operations, and the introduction of grazing animals, which resulted in the spawning grounds becoming silted and polluted. Further aggravation resulted from the diversion of water for irrigation. Columbia salmon harvest managers responded to these declines by introducing the hatchery production of fish fry. As a result, production leveled and remained fairly stable for some decades, before going into a further steady decline from 1930. The Columbia's last major cannery closed in 1980.

In 1928, in an attempt to measure the escapement of salmon in Southeast Alaska, the United States Bureau of Fisheries constructed four special weirs designed so the passing salmon could be counted (photo below). Escapement is the proportion of spawning stock that survives fishing pressure during a salmon run. The counting stations were intended to provide harvest managers with data they needed to manage the salmon fisheries, but they missed much of the escapement. Smaller fish passed through the weirs uncounted, the salmon could not be counted during times of flood, and hundreds of other salmon streams in the area were without counting stations.

European settlers fishing

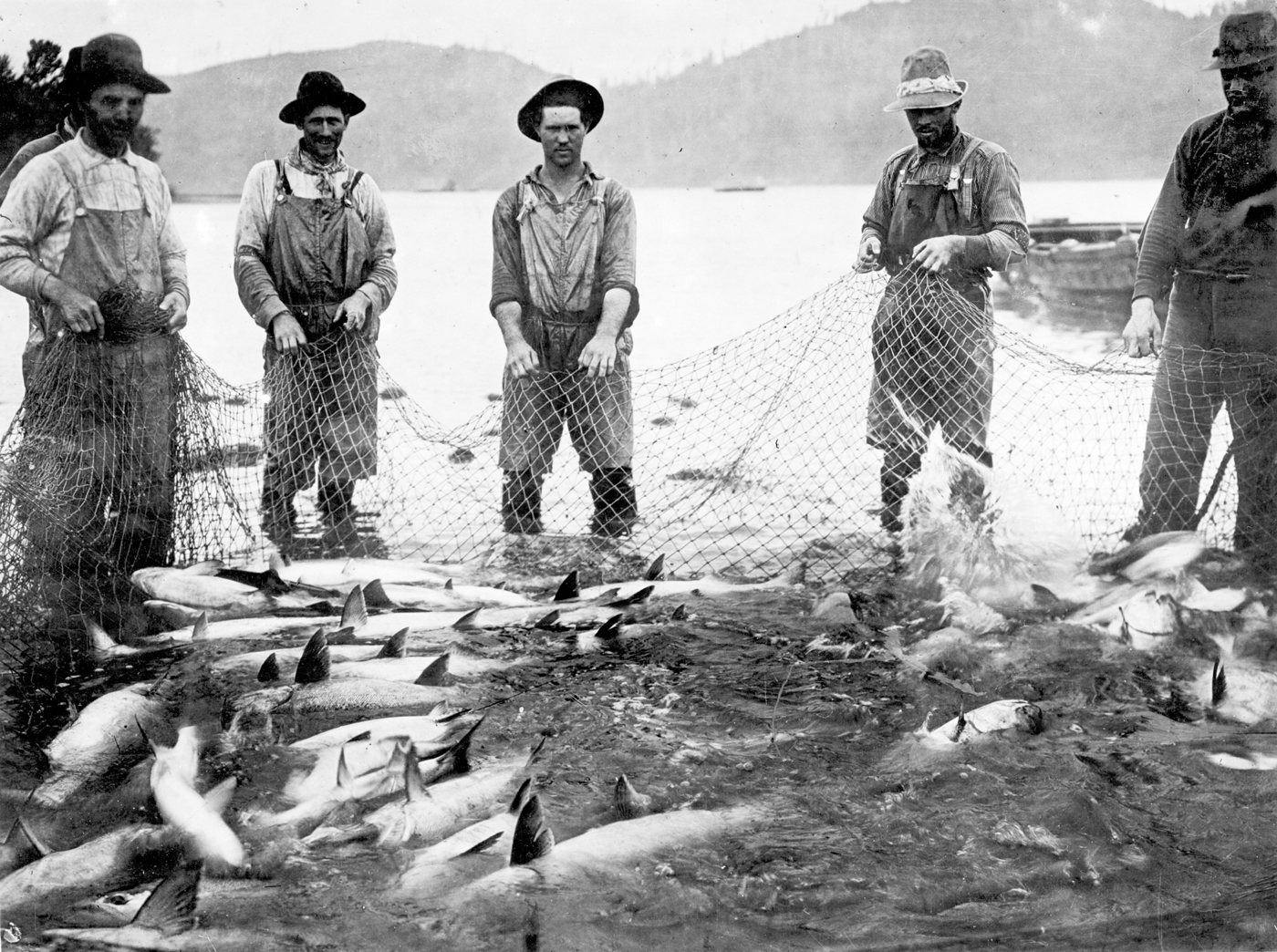
Manually seining salmon on Columbia River 1914

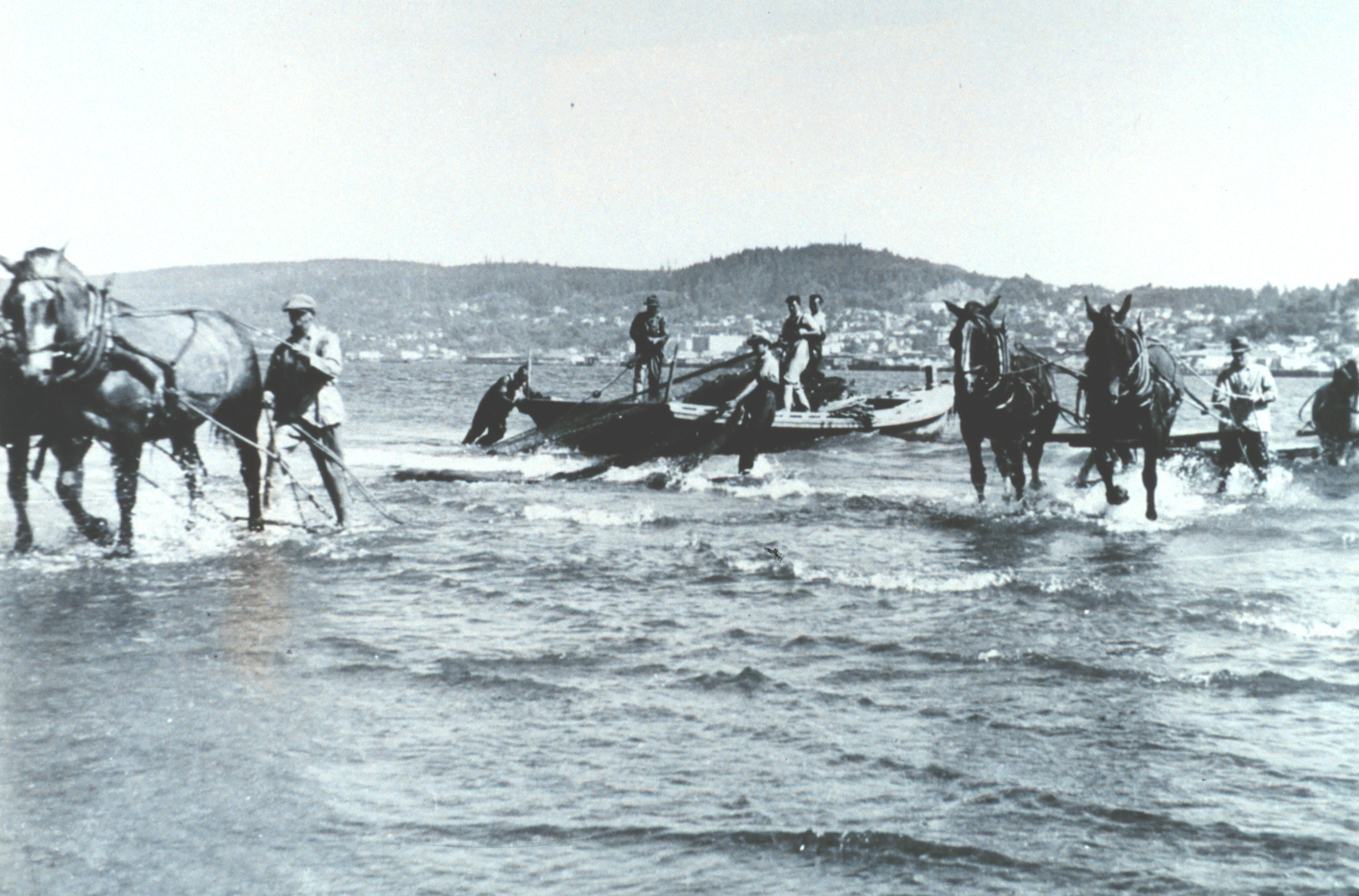
Hauling a seine on the Columbia River using horse teams 1938

Early steam seine netter

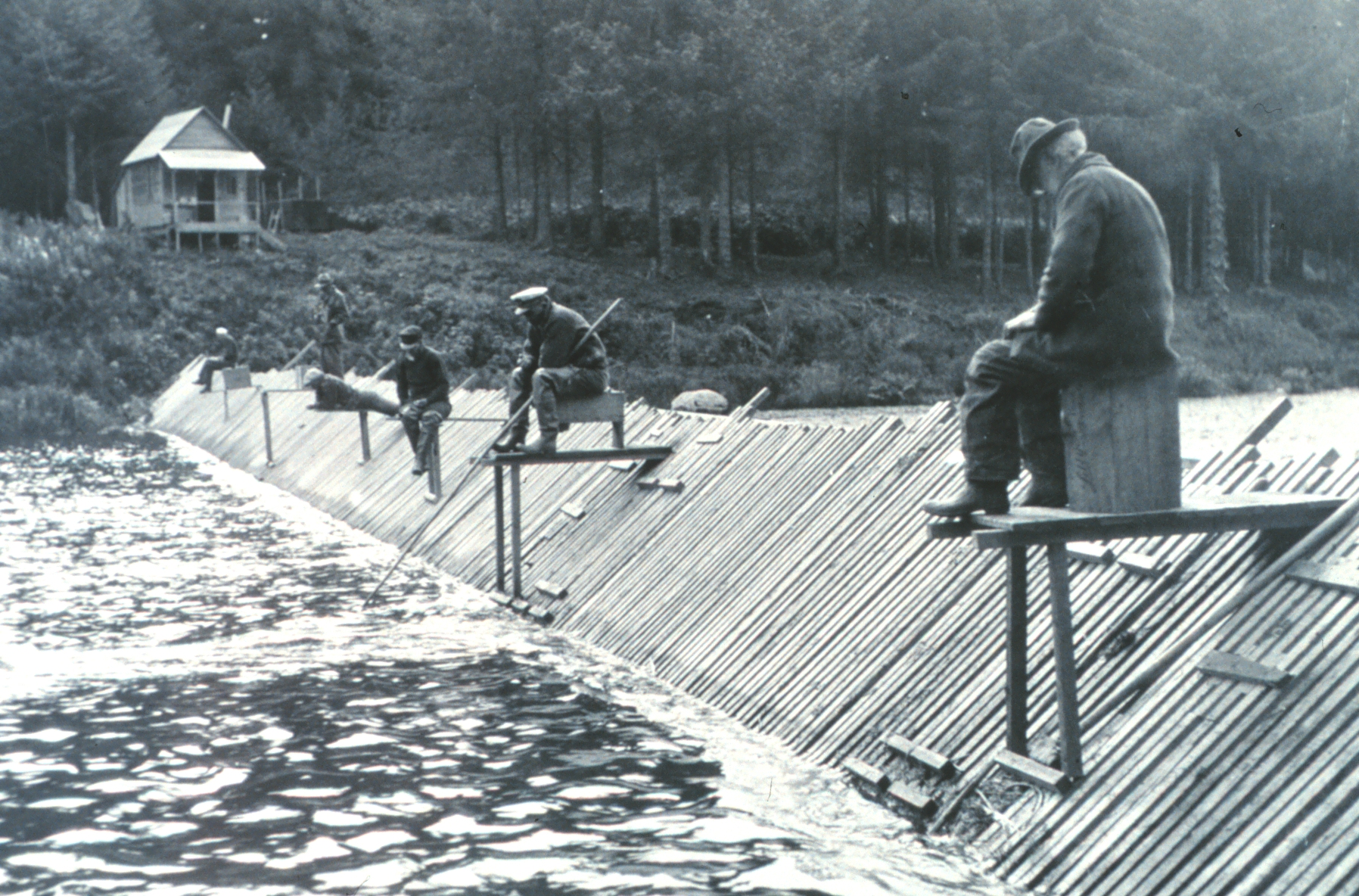
A salmon counting station, where attempts were made to manually count the salmon migrating upstream

== Cannery workers ==
People of many nationalities worked in the canneries along the Pacific coast, thus creating an ideal atmosphere for the development of interracial relationships. First Nations people made up the majority of the workforce, though Chinese, Japanese, and Caucasian workers were also present. While at work in the canneries, each of these groups was housed in separate accommodations. The single men generally stayed in racially segregated bunkhouses, while First Nations families lived in small huts or in camps near the canneries. The jobs that these groups performed at the cannery, as well as the wages that they earned, were generally decided by their race.

=== First Nations ===
While many of the foreign workers employed at canneries were single or married men trying to provide for their families back home, not uncommonly, entire First Nations families were present at the canneries. Men, women, and children lived and worked alongside each other during the fishing season, before returning to their homes for the remainder of the year. First Nations men were valued as excellent fishers, as fishing had been a part of their economy since long before settlers reached the coast. While First Nations workers were valuable assets to the canneries, they were not always reliable in the sense that they did not always return year after year. Most First Nations families had other means to provide for themselves, so they were not dependent on the income that the canneries provided, at least in the beginning. In some cases, though, individuals or families returned to the same cannery year after year.

=== Chinese ===
Chinese workers originally performed many jobs inside the canneries. They made tins, butchered fish, and packed them. The Chinese were seen as well suited to these more feminine tasks because many people viewed them as a feminine race. These workers were a source of cheap labor prior to the introduction of the head tax in 1903. Afterwards, many workers were replaced or reallocated with the invention of the iron chink, a butchering machine said to replace up to 30 Chinese workers. The name of this machine demonstrates the inherent racisms present at the time of its creation, and it has since been renamed as the iron butcher. While European workers were generally hired on an individual basis, Chinese men commonly were hired through contractors. These contractors, often called the China-boss, would agree on a set price with the cannery operators, and would then hire workers with that figure in mind. Individual Chinese laborers were then paid by the contractor who hired them, though the contractor generally kept a large portion of the money.

=== Japanese ===
Japanese workers were prized for their ability to repair boats, as well as their skills as fishermen. These skills placed them in direct competition with European and First Nations fishers. Due to the nature of the jobs they performed, Japanese men were not seen as feminine, as the Chinese tended to be viewed. Although they were still segregated from other workers, they were paid more, and they were higher on the social scale. The Japanese played an important role in canneries until World War II, when many Japanese men were interned for the duration of the war. At this time, many of their fishing vessels were also confiscated, making returning after the war difficult for them. Despite this treatment, many Japanese men did return to cannery life in the aftermath of the war, though the return was slow, and was not welcomed by all.

=== Women ===
As mentioned above, many First Nations women came to the canneries with their husbands, fathers, or other male relatives. They were not idle during the canning season, but performed a number of important tasks within the cannery, similar to the tasks performed by the Chinese. Women cleaned fish, packed them into tins, mended nets, and acted as nursemaids to the many children on site. They tended not to act as fishers, though some Native women may have accompanied their fathers on their boats, especially at a young age. Although women were paid for the work that they performed, their wages were among the lowest in the cannery. Within the canneries, as many as 50% of the workers could be women, which suggests that the female labor force was necessary to the operation of many canneries.

Although women of other nationalities were sometimes present at canneries, Native women were the most prolific. Japanese women reportedly worked on the canning with their babies strapped to their backs, and records suggest that white women sometimes worked as cooks or assistant shopkeepers. Aside from actively participating in the canning process, women helped to make the canneries into more than just work sites. With the presence of women and children, canneries became homes away from home for all of the workers on site.

== Timeline ==
- 1795–1810: Nicolas Appert worked out how to preserve food in sealed jars and won a 12,000-franc prize.
- 1810: Peter Durand patented his more robust method of using tin cans, instead of breakable jars.
- 1824: The first recorded time salmon was canned, in Aberdeen, Scotland.
- 1839: Salmon first canned at Saint John, New Brunswick.
- 1864: First commercial salmon cannery was established on a barge in the Sacramento River.
- 1866: The cannery was relocated to the Columbia River, where it triggered an important industry.
- 1867: James Symes preserved Fraser River salmon experimentally in hermetically sealed cans in his home kitchen.
- 1870: The first commercial canning operation in British Columbia opened on the Fraser River.
- 1878: The industry spread to Alaska, with a cannery on the Prince of Wales Island.
- 1890: Commercial-scale operations started in northern Japan.
- 1906: Siberia established its salmon-canning industry.
- 1936: International production peaked at about 300,000 tonnes for the year.
- 1980: The Columbia River's last major cannery closed.

== Historical images ==
Fishing for the cannery

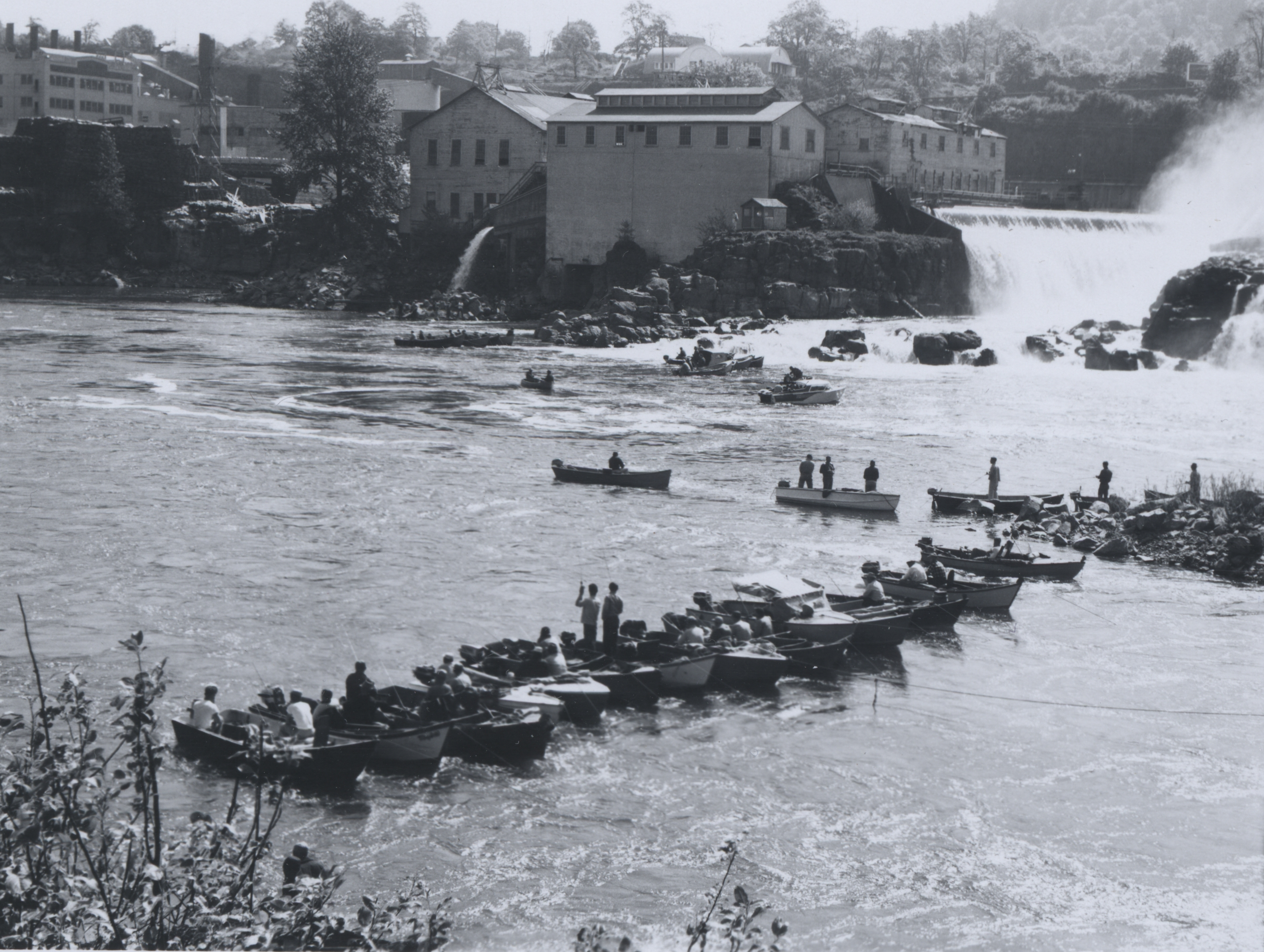
Fishermen intercepting a salmon run 1958

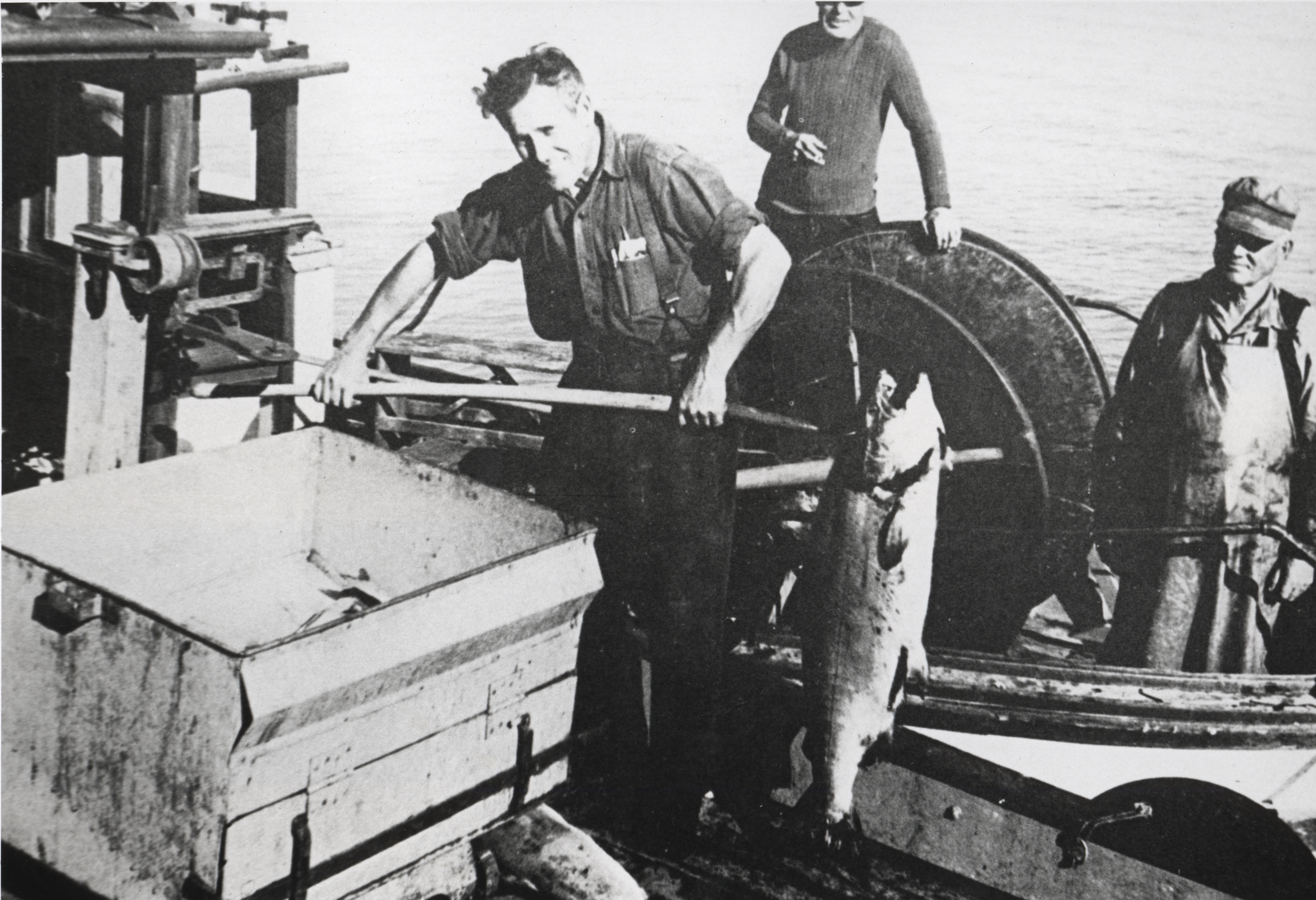
To save time-wasting trips back to the cannery, packer boats are sent out to the fleets to pick up the catch.

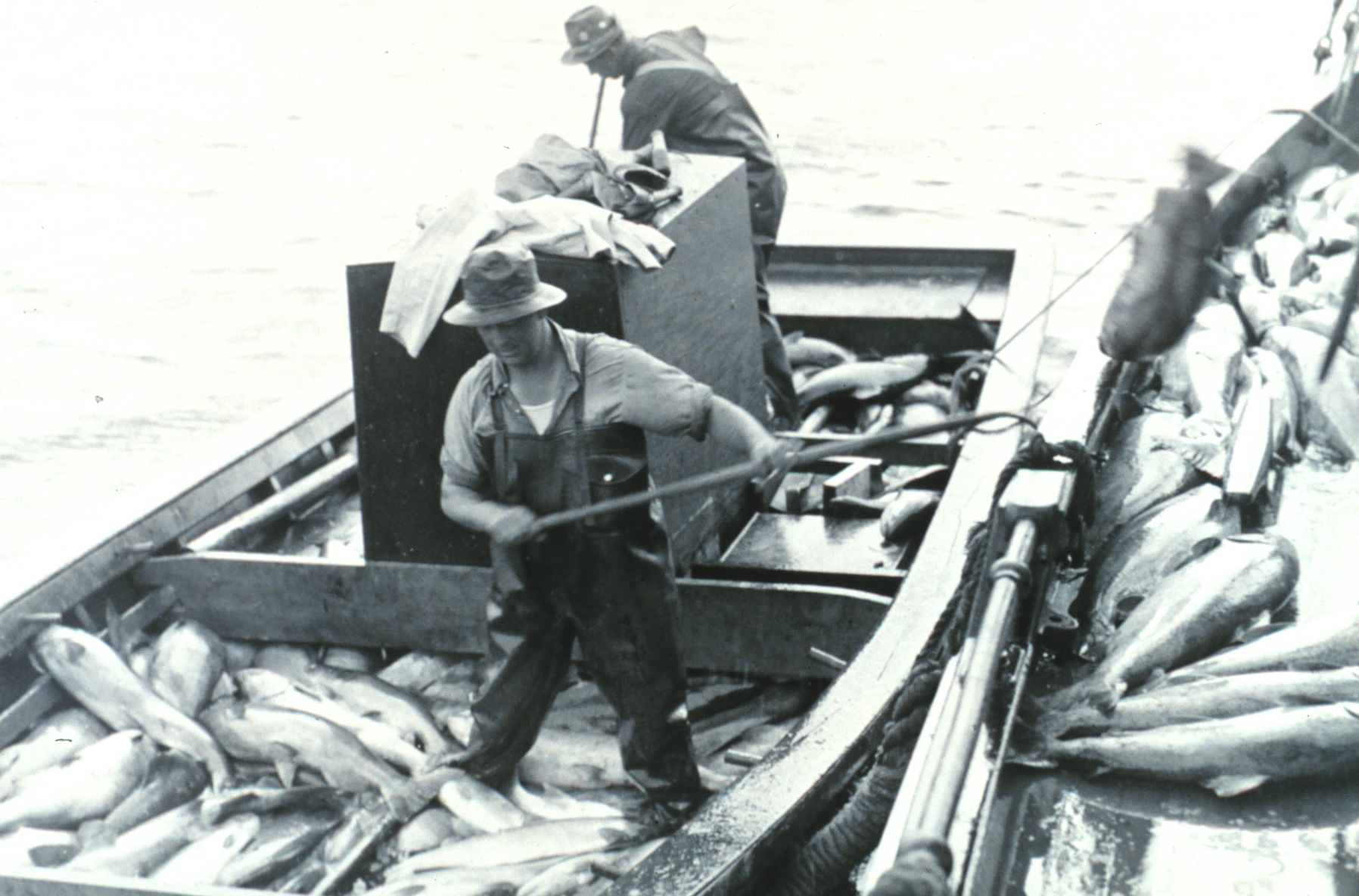
Salmon being transferred to a large boat on which they are iced and hauled to a cannery, around 1938

Cannery processing

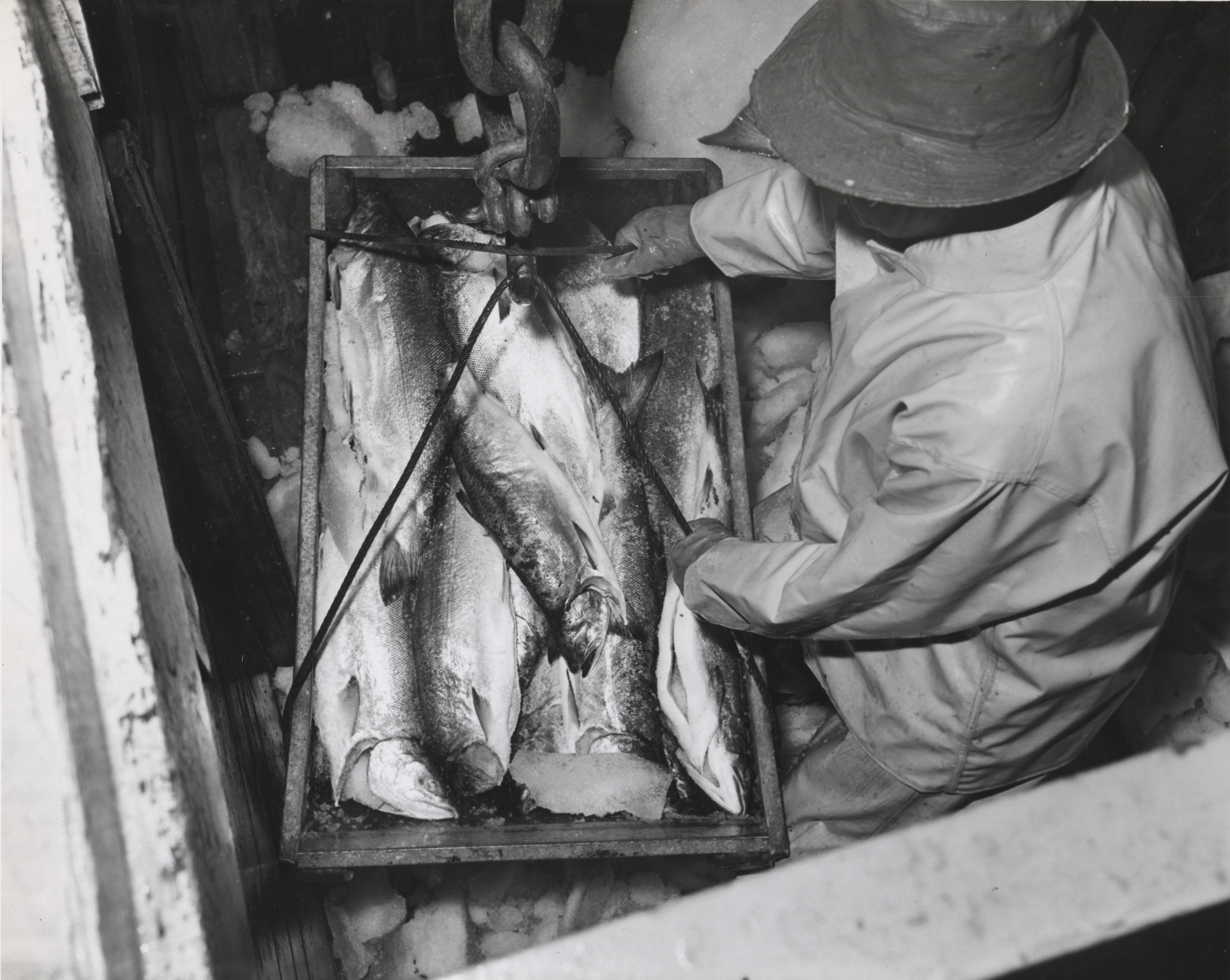
Lifting salmon from the hold of a boat

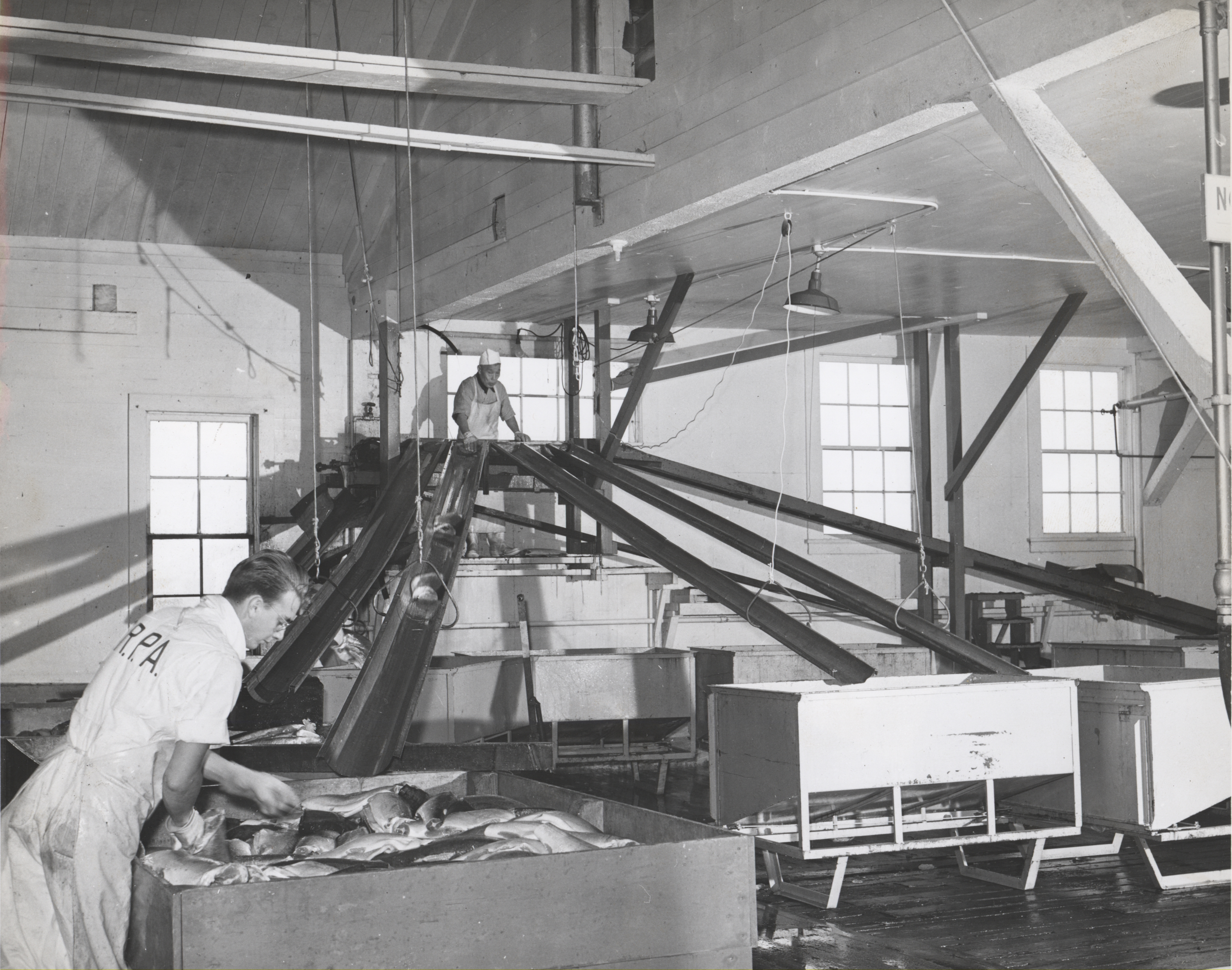
Grading the salmon: The grader is at the top of the shutes.

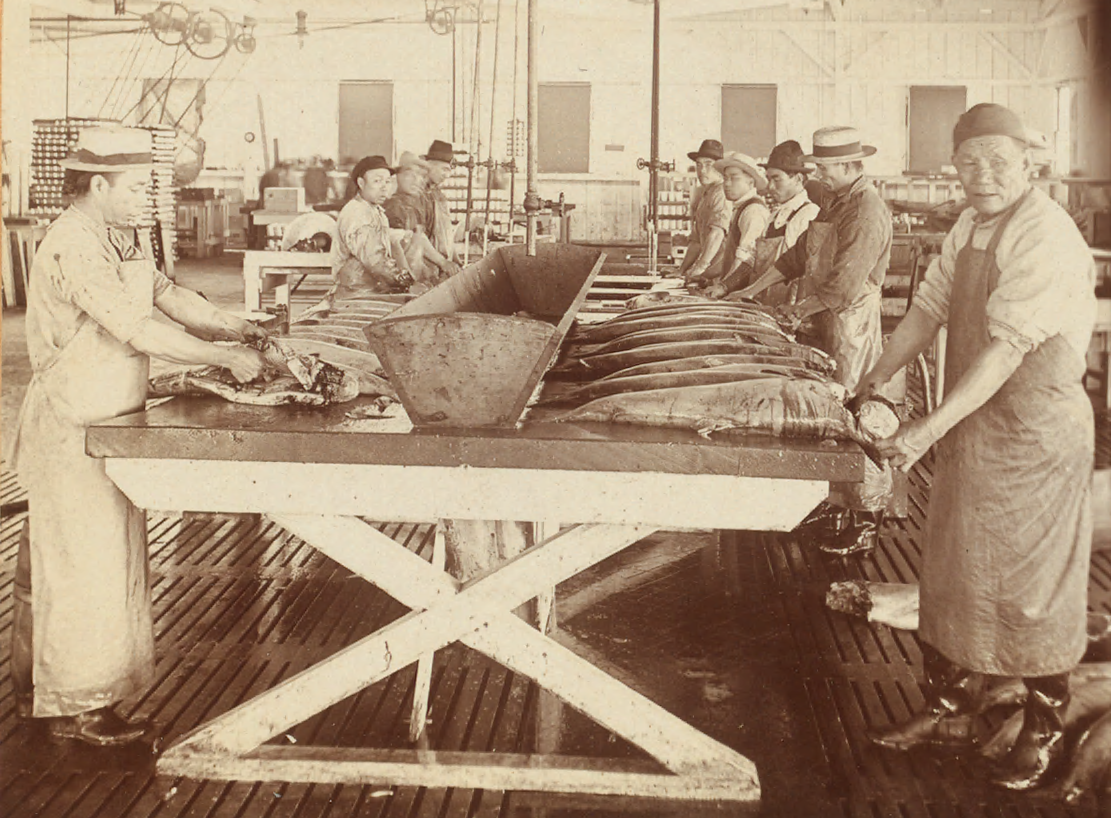
Filleting salmon in Oregon: In the early years, Chinese and Japanese were the preferred cannery workers.

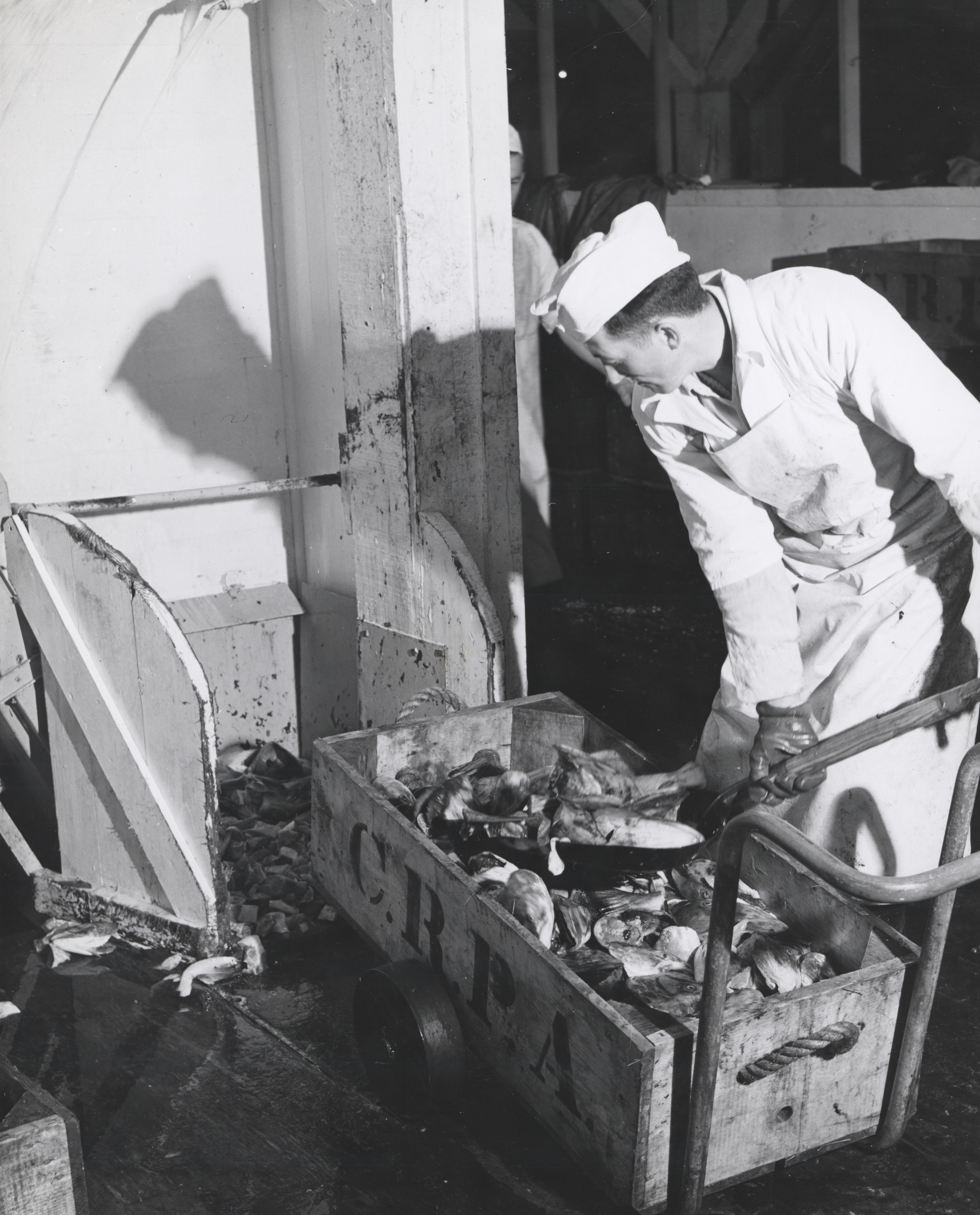
Fish heads and tails are boiled to extract oil for packing the salmon.

Cannery buildings

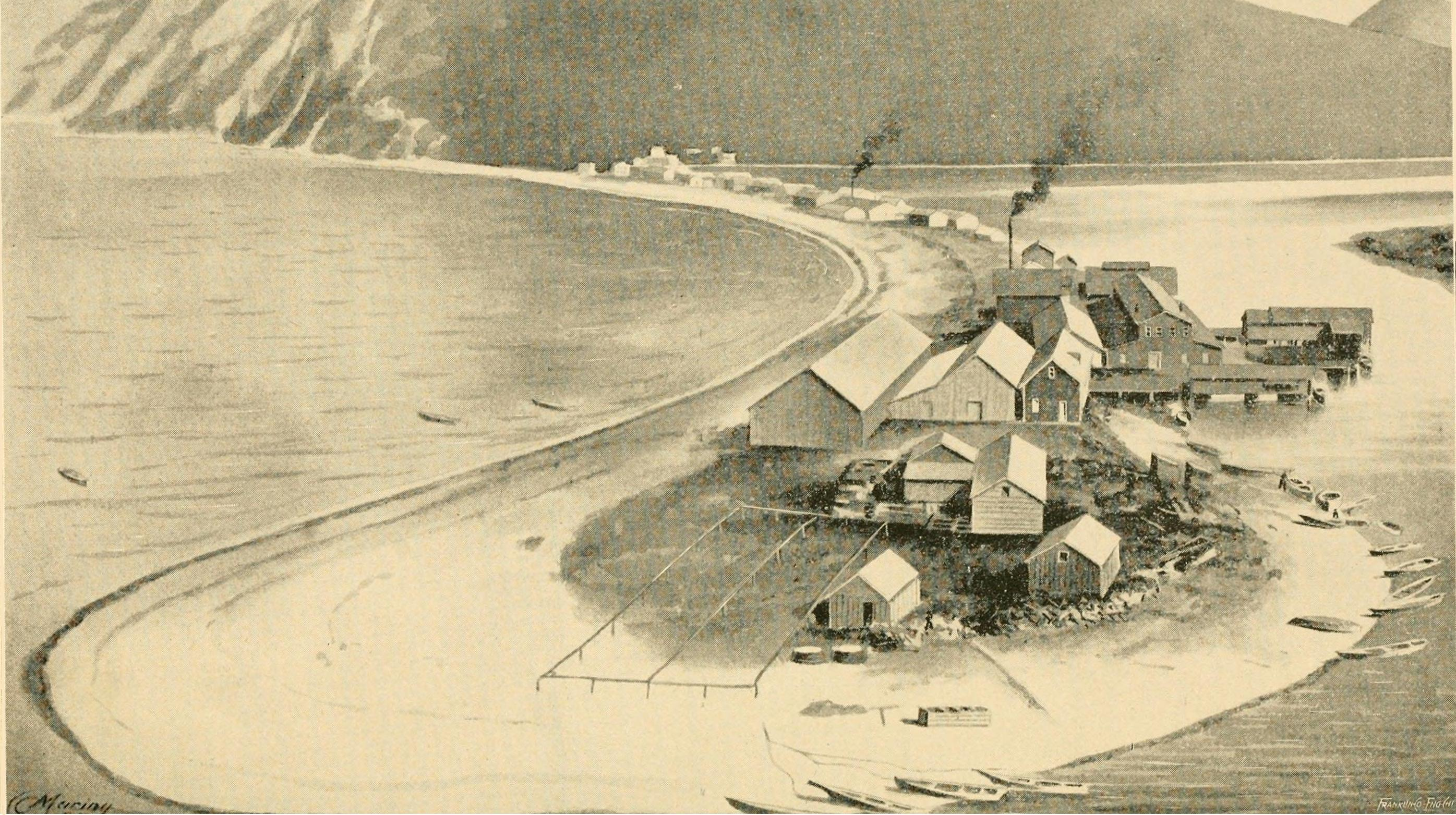
Karluk sandspit in the late 1800s showing cannery and village: The Karluk River was sometimes called the "River of Life" due to the dense salmon run.

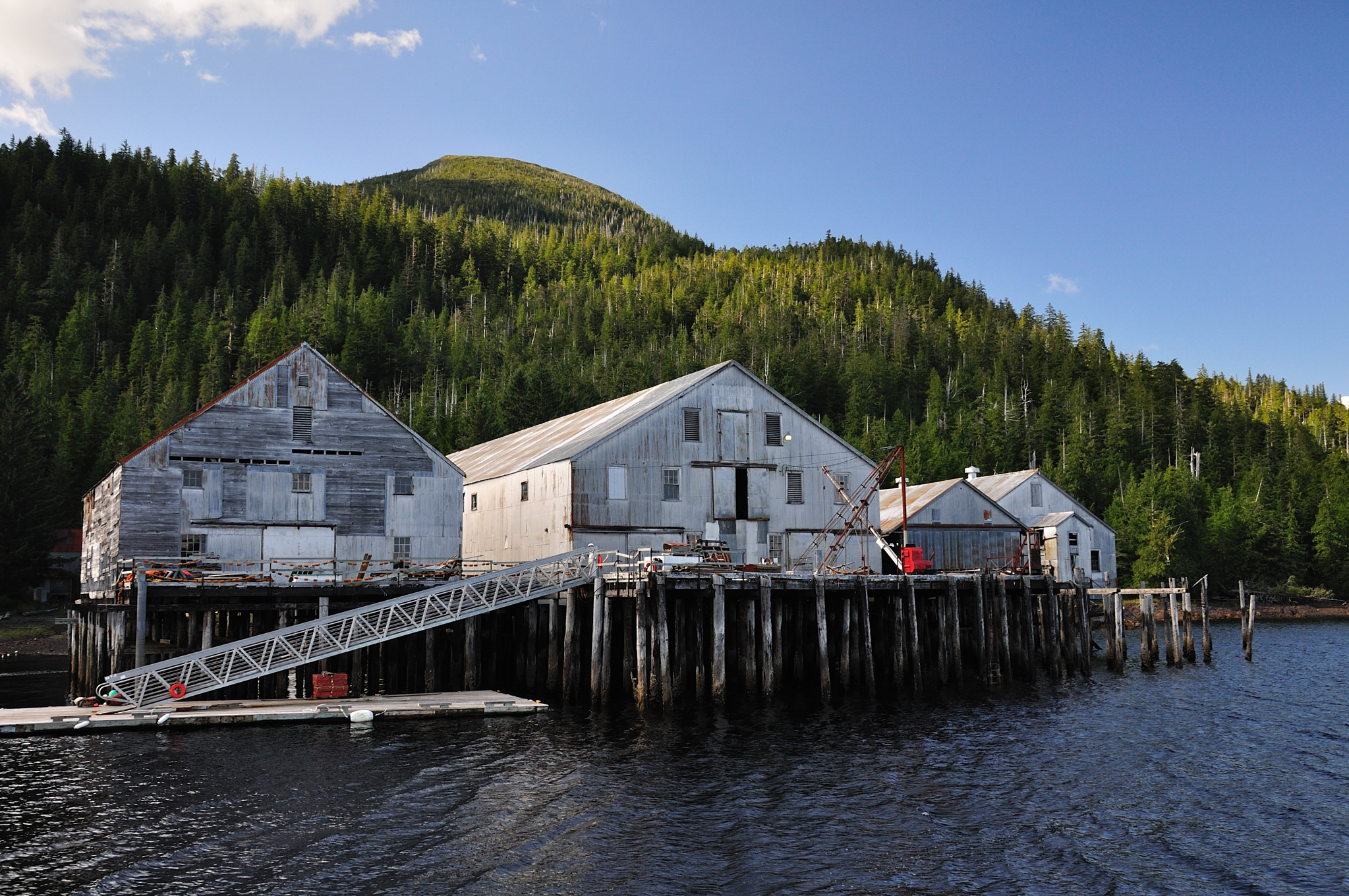
Salmon Cannery on Georgia Inlet, Ketchikan, Alaska

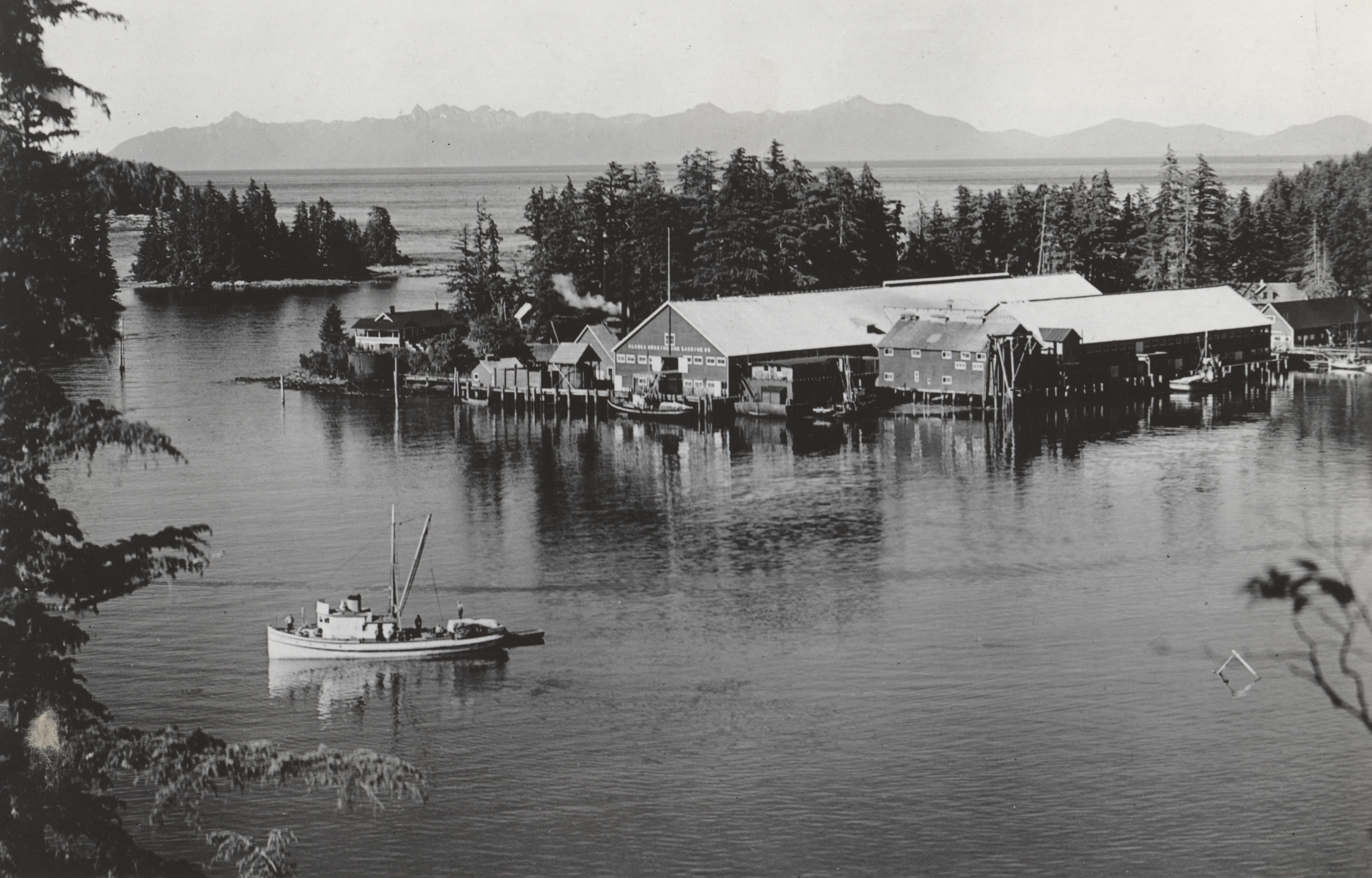
Salmon cannery and herring reduction plant

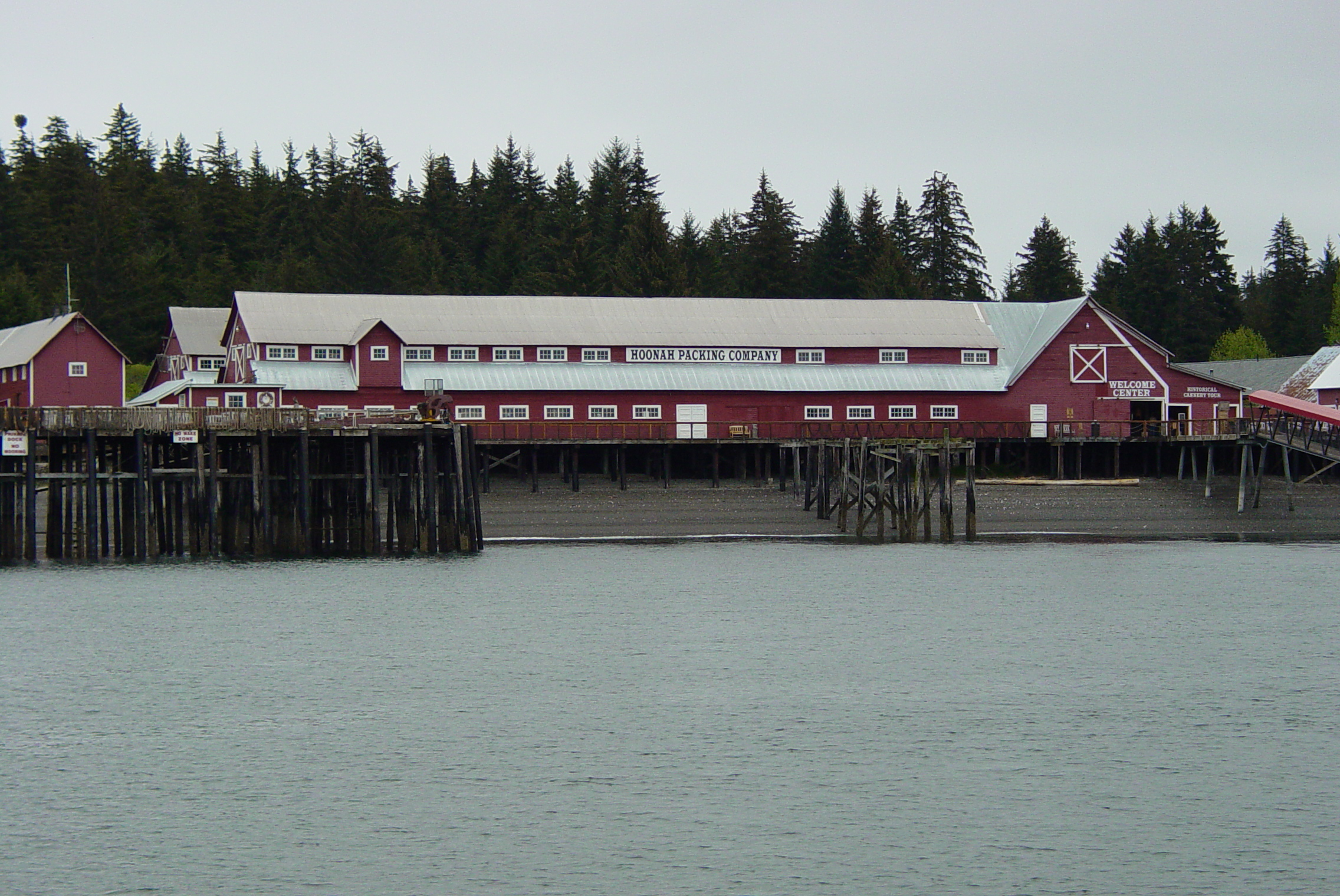
Hoonah Packing Company, Salmon Cannery, now a museum

== See also ==
- Alaska Packers' Association
- Alaska salmon fishery
- Alaskeros, salmon workers in Alaska
- Canned fish
- Canned sardines
- Cannery Row
- Columbia River Indigenous peoples
- History of fishing
- History of Sacramento Cannery Industry
- List of canneries
- List of canneries in British Columbia
- List of salmon canneries and communities
- List of seafood companies
- Rogue River Commercial fishing
- USS LCI(L)-1091
- North of the Great Divide (1950 film)
