= Robert Deniston Hume =

American cannery owner, hatchery owner, and politician (1845–1908)

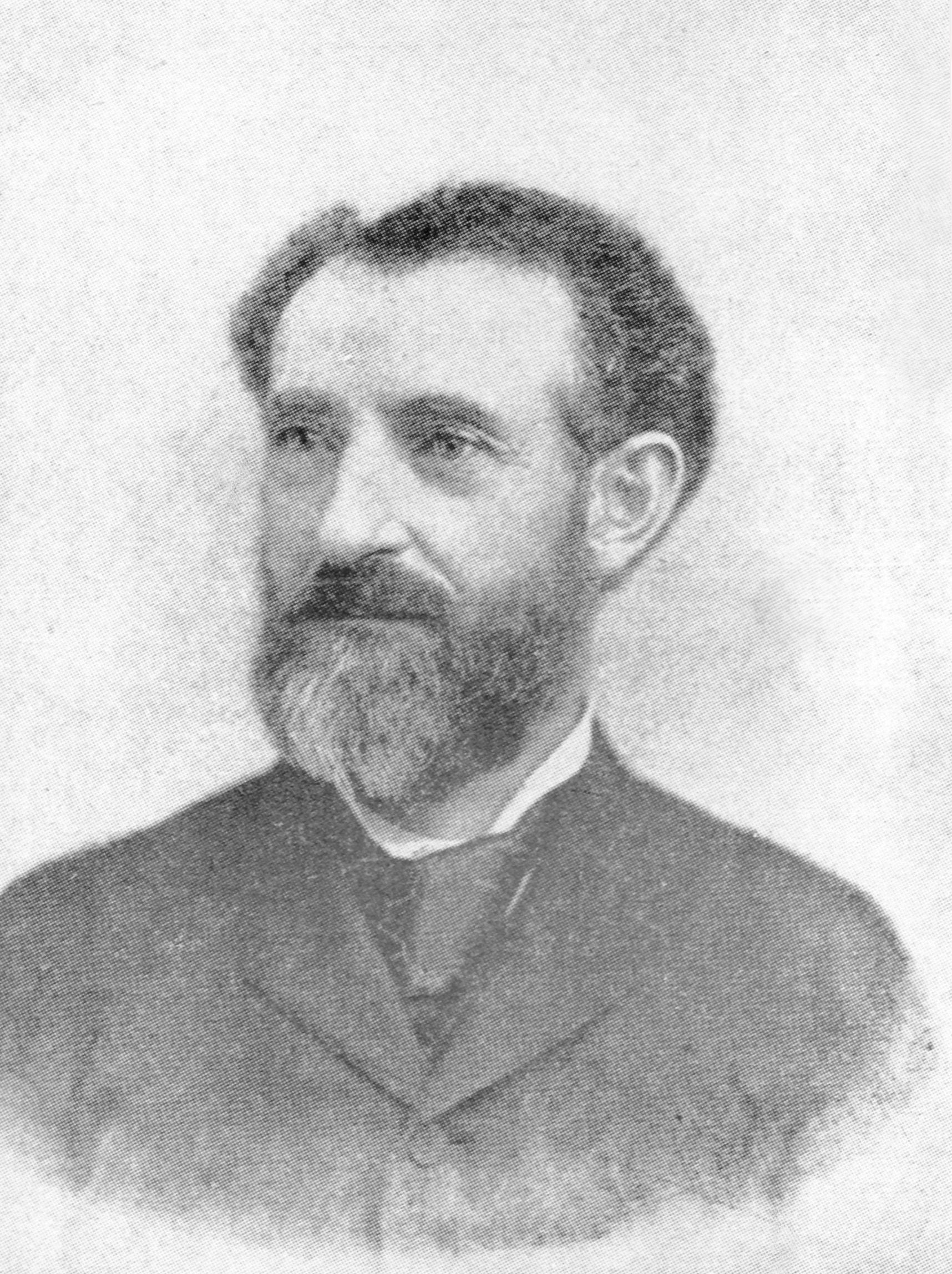
- R.D. Hume in the 1890s
- Born: October 31, 1845; Augusta, Maine, US
- Died: November 25, 1908, age 63; Wedderburn, Oregon, US
- Resting place: Hunt Rock in Wedderburn in 1908; body moved to San Francisco in 1912
- Occupations: Cannery owner, "pygmy monopolist", hatchery owner, politician
- Known for: Salmon canning and hatcheries, especially on the Rogue River
- Political party: Republican
- Spouse(s): Celia Bryant; Mary A. Duncan

Robert Deniston Hume (October 31, 1845 – November 25, 1908) was a cannery owner, pioneer hatchery operator, politician, author, and self-described "pygmy monopolist" who controlled salmon fishing for 32 years on the lower Rogue River in U.S. state of Oregon. Born in Augusta, Maine, and reared by foster parents on a farm, Hume moved at age 18 to San Francisco to join a salmon-canning business started by two of his brothers. They later re-located to Astoria on the Columbia River, where they prospered. After the death of his first wife and their two young children, Hume moved again and started anew in Gold Beach, at the mouth of the Rogue.

In 1877 Hume bought rights to a Rogue River fishery, then built a salmon cannery and many other structures and acquired all of the tidelands bordering the lower 12 miles (19 km) of the river. He remarried, invested in a small fleet of ships and a salmon hatchery and expanded his business interests to include a store, hotel, newspaper, and many other enterprises in Gold Beach and in the nearby community of Wedderburn, which he founded. Canning, shipping, and selling hundreds of tons of salmon over the years, he became known as the Salmon King of Oregon.

Hume often wrote editorials, engaged in litigation, appealed to legislators, and waged political campaigns to protect his business interests. Running as a Republican, he was twice elected, in 1900 and 1902, to represent Coos and Curry counties in the Oregon House of Representatives. According to his biographer, he voted self-interest first and conservative positions second, resisting Populist ideas in vogue at the time.

Among his publications were a series of articles about fish management, collected and reprinted as Salmon of the Pacific Coast in 1893. Despite his efforts to maintain a steady fish supply through egg-collecting and fish-rearing, salmon catches on the Rogue, rising in some years and falling in others, generally declined over time. Seventeen years after Hume's death in 1908, the state closed the river to commercial fishing.

== Early life ==
Robert Hume, the youngest surviving boy in a family of 12 children, was born in Augusta, Maine, on October 31, 1845. Because his parents, William and Elizabeth Hume, had little money, he was adopted by the Robert Denistons when he was four years old. After growing up on the Deniston farm, he went to San Francisco at the age of 18 to work in a cannery operated by two of his brothers, Hapgood-Hume Company. In 1867, when Hume was 22, he and his brothers, who had moved north to Oregon, opened the first cannery on the Columbia River near Astoria. In 1869 he married Celia Bryant, with whom he had two children. The first, a girl, died while still a baby. The second, a boy, died at age 4 in 1875, and Celia Hume died shortly thereafter. Celia and the two children were buried in Lone Fir Cemetery in Portland.

Although Hume had prospered, buying several Columbia River canneries between 1872 and 1876, when his wife and children died, he sold most of his holdings and returned to San Francisco. There he bought a steamer, the Alexander Duncan, and searching for new purpose in life, traveled north along the Oregon coast. While visiting Ellensburg (later renamed Gold Beach), he decided to buy a salmon fishery near the mouth of the Rogue River in Curry County. There in late 1876, "he took up his career once again in one of the most isolated and desolate sections of the Pacific Coast".

== Lower Rogue empire ==
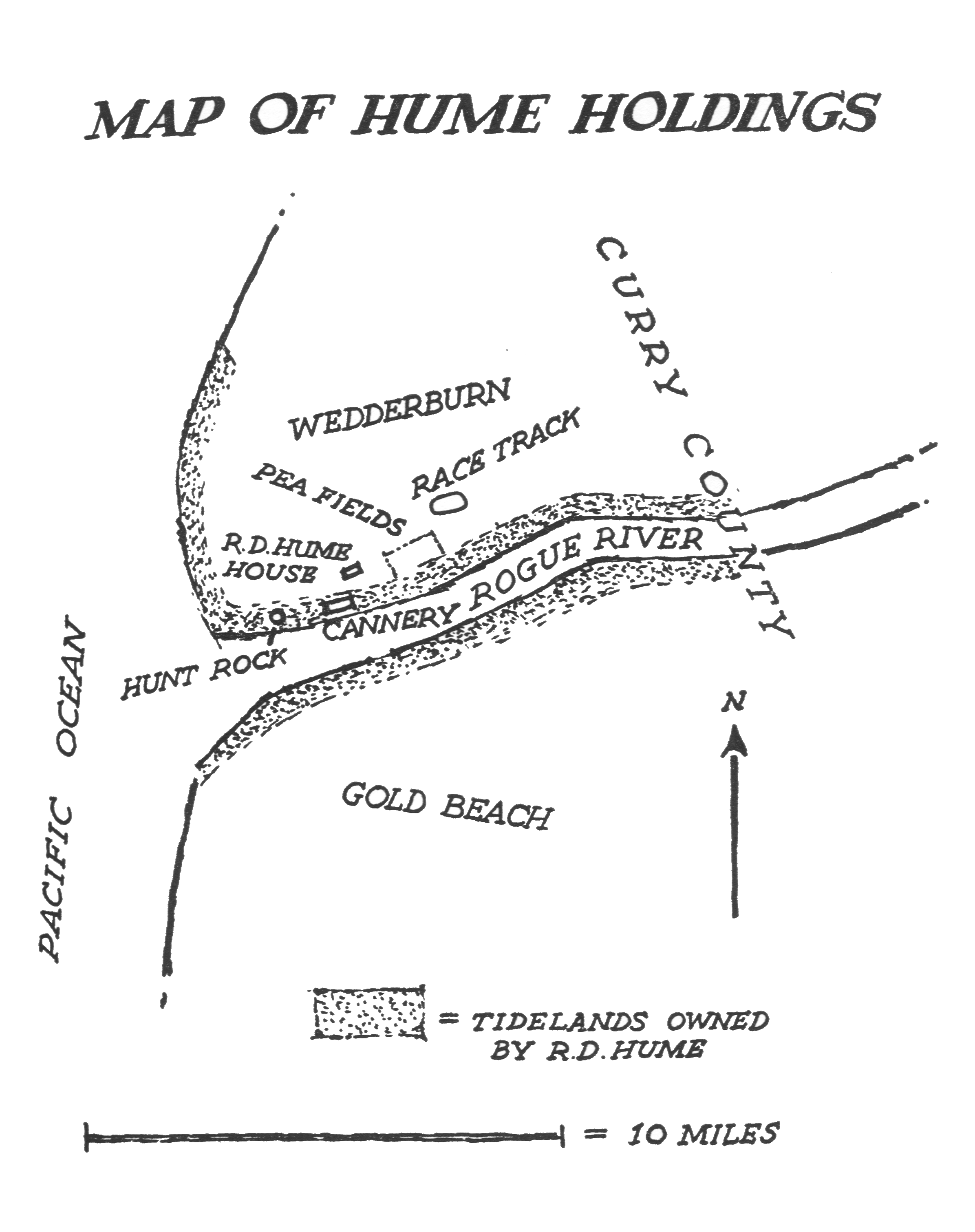
Map of Hume's holdings along the Rogue. Published in 1893 in Hume's book, Salmon of the Pacific Coast.

After building a cannery, warehouse, bunkhouse, mess hall, and other buildings and hiring fishermen, Hume opened his salmon business in 1877. He acquired ownership of all the tidelands along both sides of the lowermost 12 miles (19 km) of the river; this gave him virtual control of fish populations migrating between the ocean and spawning beds upstream. Over the next 32 years, Hume's company caught, processed, and shipped hundreds of tons of salmon from the Rogue. Meanwhile, he remarried and expanded his business interests to include a store, hatchery, hotel, saloon, and sawmill, and other enterprises involving shipping, a newspaper (the Gold Beach Gazette), real estate, and ranching.

After a fire destroyed the hatchery and several other Hume buildings in 1893, he moved many of his holdings to the opposite side of the river, where he founded the city of Wedderburn in 1895, naming it "in honor of the ancestral castle of the Humes of Scotland". Floating some of his unburned buildings to Wedderburn from Ellensburg, he added a new hatchery, offices, a new home, many other buildings, and a horse-racing track. He started another newspaper, the Wedderburn Radium, and applied successfully for a post office, which opened in 1898 and was run by a Hume employee in Hume's general store.

As his businesses grew, he added to his fleet of ships, big ones to ship salmon to San Francisco and smaller ones for shallow waters and for towing larger ships in and out of the Rogue mouth. In 1879 he bought the steamer Varuna and the tug Mary Hume and started a shipyard at Ellensburg. In 1880 he added the steam schooner Mary D. Hume, the tug Pelican in 1883, the schooner Berwick in 1887, the steamer Thistle in 1888, and replacement craft in subsequent years. Returning ships brought goods for Hume's general store.

Throughout his career, the store was one of the central components of his business. It was a center of supplies and news for the people of the Rogue, who awaited the arrival of the fall provision ship with anticipation and anxiety, for this vessel was the only source of winter provisions. It provided Hume, the employer of the great majority of the citizens of Gold Beach and Wedderburn, with a means of repossessing the wages of his employees and of profiting on the exchange.

Hume became known as the Salmon King of Oregon and referred to himself as a "pygmy monopolist" in an autobiography published in the Radium between 1904 and 1906.

== Politician ==
According to Hume's biographer, Gordon B. Dodds, Hume "entered politics both as officeholder and as lobbyist to protect his realm from the assaults of anti-monopolists". Between 1890 and 1910 in Oregon, Populist–Progressive coalitions led by W.S. U'Ren and Governor Sylvester Pennoyer, a Democrat, battled business-oriented Republican factions based in Portland. In 1892, John H. Upton, the Populist candidate for the state legislature from Coos and Curry counties campaigned mainly in opposition to Hume's monopoly on the Rogue. Political threats like the one posed by Upton as well as threats from the Alaska Packers' Association (APA), which had begun fishing the Rogue, led Hume to write political editorials, file lawsuits, endorse candidates, petition the legislature, and eventually to run for office himself.

In 1894, Hume, hoping for a seat in the state legislature, campaigned in support of Populist demands such as unlimited coinage of silver, more regulation of large corporations (like the APA), and large-scale government spending for internal improvements. Dodds says that this approach "illustrates Hume's view of the purpose of a political campaign: The program advocated should be one that would win, and not necessarily the program that the party or the candidate believed in." After losing this election, Hume went to Salem, the state capital, in 1895 to lobby for bills that might favor his business interests. In 1896 Hume, switching to the Republican Party, used his newspaper, the Wedderburn Gazette, to support Republican William McKinley for the U.S. presidency.

In 1900 Hume, running as a Republican, narrowly won election to represent Coos and Curry counties in the state legislature. Shortly after taking office, Hume helped scuttle a bill to repeal a law passed in 1899 that gave the owner of tidelands the exclusive right to fish the waters in front of them. Since Hume owned all the tidelands on the Rogue, the law gave him a monopoly on fishing its lower reaches. On issues unrelated to his business interests, Hume generally voted conservative. He won re-election in 1902, garnering 934 votes—less than half of the total cast—to the Democrat's 807, the Socialist's 219, and the Prohibition Party's 142. During his second term, Hume fought to keep the tidelands law intact and continued to support laissez-faire government and low taxes. Hume attempted but failed to win nomination for a seat in the state Senate in 1904, a seat in the state House of Representatives in 1906, and a seat in the state Senate in 1908. Dodds sums up Hume's political career by saying:

His accomplishments as a legislator were slight; only one of his bills ever passed. On the other hand, he spoke and voted against many measures that were defeated and his credo of legislative decision was, first, his own interests and, second, support of a conservative position. In the midst of the Progressive era he remained a "stalwart among the stalwarts", although during the Populist regime he had expediently yielded for a time to free silver.

== Hatcheries ==
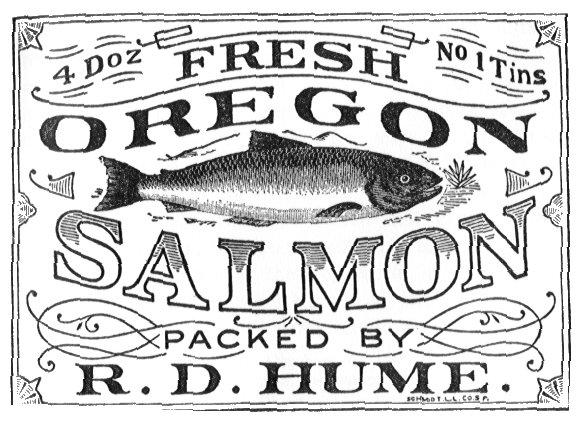
Label from one of Hume's salmon cans

Although Hume had shown no early interest in salmon conservation on the Columbia and elsewhere, on the Rogue he tried to protect the fish supply. Disappointed with his company's catch in 1877, he built a hatchery in Ellensburg, and in all but 7 of his 32 years on the river he operated hatcheries along the Rogue.

Through his newspapers, lawsuits, lobbying, and speeches made while a member of the Oregon Legislature, Hume tried to influence public opinion about artificial fish propagation. In 1893, he published a series of articles, later reprinted as Salmon of the Pacific Coast, that summarized his ideas about ichthyology. In 1897, Hume persuaded the United States Fish Commission to run an egg-collecting station at Elk Creek 150 miles (240 km) from the mouth of the Rogue. Hume built the station, and the government paid the salaries of the workers who collected the eggs and shipped them to Hume's hatchery in Wedderburn. (Note: To protect the eggs from hatching en route, they were packed in crates of wet moss, and the crates were packed in boxes filled with ice and sawdust. The boxes were shipped by horse-drawn wagon to Medford, then by train to Portland or San Francisco, then by steamer to Hume's hatchery 150 miles (240 km) downstream from the egg-collecting station. The eggs could not be shipped via the Rogue itself because parts of it were largely unnavigable.) Although his observations on salmon were well received in some quarters, they "often conflicted with the opinions of other pioneers in the field", and his attempts to control upriver fishing and dams met with resistance and with arguments that he was overfishing the river at its mouth.

Despite Hume's attempts to preserve the fishery, fish runs, oscillating from year to year for a variety of reasons, trended downward over time. The total reported Rogue River salmon catch in 1877, Hume's first year on the Rogue, was 531,000 pounds (241,000 kg); the peak catch during Hume's life was 1,632,000 pounds (740,000 kg) in 1890, and the catch in 1908, the year of Hume's death, was 476,000 pounds (216,000 kg). As fish runs continued to diminish, the state legislature closed the river to commercial fishing in 1935.

== Family life, death, and legacy ==
In December 1877, the year after his move to Ellensburg, Hume married Mary Duncan, the 19-year-old daughter of a former New Zealander, George Duncan, who had lost his fortune in the stock market and hoped to make another by canning salmon in the U.S. According to Dodds, Mary led a relatively secluded life, working in her flower garden, writing letters, and talking to friends, and occasionally selecting clothing for Hume's store or acting as his secretary when he was sick. Although business occupied Hume most of the time, he seemed to value his wife's help, Dodds says, and "events indicated their mutual affection".

In October 1908 Hume was traveling on the schooner Osprey, which was towing another ship, Enterprise, when a storm arose. The Enterprise was wrecked, but Osprey rescued its crew and arrived safely in Wedderburn. Hume, who had been exposed to wet and cold, grew ill, rallied briefly, then died on November 17. According to Dodds, "His dying wish was that he be buried at Hunt Rock overlooking his empire on the Rogue." In 1912, after she had sold the Hume holdings in Curry County, Mary Hume had Hume's body moved to San Francisco.

Opinions vary about Hume's fish theories and practices, which influenced state and federal salmon management for many decades after his death. "Hume was ahead of his time", Dodds says, "in his belief in hatcheries, in his practice of retaining fry [immature fish] in feeding ponds, and in his belief in the home-stream theory of salmonology." Another writer says that "Robert Hume's efforts to restock the Rogue with hatchery fish were an early glimmer in the dawning of a new era on the river and in the nation at large" even though "his motives may have been suspect, and the practice a less-than-perfect solution". Environmental historian Joseph Taylor says that while many Oregonians regarded Hume as a salmon expert, "his reputation often exceeded his results". A late 20th-century fisheries scientist sees Hume as "a keen observer of the salmon's natural history, although he did not always interpret his observations correctly."

== Sources ==
- Dodds, Gordon B. (1959). The Salmon King of Oregon: R.D. Hume and the Pacific Fisheries. Chapel Hill: The University of North Carolina Press. OCLC 469312613.
- Dorband, Roger (2006). The Rogue: Portrait of a River. Portland, Oregon: Raven Studios. ISBN 978-0-9728609-3-2.
- Hume, R. D. (1961). Dodds, Gordon B. (ed.). A Pygmy Monopolist: The Life and Doings of R.D. Hume Written by Himself and Dedicated to His Neighbors. Madison, Wisconsin: The State Historical Society of Wisconsin for the Department of History, University of Wisconsin. ISBN 978-1-258-46766-1. OCLC 560885578.
- Lichatowich, James A. (1999). Salmon Without Rivers: A History of the Pacific Salmon Crisis. Washington, D.C.: Island Press. ISBN 978-1-55963-361-1.
- Taylor, Joseph E. III. (1999). Making Salmon: An Environmental History of the Northwest Fisheries Crisis. Seattle: University of Washington Press. ISBN 978-0-295-98114-7.
