= Gable Mansion =

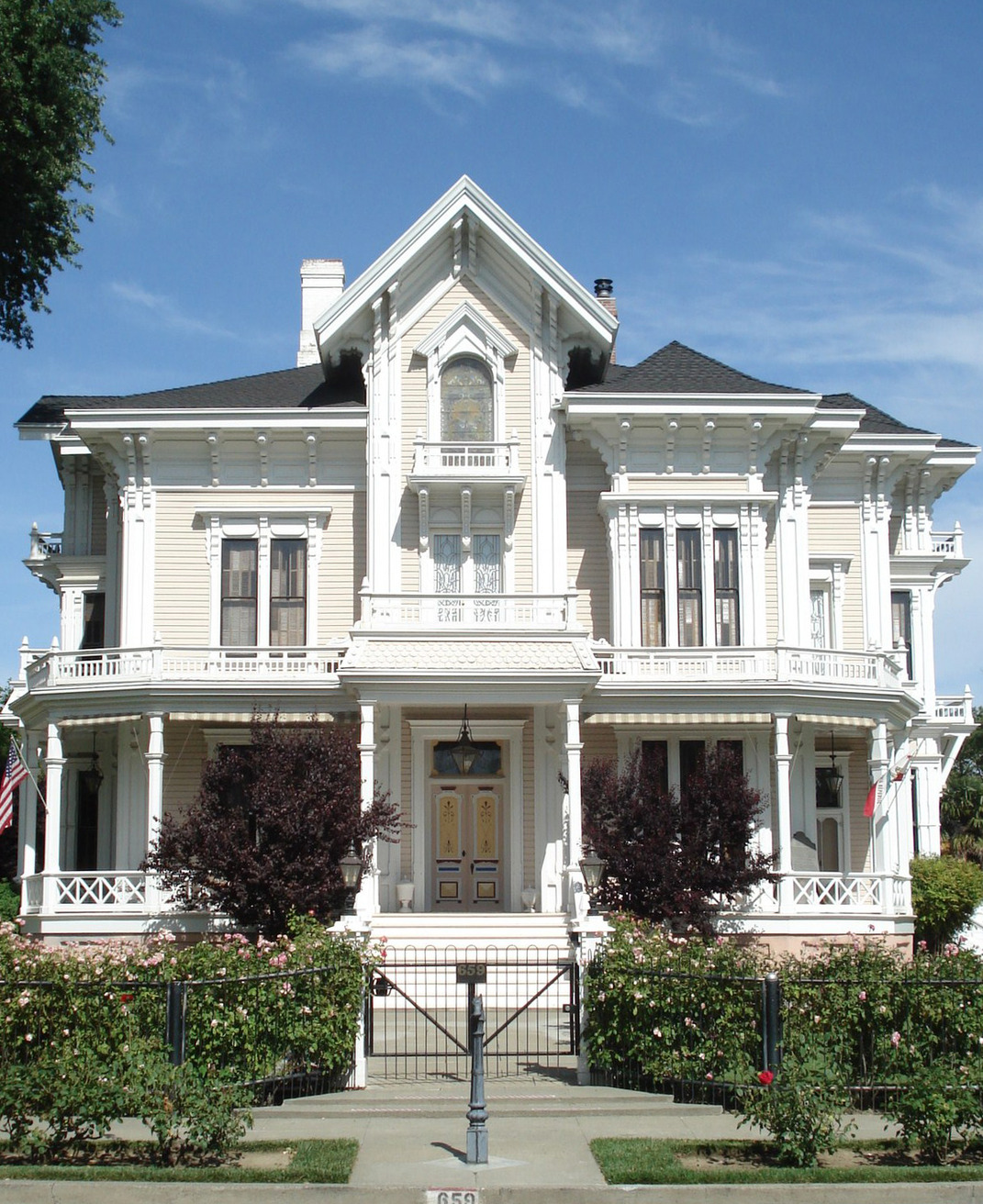
- The face of the house as seen from the street
- Interactive map of Gable Mansion
- Location: 659 First Street, Woodland, California
- Coordinates: 38°40′21.16″N 121°46′22.29″W
- Built: 1885
- Architectural style: Victorian Italianate
- Governing body: private

California Historical Landmark
- Designated: 1885
- Reference no.: 864

The Gable Mansion is a Victorian mansion in Woodland, California, listed as a California Historical Landmark, that was built in 1885 for Amos and Harvey Gable, two Yolo County pioneers and ranchers.

== History ==
The Gable brothers, Amos W. and Harvey C. Gable, had the home designed and built for them at 659 First Street by Edward Carlton "Carl" Gilbert, the owner of the Woodland firm Gilbert & Sons, for $16,000. Joseph Baird, a former professor of Art History at the University of California, Davis, has described it as "a locally unique variant of the Stick style of Victorian architecture in vogue in the 1880s".

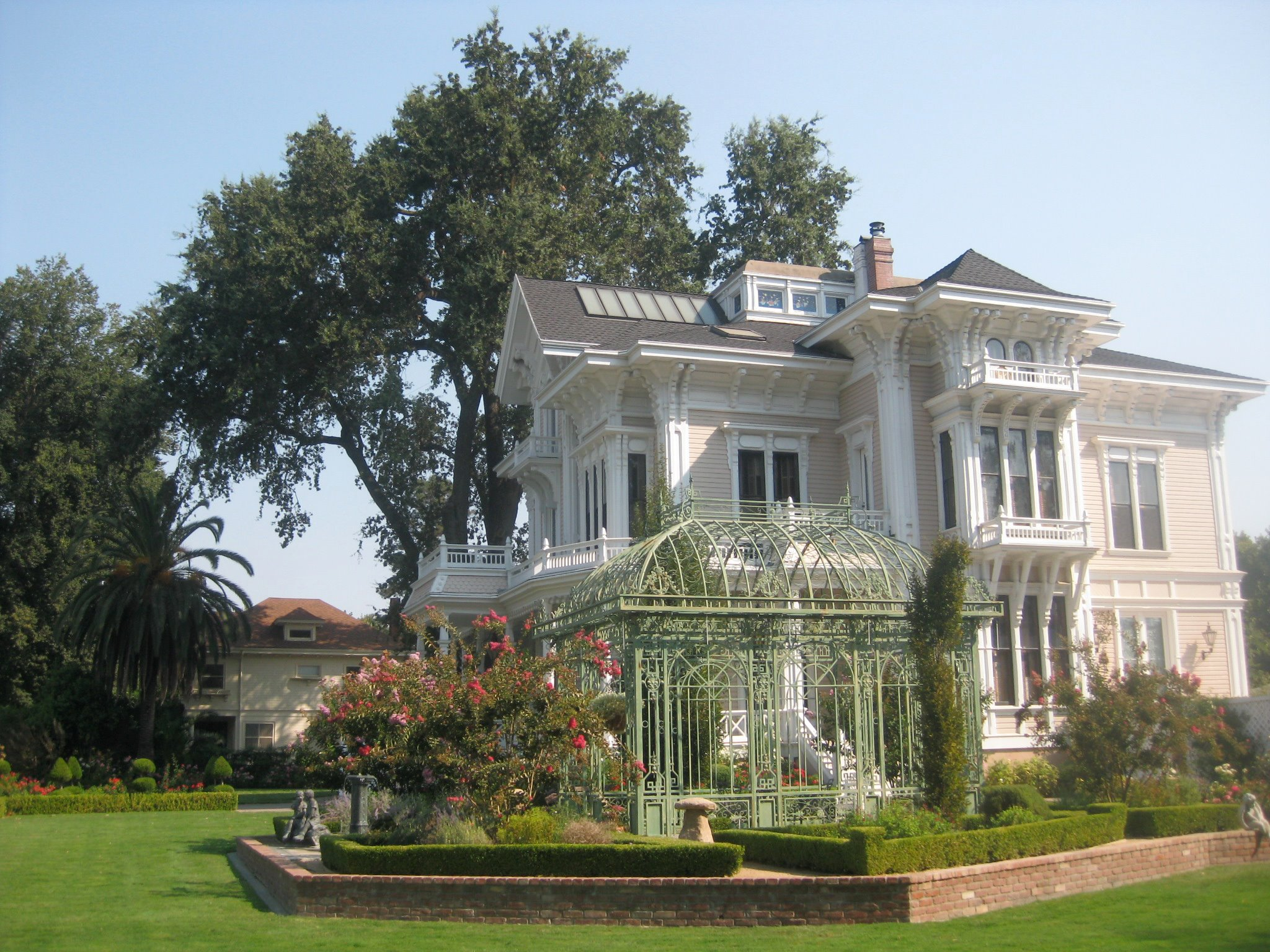
Side view of the Gable Mansion, looking north.

The first floor plan of the Gable Mansion includes a central "stair hall" that has a curved stairway visible from the front entrance. The second story has several bedrooms and (although rumored to be a ballroom) the third story was an attic. It has since been remodeled into living space. An elevation and first-floor plan of the Gable Mansion, published by Gilbert in the October 1887 edition of the California Architect and Building News, a trade journal of the American Institute of Architects' San Francisco chapter, show similarities with another house published several years earlier.

During the 1970s and 1980s many Woodland residents began to restore historic residences south of Main Street. In 1972 Robert McWhirk purchased the Gable Mansion from the Gable estate and spent twenty years rehabilitating it. The house is decorated with murals, which have been repainted. It was registered as a California State Landmark on September 13, 1973, as an example of 19th-century Victorian Italianate architecture and for being "one of the last of its style, size, and proportion in California".
