= List of elections in 1894 =

The following elections occurred in the year 1894.

== North America ==
=== Canada ===
- 1894 British Columbia general election
- 1894 Edmonton municipal election
- 1894 Northwest Territories general election
- 1894 Ontario prohibition plebiscite
- 1894 Ontario general election

=== United States ===
- 1894 Minnesota Senate election
- 1894 New York state election
- 1894 United States elections

==== United States Senate ====
- 1894 and 1895 United States Senate elections

==== United States House of Representatives ====
- 1894 United States House of Representatives elections
- 1894 United States House of Representatives elections in Alabama
- 1894 Alabama's 3rd congressional district special election
- 1894 United States House of Representatives election in Arizona Territory
- 1894 United States House of Representatives elections in Arkansas
- 1894 Arkansas's 2nd congressional district special election
- 1894 United States House of Representatives elections in California
- 1894 United States House of Representatives elections in Colorado
- 1894 United States House of Representatives elections in Connecticut
- 1894 United States House of Representatives election in Delaware
- 1894 United States House of Representatives elections in Florida
- 1894 United States House of Representatives elections in Georgia
- 1894 United States House of Representatives election in Idaho
- 1894 United States House of Representatives elections in Illinois
- 1894 United States House of Representatives elections in Indiana
- 1894 United States House of Representatives elections in Iowa
- 1894 United States House of Representatives elections in Kansas
- 1894 United States House of Representatives elections in Kentucky
- 1894 Kentucky's 9th congressional district special election
- 1894 Kentucky's 10th congressional district special election
- 1894 United States House of Representatives elections in Louisiana
- 1894 Louisiana's 4th congressional district special election
- 1894 United States House of Representatives elections in Maine
- 1894 United States House of Representatives elections in Maryland
- 1894 Maryland's 1st congressional district special election
- 1894 Maryland's 5th congressional district special election
- 1894 United States House of Representatives elections in Massachusetts
- 1894 United States House of Representatives elections in Michigan
- 1894 United States House of Representatives elections in Minnesota
- 1894 United States House of Representatives elections in Mississippi
- 1894 United States House of Representatives elections in Missouri
- 1894 United States House of Representatives election in Montana
- 1894 United States House of Representatives elections in Nebraska
- 1894 United States House of Representatives election in Nevada
- 1894 United States House of Representatives elections in New Hampshire
- 1894 United States House of Representatives elections in New Jersey
- 1894 United States House of Representatives election in New Mexico Territory
- 1894 United States House of Representatives elections in New York
- 1894 New York's 14th congressional district special election
- 1894 New York's 15th congressional district special election
- 1894 United States House of Representatives elections in North Carolina
- 1894 United States House of Representatives election in North Dakota
- 1894 United States House of Representatives elections in Ohio
- 1894 Ohio's 2nd congressional district special election
- 1894 Ohio's 3rd congressional district special election
- 1894 United States House of Representatives election in Oklahoma Territory
- 1894 United States House of Representatives elections in Oregon
- 1894 United States House of Representatives elections in Pennsylvania
- 1894 Pennsylvania's at-large congressional district special election
- 1894 United States House of Representatives elections in Rhode Island
- 1894 United States House of Representatives elections in South Carolina
- 1894 South Carolina's 1st congressional district special election
- 1894 South Carolina's 4th congressional district special election
- 1894 United States House of Representatives election in South Dakota
- 1894 United States House of Representatives elections in Tennessee
- 1894 United States House of Representatives elections in Texas
- 1894 United States House of Representatives election in Utah Territory
- 1894 United States House of Representatives elections in Vermont
- 1894 United States House of Representatives elections in Virginia
- 1894 Virginia's 7th congressional district special election
- 1894 United States House of Representatives election in Washington
- 1894 United States House of Representatives elections in West Virginia
- 1894 United States House of Representatives elections in Wisconsin
- 1894 Wisconsin's 7th congressional district special election
- 1894 United States House of Representatives election in Wyoming

==== United States lieutenant gubernatorial ====
- 1894 California lieutenant gubernatorial election
- 1894 Connecticut lieutenant gubernatorial election
- 1894 Minnesota lieutenant gubernatorial election
- 1894 Nebraska lieutenant gubernatorial election
- 1894 Texas lieutenant gubernatorial election
- 1894 Wisconsin lieutenant gubernatorial election

==== United States gubernatorial ====
- 1894 Alabama gubernatorial election
- 1894 Arkansas gubernatorial election
- 1894 California gubernatorial election
- 1894 Colorado gubernatorial election
- 1894 Connecticut gubernatorial election
- 1894 Delaware gubernatorial election
- 1894 Georgia gubernatorial election
- 1894 Idaho gubernatorial election
- 1894 Kansas gubernatorial election
- 1894 Maine gubernatorial election
- 1894 Massachusetts gubernatorial election
- 1894 Michigan gubernatorial election
- 1894 Minnesota gubernatorial election
- 1894 Nebraska gubernatorial election
- 1894 Nevada gubernatorial election
- 1894 New Hampshire gubernatorial election
- 1894 New York gubernatorial election
- 1894 North Dakota gubernatorial election
- 1894 Oregon gubernatorial election
- 1894 Pennsylvania gubernatorial election
- 1894 Rhode Island gubernatorial election
- 1894 South Carolina gubernatorial election
- 1894 South Dakota gubernatorial election
- 1894 Tennessee gubernatorial election
- 1894 Texas gubernatorial election
- 1894 United States gubernatorial elections
- 1894 Vermont gubernatorial election
- 1894 Wisconsin gubernatorial election
- 1894 Wyoming gubernatorial election

==== United States mayoral elections ====
- 1894 Boston mayoral election
- 1894 Manchester, New Hampshire, mayoral election
- 1894 New York City mayoral election

== South America ==
- 1894 Brazilian general election
- 1894 Chilean parliamentary election
- 1894 Peruvian presidential election

== Europe ==
- 1894 Belgian general election
- 1894 Bulgarian parliamentary election
- 1894 Dutch general election
- 1894 Liechtenstein general election
- 1894 Liechtenstein local elections
- 1894 Norwegian parliamentary election
- 1894 Portuguese legislative election

=== United Kingdom ===
- 1894 Attercliffe by-election
- 1894 Berwickshire by-election
- 1894 Forfarshire by-election
- 1894 Hackney South by-election
- 1894 Linlithgowshire by-election
- 1894 Montgomeryshire by-election
- 1894 Rotherhithe by-election
- 1894 Rushcliffe by-election
- 1894 South Leeds by-election
- 1894 United Kingdom local elections

== Oceania ==
=== New Zealand ===
- 1894 Waitemata by-election

== See also ==
- Category:1894 elections
