= 1894 Edinburgh Corporation election =

Local election in Scotland

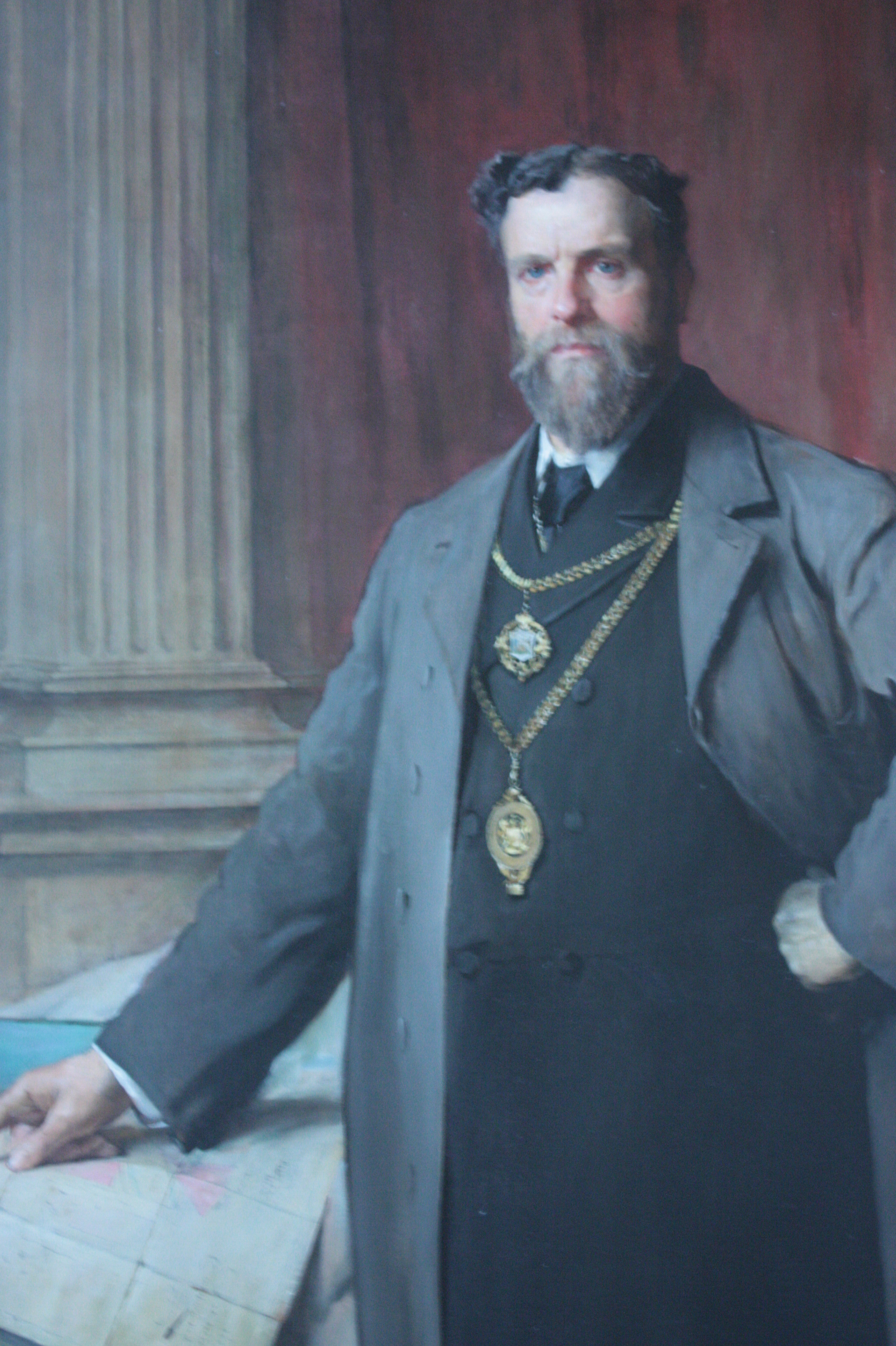
McDonald (pictured) replaced Russell as Lord Provost following the election.

An Election to the Edinburgh Corporation was held on 6 November 1894, alongside municipal elections across Scotland, and the wider British local elections. Elections took place in 5 of the cities 13 wards, with candidates in the remaining 8 being returned unopposed. A candidate, Thomas Blake, had intended to run against incumbent Lord Provost James Russell in St Cuthbert's Ward; however, due to a mistake at the nomination, Blake could not be accepted as a candidate.

Following the election the balance of power on the Corporation remained unchanged, divided between 21 Unionists and 20 Liberals. The composition, combined with a number of Liberals pledging to oppose the re-election of the Liberal Lord Provost James Russell, saw Russell replaced as Lord Provost with the Unionist candidate; Sir Andrew McDonald.

Turnout in the contested wards was 12,145 out of a total electorate of 18,741 (64.80%).

== Aggregate results ==
Edinburgh Corporation election, 1894 (Contested seats)
Party	Seats	Gains	Losses	Net gain/loss	Seats %	Votes %	Votes	+/−
Liberal	3					52.93	6,428	
Unionist	2					44.46	5,400	
SSF	0					2.17	263	
Independent	0					0.44	54	

== Ward results ==
Results by ward.

Calton 1 seat Electorate: 4929 Spoiled votes: 11
Party	Candidate	Votes	%	±%
Liberal	R. A. Douglas	1.822		
Unionist	Daniel Crerat	1,436		
Majority		386		
Turnout		3,258		
Liberal hold		Swing		

Broughton 1 seat Electorate: 2367 Spoiled votes: 2
Party	Candidate	Votes	%	±%
Unionist	Councillor Hunter	648	50.86	
Liberal	W. K. Rose	626	49.14	
Majority		22	1.72	
Turnout		1,274	53.82	
Unionist hold		Swing		

St. Georges 1 seat Electorate: 4088 Spoiled votes: 9
Party	Candidate	Votes	%	±%
Liberal	Councillor Scott	1,515		
Unionist	J. W. Mackie	1,164		
Majority		351		
Turnout		2,679		
Liberal hold		Swing		

St. Giles 1 seat Electorate: 2861 Spoiled votes: 7
Party	Candidate	Votes	%	±%
Liberal	Councillor Mitchell	1,055	56.45	
Unionist	Duncan McLaren	497	26.59	
SSF	James Connolly	263	14.07	
Independent	James Gardiner	54	2.89	
Majority		558	29.86	
Turnout		1,869	65.33	
Liberal hold		Swing		

George Square 1 seat Electorate: 4496 Spoiled votes: 16
Party	Candidate	Votes	%	±%
Unionist	Councillor Forbes MacKay	1,655	54.00	
Liberal	Peter Whyte	1,410	46.00	
Majority		245	8.00	
Turnout		3,065	68.17	
Unionist hold		Swing		

St Cuthbert's 1 seat
Party	Candidate	Votes	%	±%
Liberal	Lord Provost James Russell	Unopposed	N/A	N/A
Liberal hold				
