= Francis Peabody =

Francis Peabody may refer to:

- Francis Greenwood Peabody (1847–1936), minister and professor of theology at Harvard University
- Francis H. Peabody, co-founder of Kidder, Peabody & Co.
- Francis S. Peabody (1858–1922), American businessman who founded Peabody Coal
- Francis Weld Peabody (1881–1927), American physician
- Francis Peabody Jr. (1854–1938), American lawyer, sportsman, businessman and political figure
- Francis Peabody (businessman), founder of Chatham, New Brunswick
