= 1894 Leith Burgh Council election =

An Election to Leith Burgh Council was held on 6 November 1894, alongside the municipal elections across Scotland, and the wider British local elections. Contests took place in 3 of the burghs 6 wards, with candidates in the remaining 3 being returned unopposed.

== Aggregate results ==
Leigh Burgh Council election, 1894 (Contested seats)
Party	Seats	Gains	Losses	Net gain/loss	Seats %	Votes %	Votes	+/−
Independent	3							

== Ward results ==
First Ward 1 seat
Party	Candidate	Votes	%	±%
Independent	G. Craig	617		
Independent	Rendall	454		
Majority		163		
Turnout		1071		
Independent hold		Swing		

Third Ward 1 seat
Party	Candidate	Votes	%	±%
Independent	Gibson	614		
Independent	Inglis	482		
Independent	Dickson	473		
Independent	Sword	376		
Majority		132		
Turnout		1945		
Independent hold		Swing		
