= 1866 Oregon gubernatorial election =

- June 4, 1866
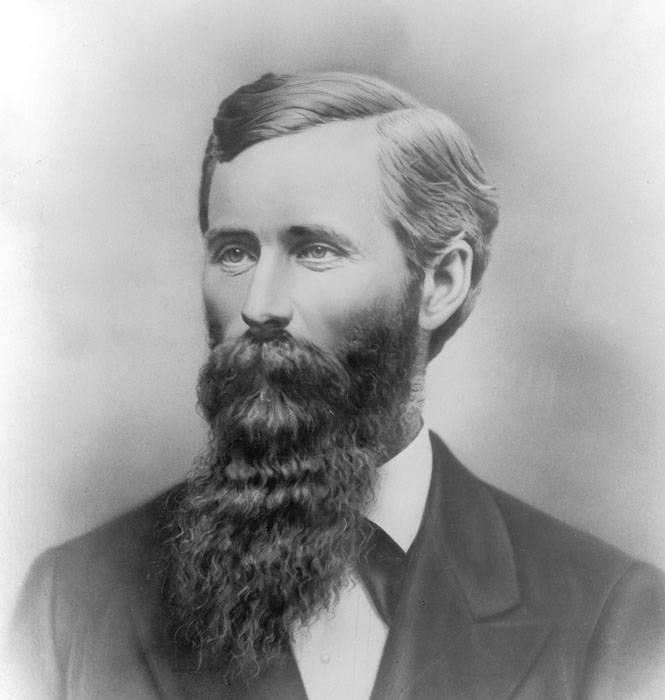

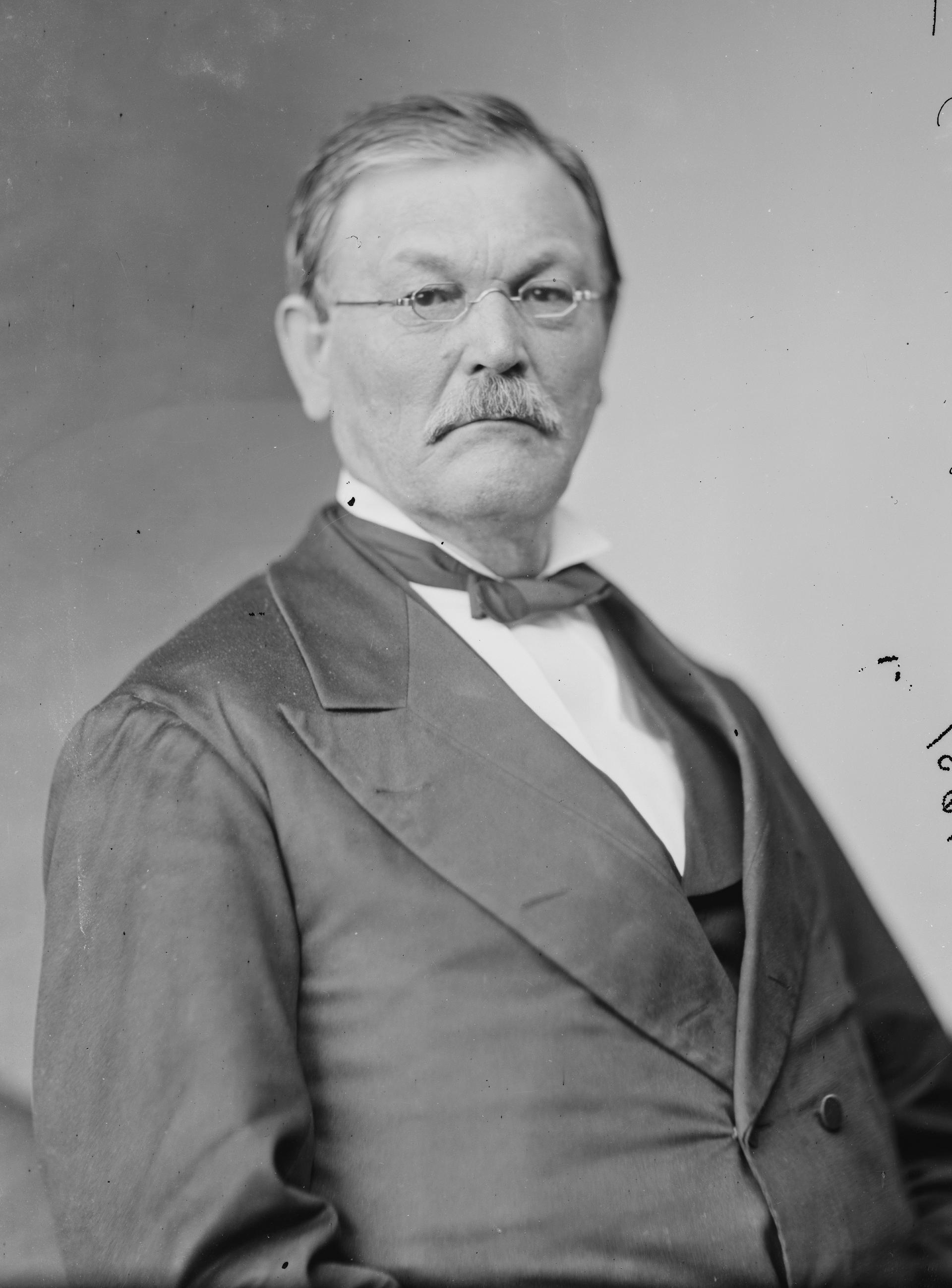
Nominee	George Lemuel Woods	James K. Kelly
Party	Republican	Democratic
Popular vote	10,316	10,039
Percentage	50.68%	49.32%
- County results Woods: 50–60% 60–70% 70–80% Kelly: 50–60% 60–70%
Governor before election
A. C. Gibbs
Republican
Elected Governor
George L. Woods
Republican

The 1866 Oregon gubernatorial election took place on June 4, 1866, to elect the governor of the U.S. state of Oregon. The election matched Republican George Lemuel Woods against Democrat James Kerr Kelly.

== Results ==
1866 Oregon gubernatorial election
Party	Candidate	Votes	%	±%
Republican	George Lemuel Woods	10,316	50.68%	−16.40%
Democratic	James K. Kelly	10,039	49.32%	+16.40%
Total votes		20,355	100.00%	
Majority		277	1.36%	
Republican hold		Swing	-32.79%	

=== Results by county ===
County	George L. Woods Republican		James K. Kelly Democratic		Margin		Total votes cast
County	#	%	#	%	#	%	Total votes cast
Baker	283	48.63%	299	51.37%	-16	-2.75%	582
Benton	527	51.62%	494	48.38%	33	3.23%	1,021
Clackamas	682	54.91%	560	45.09%	122	9.82%	1,242
Clatsop	117	70.91%	48	29.09%	69	41.82%	165
Columbia	84	44.68%	104	55.32%	-20	-10.64%	188
Coos	135	61.36%	85	38.64%	50	22.73%	220
Curry	58	58.00%	42	42.00%	16	16.00%	100
Douglas	631	53.66%	545	46.34%	86	7.31%	1,176
Grant	317	55.52%	254	44.48%	63	11.03%	571
Jackson	562	44.85%	691	55.15%	-129	-10.30%	1,253
Josephine	153	46.08%	179	53.92%	-26	-7.83%	332
Lane	579	45.27%	700	54.73%	-121	-9.46%	1,279
Linn	1,020	45.27%	1,233	54.73%	-213	-9.45%	2,253
Marion	1,380	62.36%	833	37.64%	547	24.72%	2,213
Multnomah	1,205	54.04%	1,025	45.96%	180	8.07%	2,230
Polk	560	49.78%	565	50.22%	-5	-0.44%	1,125
Tillamook	47	54.65%	39	45.35%	8	9.30%	86
Umatilla	270	34.31%	517	65.69%	-247	-31.39%	787
Union	318	38.92%	499	61.08%	-181	-22.15%	817
Wasco	355	46.22%	413	53.78%	-58	-7.55%	768
Washington	465	56.43%	359	43.57%	106	12.86%	824
Yamhill	568	50.58%	555	49.42%	13	1.16%	1,123
Total	10,316	50.68%	10,039	49.32%	277	1.36%	20,355

==== Counties that flipped from Republican to Democratic ====
- Columbia
- Jackson
- Lane
- Linn
- Polk
- Wasco
