= Governor Shafer =

Governor Shafer may refer to:

- George F. Shafer (1888–1948), 16th Governor of North Dakota
- Raymond P. Shafer (1917–2006), 39th Governor of Pennsylvania

== See also ==
- William Donald Schaefer (1921–2011), 58th Governor of Maryland
- Ed Schafer (born 1946), 30th Governor of North Dakota
- John Shaffer (governor) (1827–1870), Governor of Utah Territory in 1870
- Víctor Manzanilla Schaffer (1924–2019), Governor of Yucatán from 1988 to 1991
