= Endicott Peabody (educator) =

American educator (1857–1944)

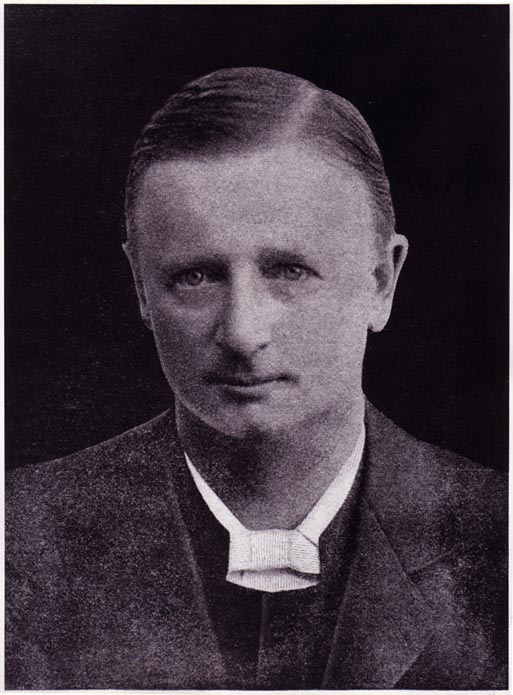
- Born: May 31, 1857; Salem, Massachusetts, U.S.
- Died: November 17, 1944 (aged 87); Groton, Massachusetts, U.S.
- Other name: Cotty
- Education: Trinity College, Cambridge; Episcopal Theological School
- Spouse: Fannie Peabody
- Children: 6, including Malcolm
- Parent(s): Samuel Endicott Peabody; Marianne Cabot Lee
- Relatives: Francis Peabody Jr. (brother); Marietta Peabody Tree (granddaughter); Endicott Peabody (grandson)
- Church: Episcopal Church
- Ordained: 1884

Signature
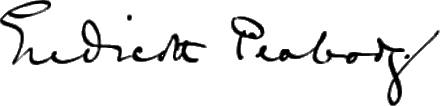

Reverend Endicott Peabody (May 31, 1857 – November 17, 1944) was an American Episcopal priest who founded Groton School in 1884 and Brooks School in 1926. He also founded St. Paul's Episcopal Church (Tombstone, Arizona) in 1882 and St. Andrew's Episcopal Church (Ayer, Massachusetts) in 1899.

Peabody served as Groton's headmaster from 1884 until 1940, in which capacity he educated Franklin Delano Roosevelt. Upon his death, Time magazine described him as "the most famed U.S. headmaster of his generation."

== Early life and family ==
Peabody was born in Salem, Massachusetts on either May 30 or 31, 1857 to Samuel Endicott Peabody and Marianne Cabot Lee. He had three brothers and one sister: John, a banker; Francis, a lawyer; Martha, who married into a prominent family in Groton, Massachusetts; and George, a banker.

The Peabodys were "one of the oldest Massachusetts families." Lt. Francis Peabody moved to Ipswich, Massachusetts in 1635, fifteen years after the first landing at Plymouth Rock. Endicott's great-grandfather was Salem shipowner and privateer Joseph Peabody, who made a fortune importing pepper from Sumatra, and was one of the wealthiest men in the United States when he died in 1844. Through his paternal grandmother he was descended from Massachusetts Bay Colony governor John Endecott, who founded Salem in 1628.

Due to his lineage, Peabody grew up extremely well-connected. His father was a Boston merchant and an associate of J. P. Morgan. His mother was the daughter of John Clarke Lee, the founder of the financial firm Lee, Higginson & Co. His cousin was Alice Hathaway Lee, the first wife of President Theodore Roosevelt; Peabody was an usher at their wedding.

In 1885, Peabody married his first cousin, Fannie Peabody, daughter of Francis (Samuel's brother) and Helen (Bloodgood) Peabody. They had six children. His son Malcolm E. Peabody was bishop of the Episcopal Diocese of Central New York. His grandchildren included Massachusetts governor Endicott H. Peabody and UNCHR representative Marietta Peabody Tree. His great-grandchildren include author Frances FitzGerald, model Penelope Tree, and actress Kyra Sedgwick.

== Education and early career ==
In 1871, when Peabody was thirteen, his parents sent him to England to attend Cheltenham College, a boarding school with a tradition of sending young British men to the military and colonial civil service. Although Peabody had initially wanted to attend Winchester College, his father approved of Cheltenham's headmaster and his mother disliked the city of Winchester. Peabody graduated from Cheltenham in 1876. He studied law at Trinity College, Cambridge, taking a first in the lower tripos and an LL.B. in 1880. At Trinity he converted from his family's Unitarianism to Anglicanism, over his mother's strenuous objections.

Peabody's parents moved to England in 1875 after his father accepted a partnership at the London banking firm of J. S. Morgan & Co. (the predecessor of J.P. Morgan & Co.), and remained there until Samuel Peabody's death in 1909. By contrast, Peabody returned to America. He disliked the law, so his mother's relatives gave him a job at their brokerage house, which he found equally uninspiring.

== Religious career ==
=== Seminary and early ministry ===
Having tried out law and finance and lost interest in both, Peabody went to Trinity Church rector Phillips Brooks for advice. Brooks encouraged him to attend the Episcopal Theological School in Cambridge, Massachusetts, a stronghold of the Broad Church tendency in the American Episcopal Church. Brooks believed that ETS taught its students to be "eager to train its men to think and reason," and "anxious to blend the most earnest piety with the most active intelligence." Peabody graduated from ETS in 1884.

As a seminarian, Peabody assisted the liberal theologian Leighton Parks at Emmanuel Church in Back Bay; Parks gave him the idea of working at a prep school. (Peabody later repaid Parks by placing him on the Groton School board of trustees and inviting him to give the school's commencement address three times.) He was also heavily influenced by F. W. Robertson, who Stopford Brooke described as "partly a prophet of the old, partly of the new."

=== Ministry in Arizona ===
After his first semester of classes, Peabody was invited to take charge of a fledgling Episcopal congregation in Tombstone, Arizona. He arrived in January 1882, three months after the Gunfight at the O.K. Corral.

Though Peabody felt unqualified, his stay in Tombstone proved that he could attract donors and manage a congregation, two traits he employed to great effect in his educational career. Within months, he raised $5,000 to build St. Paul's Episcopal Church. It opened on June 18, 1882, making it the oldest Protestant church building in Arizona. It was added to the National Register of Historic Places in 1971.

To build up the congregation and raise money, Peabody visited up to 15 homes a day. It is said that he visited saloons to ask gamblers for donations and "would challenge locals to boxing matches on the condition that if he won, they had to come to church on Sunday," although Peabody dismissed most of these stories as apocryphal. Regardless of the specifics, Peabody's outgoing manner won admirers among the locals, including Wyatt Earp, whose family donated the altar rail for the new church.

Peabody was frequently homesick and left Tombstone on July 17, 1882, one month after St. Paul's opened and six months after he arrived in Tombstone. George Whitwell Parson noted in his diary that day, "We will not easily fill Peabody's place."

In 2007, to commemorate the church's 125th anniversary, Peabody was added to the liturgical calendar of the Episcopal Diocese of Arizona. His feast day is November 17.

=== Massachusetts parish priest ===
After returning to Massachusetts, Peabody briefly preached at St. Mark's School, his brother George's alma mater, which was looking for a new headmaster at the time. Founded in 1865, St. Mark's was one of America's first British-style boarding schools. Impressed, the school's founder Joseph Burnett asked Peabody to put himself forward for the headmaster position. However, the trustees chose someone else.

After this rejection, Peabody decided to start his own school. He initially wanted to put the school in Ipswich, where his forefathers had first landed in America, but eventually chose Groton, where his in-laws lived. Local landowners James and Prescott Lawrence donated the land for the school campus, provided that Peabody build a school chapel that would serve both local Episcopalians and the school community. Peabody led Groton School from 1884 to 1940. During this entire time, the Groton School chapel served as the area's parish church.

In 1889, Peabody founded St. Andrew's Episcopal Church to serve as a chapel of ease for people living in Ayer. He recruited talented, ambitious young men for the vicarate. St. Andrew's provided the first practical ministerial experience for Charles Slattery, bishop of Massachusetts, Angus Dun, bishop of Washington, D.C., and William Greenough Thayer, headmaster of St. Mark's School, among others. In 1950, the school's pastoral responsibilities were transferred to St. Andrew's.

== Schoolmaster ==
Groton School opened in 1884. Peabody fashioned the curriculum and lifestyle for boys from upper-class families, whom he wished to steer toward moral leadership, philanthropy, and contributions to the public good. Although Peabody was ambivalent about his own time at boarding school, he was strongly influenced by Cheltenham's emphasis on public service, declaring that "if some Groton boys do not enter political life and do something for our land it won't be because they have not been urged." His public-minded approach, blue-blooded American lineage, and English manners were attractive to wealthy parents who were "privately disgusted with the bringing up of well-to-do American boys of that period." His students eventually included President Theodore Roosevelt’s four sons; Theodore's cousin, the future president Franklin D. Roosevelt; and Morgans, Whitneys, McCormicks, and children of other prominent families.

The school's marketing materials said that the school would "prepar[e] boys for college," but also "cultivate manly, Christian character, having regard to moral and physical as well as intellectual development." Peabody had been a good athlete at Cheltenham, and Groton was one of the first American schools to emphasize organized sports as part of the day-to-day curriculum. Peabody also believed that his (mostly) wealthy students required strict discipline. He refused to allow any student to receive more than 25 cents per week in allowance, authorized hazing (including "pumping," a form of waterboarding) until the 1920s, and expelled Archie Roosevelt for flippantly calling the school "the old Christ factory." To tie these two strands together, Peabody heavily emphasized football, writing that "[i]n these days of exceeding comfort, the boys need an opportunity to endure hardness and, it may be, suffering ... Football has in it the element which goes to make a soldier."

Like his mentor Phillips Brooks and his alma mater Episcopal Theological School, Peabody subscribed to the Broad Church tendency within the Episcopal Church. With respect to ritual, he preferred the low church. Theologically, he was harder to classify: unlike many members of the Broad Church (traditionally considered a safe haven for liberals and progressives), his views could not be classified as straightforwardly liberal or conservative. Rather, he was theologically moderate and socially puritanical, leading his biographer to write that "[t]heological perplexities and subtleties simply did not affect him ... He was just not interested in details of the Higher Criticism or lower skepticism." Another writer said that Peabody "stressed social amelioration through Christian principles rather than strict adherence to the fine points of a particular creed."

Peabody served as the vice president of the Boston Watch and Ward Society, a notoriously censorious organization that gave rise to the phrase "Banned in Boston"; when he caught a student reading Esquire magazine, he encouraged the society to target the magazine, either "making it decent or driving it out of existence." He strongly opposed divorce; according to one story, he banned divorcees from visiting campus "as late as the 1930s", although Cass Canfield recalled that in the 1910s, a third of the student body had divorced parents. However, he was sympathetic to the Social Gospel movement, supported Theodore Roosevelt's efforts to curb the political influence of big business, and frequently invited his "good friend" Jacob Riis, the social reformer, to speak to his students. He also hired several gay or bisexual teachers, including W. Amory Gardner (adopted son of Isabella), who donated the school chapel, and Gardner's (alleged) partner Grafton Cushing, who later served as the lieutenant governor of Massachusetts.

Peabody retired at the end of the 1939–40 school year and died in Groton on November 17, 1944. Upon his death, Time magazine described him as "the most famed U.S. headmaster of his generation."

== Other work ==
Peabody was an active part of the independent school community. He founded Brooks School in 1926 in memory of his mentor Phillips Brooks, who died in 1893; he also chaired its board of trustees. He provided important early support to Baguio School in the Philippines, lending it a faculty member and sending his son Malcolm to teach there. He also served as a trustee of Lawrence Academy at Groton from 1884 to 1908.

Peabody was elected to the American Antiquarian Society in 1891 and the American Academy of Arts and Sciences in 1918. He received honorary degrees from Harvard and Yale. In 1889, the Columbia University board asked him to apply for the Columbia presidency, but he declined.

== Legacy ==
=== Scholarly appraisal ===
Several scholars have discussed Peabody's Groton, principally in the context of college admissions.

In The Chosen (2005), Jerome Karabel writes that the idea of student merit and achievement that Peabody cultivated at Groton—specifically, the elevation of character and physical accomplishments alongside academic excellence—forms the basis of the modern-day American college admissions system. Karabel argues that Harvard president A. Lawrence Lowell used extracurricular achievements and unquantifiable character assessments, which typically favored students at upper-class private schools like Groton, to limit the number of Jewish students at Harvard while still maintaining the illusion of merit-based admissions.

In The Big Test (1999), Nicholas Lemann agrees that Peabody prioritized leadership and character over "intellectual brilliance and artistic creativity," but primarily traces Peabody's influence through his students Henry Chauncey (the Harvard dean who popularized the use of standardized testing in college admissions) and to a lesser extent Henry Murray (the Harvard professor who created the Thematic Apperception Test). In his telling, Chauncey (a former scholarship student at Groton) wanted to use scientific tests of intellectual capacity to find talented "diamond in the rough" students who had not had the benefit of a Groton education, but also hoped to complement the Scholastic Aptitude Test with other tests that could quantify virtues that Peabody prized, such as persistence and judgment.

=== Assessment at Groton ===
At Groton, Peabody was a respected but divisive figure. He tried to treat his students like family, but his emphasis on social conformity alienated many students who did not fit into the mold of a "Groton boy." He encouraged some of the latter students to withdraw from the school, although Dean Acheson's mother flatly rejected the idea, replying that "I didn't send Dean here to have you make a 'Groton boy' out of him. I sent him here to be educated." Several of his nonconformist students, like Acheson, Sumner Welles, and Robert McCormick (who did in fact leave Groton), nonetheless went on to distinguished careers.

Franklin Roosevelt said of Peabody, "As long as I live his influence will mean more to me than that of any other people next to my father and mother"; he invited him to officiate at his wedding and to preach at his inauguration. In Roosevelt's fourth inaugural address, delivered two months after Peabody's death, he quoted Peabody's dictum that "the trend of civilization is forever upward." (Ironically, Peabody had voted for Herbert Hoover in the 1932 election; however, he also publicly defended Roosevelt when Groton alumni criticized the New Deal's progressive policies.) Newbold Morris said that the two Americans he admired most were Peabody and Fiorello La Guardia.

On the other hand, Louis Auchincloss harbored a lifelong ambivalence for Peabody, writing that "[t]o my young eyes, and I imagine to most, he seemed to bestride the world like a colossus, but in retrospect I see him more as a David engaged in the seemingly hopeless struggle of preserving some degree of spirituality from the Goliath of materialism that re-invaded the school with each new form of prosperous youngsters." A thirteen-year-old Averell Harriman said, “You know he would be an awful bully if he wasn’t such a terrible Christian”; later in life, he told Arthur Schlesinger that "the only recipe for success is to be unhappy at Groton." Robert McCormick bitterly resented Peabody and his prize classmate Franklin Roosevelt; near the end of his life his Chicago Tribune was still running headlines like "Blame Groton for Pro-British Attitude in U.S." Oliver La Farge wrote—in 1945, a quarter-century after graduating—that he still had nightmares of Peabody's Groton.
