= 1894 Nebraska lieutenant gubernatorial election =

- November 6, 1894
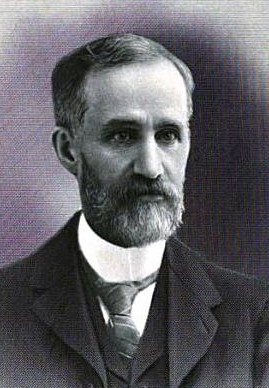

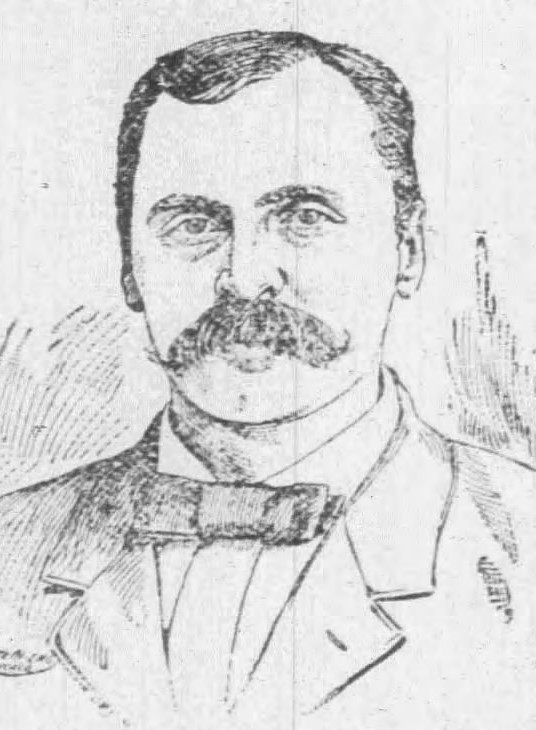

Nominee	Robert E. Moore	James N. Gaffin	Rodney E. Dunphy
Party	Republican	Populist	Democratic
Alliance		Democratic
Popular vote	97,298	85,393	13,785
Percentage	48.3%	42.3%	6.8%
Lieutenant Governor before election
Thomas J. Majors
Republican
Elected Lieutenant Governor
Robert E. Moore
Republican

The 1894 Nebraska lieutenant gubernatorial election was held on November 6, 1894, and featured Republican nominee Robert E. Moore defeating Populist and Democratic fusion nominee James N. Gaffin as well as Straight Democratic (anti-Populist) nominee Rodney E. Dunphy and Prohibition Party nominee Belle G. Bigelow.

Incumbent Nebraska Lieutenant Governor Thomas J. Majors did not run for reelection as lieutenant governor since he decided to seek the office of governor of Nebraska. Although Silas A. Holcomb, the Populist and Democratic fusion nominee, won the gubernatorial election over Majors, the Republicans continued to hold the office of lieutenant governor with the victory of Robert E. Moore over James N. Gaffin.

== General election ==
=== Candidates ===
- Belle G. Bigelow, Prohibition candidate, woman suffragist, president of the Lincoln Women's Christian Temperance Union, one of the first women to run for statewide office in Nebraska, and wife of George E. Bigelow, Prohibition candidate for governor of Nebraska in 1888, from Lincoln, Nebraska
- Rodney E. Dunphy, Straight Democratic (anti-Populist) candidate nominated by a breakaway faction from the Populist/Democratic fusion convention which also nominated Phelps D. Sturdevant for governor. Dunphy was a former member of the Nebraska Senate from 1883 to 1885 from Seward, Nebraska
- James N. Gaffin, Populist/Democratic Fusion candidate, farmer, president of the Farmers' Stock and Elevator Company, and member of the Nebraska House of Representatives since 1891 and Speaker of the Nebraska House of Representatives since 1893 from Colon, Nebraska. Gaffin was originally nominated for governor of Nebraska but lost to Silas A. Holcomb at the Populist convention and thus was subsequently nominated for lieutenant governor.
- Robert E. Moore, Republican candidate, member of the Nebraska Senate since 1891 and previously from 1887 to 1889 from Lincoln, Nebraska, and former mayor of Lincoln from 1883 to 1885

=== Results ===
Nebraska lieutenant gubernatorial election, 1894
Party	Candidate	Votes	%
Republican	Robert E. Moore	97,298	48.25
Populist	James N. Gaffin	85,393	42.34
Democratic	Rodney E. Dunphy	13,785	6.84
Prohibition	Belle G. Bigelow	5,188	2.57
Total votes		201,664	100.00
Republican hold			

== See also ==
- 1894 Nebraska gubernatorial election
