= Samuel Endicott Peabody =

American merchant and banker (1825–1909)

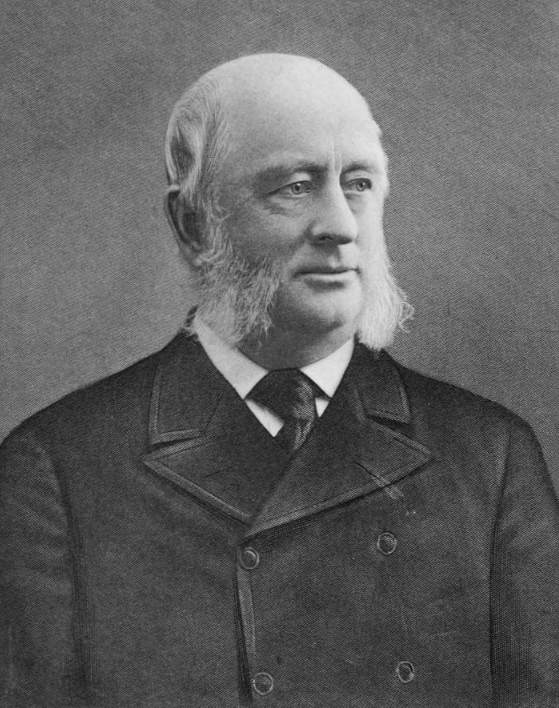
- Born: April 19, 1825; Salem, Massachusetts
- Died: October 31, 1909 (aged 84); Salem, Massachusetts
- Education: Harvard College
- Employer: J.S. Morgan & Co.
- Spouse: Marianne Cabot Lee (m. 1848)
- Children: 5, including Endicott and Francis
- Relatives: Malcolm E. Peabody (grandson)

Signature
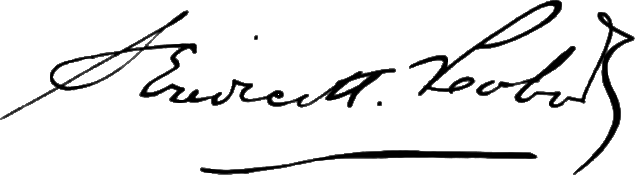

Samuel Endicott Peabody (April 19, 1825 – October 31, 1909) was an American merchant and banker who was a partner in the London banking firm of J.S. Morgan & Co.

== Early life ==
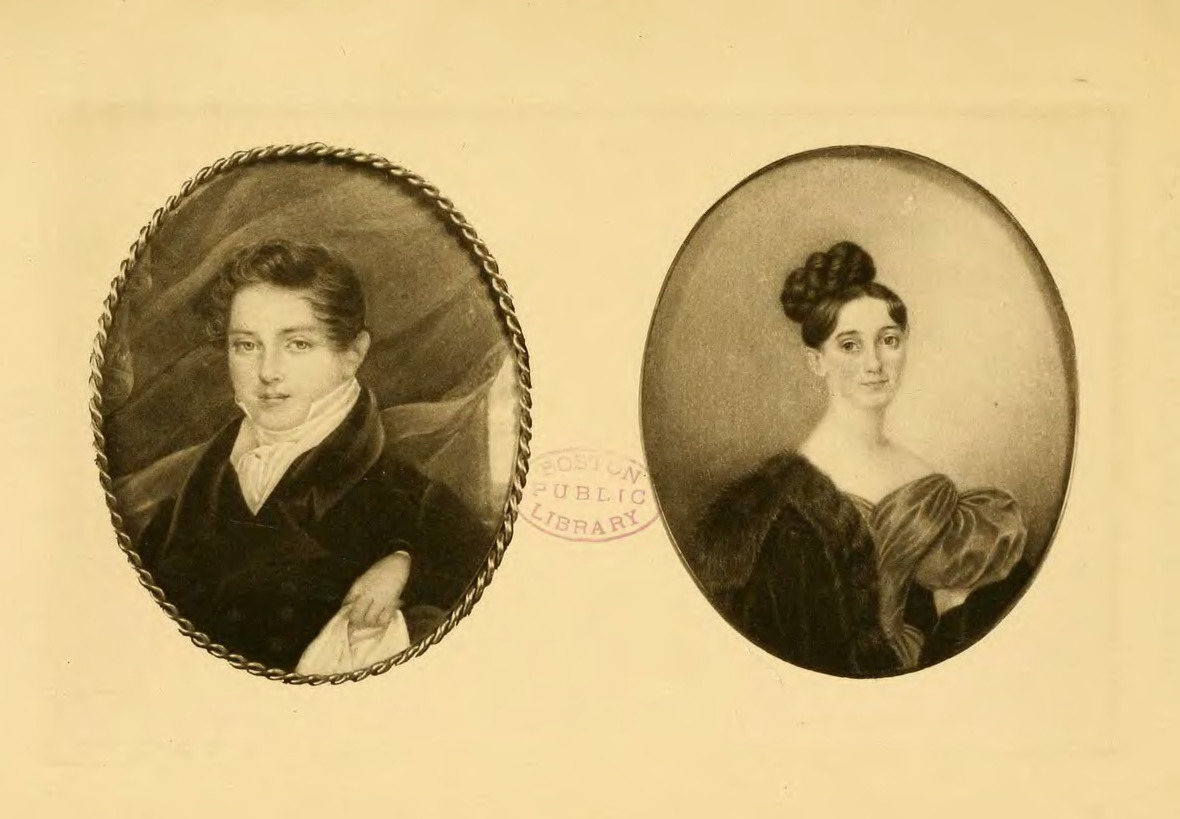
Portrait of his parents, Francis and Martha Peabody

Peabody was born on April 19, 1825, in Salem, Massachusetts. He was a son of Col. Francis Peabody (1801–1867) and Martha (née Endicott) Peabody (1799–1891).

His paternal grandparents were Joseph Peabody and Elizabeth (née Smith) Peabody (a daughter of the Rev. Elias Smith and sister of Rev. Elias Smith). Through his mother, he was a direct descendant of Gov. John Endicott of the Massachusetts Bay Colony. His maternal grandparents were Samuel Endicott and Elizabeth (née Putnam) Endicott.

Peabody spent one year studying at Harvard College before becoming a merchant.

== Career ==
After Harvard, he organized the merchant firm of Curtis & Peabody, with offices on India Wharf. He also served as president of the Salem National Bank and was a director of many companies.

In 1875, Peabody was invited to become a partner in the London banking firm of J.S. Morgan & Co. that had been founded as George Peabody & Co. by a distant relative, George Peabody. He was responsible for helping to introduce American securities to British investors. During his first year as a partner, the firm "scored one of its greatest successes by the placing of the French loan. The Franco-Prussian War had just ended, France had been defeated, and the Rothschilds, the Barings and other firms, apprehensive of her future, refused to identify themselves with it. Events, however, sustained the braver, better judgment of Mr. Morgan and his partners. The loan was subscribed three or four times over, and the speedy recuperation of the republics helped to give its fiscal agent a reputation and standing which, with J. Pierpont Morgan as chief partner, the house conspicuously maintain[ed]."

Peabody lived in London from 1875 until his retirement in 1901, mostly at 97 Queen's Gate in South Kensington. Upon his return to America, he was elected a director of the American Loan and Trust Company.

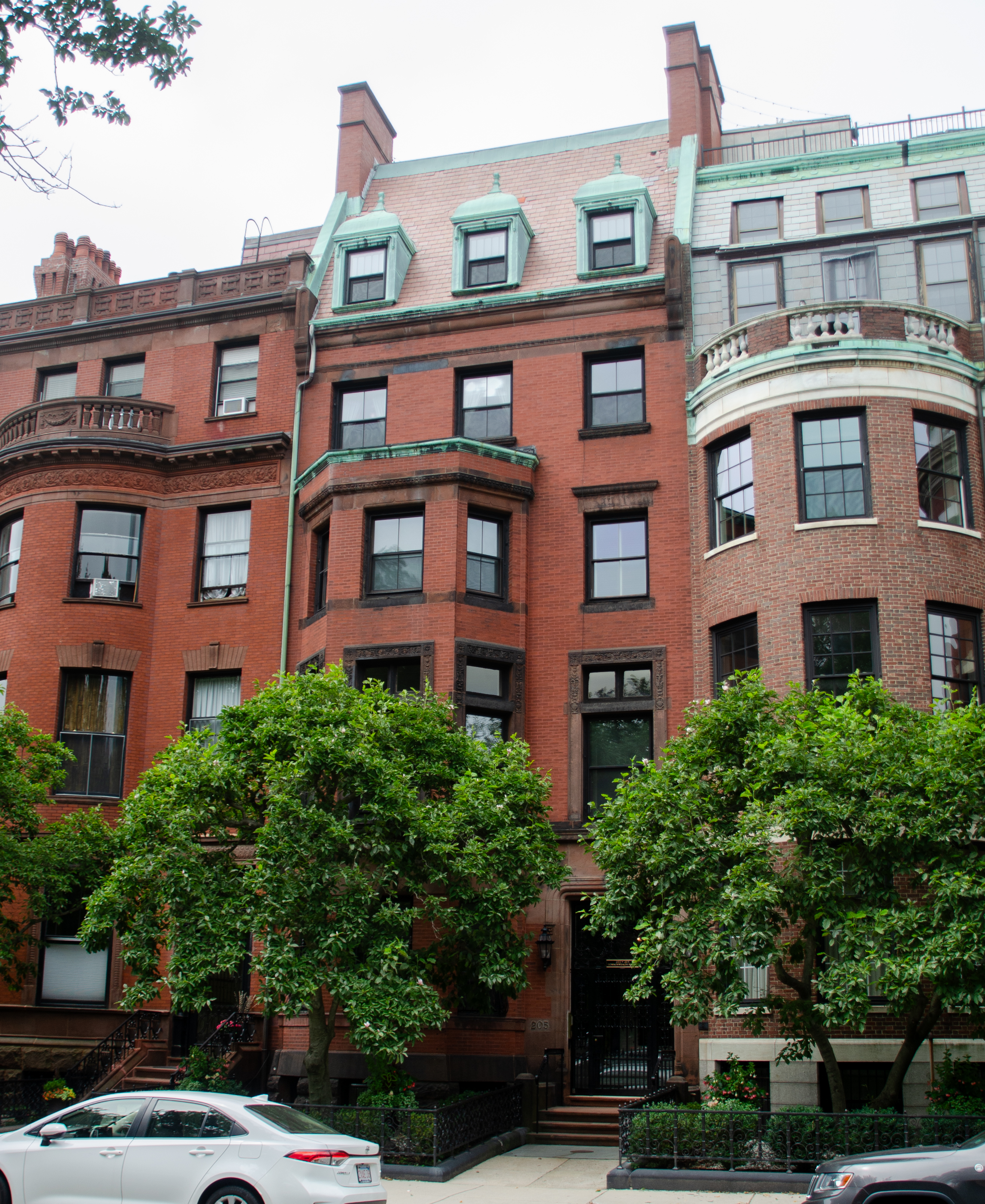
Peabody's Back Bay residence, designed by Peabody & Stearns

== Personal life ==
On November 23, 1848, Peabody was married to Marianne Cabot Lee (1828–1911), a daughter of John Clarke Lee and Harriet Paine (née Rose) Lee. Together, they were the parents of five children:

- John Endicott Peabody (1853–1921), who married Gertrude Lawrence, a daughter of James Lawrence. After her death in 1883, he married Martha Prince Whitney.
- Francis Peabody (1854–1938), a lawyer who married Rosamund Lawrence, a daughter of Abbott Bigelow Lawrence Jr.
- Endicott Peabody (1857–1944), who married Frances Peabody, a daughter of Francis Peabody.
- Martha Endicott Peabody (1863–1935), who married John Lawrence, son of Abbott Bigelow Lawrence Jr.
- George Lee Peabody (1865–1911), who married Elizabeth Copley Crowinshield, a daughter of Col. Caspar Crowninshield.

Peabody died at Kernwood, his home in Salem, on October 31, 1909. His estate was valued at $1,000,000. His widow died in Salem in October 1911.

=== Descendants ===
Through his son Endicott, he was a grandfather of The Right Reverend Malcolm E. Peabody, Bishop of Central New York, and great-grandfather of Marietta Peabody Tree and Endicott Peabody, the 62nd Governor of Massachusetts.
