= 1888 Nebraska gubernatorial election =

- November 6, 1888
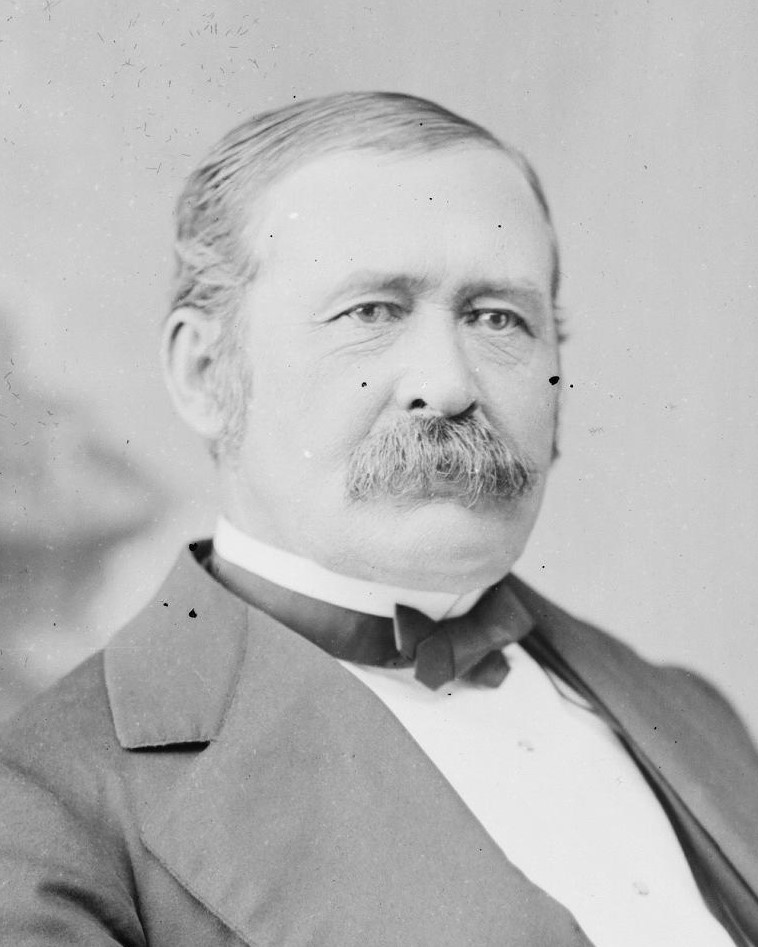

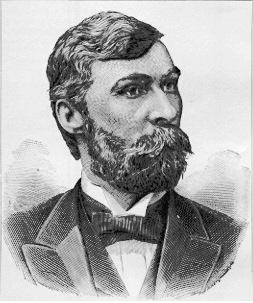
Nominee	John Milton Thayer	John A. McShane
Party	Republican	Democratic
Popular vote	103,983	85,420
Percentage	51.26%	42.11%
- County results Thayer: 40–50% 50–60% 60–70% 70–80% McShane: 40–50% 50–60% 60–70% No Data/Votes
Governor before election
John Milton Thayer
Republican
Elected Governor
John Milton Thayer
Republican

The 1888 Nebraska gubernatorial election was held on November 6, 1888, and featured incumbent Governor John Milton Thayer, a Republican, defeating Democratic nominee John A. McShane, Prohibition nominee George E. Bigelow, and the Union Labor nominee, former impeached Nebraska Governor David Butler, to win a second two-year term in office.

== General election ==
=== Candidates ===
- George E. Bigelow, Prohibition candidate, husband of Belle G. Bigelow
- David Butler, Union Labor candidate, first Governor of Nebraska from 1867 until he was impeached in 1871
- John A. McShane, Democratic candidate, member of the United States House of Representatives from Nebraska's 1st congressional district
- John Milton Thayer, Republican candidate, incumbent Governor of Nebraska

=== Results ===
Nebraska gubernatorial election, 1888
Party	Candidate	Votes	%
Republican	John Milton Thayer (incumbent)	103,983	51.26%
Democratic	John A. McShane	85,420	42.11%
Prohibition	George E. Bigelow	9,511	4.69%
Labor	David Butler	3,941	1.94%
Total votes		202,855	100.0%
Republican hold			

== See also ==
- 1888 Nebraska lieutenant gubernatorial election
