= Francis Peabody Jr. =

American lawyer

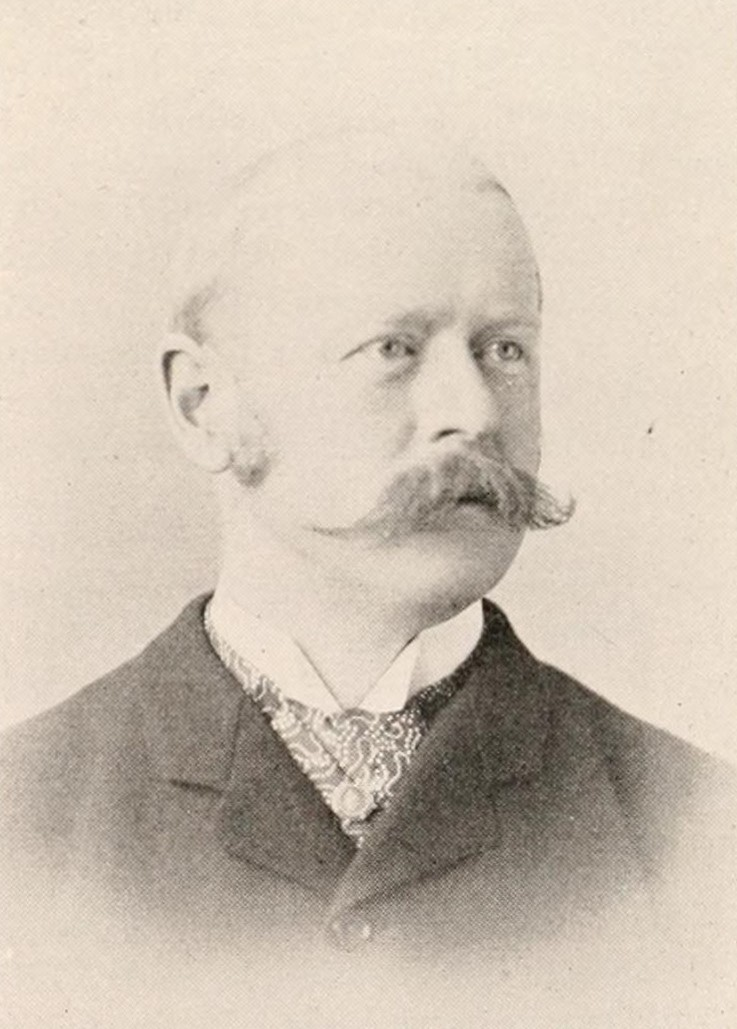
- Born: September 1, 1854; Salem, Massachusetts, U.S.
- Died: February 9, 1938 (aged 83); Milton, Massachusetts, U.S.
- Education: Cheltenham College; Trinity College, Cambridge; Lincoln's Inn
- Occupations: Lawyer; sportsman; businessman; politician
- Spouse: Rosamond Lawrence (m. 1881)
- Father: Samuel Endicott Peabody
- Relatives: Endicott Peabody (brother)

Francis Peabody Jr. (September 1, 1854 – February 9, 1938) was an American lawyer, sportsman, businessman and political figure.

== Early life ==
Peabody was a member of the Peabody family, which had resided in Essex County, Massachusetts, since 1635. Peabody was born in Salem, Massachusetts, on September 1, 1854. He was one of five children born to Samuel Endicott Peabody and Marianne Cabot (Lee) Peabody. His siblings were artist John Endicott Peabody, Rev. Endicott Peabody, banker George Peabody, and Martha Endicott (Peabody) Lawrence. Peabody was named after his uncle, a common practice in New England. The elder Francis Peabody was president of the American Insurance Company.

Peabody was educated at private schools in Salem. When he was 16 years old, Peabody's father became a partner with J. S. Morgan & Co., which resulted in the family moving to England. Peabody attended Cheltenham College and graduated from Trinity College, Cambridge in 1873. After studying law at Lincoln's Inn, Peabody was admitted to the bar at Middle Temple in 1877. While in England, Peabody also had a distinguished rowing career, winning 50 cups.

== Sports ==
Peabody participated in 120 boat races. He rowed for Cheltenham, was the captain of Trinity's first crew, was one of the few Americans to row for the Leander Club, and was on the Harvard crew that won the 1879 Harvard–Yale Regatta.

In 1888, Peabody became coach of the Harvard varsity crew. In 1896, he turned over control of the team to R. C. Lehmann, a noted English rowing coach that Peabody knew from his time in the country.

Peabody was a founder of The Country Club, Myopia Hunt Club, Nahant Club, and Norfolk Hunt Club. He was president of the Norfolk Hunt Club for 25 years. Peabody purchased the Forbes stock farm in Canton, Massachusetts, and bred thoroughbred Show hunters.

== Legal career ==
Peabody returned to the United States in 1878. He spent a year with the law firm of Morse, Stone & Greenough then spent a year at Harvard Law School. In 1879, Peabody was admitted to the bar and started practicing with John Lawrence. Peabody and Lawrence focused on Administration. The pair administered the trust of Lawrence's father, Abbott Lawrence, as well as the fund left by noted philanthropist George Peabody.

In 1897, Peabody represented two heirs of Francois Etienne Derieux, a French citizen whose estate was managed by the Turkish consul general in Boston, Joseph A. Iasigi. Peabody's insistence led to the Suffolk County District Attorney's office prosecuting Iasigi, who was charged with embezzling about $220,000. Iasigi was found guilty and spent 11 ½ years in prison before receiving a pardon from Eben Sumner Draper.

In 1900, Peabody formed a law firm with Edmund K. Arnold. In 1909 the firm became Peabody, Arnold, Batchelder, & Luther.

== Personal life ==
In 1881, Peabody married John Lawrence's sister, Rosamond Lawrence, with whom he had three daughters, Rosamund, Martha, and Sylvia. The family lived at 891 Commonwealth Avenue in Boston and summered in Nahant, Massachusetts. John Lawrence married Peabody's sister, Martha. In 1896, the Peabodys left Boston for Milton, Massachusetts, when he purchased an estate belonging to L. A. Roberts. The house was three years old, but the Peabody's were its first occupants as Roberts chose not to move in following the death of his wife.

== Politics ==
In 1891, Peabody joined Governor William E. Russell's staff as an aide-de-camp. He was later promoted to the position of judge advocate general.

In early November 1894, Boston Democrats began working to secure their party's nomination for mayor for Peabody. On November 9, 1894, Peabody stated that "in no sense am I seeking [the Democratic nomination], for I have no desire to relinquish my law business”. At the city convention on November 16, Peabody's name was put in nomination by Senator-elect Joseph J. Corbett, who gave an eloquent speech in favor of Peabody. His nomination was seconded by Robert Treat Paine Jr. Peabody was chosen over the only other candidate, Congressman Joseph H. O'Neil, 180 votes to 77 votes. On November 28, Peabody accepted the nomination. Peabody lost the 1894 Boston mayoral election to Republican Edwin Upton Curtis by about 2,500 votes.

In 1896, Peabody broke with the Democratic Party and voted for Republican presidential candidate William McKinley. He did not return to Democratic politics until 1928, when he became chairman of the Massachusetts Lawyers for Smith Committee. Peabody backed Al Smith over Herbert Hoover due to Smith's opposition to Prohibition. He also supported the Democrats' 1932 presidential nominee, Franklin D. Roosevelt.

== Business ==
Peabody was very involved in real estate and spent several years as the president of the Boston Real Estate exchange. He also served as president of the Nashua Manufacturing Company, vice president of the Massachusetts Hospital Life Insurance Company, a member of the executive committee of the State Street Trust Company, and director of the National Union Bank, American Trust Company, and the American Red Cross.

== Death ==
Peabody died on February 9, 1938, at his home in Milton. He was survived by his three daughters, six grandchildren, and one great-grandchild. He was predeceased by his wife, who died on June 8, 1935.
