= St. Paul's Episcopal Church (Tombstone, Arizona) =

NRHP church in Cochise County, Arizona

- U.S. National Register of Historic Places
- U.S. Historic district – Contributing property
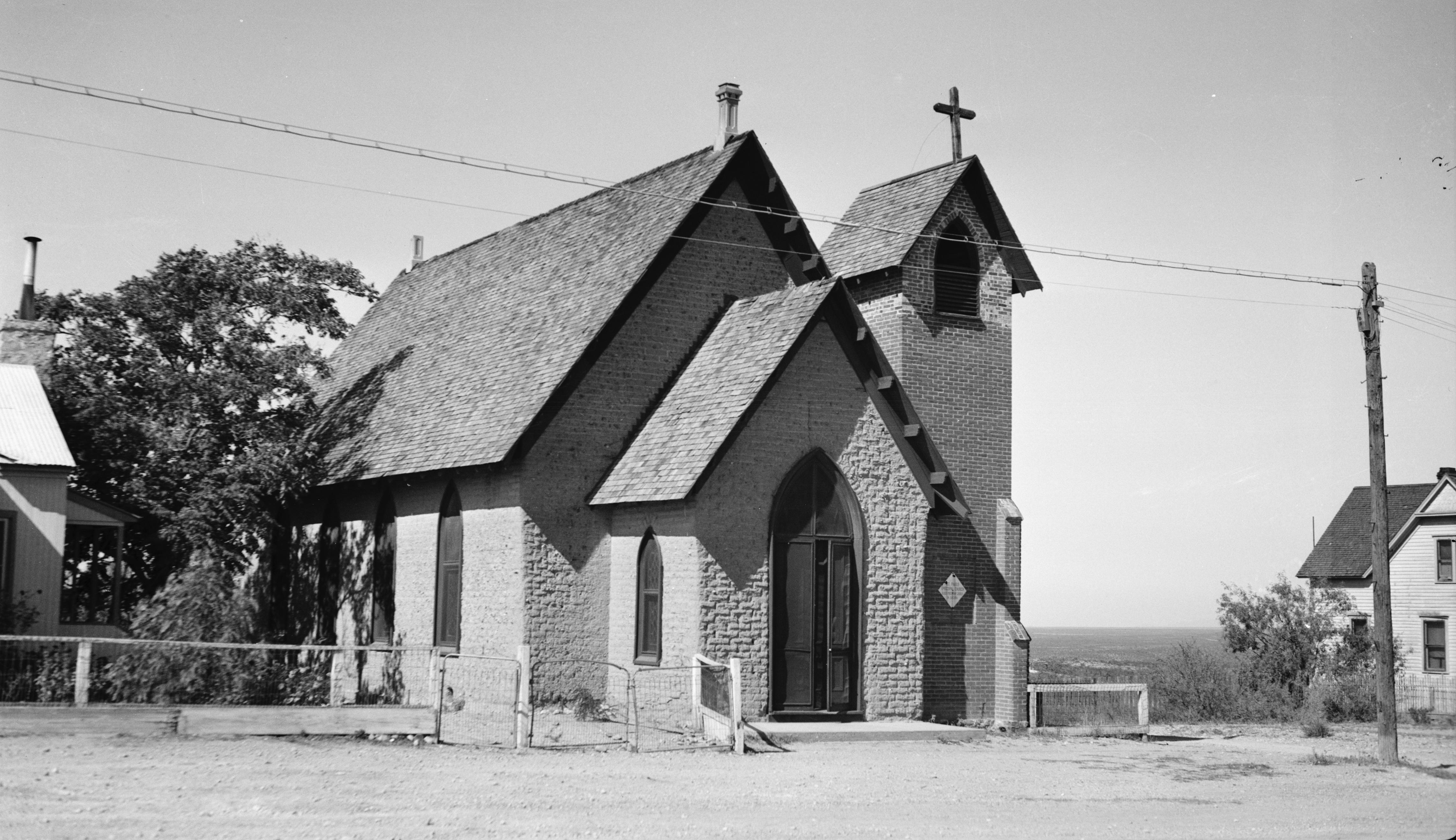

- Location within Arizona Location within the United States
- Location: Safford and 3rd Sts., Tombstone, Arizona
- Coordinates: 31°42′54″N 110°04′04″W
- Area: 0.5 acres (0.20 ha)
- Built: 1882
- Architectural style: Gothic Revival
- Part of: Tombstone Historic District (ID66000171)
- NRHP reference No.: 71000111

Significant dates
- Added to NRHP: September 22, 1971
- Designated CP: October 15, 1966

St. Paul's Episcopal Church is a historic Episcopal church at Safford and 3rd Streets in Tombstone, Arizona, United States. Built in 1882, it is the oldest Protestant church in Arizona. It is part of the Episcopal Diocese of Arizona.

In 2016, the church reported 25 members; in 2023, it reported 39 members. No membership statistics were reported in 2024 national parochial reports. Plate and pledge financial support reported by the church in 2024 was $20,000. Average Sunday Attendance (ASA) reported in 2019 was 28 persons.

== History ==
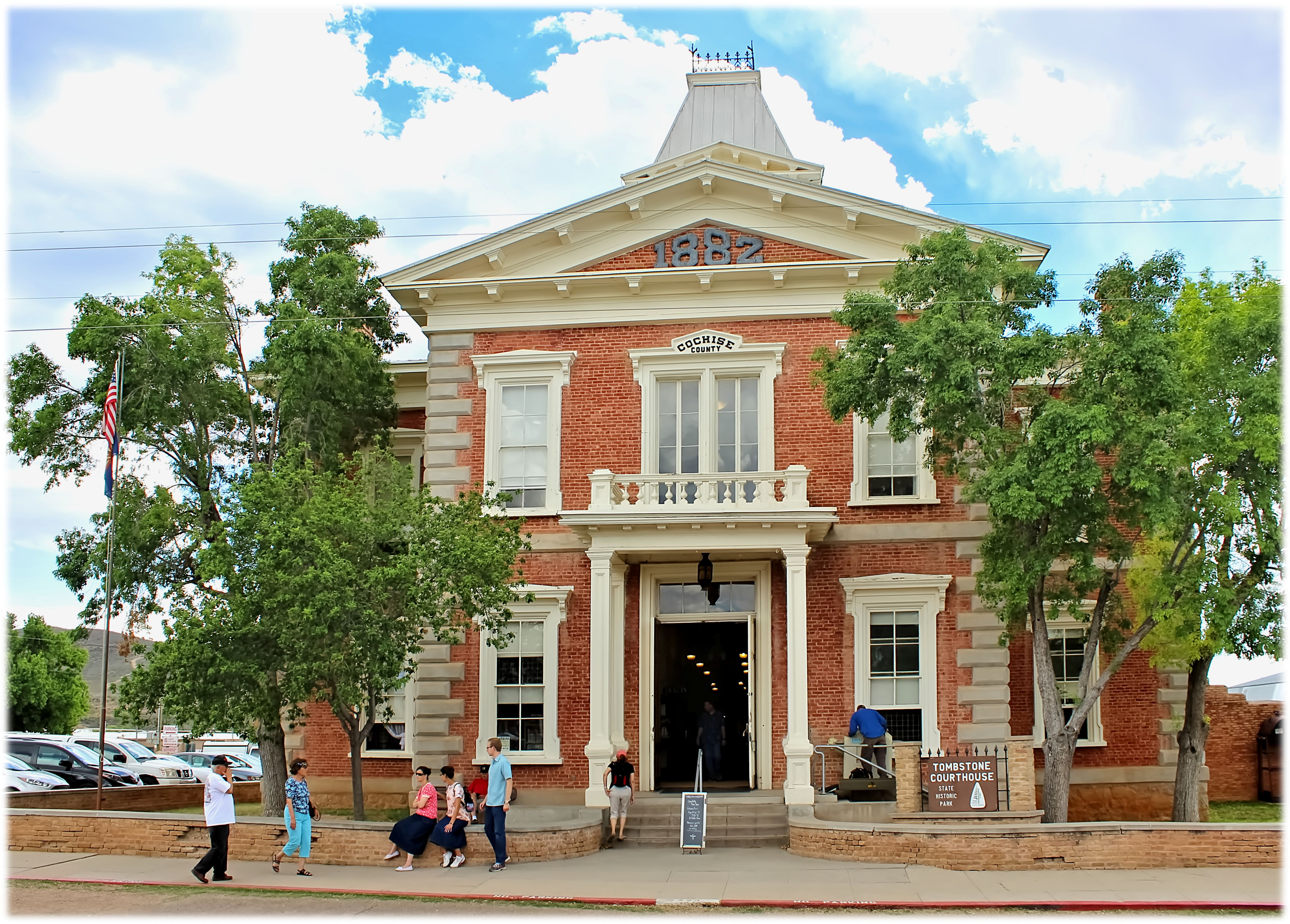
The Episcopal community of Tombstone held services in the Cochise County Courthouse until St. Paul's opened.

Around 1882, the Episcopal Diocese of Arizona-New Mexico began plans for a new church building in the boomtown of Tombstone, Arizona. Tombstone was the center of the Arizona silver mining industry and, "for a brief moment, the biggest, richest, gaudiest, hottest, meanest, [and] most notorious town in Arizona Territory". A Reverend Talbot was initially assigned to oversee construction, but he left after two or three months and was replaced by Episcopal seminarian Endicott Peabody in January 1882.

The people of Tombstone had already subscribed $1,000 to build a church, but $5,000 was required. Peabody set about raising funds, recruiting the family of Wyatt Earp to donate the altar rail. Although the town suffered a major fire in May 1882 that "destroy[ed] most of the central business district", Peabody was able to open the church on June 18, 1882. The following month, he returned to Massachusetts to resume his studies at Episcopal Theological School, and eventually became a schoolmaster. In 2007, he was added to the liturgical calendar of the Episcopal Diocese of Arizona.

St. Paul's is the oldest Protestant church building in Arizona. (The Catholic Sacred Heart Church was built in 1881.) Tombstone eventually hosted four churches: Episcopal, Catholic, Presbyterian, and Methodist. However, by 1884, silver prices were falling, and by 1886, the mines were flooded, prompting two-thirds of the population to leave town.

St. Paul's continues to serve a small Episcopal congregation today. In 2017, the Diocese of Arizona agreed to fund "additional publicity advertising and administrative activities" to help the church remain in its original location.

== Architecture and preservation ==
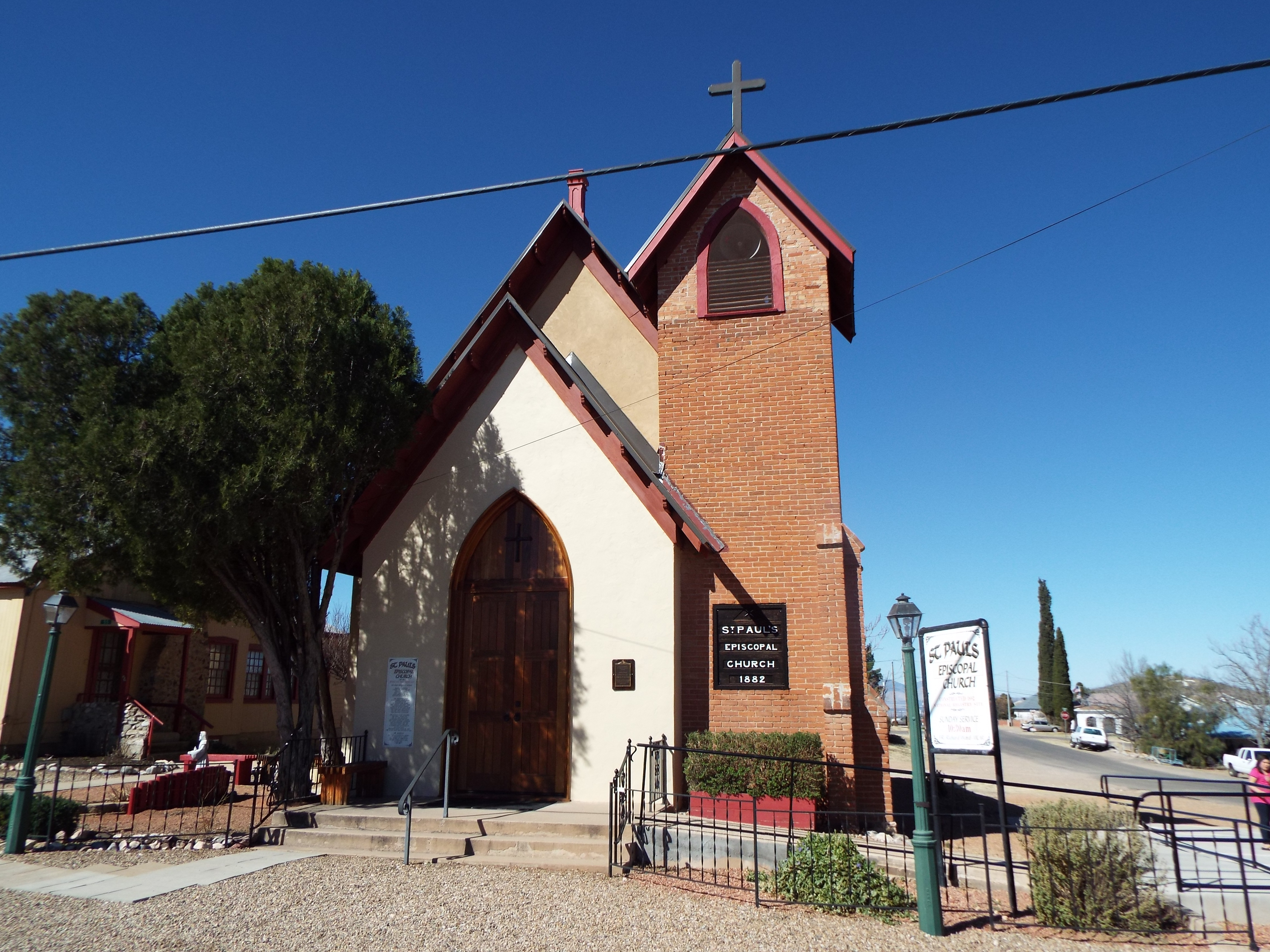
St. Paul's in 2016

St. Paul's was built in the Gothic Revival style, with adobe brick and a wood truss roof. Stained-glass windows were imported from Belgium. The church was relatively small in plan at 25 by 70 feet (7.6 m × 21.3 m). The church claims that it is "the only Gothic Revival adobe church in the world".

Two years after the church opened, the old adobe bell tower was destroyed by lightning. It was replaced with a brick tower in 1887. In 1928, a rectory was added to the site. In 1970, a covering of stucco was added to protect the adobe brick. As of 1971, little had been changed since 1882, except for the bell tower. As of 2010, the church was still using the original pews, altar rail, and light fixtures.

In the 2010s, the church restored its stained-glass windows, replaced the roof, and commissioned a new set of front doors. In addition, in 2022, the church started a fundraising campaign to renovate the bell tower, the cost of which was estimated at $56,000.

In June 1971, the building was added to the National Register of Historic Places. It is also part of the Tombstone Historic District, which was designated a National Historic Landmark in 1961 and classified as a historic district in 1979.

== See also ==
- National Register of Historic Places listings in Cochise County, Arizona
