= 1888 Nebraska lieutenant gubernatorial election =

- November 6, 1888
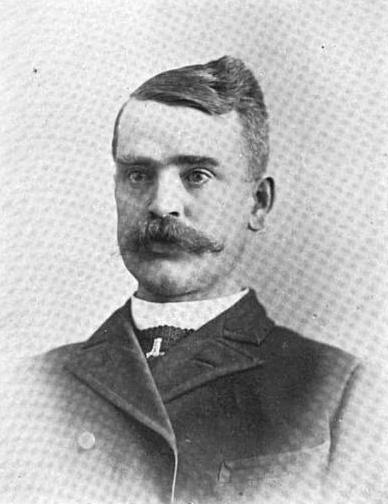

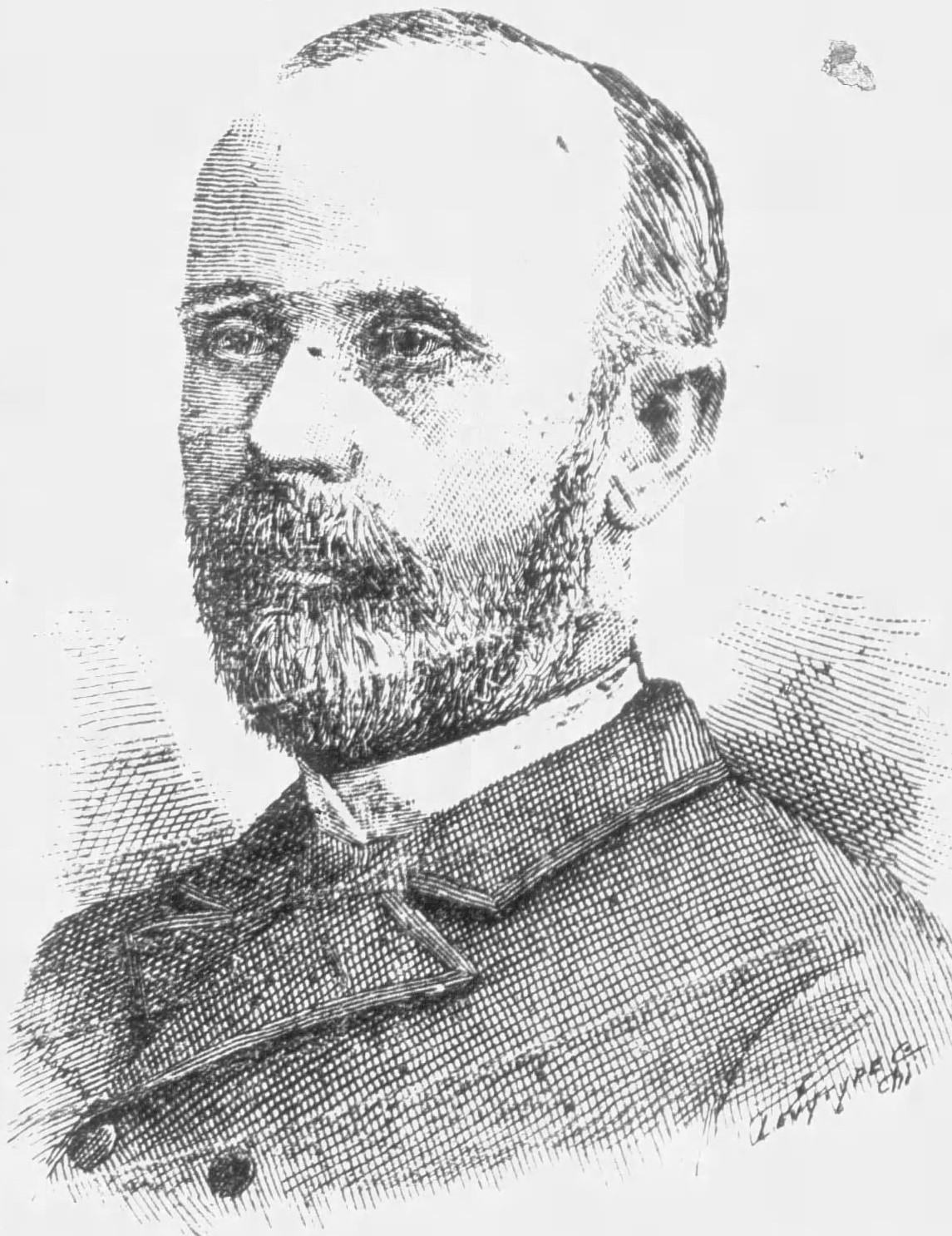
Nominee	George de Rue Meiklejohn	Frank Folda	John Dale
Party	Republican	Democratic	Prohibition
Popular vote	103,460	79,706	9,885
Percentage	52.4%	40.4%	5.0%
Lieutenant Governor before election
Hibbard H. Shedd
Republican
Elected Lieutenant Governor
George de Rue Meiklejohn
Republican

The 1888 Nebraska lieutenant gubernatorial election was held on November 6, 1888, and featured Republican nominee George de Rue Meiklejohn defeating Democratic nominee Frank Folda as well as Prohibition Party nominee John Dale and Union Labor nominee C. W. Potter.

== General election ==
=== Candidates ===
- John Dale, Prohibition candidate, businessman and president of the Metropolitan Prohibition Club of Omaha, Nebraska. Dale was originally nominated at the Prohibition Party convention for governor, but lost to George E. Bigelow in a 503 to 307 vote. He was then nominated to run for lieutenant governor over C. F. S. Templin.
- Frank Folda, Democratic candidate, banker and former member of the Nebraska House of Representatives from 1875 to 1877 from Schuyler, Nebraska
- George de Rue Meiklejohn, Republican candidate, lawyer, former county attorney for Nance County, member of the Nebraska Senate since 1885 and president pro tempore of the Nebraska Senate since 1887 from Fullerton, Nebraska
- C. W. Potter, Union Labor candidate, member of the executive committee of the State Farmers' Alliance from Brown County, Nebraska

=== Results ===
Nebraska lieutenant gubernatorial election, 1888
Party	Candidate	Votes	%
Republican	George de Rue Meiklejohn	103,460	52.41
Democratic	Frank Folda	79,706	40.37
Prohibition	John Dale	9,885	5.01
Labor	C. W. Potter	4,361	2.21
Scattering		10	
Total votes		197,422	100.00
Republican hold			

== See also ==
- 1888 Nebraska gubernatorial election
