= George Lemuel Woods =

American lawyer and politician (1832–1890)

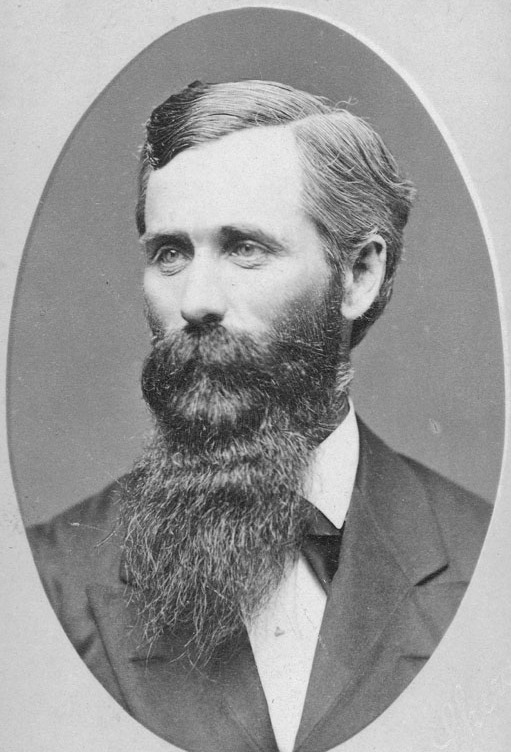

9th Governor of Utah Territory
- In office February 2, 1871 – February 2, 1875
- Appointed by: Ulysses S. Grant
- Preceded by: Vernon H. Vaughan
- Succeeded by: Samuel Beach Axtell

3rd Governor of Oregon
- In office September 12, 1866 – September 14, 1870
- Preceded by: A. C. Gibbs
- Succeeded by: La Fayette Grover

Personal details
- Born: July 30, 1832 Boone County, Missouri, US
- Died: January 7, 1890 (aged 57) Portland, Oregon, US
- Party: National Union / Republican
- Spouse: Louisa A. McBride (m. 1852)
- Children: 2
- Profession: Lawyer

George Lemuel Woods (July 30, 1832 – January 7, 1890) was an American lawyer, judge, and politician. A member of the Republican Party, Woods served as the third governor of Oregon from 1866 to 1870. Failing to win renomination, Woods was then appointed Territorial Governor of Utah by President Ulysses S. Grant, serving in that position from 1871 to 1875.

== Biography ==
=== Early years ===
George Lemuel Woods was born July 30, 1832, in Boone County, Missouri, the second of four boys born to Caleb Woods and Margaret McBride. His ancestors came to North America from Scotland in the late 17th Century, settling first in Virginia before moving to the Kentucky frontier. His father had moved to Missouri in 1808.

In 1847, when George was just 15, his parents moved to the Oregon Territory. In Oregon, the family settled in Yamhill County, George was educated in the public schools.

In April 1852, Woods was married to Louisa A. McBride. The couple had two sons. The young couple took a homestead on unimproved government land, which Woods cleared, fenced, and plowed.

Unsatisfied with rural life, in 1856 Woods sold his property and enrolled at McMinnville College, where he studied law. Working as a carpenter during the day and studying at night, Woods purchased a small law library and was eventually admitted to the bar in 1858, setting up a private practice. Woods proved capable at the task and gained recognition as a proficient attorney.

=== Political career ===
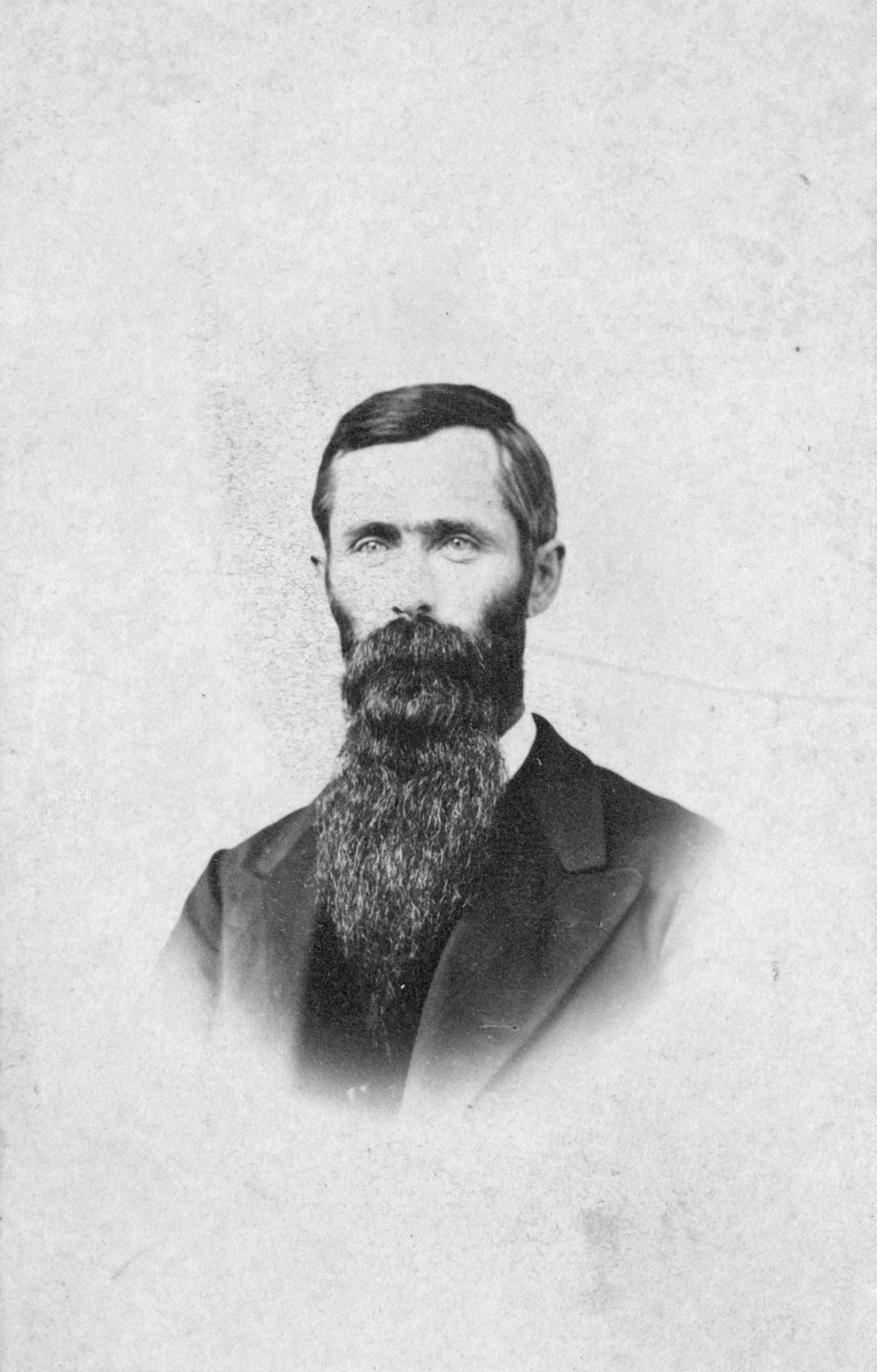
Carte de visite, undated

In 1857, Woods organized Republican clubs in the state and was a noted speaker of the party.

Woods was appointed a judge in Wasco County in 1863. He was nominated as a presidential elector in March 1864 and was active in the campaign to re-elect Abraham Lincoln to the presidency, gaining a following as an eloquent and effective orator and stump speaker. Woods toured the state as leading representative of the National Union Party (Republican-Pro-War Democrat coalition), debating the anti-war Democrat Aaron E. Wait, Chief Justice of the Oregon Supreme Court.

In 1865 he was appointed to serve on the Idaho Territory’s Supreme Court, but before his formal commission arrived he was nominated for governor by the Union Party. Woods won election over his Democratic opponent, prominent attorney James L. Kelly, in a heated and intense campaign, becoming the third Governor of the state of Oregon. His term began on September 12, 1866, and continued until September 14, 1870.

An 1870 portrait of Woods by one who had heard him speak on numerous occasions characterized the "positive and magnetic" Governor as

"...tall, graceful, and commanding, with a handsome, cheerful face, which is set off by a full, flowing beard and manifesting the utmost mental activity.... His manner of speaking is rapid, but distinct and impressive, never using long or high-sounding words or indulging in any extravagance or impropriety or metaphor. He seems to depend on the natural forces of ideas rather than upon the sonorousness of words; and although never written, unless by some very swift reporter at the time of their delivery, his speeches would be considered well adapted to the most refined of lecture-rooms.... Perhaps no American orator is capable of a quicker or keener retort, but it is a cut from a rapier, rather than a stroke with a bludgeon."

Woods' prowess as a public speaker placed him in demand for other candidates around the country, and he made campaign speaking tours on behalf of Republican candidates in California in 1867 — where he made 30 speeches in 35 nights — and the New England states of New Hampshire and Connecticut in 1868.

Woods failed to win re-election but was immediately appointed by new Republican President Ulysses S. Grant as the Governor of Utah Territory in 1871. Woods proved to be a critic of Mormon leader Brigham Young, and was not reappointed in 1875 at the conclusion of his term. During his term as governor, a "lion's share" of the new Japanese government under Emperor Meiji stayed in Salt Lake City on their way from San Francisco to Washington, DC as part of the first Japanese embassy to the United States. Governor Woods gave a speech to the delegation extolling the virtues of American industry, with its ability to erect a city in a "howling wilderness."

== Later life ==
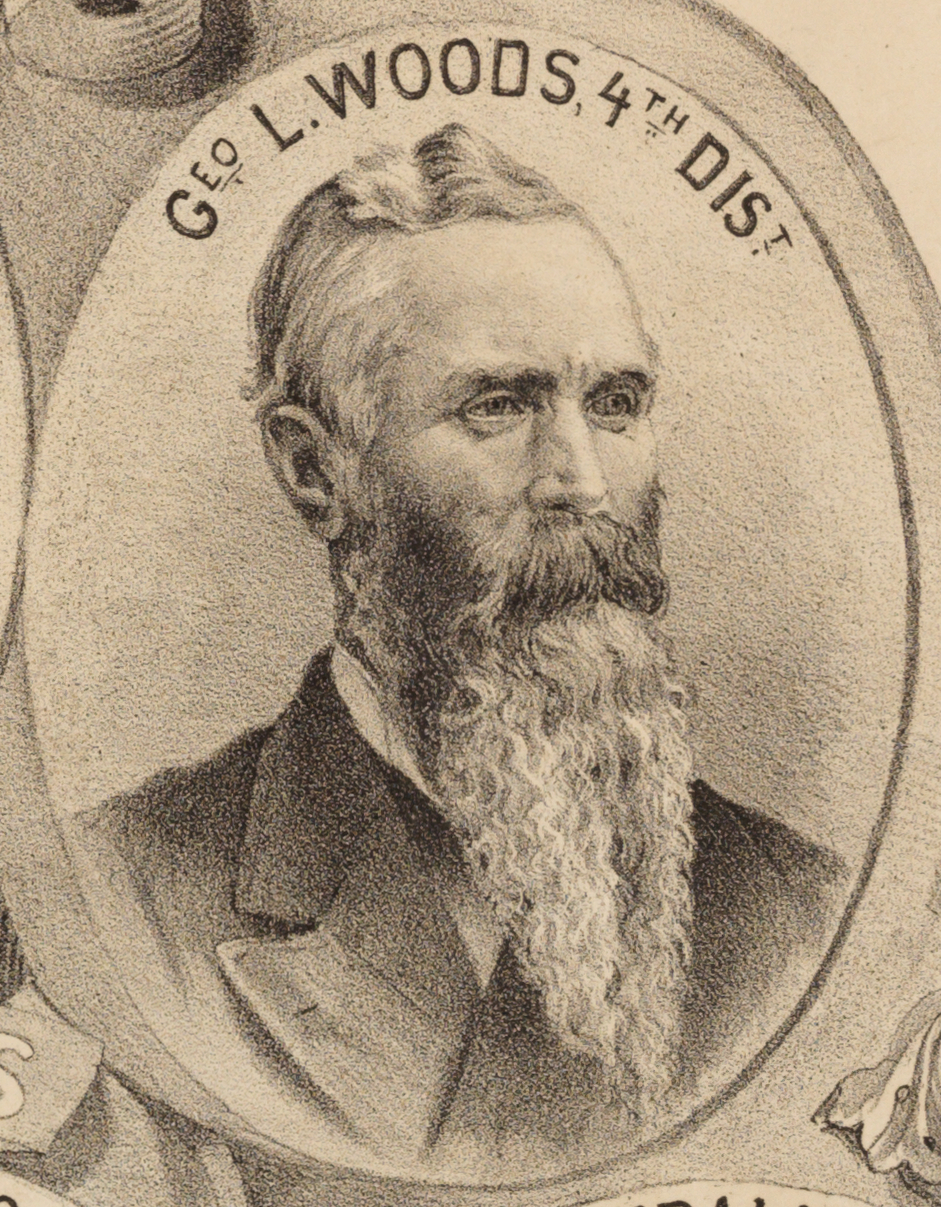
Engraving by Britton & Rey from a photograph by G. D. Morse, 1882

After leaving the Utah governorship Woods moved to California, where he remained for ten years. He then returned to Oregon in 1885, where he died on January 7, 1890. Woods was buried at River View Cemetery in Portland, Oregon.

== Footnotes ==
Party political offices
Preceded by A. C. Gibbs	Republican nominee for Governor of Oregon; 1866	Succeeded by J. C. Tolman
Political offices
Preceded by A. C. Gibbs	Governor of Oregon; 1866–1870	Succeeded by La Fayette Grover
Preceded by Vernon H. Vaughan	Governor of Utah Territory; 1871–1875	Succeeded by Samuel Beach Axtell
