= Vernon H. Vaughan =

8th Governor of Utah Territory

Vernon H Vaughan
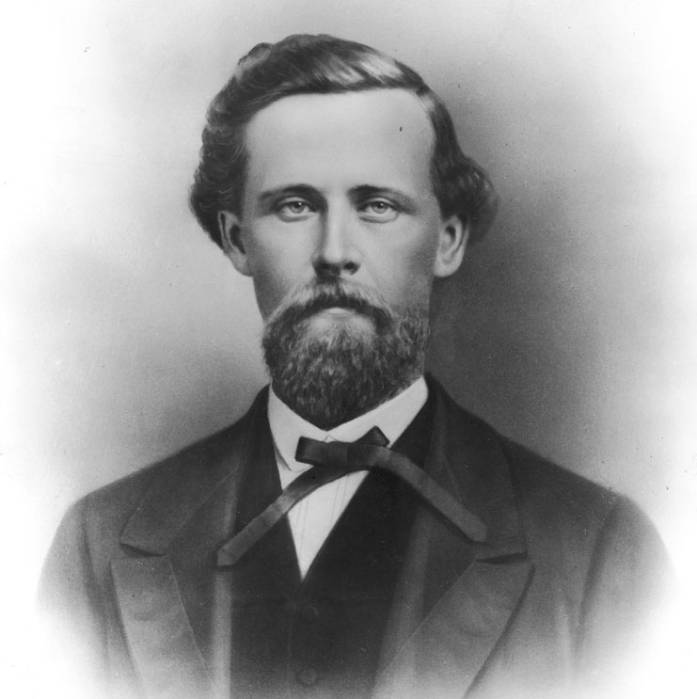

8th Governor of Utah Territory
- In office October 31, 1870 – February 1, 1871
- Appointed by: Ulysses S. Grant
- Preceded by: John Shaffer
- Succeeded by: George Lemuel Woods

Personal details
- Born: February 11, 1838 Mount Meigs, Alabama
- Died: December 4, 1878 (aged 40) Sacramento, California

Vernon H. Vaughan (February 11, 1838 – December 4, 1878) was an American political leader.

== Biography ==
Born in Mount Meigs, Alabama, he served as Utah territorial secretary to Governor John Shaffer, and after Shaffer's untimely death in office, President Ulysses S. Grant appointed Vaughan to fill the vacancy as acting governor. He served three uneventful months and was not reappointed. He died on December 4, 1878, in Sacramento, California.

Vaughan was a professor at the University of Alabama during the Reconstruction era.

=== Wooden Gun Rebellion ===
The only event of consequence during Vernon's administration, the Wooden Gun Rebellion, involved an illegal (according to John Shaffer's proclamation) drill by members of the Nauvoo Legion in November 1870; the accused were all arrested and tried, yet later all released.

== Notes ==
Political offices
Preceded by John Shaffer	Governor of Utah Territory; 1870–1871	Succeeded by George Lemuel Woods
