= 1894 Oregon gubernatorial election =

- June 4, 1894
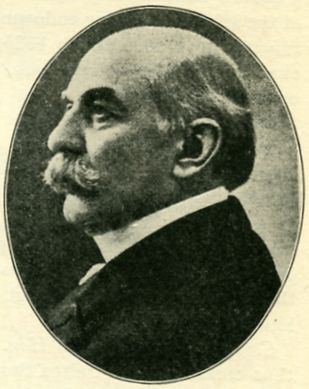

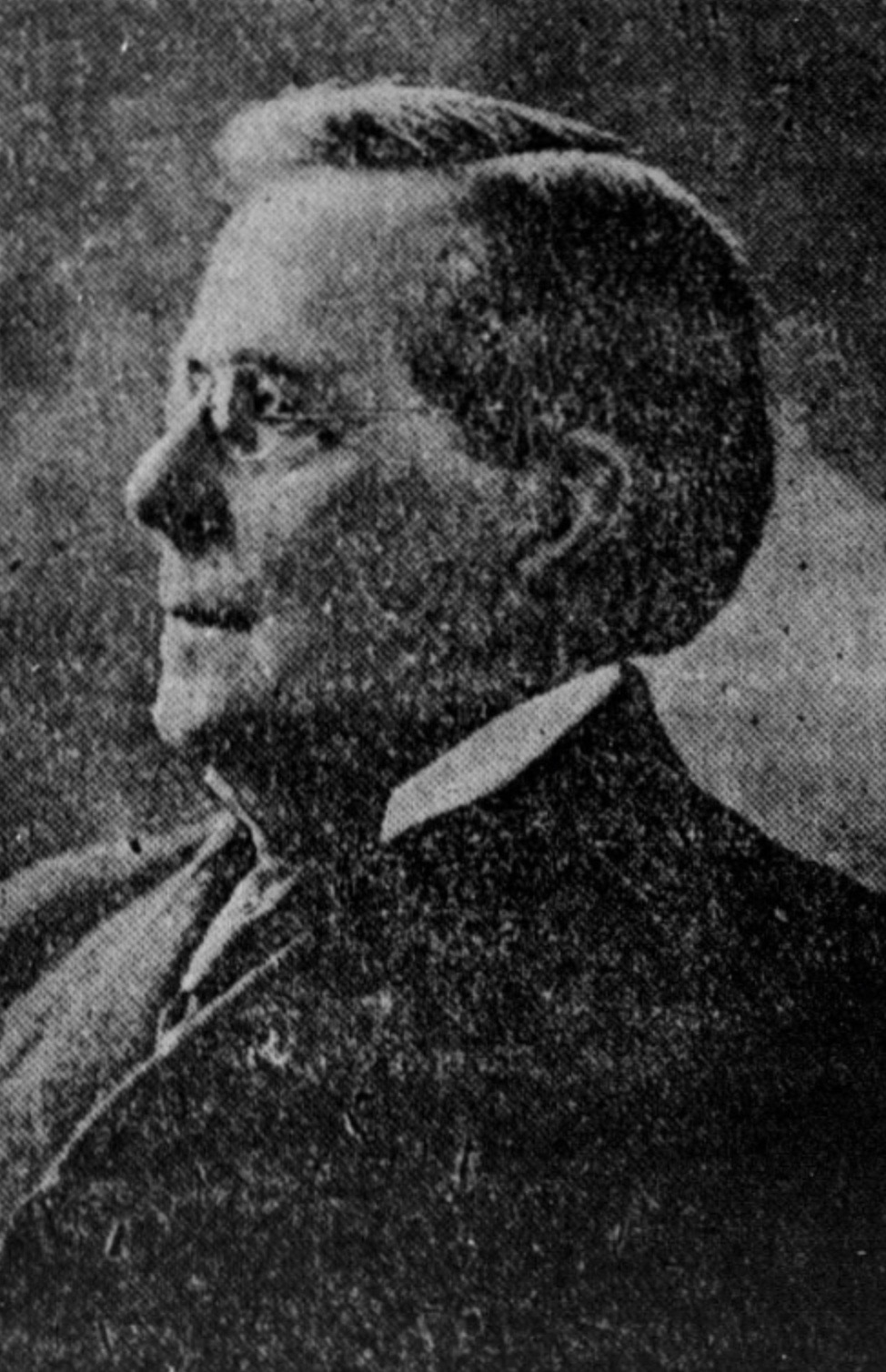
Nominee	William Paine Lord	Nathan Pierce	William Galloway
Party	Republican	Populist	Democratic
Popular vote	41,139	26,123	17,865
Percentage	47.23%	29.99%	20.51%
- County results Chamberlain: 30–40% 40–50% 50–60% Pierce: 30–40% 40–50% 50–60% Galloway: 30–40%
Governor before election
Sylvester Pennoyer
Democratic
Elected Governor
William Paine Lord
Republican

The 1894 Oregon gubernatorial election took place on June 4, 1894, to elect the governor of the U.S. state of Oregon. The election matched Republican William Paine Lord, Chief Justice of the Oregon Supreme Court, against Democrat William Galloway and Populist Nathan Pierce.

== Results ==
1894 Oregon gubernatorial election
Party	Candidate	Votes	%	±%
Republican	William Paine Lord	41,139	47.23%	+0.77%
Populist	Nathan Pierce	26,123 (Note: The House Journal gives Pierce's total as 26,723 but this is clearly a typo.)	29.99%	
Democratic	William Galloway	17,865	20.51%	−33.04%
Prohibition	James Kennedy	1,982	2.28%	
Total votes		87,109	100.00%	
Plurality		15,016	17.24%	
Republican gain from Democratic		Swing	+24.33%	

=== Results by county ===
Crook County, Gilliam County, Josephine County, Klamath County, Lake County, Malheur County, Umatilla County, and Union County all voted Republican for the first time in this election, while Baker County did not vote Democratic for the time as well. This was also the first election since 1862 that Jackson County, Linn County, and Wasco County did not back the Democratic candidate. In fact, this was the only election between 1862 and 1938 in which Linn County voted Republican.

County	William P. Lord Republican		Nathan Pierce Populist		William Galloway Democratic		James Kennedy Prohibition		Margin (Note: Since Pierce ran ahead of Galloway statewide, all margins are Lord over Pierce unless otherwise noted.)		Total votes cast
County	#	%	#	%	#	%	#	%	#	%	Total votes cast
Baker	825	35.35%	874	37.45%	603	25.84%	32	1.37%	-49	-2.10%	2,334
Benton	881	45.77%	335	17.40%	640	33.25%	69	3.58%	241 (Note: Lord's margin over Galloway)	12.52%	1,925
Clackamas	2.281	47.33%	1,788	37.10%	641	13.30%	109	2.26%	493	10.23%	4,819
Clatsop	1,169	50.00%	553	23.65%	548	23.44%	68	2.91%	616	26.35%	2,338
Columbia	728	50.91%	556 (Note: The House Journal gives 558 but this appears to be a typo.)	38.88%	131	9.16%	15	1.05%	172	12.03%	1,430
Coos	658	31.11%	1,063	50.26%	350	16.55%	44	2.08%	-405	-19.15%	2,115
Crook	486	47.37%	139	13.55%	386	37.62%	15	1.46%	100	9.75%	1,026
Curry	259	48.59%	119	22.33%	148	27.77%	7	1.31%	111	20.83%	533
Douglas	1,653	44.70%	905	24.47%	1,073	29.02%	67	1.81%	580	15.68%	3,698
Gilliam	447	50.80%	165	18.75%	249	28.30%	19	2.16%	198	22.50%	880
Grant	763	49.67%	416	27.08%	336	21.88%	21	1.37%	347	22.59%	1,536
Harney	258	33.81%	234	30.67%	264	34.60%	7	0.92%	-6 (Note: Galloway's margin over Lord)	-0.79%	763
Jackson	1,185	36.13%	1,330	40.55%	710	21.65%	55	1.68%	-145	-4.42%	3,280
Josephine	683	42.32%	598	37.05%	313	19.39%	20 (Note: The House Journal gives 10 but this appears to be a typo.)	1.24%	85	5.27%	1,614
Klamath	294	38.43%	276	36.08%	186	24.31%	9	1.18%	18	2.35%	765
Lake	308	40.69%	200	26.42%	242	31.97%	7	0.92%	66	8.72%	757
Lane	2,032	45.23%	1,338	29.78%	1,020	22.70%	103	2.29%	694	15.45%	4,493
Lincoln	377	45.53%	291	35.14%	150	18.12%	10	1.21%	86	10.39%	828
Linn	1,892	39.06%	1,702	35.14%	1,149	23.72%	101	2.09%	190	3.92%	4,844
Malheur	313	38.69%	238	29.42%	241	29.79%	17	2.10%	72	8.90%	809
Marion	3,609	54.73%	1,753	26.58%	1,068	16.20%	164	2.49%	1,856	28.15%	6,594
Morrow	516	45.22%	349	30.59%	258	22.61%	18	1.58%	167	14.64%	1,141
Multnomah	9,367	56.05%	4,444	26.59%	2,569	15.37%	333	1.99%	4,923	29.46%	16,713
Polk	1,367	49.00%	622	22.29%	716	25.66%	85	3.05%	651	23.33%	2,790
Sherman	301	42.45%	203	28.63%	109	15.37%	96	13.54%	98	13.82%	709
Tillamook	492	47.17%	305	29.24%	218	20.90%	28	2.68%	187	17.93%	1,043
Umatilla	1,554	42.75%	1,234	33.95%	791	21.76%	56	1.54%	320	8.80%	3,635
Union	1,371	41.56%	1,045	31.68%	836	25.34%	47	1.42%	326	9.88%	3,299
Wallowa	300	30.09%	538	53.96%	144	14.44%	15	1.50%	-238	-23.87%	997
Wasco	1,277	54.88%	439	18.87%	565	24.28%	46	1.98%	712	30.60%	2,327
Washington	1,933	53.61%	1,121	31.09%	474	13.14%	78	2.16%	812	22.52%	3,606
Yamhill	1,560	44.98%	950	27.39%	737	21.25%	221	6.37%	610	17.59%	3,468
Total	41,139	47.23%	26,123	29.99%	17,865	20.51%	1,982	2.28%	15,016	17.24%	87,109

==== Counties that flipped from Democratic to Republican ====
- Benton
- Clackamas
- Crook
- Douglas
- Gilliam
- Grant
- Josephine
- Klamath
- Lake
- Lane
- Linn
- Malheur
- Morrow
- Polk
- Sherman
- Tillamook
- Umatilla
- Union
- Wasco

==== Counties that flipped from Democratic to Populist ====
- Baker
- Coos
- Jackson

==== Counties that flipped from Republican to Populist ====
- Wallowa
