= Francis Weld Peabody =

American physician (1881–1927)

Francis Weld Peabody (November 24, 1881 – October 13, 1927) was an American physician. He was known for his research on polio and typhoid fever, and was celebrated as a teacher at Harvard Medical School.

== Early life and education ==
Peabody was born on November 24, 1881, in Cambridge, Massachusetts. He was the third of four children: William, Gertrude, Francis, and John. His father, Francis Greenwood Peabody, (1847–1936) was a Harvard graduate and minister

He finished his formal schooling in 1898, graduating with mediocre grades from the Buckingham Browne & Nichols School in Cambridge, Massachusetts, . In May, 1899, both Francis and his younger brother John were stricken with typhoid while on vacation in Florence, Italy. The younger brother died on May 27. It is believed that the death of his younger brother played a role in Francis’ decision to choose medicine as a career.

He graduated from Harvard College in 1903 and entered Harvard Medical School in September. Despite his unremarkable academic record up to this point, he excelled in medical school. During his studies, he distinguished himself as a compassionate clinician, committing long hours to case studies and devoting his attention to each patient he came into contact with. He graduated in June 1907 with honors.

After graduating from medical school, he served a one-year internship on the Medical Service of the Massachusetts General Hospital.

== Medical career ==
In 1910 he worked in Germany, at the chemistry laboratory of Franz Joseph Emil Fischer. From 1912-1915 he worked at the Peter Bent Brigham Hospital as a resident physician. In 1915 he became an associate professor of medicine at Harvard Medical School and in 1921 he became a professor there.

He made significant contributions to understanding pernicious anemia while doing research at the Harvard-Thorndike Laboratory.

Among his postings, he worked at distinguished hospitals including Johns Hopkins, Rockefeller Hospital, Peter Bent Brigham Hospital, and Boston City Hospital.

== Overseas travels ==
Peabody arrived in Peking, China on April 18, 1914, for an extensive medical trip, and after returning home for nearly three years, left for Romania in August 1917 on a Red Cross Commission during World War I. In February 1918, the Romanian government ended hostilities with Germany and the German government ordered all French, British and American relief operations to leave the country. Peabody left Romania and travelled to Moscow, where he arrived in November 1917, in order to acquire supplies for his hospital in Romania before the German takeover. Housed in a hotel-turned-hospital near the Kremlin, he became a refugee and eyewitness to the Bolshevik Revolution. He finally returned home unharmed in early 1918.

== Marriage and family life ==
Francis W. Peabody married Virginia Chandler on December 19, 1919. Together they had two sons: Francis Weld Peabody Jr. and Grigsby Chandler Peabody, born on April 22, 1924, and December 16, 1925, respectively.

== The Care of the Patient ==
One of the essential qualities of the clinician is interest in humanity, for the secret of the care of the patient is in caring for the patient. Dr. Francis Peabody is most often quoted in his essay The Care of the Patient, which first appeared in The Journal of the American Medical Association. Since it was published, it has become part of medical school curriculum and is said to be as valid today as it was at the time he first presented it. He also published another essay, The Patient and the Man, which presented his ideas along the same line.

== Death ==
Peabody died of cancer, on October 13, 1927. While stricken, on his death bed, he wrote objectively about the effects of morphine, which is also a widely cited essay.

== Essays ==
Some essays were collected in Doctor and patient: papers on the relationship of the physician to men and institutions (1930).

- The Patient and the Man (November 22, 1922)
- The Care of the Patient (JAMA 1927; 88:877-882)
- Notes on the Effects of Morphine (October 8, 1927)
