= John Shaffer (Utah politician) =

7th Governor of Utah Territory

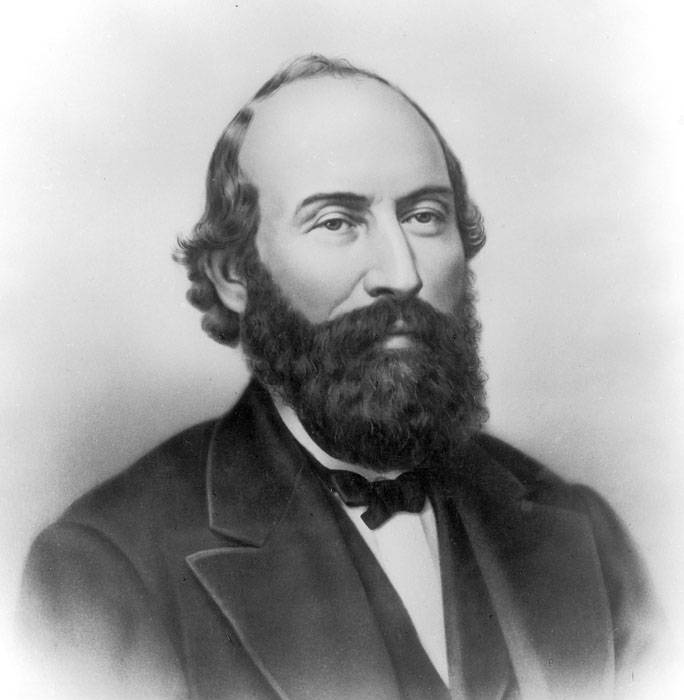

7th Governor of Utah Territory
- In office March 20, 1870 – October 31, 1870
- Nominated by: Ulysses S. Grant
- Preceded by: Charles Durkee
- Succeeded by: Vernon H. Vaughan

Personal details
- Born: July 5, 1827 Lewisburg, Pennsylvania
- Died: October 31, 1870 (aged 43) Salt Lake City, Utah
- Resting place: Freeport City Cemetery, Freeport, Illinois
- Party: Republican

John Wilson Shaffer (July 5, 1827 – October 31, 1870) was an American politician and businessman who served as the 7th Governor of Utah Territory.

== Biography ==
Born in Lewisburg, Pennsylvania, Shaffer was active in Republican politics in Illinois. In 1849, Shaffer settled in Freeport, Illinois and was involved in the mercantile business. Then, in 1856, he was elected sheriff of Stephenson County, Illinois. He was elected clerk and recorder for the Illinois Circuit Court for Stephenson County. Shaffer served in the 15th Illinois Volunteer Infantry Regiment during the American Civil War and later served as quartermaster, being brevetted brigadier general when the war ended. He was appointed governor of the territory of Utah by President Ulysses S. Grant. He was known for his strict opposition of any hint of rebellion against the federal government, which led to concerns with the Mormon population. He died suddenly during his first year as governor.

== Notes ==
Political offices
Preceded by Charles Durkee	Governor of Utah Territory; 1870	Succeeded by Vernon H. Vaughan
