= 1894 Nebraska gubernatorial election =

- November 6, 1894
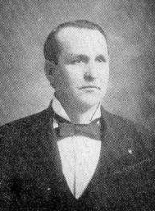

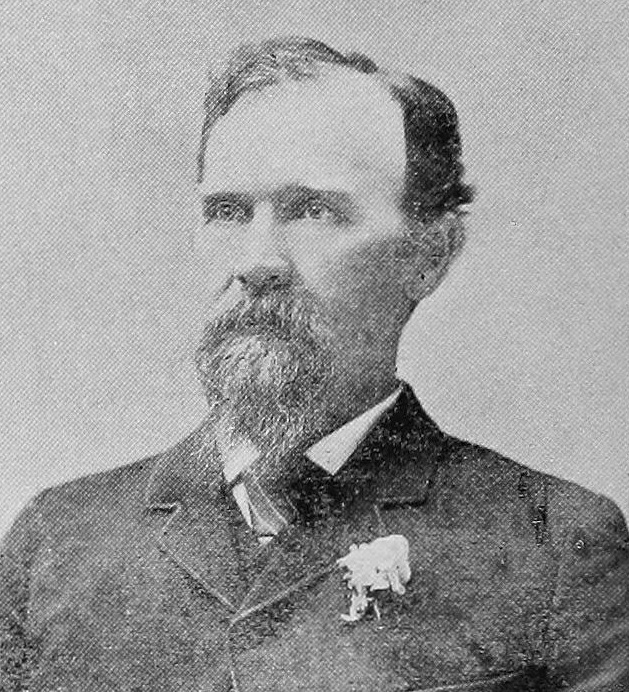
Nominee	Silas A. Holcomb	Thomas Jefferson Majors
Party	Populist	Republican
Alliance	Democratic
Popular vote	97,815	94,623
Percentage	47.98%	46.41%
- County results Holcomb: 40–50% 50–60% 60–70% Majors: 40–50% 50–60% Tie: 40–50%
Governor before election
Lorenzo Crounse
Republican
Elected Governor
Silas A. Holcomb
Populist

The 1894 Nebraska gubernatorial election was held on November 6, 1894. Incumbent Republican Governor Lorenzo Crounse did not stand for re-election. Populist and Democratic fusion nominee Silas A. Holcomb defeated the Republican nominee, incumbent Lieutenant Governor of Nebraska Thomas Jefferson Majors.

== General election ==
=== Candidates ===
- Silas A. Holcomb, People's Independent and Democratic fusion candidate, district court judge
- Thomas Jefferson Majors, Republican candidate, Nebraska Lieutenant Governor
- Phelps D. Sturdevant, Straight Democratic Party (anti-populist) candidate, Nebraska State Treasurer from 1883 to 1885
- Edward A. Gerrard, Prohibition Party candidate, publisher of a prohibition newspaper called The Looking Glass from Monroe, Nebraska

=== Results ===
Nebraska gubernatorial election, 1894
Party	Candidate	Votes	%
Populist	Silas A. Holcomb	97,815	47.98%
Republican	Thomas Jefferson Majors	94,623	46.41%
Democratic	Phelps D. Sturdevant	6,989	3.43%
Prohibition	Edward A. Gerrard	4,439	2.18%
Total votes		203,866	100.0%
Populist gain from Republican			

== See also ==
- 1894 Nebraska lieutenant gubernatorial election
