= William Kinnaird Rose =

Scottish journalist, war correspondent, investigator and editor

William Kinnaird Rose (1845–1919), was a Scottish journalist, war correspondent, investigator and editor of the Brisbane Courier.

== Biography ==
Rose was born in Glasgow in 1845 and educated at Kilmarnock Academy, Ayr Academy and the University of Edinburgh. After graduation Rose acted as special commissioner of the London Daily Telegraph investigating the condition of Scotch agricultural labourers.

During the Russo-Turkish wars of the late 19th century, Rose worked as a correspondent for The Scotsman newspaper, and served on the staff of Russian General Mikhail Skobelev. Rose was present during the Siege of Plevna, the capture of the Gravitza redoubt, and most of the other battles in that conflict. He was wounded several times .

After coming home from Eastern Europe, Rose returned to the University of Edinburgh for three years to study law

In 1879, Rose returned to Eastern Europe as a special commissioner to investigate the conditions of Christians living under Ottoman Turkish rule in Roumelia, Macedonia, Albania and Armenia. During his stay in Europe, Rose narrowly escape assassination in Albania, and was temporarily imprisoned in Rome on a charge of possessing forged notes given him by a dealer in antiquities. Back in England, Rose's report was a subject of debate in both Houses of Parliament.

In 1884, on the advice of Sir Thomas McIlwraith, Rose moved to Queensland in Australia. In December 1884, he was admitted to the Bar Association in that city. In 1885, Rose was appointed a commissioner to inquire into the Polynesian labour traffic. Rose's report was critical of this method of supplying labour to the Queensland sugar plantations. At the beginning of 1888, Rose became editor-in-chief of the Courier. In 1891, Rose returned to England.

== Publications ==
- "The Russian Bayard: Personal Reminiscences of General Scobeleff". The Fortnightly Review. XXXII (CXC): 405–419. October 1882 – via Internet Archive.
- A History of Agriculture in Scotland
- Political Ethnology
- A Popular Handbook on Forestry
- With the Greeks in Thessaly. London: Methuen & Co. 1897 – via Internet Archive.
