= 1862 Oregon gubernatorial election =

- June 2, 1862
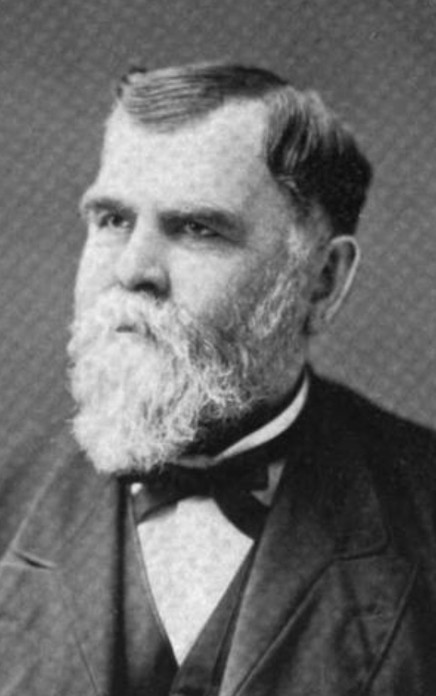

Nominee	A. C. Gibbs	John F. Miller
Party	National Union	Democratic
Popular vote	7,029	3,450
Percentage	67.08%	32.92%
- County results Gibbs: 50–60% 60–70% 70–80% 80–90% >90% Miller: 50–60%
Governor before election
John Whiteaker
Democratic
Elected Governor
A. C. Gibbs
National Union

The 1862 Oregon gubernatorial election took place on June 2, 1862, to elect the governor of the U.S. state of Oregon. The election matched National Union Addison Crandall Gibbs against Democratic former member of the Territorial Legislature John F. Miller. Gibbs defeated Miller in a landslide.

== Results ==
1862 Oregon gubernatorial election
Party	Candidate	Votes	%	±%
National Union	A. C. Gibbs	7,029	67.08%	+22.22%
Democratic	John F. Miller	3,450	32.92%	−21.74%
Total votes		10,479	100.00%	
Majority		3,579	34.15%	
National Union gain from Democratic		Swing	+43.96%	

=== Results by county ===
County	A. C. Gibbs National Union		John F. Miller Democratic		Margin		Total votes cast
County	#	%	#	%	#	%	Total votes cast
Benton	258	54.66%	214	45.34%	44	9.32%	472
Clackamas	650	71.27%	262	28.73%	388	42.54%	912
Clatsop	56	84.85%	10	15.15%	46	69.70%	66
Columbia	69	60.00%	46	40.00%	23	20.00%	115
Coos	89	95.70%	4	4.30%	85	91.40%	93
Curry	110	92.44%	9	7.56%	101	84.87%	119
Douglas	354	57.94%	257	42.06%	97	15.88%	611
Jackson	540	56.43%	417	43.57%	123	12.85%	957
Josephine	235	48.96%	245	51.04%	-10	-2.08%	480
Lane	446	55.82%	353	44.18%	93	11.64%	799
Linn	661	57.03%	498	42.97%	163	14.06%	1,159
Marion	951	78.99%	253	21.01%	698	57.97%	1,204
Multnomah	643	76.37%	199	23.63%	444	52.73%	842
Polk	384	76.80%	116	23.20%	268	53.60%	500
Tillamook	26	100.00%	0	0.00%	26	100.00%	26
Umpqua	148	86.05%	24	13.95%	124	72.09%	172
Wasco	698	70.58%	291	29.42%	407	41.15%	989
Washington	303	77.69%	87	22.31%	216	55.38%	390
Yamhill	408	71.20%	165	28.80%	243	42.41%	573
Total	7,029	67.08%	3,450	32.92%	3,579	34.15%	10,479

==== Counties that flipped from Democratic to National Union ====
- Coos
- Curry
- Jackson
- Lane
- Linn
- Marion
- Polk
- Tillamook
- Umpqua
- Wasco
