= 1894 Connecticut lieutenant gubernatorial election =

- November 6, 1894
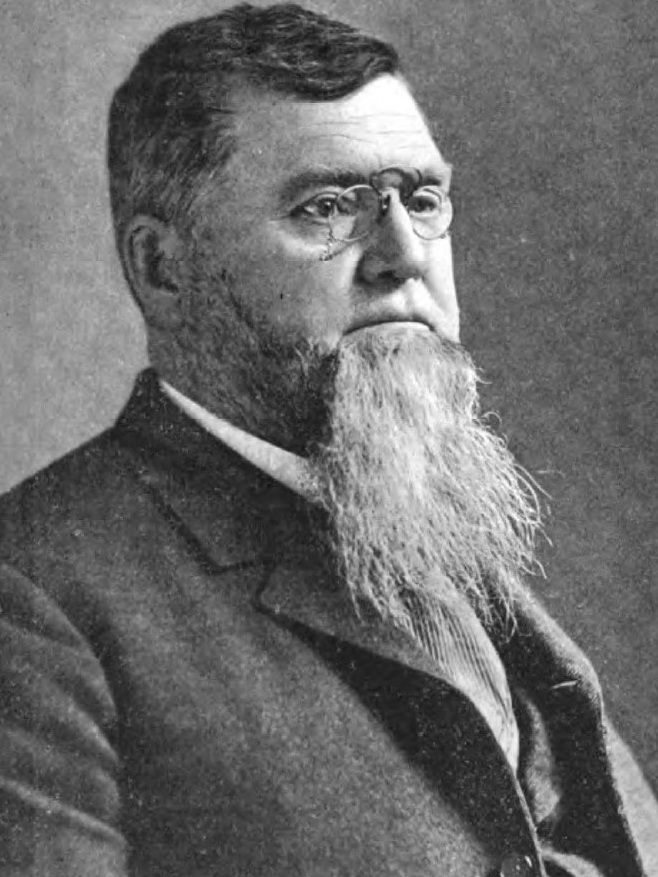

Nominee	Lorrin A. Cooke	Morris Beardsley
Party	Republican	Democratic
Popular vote	83,983	66,329
Percentage	55.90%	44.10%
Lieutenant Governor before election
Ernest Cady
Democratic
Elected Lieutenant Governor
Lorrin A. Cooke
Republican

The 1894 Connecticut lieutenant gubernatorial election was held on November 6, 1894, to elect the lieutenant governor of Connecticut. Republican nominee and former lieutenant governor Lorrin A. Cooke won the election against Democratic nominee Morris Beardsley.

== General election ==
On election day, November 6, 1894, Republican nominee Lorrin A. Cooke won the election with 55.90% of the vote, thereby gaining Republican control over the office of lieutenant governor. Cooke was sworn in for his second non-consecutive term on January 9, 1895.

=== Results ===
Connecticut lieutenant gubernatorial election, 1894
Party	Candidate	Votes	%
Republican	Lorrin A. Cooke	83,983	55.90
Democratic	Morris Beardsley	66,329	44.10
Total votes		150,312	100.00
Republican gain from Democratic			
