= 1894 Boston mayoral election =

Election in Massachusetts, United States

- December 11, 1894
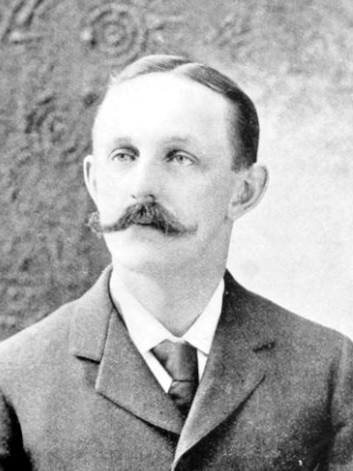

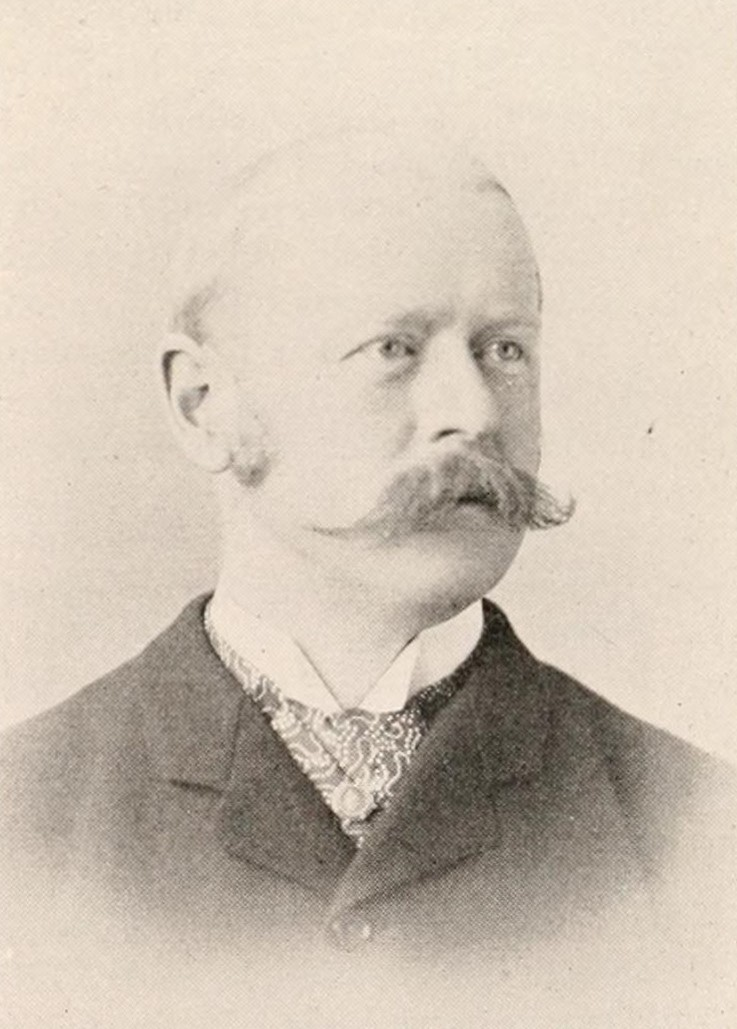
Candidate	Edwin Upton Curtis	Francis Peabody Jr.
Party	Republican	Democratic
Popular vote	34,982	32,425
Percentage	51.0%	47.3%
Mayor before election
Nathan Matthews Jr.
Democratic
Elected mayor
Edwin Upton Curtis
Republican

The 1894 Boston mayoral election occurred on Tuesday, December 11, 1894. Republican nominee Edwin Upton Curtis defeated Democratic nominee Francis Peabody Jr., and two other contenders, to win election as Mayor of Boston.

This was the last Boston mayoral election for a one-year term; the city charter was changed in June 1895, increasing the mayoral term to two years.

Curtis was inaugurated on Monday, January 7, 1895.

== Candidates ==
- Edwin Upton Curtis (Republican), former City Clerk of Boston (1889–1890)
- Phinehas P. Field (Populist)
- Abijah Hall (Prohibition)
- Francis Peabody Jr. (Democrat), attorney

== Results ==
Candidates		General Election	
Candidates		Votes	%
R	Edwin Upton Curtis	34,982	51.0%
D	Francis Peabody Jr.	32,425	47.3%
P	Phinehas P. Field	868	1.3%
PRO	Abijah Hall	305	0.4%
all others		8	0.0%

== See also ==
- List of mayors of Boston, Massachusetts
