= J. S. Morgan & Co. =

Defunct merchant bank

J. S. Morgan & Co. was a merchant banking firm based in London and New York City founded by Junius Spencer Morgan, father of J. P. Morgan.

== History ==
The business had originally been started by the American merchant George Peabody conducting business on his own account when he took up residence in London in 1838. The business was formally incorporated as George Peabody & Co. in 1851. Peabody's American agent was the New York bank, Duncan, Sherman & Company.

=== J. S. Morgan & Co. ===
Upon Peabody's retirement in 1864, control was assumed by Morgan who had joined the firm as a partner in 1854. As a consequence the firm was re-styled J. S. Morgan & Co. The firm's New York agency was later to become J.P. Morgan & Co. (under the leadership of Junius' son J. Pierpont Morgan, who had apprenticed as a cashier at Duncan, Sherman & Co.) a predecessor firm of JPMorgan Chase. A distant relative of Peabody, Massachusetts banker and merchant Samuel Endicott Peabody, became a partner in the firm around 1875.

J. S. Morgan & Co. came to real prominence in 1871 when they undertook the issue of a French war loan during the Franco-Prussian War. On the death of Junius in 1890, Pierpont became the senior partner of the London firm. By 1910, all the firm's Morgan family partners were resident in the U.S. and to reflect this the London partnership was restructured with J. P. Morgan & Co. in the U.S. assuming a 50% ownership of the London business which was reconstituted as Morgan Grenfell & Co. in recognition of the senior London-based partner, Edward Grenfell.
