= Belle G. Bigelow =

American suffragist and prohibitionist

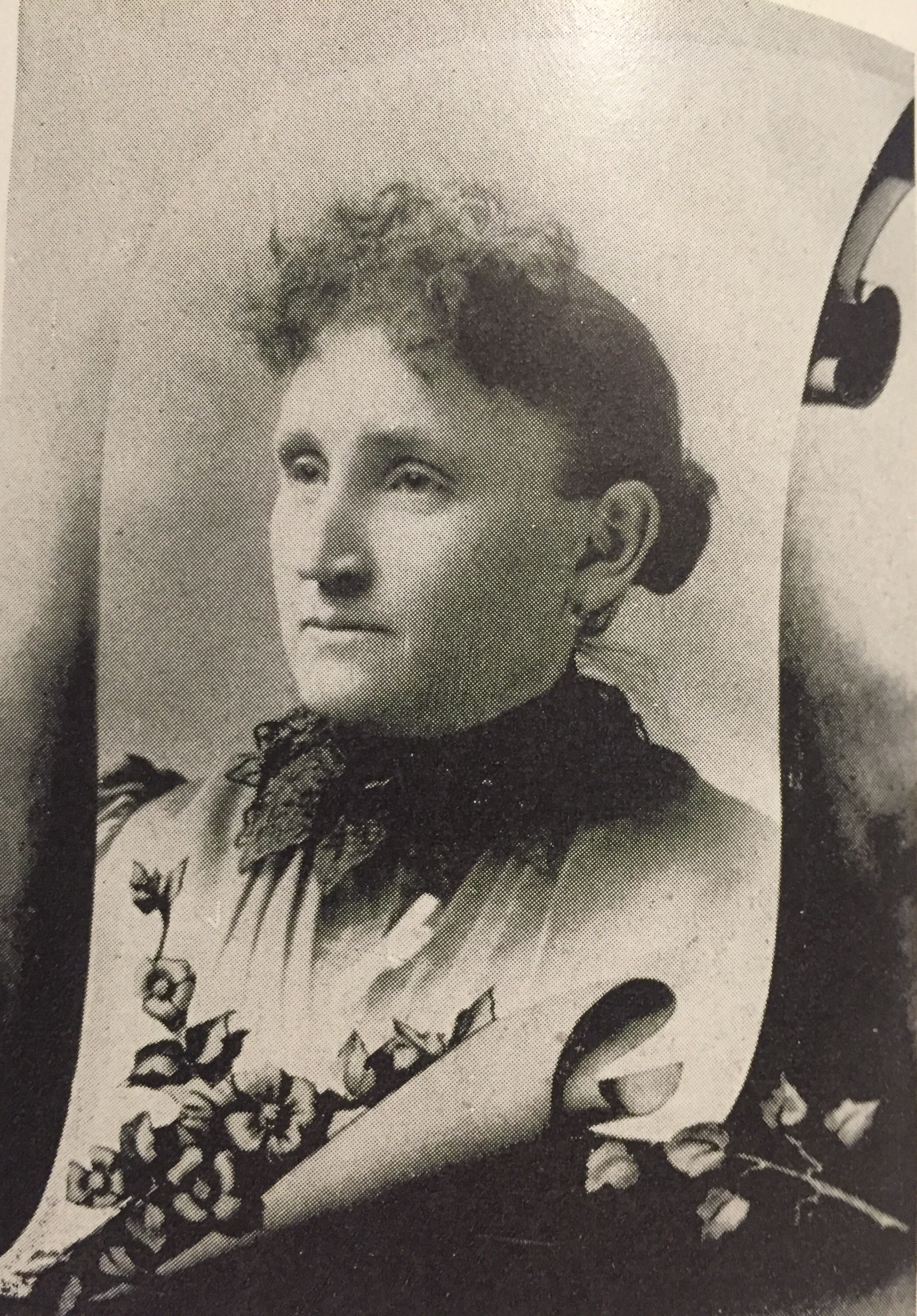
- Portrait from "A Woman of the Century"
- Born: Isabelle Gabriel Green; February 16, 1851; Gilead Township, Michigan
- Died: January 11, 1925 (aged 73)
- Resting place: Wyuka Cemetery, Lincoln, Nebraska
- Occupation: Suffragist
- Spouse: George E. Bigelow (m. 1869–1907) his death

Isabelle Gabriel Green Bigelow (February 16, 1851 – January 11, 1925) was an American suffragist and prohibitionist.

== Early life and education ==
Isabelle (nickname "Belle") Gabriel Green was born on a farm in Gilead Township, Michigan, on February 16, 1851, the daughter of Elijah C S Green (1825–1897) and Nancy M Green (1831–1861). Her mother died when Belle was ten years old.

Her education was confined to the district school. She has been from early childhood an omnivorous reader.

== Career ==
At the age of eighteen Belle G. Bigelow began to teach.

After eight years of quiet home life at Geneva, Nebraska, the question of the Women's suffrage amendment being brought before the people, she entered into its advocacy. Soon becoming known as a talker and writer on that subject, she was elected president of the county Equal Suffrage Association and sent as a delegate to the State convention in Omaha, Nebraska. There she made her first appearance as a public speaker and her reception encouraged a continuance of work in that line. The next winter, in Lincoln, Nebraska, she was elected to the office of State secretary and traveled over the State in the interest of the amendment, making effective speeches where opportunity offered and awakening much interest in the subject. She was twice a candidate for County Superintendent of Instruction on the prohibition ticket, in 1885 and again in 1892, but did not win either race. She represented the State in the national convention of that party held in Indianapolis in 1888. In 1894 she was nominated for Lieutenant Governor.

She served for five years as secretary of the Lincoln Woman's Christian Temperance Union, being a member of the union in its infancy. She was superintendent of foreign work for the State union, and was elected delegate to the national convention in Boston in 1891. She was known as an interesting writer for the press on both religious and secular topics.

== Personal life ==
On September 22, 1869 Belle G. Bigelow married George E. Bigelow (1851–1907), of Ravenna, Ohio. In 1873 they moved and settled in Geneva, Nebraska, being the first residents of that place. They had eight children, four of whom living: Maude H. (1873–1886), Blanche L. (1874–1874), Venice (b. 1875), Erritt B. (b. 1877), James Garfield (1880–1880), George Clifford (1883–1937), Helen M. (b. 1889), Hawley E. (b. 1896).

She died on January 11, 1925, and is buried at Wyuka Cemetery, Lincoln.
