= 1894 United Kingdom local elections =

The 1894 United Kingdom local elections took place in late 1894. The elections were the first following the Local Government Act 1894 (56 & 57 Vict. c. 73), which had created Urban and Rural Districts in England and Wales, and saw the election of members to these various new districts.

Party politics in local municipal government was undeveloped at this point, with many candidates making no reference to their party affiliations, and instead running on local or personal platforms. The election did however see increasing numbers of both Independent Labour, and also Socialist, candidates. In most instance these candidates appeared to win votes at the expense of Liberals, allowing Conservative candidates to capture Liberal seats. Prominent examples of this took place in Northampton, Salford, and Portsmouth.

By 2 November the Conservatives had gained 69 seats in England, the Liberals 29, Labour 15, Liberal Unionists 8, Independents 6, and Socialists 2.
