= List of governors of Oregon =

The governor of Oregon is the head of government of the U.S. state of Oregon and the highest-ranking official in the state.

== List of governors ==
The Oregon Country was obtained by the United States on January 30, 1819, as a shared region with the United Kingdom. The Oregon Treaty ended the sharing and formally established the borders on June 17, 1846.

The Champoeg Meetings, including a constitutional committee, held from February 1841 until May 1843, served as a de facto government before the government was officially established. While early attempts at establishing a government had been unsuccessful because of discontent between English American and French Canadian settlers over the question of whom they should choose as governor, several other officers were elected at these meetings, including Ira Babcock as Supreme Judge. For lack of a government, the Supreme Judge also received executive and legislative duties.

The meetings at Champoeg led up to the first constitution of the Oregon Country and several petitions for U.S. territorial status. The resulting acts created a provisional government on July 5, 1843. The first leaders of this government were an elected three-person Executive Committee. Later, George Abernethy was elected governor, and served from June 3, 1845, to March 3, 1849, though this government was never recognized by the federal government.

=== Oregon Territory ===
The region was organized as Oregon Territory on August 14, 1848. During its history it had five governors appointed by the president of the United States.

Governors of the Territory of Oregon
No.	Governor	Term in office (Note: The range given is from the date the governor was confirmed by the Senate, or appointed by the President during a Senate recess, to the date the governor's successor was confirmed, unless noted.)	Appointed by
1	Joseph Lane (1801–1881)	August 18, 1848 (Note: James Shields was nominated and confirmed by the Senate on August 14, 1848; however, he declined the post. Lane was then appointed on August 18, 1848, during a Senate recess; nominated on December 12; and confirmed by the Senate on December 20. He took the oath of office in the territory on March 3, 1849.) – October 2, 1849 (411 days; replaced) (Note: Lane's successor Gaines was confirmed by the Senate on October 2, 1849. However, it took him nine months to reach the territory, and Lane had received no official notice of his replacement, so he continued acting as governor until he resigned on June 18, 1850. Territorial Secretary Kintzing Pritchette acted as governor until Gaines arrived.)	James K. Polk
2	John P. Gaines (1795–1857)	October 2, 1849 (Note: Joseph G. Marshall was appointed on August 9, 1849, during a Senate recess, but declined the post. Some sources say that Abraham Lincoln was then appointed but declined, but the Territorial Papers have no record of a formal appointment. Gaines was appointed on October 2, 1849, during a Senate recess; nominated on December 21, 1849; and confirmed by the Senate on September 9, 1850. He arrived in the territory in August 1850.) – May 16, 1853 (1323 days; replaced)	Millard Fillmore
3	Joseph Lane (1801–1881)	May 16, 1853 (Note: Lane was nominated on March 15, 1853, and confirmed by the Senate on March 16.) – May 18, 1853 (3 days; resigned) (Note: Lane resigned three days after taking office, his goal of replacing the current unpopular governor complete, to return to his seat in the United States House of Representatives. Territorial Secretary George Law Curry acted as governor until his successor arrived.)	Franklin Pierce
4	John Wesley Davis (1799–1859)	September 6, 1853 (Note: Davis was appointed on September 6, 1853, during a Senate recess, and nominated and confirmed by the Senate on February 4, 1854.) – August 1, 1854 (330 days; resigned) (Note: McMullin & Walker say Davis resigned, but no further details are given. Territorial Secretary George Law Curry acted as governor until he was appointed successor.)	Franklin Pierce
5	George Law Curry (1820–1878)	November 1, 1854 (Note: Curry was appointed on November 1, 1854, during a Senate recess; nominated on July 7, 1856, but was not confirmed before the Senate session expired; and nominated and confirmed by the Senate on August 22, 1856. The territorial papers also note an appointment or confirmation on March 5, 1855, but no other information has been found on this date.) – July 8, 1858 (1346 days; statehood)	Franklin Pierce

=== State of Oregon ===
The state of Oregon was admitted to the Union on February 14, 1859.

The 1857 Constitution of Oregon provided for the election of a governor every four years, to serve no more than eight out of any twelve years. This length and limit have never been changed. It is one of the few states without a lieutenant governor; the office would devolve upon the secretary of state upon vacancy until a 1920 amendment put the president of the Senate first in the line of succession, and a 1972 amendment returned the secretary of state to the front.

Governors of the State of Oregon
No.	Governor	Term in office	Party	Election
1	John Whiteaker (1820–1902)	July 8, 1858 (Note: Whiteaker was sworn in on July 8, 1858, eight months before Oregon formally became a state.) – September 10, 1862 (1526 days; retired)	Democratic	1858
2	A. C. Gibbs (1825–1886)	September 10, 1862 – September 12, 1866 (1464 days; retired)	Republican	1862
3	George Lemuel Woods (1832–1890)	September 12, 1866 – September 14, 1870 (1464 days; retired)	Republican	1866
4	La Fayette Grover (1823–1911)	September 14, 1870 – February 1, 1877 (2333 days; resigned) (Note: Grover resigned, having been elected to the United States Senate.)	Democratic	1870
4	La Fayette Grover (1823–1911)	September 14, 1870 – February 1, 1877 (2333 days; resigned)	Democratic	1874
5	Stephen F. Chadwick (1825–1895)	February 1, 1877 – September 11, 1878 (588 days; retired)	Democratic	Succeeded from secretary of state
6	W. W. Thayer (1827–1899)	September 11, 1878 – September 13, 1882 (1464 days; retired)	Democratic	1878
7	Zenas Ferry Moody (1832–1917)	September 13, 1882 – January 12, 1887 (1583 days; retired)	Republican	1882
8	Sylvester Pennoyer (1831–1902)	January 12, 1887 – January 16, 1895 (2927 days; term-limited) (Note: Governors are ineligible to serve more than eight years in any period of twelve years.)	Democratic (Note: Pennoyer was nominated by the Democratic party in 1886, by the Democrats and Union Party in 1890, and he joined the Populist Party in 1892.)	1886
8	Sylvester Pennoyer (1831–1902)	January 12, 1887 – January 16, 1895 (2927 days; term-limited)	Democratic	1890
9	William Paine Lord (1838–1911)	January 16, 1895 – January 10, 1899 (1456 days; lost nomination)	Republican	1894
10	Theodore Thurston Geer (1851–1924)	January 10, 1899 – January 14, 1903 (1465 days; retired)	Republican	1898
11	George E. Chamberlain (1854–1928)	January 14, 1903 – March 1, 1909 (2239 days; resigned) (Note: Chamberlain resigned, having been elected to the United States Senate.)	Democratic	1902
11	George E. Chamberlain (1854–1928)	January 14, 1903 – March 1, 1909 (2239 days; resigned)	Democratic	1906
12	Frank W. Benson (1858–1911)	March 1, 1909 – June 16, 1910 (473 days; resigned) (Note: Benson resigned due to ill health.)	Republican	Succeeded from secretary of state
13	Jay Bowerman (1876–1957)	June 16, 1910 – January 10, 1911 (209 days; lost election)	Republican	Succeeded from president of the Senate
14	Oswald West (1873–1960)	January 10, 1911 – January 12, 1915 (1464 days; retired)	Democratic	1910
15	James Withycombe (1854–1919)	January 12, 1915 – March 3, 1919 (1512 days; died in office)	Republican	1914
15	James Withycombe (1854–1919)	January 12, 1915 – March 3, 1919 (1512 days; died in office)	Republican	1918
16	Ben W. Olcott (1872–1952)	March 3, 1919 – January 8, 1923 (1408 days; lost election)	Republican	Succeeded from secretary of state
17	Walter M. Pierce (1861–1954)	January 8, 1923 – January 10, 1927 (1464 days; lost election)	Democratic	1922
18	I. L. Patterson (1859–1929)	January 10, 1927 – December 21, 1929 (1077 days; died in office)	Republican	1926
19	Albin Walter Norblad Sr. (1881–1960)	December 21, 1929 – January 12, 1931 (388 days; lost nomination) (Note: Norblad lost the Republican nomination to George W. Joseph; however, Joseph died a month later, and Norblad, who had come in second to Joseph, refused to be considered.)	Republican	Succeeded from President of the Senate
20	Julius Meier (1874–1937)	January 12, 1931 – January 14, 1935 (1464 days; retired)	Independent	1930
21	Charles Martin (1863–1946)	January 14, 1935 – January 9, 1939 (1457 days; lost nomination) (Note: Martin lost the Democratic nomination to Henry L. Hess.)	Democratic	1934
22	Charles A. Sprague (1887–1969)	January 9, 1939 – January 13, 1943 (1466 days; lost nomination)	Republican	1938
23	Earl Snell (1895–1947)	January 13, 1943 – October 28, 1947 (1750 days; died in office)	Republican	1942
23	Earl Snell (1895–1947)	January 13, 1943 – October 28, 1947 (1750 days; died in office)	Republican	1946
24	John Hubert Hall (1899–1970)	October 28, 1947 (Note: Hall technically became governor upon the death of Governor Snell in a plane crash on October 28, though he took a formal oath of office on October 30 after Snell's body was identified.) – January 10, 1949 (441 days; lost nomination)	Republican	Succeeded from speaker of the House (Note: Governor Snell, President of the Senate Marshall E. Cornett, and Secretary of State Robert S. Farrell Jr. died in a plane crash on October 28, 1947; the next in the line of succession was Speaker of the House Hall.)
25	Douglas McKay (1893–1959)	January 10, 1949 – December 17, 1952 (1438 days; resigned) (Note: McKay resigned, in anticipation of being nominated for United States Secretary of the Interior.)	Republican	1948 (special)
25	Douglas McKay (1893–1959)	January 10, 1949 – December 17, 1952 (1438 days; resigned)	Republican	1950
26	Paul L. Patterson (1900–1956)	December 17, 1952 – January 31, 1956 (1141 days; died in office)	Republican	Succeeded from president of the Senate
26	Paul L. Patterson (1900–1956)	December 17, 1952 – January 31, 1956 (1141 days; died in office)	Republican	1954
27	Elmo Smith (1909–1968)	January 31, 1956 (Note: Patterson died late on January 31, and Smith took the oath of office the morning of February 1.) – January 14, 1957 (350 days; lost election)	Republican	Succeeded from president of the Senate
28	Robert D. Holmes (1909–1976)	January 14, 1957 – January 12, 1959 (729 days; lost election)	Democratic	1956 (special)
29	Mark Hatfield (1922–2011)	January 12, 1959 – January 9, 1967 (2920 days; term-limited) (Note: Hatfield, being term-limited, had already won election to the United States Senate when his term ended.)	Republican	1958
29	Mark Hatfield (1922–2011)	January 12, 1959 – January 9, 1967 (2920 days; term-limited)	Republican	1962
30	Tom McCall (1913–1983)	January 9, 1967 – January 13, 1975 (2927 days; term-limited)	Republican	1966
30	Tom McCall (1913–1983)	January 9, 1967 – January 13, 1975 (2927 days; term-limited)	Republican	1970
31	Robert W. Straub (1920–2002)	January 13, 1975 – January 8, 1979 (1457 days; lost election)	Democratic	1974
32	Victor Atiyeh (1923–2014)	January 8, 1979 – January 12, 1987 (2927 days; term-limited)	Republican	1978
32	Victor Atiyeh (1923–2014)	January 8, 1979 – January 12, 1987 (2927 days; term-limited)	Republican	1982
33	Neil Goldschmidt (1940–2024)	January 12, 1987 – January 14, 1991 (1464 days; retired)	Democratic	1986
34	Barbara Roberts (b. 1936)	January 14, 1991 – January 9, 1995 (1457 days; retired)	Democratic	1990
35	John Kitzhaber (b. 1947)	January 9, 1995 – January 13, 2003 (2927 days; term-limited)	Democratic	1994
35	John Kitzhaber (b. 1947)	January 9, 1995 – January 13, 2003 (2927 days; term-limited)	Democratic	1998
36	Ted Kulongoski (b. 1940)	January 13, 2003 – January 10, 2011 (2920 days; term-limited)	Democratic	2002
36	Ted Kulongoski (b. 1940)	January 13, 2003 – January 10, 2011 (2920 days; term-limited)	Democratic	2006
37	John Kitzhaber (b. 1947)	January 10, 2011 – February 18, 2015 (1501 days; resigned) (Note: Kitzhaber resigned due to an ethics scandal.)	Democratic	2010
37	John Kitzhaber (b. 1947)	January 10, 2011 – February 18, 2015 (1501 days; resigned)	Democratic	2014
38	Kate Brown (b. 1960)	February 18, 2015 – January 9, 2023 (2883 days; term-limited)	Democratic	Succeeded from secretary of state
38	Kate Brown (b. 1960)	February 18, 2015 – January 9, 2023 (2883 days; term-limited)	Democratic	2016 (special)
38	Kate Brown (b. 1960)	February 18, 2015 – January 9, 2023 (2883 days; term-limited)	Democratic	2018
39	Tina Kotek (b. 1966)	January 9, 2023 – Incumbent (Note: Kotek's term will expire on January 11, 2027; she was elected to a second term on November 3, 2026.) (in office 1414 days)	Democratic	2022
39	Tina Kotek (b. 1966)	January 9, 2023 – Incumbent (in office 1414 days)	Democratic	2026

== Electoral history (1950–) ==
Year	Democratic nominee			Republican nominee			Independent candidate			Libertarian nominee			Pacific Green nominee			Constitution nominee			Other candidate			Other candidate			Other candidate		
Year	Candidate	#	%	Candidate	#	%	Candidate	#	%	Candidate	#	%	Candidate	#	%	Candidate	#	%	Candidate	#	%	Candidate	#	%	Candidate	#	%
1950	Austin F. Flegel	171,750	33.95%	Douglas McKay	334,160	66.05%	–			–			–			–			–			–			–		
1954	Joseph K. Carson	244,170	43.09%	Paul L. Patterson	322,522	56.91%	–			–			–			–			–			–			–		
1956	Robert D. Holmes	369,439	50.52%	Elmo Smith	361,840	49.48%	–			–			–			–			–			–			–		
1958	Robert D. Holmes	267,934	44.66%	Mark Hatfield	331,900	55.32%	–			–			–			–			–			–			–		
1962	Robert Y. Thornton	265,359	41.63%	Mark Hatfield	345,497	54.20%	Robert H. Wampler	26,142	4.10%	–			–			–			–			–			–		
1966	Robert W. Straub	305,008	44.67%	Tom McCall	377,346	55.26%	–			–			–			–			–			–			–		
1970	Robert W. Straub	292,892	44.30%	Tom McCall	369,964	55.52%	–			–			–			–			–			–			–		
1974	Robert W. Straub	444,812	57.73%	Victor Atiyeh	324,751	42.14%	–			–			–			–			–			–			–		
1978	Robert W. Straub	409,411	45.10%	Victor Atiyeh	498,452	54.90%	–			–			–			–			–			–			–		
1982	Ted Kulongoski	374,316	35.92%	Victor Atiyeh	639,841	61.41%	–			Paul Cleveland	27,394	2.63%	–			–			–			–			–		
1986	Neil Goldschmidt	549,456	51.85%	Norma Paulus	506,989	47.85%	–			–			–			–			–			–			–		
1990	Barbara Roberts	508,749	45.75%	David B. Frohnmayer	444,646	39.98%	Al Mobley	144,062	12.95%	Fred Oerther	14,583	1.31%	–			–			–			–			–		
1994	John Kitzhaber	622,083	50.95%	Denny Smith	517,874	42.41%	–			Danford D. Vander Ploeg	20,183	1.65%	–			–			Ed Hickam (American)	58,449	4.79%	–			–		
1998	John Kitzhaber	717,061	64.42%	Bill Sizemore	334,001	30.01%	–			Richard P. Burke	20,200	1.81%	Blair Bobier	15,843	1.42%	–			Roger Weidner (Reform)	10,144	0.91%	Patti Steurer (Natural Law)	7,823	0.70%	Trey Smith (Socialist)	5,772	0.52%
2002	Ted Kulongoski	618,004	49.03%	Kevin Mannix	581,785	46.16%	–			Tom Cox	57,760	4.58%	–			–			–			–			–		
2006	Ted Kulongoski	699,786	50.73%	Ron Saxton	589,748	42.75%	–			Richard Morley	16,798	1.22%	Joe Keating	20,030	1.45%	Richard Morley	50,229	3.64%	–			–			–		
2010	John Kitzhaber	716,525	49.29%	Chris Dudley	694,287	47.76%	–			Wes Wagner	19,048	1.31%	–			Greg Kord	20,475	1.41%	–			–			–		
2014	John Kitzhaber	733,230	49.89%	Dennis Richardson	648,542	44.13%	–			Paul Grad	21,903	1.49%	Jason Levin	29,561	2.01%	Aaron Auer	15,929	1.08%	Chris Henry (Progressive)	13,898	0.95%	–			–		
2016	Kate Brown	985,027	50.62%	Bud Pierce	845,609	43.45%	Cliff Thomason (Note: As the nominee of the Independent Party of Oregon.)	47,481	2.44%	James Foster	45,191	2.32%	–			Aaron Auer	19,400	1.00%	–			–			–		
2018	Kate Brown	934,498	50.05%	Knute Buehler	814,988	43.65%	Patrick Starnes	53,392	2.86%	Nick Chen	28,927	1.55%	–			Aaron Auer	21,145	1.13%	Chris Henry (Progressive)	11,013	0.59%	–			–		
2022	Tina Kotek	917,074	46.96%	Christine Drazan	850,347	43.54%	Betsy Johnson	168,431	8.63%	R. Leon Noble	6,867	0.35%	–			Donice Smith	8,051	0.41%	–			–			–		

== See also ==
- Gubernatorial lines of succession in the United States § Oregon
- First ladies and gentlemen of Oregon
- Oregon Secretary of State
- List of Oregon Legislative Assemblies

== Sources ==
- "Former Oregon Governors". National Governors Association.
- "Governor Records". Oregon State Archives.
- "Oregon Constitution". State Democracy Research Initiative. University of Wisconsin Law School.
- Dubin, Michael J. (2003). United States Gubernatorial Elections, 1776–1860: The Official Results by State and County. McFarland. ISBN 0-7864-1439-1 – via Internet Archive.
- Glashan, Roy R. (1979). American Governors and Gubernatorial Elections, 1775-1978. Meckler Books. ISBN 0-7201-1511-6 – via Internet Archive.
- Kallenbach, Joseph E.; Kallenbach, Jessamine S. (1977). American State Governors, 1776-1976. Oceana Publications. ISBN 978-0-379-00665-0 – via Internet Archive.
- McMullin, Thomas A.; Walker, David (1984). Biographical Directory of American Territorial Governors. Meckler Publishing. ISBN 0-930466-11-X – via Internet Archive.
- Mullaney, Marie Marmo (1994). Biographical Directory of the Governors of the United States, 1988–1994. Greenwood Publishing Group. ISBN 0-313-28312-5 – via Internet Archive.
- Sobel, Robert; Raimo, John (1978). Biographical Directory of the Governors of the United States, 1789-1978. Vol. 3. Meckler Books. ISBN 0-930466-01-2 – via Internet Archive.
- Thorpe, Francis Newton, ed. (1909). The Federal and State Constitutions, Colonial Charters, and Other Organic Laws of the States, Territories, and Colonies Now or Heretofore Forming the United States of America. Vol. 5. United States Government Publishing Office – via Internet Archive.
- Forsyth, Marjorie Phyllis (1942). The Public Career of Joseph Lane (Master of Arts (MA), History thesis). Butler University.
