= Democratic Party of Oregon =

Oregon affiliate of the Democratic Party

- Abbreviation: DPO
- Chairperson: Nathan Soltz
- Founded: 1851; 174 years ago
- Headquarters: 1220 SW Morrison Street, Suite 910; Portland, Oregon
- Youth wing: Young Democrats of Oregon Caucus
- Membership (2025): ▲981,835
- Ideology: Liberalism
- National affiliation: Democratic Party
- Colors: Blue; Green
- U.S. Senate delegation: 2 / 2
- U.S. House delegation: 5 / 6
- Statewide offices: 5 / 5
- Oregon State Senate: 18 / 30
- Oregon House of Representatives: 37 / 60

Election symbol

Website
- dpo.org

The Democratic Party of Oregon is the Oregon affiliate of the Democratic Party. The State Central Committee, made up of two delegates elected from each of Oregon's 36 counties and one additional delegate for every 15,000 registered Democrats, is the main authoritative body of the party. The party has 17 special group caucuses which also each have representation on the State Central Committee.

After Oregon was admitted as a state in 1859, Oregon elected twice as many Democrats as Republicans between 1859 and 1879 in statewide elections. It is currently the dominant party in the state, holding all but one of Oregon's six United States House of Representatives seats, both United States Senate seats, both houses of the Oregon Legislative Assembly, and the office of governor.

== Platform and legislative agenda ==
The Democratic Party of Oregon hosts a Platform Convention every two years where they set their platform and priority legislative action items. The most recent editions of these documents are available on their website.

At the beginning of the 2022 short session, House Democrats announced priorities such as addressing homelessness and cost of housing, community safety, education, workforce development and training, childcare, access to health care, and climate change.

== Organization ==
As prescribed by Oregon state statutes governing major political parties, the party comprises all registered voters designating their party affiliation as Democrat. In each biennial primary election conducted in even-numbered years, such affiliated voters elect members from each precinct to their respective county's central committee, which in turn elects delegates to a state convention, charged with organizing the party at the state level, and arranging for the day-to-day conduct of the party. These county central committees also send delegates to the standing committees of their respective congressional districts, which support their constituent county central committees and coordinate district-wide party activities and campaigns.

=== Officers ===
- Chair: Nathan Soltz
- Vice-chair: Kim Schmith
- Vice-chair: Eileen Kiely
- Secretary: Jesse Maldonado
- Treasurer: Ashton Simpson
- DNC Member: Steph Newton-Azorr
- DNC Member: Diane Grover
- DNC Member: Kien Truong

=== Party caucuses ===
The state party recognizes 19 party caucuses formed to address specific political issues in their constituent communities:

- Asian American & Pacific Islanders Caucus
- Black Caucus
- Disability Justice Caucus
- Education Caucus
- Elections Integrity Caucus
- Environmental Caucus
- Gun Owners Caucus
- Health Care Caucus
- Jewish Caucus
- Labor Caucus
- Latino Caucus
- Native American Caucus
- Rural Caucus
- Senior Caucus
- Small Business Caucus
- Stonewall Caucus (LGBTQ+)
- Veteran's Caucus
- Women's Caucus
- Young Democrats Caucus

== Current elected officials ==
=== Members of Congress ===
Democrats control both of Oregon's U.S. Senate seats and 5 out of 6 of Oregon's U.S. House seats.

==== U.S. Senate ====
Since 2009, Democrats have held both of Oregon's seats in the U.S. Senate:

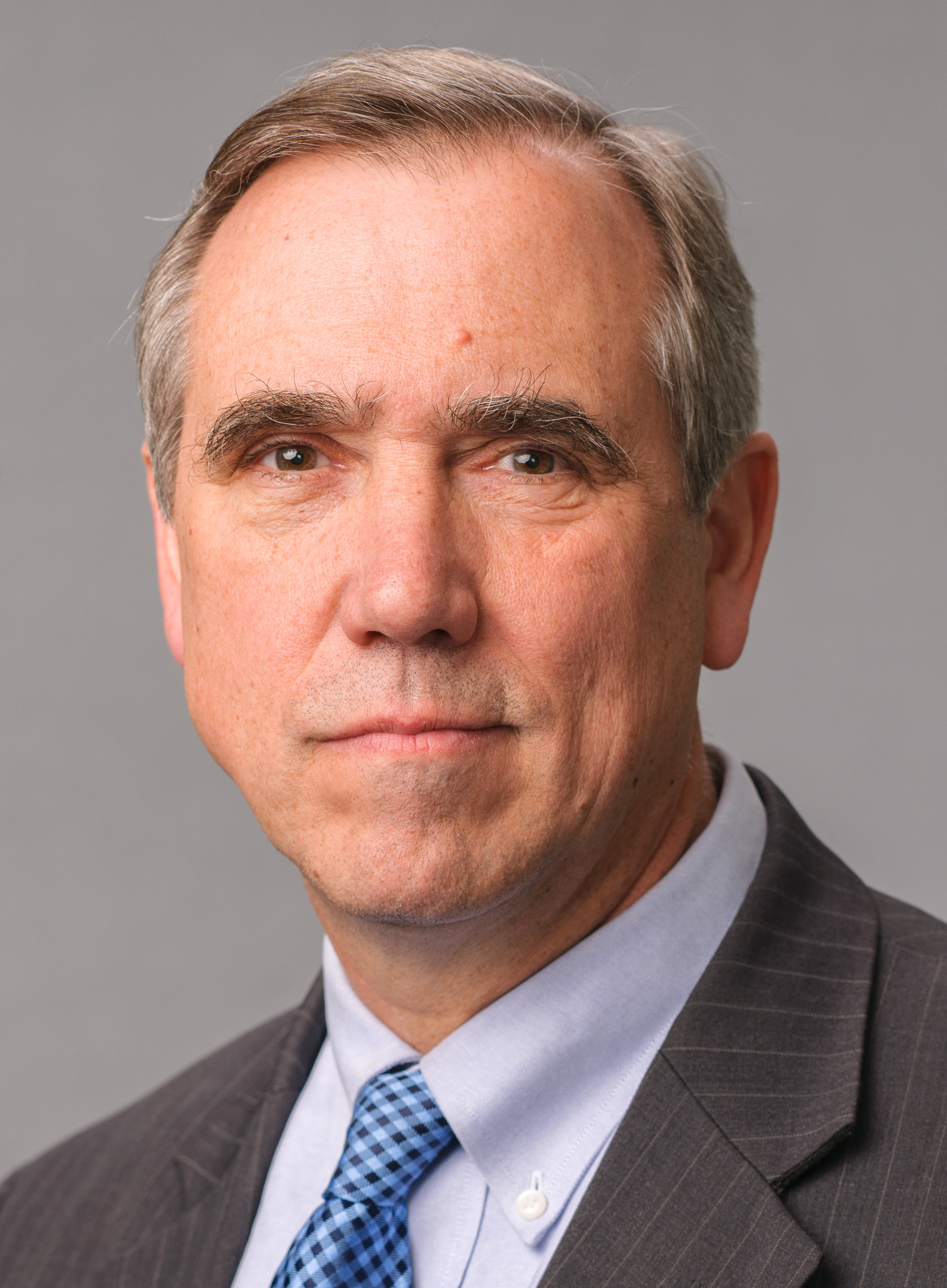
Junior U.S. Senator Jeff Merkley

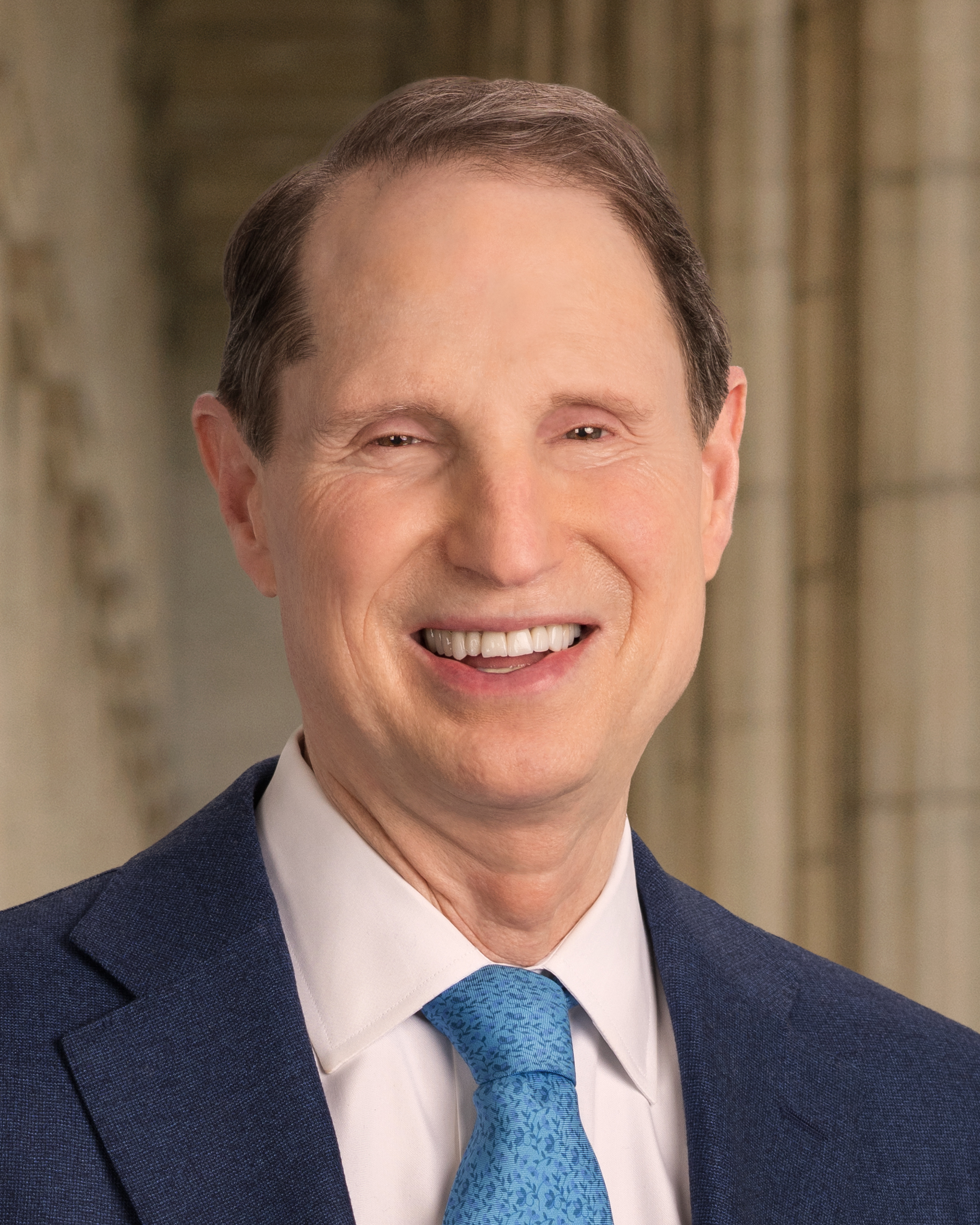
Senior U.S. Senator Ron Wyden

==== U.S. House of Representatives ====
Democrats hold five of the six seats Oregon is apportioned in the U.S. House of Representatives following the 2020 census:

District	Member	Photo
1st	Suzanne Bonamici	
3rd	Maxine Dexter	
4th	Val Hoyle	
5th	Janelle Bynum	
6th	Andrea Salinas	

=== Statewide offices ===
The Oregon Democratic Party holds all five elected state executive offices.

Photo	Office	Officeholder
	Governor	Tina Kotek
	Secretary of State	Tobias Read
	Attorney General	Dan Rayfield
	Treasurer	Elizabeth Steiner
	Commissioner of Labor	Christina Stephenson (officially nonpartisan)

=== Legislative Leadership ===
- Senate President: Rob Wagner
- Senate President Pro Tempore: James I. Manning Jr.
- Senate Majority Leader: Kate Lieber
- Speaker of the House: Dan Rayfield
- Speaker Pro Tempore of the House: Paul Holvey
- House Majority Leader: Julie Fahey
- House Majority Whip: Andrea Valderrama

=== Oregon State Legislature ===
==== Senate ====
District	Home	Senator	Party
3	Ashland	Jeff Golden	Democratic
4	Eugene	Floyd Prozanski	Democratic
7	Eugene	James Manning Jr.	Democratic
8	Corvallis	Sara Gelser	Democratic
10	Salem	Deb Patterson	Democratic
13	Wilsonville	Aaron Woods	Democratic
14	Beaverton	Kate Lieber	Democratic
15	Hillsboro	Janeen Sollman	Democratic
17	Portland	Elizabeth Steiner	Democratic
18	Aloha	Wlnsvey Campos	Democratic
19	Lake Oswego	Rob Wagner	Democratic
20	Gladstone	Mark Meek	Democratic
21	Portland	Kathleen Taylor	Democratic
22	Portland	Lew Frederick	Democratic
23	Portland	Michael Dembrow	Democratic
24	Portland	Kayse Jama	Democratic
25	Troutdale	Chris Gorsek	Democratic

==== House of Representatives ====
District	Home	Representative	Party
5	Ashland	Pam Marsh	Democratic
7	Springfield	John Lively	Democratic
8	Eugene	Paul Holvey	Democratic
10	Otis	David Gomberg	Democratic
13	Eugene	Nancy Nathanson	Democratic
14	Eugene	Julie Fahey	Democratic
16	Corvallis	Dan Rayfield	Democratic
19	Salem	Tom Andersen	Democratic
20	Monmouth	Paul Evans	Democratic
26	Tigard	Ben Bowman	Democratic]
26	Wilsonville	Courtney Neron Misslin	Democratic
27	Beaverton	Ken Helm	Democratic
28	Portland	Dacia Grayber	Democratic
29	Forest Grove	Susan McLain	Democratic
30	Hillsboro	Nathan Sosa	Democratic
33	Portland	Maxine Dexter	Democratic
34	Beaverton	Lisa Reynolds	Democratic
35	Beaverton	Farrah Chaichi	Democratic
36	Hillsboro	Hai Pham	Democratic
37	West Linn	Jules Walters	Democratic
38	Lake Oswego	Daniel Nguyen	Democratic
39	Happy Valley	Janelle Bynum	Democratic
40	Gladstone	Annessa Hartman	Democratic
41	Milwaukie	Mark Gamba	Democratic
42	Portland	Rob Nosse	Democratic
43	Portland	Tawna Sanchez	Democratic
44	Portland	Travis Nelson	Democratic
45	Portland	Thuy Tran	Democratic
46	Portland	Khanh Pham	Democratic
47	Portland	Andrea Valderrama	Democratic
48	Portland	Hoa Nguyen	Democratic
49	Troutdale	Zach Hudson	Democratic
50	Gresham	Ricki Ruiz	Democratic
53	Bend	Emerson Levy	Democratic
54	Bend	Jason Kropf	Democratic

== History ==
=== Territorial period ===
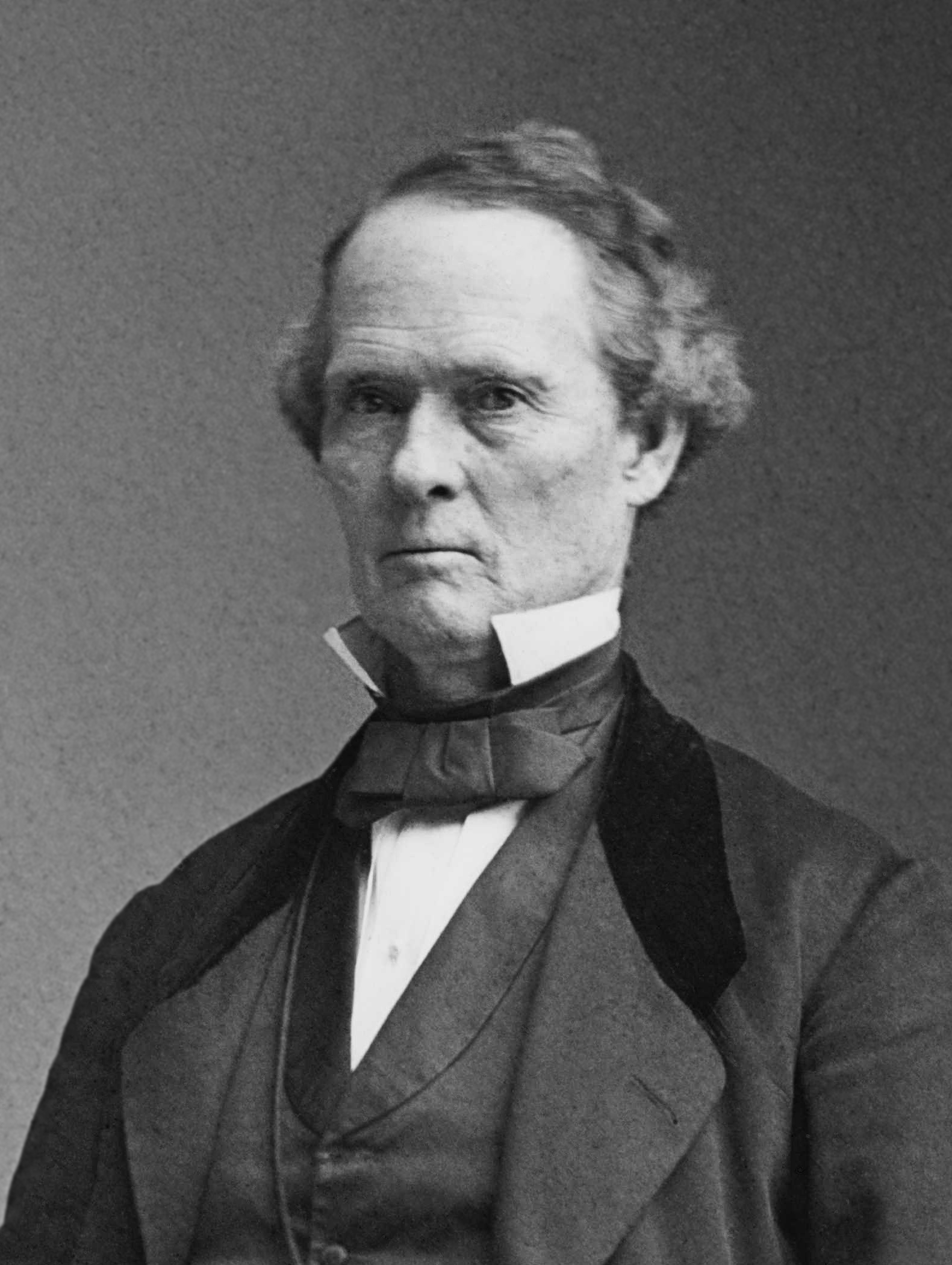
Joseph Lane served as Governor and as a US Senator. He also ran for Vice President in the 1860 election as the running mate of John C. Breckinridge, but was defeated by Abraham Lincoln and Hannibal Hamlin.

An initial call for a "thorough and permanent" Democratic Party organization in the Territory of Oregon was sounded by editor Asahel Bush in his Oregon Statesman in June 1851. The highly partisan Bush kept up a relentless drumbeat in his paper against Whig officials and party members, characterizing them as promoters of "monopolies, tariffs, and bank charters [which] fertilize the rich man's soil with the sweat of the poor man's brow." Bush's call was heeded on Independence Day, 1851, with the convocation of a territorial convention at which a central committee was chosen and James Nesmith was made chairman.

"The Democracy" of the pre-Civil War period was supported primarily by farmers, and featured a regular cycle of party activities during the agricultural slack time of winter through spring which included local caucuses, Jackson jubilees, an annual Jefferson–Jackson Dinner, county conventions, and Fourth of July bonfires.

The Anti-Democrats of the period, worse organized at the Democrats at the precinct, county, and territorial level, focused upon the issues of temperance and advancing Protestant nativism, marching into elections under three distinct political banners: the People's Party in 1853; the Whig and American party in 1855; and the Republican, Independent, and Maine Law in 1857. Their comparatively superior system of party organization led to Democratic dominance in the pre-statehood period, although factionalism revolving around control over federal appropriations and patronage left the Democratic majority party anything but a united organization.

=== Early statehood period ===
The party's first convention post-statehood was held in Salem on April 20, 1859. Bitterly divided over the issue of slavery, the convention nominated Lansing Stout, supported by pro-slavery factions led by Joseph Lane, for the United States House of Representatives over incumbent Democrat La Fayette Grover. Democratic control of the state legislature between 1859 and 1879 resulted in the selection of eight Democrats as US senators, and only three Republicans were chosen. Beginning in the 1880s the Democrats became the minority party when immigrants from Wisconsin, Michigan, Minnesota and foreign countries moving over to Oregon chose the Republican Party as their main party.

With the start of the 1880s the Democrats had become the minority, and that stayed that way, for the most part, until the start of World War II. During those years however there were a few blips such as 1890 that had the Democrats back on the political map. The adoption of the direct primary gave the Democrats new forms of institutional democracy which lead the way for political advancement. The people of Oregon had a new way of thinking about politics and the Democrats started to use the reform-minded mentality that existed in some of the populace to overturn the Republican control of state politics.

=== Democratic reform ===
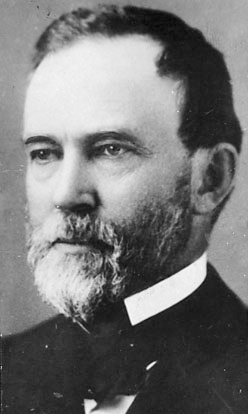
Governor Sylvester Pennoyer was famous for his prickly attitudes toward Presidents Benjamin Harrison and Grover Cleveland, due to him viewing them as "too Conservative".

The Democrats first started to make alliances with third parties in the 1890s but then moved on to market themselves as a partisan organization. The governor at the time, Sylvester Pennoyer, gathered a coalition with a start-up party called the Union Party and independent Republicans from Portland. Pennoyer won his re-election bid and this gave Democrats the confidence they were looking for to beat the Republicans, but the Republicans swept the rest of the state with the exception of a couple of seats in the state legislature. Pennoyer warned both parties of a third party rising due to lack of acknowledgment of political problems that faced the nation. He was correct as the People's Party emerged in Omaha. Pennoyer was agitated with the platforms of both parties that he left and joined the Populists. This created a split in the party between people who wanted to follow Pennoyer to the People's Party and the people who wanted to stay as Democrats.

The refusal of the People's Party to join forces with the Democratic Party led to easy elections for Republicans in the years to come. In 1896 factionalism between these parties led the Republicans carrying Oregon in the presidential and congressional elections. State legislature elections resulted in the Populist leading the Democrats in elected members 18–7. The only meaningful victory that the Democrats could look to was that of Sylvester Pennoyer, who returned to the Democratic ticket and won the election for mayor, being supported by the Democrats and Populists together. The only other Democratic success was that the people of Oregon responded to the call to reform as the Democrats took 12 counties from the Republicans in that presidential election.

=== The Great Depression and the re-emergence of the Democrats ===
Between 1900 and 1932 the Republicans enjoyed a two-one ratio over the Democrats, and sometimes three-one. There was no real changed even during the Franklin D. Roosevelt years where the Republican registration never dipped below 50% throughout the state. This remained the case until the boom in employment caused by World War II. This resulted in a drastic increase in Oregon population, which benefited the Democratic party. Workers that came in provided a base to rebuild the Democratic Party.

As the Great Depression struck the nation in the 1930s the Oregon Democrats saw this as an opportunity to gain prominence once again. The people of the state reacted very strongly against the Republican leadership that was in power during the economic collapse that spark the depression. Party officials believed that this collapse finally gave the party a concrete issue and they also believed that they would be able to make Oregon a two-party state once again. The state committee organized meetings between 1930 and 1932 to plan precinct reorganization throughout the state, and shortly after the spike in meetings, a "Young Democratic League" was formed with an active membership of 2,500 members and they were scattered throughout all of the counties of Oregon. This also ended the avoidance by candidates of the Democratic label as the public saw the Republicans as responsible for the collapse, so the Democrats put themselves out as the party of new ideas. They viewed the label of Democrat as an advantage, as the national Democratic party saw a rise in popularity. As the Oregon Democrats ran in tandem with Roosevelt in the presidential election, they saw instant results, the Democrats gained 10 seats the state legislature, going from 7 to 17 and gaining majority in a 30-seat legislature, and in the state senate going from 1 seat to 8, giving an even split in the state senate. These were not the biggest successes for Oregon Democrats however, Charles H. Martin won reelection in the Third Congressional District and Walter Pierce won the Second Congressional District for the first time in Oregon history. In the 1930s, there was a drastic increase in voter registration for the Democrats, whose numbers rise from 30 percent of state registered voters to 48%, most of this was because of support for FDR's "New Deal". Roosevelt was solid in Oregon for his four election victories, never once losing the state, but the same could not be said for state Democrats. They were never able to win a senate seat and after the initial Roosevelt election year; the state Democrats did not gain any more congressional seats that were significant.

=== The fall of the Democrats ===
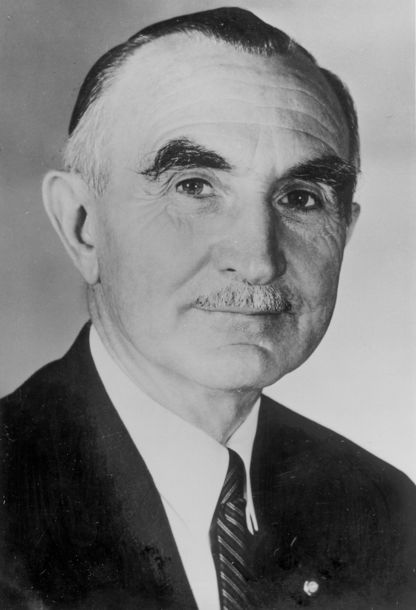
US Senator Wayne Morse notably opposed the national leadership of the Democratic Party and was a staunch opponent of the Vietnam War

The rise of the Democrats was short-lived during this period and the fall can be attributed to the gubernatorial election of former congress member, Democrat Charles H. Martin. Martin ran and won the Governorship as a "champion" of the "New Deal" brought to fruition by Roosevelt. After the election it became clear that Martin did not support the President or his "New Deal" and this sparked a war between the Democratic state legislature and Martin. He received most of his troubles from the Democrats and gained support from Republicans. Martin was all but kicked out of the Democratic Party as many of his former supporters stated that they would no longer support him if he ran for governorship again. Despite this Martin declared that he would run again for governor because of promised support from Republicans. Martin lost his reelection bid in the primary to Democrat State Senator Henry Hess. This ended up splitting the party once again and Hess lost the general election for governor. Martin endorsed many Republicans that ran against incumbent Democrats, leading to the loss of majority in both the State House and Senate, plus the loss of the Third Congressional district.

=== Post World War II rebuilding of the party ===
The current logo of the Democratic Party of Oregon

After the war, there was no trace of a Democratic Party anywhere in Oregon, so a reorganization effort was started. The biggest triumph in the initial rebuilding was when Monroe Sweetland ran as a candidate for National Committeeman, and then won the seat in the 1948 primaries. Sweetland sought to gain connections to the Harry S. Truman administration and eventually succeeded in his goal. This resulted in the now upstart Democratic presence in Oregon receiving monetary contributions from Democratic figures. This was the one real success in the 1948 election however as the Democrats in the state failed to come up with viable strong candidates for office. Once Sweetland saw this, he decided to launch strong campaigns for Truman in the state, that also was unsuccessful as Dewey carried the state, but not the presidency. They did however elect some Democrats to smaller positions in the state legislature. There was no apparent hope for the Democrats until the following election year 1950, when Democrats saw an increase and surpassing of Democratic registration over the Republicans. The 1950 election was as big a disaster as the 1948 election as the Democrats still won no prominent seats in the state, but in 1952 the Democrats ended up seizing the Attorney General Position from the Republicans, which was seen as a major victory for the Democrats of the state. 1954 was the first time in a long time that Democrats had a sound hold on Oregon Politics, they saw an increase in State Legislature seats, increasing from 11 to 25 and in the Senate increasing from 4 to 6. They also won the first US Senatorial election in 40 years when Richard Neuberger defeated Republican incumbent Guy Cordon, and Edith Green captured Third Congressional District in an open-seat race against future governor Tom McCall. Finally, in 1956 it was clear that the Democrats were back in power when they took 3 of 4 races for US Representative, a reelection of the Attorney General, a gain of control over the State Legislature, and a victory for Governor of Oregon.

== Recent elections ==
=== 2006 elections ===
Going into the 2006 elections, Democrats occupied all four of the state's partisan executive offices and held a majority in the Oregon State Senate, but were in the minority in the Oregon House of Representatives. Of the statewide office-holders, only Governor Ted Kulongoski was up for re-election. Not only was he successful in that bid, but Democrats were elected to a slim majority in the House. All four of Oregon's Democratic United States House representatives were re-elected.

=== 2008 elections ===
In the 2008 elections, Democrats gained a three-fifths majority in the state house and maintained the same majority in the senate despite losing a seat to the Republicans. This majority in both chambers of the Oregon Legislative Assembly is needed to pass bills that raise revenue, as required by Article IV §25 of the state constitution. Democrats maintained control of all state partisan executive offices. They held all four of Oregon's five federal congressional seats, including a retiring Democrat's seat, and unseated Oregon's Republican senator, the only one from the West Coast and the only Republican occupying an office representing the whole of Oregon.

=== 2010 elections ===
In 2010 the Democrats kept the Governorship in a close election decided by the slimmest of margins. Former 2-term governor John Kitzhaber defeated Republican Chris Dudley by a mere 14,910 votes. US Senator Ron Wyden kept his senate seat, handily beating Jim Huffman 57% to 39%. The Democratic Party of Oregon also kept all four of their previously held congressional seats in the U.S House of Representatives

== Election results ==
=== Federal ===
==== Presidential ====
Oregon Democratic Party presidential election results
Election	Presidential ticket	Votes	Vote %	Electoral votes	Result
1860	Stephen A. Douglas/Herschel V. Johnson	4,131	27.99%	0 / 3	Lost
1864	George B. McClellan/George H. Pendleton	8,457	46.10%	0 / 3	Lost
1868	Horatio Seymour/Francis Preston Blair Jr.	11,125	50.37%	3 / 3	Lost
1872	Horace Greeley/Benjamin G. Brown (Liberal Republican)	7,742	38.43%	0 / 3	Lost
1876	Samuel J. Tilden/Thomas A. Hendricks	14,157	47.38%	0 / 3	Lost
1880	Winfield S. Hancock/William H. English	19,955	48.88%	0 / 3	Lost
1884	Grover Cleveland/Thomas A. Hendricks	24,604	46.70%	0 / 3	Won
1888	Grover Cleveland/Allen G. Thurman	26,522	42.88%	0 / 3	Lost
1892	Grover Cleveland/Adlai E. Stevenson	14,243	18.15%	0 / 4	Won
1896	William Jennings Bryan/Arthur Sewall	46,739	47.98%	0 / 4	Lost
1900	William Jennings Bryan/Adlai E. Stevenson	32,810	39.41%	0 / 4	Lost
1904	Alton B. Parker/Henry G. Davis	17,521	19.43%	0 / 4	Lost
1908	William Jennings Bryan/John W. Kern	38,049	34.31%	0 / 4	Lost
1912	Woodrow Wilson/Thomas R. Marshall	47,064	34.34%	5 / 5	Won
1916	Woodrow Wilson/Thomas R. Marshall	120,087	45.90%	0 / 5	Won
1920	James M. Cox/Franklin D. Roosevelt	80,019	33.55%	0 / 5	Lost
1924	John W. Davis/Charles W. Bryan	67,589	24.18%	0 / 5	Lost
1928	Al Smith/Joseph T. Robinson	109,223	34.14%	0 / 5	Lost
1932	Franklin D. Roosevelt/John N. Garner	213,871	57.99%	5 / 5	Won
1936	Franklin D. Roosevelt/John N. Garner	266,733	64.42%	5 / 5	Won
1940	Franklin D. Roosevelt/Henry A. Wallace	258,415	53.70%	5 / 5	Won
1944	Franklin D. Roosevelt/Harry S. Truman	248,635	51.78%	6 / 6	Won
1948	Harry S. Truman/Alben W. Barkley	243,147	46.40%	0 / 6	Won
1952	Adlai Stevenson/John Sparkman	270,579	38.93%	0 / 6	Lost
1956	Adlai Stevenson/Estes Kefauver	329,204	44.72%	0 / 6	Lost
1960	John F. Kennedy/Lyndon B. Johnson	367,402	47.32%	0 / 6	Won
1964	Lyndon B. Johnson/Hubert Humphrey	501,017	63.72%	6 / 6	Won
1968	Hubert Humphrey/Edmund Muskie	358,866	43.78%	0 / 6	Lost
1972	George McGovern/Sargent Shriver	392,760	42.33%	0 / 6	Lost
1976	Jimmy Carter/Walter Mondale	490,407	47.62%	0 / 6	Won
1980	Jimmy Carter/Walter Mondale	456,890	38.67%	0 / 6	Lost
1984	Walter Mondale/Geraldine Ferraro	536,479	43.74%	0 / 7	Lost
1988	Michael Dukakis/Lloyd Bentsen	616,206	51.28%	7 / 7	Lost
1992	Bill Clinton/Al Gore	621,314	42.48%	7 / 7	Won
1996	Bill Clinton/Al Gore	649,641	47.15%	7 / 7	Won
2000	Al Gore/Joe Lieberman	720,342	46.96%	7 / 7	Lost
2004	John Kerry/John Edwards	943,163	51.35%	7 / 7	Lost
2008	Barack Obama/Joe Biden	1,037,291	56.75%	7 / 7	Won
2012	Barack Obama/Joe Biden	970,488	54.24%	7 / 7	Won
2016	Hillary Clinton/Tim Kaine	1,002,106	50.07%	7 / 7	Lost
2020	Joe Biden/Kamala Harris	1,340,383	56.45%	7 / 7	Won
2024	Kamala Harris/Tim Walz	1,240,600	55.27%	8 / 8	Lost

==== U.S. Senate ====
Class 2
Year	Candidate	Votes	%	Result
1984	Margie Hendriksen	406,122	33.43%	Lost ✗
1990	Harry Lonsdale	507,743	46.19%	Lost ✗
1996	Tom Bruggere	624,370	45.90%	Lost ✗
2002	Bill Bradbury	501,898	39.61%	Lost ✗
2008	Jeff Merkley	864,392	48.90%	Won ✓
2014	Jeff Merkley	814,537	55.73%	Won ✓
2020	Jeff Merkley	1,321,047	56.91%	Won ✓
2026	Jeff Merkley	1,138,894	58.1%	Won ✓

Class 3
Year	Candidate	Votes	%	Result
1986	Rick Bauman	375,735	36.04%	Lost ✗
1992	Les AuCoin	639,851	46.50%	Lost ✗
1996 (sp.)	Ron Wyden	571,739	41.78%	Won ✓
1998	Ron Wyden	682,425	61.05%	Won ✓
2004	Ron Wyden	1,128,728	63.39%	Won ✓
2010	Ron Wyden	825,507	57.22%	Won ✓
2016	Ron Wyden	1,105,119	56.60%	Won ✓
2022	Ron Wyden	1,076,424	55.83%	Won ✓

==== U.S. House ====
Election	Votes	%	Seats (OR)	±	%
2016	1,026,851	53.71	4 / 5	0	0.07
2018	1,061,412	57.54	4 / 5	0	3.74
2020	1,285,339	56.69	4 / 5	0	1.76
2022	1,012,725	53.11	4 / 6	▼1	2.58
2024	1,151,394	58.38	5 / 6	▲1	0.27
2026	1,099,604	58.54	5 / 6	0	5.16

=== State ===
==== Executive offices ====
Governor
Election	Candidate	Votes	%	Result
1858	John Whiteaker	5,134	54.93%	Won ✓
1862	John F. Miller	3,450	32.89%	Lost ✗
1866	James K. Kelly	10,039	49.32%	Lost ✗
1870	La Fayette Grover	11,726	51.38%	Won ✓
1874	La Fayette Grover	9,713	38.23%	Won ✓
1878	William Wallace Thayer	15,689	47.93%	Won ✓
1882	Joseph Showalter Smith	20,029	48.25%	Lost ✗
1886	Sylvester Pennoyer	27,901	50.89%	Won ✓
1890	Sylvester Pennoyer	41,139	53.55%	Won ✓
1894	William Galloway	17,865	20.51%	Lost ✗
1898	W. R. King	34,452	40.77%	Lost ✗
1902	George Earle Chamberlain	41,857	46.17%	Won ✓
1906	George Earle Chamberlain	46,002	47.56%	Won ✓
1910	Oswald West	54,853	46.61%	Won ✓
1914	C. J. Smith	94,594	38.14%	Lost ✗
1918	Walter M. Pierce	65,440	42.78%	Lost ✗
1922	Walter M. Pierce	133,392	57.26%	Won ✓
1926	Walter M. Pierce	93,470	41.37%	Lost ✗
1930	Edward F. Bailey	62,434	25.10%	Lost ✗
1934	Charles H. Martin	116,677	38.57%	Won ✓
1938	Henry L. Hess	158,744	42.57%	Lost ✗
1942	Lew Wallace	62,561	22.13%	Lost ✗
1946	Carl C. Donaugh	106,474	30.94%	Lost ✗
1948 (special)	Lew Wallace	226,958	44.53%	Lost ✗
1950	Austin F. Flegel	171,750	33.95%	Lost ✗
1954	Joseph K. Carson	244,170	43.09%	Lost ✗
1956 (special)	Robert D. Holmes	369,439	50.52%	Won ✓
1958	Robert D. Holmes	267,934	44.66%	Lost ✗
1962	Robert Y. Thornton	265,359	41.63%	Lost ✗
1966	Robert W. Straub	305,008	44.67%	Lost ✗
1970	Robert W. Straub	293,892	44.10%	Lost ✗
1974	Robert W. Straub	444,812	57.73%	Won ✓
1978	Robert W. Straub	409,411	45.10%	Lost ✗
1982	Ted Kulongoski	374,316	35.92%	Lost ✗
1986	Neil Goldschmidt	549,456	51.85%	Won ✓
1990	Barbara Roberts	508,749	45.7%	Won ✓
1994	John Kitzhaber	622,083	50.95%	Won ✓
1998	John Kitzhaber	717,061	64.42%	Won ✓
2002	Ted Kulongoski	618,004	49.03%	Won ✓
2006	Ted Kulongoski	699,786	50.73%	Won ✓
2010	John Kitzhaber	716,525	49.29%	Won ✓
2014	John Kitzhaber	733,230	49.89%	Won ✓
2016 (special)	Kate Brown	985,027	50.62%	Won ✓
2018	Kate Brown	934,498	50.05%	Won ✓
2022	Tina Kotek	917,074	47.0%	Won ✓
2026	Tina Kotek	1,051,936	53.3%	Won ✓

Attorney General
Election	Candidate	Votes	Vote %	Result
2012	Ellen Rosenblum	917,627	56.17%	Won ✓
2016	Ellen Rosenblum	1,011,761	55%	Won ✓
2020	Ellen Rosenblum	1,264,716	55.97%	Won ✓
2024	Dan Rayfield	1,156,489	54.37%	Won ✓

Secretary of State
Election	Candidate	Votes	%	Result
2012	Kate Brown	863,656	51.28%	Won ✓
2016	Brad Avakian	814,089	43.21%	Lost ✗
2020	Shemia Fagan	1,146,370	50.31%	Won ✓
2024	Tobias Read	1,166,447	54.55%	Won ✓

State Treasurer
Election	Candidate	Votes	%	Result
2012	Ted Wheeler	955,213	57.83%	Won ✓
2016	Tobias Read	828,354	44.11%	Won ✓
2020	Tobias Read	1,166,703	51.68%	Won ✓
2024	Elizabeth Steiner	1,050,119	49.36%	Won ✓

== See also ==
- List of political parties in Oregon
