= 1950 United States gubernatorial elections =

- November 7, 1950; September 11, 1950 (ME)

33 governorships
	Majority party	Minority party
Party	Republican	Democratic
Seats before	19	29
Seats after	25	23
Seat change	▲6	▼6
Seats up	16	17
Seats won	22	11
- Democratic hold Republican hold Republican gain No election

United States gubernatorial elections were held in 1950, in 33 states, concurrent with the House and Senate elections, on November 7, 1950. Elections took place on September 11 in Maine.

In Connecticut, the governor was elected to a 4-year term for the first time, instead of a 2-year term.

== Race summary ==
State	Governor	Party	First elected	Status	Candidates
Alabama	Jim Folsom	Democratic	1946	Incumbent term-limited. Democratic hold.	▌ ✓ Gordon Persons (Democratic) 91.1%; ▌ John S. Crowder (Republican) 8.9%
Arizona	Dan Edward Garvey	Democratic	1948 (Note: Garvey became governor on May 25, 1948, after predecessor (Sidney Preston Osborn died.))	Incumbent lost renomination. Republican gain.	▌ ✓ J. Howard Pyle (Republican) 50.8%; ▌ Ana Frohmiller (Democratic) 49.2%
Arkansas	Sid McMath	Democratic	1948	Incumbent re-elected.	▌ ✓ Sid McMath (Democratic) 84.1%; ▌ Jefferson W. Speck (Republican) 15.9%
California	Earl Warren	Republican	1942	Incumbent re-elected.	▌ ✓ Earl Warren (Republican) 64.9%; ▌ James Roosevelt (Democratic) 35.1%
Colorado	Walter Walford Johnson	Democratic	1950 (Note: Johnson became governor on April 15, 1950, after predecessor (William Lee Knous) resigned.)	Incumbent lost re-election. Republican gain.	▌ ✓ Daniel I. J. Thornton (Republican) 52.4%; ▌ Walter Walford Johnson (Democratic) 47.2%; ▌ Louis K. Stephens (Socialist Labor) 0.3%
Connecticut	Chester Bowles	Democratic	1948	Incumbent lost re-election. Republican gain.	▌ ✓ John Davis Lodge (Republican) 49.7%; ▌Chester Bowles (Democratic) 47.7%; ▌Jasper McLevy (Socialist) 2.6%
Georgia	Herman Talmadge	Democratic	1948	Incumbent re-elected.	Primary results: ▌ ✓ Herman Talmadge (Democratic) 49.33% (295); ▌ Melvin E. Thompson (Democratic) 47.88% (115); ▌ C.O. Baker (Democratic) 1.7%; ▌ Pat Avery (Democratic) 0.5%; ▌ Mrs. J.W. Jenkins (Democratic) 0.5%; General election: ▌ Herman Talmadge (Democratic) 98.4%; ▌ Morgan Blake (Independent) 1.4%
Idaho	C. A. Robins	Republican	1946	Incumbent term-limited. Republican hold.	▌ ✓ Len Jordan (Republican) 52.6%; ▌ Calvin E. Wright (Democratic) 47.4%
Iowa	William S. Beardsley	Republican	1948	Incumbent re-elected.	▌ ✓ William S. Beardsley (Republican) 59.1%; ▌ Lester S. Gillette (Democratic) 40.5%; ▌W. Raymond Picken (Prohibition) 0.33%; ▌ Howard H. Tyler (States Rights) 0.07%
Kansas	Frank Carlson	Republican	1946	Incumbent retired. Republican hold.	▌ ✓ Edward F. Arn (Republican) 53.8%; ▌ Kenneth Anderson (Democratic) 44.5%; ▌ C. Floyd Hester (Prohibition) 1.5%; ▌ W.W. Tamplin (Socialist) 0.2%
Maine	Frederick G. Payne	Republican	1948	Incumbent re-elected.	▌ ✓ Frederick G. Payne (Republican) 60.5%; ▌ Earl S. Grant (Democratic) 39.1%; ▌ Leland B. Currier (States Rights) 0.4%
Maryland	William Preston Lane Jr.	Democratic	1946	Incumbent lost re-election. Republican gain.	▌ ✓ Theodore McKeldin (Republican) 57.3%; ▌William Preston Lane Jr. (Democratic) 42.7%
Massachusetts	Paul A. Dever	Democratic	1948	Incumbent re-elected.	▌ ✓ Paul A. Dever (Democratic) 56.3%; ▌ Arthur W. Coolidge (Republican) 43.1%; ▌Horace I. Hillis (Socialist Labor) 0.4%; ▌Mark R. Shaw (Prohibition) 0.2%
Michigan	G. Mennen Williams	Democratic	1948	Incumbent re-elected.	▌ ✓ G. Mennen Williams (Democratic) 49.76%; ▌ Harry Kelly (Republican) 49.70%; ▌Perry Hayden (Prohibition) 0.45%; ▌Theos A. Grove (Socialist Labor) 0.06%; ▌Howard Lerner (Socialist Workers) 0.03%
Minnesota	Luther Youngdahl	Republican	1946	Incumbent re-elected.	▌ ✓ Luther Youngdahl (Republican) 60.8%; ▌ Harry H. Peterson (DFL) 38.3%; ▌Vernon G. Campbell (Industrial Government) 0.97%
Nebraska	Val Peterson	Republican	1946	Incumbent re-elected.	▌ ✓ Val Peterson (Republican) 55.0%; ▌ Walter R. Raecke (Democratic) 45.0%
Nevada	Vail Pittman	Democratic	1945 (Note: Pittman became governor in 1945 when predecessor (Edward P. Carville) resigned. He was subsequently re-elected in 1946.)	Incumbent lost re-election. Republican gain.	▌ ✓ Charles H. Russell (Republican) 57.7%; ▌ ✓ Vail Pittman (Democratic) 42.4%
New Hampshire	Sherman Adams	Republican	1948	Incumbent re-elected.	▌ ✓ Sherman Adams (Republican) 57.0%; ▌ Robert P. Bingham (Democratic) 43.0%
New Mexico	Thomas J. Mabry	Democratic	1946	Incumbent term-limited. Republican gain.	▌ ✓ Edwin L. Mechem (Republican) 53.7%; ▌ John E. Miles (Democratic) 46.3%
New York	Thomas E. Dewey	Republican	1942	Incumbent re-elected.	▌ ✓ Thomas E. Dewey (Republican) 53.1%; ▌ Walter A. Lynch (Democratic) 42.3%; ▌ John T. McManus (American Labor) 4.2%; ▌ Michael Bartell (Socialist Workers) 0.3%; ▌ Eric Hass (Socialist Labor) 0.1%
North Dakota	Fred G. Aandahl	Republican	1944	Incumbent retired. Republican hold.	▌ ✓ Norman Brunsdale (Republican) 66.3%; ▌ Clyde G. Byerly (Democratic) 33.7%
Ohio	Frank Lausche	Democratic	1944; 1946 (lost); 1948	Incumbent re-elected.	▌ ✓ Frank Lausche (Democratic) 52.6%; ▌ Don H. Ebright (Republican) 47.4%
Oklahoma	Roy J. Turner	Democratic	1942	Incumbent term-limited. Democratic hold.	▌ ✓ Johnston Murray (Democratic) 51.1%; ▌ Jo O. Ferguson (Republican) 48.6%; ▌ Mildred Harrell (Independent) 0.3%
Oregon	Douglas McKay	Republican	1948	Incumbent re-elected.	▌ ✓ Douglas McKay (Republican) 66.1%; ▌ Austin F. Flegel (Democratic) 34.0%
Pennsylvania	James H. Duff	Republican	1946	Incumbent term-limited. Republican hold.	▌ ✓ John S. Fine (Republican) 50.7%; ▌ Richardson Dilworth (Democratic) 48.3%; ▌ Richard R. Blews (Prohibition) 0.4%; ▌ Reginald B. Naugle (GIs Against Communism) 0.2%; ▌ Thomas J. Fizpatrick (Progressive) 0.2%; ▌ Robert Z. Wilson Mozer (Socialist) 0.1%; ▌ George S. Taylor (Industrial Government) 0.1%
Rhode Island	John Pastore	Democratic	1945 (Note: Pastore became governor in 1945 after predecessor (J. Howard McGrath) resigned.)	Incumbent retired. Democratic hold.	▌ ✓ Dennis J. Roberts (Democratic) 59.3%; ▌ Eugene J. Lachapelle (Republican) 40.7%
South Carolina	Strom Thurmond	Democratic	1946	Incumbent term-limited. Democratic hold.	Primary run-off: ▌ ✓ James F. Byrnes (Democratic) 71.63%; ▌ Lester L. Bates (Democratic) 18.23%; ▌ Thomas H. Pope (Democratic) 8.55%; ▌ Marcus A. Stone (Democratic) 1.59%; General election: ▌ James F. Byrnes (Democratic) 100.0%
South Dakota	George T. Mickelson	Republican	1946	Incumbent term-limited. Republican hold.	▌ ✓ Sigurd Anderson (Republican) 60.9%; ▌ Joe Robbie (Democratic) 39.1%
Tennessee	Gordon Browning	Democratic	1948	Incumbent re-elected.	▌ ✓ Gordon Browning (Democratic) 78.1%; ▌ John Randolph Neal Jr. (Independent) 21.9%
Texas	Allan Shivers	Democratic	1949 (Note: Shivers became governor in 1949 when predecessor (Beauford H. Jester) died.)	Incumbent re-elected.	▌ ✓ Allan Shivers (Democratic) 89.9%; ▌ Ralph W. Currie (Republican) 10.1%
Vermont	Harold J. Arthur	Republican	1950 (Note: Arthur became governor on January 16, 1950, when predecessor (Ernest W. Gibson Jr.) resigned.)	Incumbent retired. Republican hold.	▌ ✓ Lee E. Emerson (Republican) 74.5%; ▌ J. Edward Moran (Democratic) 25.5%
Wisconsin	Oscar Rennebohm	Republican	1947 (Note: Rennebohm became governor in 1947 after predecessor (Walter Samuel Goodland died.)	Incumbent retired. Republican hold.	▌ ✓ Walter J. Kohler Jr. (Republican) 53.2%; ▌Carl W. Thompson (Democratic) 46.2%; ▌Michael Essin (Progressive) 0.3%; ▌William O. Hart (Socialist) 0.3%
Wyoming	Arthur G. Crane	Republican	1949 (Note: Crane became governor in 1949 when predecessor (Lester C. Hunt) resigned.)	Incumbent retired. Republican hold.	▌ ✓ Frank A. Barrett (Republican) 56.2%; ▌ John J. McIntyre (Democratic) 43.9%

== Closest races ==
States where the margin of victory was under 5%:

1. Michigan, 0.06%
2. Arizona, 1.54%
3. Connecticut, 1.93%
4. Pennsylvania, 2.43%
5. Oklahoma, 2.50%

States where the margin of victory was under 10%:

1. Idaho, 5.12%
2. Colorado, 5.21%
3. Ohio, 5.24%
4. Wisconsin, 7.05%
5. Kansas, 9.29%
6. New Mexico, 9.44%
7. Nebraska, 9.88%

Red denotes states won by Republicans. Blue denotes states won by Democrats.
