= 1958 Oregon gubernatorial election =

- November 4, 1958
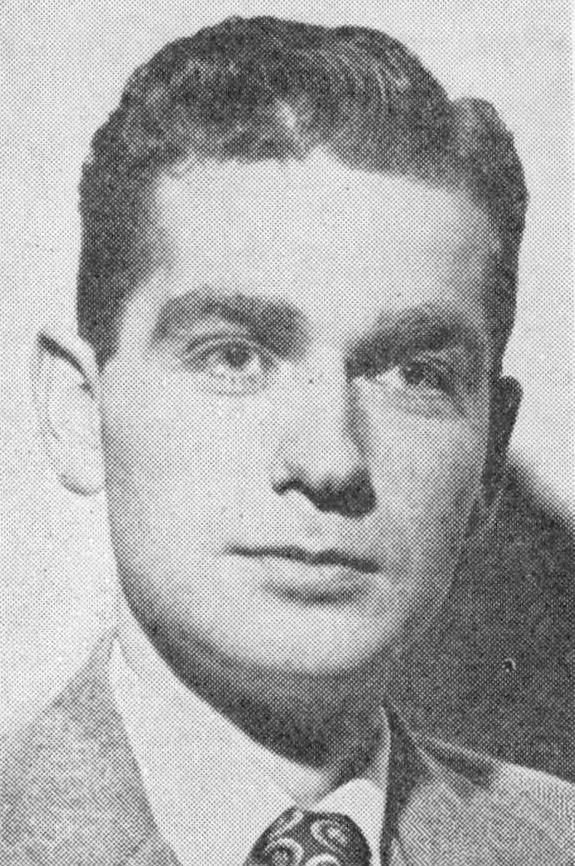

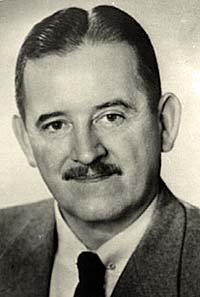
Nominee	Mark Hatfield	Robert D. Holmes
Party	Republican	Democratic
Popular vote	331,900	267,934
Percentage	55.32%	44.66%
- County results Hatfield: 50–60% 60–70% Holmes: 50–60%
Governor before election
Robert D. Holmes
Democratic
Elected Governor
Mark Hatfield
Republican

The 1958 Oregon gubernatorial election took place on November 4, 1958. Republican nominee Mark Hatfield defeated Democratic incumbent Robert D. Holmes in a landslide.

== Primary election ==
Oregon held primary elections on May 16, 1958.

=== Democratic party ===
Incumbent governor Robert D. Holmes faced a primary challenge from Lew Wallace who sought the Democratic gubernatorial nomination for a fifth time.

==== Candidates ====
- Robert D. Holmes, incumbent governor
- Lew Wallace, Democratic nominee for governor in 1942 and 1948
- Wiley W. Smith, tax assessor for Multnomah County

==== Results ====
Democratic primary results
Party	Candidate	Votes	%
Democratic	Robert D. Holmes	129,491	62.02%
Democratic	Lew Wallace	59,992	28.73%
Democratic	Wiley W. Smith	18.484	8.85%
Democratic	Scattering	827	0.40%
Total votes		208,794	100.00%

=== Republican party ===
==== Candidates ====
- Albert Eichman
- Warren Gill, member of Oregon State Senate
- Mark Hatfield, Oregon Secretary of State
- George W. Livingston
- Orval Rasor
- Sig Unander, Oregon State Treasurer

==== Results ====
Republican primary results
Party	Candidate	Votes	%
Republican	Mark Hatfield	106,687	47.88%
Republican	Sig Unander	65,180	29.25%
Republican	Warren Gill	40,489	18.17%
Republican	Albert Eichman	6,452	2.90%
Republican	George W. Livingston	2,475	1.11%
Republican	Orval Rasor	1,295	0.58%
Republican	Scattering	263	0.12%
Total votes		222,841	100.00%

== General election ==
=== Results ===
1958 Oregon gubernatorial election
Party	Candidate	Votes	%	±%
Republican	Mark Hatfield	331,900	55.32%	+5.84%
Democratic	Robert D. Holmes (inc.)	267,934	44.66%	−5.86%
Write-in	Scattering	160	0.03	
Total votes		599,994	100.00%	
Majority		63,966	10.66%	
Republican gain from Democratic		Swing	+11.70%	

=== Results by county ===
Hatfield was the first Republican governor to be elected without carrying Clatsop County. That county also broke a streak of backing the statewide winner that had begun in 1906; in the next election, Clatsop County would begin another such streak that would last until 2014. As of 2026, Benton County has voted for the winner in this and every subsequent gubernatorial election. (Note: This is the second longest active bellwether streak for gubernatorial elections. Lincoln County currently has the longest active streak, which began in 1950.)

County	Mark Hatfield Republican		Robert D. Holmes Democratic		Scattering Write-in		Margin		Total votes cast
County	#	%	#	%	#	%	#	%	Total votes cast
Baker	2,685	48.52%	2,848	51.46%	1	0.02%	-163	-2.95%	5,534
Benton	7,595	66.27%	3,865	33.73%	0	0.00%	3,730	32.55%	11,460
Clackamas	21,591	54.97%	17,666	44.98%	19	0.05%	3,925	9.99%	39,276
Clatsop	4,934	44.48%	6,156	55.49%	3	0.03%	-1,222	-11.02%	11,093
Columbia	3,699	45.46%	4,437	54.54%	0	0.00%	-738	-9.07%	8,136
Coos	6,857	43.06%	9,068	56.94%	0	0.00%	-2,211	-13.88%	15,925
Crook	1,610	53.60%	1,394	46.40%	0	0.00%	216	7.19%	3,004
Curry	1,751	50.07%	1,746	49.93%	0	0.00%	5	0.14%	3,497
Deschutes	4,560	60.59%	2,966	39.41%	0	0.00%	1,594	21.18%	7,526
Douglas	10,981	56.12%	8,586	43.88%	0	0.00%	2,395	12.24%	19,567
Gilliam	701	62.31%	424	37.69%	0	0.00%	277	24.62%	1,125
Grant	1,572	63.85%	890	36.15%	0	0.00%	682	27.70%	2,462
Harney	1,204	53.56%	1,044	46.44%	0	0.00%	160	7.12%	2,248
Hood River	2,622	57.61%	1,928	42.36%	1	0.02%	694	15.25%	4,551
Jackson	14,918	60.90%	9,575	39.09%	4	0.02%	5,343	21.81%	24,497
Jefferson	1,016	58.02%	735	41.98%	0	0.00%	281	16.05%	1,751
Josephine	6,134	64.37%	3,395	35.62%	1	0.01%	2,739	28.74%	9,530
Klamath	7,988	56.71%	6,098	43.29%	0	0.00%	1,890	13.42%	14,086
Lake	1,331	62.99%	782	37.01%	0	0.00%	549	25.98%	2,113
Lane	27,167	53.60%	23,515	46.40%	2	0.00%	3,652	7.21%	50,684
Lincoln	4,451	52.60%	4,011	47.40%	0	0.00%	440	5.20%	8,462
Linn	9,807	53.58%	8,498	46.42%	0	0.00%	1,309	7.15%	18,305
Malheur	3,807	60.37%	2,499	39.63%	0	0.00%	1,308	20.74%	6,306
Marion	24,041	60.33%	15,786	39.61%	23	0.06%	8,255	20.72%	39,850
Morrow	878	53.90%	751	46.10%	0	0.00%	127	7.80%	1,629
Multnomah	106,884	53.55%	92,640	46.41%	90	0.05%	14,244	7.14%	199,614
Polk	5,531	62.27%	3,351	37.73%	0	0.00%	2,180	24.54%	8,882
Sherman	649	68.82%	294	31.18%	0	0.00%	355	37.65%	943
Tillamook	3,740	55.61%	2,986	44.39%	0	0.00%	754	11.21%	6,726
Umatilla	7,225	51.90%	6,695	48.09%	2	0.01%	530	3.81%	13,922
Union	2,923	49.17%	3,022	50.83%	0	0.00%	-99	-1.67%	5,945
Wallowa	1,268	50.70%	1,233	49.30%	0	0.00%	35	1.40%	2,501
Wasco	3,557	55.69%	2,830	44.31%	0	0.00%	727	11.38%	6,387
Washington	18,909	61.54%	11,807	38.43%	11	0.04%	7,102	23.11%	30,727
Wheeler	456	58.84%	319	41.16%	0	0.00%	137	17.68%	775
Yamhill	6,858	62.60%	4,094	37.37%	3	0.03%	2,764	25.23%	10,955
Total	331,900	55.32%	267,934	44.66%	160	0.03%	63,966	10.66%	599,994

==== Counties that flipped from Democratic to Republican ====
- Clackamas
- Curry
- Douglas
- Lane
- Lincoln
- Linn
- Multnomah
- Tillamook
- Wallowa
- Wasco
