= Lew Wallace (Oregon politician) =

American politician

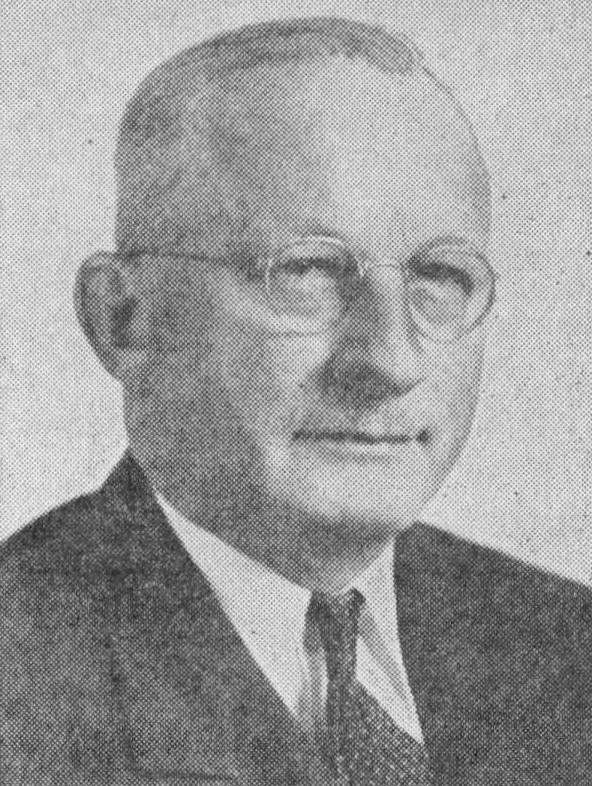

Member of the Oregon State Senate
- In office January 9, 1939 – January 10, 1949

Member of the Oregon House of Representatives
- In office January 14, 1935 – January 11, 1937

Personal details
- Born: March 27, 1889 Furnas County, Nebraska, U.S.
- Died: October 14, 1960 (aged 71) Portland, Oregon, U.S.
- Resting place: River View Cemetery, Portland, Oregon
- Party: Democratic

Lew Wallace (March 27, 1889 – October 14, 1960) was an American Democratic politician from the state of Oregon. He served in both houses of the Oregon Legislative Assembly and was a five-time gubernatorial candidate.

== Career ==
Wallace was born in 1889 in Furnas County, Nebraska. He later moved to Portland, Oregon, where he worked as an insurance agent and was elected to the Oregon House in 1934, and to the Senate in 1938. In 1942, Wallace defeated former Oregon House speaker Howard LaTourette, as well as Grover Fretwell, to win the Democratic nomination for governor. He lost in the general election to Earl Snell, receiving 22% of the vote. Snell's 56-point margin of victory was the largest ever in an Oregon gubernatorial election.

Wallace was an alternate delegate to the 1944 Democratic National Convention and was also a member of the Democratic National Committee in 1944.

In 1946, Wallace ran for the U.S. House of Representatives. He lost to incumbent Republican Homer D. Angell. Wallace again ran for governor in 1948, winning the Democratic primary but losing the general election to Douglas McKay, with 45% of the vote.

Wallace made three more runs for governor. In 1950, he lost the Democratic primary to Austin F. Flegel. In 1956, he lost the primary to Robert D. Holmes by less than 3,500 votes; Holmes went on to win the general election. In 1958, Wallace lost the primary again to the now-incumbent Holmes by a more substantial margin. He also unsuccessfully ran for mayor of Portland in 1952, finishing third place in the nonpartisan primary.

Party political offices
Preceded by Henry L. Hess	Democratic nominee for Governor of Oregon; 1942	Succeeded by Carl C. Donaugh
Preceded by Carl C. Donaugh	Democratic nominee for Governor of Oregon; 1948	Succeeded by Austin F. Flegel
