= Austin F. Flegel =

American businessman and politician

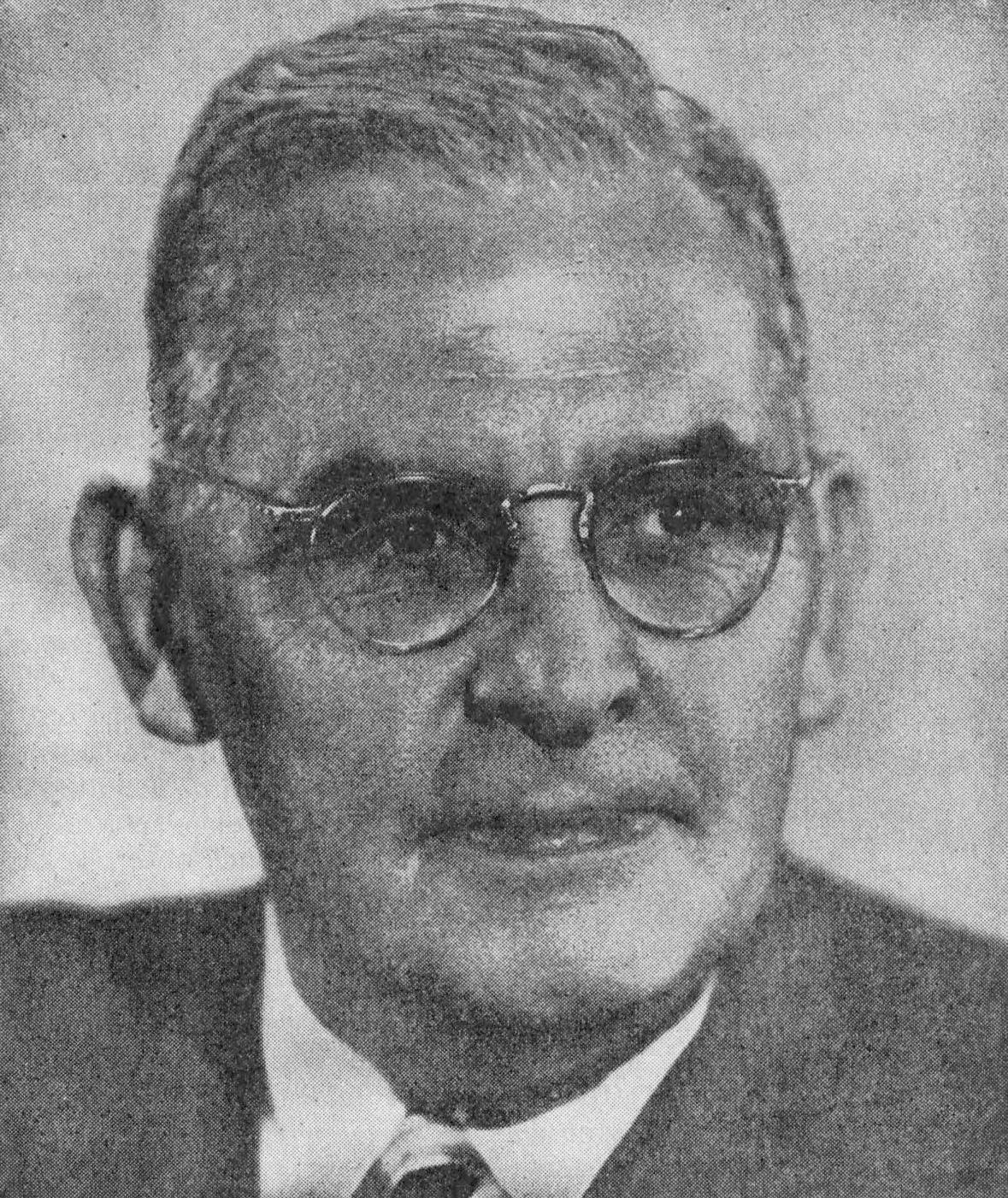

Member of the Oregon State Senate
- In office January 10, 1949 – January 8, 1951

Personal details
- Born: May 4, 1890 Portland, Oregon, U.S.
- Died: September 14, 1956 (aged 66) Portland, Oregon, U.S.
- Party: Democratic

Austin Finck Flegel Jr. (May 4, 1890 – September 14, 1956) was an American businessman and politician who was a Democratic member of the Oregon Senate from 1949 until 1951. He was the Democratic nominee in the 1950 gubernatorial election.

== Career ==
Flegel was born to Austin Finck Flegel Sr. and Dora Dawley in 1890 in Portland. He was the first of 10 children, including Arthur Dawley Flegel, who served as mayor of Roseburg.

Flegel first ran to represent Oregon's 3rd congressional district in the United States House of Representatives in 1914, losing to Clifton N. McArthur. He came in second place in a five-way race, receiving 32% of the vote. He represented parts of Portland in the Oregon Senate between 1949 and 1951. In 1950, Flegel ran for Governor of Oregon. He won a close race for the Democratic primary, defeating Walter J. Pearson, the state treasurer, and Lew Wallace, a former state senator who was also the 1942 and 1948 nominee. Flegel lost the general election to incumbent Republican Douglas McKay by a 2-to-1 margin.

Following his defeat, Flegel was appointed by President Harry S. Truman as Director of the United States Economic Mission to Thailand, serving from 1953 until 1954. He later ran for delegate to the 1956 Democratic National Convention.

He died on the night of September 14, 1956, at his home in Portland.

Party political offices
Preceded by Lew Wallace	Democratic nominee for Governor of Oregon; 1950	Succeeded by Joseph K. Carson
