= 2012 Oregon State Treasurer election =

- November 6, 2012
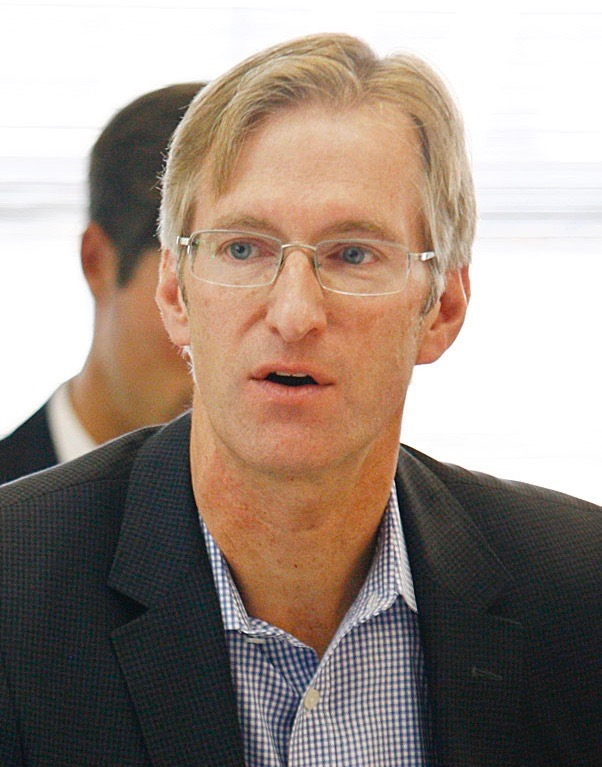

Candidate	Ted Wheeler	Thomas B. Cox
Party	Democratic	Republican
Popular vote	955,213	609,989
Percentage	57.83%	36.93%
- Wheeler: 40–50% 50–60% 60–70% 70–80% Cox: 40–50% 50–60% 60–70%
State Treasurer before election
Ted Wheeler
Democratic
Elected State Treasurer
Ted Wheeler
Democratic

The 2012 Oregon State Treasurer election was held on November 6, 2012, to elect the Oregon State Treasurer. Incumbent Democratic State Treasurer Ted Wheeler was re-elected to a full term after being appointed to the role in 2010 by Governor Ted Kulongoski due to the death of Ben Westlund and then being elected to finish the term.

== Democratic primary ==
Oregon State Treasurer Democratic primary, 2012
Party	Candidate	Votes	%
Democratic	Ted Wheeler	272,278	99.50
Democratic	Write-ins	1,365	0.49
Total votes		273,643	100

== Republican primary ==
Oregon State Treasurer Republican primary, 2012
Party	Candidate	Votes	%
Republican	Thomas B. Cox	12,885	53.19
Republican	Write-ins	11,337	46.80
Total votes		24,222	100

== Results ==
Oregon State Treasurer election, 2012
Party	Candidate	Votes	%	±%
Democratic	Ted Wheeler (incumbent)	955,213	57.83%	
Republican	Thomas Cox	609,989	36.93%	
Progressive	Cameron Whitten	38,762	2.34%	
Libertarian	John F. Mahler	30,002	1.81%	
Constitution	Michael Paul Marsh	15,415	0.93%	
Write-in		2,181	0.13%	
Total votes		1,651,562	100.00%	
Democratic hold				

=== Results by congressional districts ===
Wheeler won four of five congressional districts.

District	Wheeler	Cox	Representative
1st	60%	35%	Suzanne Bonamici
2nd	44%	50%	Greg Walden
3rd	74%	21%	Earl Blumenauer
4th	54%	40%	Peter DeFazio
5th	55%	40%	Kurt Schrader
