= 1956 United States Senate election in Oregon =

- November 7, 1956
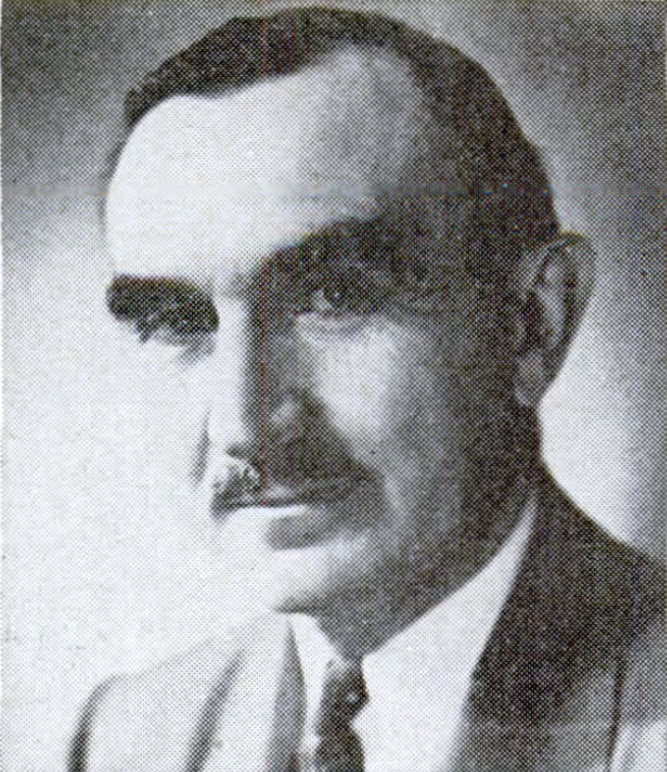

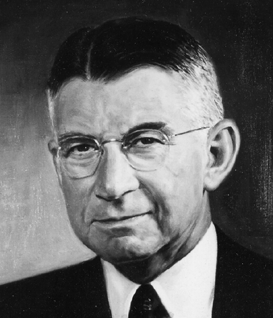
Nominee	Wayne Morse	Douglas McKay
Party	Democratic	Republican
Popular vote	396,849	335,405
Percentage	54.20%	45.80%
- County results Morse: 50–60% 60–70% McKay: 50–60%
Senator before election
Wayne Morse
Democratic
Elected Senator
Wayne Morse
Democratic

The 1956 United States Senate election in Oregon was held on November 7, 1956, to select the U.S. Senator from the state of Oregon. Republican-turned-Independent-turned Democratic Senator Wayne Morse decided to seek re-election for his first full term as a Democrat. Morse defeated Republican candidate Douglas McKay in the hotly contested general election.

== Republican primary ==
=== Candidates ===
- George Altvater
- Elmer Deetz
- Phil Hitchcock, professor, clergyman, and former State Senator from Portland
- Douglas McKay, United States Secretary of the Interior and former Governor of Oregon

=== Results ===
Results by county McKay: 40–50%; 50–60%; 60–70%; 70–80%; Hitchcock: 40–50%; 50–60%; 60–70%

Republican primary for the United States Senate from Oregon, 1956
Party	Candidate	Votes	%
Republican	Douglas McKay	123,281	49.5%
Republican	Phil Hitchcock	99,296	39.8%
Republican	Elmer Deetz	23,170	9.3%
Republican	George Altvater	3,525	1.4%
Total votes		249,272	100.00%

== General election ==
=== Candidates ===
- Wayne Morse, incumbent Senator since 1945 (Democratic)
- Douglas McKay, United States Secretary of the Interior and former Governor of Oregon (Republican)

=== Results ===
Oregon United States Senate election, 1956
Party	Candidate	Votes	%	±%
Democratic	Wayne Morse (inc.)	396,849	54.20%	
Republican	Douglas McKay	335,405	45.80%	
Majority		61,444	8.39%	
Turnout		732,254		

== See also ==
- 1956 United States Senate elections
