= 1950 Oregon gubernatorial election =

- November 7, 1950
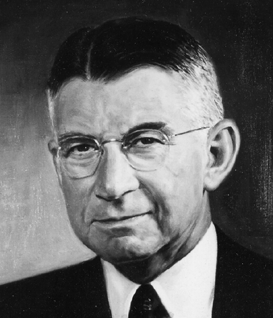

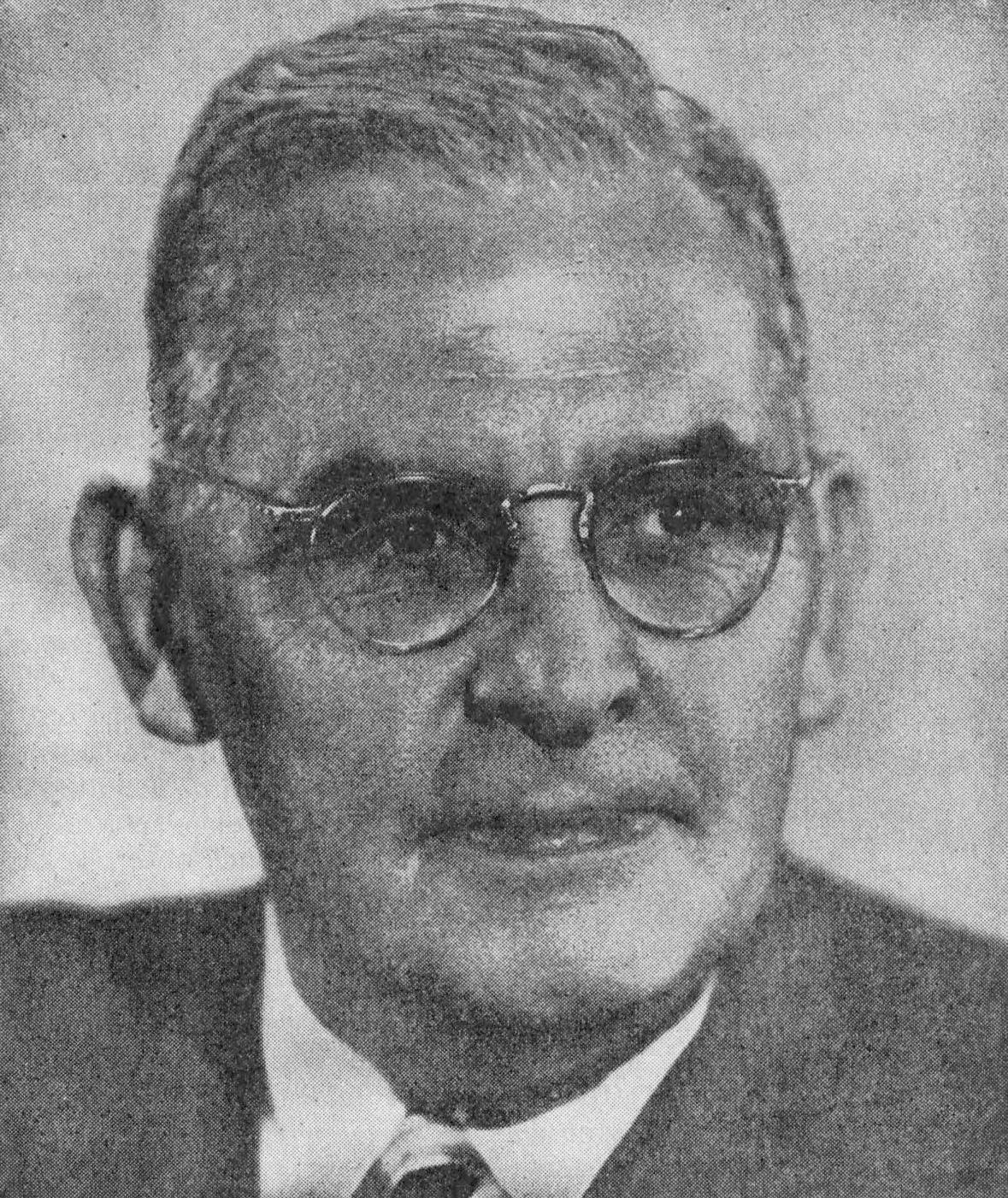
Nominee	Douglas McKay	Austin F. Flegel
Party	Republican	Democratic
Popular vote	334,160	171,750
Percentage	66.05%	33.95%
- County results McKay: 50–60% 60–70% 70–80%
Governor before election
Douglas McKay
Republican
Elected Governor
Douglas McKay
Republican

The 1950 Oregon gubernatorial election took place on November 7, 1950 to elect the governor of the U.S. state of Oregon. Incumbent Republican governor Douglas McKay defeated Democratic nominee Austin F. Flegel in a landslide, sweeping every county in the state. McKay had been elected in a 1948 gubernatorial special election to replace interim governor John Hubert Hall. Hall, as Speaker of the Oregon House of Representatives, had succeeded to the governorship following the death of governor Earl Snell, Oregon Secretary of State Robert S. Farrell, Jr., and State Senate President Marshall E. Cornett in a plane crash on October 30, 1947. McKay thus sought and won reelection to a full term in 1950. McKay would step down less than two years into his term to become United States Secretary of the Interior under President Dwight Eisenhower.

== Primary election ==
Oregon held primary elections on May 19, 1950.

=== Republican party ===
Incumbent governor Douglas McKay was renominated without opposition.

==== Candidates ====
- Douglas McKay, incumbent governor

==== Results ====
Republican primary results
Party	Candidate	Votes	%
Republican	Douglas McKay (inc.)	180,564	99.84%
Republican	Scattering	281	0.16%
Total votes		180,845	100.00%

=== Democratic party ===
Portland attorney and state senator Austin F. Flegel narrowly defeated Oregon State Treasurer Walter J. Pearson and former state senator and 1942 and 1948 Democratic gubernatorial nominee Lew Wallace in a three-way race.

==== Candidates ====
- Austin F. Flegel, member of Oregon State Senate
- Walter J. Pearson, Oregon State Treasurer
- Lew Wallace, former member of Oregon State Senate

==== Results ====
Democratic primary results
Party	Candidate	Votes	%
Democratic	Austin F. Flegel	59,417	36.24%
Democratic	Lew Wallace	57,730	35.21%
Democratic	Walter J. Pearson	46,549	28.39%
Democratic	Scattering	261	0.16%
Total votes		163,957	100.00%

== General election ==
=== Results ===
1950 Oregon gubernatorial election
Party	Candidate	Votes	%	±%
Republican	Douglas McKay (inc.)	334,160	66.05%	+12.82%
Democratic	Austin F. Flegel	171,750	33.95%	−10.58%
Total votes		505,910	100.00%	
Majority		162,410	32.10%	
Republican hold		Swing	+23.40%	

=== Results by county ===
County	Douglas McKay Republican		Austin F. Flegel Democratic		Margin		Total votes cast
County	#	%	#	%	#	%	Total votes cast
Baker	3,848	64.61%	2,108	35.39%	1,740	29.21%	5,956
Benton	7,104	77.36%	2,079	22.64%	5,025	54.72%	9,183
Clackamas	19,574	66.17%	10,008	33.83%	9,566	32.34%	29,582
Clatsop	6,683	65.71%	3,487	34.29%	3,196	31.43%	10,170
Columbia	4,349	56.31%	3,375	43.69%	974	12.61%	7,724
Coos	6,944	63.01%	4,077	36.99%	2,867	26.01%	11,021
Crook	1,567	66.40%	793	33.60%	774	32.80%	2,360
Curry	1,337	69.31%	592	30.69%	745	38.62%	1,929
Deschutes	4,377	65.49%	2,306	34.51%	2,071	30.99%	6,683
Douglas	9,876	66.58%	4,958	33.42%	4,918	33.15%	14,834
Gilliam	698	71.08%	284	28.92%	414	42.16%	982
Grant	1,600	68.52%	735	31.48%	865	37.04%	2,335
Harney	1,114	63.69%	635	36.31%	479	27.39%	1,749
Hood River	2,844	70.24%	1,205	29.76%	1,639	40.48%	4,049
Jackson	12,835	66.58%	6,442	33.42%	6,393	33.16%	19,277
Jefferson	1,040	70.84%	428	29.16%	612	41.69%	1,468
Josephine	5,527	67.10%	2,710	32.90%	2,817	34.20%	8,237
Klamath	7,850	58.22%	5,634	41.78%	2,216	16.43%	13,484
Lake	1,367	71.31%	550	28.69%	817	42.62%	1,917
Lane	24,924	67.30%	12,112	32.70%	12,812	34.59%	37,036
Lincoln	4,857	67.41%	2,348	32.59%	2,509	34.82%	7,205
Linn	10,006	64.25%	5,568	35.75%	4,438	28.50%	15,574
Malheur	3,957	72.57%	1,496	27.43%	2,461	45.13%	5,453
Marion	21,478	66.80%	10,677	33.20%	10,801	33.59%	32,155
Morrow	1,072	74.76%	362	25.24%	710	49.51%	1,434
Multnomah	116,154	65.03%	62,470	34.97%	53,684	30.05%	178,624
Polk	5,063	66.44%	2,557	33.56%	2,506	32.89%	7,620
Sherman	710	78.63%	193	21.37%	517	57.25%	903
Tillamook	4,520	66.85%	2,241	33.15%	2,279	33.71%	6,761
Umatilla	7,839	65.66%	4,100	34.34%	3,739	31.32%	11,939
Union	3,913	60.11%	2,597	39.89%	1,316	20.22%	6,510
Wallowa	1,582	66.55%	795	33.45%	787	33.11%	2,377
Wasco	3,736	70.85%	1,537	29.15%	2,199	41.70%	5,273
Washington	14,791	69.42%	6,516	30.58%	8,275	38.84%	21,307
Wheeler	494	65.95%	255	34.05%	239	31.91%	749
Yamhill	8,530	70.79%	3,520	29.21%	5,010	41.58%	12,050
Total	334,160	66.05%	171,750	33.95%	162,410	32.10%	505,910

==== Counties that flipped from Democratic to Republican ====
- Columbia
- Coos
- Lincoln
- Multnomah
- Union
