= 1858 Oregon gubernatorial election =

- June 7, 1858
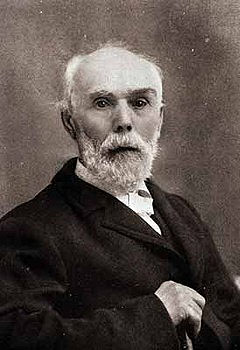

Nominee	John Whiteaker	E. M. Barnum
Party	Democratic	Democratic
Alliance		Republican
Popular vote	5,134	4,213
Percentage	54.66%	44.86%
- County results Whiteaker: 50–60% 60–70% 70–80% >90% Barnum: 50–60% 60–70%
Governor before election
George Law Curry
as Territorial Governor
Democratic
Elected Governor
John Whiteaker
Democratic

The 1858 Oregon gubernatorial election took place on June 7, 1858, to elect the first governor in anticipation of Oregon statehood. With the state Democratic Party split into factions driven by personal rivalry and state government influence, the election matched insurgent E. M. Barnum against establishment candidate John Whiteaker, who won. The Republican Party first nominated John Denny, but he later withdrew in favor of the insurgent Democrat, whom the party hoped to win over to the Republicans.

== Results ==
1858 Oregon gubernatorial election
Party	Candidate	Votes	%
Democratic	John Whiteaker	5,134	54.66%
Democratic	E. M. Barnum	4,213	44.86%
Republican	John Denny	45	0.48%
Total votes		9,392	100.00%
Majority		921	9.81%
Democratic hold			

=== Results by county ===
County	John Whiteaker Democratic		E. M. Barnum Democratic		John Denny Republican		Margin		Total votes cast
County	#	%	#	%	#	%	#	%	Total votes cast
Benton	212	34.36%	405	65.64%	0	0.00%	-193	-31.28%	617
Clackamas	346	47.46%	383	52.54%	0	0.00%	-37	-5.08%	729
Clatsop	37	37.37%	61	61.62%	1	1.01%	-24	-24.24%	99
Columbia	55	48.25%	59	51.75%	0	0.00%	-4	-3.51%	114
Coos	84	86.60%	7	7.22%	6	6.19%	77	79.38%	97
Curry	126	94.03%	8	5.97%	0	0.00%	118	88.06%	134
Douglas	301	49.10%	307	50.08%	5	0.82%	-6	-0.98%	613
Jackson	440	50.11%	432	49.20%	6	0.68%	8	0.91%	878
Lane	481	54.72%	393	44.71%	5	0.57%	88	10.01%	879
Linn	776	76.45%	219	21.58%	20	1.97%	557	54.88%	1,015
Marion	736	64.34%	408	35.66%	0	0.00%	328	28.67%	1,144
Multnomah	398	42.57%	536	57.33%	1	0.11%	-138	-14.76%	935
Polk	359	58.09%	259	41.91%	0	0.00%	100	16.18%	618
Tillamook	16	84.21%	3	15.79%	0	0.00%	13	68.42%	19
Umpqua	108	53.73%	93	46.27%	0	0.00%	15	7.46%	201
Wasco	212	92.98%	16	7.02%	0	0.00%	196	85.96%	228
Washington	188	47.72%	205	52.28%	0	0.00%	-18	-4.57%	394
Yamhill	259	38.20%	418	61.65%	1	0.15%	-159	-23.45%	678
Total	5,134	54.66%	4,213	44.86%	45	0.48%	921	9.81%	9,392
