= 1874 Oregon gubernatorial election =

- June 1, 1874
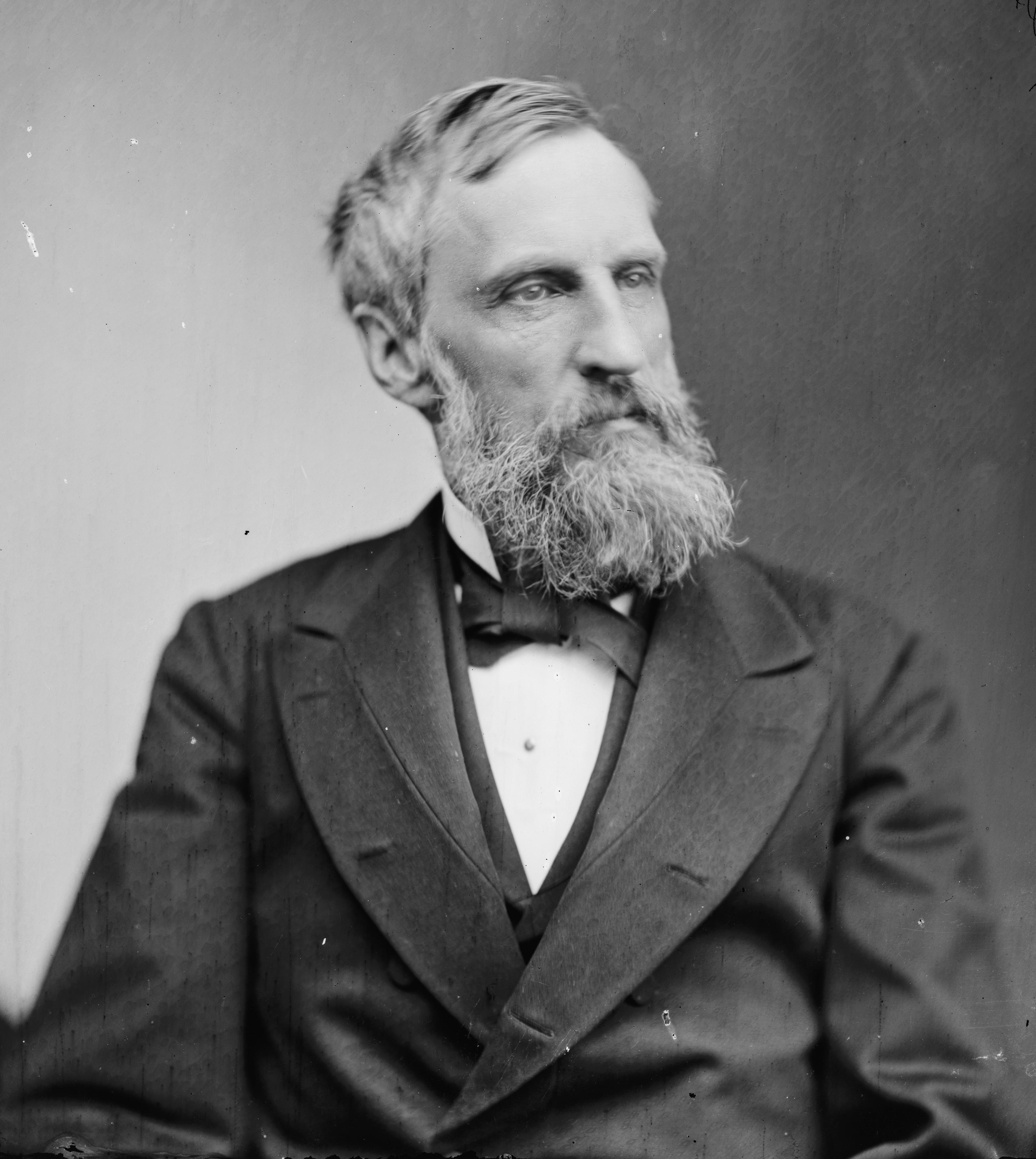

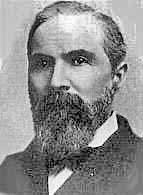
Nominee	La Fayette Grover	J. C. Tolman	Thomas F. Campbell
Party	Democratic	Republican	Independent
Popular vote	9,713	9,163	6,532
Percentage	38.23%	36.06%	25.71%
- County results Grover: 30–40% 40–50% 50–60% Tolman: 30–40% 40–50% 50–60% 60–70% Campbell: 30–40% 40–50%
Governor before election
La Fayette Grover
Democratic
Elected Governor
La Fayette Grover
Democratic

The 1874 Oregon gubernatorial election took place on June 1, 1874, to elect the governor of the U.S. state of Oregon. The election matched Republican J. C. Tolman against Democratic incumbent La Fayette Grover and independent Thomas Franklin Campbell. Grover narrowly won reelection in a three-way race; his 38.23% share of the vote is the lowest for any winning gubernatorial candidate in Oregon.

== Results ==
1874 Oregon gubernatorial election
Party	Candidate	Votes	%	±%
Democratic	La Fayette Grover (incumbent)	9,713	38.23%	−13.15%
Republican	J. C. Tolman	9,163	36.06%	−12.56%
Independent	Thomas F. Campbell	6,532	25.71%	
Write-in	Scattering	1	0.00%	
Total votes		25,409	100.00%	
Plurality		550	2.16%	
Democratic hold		Swing	-0.60%	

=== Results by county ===
County	La Fayette Grover Democratic		J. C. Tolman Republican		Thomas F. Campbell Independent		Margin		Total votes cast
County	#	%	#	%	#	%	#	%	Total votes cast
Baker	478	56.30%	295	35.10%	73	8.60%	180	21.20%	849
Benton	276	24.02%	481	41.86%	392	34.12%	-89 (Note: Tolman's margin over Campbell)	-7.74%	1,149
Clackamas	640	44.69%	593	41.41%	199	13.90%	47	3.28%	1,432
Clatsop	148	37.47%	211	53.42%	35	8.86%	-63	-15.95%	395 (Note: Includes 1 Scattering vote)
Columbia	114	43.68%	59	22.61%	88	33.72%	26 (Note: Grover's margin over Campbell)	9.96%	261
Coos	399	46.23%	408	47.28%	56	6.49%	-9	-1.04%	863
Curry	78	38.81%	106	52.74%	17	8.46%	-28	-13.93%	201
Douglas	503	31.34%	435	27.10%	667	41.56%	-164 (Note: Campbell's margin over Grover)	-10.22%	1,605
Grant	198	30.65%	206	31.89%	242	37.46%	-36 (Note: Campbell's margin over Tolman)	-5.57%	646
Jackson	828	54.47%	572	37.63%	120	7.89%	256	16.84%	1,520
Josephine	163	50.46%	133	41.18%	27	8.36%	30	9.29%	323
Lane	587	33.97%	619	35.82%	522	30.21%	-32	-1.85%	1,728
Linn	947	41.81%	646	28.52%	672	29.67%	275	12.14%	2,265
Marion	966	36.02%	1,058	39.45%	658	24.53%	-92	-3.43%	2,682
Multnomah	911	30.12%	1,556	51.44%	558	18.45%	-645	-21.32%	3,025
Polk	321	27.77%	334	28.89%	501	43.34%	-167	-14.45%	1,156
Tillamook	50	32.47%	99	64.29%	5	3.25%	-49	-31.82%	154
Umatilla	500	47.21%	134	12.65%	425	40.13%	75	7.08%	1,059
Union	444	49.17%	369	40.86%	90	9.97%	75	8.31%	903
Wasco	374	40.17%	202	21.70%	355	38.13%	19	2.04%	931
Washington	286	30.14%	202	21.29%	461	48.58%	-175	-18.44%	949
Yamhill	502	38.23%	442	33.66%	369	28.10%	60	4.57%	1,313
Total	9,713	38.23%	9,163	36.06%	6,532	25.71%	550	2.16%	25,409

==== Counties that flipped from Republican to Democratic ====
- Clackamas
- Yamhill

==== Counties that flipped from Democratic to Republican ====
- Coos
- Lane

==== Counties that flipped from Democratic to Independent ====
- Douglas
- Grant
- Polk

==== Counties that flipped from Republican to Independent ====
- Washington
