= 1898 Oregon gubernatorial election =

- June 6, 1898
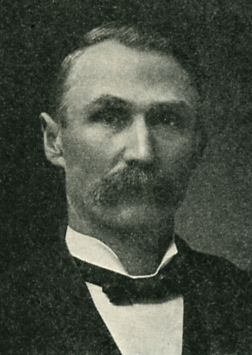

| Nominee | Theodore Thurston Geer | William R. King |
| Party | Republican | Democratic |
| Alliance | | Populist |
| Popular vote | 45,093 | 34,542 |
| Percentage | 53.22% | 40.77% |
- County results Geer: 40–50% 50–60% 60–70% King: 40–50% 50–60%
Governor before election
William Paine Lord
Republican
Elected Governor
T. T. Geer
Republican

The 1898 Oregon gubernatorial election took place on June 6, 1898 to elect the governor of the U.S. state of Oregon. The election matched Republican Theodore Thurston Geer against Democratic State Senator W. R. King.

Geer was the tenth governor since statehood, but the first native Oregonian to hold that position.

== Results ==
1898 Oregon gubernatorial election
| Party | Candidate | Votes | % | ±% |
|---|---|---|---|---|
| Republican | T. T. Geer | 45,093 | 53.22% | +5.99% |
| Fusion (Note: Democratic, People's (Populist), and Silver Republican) | William R. King | 34,452 | 40.77% | +20.26% |
| Regular Populist | John C. Luce | 2,878 | 3.40% | −26.59% |
| Prohibition | H. M. Clinton | 2,219 | 2.62% | +0.34% |
| Total votes | | 84,732 | 100.00% | |
| Majority | | 10,551 | 12.45% | |
| Republican hold | | Swing | -14.27% | |

=== Results by county ===
| County | T. T. Geer Republican | | William R. King Democratic | | John C. Luce Populist | | H. M. Clinton Prohibition | | Margin | | Total votes cast |
| County | # | % | # | % | # | % | # | % | # | % | Total votes cast |
|---|---|---|---|---|---|---|---|---|---|---|---|
| Baker | 1,191 | 42.64% | 1,436 | 51.41% | 115 | 4.12% | 51 | 1.83% | -245 | -8.77% | 2,793 |
| Benton | 995 | 51.16% | 872 | 44.83% | 21 | 1.08% | 57 | 2.93% | 123 | 6.32% | 1,945 |
| Clackamas | 2,161 | 51.70% | 1,772 | 42.39% | 141 | 3.37% | 106 | 2.54% | 389 | 9.31% | 4,180 |
| Clatsop | 1,588 | 61.74% | 809 | 31.45% | 86 | 3.34% | 89 | 3.46% | 779 | 30.29% | 2,572 |
| Columbia | 724 | 52.85% | 534 | 38.98% | 64 | 4.67% | 48 | 3.50% | 190 | 13.87% | 1,370 |
| Coos | 957 | 44.37% | 1,013 | 46.96% | 139 | 6.44% | 48 | 2.23% | -56 | -2.60% | 2,157 |
| Crook | 667 | 55.35% | 492 | 40.83% | 25 | 2.07% | 21 | 1.74% | 175 | 14.52% | 1,205 |
| Curry | 301 | 53.09% | 252 | 44.44% | 6 | 1.06% | 8 | 1.41% | 49 | 8.64% | 567 |
| Douglas | 1,653 | 46.77% | 1,789 | 50.62% | 30 | 0.85% | 62 | 1.75% | -136 | -3.85% | 3,534 |
| Gilliam | 554 | 57.23% | 342 | 35.33% | 44 | 4.55% | 28 | 2.89% | 212 | 21.90% | 968 |
| Grant | 973 | 54.42% | 678 | 37.92% | 112 | 6.26% | 25 | 1.40% | 295 | 16.50% | 1,788 |
| Harney | 347 | 42.06% | 416 | 50.42% | 54 | 6.55% | 8 | 0.97% | -69 | -8.36% | 825 |
| Jackson | 1,350 | 43.76% | 1,277 | 41.39% | 389 | 12.61% | 69 | 2.24% | 73 | 2.37% | 3,085 |
| Josephine | 825 | 45.55% | 894 | 49.36% | 55 | 3.04% | 37 | 2.04% | -69 | -3.81% | 1,811 |
| Klamath | 439 | 52.45% | 342 | 40.86% | 41 | 4.90% | 15 | 1.79% | 97 | 11.59% | 837 |
| Lake | 433 | 56.02% | 323 | 41.79% | 10 | 1.29% | 7 | 0.91% | 110 | 14.23% | 773 |
| Lane | 1,929 | 47.66% | 1,885 | 46.58% | 138 | 3.41% | 95 | 2.35% | 44 | 1.09% | 4,047 |
| Lincoln | 479 | 51.78% | 414 | 44.76% | 14 | 1.51% | 18 | 1.95% | 65 | 7.03% | 925 |
| Linn | 1,902 | 44.98% | 2,026 | 47.91% | 145 | 3.43% | 156 | 3.69% | -124 | -2.93% | 4,229 |
| Malheur | 387 | 38.93% | 555 | 55.84% | 27 | 2.72% | 25 | 2.52% | -168 | -16.90% | 994 |
| Marion | 3,216 | 52.67% | 2,713 | 44.43% | 70 | 1.15% | 107 | 1.75% | 503 | 8.24% | 6,106 |
| Morrow | 532 | 50.86% | 470 | 44.93% | 27 | 2.58% | 17 | 1.63% | 62 | 5.93% | 1,046 |
| Multnomah | 10,351 | 65.72% | 4,637 | 29.44% | 266 | 1.69% | 495 | 3.14% | 5,714 | 36.28% | 15,749 |
| Polk | 1,267 | 49.40% | 1,170 | 45.61% | 60 | 2.34% | 68 | 2.65% | 97 | 3.78% | 2,565 |
| Sherman | 478 | 54.88% | 285 | 32.72% | 41 | 4.71% | 67 | 7.69% | 193 | 22.16% | 871 |
| Tillamook | 635 (Note: The House Journal contains a typo for Geer in this county.) | 61.71% | 323 | 31.39% | 46 | 4.47% | 25 | 2.43% | 312 | 30.32% | 1,029 |
| Umatilla | 1,847 | 52.31% | 1,466 | 41.52% | 112 | 3.17% | 106 | 3.00% | 381 | 10.79% | 3,531 |
| Union | 1,625 | 48.19% | 1,453 | 43.09% | 245 | 7.27% | 49 | 1.45% | 172 | 5.10% | 3,372 |
| Wallowa | 538 | 49.63% | 354 | 32.66% | 170 | 15.68% | 22 | 2.03% | 184 | 16.97% | 1,084 |
| Wasco | 1,360 | 56.86% | 933 | 39.01% | 41 | 1.71% | 58 | 2.42% | 427 | 17.85% | 2,392 |
| Washington | 1,743 | 55.14% | 1,219 | 38.56% | 89 | 2.82% | 110 | 3.48% | 524 | 16.58% | 3,161 |
| Yamhill | 1,646 | 51.10% | 1,398 | 43.40% | 55 | 1.71% | 122 | 3.79% | 248 | 7.70% | 3,221 |
| Total | 45,093 | 35.22% | 34,542 | 40.77% | 2,878 | 3.40% | 2,219 | 2.62% | 10,551 | 12.45% | 84,732 |

==== Counties that flipped from Populist to Republican ====
- Jackson
- Wallowa

==== Counties that flipped from Republican to Democratic ====
- Douglas
- Josephine
- Linn

==== Counties that flipped from Populist to Democratic ====
- Baker
- Coos
