= Douglas McKay =

American politician

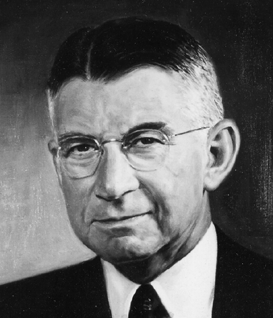

35th United States Secretary of the Interior
- In office January 21, 1953 – April 15, 1956
- President: Dwight D. Eisenhower
- Preceded by: Oscar L. Chapman
- Succeeded by: Fred A. Seaton

25th Governor of Oregon
- In office January 10, 1949 – December 27, 1952
- Preceded by: John Hall
- Succeeded by: Paul L. Patterson

Personal details
- Born: James Douglas McKay; June 24, 1893 Portland, Oregon, U.S.
- Died: July 22, 1959 (aged 66) Salem, Oregon, U.S.
- Party: Republican
- Spouse: Mabel Hill (m. 1917)
- Children: 3
- Education: Oregon State University, Corvallis

Military service
- Allegiance: United States
- Branch/service: United States Army
- Battles/wars: World War I

James Douglas McKay (June 24, 1893 – July 22, 1959) was an American businessman and politician from the U.S. state of Oregon. He served in World War I before going into business, where he was most successful as a car dealership owner in Salem. A Republican, he served as a city councilor and mayor of Salem before election to the Oregon State Senate. McKay served four terms in the state senate, also served stateside with the rank of major in the U.S. Army during World War II, served as the 25th governor of Oregon from 1949 to 1952. He left that office before the end of his term when he was selected as the 35th U.S. Secretary of the Interior during the Eisenhower administration. McKay's conservative policies were denounced by environmentalists; they forced his resignation in 1956.

== Early life and business career ==
McKay was born in Portland, Oregon, to farmer Edwin D. McKay and his wife Minnie A. Musgrove. His family's limited means required him to work while still a schoolboy. After his father's death in 1911, McKay was forced to leave school before receiving a high school diploma.

He was admitted to Oregon State College in Corvallis as an agriculture student at the age of twenty. McKay was elected student body president in 1916. He graduated with a Bachelor of Science degree and married Mabel Christine Hill on March 31, 1917. They had one son and two daughters: Douglas, Shirley and Marylou McKay. In November of 1939, his son, Douglas Jr., died in an automobile accident.

During World War I, he served with the United States Army in Europe, where he advanced to the rank of first lieutenant. He sustained an injury in battle to his leg, right arm, and shoulder, which earned him a Purple Heart. Upon discharge, the disability prevented him from performing the strenuous activities involved with farming, so he began a business career in Portland selling insurance, and then automobiles, rising to the position of sales manager. After the move to the sales manager position, the company sent him to Salem, where he was in charge of their dealership in that city.

He opened Douglas McKay Chevrolet Co. in 1927, and later started a Cadillac dealership as well. McKay later served as president of the Oregon Automobile Dealer's Association.

== Early political career ==
McKay won election to several local political offices as a Republican, becoming mayor of Salem in 1932, and guided that city through fiscal troubles in the wake of the Great Depression. Steering his city into recovery, according to a contemporary journalist quoted by biographer Herbert S. Parmet, made McKay "a firm advocate of government as well as business preserving and guarding its financial foundation."

McKay was elected to the Oregon State Senate in 1934, serving four terms interrupted by service as a major in the Army during World War II. In 1940, he was an alternate delegate to the Republican National Convention, which nominated the Willkie-McNary ticket.

== Governor of Oregon ==
He was elected governor in 1948 on a platform of fiscal conservatism and economic development. As Governor, McKay took a balanced approach to state government. He was a strong advocate for resource conservation; however, he also supported cutting of old growth timber to create jobs for Oregonians. McKay actively opposed the Federal Government's plan to create a Columbia Valley Authority. He supported legislation to turn over 95 percent of the profits from the Oregon Liquor Control Commission to the state's general fund with the remaining profits going to Oregon cities based on population. He advocated expanding Oregon's highway system, supporting a successful bond issue that raised $75 million for the Oregon State Highway Department. McKay won reelection as governor in 1950.

Tom McCall, who would later become governor, served as McKay's executive secretary and press officer between 1949 and 1951.

== Secretary of the Interior ==
Secretary McKay and Dwight D. Eisenhower had significant ideological differences, the General being identified with the Republican moderates, and McKay with the conservative wing. Fearing that conservative Senator Robert A. Taft had little or no chance of winning the presidency in 1952, and admiring Eisenhower for his military record and leadership qualities, McKay supported Eisenhower's candidacy early in the campaign. Upon his election, Eisenhower appointed McKay as Secretary of the Interior. McKay resigned as Oregon governor on December 27, 1952.

As the U.S. Secretary of the Interior, McKay hoped to balance his concern for natural resources with fiscal and business acumen. Secretary McKay abolished five divisions within the Interior Department, cutting four thousand positions and reducing the budget by nearly $200 million. He fostered partnerships involving the states, local public groups, private enterprise, and the Federal Government in building facilities and developing natural resources. However McKay worked to prevent the Columbia Valley Authority and protection of the Hell's Canyon project. McKay created nine new wildlife reserves and he opposed the transfer of Wichita Mountains Wildlife Refuge property to the Army. However, he also advocated building a dam at Echo Park which would have flooded Dinosaur National Monument. In Oregon, he allowed a mining company to harvest timber; for that, his critics dubbed him, "Giveaway McKay." He also supported Indian termination policy in 1954. Liberals and environmentalists strongly denounced him and he resigned in disgust in 1956.

In 1954, McKay was featured on the cover of the edition of August 23 of Time.

== Later years and legacy ==
At the urging of Eisenhower, McKay resigned March 9, 1956, effective April 15, 1956, to challenge incumbent Wayne Morse for his seat in the United States Senate. He lost a fierce campaign, in no small measure because of the opposition he had engendered among Oregon conservation groups. Eisenhower replaced the more conservative McKay at Interior with a Moderate Republican, Fred Andrew Seaton, a former short-term senator from Nebraska.

He died of a heart attack in Salem, Oregon, at the age of 66, and was interred at Belcrest Memorial Park in Salem.

Salem's Douglas McKay High School, built in 1979, bears his name.

Political offices
Preceded by John H. Hall	Governor of Oregon; 1949–1952	Succeeded by Paul L. Patterson
Preceded by Oscar Littleton Chapman	United States Secretary of the Interior; 1953–1956	Succeeded by Fred Andrew Seaton
Party political offices
Preceded by Earl Snell	Republican nominee for Governor of Oregon; 1948, 1950	Succeeded by Paul L. Patterson
Preceded by Wayne Morse	Republican nominee for U.S. Senator from Oregon (Class 3); 1956	Succeeded by Sig Unander
