= 1948 Oregon gubernatorial special election =

- November 2, 1948
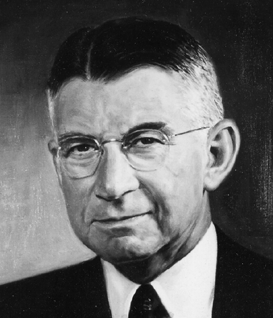

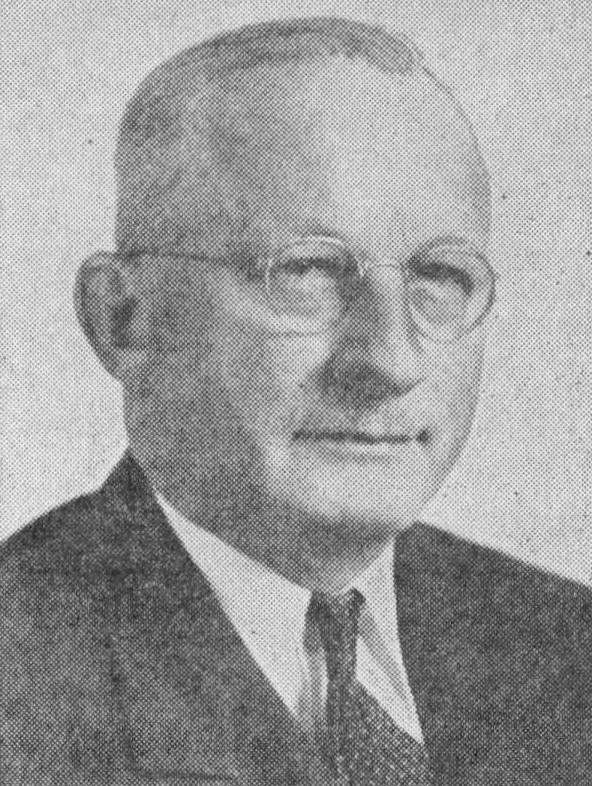
Nominee	Douglas McKay	Lew Wallace
Party	Republican	Democratic
Popular vote	271,295	226,958
Percentage	53.23%	44.53%
- County results: McKay: 40–50% 50–60% 60–70% Wallace: 40–50% 50–60%
Governor before election
John Hubert Hall
Republican
Elected Governor
Douglas McKay
Republican

The 1948 Oregon gubernatorial special election took place on November 2, 1948, to elect the governor of the U.S. state of Oregon. A special election was needed due to the death of governor Earl Snell, who was killed in a plane crash on October 28, 1947. Republican Douglas McKay defeated Democrat Lew Wallace to fill the remainder of Snell's term.

== Primary election ==
Oregon held primary elections on May 21, 1948.

=== Republican party ===
Incumbent governor John Hubert Hall, who took over after Snell's death until the election, lost the Republican nomination to state senator Douglas McKay.

==== Candidates ====
- Glenn C. Ackerman, businessman
- John H. Hall, incumbent governor
- Douglas McKay, member of Oregon State Senate
- John Peyton

==== Results ====
Republican primary results
Party	Candidate	Votes	%
Republican	Douglas McKay	107,993	47.66%
Republican	John H. Hall (inc.)	103,224	45.55%
Republican	Glenn C. Ackerman	9,251	4.08%
Republican	John Peyton	6,131	2.71%
Total votes		226,599	100.00%

=== Democratic primary ===
Lew Wallace, who previously ran for governor in 1942, was nominated again, facing no opposition in the Democratic primary.

==== Candidates ====
- Lew Wallace, member of Oregon State Senate

==== Results ====
Democratic primary results
Party	Candidate	Votes	%
Democratic	Lew Wallace	120,218	98.64%
Democratic	Scattering	1,652	1.36%
Total votes		121,870	100.00%

== General election ==
=== Candidates ===
- Douglas McKay, Republican
- Lew Wallace, Democratic
- Wendell E. Barnett, Independent

=== Results ===
1948 Oregon gubernatorial special election
Party	Candidate	Votes	%	±%
Republican	Douglas McKay	271,295	53.23%	−15.83%
Democratic	Lew Wallace	226,958	44.53%	+13.60%
Independent	Wendell E. Barnett	11,380	2.23%	
Total votes		509,633	100.00%	
Majority		44,337	8.70%	
Republican hold		Swing	-29.42%	

=== Results by county ===
County	Douglas McKay Republican		Lew Wallace Democratic		Wendell E. Barnett Independent		Margin		Total votes cast
County	#	%	#	%	#	%	#	%	Total votes cast
Baker	2,992	51.21%	2,741	46.91%	110	1.88%	251	4.30%	5,843
Benton	6,964	68.51%	3,015	29.66%	186	1.83%	3,949	38.85%	10,165
Clackamas	15,042	51.06%	13,699	46.50%	721	2.45%	1,343	4.56%	29,462
Clatsop	5,714	52.48%	4,979	45.73%	195	1.79%	735	6.75%	10,888
Columbia	3,450	42.96%	4,397	54.75%	184	2.29%	-947	-11.79%	8,031
Coos	5,337	48.28%	5,447	49.27%	271	2.45%	-110	-1.00%	11,055
Crook	989	51.40%	903	46.93%	32	1.66%	86	4.47%	1,924
Curry	1,113	61.63%	648	35.88%	45	2.49%	465	25.75%	1,806
Deschutes	3,431	50.98%	3,160	46.95%	139	2.07%	271	4.03%	6,730
Douglas	8,005	60.47%	4,912	37.10%	322	2.43%	3,093	23.36%	13,239
Gilliam	665	57.63%	469	40.64%	20	1.73%	196	16.98%	1,154
Grant	1,318	60.46%	813	37.29%	49	2.25%	505	23.17%	2,180
Harney	848	53.23%	721	45.26%	24	1.51%	127	7.97%	1,593
Hood River	2,344	59.55%	1,511	38.39%	81	2.06%	833	21.16%	3,936
Jackson	10,679	57.31%	7,666	41.14%	289	1.55%	3,013	16.17%	18,634
Jefferson	671	56.34%	484	40.64%	36	3.02%	187	15.70%	1,191
Josephine	4,696	57.03%	3,363	40.84%	175	2.13%	1,333	16.19%	8,234
Klamath	7,088	49.13%	7,074	49.03%	266	1.84%	14	0.10%	14,428
Lake	1,184	55.35%	894	41.80%	61	2.85%	290	13.56%	2,139
Lane	21,882	60.45%	13,419	37.07%	895	2.47%	8,463	23.38%	36,196
Lincoln	3,660	48.73%	3,673	48.90%	178	2.37%	-13	-0.17%	7,511
Linn	8,484	55.31%	6,444	42.01%	412	2.69%	2,040	13.30%	15,340
Malheur	3,410	60.70%	2,098	37.34%	110	1.96%	1,312	23.35%	5,618
Marion	19,048	58.14%	12,611	38.49%	1,106	3.38%	6,437	19.65%	32,765
Morrow	1,014	65.46%	502	32.41%	33	2.13%	512	33.05%	1,549
Multnomah	89,724	48.60%	90,909	49.24%	3,986	2.16%	-1,185	-0.64%	184,619
Polk	4,835	60.92%	2,937	37.00%	165	2.08%	1,898	23.91%	7,937
Sherman	655	67.11%	309	31.66%	12	1.23%	346	35.45%	976
Tillamook	3,256	53.59%	2,697	44.39%	123	2.02%	559	9.20%	6,076
Umatilla	6,122	55.67%	4,600	41.83%	275	2.50%	1,522	13.84%	10,997
Union	3,030	45.96%	3,473	52.68%	90	1.37%	-443	-6.72%	6,593
Wallowa	1,353	53.63%	1,114	44.15%	56	2.22%	239	9.47%	2,523
Wasco	3,113	60.10%	1,975	38.13%	92	1.78%	1,138	21.97%	5,180
Washington	11,725	55.88%	8,876	42.30%	383	1.83%	2,849	13.58%	20,984
Wheeler	463	59.06%	299	38.14%	22	2.81%	164	20.92%	784
Yamhill	6,991	61.58%	4,126	36.34%	236	2.08%	2,865	25.24%	11,353
Total	271,295	53.23%	226,958	44.53%	11,380	2.23%	44,337	8.70%	509,633

==== Counties that flipped from Republican to Democratic ====
- Columbia
- Coos
- Lincoln
- Multnomah
- Union
