= 1942 Oregon gubernatorial election =

- November 3, 1942
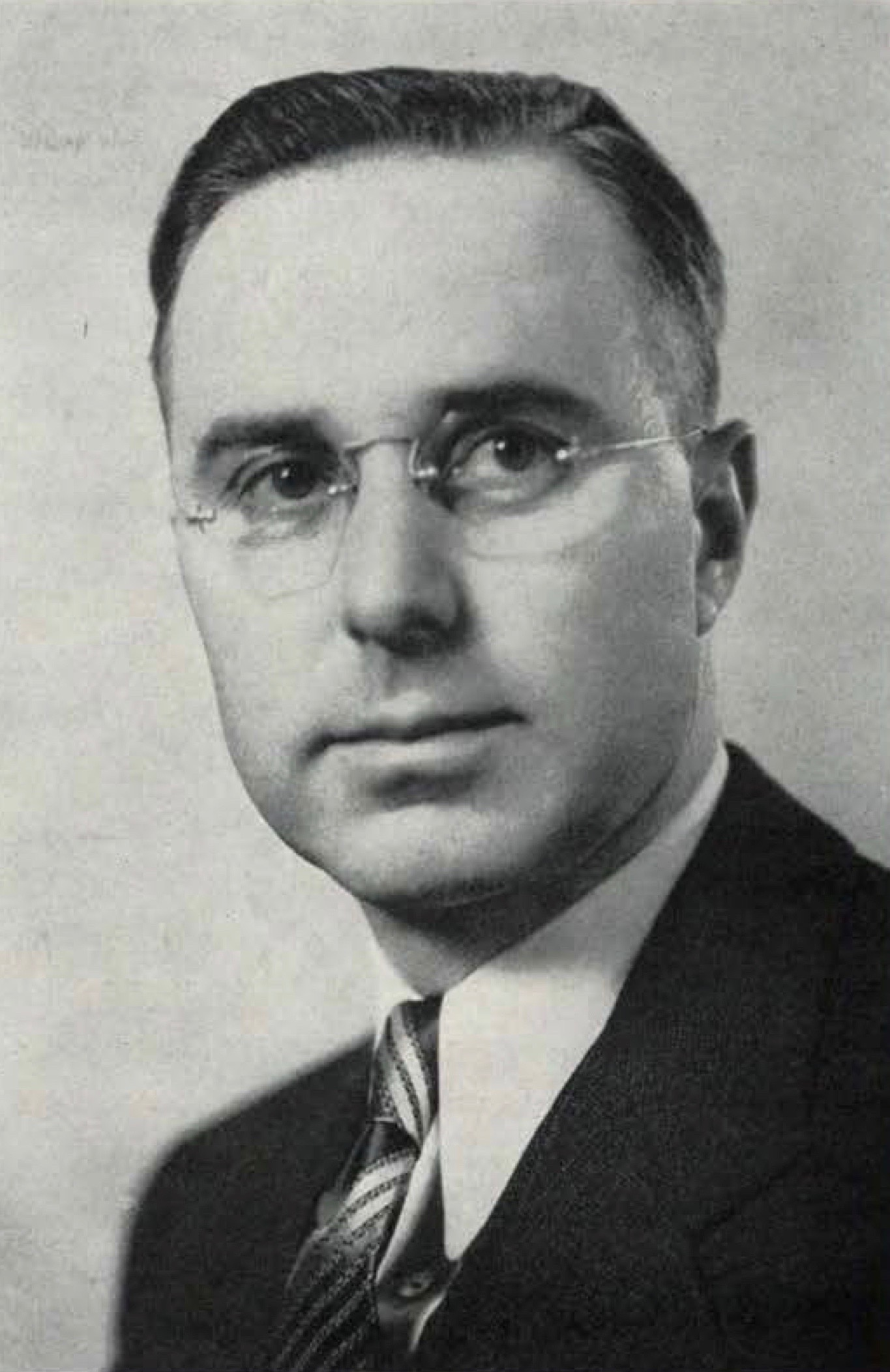

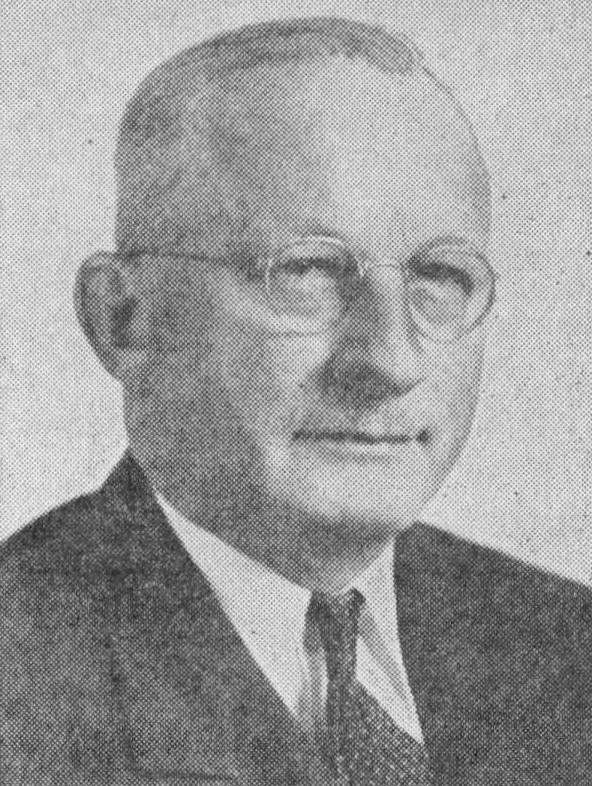
Nominee	Earl Snell	Lew Wallace
Party	Republican	Democratic
Popular vote	220,188	62,561
Percentage	77.87%	22.12%
- County results: Snell: 70–80% 80–90%
Governor before election
Charles A. Sprague
Republican
Elected Governor
Earl W. Snell
Republican

The 1942 Oregon gubernatorial election took place on November 3, 1942 to elect the governor of the U.S. state of Oregon. Republican candidate and Oregon Secretary of State Earl W. Snell defeated state senator Lew Wallace by a more than 3–1 margin, which remains the largest margin of victory in any Oregon gubernatorial election.

== Primary election ==
Oregon held primary elections on May 15, 1942.

=== Republican party ===
==== Candidates ====
- Earl Snell, Oregon Secretary of State
- Charles A. Sprague, incumbent governor

==== Campaign ====
In 1938, Republican Charles A. Sprague won an easy victory as governor following a divisive Democratic primary which had seen the defeat of the sitting governor, Charles H. Martin. That same year, Republican Earl Snell was re-elected to a second term as Secretary of State.

In 1942, Snell was ineligible for another term as Secretary and decided to challenge Sprague's re-election effort. Despite the Oregon Legislative Assembly being controlled by his own party, Sprague's progressive stance on numerous issues had caused conflict with the legislature and he had vetoed special interest legislation put forward by members of his own party. An attempted recall of Sprague was unsuccessful, but Snell used the issue, along with accusations that Sprague's efforts to efficiently organize the state for World War II had been inadequate, to achieve a comfortable victory in the primary.

==== Results ====
Republican primary results
Party	Candidate	Votes	%
Republican	Earl Snell	79,696	58.59%
Republican	Charles A. Sprague (inc.)	56,285	41.38%
Republican	Scattering	35	0.00%
Total votes		136,016	100.00%

=== Democratic party ===
In the Democratic primary, state senator Lew Wallace defeated former Oregon House speaker Howard LaTourette to win his party's nomination.

==== Candidates ====
- Grover C. Fretwell
- Howard LaTourette, former Speaker of the Oregon House of Representatives
- Lew Wallace, member of Oregon State Senate

==== Results ====
Democratic primary results
Party	Candidate	Votes	%
Democratic	Lew Wallace	36,137	47.04%
Democratic	Howard LaTourette	31,724	41.30%
Democratic	Grover C. Fretwell	7,223	9.40%
Democratic	Scattering	1,737	2.26%
Total votes		76,821	100.00%

== General election ==
In the general election, Snell crushed Wallace by the largest margin of victory ever in an Oregon governor's race, winning at least 70 percent of the vote in every county.

=== Results ===
1942 Oregon gubernatorial election
Party	Candidate	Votes	%	±%
Republican	Earl Snell	220,188	77.87%	+20.46%
Democratic	Lew Wallace	62,561	22.12%	−20.45%
Write-in	Scattering	13	0.00%	
Total votes		282,762	100.00%	
Majority		157,627	55.75%	
Republican hold		Swing	+40.91%	

=== Results by county ===
County	Earl Snell Republican		Lew Wallace Democratic		Scattering Write-in		Margin		Total votes cast
County	#	%	#	%	#	%	#	%	Total votes cast
Baker	3,224	78.23%	897	21.77%	0	0.00%	2,327	56.47%	4,121
Benton	3,817	81.16%	884	18.80%	2	0.04%	2,933	62.36%	4,703
Clackamas	12,052	78.14%	3,371	21.86%	0	0.00%	8,681	56.29%	15,423
Clatsop	5,210	84.20%	976	15.77%	2	0.03%	4,234	68.42%	6,188
Columbia	3,613	75.82%	1,152	24.18%	0	0.00%	2,461	51.65%	4,765
Coos	5,431	74.16%	1,892	25.84%	0	0.00%	3,539	48.33%	7,323
Crook	1,065	82.05%	233	17.95%	0	0.00%	832	64.10%	1,298
Curry	1,104	86.93%	166	13.07%	0	0.00%	938	73.86%	1,270
Deschutes	2,938	80.91%	693	19.09%	0	0.00%	2,245	61.83%	3,631
Douglas	5,228	80.70%	1,250	19.30%	0	0.00%	3,978	61.41%	6,478
Gilliam	662	87.11%	98	12.89%	0	0.00%	564	74.21%	760
Grant	1,113	82.38%	238	17.62%	0	0.00%	875	64.77%	1,351
Harney	737	70.73%	305	29.27%	0	0.00%	432	41.46%	1,042
Hood River	1,945	81.14%	452	18.86%	0	0.00%	1,493	62.29%	2,397
Jackson	6,065	82.54%	1,283	17.46%	0	0.00%	4,782	65.08%	7,348
Jefferson	401	80.20%	99	19.80%	0	0.00%	302	60.40%	500
Josephine	3,195	78.91%	854	21.09%	0	0.00%	2,341	57.82%	4,049
Klamath	5,297	80.88%	1,252	19.12%	0	0.00%	4,045	61.77%	6,549
Lake	1,052	77.98%	297	22.02%	0	0.00%	755	55.97%	1,349
Lane	12,578	75.35%	4,114	24.65%	0	0.00%	8,464	50.71%	16,692
Lincoln	3,039	79.87%	766	20.13%	0	0.00%	2,273	59.74%	3,805
Linn	6,396	80.37%	1,562	19.63%	0	0.00%	4,834	60.74%	7,958
Malheur	2,416	80.94%	569	19.06%	0	0.00%	1,847	61.88%	2,985
Marion	14,787	82.29%	3,175	17.67%	7	0.04%	11,612	64.62%	17,969
Morrow	859	79.39%	223	20.61%	0	0.00%	636	58.78%	1,082
Multnomah	82,356	74.79%	27,754	25.21%	0	0.00%	54,602	49.59%	110,110
Polk	4,030	81.22%	932	18.78%	0	0.00%	3,098	62.43%	4,962
Sherman	742	84.13%	140	15.87%	0	0.00%	602	68.25%	882
Tillamook	2,692	81.67%	604	18.33%	0	0.00%	2,088	63.35%	3,296
Umatilla	4,643	84.05%	881	15.95%	0	0.00%	3,762	68.10%	5,524
Union	3,637	75.69%	1,168	24.31%	0	0.00%	2,469	51.38%	4,805
Wallowa	1,363	71.51%	543	28.49%	0	0.00%	820	43.02%	1,906
Wasco	2,267	83.22%	457	16.78%	0	0.00%	1,810	66.45%	2,724
Washington	7,928	79.50%	2,042	20.48%	2	0.02%	5,886	59.03%	9,972
Wheeler	548	87.12%	81	12.88%	0	0.00%	467	74.24%	629
Yamhill	5,758	83.26%	1,158	16.74%	0	0.00%	4,600	66.51%	6,916
Total	220,188	77.87%	62,561	22.12%	13	0.00%	157,627	55.75%	282,762

==== Counties that flipped from Democratic to Republican ====
- Columbia
- Coos
- Deschutes
- Union
