= 1914 Oregon gubernatorial election =

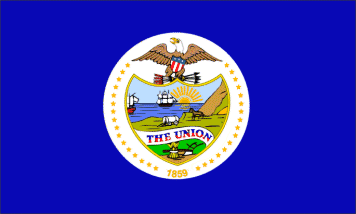
- November 3, 1914
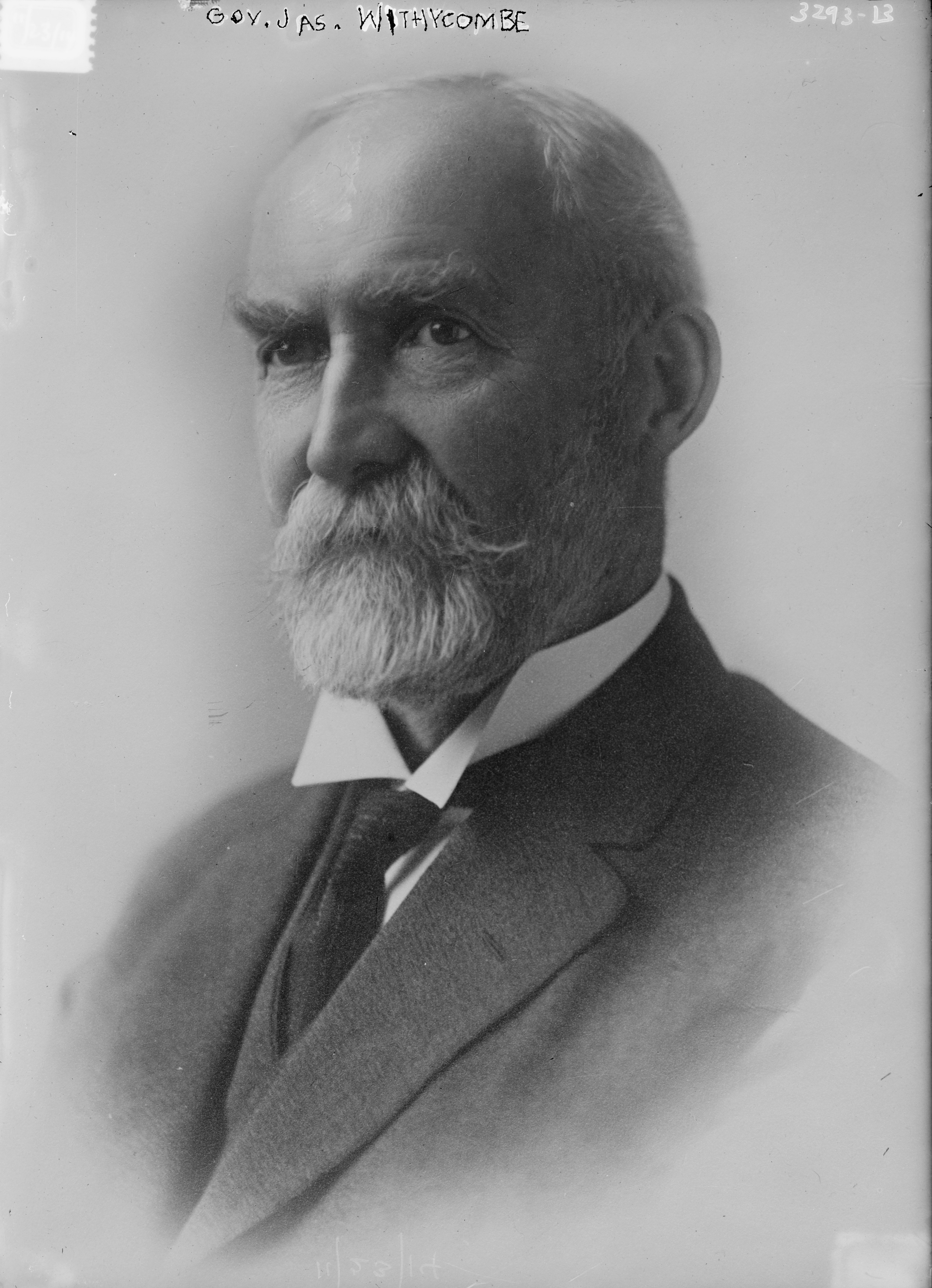

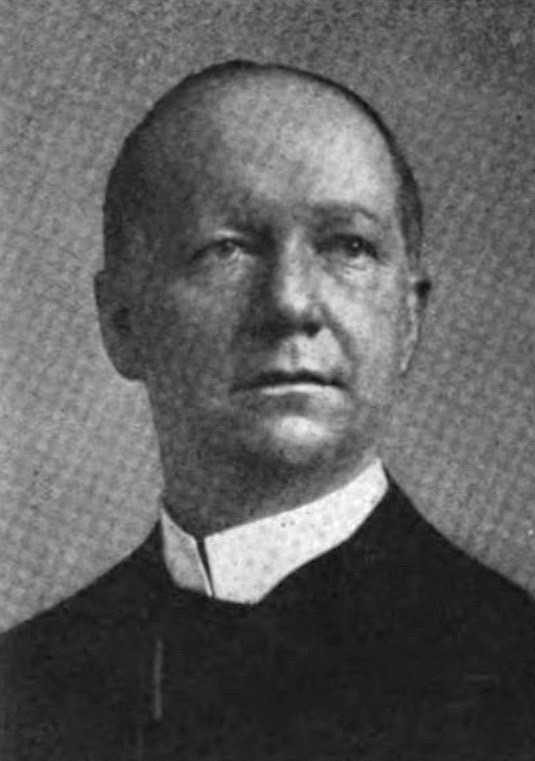

Nominee	James Withycombe	C. J. Smith	W. J. Smith
Party	Republican	Democratic	Socialist
Popular vote	121,037	94,594	14,284
Percentage	48.80%	38.13%	5.76%
- County results Withycombe: 40–50% 50–60% 60–70% Smith: 40–50% 50–60%
Governor before election
Oswald West
Democratic
Elected Governor
James Withycombe
Republican

The 1914 Oregon gubernatorial election took place on November 3, 1914, to elect the governor of the U.S. state of Oregon. The election matched Republican James Withycombe against Democratic candidate C. J. Smith. This was first election in Oregon in which women had the right to vote.

== Primary election ==
Oregon held primary elections on May 15, 1914.

=== Democratic party ===
Portland physician C. J. Smith secured the Democratic nomination over former judge A. S. Bennett.

==== Candidates ====
- C. J. Smith, physician from Portland
- A. S. Bennett, former judge from The Dalles
- G. A. Cobb, businessman and attorney from Portland
- John Manning, former district attorney from Portland
- Robert A. Miller, former member of Oregon House of Representatives

==== Results ====
Democratic primary results
Party	Candidate	Votes	%
Democratic	C. J. Smith	14,308	39.75%
Democratic	A. S. Bennett	12,788	35.52%
Democratic	John Manning	5,580	15.50%
Democratic	G. A. Cobb	2,185	6.07%
Democratic	Robert A. Miller	1,138	3.16%
Total votes		35,999	100.00%

=== Republican party ===
James Withycombe emerged from a crowded primary field to claim the Republican nomination for a second time.

==== Candidates ====
- George C. Brownell, former member of Oregon State Senate
- William A. Carter, deputy District Attorney of Multnomah County
- A. M. Crawford, Oregon Attorney General
- Grant B. Dimick, candidate for Republican nomination in 1910
- T. T. Geer, former governor
- Charles A. Johns, former mayor of Baker City
- Gus C. Moser, member of Oregon State Senate
- James Withycombe, Republican nominee for governor in 1906

==== Results ====
Republican primary results
Party	Candidate	Votes	%
Republican	James Withycombe	20,053	22.68%
Republican	Gus C. Moser	14,618	16.54%
Republican	A. M. Crawford	13,692	15.49%
Republican	Grant B. Dimick	10,058	11.38%
Republican	William A. Carter	9,435	10.67%
Republican	T. T. Geer	8,090	9.15%
Republican	Charles A. Johns	7,300	8.26%
Republican	George C. Brownell	5,154	5.83%
Total votes		88,400	100.00%

== General election ==
=== Candidates ===
- C. J. Smith, Democratic
- James Withycombe, Republican
- W. J. Smith, Socialist
- William Simon U'Ren, Non-Partisan
- F. M. Gill, Progressive
- Will E. Purdy, Non-Partisan

=== Results ===
1914 Oregon gubernatorial election
Party	Candidate	Votes	%	±%
Republican	James Withycombe	121,037	48.80%	+7.37%
Democratic	C. J. Smith	94,594	38.13%	−8.47%
Socialist	W. J. Smith	14,284	5.76%	−1.07%
Nonpartisan	William Simon U'Ren	10,493	4.23%	
Progressive	F. M. Gill	6,129	2.47%	
Nonpartisan	Will E. Purdy	1,515	0.61%	
Total votes		248,052	100.00%	
Plurality		26,443	10.66%	
Republican gain from Democratic		Swing	+15.85%	

=== Results by county ===
Withycombe was the first Republican to carry Baker County in a gubernatorial election, though this was not the first time it had failed to back the Democratic candidate as it voted for the Populist candidate in 1894.

County	James Withycombe Republican		C. J. Smith Democratic		W. J. Smith Socialist		W. S. U'Ren Non-Partisan		F. M. Gill Progressive		Will E. Purdy Non-Partisan		Margin		Total votes cast
County	#	%	#	%	#	%	#	%	#	%	#	%	#	%	Total votes cast
Baker	3,066	48.49%	2,430	38.43%	504	7.97%	117	1.85%	165	2.61%	41	0.65%	636	10.06%	6,323
Benton	3,293	60.81%	1,719	31.75%	187	3.45%	100	1.85%	99	1.83%	17	0.31%	1,574	29.07%	5,415
Clackamas	5,082	43.77%	3,476	29.94%	582	5.01%	1,948	16.78%	441	3.80%	81	0.70%	1,606	13.83%	11,610
Clatsop	2,627	55.68%	1,371	29.06%	407	8.63%	141	2.99%	137	2.90%	35	0.74%	1,256	26.62%	4,718
Columbia	1,827	52.94%	1,082	31.35%	298	8.64%	99	2.87%	113	3.27%	32	0.93%	745	21.59%	3,451
Coos	3,009	43.37%	2,100	30.27%	1,128	16.26%	458	6.60%	194	2.80%	49	0.71%	909	13.10%	6,938
Crook	1,824	33.90%	2,844	52.85%	370	6.88%	143	2.66%	174	3.23%	26	0.48%	-1,020	-18.96%	5,381
Curry	445	41.01%	449	41.38%	132	12.17%	29	2.67%	25	2.30%	5	0.46%	-4	-0.37%	1,085
Douglas	3,770	50.04%	2,827	37.52%	604	8.02%	141	1.87%	159	2.11%	33	0.44%	943	12.52%	7,534
Gilliam	822	56.85%	528	36.51%	46	3.18%	15	1.04%	28	1.94%	7	0.48%	294	20.33%	1,446
Grant	1,020	46.07%	899	40.61%	164	7.41%	66	2.98%	50	2.26%	15	0.68%	121	5.47%	2,214
Harney	930	42.54%	917	41.95%	211	9.65%	55	2.52%	53	2.42%	20	0.91%	13	0.59%	2,186
Hood River	1,236	48.17%	981	38.23%	165	6.43%	79	3.08%	96	3.74%	9	0.35%	255	9.94%	2,566
Jackson	2,665	30.72%	4,834	55.72%	566	6.52%	343	3.95%	215	2.48%	52	0.60%	-2,169	-25.00%	8,675
Josephine	1,459	43.87%	1,340	40.29%	270	8.12%	140	4.21%	99	2.98%	18	0.54%	119	3.58%	3,326
Klamath	1,576	48.28%	1,204	36.89%	227	6.95%	86	2.63%	131	4.01%	40	1.23%	372	11.40%	3,264
Lake	683	45.23%	639	42.32%	99	6.56%	28	1.85%	48	3.18%	13	0.86%	44	2.91%	1,510
Lane	6,733	50.80%	5,009	37.79%	916	6.91%	206	1.55%	294	2.22%	97	0.73%	1,724	13.01%	13,255
Lincoln	1,143	49.16%	804	34.58%	259	11.14%	58	2.49%	50	2.15%	11	0.47%	339	14.58%	2,325
Linn	4,217	45.37%	4,237	45.59%	436	4.69%	205	2.21%	138	1.48%	61	0.66%	-20	-0.22%	9,294
Malheur	2,271	48.63%	1,688	36.15%	347	7.43%	109	2.33%	219	4.69%	36	0.77%	583	12.48%	4,670
Marion	7,969	53.97%	5,571	37.73%	594	4.02%	245	1.66%	274	1.86%	113	0.77%	2,398	16.24%	14,766
Morrow	1,010	55.99%	541	29.99%	172	9.53%	10	0.55%	44	2.44%	27	1.50%	469	26.00%	1,804
Multnomah	39,003	51.58%	27,127	35.88%	3,230	4.27%	4,542	6.01%	1,407	1.86%	303	0.40%	11,876	15.71%	75,612
Polk	2,958	49.16%	2,522	41.91%	294	4.89%	96	1.60%	105	1.75%	42	0.70%	436	7.25%	6,017
Sherman	676	51.84%	484	37.12%	60	4.60%	11	0.84%	71	5.44%	2	0.15%	192	14.72%	1,304
Tillamook	1,358	49.19%	989	35.82%	183	6.63%	145	5.25%	55	1.99%	31	1.12%	369	13.36%	2,761
Umatilla	3,923	46.49%	3,727	44.17%	396	4.69%	148	1.75%	190	2.25%	54	0.64%	196	2.32%	8,438
Union	2,631	45.98%	2,460	42.99%	341	5.96%	114	1.99%	158	2.76%	18	0.31%	171	2.99%	5,722
Wallowa	1,300	45.95%	1,141	40.33%	240	8.48%	50	1.77%	80	2.83%	18	0.64%	159	5.62%	2,829
Wasco	2,215	48.28%	1,747	38.08%	205	4.47%	77	1.68%	312	6.80%	32	0.70%	468	10.20%	4,588
Washington	4,151	50.88%	3,101	38.01%	344	4.22%	241	2.95%	228	2.79%	93	1.14%	1,050	12.87%	8,158
Wheeler	624	56.99%	398	36.35%	26	2.37%	28	2.56%	19	1.74%	0	0.00%	226	20.64%	1,095
Yamhill	3,521	45.30%	3,408	43.85%	281	3.62%	220	2.83%	258	3.32%	84	1.08%	113	1.45%	7,772
Total	121,037	48.80%	94,594	38.13%	14,284	5.76%	10,493	4.23%	6,129	2.47%	1,515	0.61%	26,443	10.66%	248,052

==== Counties that flipped from Democratic to Republican ====
- Baker
- Benton
- Clackamas
- Clatsop
- Douglas
- Grant
- Harney
- Lincoln
- Malheur
- Marion
- Multnomah
- Polk
- Tillamook
- Union
- Wallowa
- Yamhill
