= Jay Bowerman =

13th Governor of Oregon

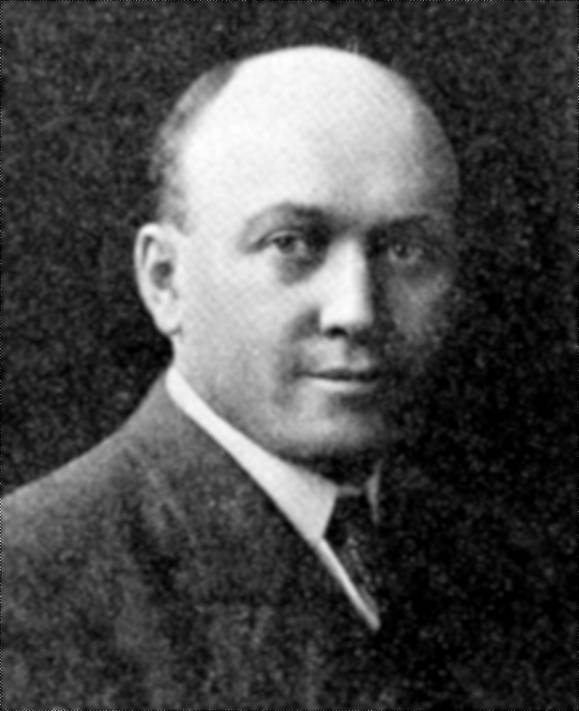

13th Governor of Oregon
- In office June 17, 1910 – January 11, 1911
- Preceded by: Frank W. Benson
- Succeeded by: Oswald West

President of the Oregon State Senate
- In office 1909–1910
- Preceded by: E. W. Haines
- Succeeded by: Ben Selling

Personal details
- Born: August 15, 1876 Hesper, Iowa, US
- Died: October 25, 1957 (aged 81) Portland, Oregon, US
- Party: Republican
- Spouse(s): Elizabeth Hoover Bowerman, 1903; Wayfe Hockett Bowerman, 1914
- Children: Bill Bowerman
- Education: Willamette University
- Profession: Lawyer

Jay Bowerman (August 15, 1876 – October 25, 1957) was an American politician of the Republican Party who served as the 13th governor of Oregon, for the final few months of the term of Frank Benson, who retired due to illness.

== Early life ==
Bowerman was born in Hesper, Iowa, the son of Daniel and Lydia (Battey) Bowerman. He received his early education in public schools and moved to Salem, Oregon, in 1893.

Bowerman entered Willamette University in 1893, and graduated with a law degree in 1896. He was admitted to the Oregon Bar the following year, practicing law in Salem until 1899. He then moved to Condon, in Gilliam County, Oregon, where he lived for the next 12 years. There he became a law partner of H. H. Henricks. Bowerman's service in the Spanish–American War briefly interrupted his practice of law.

== Political career ==
Bowerman was a Republican. He was elected to the Oregon State Senate from Gilliam County in 1904 and was reelected four years later. He served as president of that body from 1909 to 1911.

When Governor Frank W. Benson was incapacitated by ill health in June 1910, he asked Bowerman, as president of the Senate, to assume gubernatorial responsibilities. On June 16, 1910, at age thirty-three, Bowerman became Acting Governor.

Mindful of the bureaucracy of a large administration, Bowerman advocated the establishment of a Board of Control to administer the state institutions, which would permit fiscal savings by combined purchasing for state institutions through the office of a single purchasing agent. However, the Board of Control was not established until the administration of his successor.

He also acted to reduce the risk of loss through bank failure by prohibiting Oregon bankers from the use of speculative stock as assets if they had actively promoted that stock.

In 1904, the citizens of Oregon adopted a direct primary law prohibiting party nominating conventions. Establishment Republicans, unwilling to relinquish party control over nominations, held an "assembly" in 1910 at which they nominated Bowerman as their candidate for governor.

Bowerman's Democratic gubernatorial rival, Oswald West, cast him as an opponent of the Oregon System of direct government. Bowerman campaigned on a platform supporting modernized highway systems, increased economies in the administration of government, and continued tight control of state land management.

West defeated him 54,853 votes to 48,751.

== Later life ==
After leaving the office of governor on January 8, 1911, Bowerman moved to Portland, where he resumed the practice of law. He was reelected president of the State Senate but retired following the 1911 session.

As a private citizen he actively supported Oregon's first statewide bond issue for highway construction, a $6,000,000 proposal. He also served as an active lobbyist for years at the State Legislature.

Bowerman died in Portland in 1957, and was buried in Lincoln Memorial Park in Portland, Oregon.

== Personal life ==
Bowerman married Elizabeth Hoover in 1903 and they had four children. His son Bill Bowerman became a well-known track and field coach at the University of Oregon, as well as coach of the U.S. Olympic Track and Field team at the 1972 Olympics in Munich. He co-founded Nike, Inc. with Phil Knight.

Bowerman and Elizabeth eventually divorced, and Bowerman married Wayfe Hockett in 1914. This marriage produced two children.

Political offices
Preceded by Frank W. Benson	Governor of Oregon; 1910–1911	Succeeded by Oswald West
Party political offices
Preceded by James Withycombe	Republican nominee for Governor of Oregon; 1910	Succeeded by James Withycombe
