= Wallace McCamant =

American judge (1867–1944)

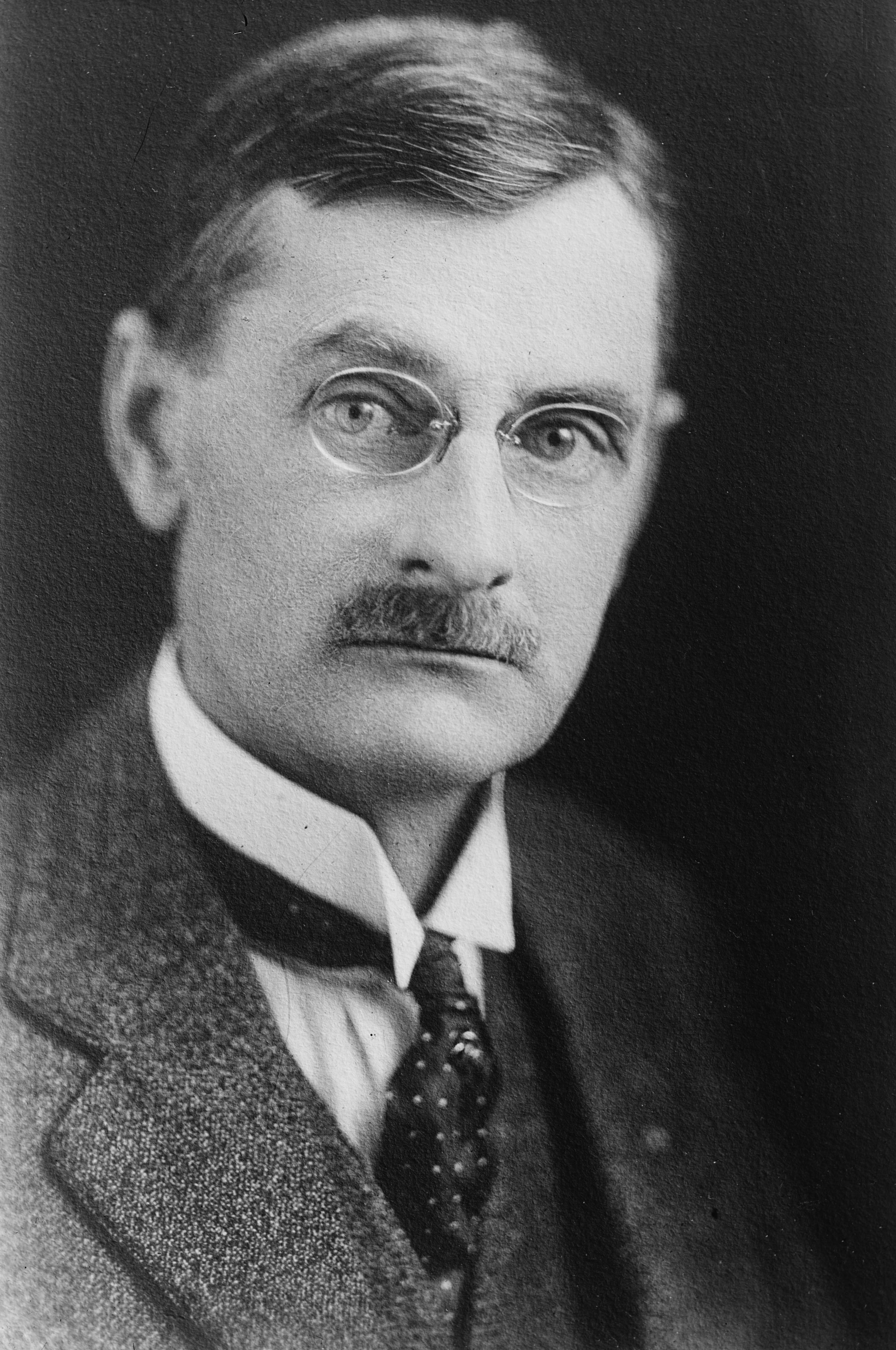

Judge of the United States Court of Appeals for the Ninth Circuit
- In office May 25, 1925 – May 2, 1926
- Appointed by: Calvin Coolidge
- Preceded by: Erskine Mayo Ross
- Succeeded by: Frank Sigel Dietrich

17th Justice of the Oregon Supreme Court
- In office 1917–1918
- Appointed by: James Withycombe
- Preceded by: Robert Eakin
- Succeeded by: Charles A. Johns

Personal details
- Born: Wallace McCamant; September 22, 1867 Hollidaysburg, Pennsylvania, U.S.
- Died: December 17, 1944 (aged 77)
- Education: Lafayette College (PhB) read law
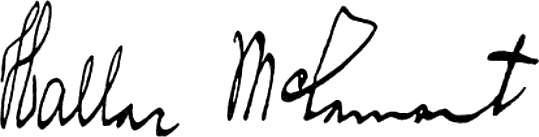
- Signature

Wallace McCamant (September 22, 1867 – December 17, 1944) was an American jurist in Oregon. A Pennsylvania native, he served as the 46th justice of the Oregon Supreme Court from 1917 to 1918. Later he served briefly as a United States circuit judge of the United States Court of Appeals for the Ninth Circuit. As a delegate to the Republican National Convention in 1920, McCamant surprised the GOP leadership by placing the name of Calvin Coolidge into nomination for Vice-President. Coolidge would become the 30th President of the United States upon the death of President Harding in 1923.

== Education and career ==
Born on September 22, 1867, in Hollidaysburg, Pennsylvania, McCamant was the son of Thomas McCamant and the former Delia Robbins. He grew up in Harrisburg, Pennsylvania and attended the public schools in that town. In 1888 he graduated from Lafayette College in Easton, Pennsylvania with a Bachelor of Philosophy degree. Wallace then read law and in 1890 was admitted to the bar in Pennsylvania and subsequently moved to Oregon. He then entered private practice in Portland, Oregon at what is now Miller Nash Graham & Dunn LLP. In 1893, he married Katherine S. Davis, and they had two sons. McCamant became a Master in Chancery for the United States District Court for the District of Oregon in 1904, serving until 1917. In 1909, he was president of the Portland chapter of the Sons of the American Revolution. He would serve as the President General of the Sons of the American Revolution from 1921 until 1922. During his private legal career McCamant appeared before the United States Supreme Court in Ross v. State of Oregon, 227 US 150 (1913). On January 8, 1917, McCamant was appointed to the Oregon Supreme Court to replace Robert Eakin by Oregon Governor James Withycombe. Eighteen months later, McCamant resigned on June 4, 1918, and was replaced by Charles A. Johns.

== Failed Court of Appeals nomination ==
McCamant received a recess appointment from President Calvin Coolidge on May 25, 1925, to a seat on the United States Court of Appeals for the Ninth Circuit vacated by Judge Erskine Mayo Ross. He was nominated to the same position by President Coolidge on December 8, 1925. The United States Senate rejected his nomination on March 17, 1926. His service terminated on May 2, 1926, due to his resignation, though he would have been eligible to continue serving until the sine die adjournment of the first session of the 69th United States Congress on July 3, 1926.

=== Circumstances of nomination failure ===
The lack of confirmation was partly due to McCamant’s support for Coolidge over Senator Hiram Johnson at the 1920 Republican Convention to select the Vice-Presidential nominee from the party. McCamant had been the delegate who first moved for the nomination of Coolidge after the Republican leadership had moved for and seconded Senator Irvine Lenroot of Wisconsin, which resulted in Coolidge's ascension to the Presidency upon Warren G. Harding's death. With the Senate not confirming McCamant, he became the first rejected recess appointment to a United States Court of Appeals.

== Later life ==
In 1922, McCamant dedicated the Theodore Roosevelt Rough Rider statue in Portland's South Park Blocks. On December 17, 1944, McCamant died and was buried at River View Cemetery in Portland.

Legal offices
Preceded by Erskine Mayo Ross	Judge of the United States Court of Appeals for the Ninth Circuit; 1925–1926	Succeeded by Frank Sigel Dietrich
