= Ruliff Stephen Holway =

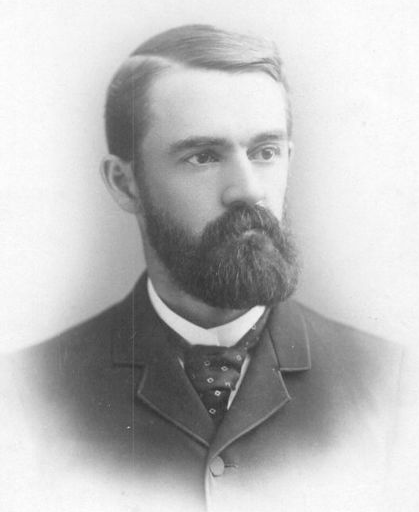
- Ruliff Stephen Holway in the 1880s
- Born: 4 May 1857; Hesper Township, Winneshiek County, Iowa, United States
- Died: 2 December 1927 (aged 70); Oakland, California, United States
- Occupation: Professor of Geography

Ruliff Stephen Holway (or Ruliff S. Holway; 4 May 1857 – 2 December 1927) was a professor of geography at the University of California, Berkeley, between 1904 and 1923.

== Life ==
Ruliff Stephen Holway was born on 8 May 1857 in Hesper Township, Winneshiek County, Iowa. His parents were George Newell Holway and Amy Maria Ellison. He studied at a normal school. In 1877 he married Florence L. Conger in Winneshiek County, Iowa.

Holway spent several years teaching in high schools and the California State Normal School (now San Jose State University) in San Jose. He married Mary Gordon in 1883 in San Francisco, California. He became interested in geography during a summer course taught by William Morris Davis at Harvard University, and may well have been influenced by Davis's interest in environmentalism. He went back to study at Stanford University and then to the University of California, where he earned a master's degree in 1904. He was immediately appointed assistant professor of physiography at the University of California at Berkeley. Holway succeeded George Davidson as professor of geography at Berkeley in 1905, and headed the department until he in turn retired in 1923.

The curriculum under Holway included physiography, meteorology, oceanography, mapping and commercial geography. Holway taught various courses that dealt with relations between humans and geography that reflected conventional views of his day. "General Physical Geography" covered "Land forms, climatology, oceanography, and planetary relations, and their effect upon human affairs". "Geographical Influences in the Western United States" covered "The geographic conditions which have influenced the exploration and early settlement of the west and the present effect of physical factors on the life of the people". "Geographic Influences in the Development of the United States" (1918) covered "the influence of topography and climate of the United States upon location of cities and trade routes and upon man and his activities".

Holway's second wife died in 1922. They had no children. He retired in 1923 and was succeeded by Carl O. Sauer. He married Laura Etta Ogden in 1923 in Oakland California. He died on 2 December 1927 in Oakland, California.

== Publications ==
Holway's publications included:

- Ruliff S. Holway (1904), "Eclogites in California", The Journal of Geology, 12 (4): 344–358
- Ruliff Stephen Holway (1905), Cold Water Belt Along the West Coast of the United States, The University Press, p. 286
- Andrew C. Lawson; Henry Fielding Reid; Grove Karl Gilbert; J.C. Branner; A.O Leuschner; George Davidson; Charles Burkhalter; W.W. Campbell; H.W. Fairbank; H.O. Wood; J.F. Hayford; A.L. Baldwin; F. Omori; R.S. Holway; A.S. Eakle; R. Crandall; G.F. Hoffman; G.A.Warring; E. Hughes; F.J. Rogers; A. Baird; Many others (1910). "The California Earthquake of April 18, 1906: Report of the State Earthquake Investigative Commission" (PDF). Carnegie Institution of Washington.
- Ruliff S. Holway (1911), "An Extension of the Known Area of Pleistocene Glaciation to the Coast Ranges of California", Bulletin of the American Geographical Society: 10, doi:10.2307/199318
- Ruliff S. Holway (1913), The Russian River, University of Calif. Press
- Ruliff S. Holway (1914), Preliminary Report on the Recent Volcanic Activity of Lassen Peak, University of California Press, p. 330
- Ruliff S. Holway (1914), Physiographically Unfinished Entrances to San Francisco Bay, University of California Press, p. 126
- Ruliff S. Holway (1914), The effect of seven years' erosion on the California fault line of 1906, New York
- Ruliff S. Holway (1915), The Volcanic Activity of Lassen Peak, California, p. 16
- Ruliff S. Holway (1917), The Russian River, a Characteristic Stream of the California Coast Ranges, University of California Press, p. 60
- Ruliff S. Holway (1921), Maps Illustrating the Special Properties of a Few Types of Projections: Prepared for Courses in Introductory Geography, University of California Press, p. 15

== Sources ==
- Annual Report - Carnegie Foundation for the Advancement of Teaching, vol. 23, Carnegie Foundation for the Advancement of Teaching, 1928
- Geography:History, University of California, Berkeley
- Keighren, Innes M. (2007), Reading the reception of Ellen Churchill Semple’s "Influences of geographic environment" (1911) (PDF) (thesis), The University of Edinburgh
