= Thomas G. Hailey =

American judge

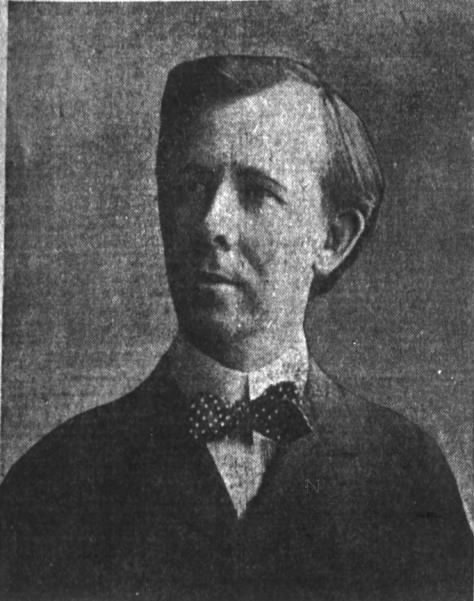

35th Justice of the Oregon Supreme Court
- In office 1905–1907
- Appointed by: George Earle Chamberlain
- Preceded by: Charles E. Wolverton
- Succeeded by: Robert Eakin

Personal details
- Born: July 13, 1865 La Grande, Oregon
- Died: March 6, 1908 (aged 42) Portland, Oregon
- Spouse: Maude G. Beach

Thomas G. Hailey (July 13, 1865 – March 6, 1908) was an American attorney and judge in Oregon. He was the 35th justice of the Oregon Supreme Court in the United States. Prior to appointment to Oregon’s high court he served as a district attorney in Eastern Oregon and as mayor of Pendleton, Oregon.

== Early life ==
Born in La Grande, Oregon on July 13, 1865, Thomas Hailey was the son of Louisa M. Griffin and John Hailey. After his birth the family moved to Boise, Idaho where Thomas received his primary education before he attended the University of Washington in Seattle, Washington (at the time both Washington and Idaho were territories). Also in Idaho Thomas’ father John was a politician, stage coach entrepreneur, the namesake for Hailey, Idaho, and served in Congress. Thomas also then attended Washington and Lee University, graduating with a B.L. While there, he was a member of the Fraternity of Delta Psi (aka St. Anthony Hall).

== Legal career ==
From 1889 until 1905 Hailey practiced law in Pendleton, where he also married in 1892 to Maude G. Beach. The couple had two daughters. Hailey served as both a district attorney in Pendleton for Oregon’s 6th Judicial District and as mayor of the town as a Democrat. In 1903, the Governor of Oregon appointed him to a committee to help devise new laws concerning water rights in the state.

On December 5, 1905, Hailey was appointed by Oregon Governor George Earle Chamberlain to the Oregon Supreme Court to replace Charles E. Wolverton who had resigned to take a federal court position. Hailey did not win election to a full six-year term and left the court on January 15, 1907.

== Later life ==
After leaving the court, Hailey moved to Portland, Oregon, where he died, after a long illness, on March 6, 1908.
