= Carolyn B. Shelton =

American politician (1876–1936)

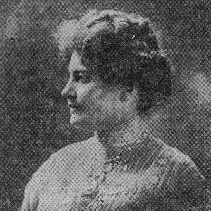
- Shelton in 1909

Governor of Oregon Acting
- In office February 27, 1909 – March 1, 1909
- Preceded by: George Earle Chamberlain
- Succeeded by: Frank W. Benson

Personal details
- Born: Carolyn Bertha Skiff; October 1876 Union County, Oregon, U.S.
- Died: July 26, 1936 (aged 59) Salem, Oregon, U.S.
- Party: Democratic
- Spouse(s): John W. Shelton (m. 1892; died 1894) George Chamberlain (m. 1926; died 1928)

Carolyn Bertha Shelton (née Skiff; October 1876 – July 26, 1936) was the long-serving private secretary of the governor of Oregon and United States senator George Earle Chamberlain. From February 27 to March 1, 1909, she served as acting governor in Chamberlain's absence, making her the first woman to serve as acting governor of a U.S. state. She performed only routine duties during that time. She and Chamberlain married in 1926, after the death of his first wife; he died two years later.

== Early life ==
Carolyn B. Skiff was born in October 1876 to Willis S. and Mary C. Skiff in Union County, Oregon. When Carolyn was nine years old, her father mysteriously disappeared while waiting for a midnight train home. Although the Pinkerton Detective Agency took on the case, he was never found. Her mother died just two years later. Skiff and her siblings, Nolan and Mabel, were placed in the care of her older brother Orrin and his wife, Elizabeth. A year later, local attorney John W. Shelton became the legal guardian of the children after unsuccessfully prosecuting her father's murder. At sixteen years old, Skiff married Shelton on October 27, 1892, in Weiser, Idaho. (Note: A judge later invalidated John W. Shelton's divorce from his first wife, Lila.) John died two years later.

== Career ==
A widow still in her teens, Carolyn Shelton became a stenographer at a law firm, Starr, Thomas and Chamberlain. Shelton excelled in the office, so much so that she was entrusted with drawing up legal documents, a task often assigned to young lawyers. She impressed George Earle Chamberlain, an attorney at the firm, and when he was elected district attorney for Multnomah County, he took Shelton with him as his private secretary. When Chamberlain was elected governor of Oregon in 1902, Shelton again went to work for him as his private secretary.

=== Acting Governor of Oregon ===
Shelton briefly served as acting governor of Oregon in 1909, making her the first woman to serve as governor in the United States. Shelton was still serving as Chamberlain's private secretary when he was elected to the United States Senate in 1908. He was to be sworn in as Senator on March 4, 1909, in Washington, D.C. Chamberlain left Oregon on February 27 even though his term was not slated to end until March 1, so that he could make the cross-country trip to Washington, D.C., and arrive on time to be sworn in with the rest of the incoming class of Senators. The governor-designate, Secretary of State Frank W. Benson, was sick in bed and unable to assume the office early, so Chamberlain left Shelton, his private secretary, to serve as governor over the weekend. It had been customary for governors to leave their private secretaries in charge when out of state for travel or otherwise unable to perform their duties, although prior to Shelton private secretaries to the governor had been men.

Shelton performed the routine duties of the governor, including requisitions and extradition matters. Shelton resolved not to grant any pardons because of her view that pardons should rarely be granted. No major activities were recorded during her short tenure as acting governor. She held this distinction three years before women in Oregon were given the right to vote. Some Oregonians referred to her as "Madam Governor" even after her brief tenure in office ended.

=== Work in Washington, D.C. ===
Shelton followed Chamberlain to Washington, D.C., where she once again worked as his secretary. Chamberlain's job as a Senator led to Shelton holding the position of clerk to the Military Affairs Committee of the Senate, a committee Chamberlain chaired. The Morning Oregonian reported Shelton was on the official roles as clerk to the Committee, drawing a salary of $2,500.00, even though she did not actually handle the Committee's business.

== Later life and death ==
On July 12, 1926, Shelton married Chamberlain in Norfolk, Virginia, one year after the passing of Chamberlain's first wife. George Chamberlain died two years later from effects of an earlier stroke. Following his death, Shelton returned to Union, Oregon. She died on July 26, 1936. She is buried in Arlington National Cemetery.

== See also ==
- List of governors of Oregon
- List of female governors in the United States
