= 1902 Oregon gubernatorial election =

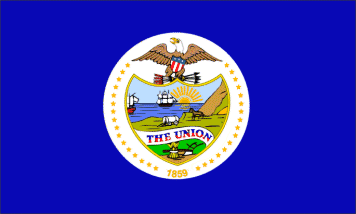
- June 2, 1902
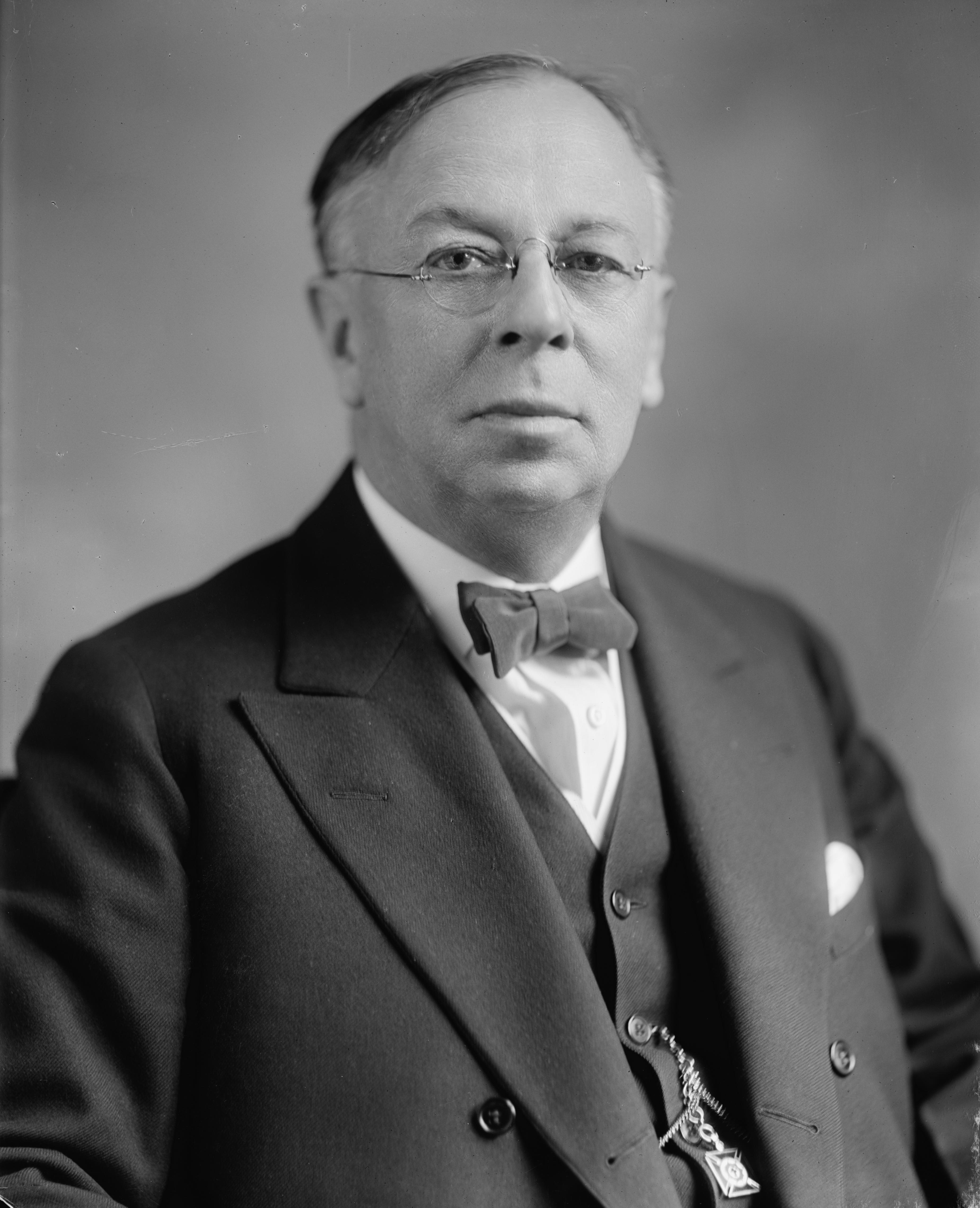

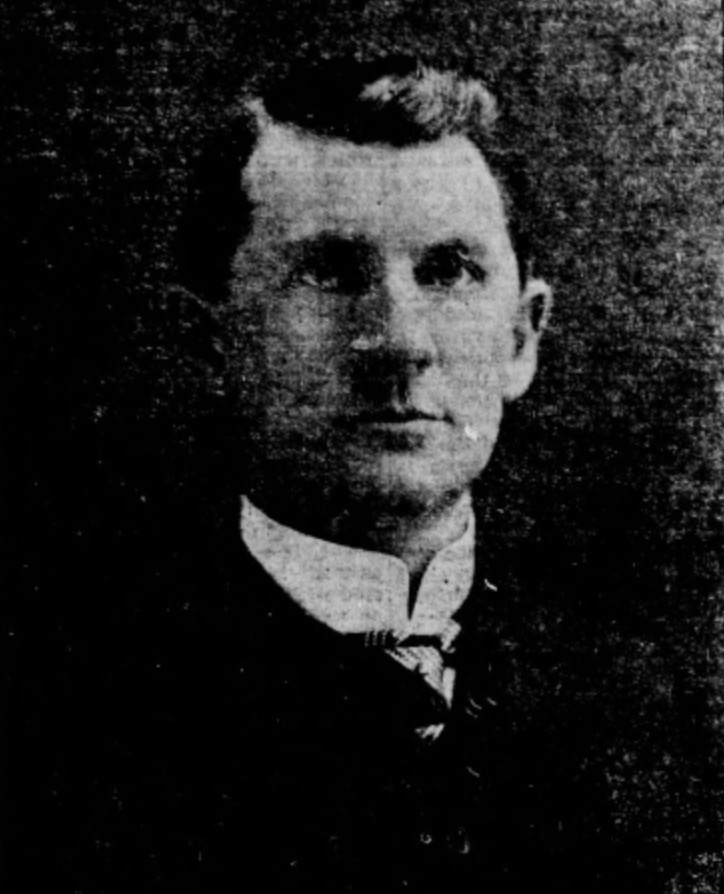
Nominee	George E. Chamberlain	W. J. Furnish
Party	Democratic	Republican
Popular vote	41,857	41,611
Percentage	46.17%	45.90%
- County results Chamberlain: 40–50% 50–60% Furnish: 40–50% 50–60% 60–70%
Governor before election
T. T. Geer
Republican
Elected Governor
George Earle Chamberlain
Democratic

The 1902 Oregon gubernatorial election took place on June 2, 1902, to elect the governor of the U.S. state of Oregon. The election matched Republican W. J. Furnish against Democrat George Earle Chamberlain.

The Republican Party nominating convention was held on April 2, 1902. Incumbent governor Theodore Thurston Geer and C. A. Johns of Baker City had withdrawn their candidacy, and mayor of Pendleton W. J. Furnish was nominated on the first ballot against H. E. Ankeny of Jackson County.

== Results ==
1902 Oregon gubernatorial election
Party	Candidate	Votes	%	±%
Democratic	George E. Chamberlain	41,857	46.17%	+5.40%
Republican	W. J. Furnish	41,611	45.90%	−7.32%
Socialist	R. Ryan	3,711	4.09%	
Prohibition	A. J. Hunsaker	3,483	3.84%	+1.22%
Total votes		90,662	100.00%	
Plurality		246	0.27%	
Democratic gain from Republican		Swing	+12.72%	

=== Results by county ===
Chamberlain was the first Democrat to carry Marion County since John Whiteaker in 1858. Wallowa County also voted Democratic for the first time in a gubernatorial election. This is one of only two gubernatorial elections in the 20th century where the winner failed to carry Clatsop County. (Note: The other instance was in 1958.)

County	George E. Chamberlain Democratic		W. J. Furnish Republican		R. Ryan Socialist		A. J. Hunsaker Prohibition		Margin		Total votes cast
County	#	%	#	%	#	%	#	%	#	%	Total votes cast
Baker	2,171	54.91%	1,590	40.21%	137	3.46%	56	1.42%	581	14.69%	3,954
Benton	842	44.93%	890	47.49%	49	2.61%	93	4.96%	-48	-2.56%	1,874
Clackamas	1,721	39.41%	2,113	48.39%	395	9.05%	138	3.16%	-392	-8.98%	4,367
Clatsop	997	44.13%	1,103	48.83%	107	4.74%	52	2.30%	-106	-4.69%	2,259
Columbia	485	34.89%	803	57.77%	68	4.89%	34	2.45%	-318	-22.88%	1,390
Coos	789	37.81%	1,066	51.08%	117	5.61%	115	5.51%	-277	-13.27%	2,087
Crook	538	45.32%	590	49.71%	47	3.96%	12	1.01%	-52	-4.38%	1,187
Curry	182	35.97%	312	61.66%	9	1.78%	3	0.59%	-130	-25.69%	506
Douglas	1,884	50.04%	1,693	44.97%	108	2.87%	80	2.12%	191	5.07%	3,765
Gilliam	396	43.81%	445	49.23%	22	2.43%	41	4.54%	-49	-5.42%	904
Grant	815	47.27%	820	47.56%	64	3.71%	25	1.45%	-5	-0.29%	1,724
Harney	424	45.35%	458	48.98%	45	4.81%	8	0.86%	-34	-3.64%	935
Jackson	1,625	47.07%	1,523	44.12%	182	5.27%	122	3.53%	102	2.95%	3,452
Josephine	769	41.66%	896	48.54%	118	6.39%	63	3.41%	127	6.88%	1,846
Klamath	414	43.53%	501	52.68%	23	2.42%	13	1.37%	-87	-9.15%	951
Lake	328	38.91%	491	58.24%	13	1.54%	11	1.30%	-163	-19.34%	843
Lane	2,172	44.40%	2,432	49.71%	131	2.68%	157	3.21%	-260	-5.31%	4,892
Lincoln	300	31.78%	518	54.87%	112	11.86%	14	1.48%	-218	-23.09%	944
Linn	2,061	48.59%	1,766	41.63%	184	4.34%	231	5.45%	295	6.95%	4,242
Malheur	549	48.58%	543	48.05%	18	1.59%	20	1.77%	6	0.53%	1,130
Marion	2,845	49.14%	2,523	43.58%	164	2.83%	258	4.46%	322	5.56%	5,790
Morrow	614	48.50%	559	44.15%	27	2.13%	66	5.21%	55	4.34%	1,266
Multnomah	8,222	48.06%	7,481	43.73%	912	5.33%	493	2.88%	741	4.33%	17,108
Polk	1,121	47.97%	1,001	42.83%	60	2.57%	155	6.63%	120	5.13%	2,337
Sherman	311	32.46%	527	55.01%	23	2.40%	97	10.13%	-216	-22.55%	958
Tillamook	412	35.70%	609	52.77%	51	4.42%	82	7.11%	-197	-17.07%	1,154
Umatilla	2,177	50.63%	1,911	44.44%	56	1.30%	156	3.63%	266	6.19%	4,300
Union	1,760	56.81%	1,060	34.22%	131	4.23%	147	4.74%	700	22.60%	3,098
Wallowa	823	59.38%	531	38.31%	9	0.65%	23	1.66%	292	21.07%	1,386
Wasco	1,174	40.96%	1,404	48.99%	129	4.50%	159	5.55%	-230	-8.03%	2,866
Washington	1,348	41.21%	1,611	49.25%	81	2.48%	231	7.03%	-263	-8.04%	3,271
Wheeler	282	37.95%	437	58.82%	7	0.94%	17	2.29%	-155	-20.86%	743
Yamhill	1,306	41.69%	1,404	44.81%	112	3.57%	311	9.93%	-98	-3.13%	3,133
Total	41,857	46.17%	41,611	45.90%	3,711	4.09%	3,483	3.84%	246	0.27%	90,662

==== Counties that flipped from Republican to Democratic ====
- Jackson
- Marion
- Morrow
- Multnomah
- Polk
- Umatilla
- Union
- Wallowa

==== Counties that flipped from Democratic to Republican ====
- Coos
- Harney
- Josephine
