= Robert Eakin =

American judge

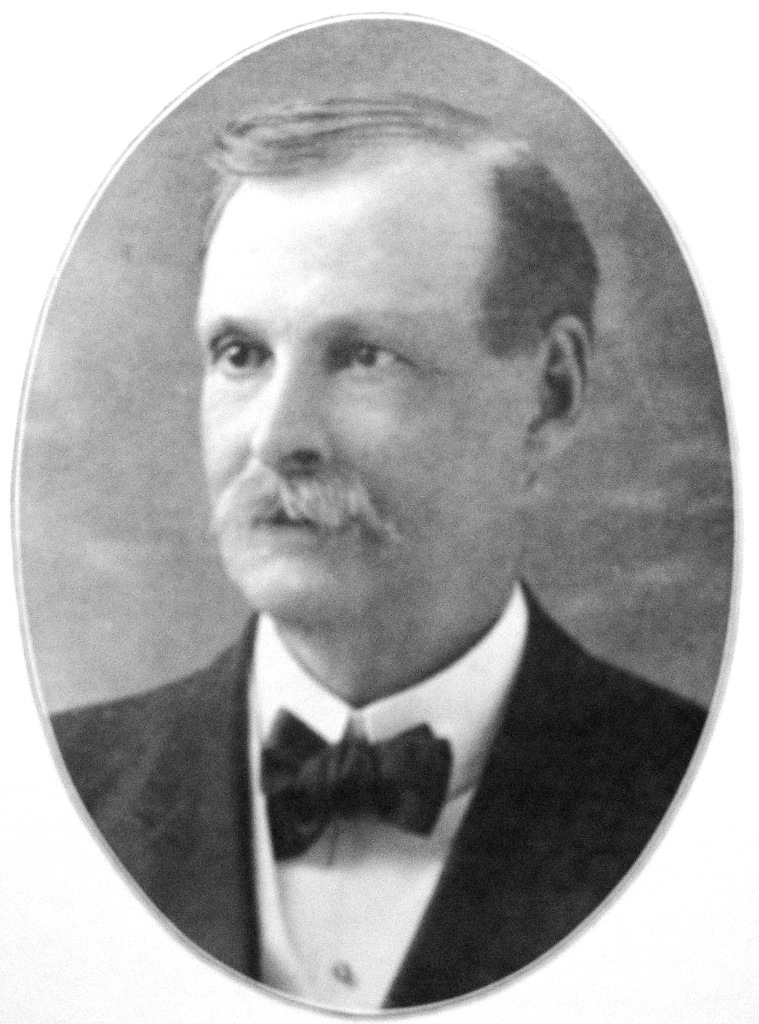
- Eakin circa 1910

19th Chief Justice of the Oregon Supreme Court
- In office 1911–1913
- Preceded by: Frank A. Moore
- Succeeded by: Thomas A. McBride

36th Justice of the Oregon Supreme Court
- In office 1907–1917
- Preceded by: Thomas G. Hailey
- Succeeded by: Wallace McCamant

Personal details
- Born: March 15, 1848 Illinois
- Died: October 1, 1917 (aged 69)
- Spouse: Nancy Walker

Robert Eakin (March 15, 1848 – October 1, 1917) was an American judge and attorney in the state of Oregon. He served as the 19th Chief Justice on the Oregon Supreme Court. Eakin was the head judge of the court from 1911 to 1913, and was on the court overall from 1907 until 1917.

== Early life ==
Eakin was born on March 15, 1848, in Kane County, Illinois. His parents, Stewart Bates Eakin and Catherine McEldowney Eakin, traveled the Oregon Trail to Oregon in 1866 along with his brother James A. Eakin. The family set down roots in the Eugene, Oregon area of the state. Robert Eakin attended Willamette University in Salem, Oregon, where he graduated in 1873. He then studied law in Eugene, and passed the bar in 1874.

== Legal career ==
Following his acceptance to the state bar, he entered private practice in Eastern Oregon in Union County. There he practiced from 1875 until 1895 when he became a judge for the state circuit court's 10th Judicial District. He served on that court until 1907.

In the fall of 1906 Eakin was elected to the Oregon Supreme Court to fill the position of Thomas G. Hailey, whose term expired in January 1907. Eakin won re-election to a second six-year term in 1912. Justice Eakin then served as chief justice of the state's highest court from 1911 to 1913, and then resigned on January 8, 1917, to be replaced by Wallace McCamant.

=== Opinions authored ===
- Stettler v. O'Hara, 69 Or 519, 139 P. 743 (1914) (labor laws)

== Family ==
Robert Eakin married in 1876 to the former Nancy Walker. They had four children together. Eakin's younger brother James also served as a circuit judge, but in Clatsop County, Oregon. Robert Eakin died on October 1, 1917.
