= James Withycombe =

15th Governor of Oregon

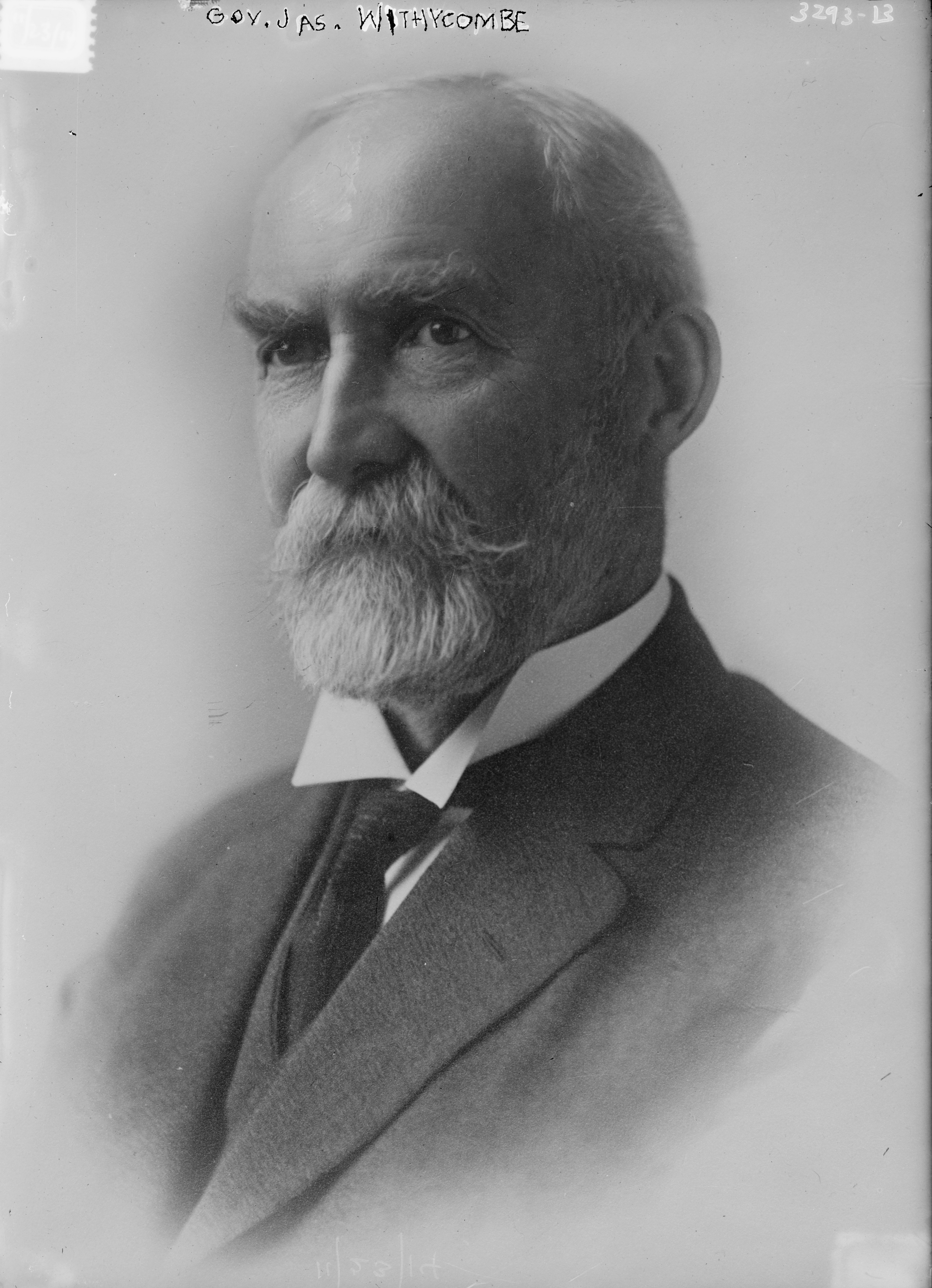

15th Governor of Oregon
- In office January 12, 1915 – March 3, 1919
- Preceded by: Oswald West
- Succeeded by: Ben W. Olcott

Personal details
- Born: March 21, 1854 Tavistock, West Devon, England
- Died: March 3, 1919 (aged 64) Salem, Oregon, U.S.
- Party: Republican
- Spouse: Isabel Carpenter (m. 1875)
- Education: Oregon State University
- Profession: Farmer

James Withycombe (March 21, 1854 – March 3, 1919) was an English-born American Republican politician who served as the 15th governor of Oregon.

== Biography ==
Withycombe was born to tenant farmers Thomas and Mary Ann Withycombe in Tavistock, England, in the United Kingdom of Great Britain and Ireland in 1854. Withycombe immigrated to the United States with his parents in 1871, settling on a farm near Hillsboro, Oregon. He worked on his father's farm for four years, and in 1873 Withycombe purchased his own 100-acre (0.40 km^{2}) parcel on the Horace Lindsay Land Claim, later expanding his holdings to 256 acres (1.04 km^{2}).

Agriculture became Withycombe's passion, becoming a prosperous livestock breeder and establishing a reputation as a successful scientific farmer. On June 6, 1875, in Washington County he married Isabell Carpenter, and the couple had a daughter and three sons together.

== Farmer and educator ==
His success led to his involvement in local farming organizations. He became a charter member of the Farmington Grange, and later became a leader in the state grange movement. From these platforms, Withycombe's efficient, innovative, and profitable farming methods became a model for farmers across the Pacific Northwest. His stature gained him an appointment as State Veterinarian in 1889, where he diligently worked to improve conditions of livestock health around the state.

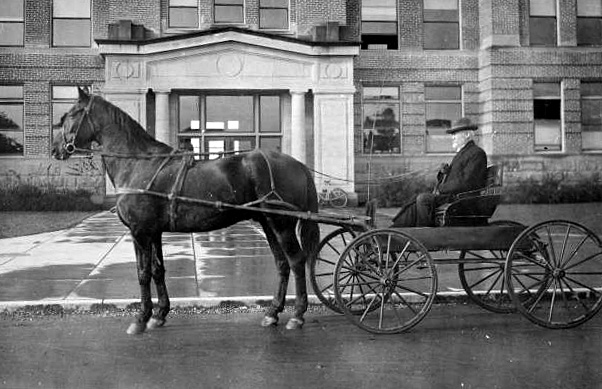
Withycombe in front of the OSU Ag Building

Although mostly self-educated, he was sought after by the Oregon Agricultural College at Corvallis (now Oregon State University) in 1898 to be the head of the college's experimental farming station. He received his master's degree in Agriculture 1891 from OAC. Using this position to advance Oregon agriculture, he played a major part in introducing alfalfa and clover to Eastern Oregon, laying the groundwork for the region's future agricultural economy.

Withycombe also became heavily involved in Oregon's agricultural industry, serving as president of the North Pacific Wool Growers and Northwest Sheep Breeders Associations. His tenureship on the board of the Oregon Academy of Sciences saw the dairy industry's profits rise from $2.5 million to $20 million. Such accomplishments built up respect for Withycombe statewide and gained the state Republican Party's attention.

== Governorship ==
Withycombe entered politics in the 1906 Oregon gubernatorial election. He won the Republican nomination in the primary but lost in the general election to incumbent Democratic governor George Earle Chamberlain. The 1910 gubernatorial election of controversial Democratic governor Oswald West energized Oregon Republicans, who tapped Withycombe for the 1914 gubernatorial race. He handily defeated challenger Charles Smith; the first Republican governor to assume office via election since T. T. Geer in 1903.

As Governor, James Withycombe vigorously promoted agricultural development. A notable proposal from his administration was to ask the Legislative Assembly to subsidize flax production as a prison industry.

The Withycombe Administration backed the "Good Roads" movement, creating the Oregon Highway Commission while in office. With the new commission in place, a large road-building program was initiated, establishing many of Oregon's modern state routes and highways.

Upon the U.S. entry into the First World War, Governor Withycombe took a vocal and patriotic position in support of the war effort. He encouraged volunteer military service, and promoted the state's war industries.

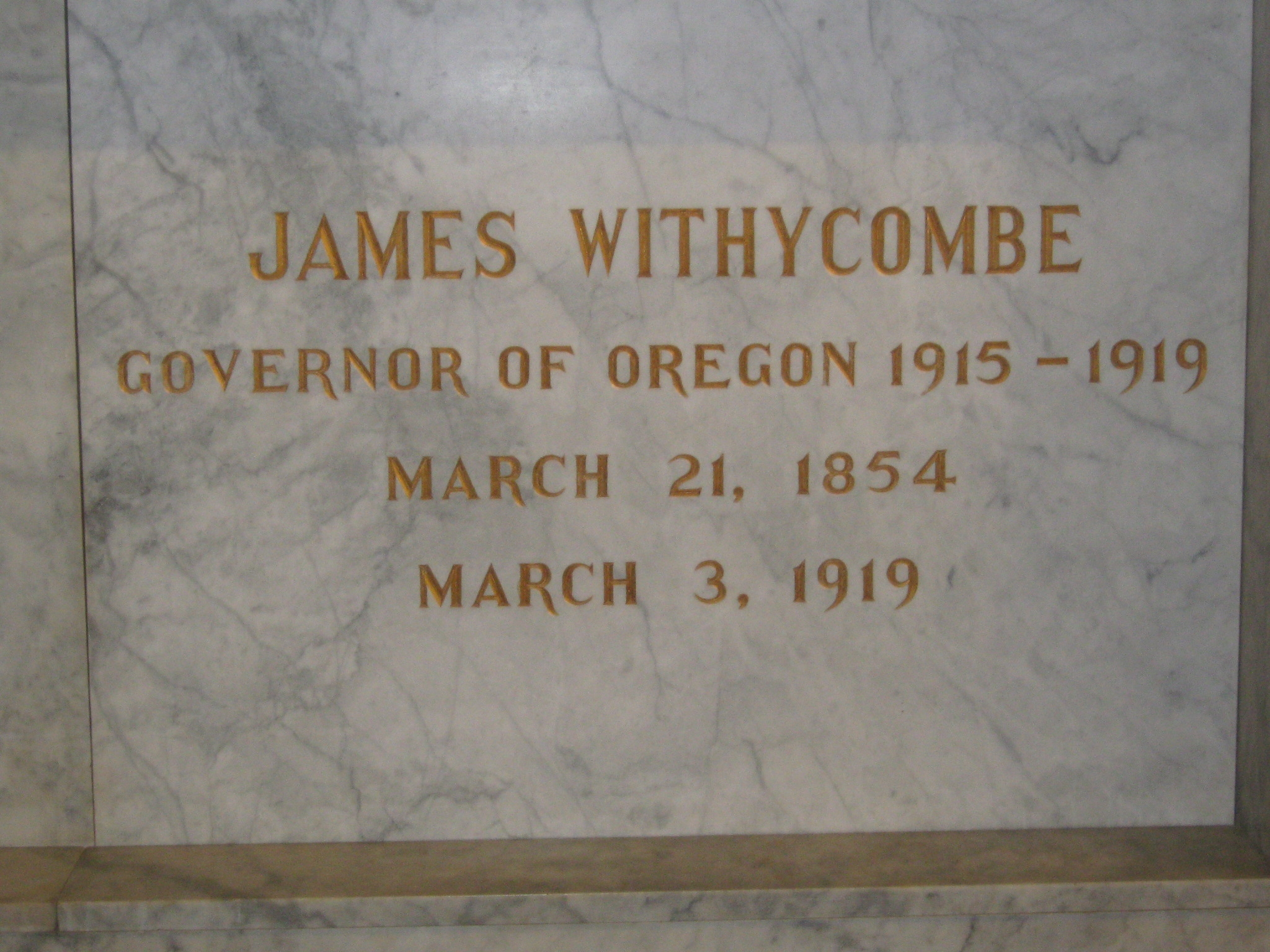
Withycombe's crypt in Salem

While in office, he took a strong position against labor unions. He spoke out publicly against the Industrial Workers of the World, claiming that it terrorized labor and would cripple industry following several instances of IWW threats to disrupt production in 1917. He organized veterans of the Spanish–American War into an Oregon State Defense force, and encouraged citizens in Eastern Oregon to form self-defence committees to defend the state against violent labor agitators. Withycombe used his powers as governor to prevent a shipyard strike in Astoria, by calling out the National Guard.

His 1918 reelection campaign capitalized on his wartime acts, portraying him as a wartime governor actively protecting the state and aiding the defense of the United States. These efforts gained him a second term, of which he only served two months.

== Death and legacy ==
Withycombe died in office of a heart condition on March 3, 1919, succeeded by Secretary of State Ben W. Olcott. He was interred in Mount Crest Abbey Mausoleum in City View Cemetery in Salem, Oregon.

Withycombe Hall at Oregon State University is named after him, as he was the head of the agricultural research station at OSU's predecessor (Oregon Agricultural College). The building is home to the Department of Animal and Rangeland Sciences, and it contains an auditorium used by the Theater Department.

Camp Withycombe, a military facility in Clackamas, was named for him.

== See also ==
- List of United States governors born outside the United States

Political offices
Preceded by Oswald West	Governor of Oregon; 1915–1919	Succeeded by Ben W. Olcott
Party political offices
Preceded by W. J. Furnish	Republican nominee for Governor of Oregon; 1906	Succeeded by Jay Bowerman
Preceded by Jay Bowerman	Republican nominee for Governor of Oregon; 1914, 1918	Succeeded by Ben W. Olcott
