= 1906 Oregon gubernatorial election =

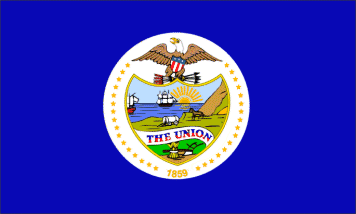
- June 4, 1906
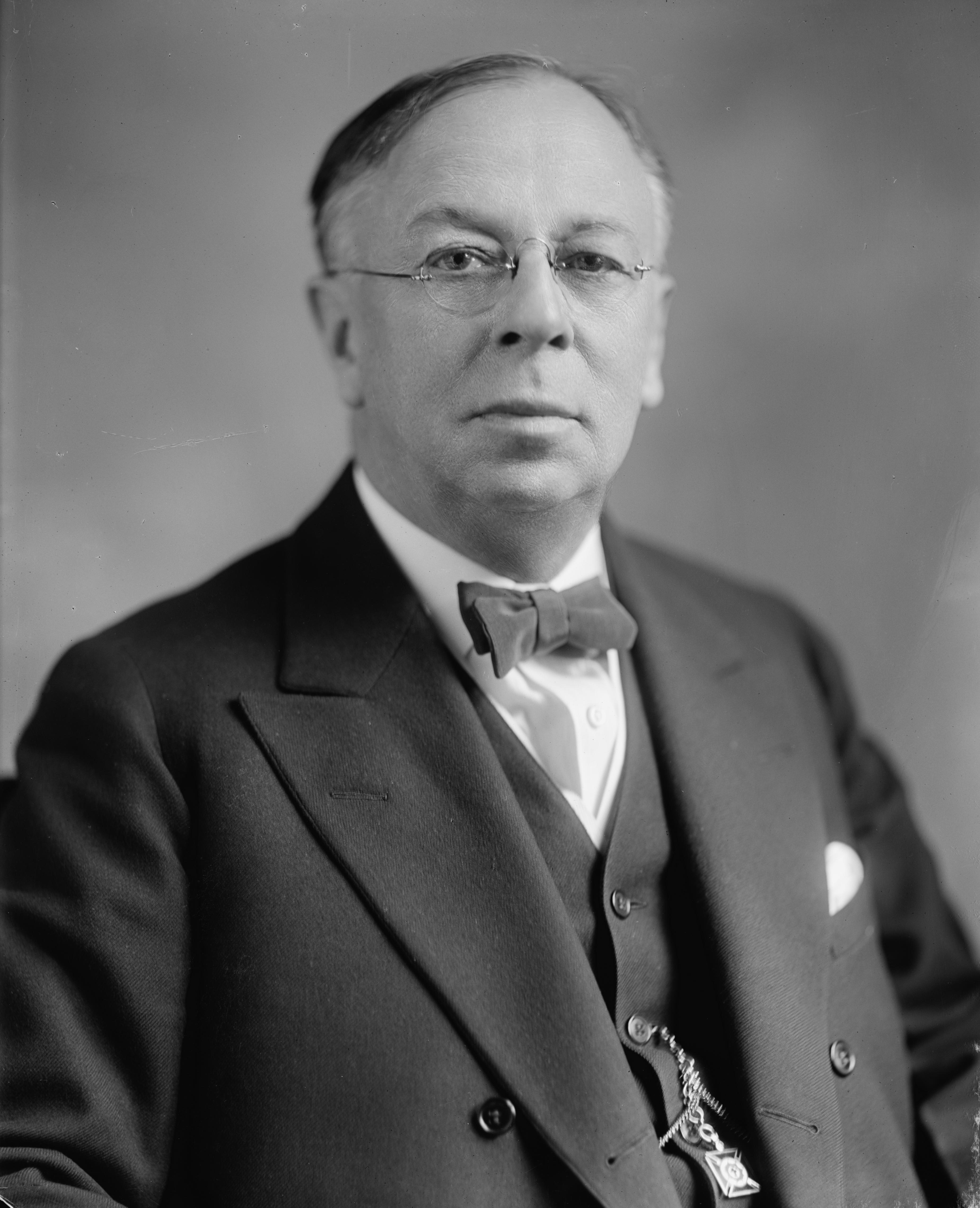

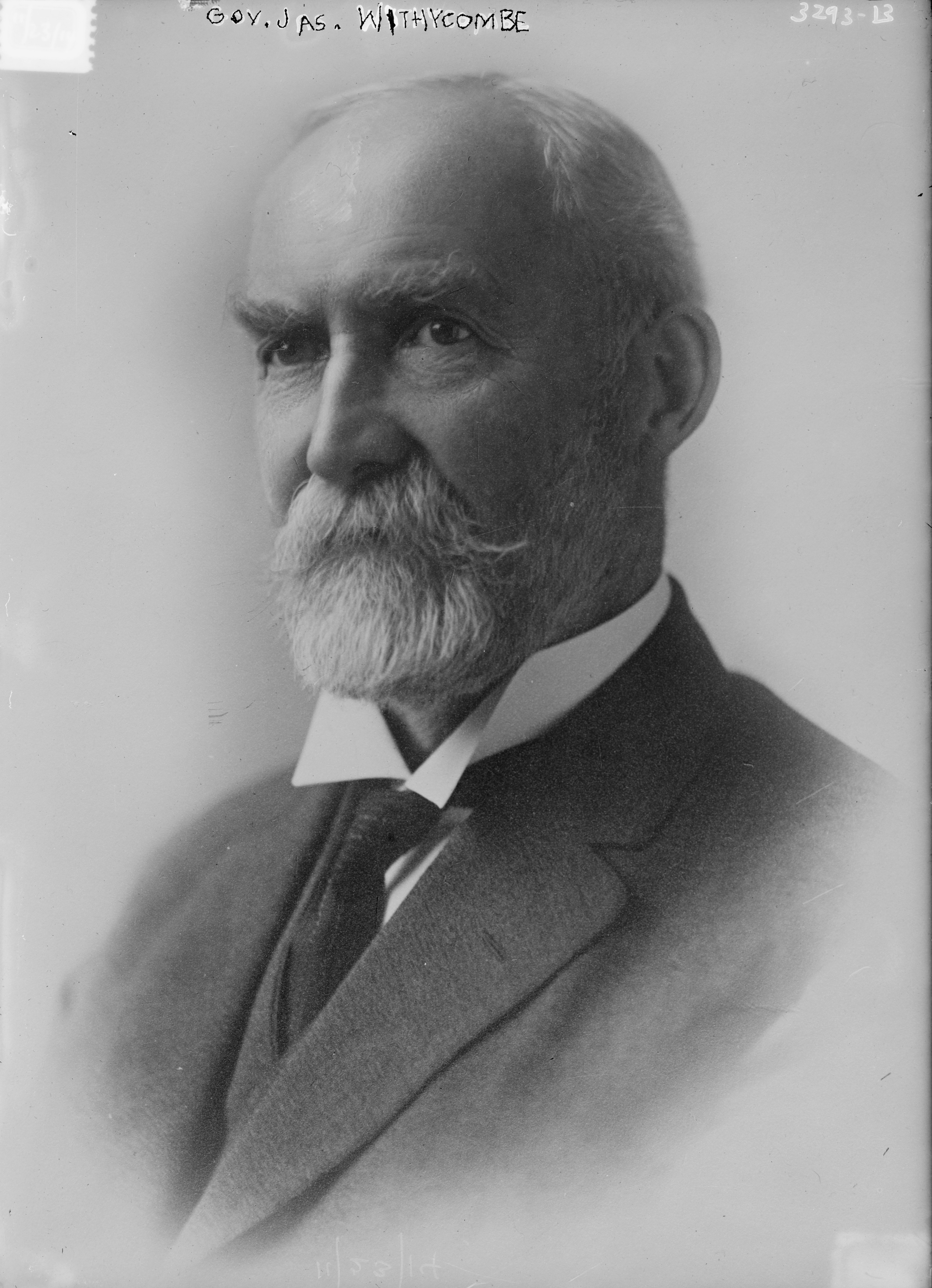
Nominee	George Earle Chamberlain	James Withycombe
Party	Democratic	Republican
Popular vote	46,002	43,508
Percentage	47.56%	44.99%
- County results Chamberlain: 40–50% 50–60% Withycombe: 40–50% 50–60%
Governor before election
George Earle Chamberlain
Democratic
Elected Governor
George Earle Chamberlain
Democratic

The 1906 Oregon gubernatorial election took place on June 4, 1906, to elect the governor of the U.S. state of Oregon. The election matched Republican James Withycombe against incumbent Democrat George Earle Chamberlain.

== Primary election ==
Oregon began using primary elections for nominations in 1906. The date of the primary election was April 20, 1906.

=== Democratic party ===
Incumbent governor George E. Chamberlain was renominated without opposition.

==== Candidates ====
- George E. Chamberlain, incumbent governor

==== Results ====
Democratic primary results
Party	Candidate	Votes	%
Democratic	George E. Chamberlain (inc.)	12,576	100.00%
Total votes		12,576	100.00%

=== Republican party ===
Businessman and farmer James Withycombe narrowly defeated former governor T. T. Geer for the Republican nomination.

==== Candidates ====
- Harvey K. Brown, sheriff of Baker County
- T. T. Geer, former governor
- Charles A. Johns, mayor of Baker City
- James Withycombe, businessman
- Charles A. Sehlbrede

==== Results ====
Republican primary results
Party	Candidate	Votes	%
Republican	James Withycombe	14,175	32.89%
Republican	T. T. Geer	13,912	32.28%
Republican	Charles A. Johns	7,879	18.28%
Republican	Harvey K. Brown	5,298	12.29%
Republican	Charles A. Sehlbrede	1,832	4.25%
Total votes		43,096	100.00%

== General election ==
=== Candidates ===
- George E. Chamberlain, Democratic
- James Withycombe, Republican
- I. H. Amos, Prohibtion
- C. W. Barzee, Socialist

=== Results ===
1906 Oregon gubernatorial election
Party	Candidate	Votes	%	±%
Democratic	George E. Chamberlain (inc.)	46,002	47.56%	+1.40%
Republican	James Withycombe	43,508	44.99%	−0.91%
Socialist	C. W. Barzee	4,468	4.62%	+0.53%
Prohibition	I. H. Amos	2,737	2.83%	−1.01%
Total votes		96,715	100.00%	
Plurality		2,494	2.58%	
Democratic hold		Swing	+2.31%	

=== Results by county ===
Chamberlain was the first Democrat to carry Yamhill County since La Fayette Grover in 1874.

County	George E. Chamberlain Democratic		James Withycombe Republican		C. W. Barzee Socialist		I. H. Amos Prohibition		Margin		Total votes cast
County	#	%	#	%	#	%	#	%	#	%	Total votes cast
Baker	2,135	54.79%	1,443	37.03%	277	7.11%	42	1.08%	692	17.76%	3,897
Benton	869	40.70%	1,166	54.61%	33	1.55%	67	3.14%	-297	-13.91%	2,135
Clackamas	2,396	51.28%	1,954	41.82%	227	4.86%	95	2.03%	442	9.46%	4,672
Clatsop	1,324	51.18%	1,098	42.44%	125	4.83%	40	1.55%	226	8.74%	2,587
Columbia	709	40.68%	854	49.00%	115	6.60%	65	3.73%	-145	-8.32%	1,743
Coos	1,037	38.31%	1,195	44.14%	348	12.86%	127	4.69%	-158	-5.84%	2,707
Crook	848	52.35%	639	39.44%	87	5.37%	46	2.84%	209	12.90%	1,620
Curry	205	45.35%	218	48.23%	23	5.09%	6	1.33%	-13	-2.88%	452
Douglas	1,937	48.85%	1,775	44.77%	209	5.27%	44	1.11%	162	4.09%	3,965
Gilliam	506	51.95%	424	43.53%	22	2.26%	22	2.26%	82	8.42%	974
Grant	826	53.85%	623	40.61%	51	3.32%	34	2.22%	203	13.23%	1,534
Harney	417	50.67%	354	43.01%	43	5.22%	9	1.09%	63	7.65%	823
Jackson	1,601	43.74%	1,744	47.65%	210	5.74%	105	2.87%	-143	-3.91%	3,660
Josephine	777	40.68%	906	47.43%	179	9.37%	48	2.51%	-129	-6.75%	1,910
Klamath	555	46.37%	579	48.37%	49	4.09%	14	1.17%	-24	-2.01%	1,197
Lake	352	49.93%	328	46.52%	15	2.13%	10	1.42%	24	3.40%	705
Lane	2,417	48.33%	2,196	43.91%	239	4.78%	149	2.98%	221	4.42%	5,001
Lincoln	432	40.83%	539	50.95%	74	6.99%	13	1.23%	-107	-10.11%	1,058
Linn	2,383	51.77%	1,866	40.54%	214	4.65%	140	3.04%	517	11.23%	4,603
Malheur	678	45.81%	706	47.70%	53	3.58%	43	2.91%	-28	-1.89%	1,480
Marion	2,903	48.24%	2,763	45.91%	142	2.36%	210	3.49%	140	2.33%	6,018
Morrow	532	44.59%	529	44.34%	88	7.38%	44	3.69%	3	0.25%	1,193
Multnomah	9,214	47.76%	9,013	46.71%	650	3.37%	417	2.16%	201	1.04%	19,294
Polk	1,297	48.27%	1,193	44.40%	116	4.32%	81	3.01%	104	3.87%	2,687
Sherman	369	40.77%	416	45.97%	29	3.20%	91	10.06%	-47	-5.19%	905
Tillamook	459	43.22%	475	44.73%	88	8.29%	40	3.77%	-16	-1.51%	1,062
Umatilla	1,763	45.40%	1,834	47.23%	164	4.22%	122	3.14%	-71	-1.83%	3,883
Union	1,552	50.21%	1,298	41.99%	178	5.76%	63	2.04%	254	8.22%	3,091
Wallowa	676	47.37%	639	44.78%	76	5.33%	36	2.52%	37	2.59%	1,427
Wasco	1,460	45.57%	1,421	44.35%	161	5.02%	162	5.06%	39	1.22%	3,204
Washington	1,444	46.87%	1,475	47.87%	44	1.43%	118	3.83%	-31	-1.01%	3,081
Wheeler	333	44.94%	364	49.12%	20	2.70%	24	3.24%	-31	-4.18%	741
Yamhill	1,596	46.86%	1,481	43.48%	119	3.49%	210	6.17%	115	3.38%	3,406
Total	46,002	47.56%	43,508	44.99%	4,468	4.62%	2,737	2.83%	2,494	2.58%	96,715

==== Counties that flipped from Republican to Democratic ====
- Clackamas
- Clatsop
- Crook
- Gilliam
- Grant
- Harney
- Lake
- Lane
- Wasco
- Yamhill

==== Counties that flipped from Democratic to Republican ====
- Jackson
- Malheur
- Umatilla
