= 1910 Oregon gubernatorial election =

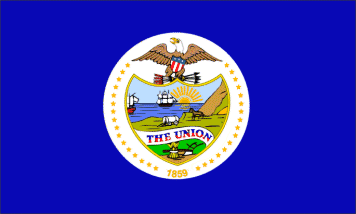
- November 8, 1910
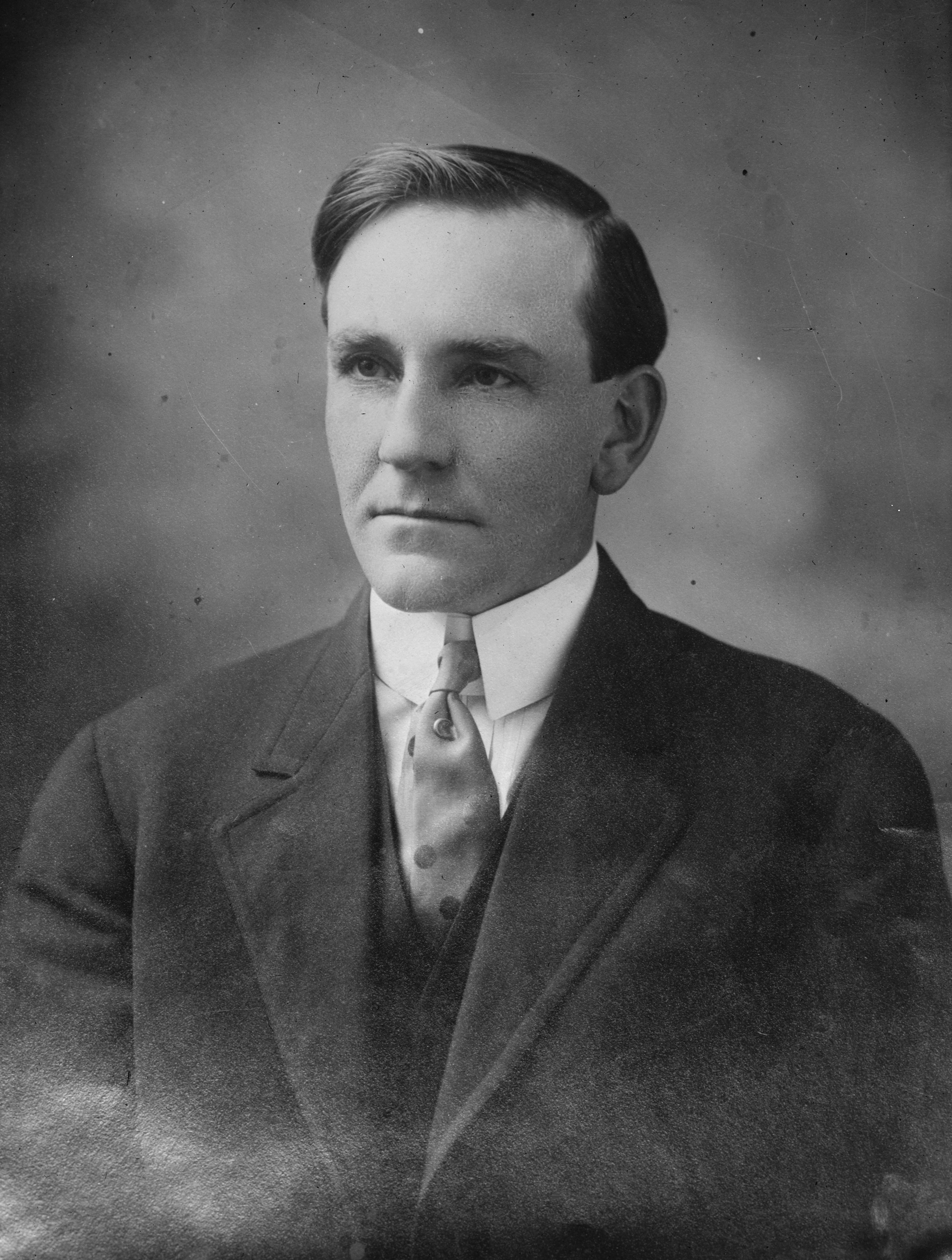

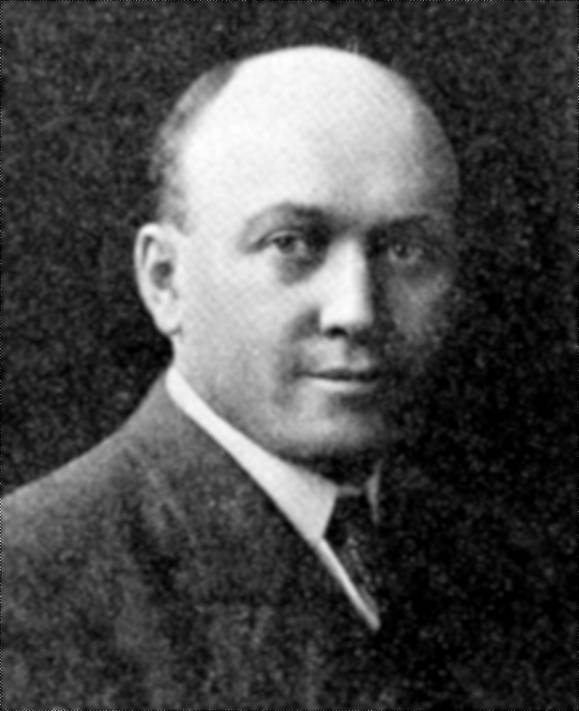
Nominee	Oswald West	Jay Bowerman
Party	Democratic	Republican
Popular vote	54,853	48,751
Percentage	46.61%	41.42%
Nominee	W. S. Richards	A. E. Eaton
Party	Socialist	Prohibition
Popular vote	8,040	6,046
Percentage	6.83%	5.14%
- County results West: 40–50% 50–60% Bowerman: 40–50% 50–60%
Governor before election
Jay Bowerman
Republican
Elected Governor
Oswald West
Democratic

The 1910 Oregon gubernatorial election took place on November 8, 1910, to elect the governor of the U.S. state of Oregon. The election matched incumbent Republican Jay Bowerman against Democratic challenger Oswald West. In the election, approximately 118,442 ballots were cast.

After the resignations of George Chamberlain (to take up a Senate seat) and Frank W. Benson (due to illness), then President of the Oregon Senate Jay Bowerman took up the role as Governor for the remainder of the term. Bowerman sought election as governor in his own right on a platform advocating modernization of highways, economies in government administration, and tight control of state land management.

Oswald West, a former agent of State Land Board and then member of the Oregon Railroad Commission, won the Democratic primary on the back of his good reputation on both offices. As an agent of the State Land Board, he helped recover thousands of acres that had been fraudulently obtained with the help of corrupt officials. As an agent of the Railroad Commission, he was popular and had enough public clout to win his party's nomination.

Despite Oregon being a mostly Republican state at the time, Bowerman was defeated by his Democratic opponent after being labeled an opponent of direct government. Bowerman was nominated by the Republican Party in assembly despite the fact that Oregonians had adopted a direct primary law prohibiting party nominating conventions.

Two minor candidates, a Socialist and Prohibitionist, took about twelve percent of the vote between themselves.

== Primary election ==
Oregon held primary elections on September 24, 1910.

=== Republican party ===
Although opposed to the direct primary system, incumbent governor Jay Bowerman won the Republican primary over county judge Grant Dimick.

==== Candidates ====
- Albert Abraham
- Jay Bowerman, incumbent governor
- Grant Dimick, Clackamas County judge and former mayor of Oregon City
- E. Hofer, editor of The Capital Journal

==== Results ====
Republican primary results
Party	Candidate	Votes	%
Republican	Jay Bowerman (inc.)	16,735	44.82%
Republican	Grant Dimick	13,751	36.83%
Republican	Albert Abraham	6,184	16.56%
Republican	E. Hofer	665	1.78%
Total votes		37,335	100.00%

=== Democratic party ===
Oswald West defeated Jefferson Myers for the Democratic nomination.

==== Candidates ====
- Oswald West, member of Oregon Railroad Commission
- Jefferson Myers, member of Oregon State Senate

==== Results ====
Democratic primary results
Party	Candidate	Votes	%
Democratic	Oswald West	6,693	65.39%
Democratic	Jefferson Myers	3,543	34.61%
Total votes		10,236	100.00%

== General election ==
=== Candidates ===
- Jay Bowerman, Republican
- Oswald West, Democratic
- A. E. Eaton, Prohibition
- W. S. Richards, Socialist

=== Results ===
1910 Oregon gubernatorial election (Note: The Secretary of State's report transposes the results for Richards and Eaton in Sherman County and gives their totals as 8,059 and 6,027, respectively. However, the official results are those as canvassed by the Legislative Assembly.)
Party	Candidate	Votes	%	±%
Democratic	Oswald West	54,853	46.61%	−0.96%
Republican	Jay Bowerman (inc.)	48,751	41.42%	−3.56%
Socialist	W. S. Richards	8,040	6.83%	+2.21%
Prohibition	A. E. Eaton	6,046	5.14%	+2.31%
Total votes		117,960	100.00%	
Plurality		6,102	5.18%	
Democratic gain from Republican		Swing	+2.61%	

=== Results by county ===
Lincoln County voted Democratic for the first time in this election. Curry County also voted Democratic for the first time since 1878.

County	Oswald West Democratic		Jay Bowerman Republican		W. S. Richards Socialist		A. E. Eaton Prohibition		Margin		Total votes cast
County	#	%	#	%	#	%	#	%	#	%	Total votes cast
Baker	1,705	46.96%	1,440	39.66%	293	8.07%	193	5.32%	265	7.30%	3,631
Benton	1,162	54.68%	784	36.89%	58	2.73%	121	5.69%	378	17.79%	2,125
Clackamas	3,025	53.15%	2,084	36.62%	316	5.55%	266	4.67%	941	16.53%	5,691
Clatsop	1,436	55.77%	914	35.50%	175	6.80%	50	1.94%	522	20.27%	2,575
Columbia	647	34.27%	926	49.05%	225	11.92%	90	4.77%	-279	-14.78%	1,888
Coos	1,346	38.26%	1,449	41.19%	574	16.32%	149	4.24%	-103	-2.93%	3,518
Crook	899	48.97%	764	41.61%	121	6.59%	52	2.83%	135	7.35%	1,836
Curry	294	57.20%	176	34.24%	32	6.23%	12	2.33%	118	22.96%	514
Douglas	1,913	44.09%	1,868	43.05%	396	9.13%	162	3.73%	45	1.04%	4,339
Gilliam	361	43.55%	440	53.08%	18	2.17%	10	1.21%	-79	-9.53%	829
Grant	562	46.79%	523	43.55%	90	7.49%	26	2.16%	39	3.25%	1,201
Harney	517	47.52%	475	43.66%	75	6.89%	21	1.93%	42	3.86%	1,088
Hood River	449	39.04%	565	49.13%	64	5.57%	72	6.26%	-116	-10.09%	1,150
Jackson	2,556	56.51%	1,256	27.77%	478	10.57%	233	5.15%	1,300	28.74%	4,523
Josephine	821	40.70%	877	43.48%	217	10.76%	102	5.06%	-56	-2.78%	2,017
Klamath	687	39.71%	799	46.18%	164	9.48%	80	4.62%	-112	-6.47%	1,730
Lake	367	38.55%	484	50.84%	58	6.09%	43	4.52%	-117	-12.29%	952
Lane	2,602	41.85%	2,725	43.83%	504	8.11%	386	6.21%	-123	-1.98%	6,217
Lincoln	620	49.68%	463	37.10%	130	10.42%	35	2.80%	157	12.58%	1,248
Linn	2,502	53.48%	1,675	35.81%	297	6.35%	204	4.36%	827	17.68%	4,678
Malheur	741	44.80%	728	44.01%	90	5.44%	95	5.74%	13	0.79%	1,654
Marion	3,751	50.92%	2,795	37.94%	297	4.03%	524	7.11%	956	12.98%	7,367
Morrow	310	31.03%	574	57.46%	73	7.31%	42	4.20%	-264	-26.43%	999
Multnomah	14,796	46.77%	13,498	42.66%	1,885	5.96%	1,460	4.61%	1,298	4.10%	31,639
Polk	1,577	53.58%	1,083	36.80%	148	5.03%	135	4.59%	494	16.79%	2,943
Sherman	295	39.39%	393	52.47%	21	2.80%	40	5.34%	-98	-13.08%	749
Tillamook	590	45.63%	499	38.59%	124	9.59%	80	6.19%	91	7.04%	1,293
Umatilla	1,905	43.75%	2,022	46.44%	205	4.71%	222	5.10%	-117	-2.69%	4,354
Union	1,295	43.05%	1,197	39.79%	241	8.01%	275	9.14%	98	3.26%	3,008
Wallowa	731	45.55%	647	40.31%	134	8.35%	93	5.79%	84	5.23%	1,605
Wasco	1,021	43.23%	1,058	44.79%	159	6.73%	124	5.25%	-37	-1.57%	2,362
Washington	1,596	40.88%	1,855	47.52%	183	4.69%	270	6.92%	-259	-6.63%	3,904
Wheeler	248	42.32%	321	54.78%	9	1.54%	8	1.37%	-73	-12.46%	586
Yamhill	1,526	43.89%	1,394	40.09%	186	5.35%	371	10.67%	132	3.80%	3,477
Total	54,853	46.61%	48,751	41.42%	8,040	6.83%	6,046	5.14%	6,102	5.18%	117,690

==== Counties that flipped from Republican to Democratic ====
- Benton
- Curry
- Jackson
- Lincoln
- Malheur
- Tillamook

==== Counties that flipped from Democratic to Republican ====
- Gilliam
- Lake
- Lane
- Morrow
- Wasco
