= Charles A. Johns =

American judge

The Honourable Charles A. Johns
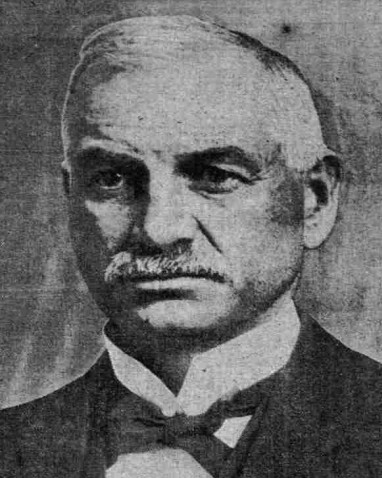
- Johns circa 1914

47th Justice of the Oregon Supreme Court
- In office 1918–1921
- Preceded by: Wallace McCamant
- Succeeded by: John McCourt

23rd Associate Justice of the Supreme Court of the Philippines
- In office October 7, 1921 – January 11, 1932
- Appointed by: Warren G. Harding
- Preceded by: Percy Moir
- Succeeded by: John A. Hull

Personal details
- Born: June 25, 1857 Jackson County, Missouri
- Died: January 11, 1932 (aged 74) Philippine Islands
- Party: Republican
- Spouse(s): Mabel Ellis; Elizabeth Busch

Charles A. Johns (June 25, 1857 – January 11, 1932) was an American lawyer, jurist and politician who served as the 47th justice of the Oregon Supreme Court. Johns also served as mayor of Baker City in Eastern Oregon and as an associate justice of the Supreme Court of the Philippines while that archipelago was under U.S. jurisdiction.

== Early life ==
Charles Johns was born to James McClellan Johns and Elizabeth Ann Darby Johns in Jackson County, Missouri. In 1858, the family immigrated to the Oregon Territory and settled in the Willamette Valley. Charles was then educated in the local schools of Marion and Linn counties. For college he attended Willamette University in Salem, where he graduated in 1878 with his Bachelor of Arts. He was admitted to the bar in 1881. The following year Johns married Mabel Ellis with whom he fathered three children. He would also have three children by his second wife Elizabeth Busch.

== Political career ==
After being accepted to practice law, Johns then became a judge in Polk County, Oregon, in the Willamette Valley from 1883 to 1885 and served as mayor of Baker City in Eastern Oregon from 1900 to 1908. He was also a lieutenant colonel on the staff of Oregon Governor Theodore Thurston Geer. In 1912, Charles Johns moved to Portland, Oregon, where he practiced law.

On June 4, 1918, Johns was appointed to the Oregon Supreme Court to replace Wallace McCamant by Governor James Withycombe after McCamant resigned. Johns then won election to a full six-year term that same year, but resigned on October 7, 1921, following his appointment to the Supreme Court of the Philippines by U.S. President Warren G. Harding. In 1924, he served as a delegate to the Republican National Convention from Philippines. Johns served on the Philippine court until dying in office on January 11, 1932, at the age of 74.

| Preceded by Percy M. Moir | Associate Justice of the Supreme Court; 1921–1932 | Succeeded by John A. Hull |
