= Robert A. Miller (Oregon politician) =

American politician

Member of the Oregon House of Representatives
- In office 1887–1890
- Constituency: Jackson County

Personal details
- Born: October 22, 1854 Lane County, Oregon
- Died: October 8, 1941 (aged 86) Oregon
- Party: Democrat
- Spouse: Sarelia W. Grubbe
- Education: University of the Pacific; Willamette University

Robert Aubrey Miller (October 22, 1854 – October 8, 1941) was an American attorney and Democratic Party politician in the state of Oregon. Born in Oregon, he served in the Oregon House of Representatives and as an aide to Governor Sylvester Pennoyer.

== Early life ==
Robert Miller was born in Lane County, Oregon, near the city of Eugene on October 22, 1854. The son of Elizabeth Ann Miller (née Aubrey) and James Naper Tandy Miller, he attended the local public schools of Jacksonville, Oregon. Miller then attended the University of the Pacific in San Jose, California, from 1874 to 1875 before returning to Oregon where he graduated from Willamette University in Salem. On March 7, 1887, Miller was admitted to the Oregon bar.

== Political career ==
In 1886, he was elected as a Democrat to serve in the Oregon House of Representatives. He won re-election in 1888, serving a second term representing District 19 in Southern Oregon's Jackson County. Miller was then appointed as an aide to Oregon Governor Sylvester Pennoyer in the position of Lieutenant-Colonel, serving six years in the post.

In 1890, he ran as the Democratic Party candidate for the 52nd United States Congress from Oregon's at-large congressional district. Miller lost to incumbent Republican Binger Hermann in the November election, though Democrats picked up 78 seats in the U.S. House in that election. In 1892, he was a presidential elector for the Democrats, and then from 1893 to 1897 was the registrar at the United States Land Office in Oregon City. In 1938, Miller was the Democratic candidate in a special United States Senate election to complete the term of Frederick Steiwer, who had resigned. Miller lost the election to Republican Alexander G. Barry.

== Later years ==
In May 1893, he passed the Supreme Court of the United States bar, followed by the federal bar in Oregon in 1904. On September 11, 1893, he married Sarelia W. Grubbe. In 1890, he received a diploma from the New York Chautauqua, a correspondence school. Known as Colonel Bob Miller, he helped set up the Chautauqua system in the Pacific Northwest. By 1910 he had moved to Portland and entered private legal practice. In Portland, he was involved in the Commercial Societies A.F. & A.M., the National Geographic Society, the Masons, and the Scottish Rite. Colonel Robert Miller died in Portland on October 8, 1941, at the age of 86.
