= Oswald West =

14th Governor of Oregon

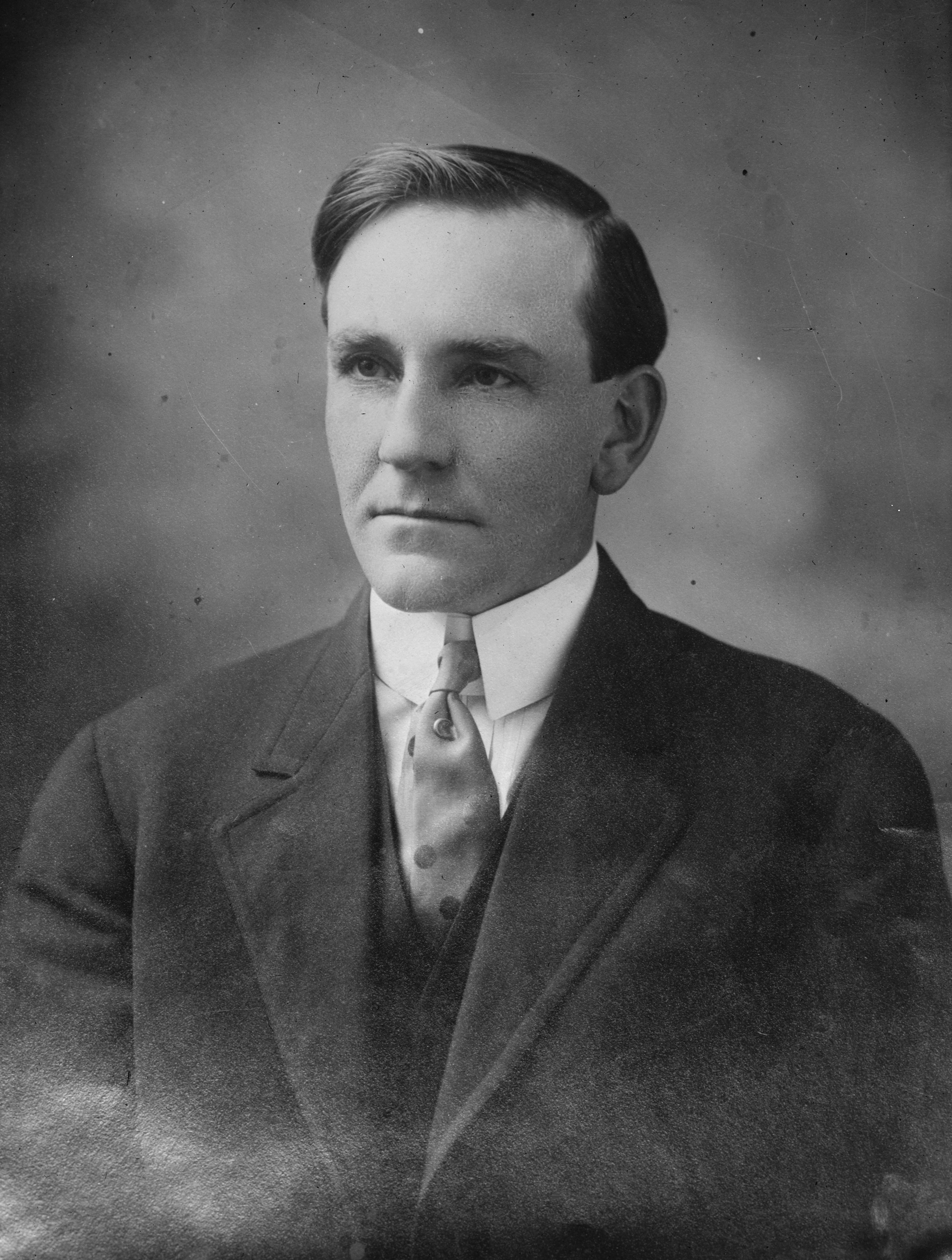

14th Governor of Oregon
- In office January 11, 1911 – January 12, 1915
- Preceded by: Jay Bowerman
- Succeeded by: James Withycombe

Personal details
- Born: May 20, 1873 Guelph, Ontario, Canada
- Died: August 22, 1960 (aged 87) Portland, Oregon, U.S.
- Party: Democratic
- Spouse: Mabel West
- Profession: Banker and lawyer

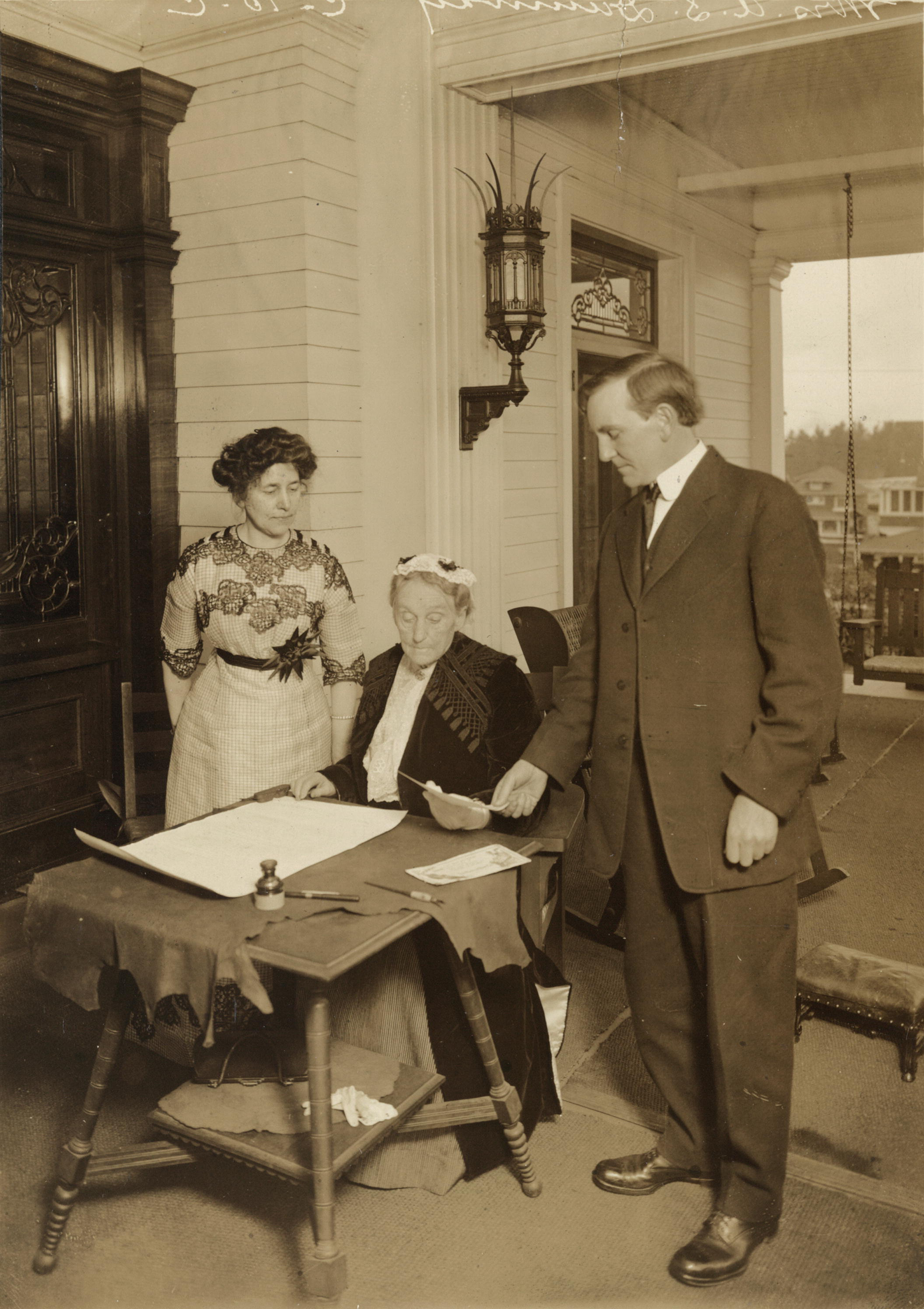
Abigail Scott Duniway (seated) with Governor Oswald West, signing the women's suffrage amendment

Oswald West (May 20, 1873 – August 22, 1960) was an American businessman, lawyer, and politician who served as the 14th governor of Oregon from 1911 to 1915. A member of the Democratic Party, West supported progressive reforms like women's suffrage and prohibition. He is also noted for his conservation policies, including the creation of statewide forestry and wildlife management bodies, as well as the protection of Oregon’s ocean beaches for public use.

== Early life ==
West was born in Guelph, Ontario, Canada but moved to Salem, Oregon with his family at the age of four where he attended school and eventually went into banking. After several years as a banker in Salem and Astoria, and a six-month stint searching for gold in Alaska, West gained an appointment as the State Land Agent. He proved effective in his position, recovering almost 1 million acres (4,000 km²) of fraudulently held state land.

In 1907, West left his position as land agent and was appointed to the Oregon Railroad Commission, where he again found a great deal of success.

== Governor of Oregon ==
In 1910, he gained the Democratic nomination for Governor and went on to defeat his opponent, Jay Bowerman, and take office in 1911. While in office, West defended what he called the Oregon System which included initiative and referendum systems still in use in many western American states today. Through these processes women's suffrage, various workers rights laws and most famously prohibition all came into effect during West's administration.

West established Oregon's beach highway law, proclaiming the entire Pacific coastline to the high tide line to be a public highway, thereby preserving scenery and beach access for future generations. The law protecting public access to the high-water line remains in effect on Oregon beaches, which were formally protected by the Oregon Legislature and Governor Tom McCall in 1967 (HB 1601).

West is also credited with establishing Oregon's highway system, when in 1913 the Oregon Highway Commission was created by the Oregon Legislative Assembly, levying a tax upon all property to fund the establishment of a state roadway system. The tax raised $700,000 during its first year, money which was targeted to the development of three major road routes — the Coast Highway (US-101), the Pacific Highway from Portland through the Willamette Valley, and the Columbia River Highway connecting Portland with Eastern Oregon.

He addressed a national convention of governors in New Jersey in 1911, on the topic of prison labor.

== Prohibition advocate ==
West was a fervent prohibitionist. He believed so strongly in the idea that he once declared martial law on New Year's Eve 1913 in order to shut down liquor-selling establishments in the town of Copperfield, Oregon. He then dispatched National Guard troops, chaperoned by his own personal secretary Fern Hobbs on January 2, 1914 to enforce the order and shut down the saloons.

== Sterilization and emasculation advocate ==
Known for his moral reforms, West pushed the 1913 Oregon legislature to adopt its first eugenics law in response to the Portland Vice Scandal of 1912 involving the arrest of gay men in Portland, Oregon. West called for sterilization and emasculation of the "degenerates who slink, in all their infamy, through every city, contaminating the young, debauching the innocent, cursing the State" and others who would come before the state's courts for similar sexual transgressions in the future.

== Reputation and legacy ==
Bend Mayor George P. Putnam criticized West in a New York Times interview shortly after the Copperfield affair. Putnam asserted that the Governor's theatrical methods, and his inordinate attention to the affairs of local communities, detracted from the governance and national image of the state as a whole.

Oregon writer Stewart Holbrook described West as "by all odds the most brilliant governor Oregon ever had."

West's time as governor is still felt in Oregon today because of his work to protect the state's natural resources. It was under his administration the beaches bordering the Pacific Ocean were protected for public use; the office of State Forester and the Bureau of Forestry were established; and the Fish Commission and Game Commission were created.

West served only one term, opting not to run for re-election in 1914. Instead, he moved his family to Portland where he practiced law. He was the Democratic party's nominee for the United States Senate in 1918, but lost to Charles L. McNary. After the run he largely limited his involvement in politics to spirited letters to the editor but was an influential adviser to Governor Charles H. Martin in the 1930s. He retired from his law practice after suffering a heart attack in 1945.

West died in Portland on August 22, 1960, and is buried in the Mount Crest Abbey Mausoleum in Salem, Oregon.

Oswald West State Park on the Oregon Coast is named in his honor, as is West Hall, a student residence hall on the campus of Oregon State University.

== See also ==
- List of United States governors born outside the United States

Party political offices
Preceded by George Earle Chamberlain	Democratic nominee for Governor of Oregon; 1910	Succeeded by C. J. Smith
Preceded by Harry Lane	Democratic nominee for U.S. Senator from Oregon (Class 2); 1918	Succeeded by Milton A. Miller
Political offices
Preceded by Jay Bowerman	Governor of Oregon; 1911–1915	Succeeded by James Withycombe
