= Hesper Township, Winneshiek County, Iowa =

Township in Winneshiek County, Iowa, U.S.

Coordinates: 43.465°N 91.791°W

Hesper Township is a township in Winneshiek County, Iowa, USA.

== History ==
Hesper Township was organized in 1858.

=== Notable people ===
Hamlin Garland, American Novelist, Essayist, Short Story Writer, Georgist, Psychical Researcher

Jay Bowerman, 13th Governor of Oregon

Lee Fullhart, wrestler at Decorah, Iowa High School and The University of Iowa, National Champion, 1997

Paul Korsness, state track champion, 1987, Class 1A 100-meter dash
