= George E. Chamberlain =

American politician and attorney (1854–1928)

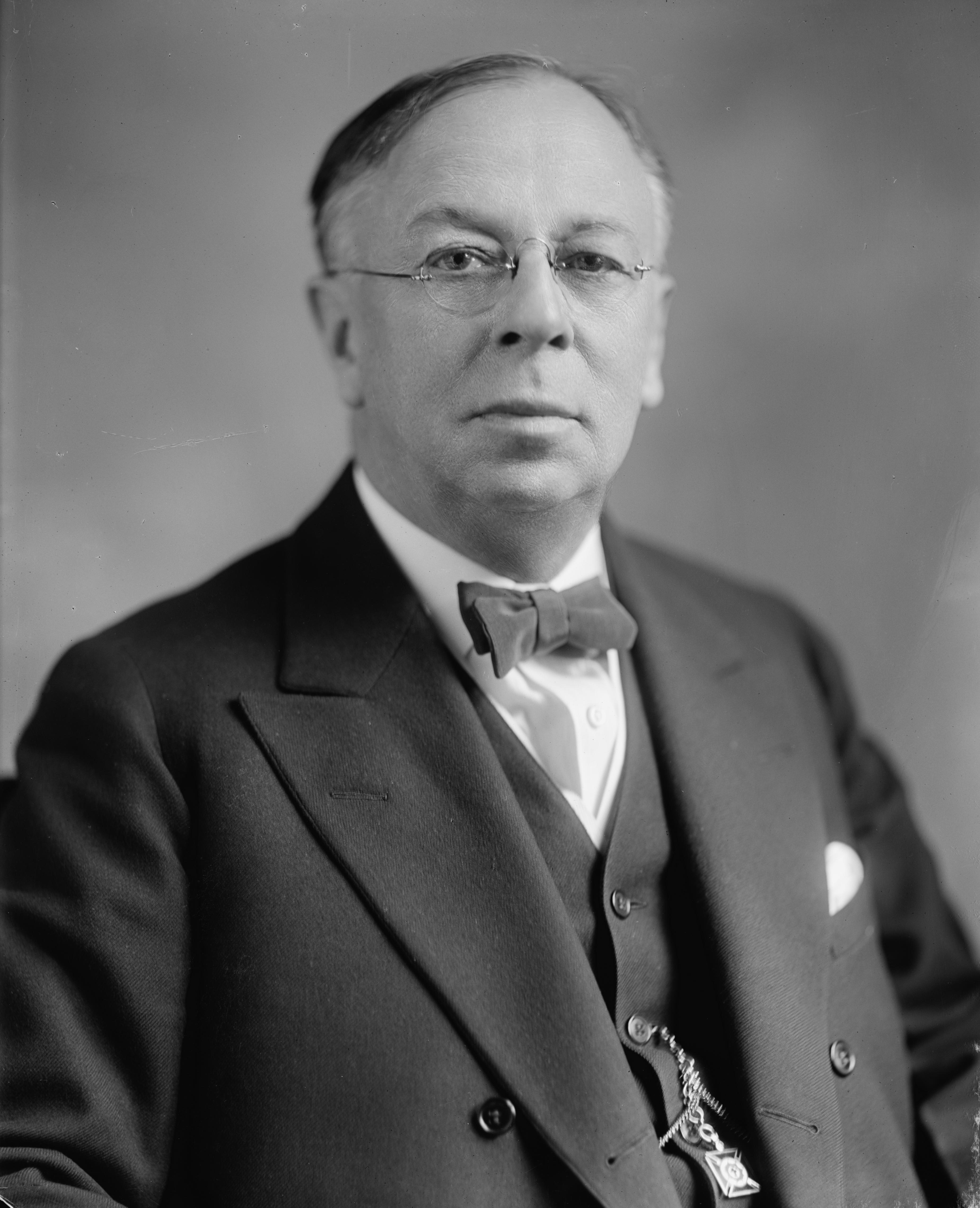
- Chamberlain, 1905–1928

United States Senator from Oregon
- In office March 4, 1909 – March 3, 1921
- Preceded by: Charles W. Fulton
- Succeeded by: Robert N. Stanfield

11th Governor of Oregon
- In office January 15, 1903 – February 28, 1909
- Preceded by: T. T. Geer
- Succeeded by: Frank W. Benson

1st Attorney General of Oregon
- In office May 20, 1891 – January 14, 1895
- Governor: Sylvester Pennoyer
- Preceded by: Inaugural holder
- Succeeded by: Cicero M. Idleman

Member of the Oregon House of Representatives
- In office 1880–1882

Personal details
- Born: George Earle Chamberlain; January 1, 1854 Natchez, Mississippi, U.S.
- Died: July 9, 1928 (aged 74) Washington, DC, U.S.
- Resting place: Arlington National Cemetery
- Party: Democratic
- Spouses: Sallie Newman Welch (m. 1879; died 1925) Carolyn B. Shelton (m. 1926)
- Profession: Lawyer
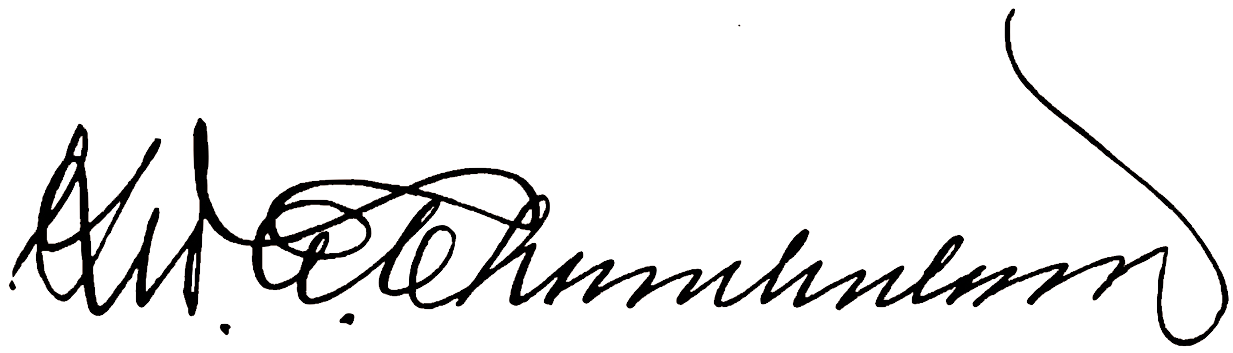
- Signature

George Earle Chamberlain Sr. (January 1, 1854 – July 9, 1928) was an American attorney, politician, and public official in Oregon. A native of Mississippi and member of the Democratic Party, Chamberlain's political achievements included appointment followed by election as the first attorney general of Oregon, a stint as the state's 11th governor, and two terms in the United States Senate in Washington, D.C.

== Biography ==
=== Early life ===
George Earle Chamberlain was born in Natchez, Mississippi, on January 1, 1854. The Chamberlain family were early immigrants to North America from England, helping to pioneer in the state of Massachusetts. His father, Dr. Charles Thomson Chamberlain, was born in Delaware and attended medical school in Philadelphia before moving to the small southern town of Natchez in 1837, attracted by the prospects offered there for a newly coined medical practitioner.

Dr. Charles Thomson Chamberlain established a successful practice in Natchez. He was married to Pamelia Archer, the daughter of Stevenson Archer Sr. and a sister of Stevenson Archer Jr., both of whom served in Congress from Maryland; she was also a granddaughter of Congressman John Archer. George Earle Chamberlain was Charles and Pamela's third child.

George Earle Chamberlain attended public schools in Natchez, completing his secondary education in 1870 at the age of 16. Following graduation he first worked two years as a clerk in a general merchandise store before leaving for Washington and Lee University in 1872. Chamberlain successfully complete the course of work there, graduating with dual degrees of Bachelor of Arts and Bachelor of Law in July 1876, gaining membership in Phi Kappa Psi fraternity in the process.

Following graduation from Washington and Lee, Chamberlain briefly returned home to Natchez but decided that professional prospects in the post-bellum South were marginal at best and he departed for a new life in Oregon, arriving on December 6, 1876.

Chamberlain's first job in the west was a brief and poor-paying stint as the teacher of a country school in Linn County, Oregon. Late in 1877 he was appointed deputy clerk of Linn County, remaining in that position until the summer of 1879. In the interim he passed the Oregon state bar, enabling him to practice law in the state. In 1879, Chamberlain married Sallie Newman Welch, with whom he would have seven children. He was widowed on May 26, 1925.

In 1878 he served in the Linn County Rifles, a volunteer militia formed to fight against belligerents from the Bannock, Shoshone, and Paiute peoples in the so-called Bannock War.

=== Political career ===
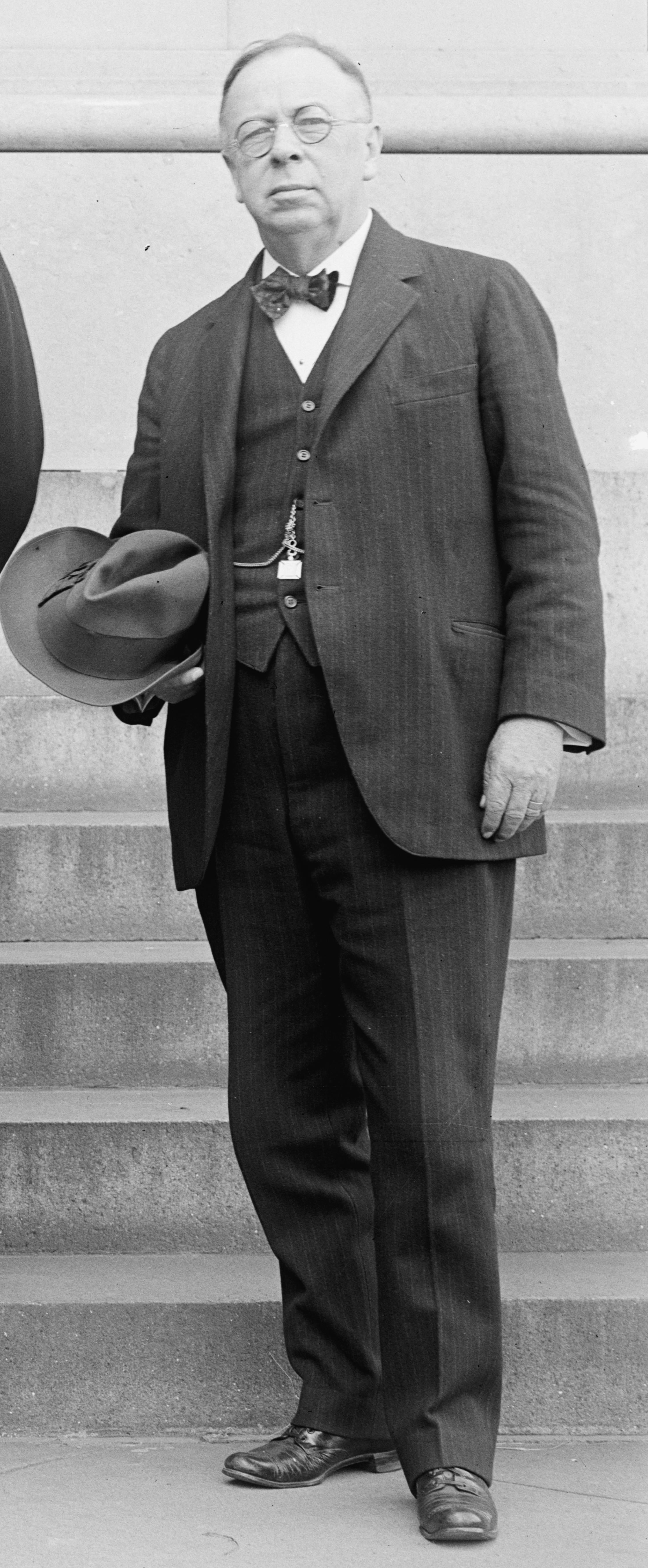
Senator George Earle Chamberlain, 1919

A member of the Democratic Party, Chamberlain ran for the Oregon House of Representatives in November 1880, winning election to a two-year term.

In 1884, Chamberlain was named district attorney for Oregon's 3rd judicial district. His skill in that position gained the notice of Democratic Governor Sylvester Pennoyer and when in 1891 the state legislature established the new position of Oregon Attorney General, Chamberlain was appointed in May as the first to serve that position. He stood for election to the position in the fall, winning at the polls despite being the candidate of the minority party in the state. Chamberlain would remain Oregon's Attorney General until January 1895, following the expiration of his term. He would be the only Democrat to serve that position for 58 years, until Robert Y. Thornton was elected in 1952.

After leaving the Oregon Attorney General's position, Chamberlain went into the banking business, taking positions with the First National Bank and later the Linn County National Bank in his new hometown of Albany.

Chamberlain next moved north to Portland and in 1900 stood for election as the district attorney for Multnomah County. He won by more than 1,000 votes, despite the county's 4,000 vote Republican majority. This again put Chamberlain in the public eye for a run at statewide office.

=== Governor of Oregon ===
In 1902, he was nominated by the Democratic Party of Oregon for Governor by acclamation at the party's nominating convention. Chamberlain was elected governor of Oregon in a tight election by just 256 votes, this in a state which delivered 15,000 more votes to the Republicans in the concurrent congressional elections.

Chamberlain was reelected in 1906, resigning his term when elected to the Senate.

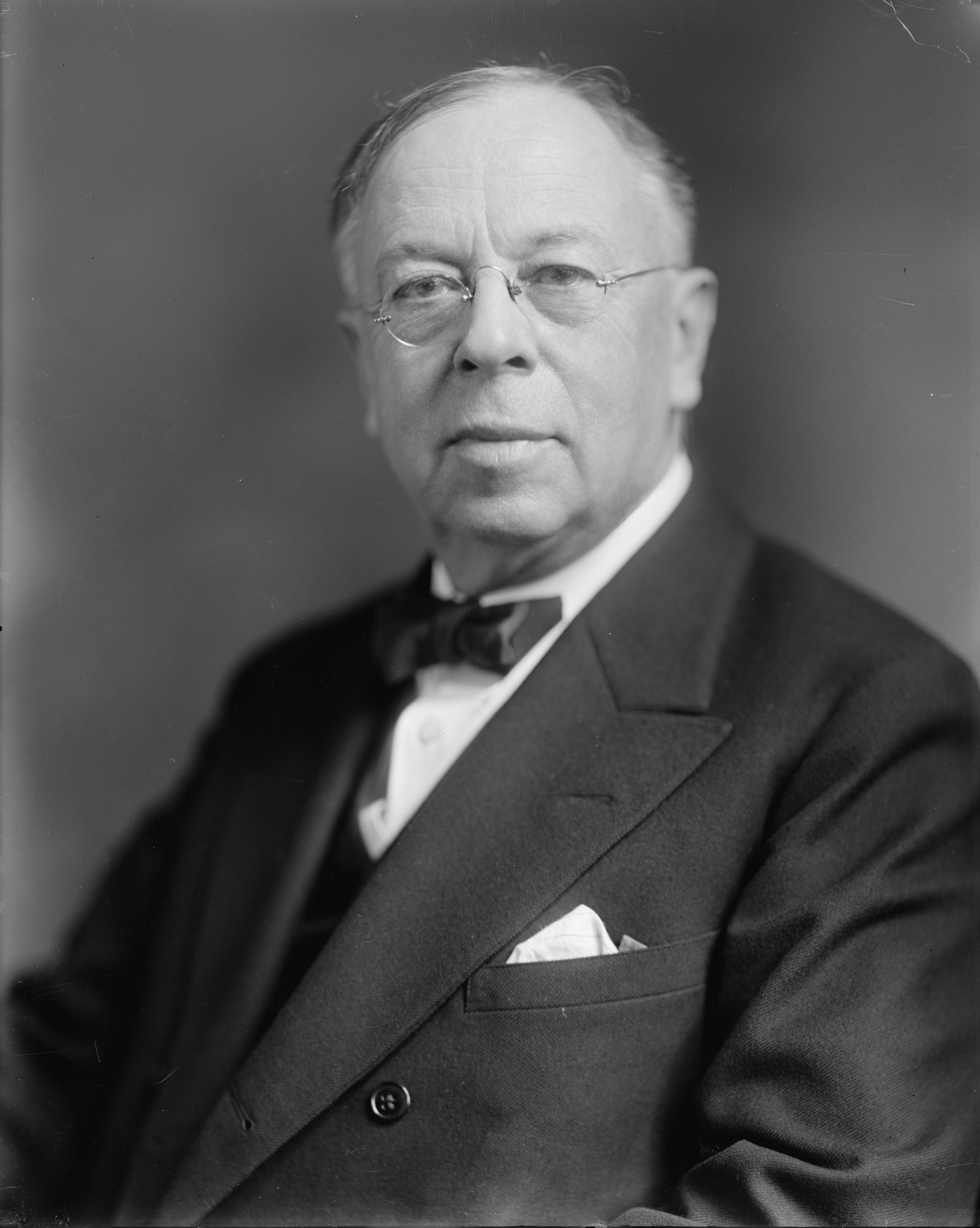
Chamberlain during his tenure in the 1920s

=== United States Senator ===
In 1908 he was elected as a Democrat to the U.S. Senate; he was reelected in 1914 and served from March 4, 1909, to March 3, 1921. He was an unsuccessful candidate for reelection in 1920. He was chairman of the Committee on Geological Survey (Sixty-second Congress) and a member of the Committee on Military Affairs (Sixty-third through Sixty-fifth Congresses), the Committee on Public Lands (Sixty-third Congress), and the Committee on Expenditures in the War Department (Sixty-sixth Congress).

The Chamberlain Military Preparedness Bill of 1918, which he wrote, bears his name.

=== Death and legacy ===
He was a member of the United States Shipping Board from 1921 to 1923 and engaged in the practice of law in Washington, D.C.

Chamberlain married his longtime personal secretary, Carolyn B. Shelton, on July 12, 1926, in Norfolk, Virginia.

Chamberlain died there on July 9, 1928, and interment was in Arlington National Cemetery.

During his life Chamberlain was a member of the Independent Order of Odd Fellows, Knights of Pythias, and was a 32nd degree Mason in Portland. He was also a member of the Commercial Club of Portland, the Multnomah Athletic Club, the Oregon Historical Society, and was a life member of the Benevolent and Protective Order of Elks.

== See also ==
- George Earle Chamberlain House
- National Irrigation Congress

== Footnotes ==
Party political offices
Preceded by W. R. King	Democratic nominee for Governor of Oregon; 1902, 1906	Succeeded by Oswald West
First	Democratic nominee for U.S. Senator from Oregon (Class 3); 1914, 1920	Succeeded by Bert E. Haney
Legal offices
Preceded by Office established	Attorney General of Oregon; 1891–1895	Succeeded by Cicero M. Idleman
Political offices
Preceded by T. T. Geer	Governor of Oregon; 1903–1909	Succeeded by Frank W. Benson
U.S. Senate
Preceded by Charles W. Fulton	U.S. Senator (Class 3) from Oregon; 1909–1921	Succeeded by Robert N. Stanfield
