= Joseph Showalter Smith =

American politician

Joseph S. Smith
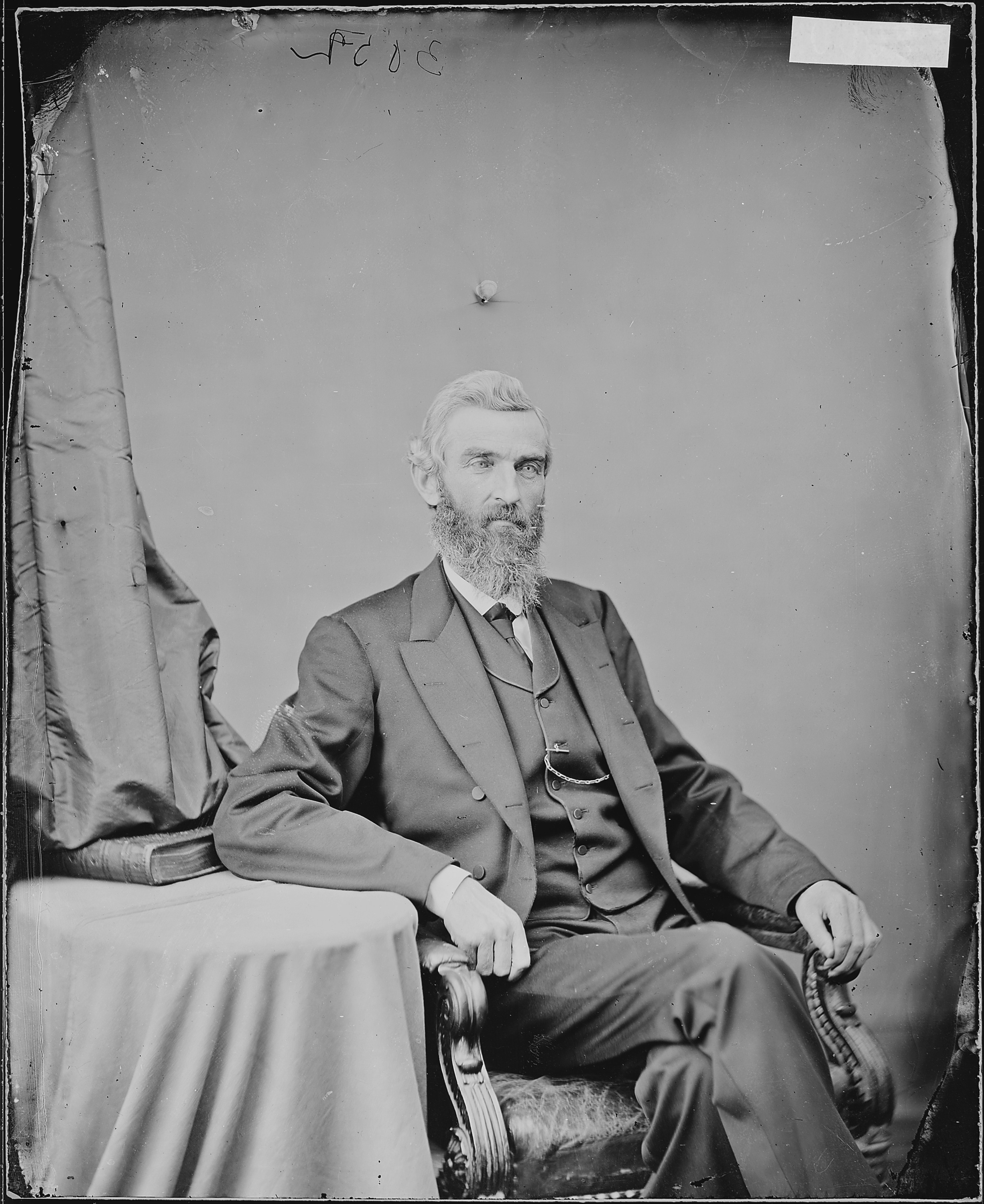

Member of the U.S. House of Representatives from Oregon's At-large district
- In office March 4, 1869 – March 3, 1871
- Preceded by: Rufus Mallory
- Succeeded by: James H. Slater

Personal details
- Born: June 20, 1824 Connellsville, Pennsylvania, US
- Died: September 28, 1884 (aged 60) Portland, Oregon, US
- Party: Democratic
- Spouse: Julia A. Carter

Joseph Showalter Smith (June 20, 1824 – September 28, 1884) was an American lawyer and politician who served one term as a Representative from the U.S. state of Oregon from 1869 to 1871.

== Early life ==
Born in Connellsville, Pennsylvania, Smith moved with his farmer parents to Ohio and Indiana, where he attended the common schools. In 1844, at the age of 20, he was one of the early traveler on the Oregon Trail to Oregon, arriving in the spring of 1845 and settling in Salem, where he taught school, studied law, and was admitted to the bar.

== Political career ==
In 1851, he sought election as Portland's first mayor, but lost by four votes to Hugh O'Bryant. In 1853, he moved to Olympia, Washington, and was elected to the Washington territorial house of representatives in 1856 and served as speaker. He was appointed United States attorney for Washington Territory by President James Buchanan March 12, 1857.

Smith returned to Salem in 1858 and practiced law for twelve years. In 1862, he was selected by the Democratic convention to be their candidate for Associate Justice of the Oregon Supreme Court, but he declined the nomination. In 1866, he was the Democratic candidate for United States Senate, but lost to Republican Henry W. Corbett by three votes in the Legislature.

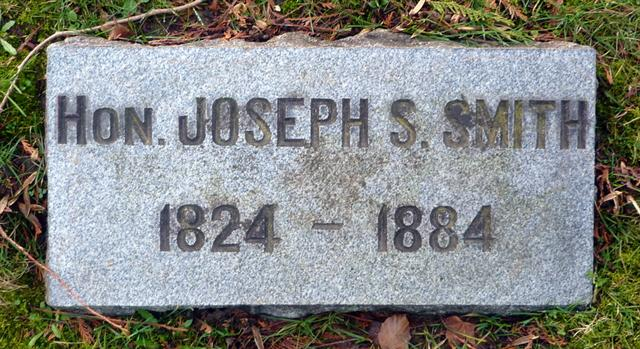

In 1868, Smith was elected as a Democrat to the United States House of Representatives and served one term from March 4, 1869 – March 4, 1871. After his term was completed, he moved to Portland, Oregon and resumed his law practice. He ran for Governor of Oregon in 1882, but lost to Republican Zenas Ferry Moody.

He died in Portland on September 28, 1884 and was interred in Portland's River View Cemetery.

Party political offices
Preceded by W. W. Thayer	Democratic nominee for Governor of Oregon; 1882	Succeeded by Sylvester Pennoyer
U.S. House of Representatives
Preceded by Rufus Mallory	Member of the U.S. House of Representatives from Oregon's at-large congressional district March 4, 1869 – March 3, 1871	Succeeded by James H. Slater
