= John Gates (disambiguation) =

John Gates (1913–1992) was an American Communist Party activist.

John Gates may also refer to:

- John Gates (courtier) (1504–1553), English courtier, soldier and politician
- John Gates (Portland mayor) (1827–1888), mayor of Portland, Oregon
- John W. Gates (New York politician) (1872–1966), New York politician
- John Warne Gates (1855–1911), promoter of barbed wire
