= Portland City Hall (Oregon) =

Historic building in Portland, Oregon, U.S.

- U.S. National Register of Historic Places
- Portland Historic Landmark
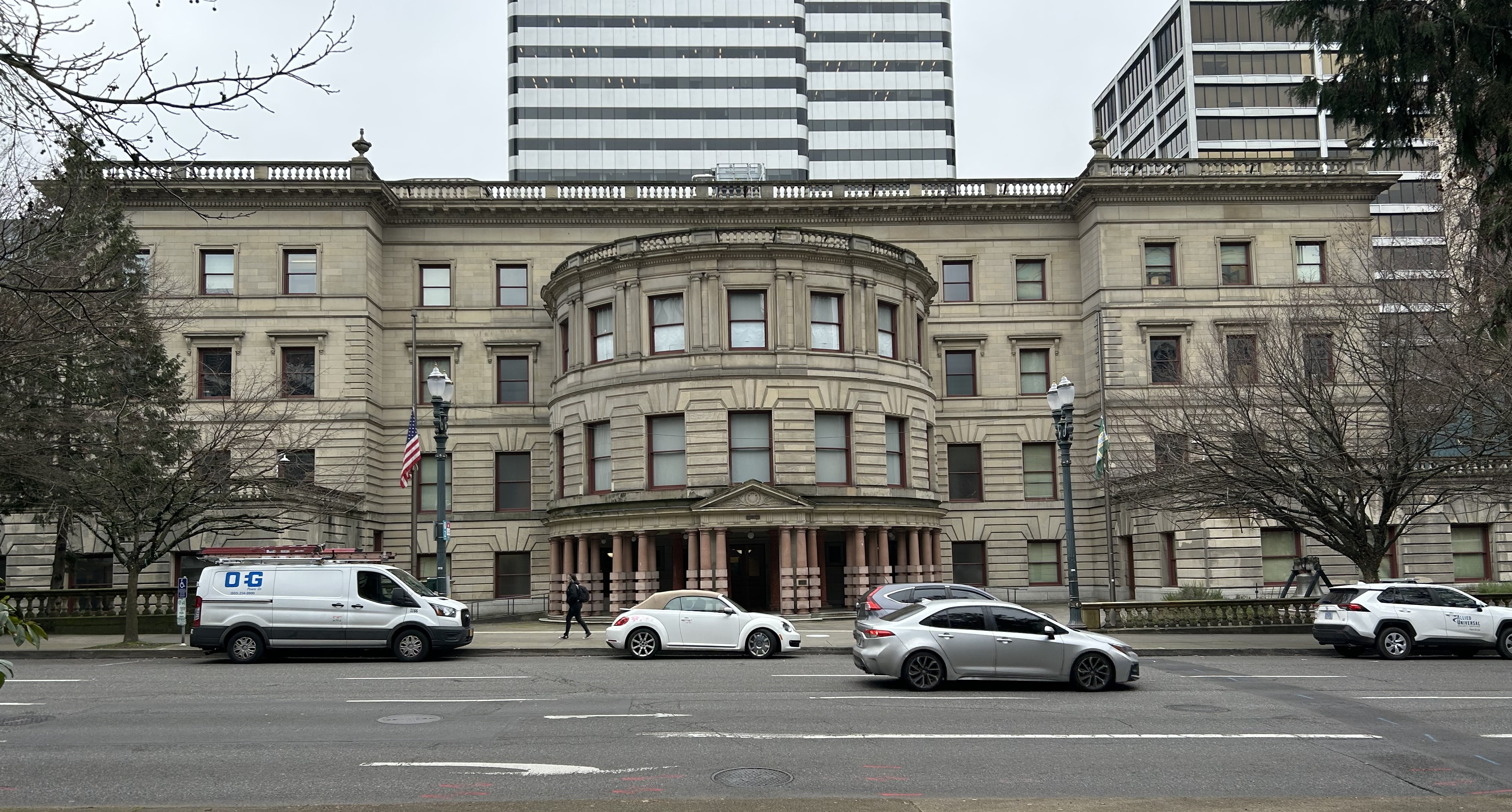

- Location within Portland, Oregon Location within Oregon Location within the United States
- Location: 1221 SW 4th Avenue; Portland, Oregon
- Coordinates: 45°30′54″N 122°40′45″W
- Built: 1895; 131 years ago
- Architect: Whidden & Lewis
- Architectural style: Italianate; Renaissance
- NRHP reference No.: 74001711
- Added to NRHP: November 21, 1974

Portland City Hall is the headquarters of city government of Portland, Oregon, United States. The four-story Italian Renaissance-style building houses the offices of the City Council, which consists of the mayor and twelve councilors, and several other offices. City Hall is also home to the City Council chambers, located in the rotunda on the east side of the structure. Completed in 1895, the building was added to the National Register of Historic Places on November 21, 1974. City Hall has gone through several renovations, with the most recent overhaul gutting the interior to upgrade it to modern seismic and safety standards. The original was built for $600,000, while the 1996 to 1998 renovation cost $29 million.

Located in downtown Portland, City Hall sits on an entire city block along Fourth and Fifth avenues at Madison and Jefferson Streets. To the south is the Wells Fargo Center, and to the north is the Portland Building. Terry Schrunk Plaza (named for a former mayor) is across Fourth Avenue to the east. In addition to more than 87,000 square feet (8,100 m^{2}) of interior space, the exterior consists of landscaped grounds. The main entrance is located on Fourth Avenue, though for a time it was located on the Fifth Avenue side.

== History ==
=== Late 19th century ===
The 1895-to-present City Hall replaced an earlier building at Second and Ash streets. In 1869, the Oregon Episcopal School was founded in downtown Portland, with the women-only St. Helens Hall on the current block of City Hall.

The city hired Henry J. Hefty to design the building; his design was "a huge ostentatious structure that appeared to be modeled on the Kremlin." The city purchased the block in 1890 for $100,000, and construction began in 1892, but was halted due to dissatisfaction with the design. After the foundation and basement of the building had been built, the new City Hall Commission canceled the contract and tore out the basement and first floor at an expense of $125,000.

This board terminated Hefty and hired the architectural firm of Whidden and Lewis to design a new building. Ion Lewis and William Whidden were originally from Boston, but were in Portland for the Portland Hotel project, and Whidden had been employed with McKim, Mead, and White. The board also persuaded the state legislature to authorize an additional $500,000 in bonds to complete the project. Whidden & Lewis designed a four-story structure in a neo-Renaissance style that included a clock tower. Designed to be located in the center portion of the building, the tower was to rise five-stories above the rest of City Hall with a total height of 200 feet. Due to costs, the clock tower was never built. A domed cupola also designed by Whidden and Lewis was never built. The original building design was praised for the details and symmetry.

In 1893, construction at the site was restarted. The contractors were Rocheford, Gould and Gladden from Omaha, Nebraska. City Hall was built with un-reinforced masonry walls and slurry concrete floors to save on costs.

Construction on the new structure was finished in 1895, and the city offices were moved into the building in late January 1895. The first city council meeting held in the new building took place on February 6. Once completed, the building was one of the first large buildings in the Pacific Northwest to have electric wiring, have centralized heating, include public elevators, or be considered fireproof. William S. Mason was the first Portland mayor in the new City Hall, with a total of 34 people working in the building at opening. His successor, Sylvester Pennoyer, called the new building "expensive, unseemly and unhealthful".

Funding for the city hall came from several sources. In 1889, the Oregon Legislative Assembly approved a sale of $175,000 worth of bonds by the City of Portland to finance the construction of a new city hall. The building ultimately cost $575,000.

When built, the surrounding area was composed of dirt roads and private residences. The Southern Pacific Railroad's 1868 west side rail line ran down Fourth Avenue past City Hall and the county courthouse. The city and county governments fought the railroad to remove the dirty and noisy steam locomotives from this route, succeeding in 1912. Southern Pacific's electric interurban line continued on the tracks until the 1930s. In 2007, work began on adding light rail tracks on Fifth Avenue for the planned MAX Green Line, and trains once again ran past City Hall starting in 2009.

=== 20th century ===
In 1902, two Port Orford cedar trees were planted on the east side of City Hall. One tree was planted on the north side and the second tree on the south side of the building to reinforce the symmetrical aspects of the building. The south tree was replaced in 1999 due to poor health. In 1910, the city added passenger elevators to the open stairwells.

Until 1902 the Portland Public Library, which started as a reading room for sailors and then as a subscription library, was housed in the building. In 1928, the city began one of a series of renovations on the building to increase floor space. That year one of the two light wells were filled in, blocking off natural light to the lower floors. The city added a new elevator in 1931. The next remodel started in 1933, and lasted through 1937. During this construction the second light well was filled in for more space, and a penthouse apartment was built on top of the roof.

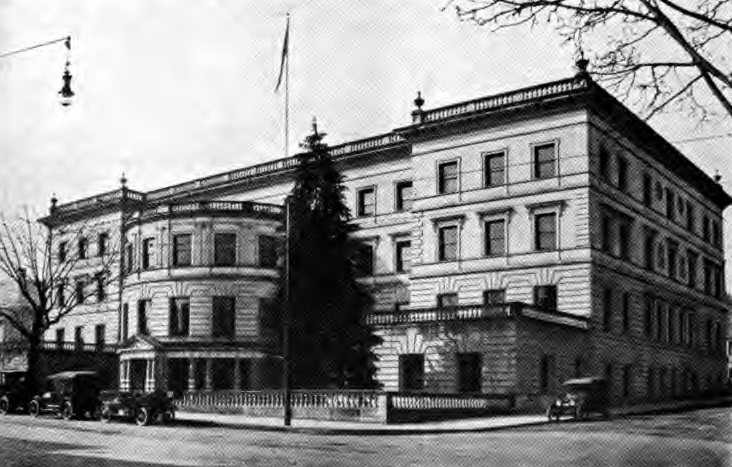
City Hall circa 1922

In 1910, the city installed a large boulder on the southeast portion of the grounds. The Oregon Railway and Navigation Company had found the 15,000-year-old boulder in 1897 and moved it to Portland. The ten ton Wallula Stone was discovered in the Columbia River Gorge, and was covered with petroglyphs. It was returned to the Umatilla tribe of Native Americans in Eastern Oregon in 1996. The old elevators inside were replaced again in 1946, and in 1948 a runaway truck destroyed part of the stone railing on the Fifth Avenue side, which was then fixed.

In the 1960s the mayor's office was refurbished, a new roof was installed, and new trees were planted on the grounds. In 1964, the city remodeled the City Council chambers on the second and third floors. Part of the work was to install new lighting to allow television broadcasts from the chamber, while other work added drop tiles to the ceiling, hiding the domed roof.

In the early morning hours of November 21, 1970, a dynamite-fueled bomb exploded underneath the portico, doing $170,000 in damage. Though no one was injured, windows were blown out, the Council Chamber (located above the blast) was damaged, all of the columns of the portico were damaged and replaced, and the Liberty Bell replica was a complete loss. A new bell was purchased for $8,000 and later moved to Terry Schrunk Plaza. No one was ever arrested or claimed responsibility for the bombing.

Later in the decade, Portland upgraded City Hall by adding fire sprinklers and smoke detectors. In 1973, the sandstone exterior was cleaned and sealed to prevent moisture from eroding the fragile stone. It was later learned that this process was harmful as the silicon coating sealed the moisture inside the rock. In 1974, City Hall was added to the National Register of Historic Places. The following year the rooftop penthouse was converted into an employee break room that included an outdoor deck. In 1978, the city constructed a wheelchair ramp to provide access to the handicapped.

The 1980s saw additional renovations. The auditor's office and the mayor's office were both renovated, though work on the mayor's office halted when funds were exhausted. The city expanded the office of the city's attorney, and in 1982 the Portland Building was finished across the street. This allowed the city to move many city offices into a single location. Work was also completed on the exterior, while a new roof was finished. In 1985, the building began a conversion from steam heating.

In January 1995, the City Council voted to remove parking from the grounds of City Hall. Previously, the landscaped yard surrounding the building had been paved to allow the city council members to park their vehicles on site. That month also marked the 100th birthday of the structure.

=== Renovation ===
Discussions about the need to upgrade and renovate City Hall began anew in 1988. In 1994, proposals were made to remodel and update the structure to meet modern building codes, with an estimated cost of $16 million. Work was to include replacing the concrete floors, structural upgrades, and restoring the original light corridors that penetrated all four floors of the building. In March 1995, plans were made to renovate the then-100-year-old structure. The estimated $22-million project was proposed due to the building failing to comply with the city codes for earthquakes and fires.

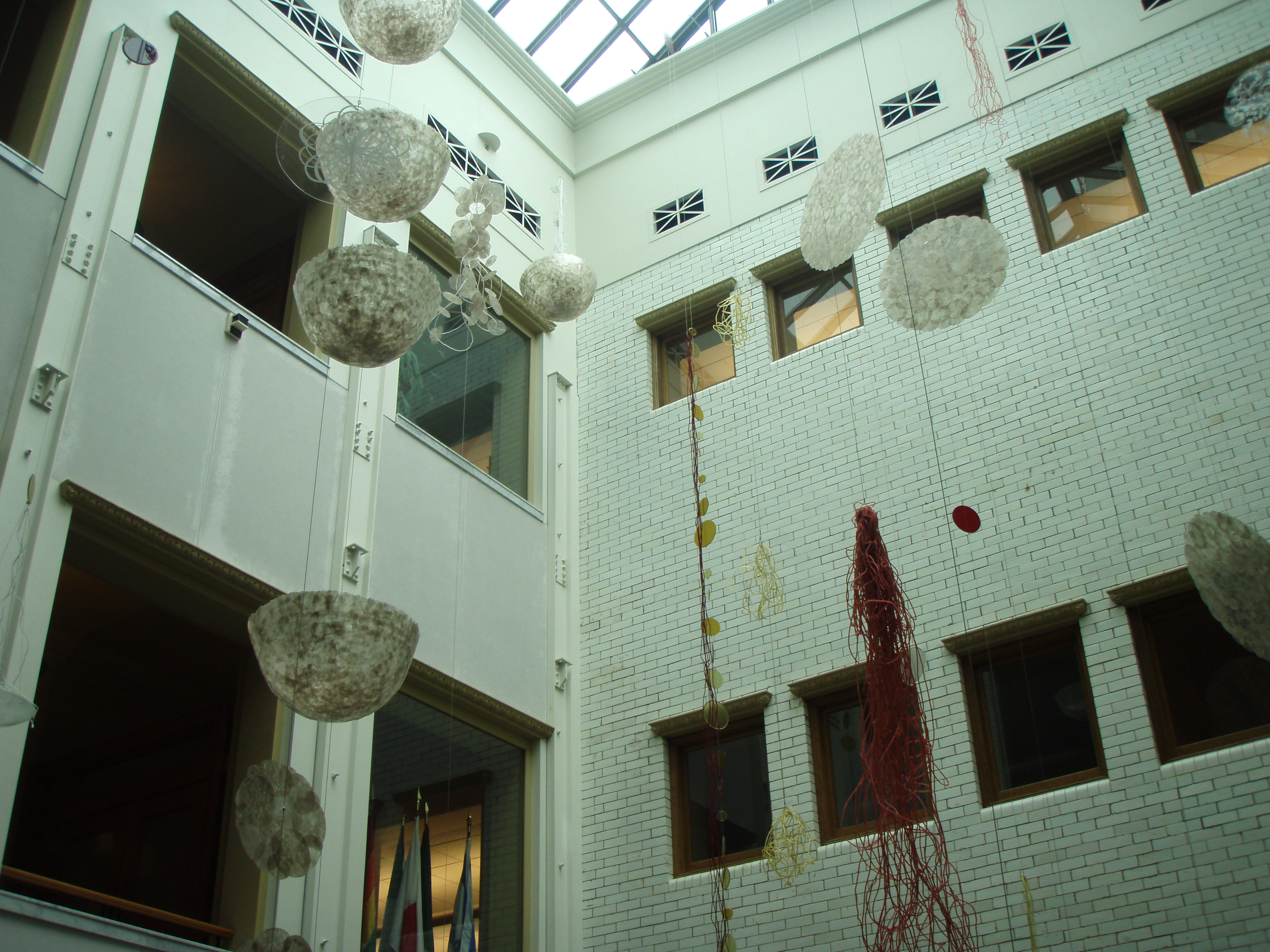
Northern light well, with hanging art exhibit, 2008

Some preparatory work for the renovation began in November 1995. On May 3, 1996, City Hall closed and offices relocated for the renovation project. The offices were temporarily housed in the former State Office Building (now Fifth Avenue Building) nearby on Fifth Avenue. Bing Sheldon served as the architect on the remodel. Drake Construction served as the contractor for the project with SERA Architects as the design firm.

On June 17, 1996, a 120-foot (37 m)-long boom portion of a construction crane crashed at the construction site, scraping the stone on the east side of the building, but not injuring anyone. Due to the fragile sandstone exterior, the damage on the rotunda was not repaired. In January 1997, construction crews finished the demolition portion of the project and finished the structural reinforcement part before they began the interior construction phase.

Designers restored the light corridors inside the building during the remodel. These two central light courts allowed more natural lighting into the interior of the building. Additionally, the old Fourth Avenue entrance was restored, and the address was changed to 1221 S.W. Fourth Avenue. Renovations also restored the original look of the City Council chamber, with council members now facing the windows.

The original red and white marble from the floors was saved and reinstalled on top of the new concrete slab flooring. New marble was used on the fourth floor. Other changes included the addition of central air conditioning, insulation of the roof and exterior walls, and the replacement of the old single-pane windows. Public restrooms were added on the east side on each floor. During construction, the usable floor space in the building was reduced from 50,370 square feet (4,680 m^{2}) to 48,128 square feet (4,471.2 m^{2}). Restoration of the interior included work on the wrought-iron frame of the stairwell, uncovering the copper plating that decorated the walls in the stairwell, and work on the wrought-iron frame of the elevator shafts. Additionally, nearly 40% of the building's structural steel was replaced, the plumbing was replaced, HVAC systems were added, concrete slabs replaced the concrete slurry floors, new electrical systems were installed, shear concrete walls were added, as were new security, fire, and life safety systems.

On March 30, 1998, City Hall reopened to the public. There were concerns over the cost of the project that increased from around $15 million to a final cost of nearly $30 million. The city had approved $28.1 million before the project started. Of the $29.3 million final cost of the project, construction costs totaled $19.9 million. Of that amount, $17 million was to bring the building up to modern fire and safety standards. Additional funds were spent on artwork, a temporary location for offices, and new furniture among other costs. Reasons given for the additional costs varied from new problems uncovered during the remodel, a booming construction market at the time, and delays in starting the project.

Financing of the renovations came from local bonds, with approximately $3 million per year coming from the general fund to pay the debt off. Prior attempts at raising private funds for the project had failed. The project was named as the top public project and was an honorable mention in the renovation category for 1998 by Northwest Construction magazine.

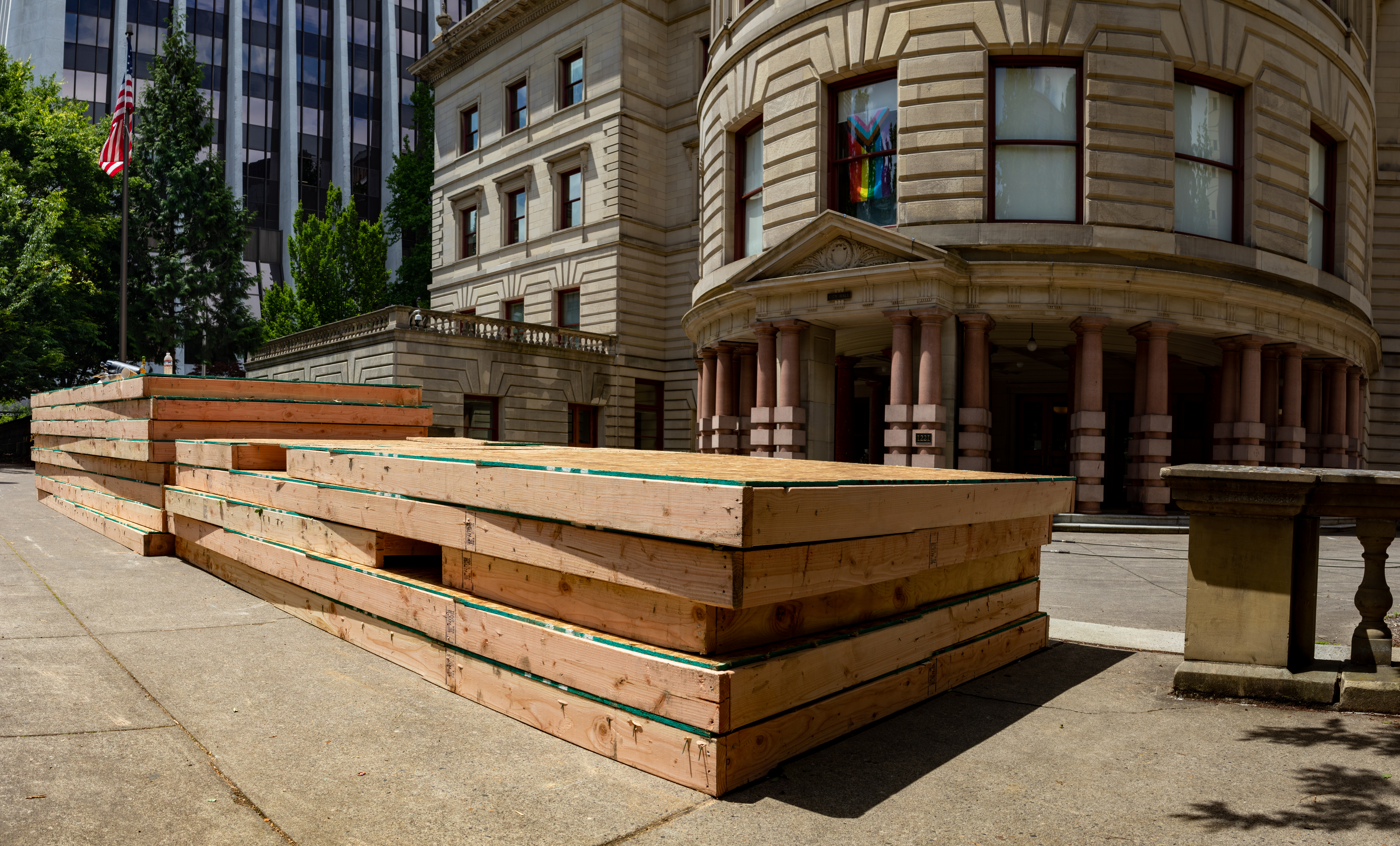
Main entrance to City Hall with temporary (24-hour) walls, erected during the George Floyd protests in Portland, Oregon, June 2020.

== Details ==
The four-story building is in the Italian Renaissance style of architecture with a sandstone exterior. The interior of City Hall covers 87,500 square feet (8,130 m^{2}), with 48,128 square feet (4,471.2 m^{2}) of usable space. Measured along Fifth Avenue, it is 180 feet (55 m) wide. Viewed from above the building is similar in shape to the letter E, with the rotunda as the middle protruding portion of the building. There are two wings that extend toward Fourth Avenue, one on the far north and the other on the far south, each only a single story in height where it is closest to Fourth. The rotunda is three stories high, with the portico comprising the first floor. Granite columns imported from Scotland are used to support the portico. Portland City Council chambers occupy the two other floors inside of the rotunda, on the east side of the building.

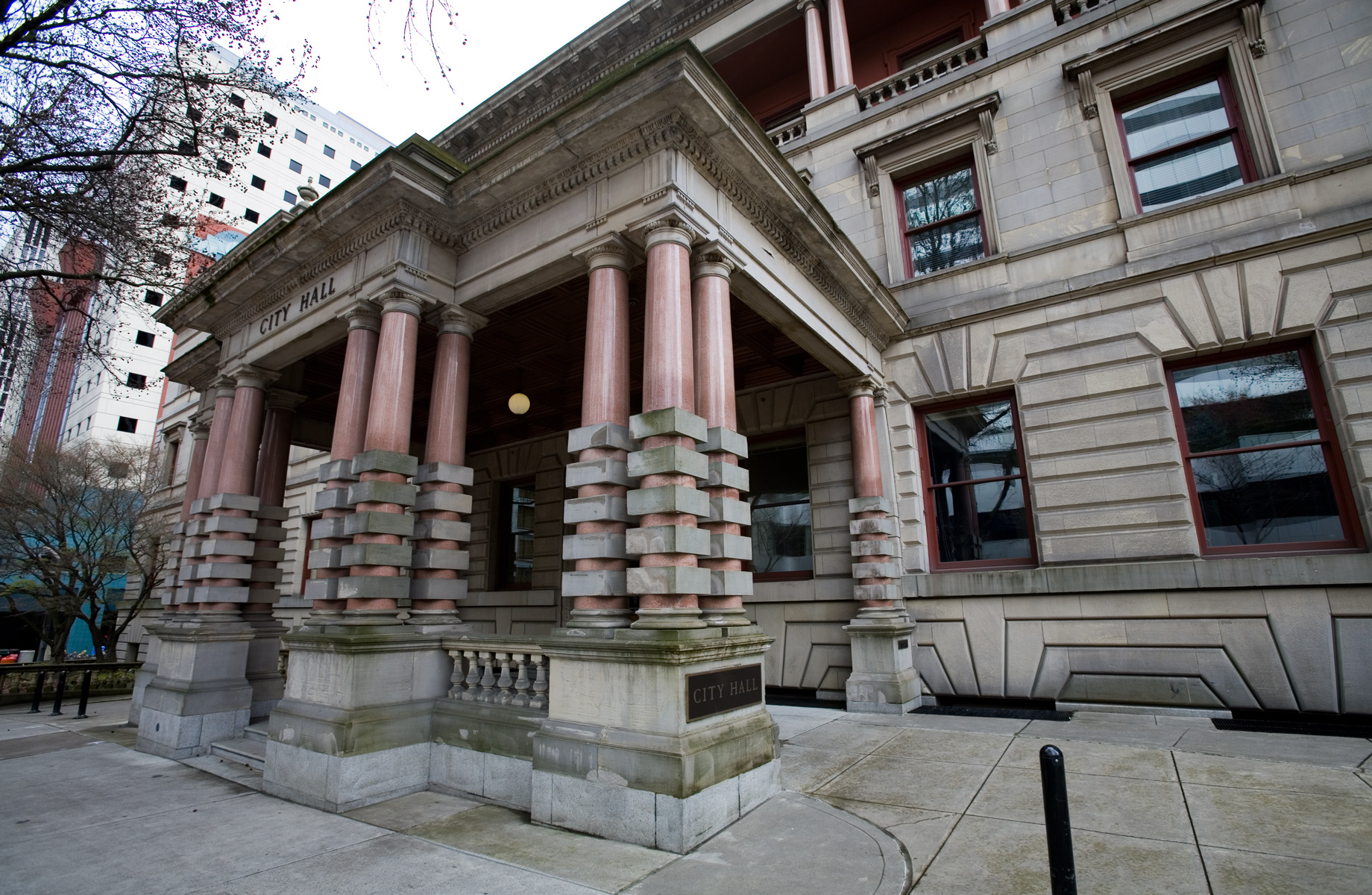
Fifth Avenue entrance

On the roof of City Hall are 4-foot-tall (1.2 m) ornamental urns, originally made of limestone. During the last remodel they were replaced using lightweight material for pedestrian safety. The building features dentil molding where the roof meets the walls, and the fourth floor has a balcony with paired Tuscan columns on the west side. Additionally, the exterior features keystones over the windows on the first and second floors, plus a balustrade along the roof line. Inside the High Renaissance building, the columns of the lobby are covered with a fake marble coating called Scagliola. The lobby has marble flooring and oak woodwork. In the atrium the walls are covered in a white tile that was re-discovered during the 1996 remodel.

The Pettygrove Room on the second floor is named for Francis W. Pettygrove, the Portland founder who won the coin toss to name the city. The main stairway at City Hall has 77 steps, with iron handrails and tile steps. The building sits 70 feet (21 m) above sea level. Artwork in the building includes works by Norie Sato, a mural by Michael Brophy in the Council Chamber, a constantly changing work called the "Visual Chronicle of Portland" located on the main floor, and changing exhibits.

The Governmental Relations office and the office of the city's attorney are on the fourth floor. On the third floor are the mayor's office, the ceremonial Rose Room, a balcony for the Council chambers, Audit Services, and the city's affirmative action office. The second floor contains the city council chambers, two conference rooms, and four commissioners' offices. On the main floor is the lobby, the Office of Neighborhood Involvement, an information desk, and offices for the city auditor, council clerk, and city treasurer. The grounds of the building include a rose garden, trees, a vegetable garden, and other landscaping.
