= Carrie B. Wilson Adams =

Carrie Belle (Wilson) Adams
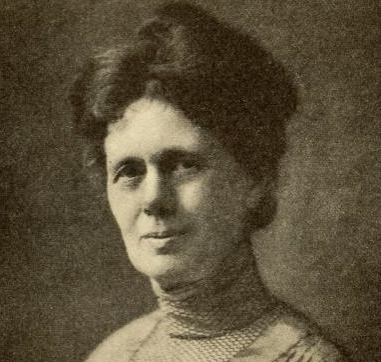
- Born: Carrie Belle Wilson; June 29, 1859; Oxford, Ohio
- Died: December 15, 1940 (aged 81); Portland, Oregon
- Occupations: Choral conductor and composer; pianist
- Notable work: First American woman to conduct Handel's "Messiah" (1896) and one of the most prolific American composers
- Spouse: Allyn G. Adams (m. 1880–1936; his death)
- Children: Stanley Adams
- Parents: David Wilson; Allie (Myers) Wilson

Carrie Belle (Wilson) Adams (1859–1940) was the first American woman to conduct a public performance of Handel's oratorio, "Messiah." An Ohio native and musical child prodigy who performed in concert for the first time at age seven, she spent much of her life in Indiana, where she was a choral conductor and organist. By the time of her death in Portland, Oregon, she had also become one of the most prolific American composers, completing 4,000 anthems, 12 cantatas, and 28 operettas during her lifetime.

== Formative years ==
Born in Oxford, Ohio on July 28, 1858 (alternate birth date June 29, 1859), Carrie Belle Wilson was the oldest child of Allie (Myers) Wilson and David Wilson, a songwriter and music educator. Her mother was also a musician.

As the American Civil War was waged across a major portion of the United States during the early 1860s, Carrie Wilson was studying music with her father. By the time the war was over, she had made her debut. A child prodigy, she sang for a convention of musicians in Millville, Ohio, when she was just seven years old. According to biographer Jacob Henry Hull, she was also "a brilliant pianist and accompanist from her girlhood days."

In 1872, she and her parents and five siblings moved to Paris, Illinois, where her father founded the Paris Musical Institute. Three years later, at the age of 16, she published an anthem – the first of many compositions she would pen over the years. By 1876, she was serving as the organist and choir director for the Paris Presbyterian Church.

== Family life and professional music career ==
On July 21, 1880, Carrie Belle Wilson married amateur playwright Allyn G. Adams. She then relocated with her husband to Terre Haute, Indiana in 1882. Their son, Stanley, was born on October 18, 1887.

From 1887 to 1896, she was employed as a professor of music at the Indiana State Normal School (now Indiana State University), and also chaired the music department there. In addition, she served as conductor of The Choral, Rose Polytechnic Glee and Treble Clef clubs and The Terre Haute Oratorio Society. In 1893, she published her musical play, "The National Flower." By the time of her retirement from the university three years later, she had completed work on 12 cantatas, 4,000 anthems, and 28 operettas.

Following her husband's retirement, she relocated with him in 1920 to Portland, Oregon to be closer to her son, Stanley. After 16 years together in Portland, her husband widowed her in 1936. In addition to playing the pipe organ for the First Congregational Church (Portland, Oregon), she became an associate editor with The Choir Herald, and continued to compose music into her early 80s. According to a 1936 article in Time magazine, "In Portland, Ore. last week Mrs. Adams sent off to her publishers four new anthems, baked a jelly cake, [and] celebrated her 77th birthday." Among the works completed in later life was the cantata, "The Easter Triumph." Completed in 1940, it was published posthumously.

== Illness, death and interment ==
Suffering from a heart condition, Carrie Belle (Wilson) Adams was admitted to a private hospital in Portland, Oregon, for treatment sometime in late November or early December 1940. She remained there for several weeks until her death on December 15, 1940 at the age of 81.

According to a statement made to The Oregonian by a representative of her longtime publisher, Lorenz Publishing Co., "Adams' compositions [were being performed] each Sunday by an average of 300,000 choir singers" at the time of her death. Dr. Raymond B. Walker, the pastor of Portland's First Congregational Church officiated at her funeral services, which were held at J. P. Finley & Son on December 18, 1940.

She was survived by her brother, Charles E. Wilson, and sister, Merle Wilson, who were both residing in Portland, as well as a daughter-in-law, nieces, nephews, and grandchildren. Her son, Stanley, had preceded her in death six months earlier.

== Titles of works created ==
1890s:

- "The National Flower" (cantata in three acts). Cincinnati, Ohio: The John Church Co., 1893.
- "We Are Soldiers," in The Gospel Hymnal for Sunday school and church work. Cincinnati, Ohio: Jennings & Pye, 1899.

1900s:

- "Easter Praise" (cantata). New York, New York: Lorenz Publishing Co., 1908.
- "Jesus, Thou Source of Calm Repose." Dayton, Ohio: Lorenz Publishing Co., 1906.
- "How Beautiful Jesus' Love!" in International Praise: for the Sunday school and church. Chicago, Illinois: E. O. Excell, 1902.
- "Redeemer and King" (cantata). New York, New York: Lorenz Publishing Co., 1909.
- "Remember now Thy Creator." Dayton, Ohio: Lorenz Publishing Co., 1904.
- "Send Out Thy Light," in United Praise: for use in Sunday Schools, Young People's Societies and other Church Services. New York, New York: Lorenz & Co., 1908.
- "Soldiers on life's highway," in Praises. Chicago, Illinois: E. O. Excell, 1905.
- "Sunday School Cadets," in International Praise: for the Sunday school and church. Chicago, Illinois: E. O. Excell, 1902. (Note: This hymn was also published in subsequent years in different hymnals under the title, "Honor-Bright Cadets.")
- "The Heavens declare." Cincinnati, Ohio: Fillmore Music House, 1906.
- "There's a song in the air." Cincinnati, Ohio: Fillmore Bros. Co., September 28, 1906.
- "The Sunshine of God," in Hymns that Help: in Sunday schools, young people's societies and other church services. Dayton, Ohio: Lorenz Publishing Co., 1903.

1910s:

- "A Song of Cheer," in The King's Message: a collection of sunday school songs. New York, New York: Lorenz Publishing Co., 1910.
- "A Tale of a Hat." Dayton, Ohio: Lorenz Publishing Co., 1913.
- "Blessings Every Day," in Praise Ye, a Collection of Sacred Songs. New York, New York: Lorenz Publishing Co., 1913.
- "Brighter Than the Sunshine," in The King's Message: a collection of sunday school songs. New York, New York: Lorenz Publishing Co., 1910.
- "The Harbor of Home: a Mother's Day exercise." Dayton, Ohio: Lorenz Publishing Co., 1915.
- "Hail, King of Kings," in The Junior Choir No. 2. New York, New York: Lorenz Publishing Co., 1910.
- "Just as I am." Dayton, Ohio: Lorenz Publishing Co., 1914.
- "Marching Along," in The King's Message: a collection of sunday school songs. New York, New York: Lorenz Publishing Co., 1910.
- "Our loving Lord was crucified," in Praise Ye, a Collection of Sacred Songs. New York, New York: Lorenz Publishing Co., 1913.
- "Praise and prayer: a collection of new anthems." Dayton, Ohio: Lorenz Publishing Co., 1914.
- "Rallying Song," in The King's Message: a collection of sunday school songs. New York, New York: Lorenz Publishing Co., 1910.
- Songs new and old for men's voices, Songs new and old for mixed voices, and Songs new and old for women's voices (1914). Dayton, Ohio: Lorenz Publishing Co., 1914.
- "Steadily marching onward," in The King's Message: a collection of sunday school songs. New York, New York: Lorenz Publishing Co., 1910.
- "The Savior's Love," in The King's Message: a collection of sunday school songs. New York, New York: Lorenz Publishing Co., 1910.
- "'Tis Jesus, the Friend of the world," in Praise Ye, a Collection of Sacred Songs. New York, New York: Lorenz Publishing Co., 1913.
- "Under the Stars and Stripes" (operetta, 1917).
- "Young men's chorus, a collection of sacred songs, quartets and anthems for men's voices." Dayton, Ohio: Lorenz Publishing Co., 1912.

1920s:

- "Cheerful givers," in Children's Praise and Worship. Anderson, Indiana: Gospel Trumpet Publishing Co., 1928.
- "Children O'er the Seas," in Glad Songs. Elgin, Illinois: Brethren Publishing House, 1922.
- "Christmas (The) Adoration: a Christmas cantata for Church choirs and choral societies." Dayton, Ohio: Lorenz Publishing, Co., September 6, 1920.
- "Jesus, the Shepherd True," in Glad Songs. Elgin, Illinois: Brethren Publishing House, 1922.
- "Mother and home : a Mother's Day exercise." Cincinnati, Ohio: Standard Publishing Co., 1920.
- "O Loving Savior" (lyrics set to a German tune), in Glad Songs No. 6. Elgin, Illinois: Brethren Publishing House, 1922.
- "Old Cabin Home Minstrels." Dayton, Ohio: Lorenz Publishing Co., 1921.
- "The Golden Rule," in Glad Songs. Elgin, Illinois: Brethren Publishing House, 1922.
- "The Resurrection Story" (cantata, 1923).

1930s:

- "Jesus, the Savior, was crucified," in Music for the Junior Choir. Chicago, Illinois: Rodeheaver Co., 1930.
- "Keep the Light Burning for Him," in Music for the Junior Choir. Chicago, Illinois: Rodeheaver Co., 1930.
- "Spring cheer: Children's day service." Dayton, Ohio: Lorenz Publishing Co., 1937.

Posthumous publication:

- "Let me walk and talk with thee," in Special Songs for Special Singers Number 2. Nashville, Tennessee: John T. Benson Publishing Co., 1958.
- "Little baby in the manger," in Songs for Primary Children. Cincinnati, Ohio: Standard Publishing Co., 1958.
- "Marching, marching all together, always," in Happy Songs for Boys and Girls. Washington, D.C.: Review & Herald, 1952.
- "Our tender loving Father, we come," in Songs for Primary Children. Cincinnati, Ohio: Standard Publishing Co., 1958.
- "Touch not, taste not," in Happy Songs for Boys and Girls. Washington, D.C.: Review & Herald, 1952.
- "We march along with happy song," in Songs for Primary Children. Cincinnati, Ohio: Standard Publishing Co., 1958.
