= George P. Frank =

American politician

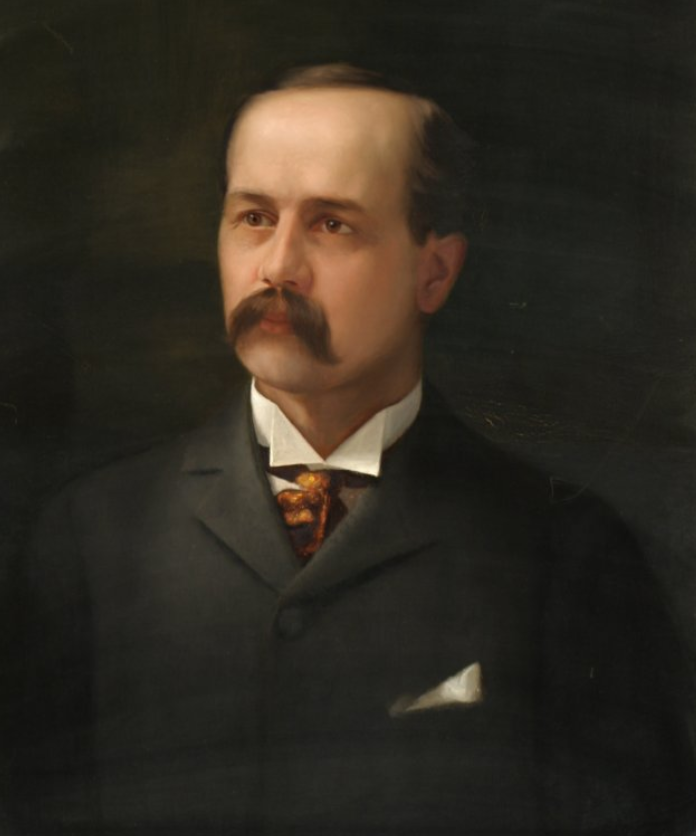

29th Mayor of Portland, Oregon
- In office 1894–1896
- Preceded by: William S. Mason
- Succeeded by: Sylvester Pennoyer

Personal details
- Born: June 11, 1852 Granville, New York, U.S.
- Died: August 24, 1896 (aged 44) Long Beach, Washington, U.S.
- Party: Republican

George P. Frank (June 11, 1852 – August 24, 1896) served as mayor of Portland, Oregon from 1894 to 1896.

The October 18, 2012, edition of the Portland Mercury listed Frank as the Third Worst Mayor in Portland history because he "handily won the election thanks to a flood that kept voter turnout low while he paid drunken repeat voters with free booze to cast ballots in every precinct they could."

== Family ==
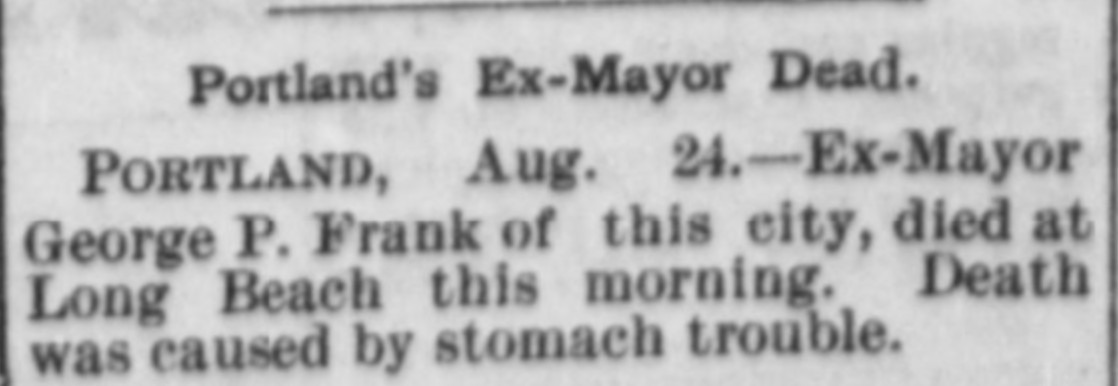
Frank's obituary in the Salem Daily Capital Journal, August 24, 1896.

Frank's father was Alfred S. Frank, and he had two brothers, Alfred and Fred, and one sister, Jennie. He predeceased his father, who died in January 1908.

Preceded by William S. Mason	Mayor of Portland, Oregon; 1894–1896	Succeeded by Sylvester Pennoyer
