= John J. McGilvra =

American judge (1827–1903)

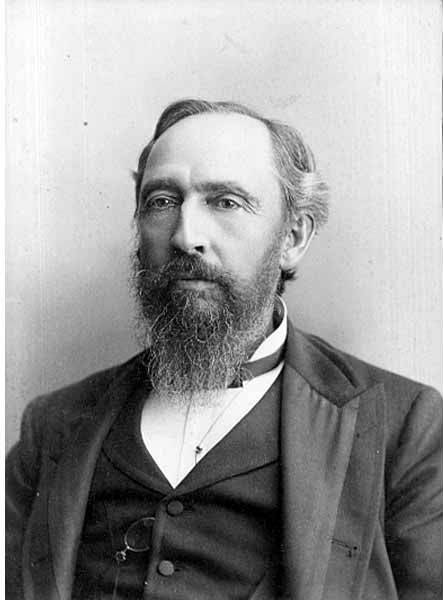
- McGilvra c. 1890, photograph held by the University of Washington
- Born: July 11, 1827; Livingston County, New York
- Died: December 19, 1903
- Occupations: Lawyer; judge

John J. McGilvra (July 11, 1827 – December 19, 1903) was a prominent lawyer and judge in late 19th century Seattle, Washington. Rev. Harvey K. Hines, D.D. in An Illustrated History of the State of Washington (1893) described him as "the oldest member of the legal profession in Seattle, Washington, both in years and practice" and "the father of the Seattle bar." McGilvra was a prominent early resident of Seattle and the McGilvra family home was on the west shore of Lake Washington in Seattle's Madison Park neighborhood. Thomas E. Peiser photographed it August 2, 1900. It was known as 'Laurel Shade' and served as a shipping terminal for the neighborhood before the extension of Madison Street.

== Early life ==
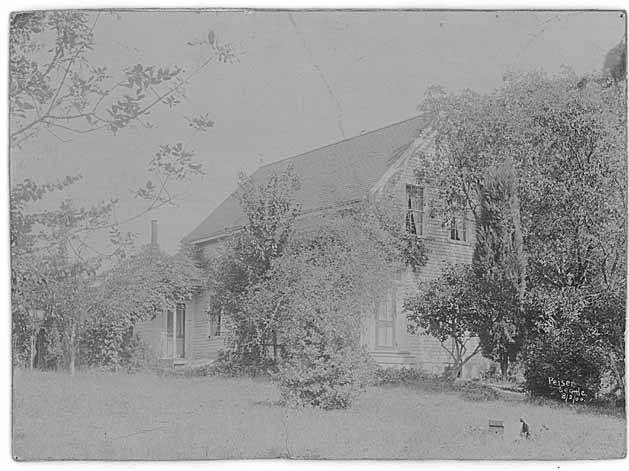
McGilvra family home in 1900

McGilvra's family was originally of Scottish origin (Clan Macgillivray). His great-grandfather emigrated to the American colonies prior to the American Revolutionary War, and settled in New York State.

McGilvra's parents, John and Margaret (Grant) McGilvra, were natives of New York, and settled after their marriage, in Livingston County, New York. There McGilvra was born July 11, 1827. He was reared on the farm and attended the schools of that county until 1844, when he moved with his parents to Illinois, where he taught school for several winters, and in the summer attended the seminary at Elgin, Illinois.

McGilvra commenced the study of law in 1850, under the direction of Edward Gifford, a graduate of Yale College and the Cambridge Law School. He finished his studies in Chicago, Illinois under Ebenezer Peek, subsequently one of the Judges of the Court of Claims, and was admitted to the bar in 1853. He at once entered into practice, and was quite successful. He was married in Chicago in 1855 to Elizabeth M. Hills, a native of Oneida County, New York. They were to have five children: Floyd, who died before his tenth birthday, Carrie E., later the wife of Judge Thomas Burke; Oliver C.; Lillian, and the youngest, Minnie, who died at seven years old. The young children are buried with their parents at Lakeview Cemetery in Seattle. He did not engage in politics except to show his colors in private conversation and at the polls; but, having known President Abraham Lincoln for a number of years, he was appointed by him in 1861 as the United States Attorney for the Territory of Washington. He arrived with his family in Olympia, Washington in June 1861.

The Territory then embraced the three northern counties of Idaho as well as the present Washington State, and contained a population of less than 12,000. He traveled over the Territory twice a year, attending courts, in many instances prosecuting for the Territory, and looking after such civil business as came in his way, as well as conducting the business of the United States, which kept him busily occupied. Having an extensive practice and becoming weary of so much travel, he settled in Seattle in 1864, and declined a reappointment, although he was not relieved until the following year. He was the first resident attorney who settled in Seattle, and for many years was on one side of nearly every case on the docket. John McGilvra served as the founding president (1886–1889) of the King County Bar Association. He practiced his profession in King and adjoining counties until about 1890, when he withdrew from the firm of McGilvra, Blain & DeVries, and retired from practice. He maintained a primary residence in Seattle until his death in 1903, although he traveled extensively in the United States and Europe.

== Legal career ==
McGilvra served one term in the Territorial Legislature of 1866–67, and during the session procured an appropriation of US$2,500 for a wagon road across the Cascade Mountains through the Snoqualmie Pass. This amount was supplemented by an appropriation of like amount from King County and by later appropriations and contributions the road was kept open, and for many years was the only means of communication across the Cascade Mountains north of the Columbia River.

In 1873, immediately after the location of the Northern Pacific Railway terminus at Tacoma, Washington Judge McGilvra, with others, proceeded to organize the Seattle & Walla Walla Railroad Company. He drew the articles of incorporation and all the papers and documents connected with that enterprise, and served as the attorney of the incorporation some two years without compensation. The people of Seattle, entirely unaided by capital from abroad, constructed and put into operation twenty-one miles of road from Seattle to Newcastle, Washington coal mines. Subsequently they carried another branch of road up the Cedar River to the Black Diamond and Franklin coal mines. That enterprise, which was undertaken at a critical time in the history of Seattle, had the effect to stay the confidence of the citizens, and assisted materially in building up the town in spite of all opposition, and the discrimination against it by the Northern Pacific Railroad.

In 1876 the Northern Pacific Railroad abandoned its northern line, the Skagit Branch through Skagit Pass (now known as Cascade Pass), and located its road south of Mount Rainier, through what was known as Packwood or Cowlitz Pass. Their checkerboarded railroad grants extended throughout almost the entire Territory allowing them to block other rail routes, including the abandoned Skagit Pass route. In Seattle, this became the subject of public agitation. Funds were raised and Judge McGilvra was sent to Washington, where he passed two winters in an effort to procure a restoration of those lands to the public domain in the interests of settlers.

The Judge was offered every possible facility for doing effective work before Congress. He was given the privilege of the floor of the United States House of Representatives by the Speaker, and, through the courtesy of Senator John H. Mitchell of Oregon, he had practically the same privilege on the floor of the Senate. He appeared before each committee of the Senate and House to which the various bills introduced upon this subject were referred, and made oral arguments and submitted printed briefs, and finally succeeded in restoring to settlement those lands, amounting to upward of 5,000,000 acres (20,000 km^{2}). Judge Orange Jacobs, then delegate from Washington, assisted in this work.

While he was City Attorney of the city of Seattle, in 1876 and '77, the east half of the Maynard donation claim, embracing 320 acres (1.3 km^{2}) now in the heart of the city, was declared to be vacant public land by the Commissioner of the General Land Office. The city of Seattle applied to enter these lands under the town-site laws. As City Attorney, Judge McGilvra made the application and argued the case before the Register and Receiver of the United States General Land Office at Olympia. There were several contestants who had filed homestead and pre-emption claims on the same lands.

Obtaining a favorable decision from the Land Office, the case was appealed to the Commissioner of the United States General Land Office, who affirmed the decision of the local land office. Subsequently, and after the expiration of Judge McGilvra's term of office, the case was complicated by the intervention of other parties claiming the right to locate the land with Valentine scrip. The result was that the city finally lost the case through the inattention or incompetency of the attorney who represented the case.

Among McGilvra's business partners in his law firms were James McNaught, who served in the 1890s as attorney for the Northern Pacific Railroad Company; and his son-in-law Judge Thomas Burke.

After retiring, McGilvra retained an office in Seattle and continued to be involved in projects for the city's and state's improvement. In the early 1890s he was opposed to Seattle's then proposed system of parks and boulevards, which he saw as a massive government subsidy to real estate men. Despite McGilvra's opposition, it went into effect, and Seattle Parks and Recreation was created.

In retirement, McGilvra spent much of his time traveling with his family, and visited nearly all portions of the Pacific Coast of North America, from Alaska to Mexico CIty, also many portions of the interior and Atlantic coast as far south as Florida. He also visited England, Scotland, France, Switzerland, Austria, Germany and Belgium. Letters written on his European trip were published in the Seattle papers.

== Land dealings ==
In 1864, McGilvra purchased 420 acres (1.7 km^{2}) of land bordering Lake Washington and constructed the Lake Washington wagon road, now Madison Street (Seattle), at a personal expense of $1,500. To this day, Madison Street remains the only direct route from Lake Washington to Elliott Bay in Downtown Seattle. He continued to improve his property, and was one of the first contributors to the Madison Street cable road, which he subsidized by giving twenty-one acres of property on Lake Washington for park and terminal facilities.

== Legacy ==
McGilvra is the namesake for Seattle's McGilvra Elementary School and McGilvra Boulevard (both near Madison Park).
