= Sylvester Pennoyer =

American politician

8th Governor of Oregon
- In office January 12, 1887 – January 14, 1895
- Preceded by: Zenas Ferry Moody
- Succeeded by: William Paine Lord

30th Mayor of Portland, Oregon
- In office 1896–1898
- Preceded by: George P. Frank
- Succeeded by: William S. Mason

Personal details
- Born: July 6, 1831 Groton, New York, US
- Died: May 30, 1902 (aged 70) Portland, Oregon, US
- Party: Democrat-People's
- Spouse: Mary A. Allen (m. 1856)
- Children: 5
- Education: Harvard University (LLB)
- Occupation: Politician, lawyer

Sylvester Pennoyer (July 6, 1831 – May 30, 1902) was an American educator, attorney, and politician in Oregon. A Democrat, he served two terms as the eighth governor of Oregon from 1887 to 1895. He joined the Populist cause in the early 1890s and became the second Populist Party state governor in history. He was noted for his political radicalism, his opposition to the conservative Bourbon Democracy of President Grover Cleveland, his support for labor unions, and his opposition to the Chinese in Oregon. He was also noted for his prickly attitude toward both U.S. Presidents whose terms overlapped his own, Benjamin Harrison and Cleveland, whom he once famously told via telegram to "mind his own business."

He later served as mayor of Portland from 1896 to 1898.

== Early life ==
Sylvester Pennoyer was born in Groton, New York, on July 6, 1831. His parents were Elizabeth Howland and Justus P. Pennoyer, a New York state legislator and a wealthy farmer. Sylvester attended school at Homer Academy and then began teaching. He graduated from Harvard Law School in 1854. He moved to Oregon on July 10, 1855, where he resumed teaching.

In 1856 he married Mary A. Allen, with whom he had five children. While teaching, he also practiced law. Pennoyer was chosen as the superintendent of Multnomah County schools in 1860, and served until 1862. He then shifted to the lumber industry from 1862 to 1868, accumulating a fortune. He then purchased the Democratic-leaning Oregon Herald newspaper and served as editor until he sold it in 1869.

In 1866, Marcus Neff hired attorney John H. Mitchell to complete some legal business, but failed to pay Mitchell's bill. Mitchell sued and received a default judgment against Neff, with Neff's property sold at auction to pay the bill. Pennoyer purchased the land from Mitchell, who had purchased the land at the sheriff's auction, and later Neff became aware of the forced sale. Neff then sued Pennoyer to regain the property in a case that became the U.S. Supreme Court case of Pennoyer v. Neff that defined legal jurisdiction for citizens residing in different states. At the trial, federal judge and Pennoyer adversary Matthew Deady ruled in favor of Neff, with the Supreme Court affirming the decision in 1877. Pennoyer was compelled to give the land back to Neff, and the property became a part of the Willamette Heights neighborhood in later years.

== Political career ==
Pennoyer was a Democrat most of his political career, but became a Populist in the early 1890s. In 1885 he ran for mayor of Portland, but lost to John Gates, partly due to his record of sympathy for the Confederacy during the American Civil War. The following year he ran for Governor of Oregon against T. R. Cornelius, gaining support for advocating the use of American labor over Chinese immigrants. Pennoyer was elected in November and assumed office on January 12, 1887. He was re-elected in 1890 and served in the office until his second term ended on January 14, 1895.

=== Governor of Oregon ===
As governor, Pennoyer quickly made a name for himself as a quirky and cantankerous leader. In 1891 he pointedly snubbed President Benjamin Harrison when Harrison visited Oregon on a campaign tour. He refused to leave his office to meet Harrison at the state border. When Harrison came to Salem, Pennoyer kept him waiting in the train station (in the rain) and arrived 10 minutes late. That year the Oregon Legislative Assembly created the Oregon Attorney General office, and Pennoyer appointed George Earle Chamberlain to that post. While in office Pennoyer declared without authority that the Oregon Supreme Court lacked the power to invalidate legislative acts on constitutional grounds.

In 1893 he refused to grant the state Democrats permission to use the state's ceremonial cannon to fire a salute in celebration of Grover Cleveland's inauguration as president. (Pennoyer had just left the Democratic Party to become the second Populist Party governor in history.) "No permission will be given to use state cannon for firing a salute over the inauguration of a Wall Street plutocrat as president of the United States," he said, and locked the cannon away under armed guard. The Democrats were able to get hold of the cannon by using an unpaid blacksmith's bill for $10 as a pretext to have the sheriff seize the weapon, and the salute was fired on schedule.

Pennoyer's relationship with Cleveland did not improve noticeably with time. Just a few months later, on May 3, 1893, he refused to use his resources to protect Chinese Americans when asked to do so by Grover Cleveland's Secretary of State on May 3, 1893. (Congress had just extended the Chinese Exclusion Act of 1882 for an additional 10 years, and the president was worried about possible riots.) His telegraphed response to this request read, "Washington: I will attend to my business. Let the president attend to his."

Pennoyer refused another request from Cleveland, who asked him to intervene when a group of unemployed workers, part of "Coxey's Army", hijacked a train to travel east and join a mass march on Washington, D.C. Pennoyer stated, "let Cleveland's' army take care of Coxey's army." He also moved Thanksgiving Day in Oregon one week ahead of the national holiday in 1894 in further protest to President Cleveland's request. His term as governor ended on January 14, 1895.

Throughout his terms in office, Pennoyer had an antagonistic relationship with Oregonian newspaper editor Harvey Scott, who referred to him in editorials as "His Eccentricity."

=== Mayor of Portland ===
On June 1, 1896, Pennoyer was elected the mayor of Portland. Previously, while governor, he had opposed the Bull Run Water Project, and at one point he vetoed a request for a $500,000 bond to finance its construction, claiming the water, because it originated in glaciers, would "cause goiter to the fair sex of Portland." The legislature came within one vote of overriding this veto, but it stood, and Judge Matthew Deady—who had drafted it—was so put out that he called the governor "Sylpester Annoyer." Ironically, during Pennoyer's term as mayor it fell to him to take the ceremonial first sip at the new water system's dedication ceremony. He took his drink of Bull Run water, set the goblet down and said, "No flavor. No body. Give me the old Willamette."

He was the second mayor to sit in the new City Hall that was completed in 1895. Pennoyer described the building as "expensive, unseemly and unhealthful." He served as mayor until June 1898 when his successor W. S. Mason took office.

== Death and legacy ==
Pennoyer donated land to Portland to serve as a park, originally known as Pennoyer Park and now known as Governor's Park. He died of heart disease in his home in Portland on May 30, 1902, at 4:00 p.m. He was initially buried at Lone Fir Cemetery in Portland, but in 1924 his remains were moved to River View Cemetery.

Party political offices
Preceded by Joseph Showalter Smith	Democratic nominee for Governor of Oregon; 1886, 1890	Succeeded by William Galloway
Political offices
Preceded by Z. F. Moody	Governor of Oregon; 1887-1895	Succeeded by William Paine Lord
Preceded by George P. Frank	Mayor of Portland, Oregon; 1896-1898	Succeeded by William S. Mason
