= Portland Building =

Historic building in Portland, Oregon, U.S.

The Portland Building
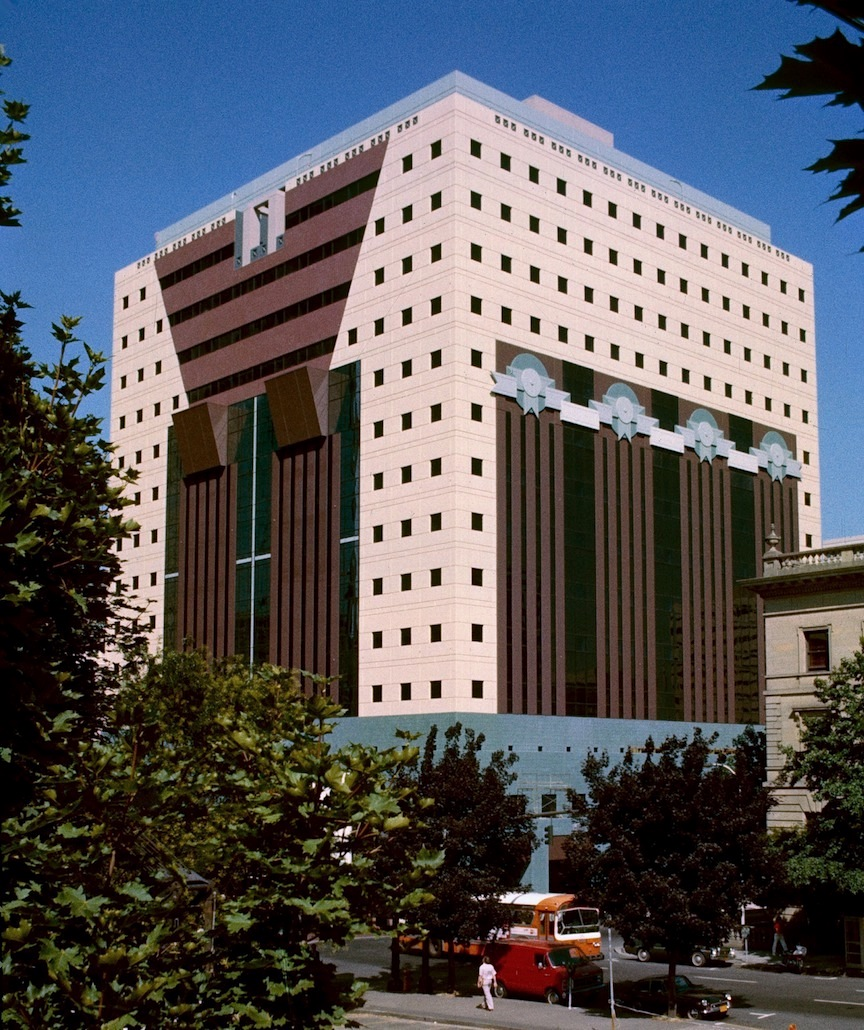
- Viewed from the southwest in 1982

- Location within Portland, Oregon
- Alternative names: Portland Municipal Services Building

General information
- Type: Government offices
- Architectural style: Postmodern
- Location: 1120 SW 5th Avenue; Portland, Oregon
- Coordinates: 45.515635°N 122.678675°W
- Completed: 1982
- Opening: October 2, 1982
- Cost: US$41.2 million
- Owner: City of Portland

Height
- Roof: 70.41 m (231.0 ft)

Technical details
- Floor count: 15

Design and construction
- Architects: Michael Graves; Emery Roth & Sons
- Structural engineer: Desimone Consulting Engineers
- Main contractor: Hoffman Construction; Pavarini Mcgovern Construction

Renovating team
- Architect: DLR Group
- Main contractor: Howard S. Wright Construction

References
- Portland Public Service Building
- U.S. National Register of Historic Places
- Architectural style: Postmodern
- NRHP reference No.: 11000770
- Added to NRHP: October 25, 2011

The Portland Building, alternatively referenced as the Portland Municipal Services Building, is a 15-story municipal office building located at 1120 SW 5th Avenue in downtown Portland, Oregon. Built at a cost of US$29 million, it opened in 1982 and was considered architecturally groundbreaking at the time.

The building houses offices of the City of Portland and is located adjacent to Portland City Hall. It was added to the National Register of Historic Places in 2011. An extensive reconstruction of the building began in December 2017 and was completed in 2020. The building was temporarily closed for that work, and the closure was extended by the COVID-19 pandemic.

== History ==
The distinctive look of Michael Graves' Portland Building, with its use of a variety of surface materials and colors, small windows, and inclusion of prominent decorative flourishes, was in stark contrast to the architectural style most commonly used for large office buildings at the time, and made the building an icon of postmodern architecture. It is the first major postmodern tall office building, opening before Philip Johnson's AT&T Building, and its design has been described as a rejection of the Modernist principles established in the early 20th century.

Graves' design was selected in a large design competition, with Johnson as one of the three members of the selection committee. Graves was added into the competition after Johnson threw out the entry from architect Gunnar Birkerts for having not been Postmodern enough. Birkerts went on to design the Detroit Institute of Arts South Wing, which was re-clad by Graves in 2007.

Portland Mayor Frank Ivancie was among those who expressed the opinion that the modernist style, then being applied to most large office buildings, had begun to make some American cities' downtowns look "boring", with most of the newer, large buildings being covered in glass and steel, and largely lacking in design features that would make them stand out. The reaction among architects was mixed, with many criticizing the design while others embraced it as a welcome departure. In 1985, the hammered-copper statue Portlandia was added above the front entrance.

Beyond questions of style, many structural flaws came to light shortly after the building's completion. The building's failings are the subject of much humor and contempt by the civil servants who work there, who describe it as cheaply built and a challenging place to work.

In 1990, only eight years after it was built, the lobby and food court were in need of remodeling. Four firms, including Michael Graves, were bidding for the job. Karen Nichols of Michael Graves's firm said "Michael feels like he owes the city one.... We have done a lot of public buildings since then. I do know we talk about the Portland Building all the time."

=== Reconstruction ===
In 2014, some city commissioners expressed the view that the building should be demolished due to extensive water infiltration and structural issues. The consensus among the city commissioners was mixed, with one member calling the building a "white elephant", while others opposed the demolition. Michael Graves fiercely opposed demolition. In 2015, city officials were considering spending $175 million to fully renovate the building.

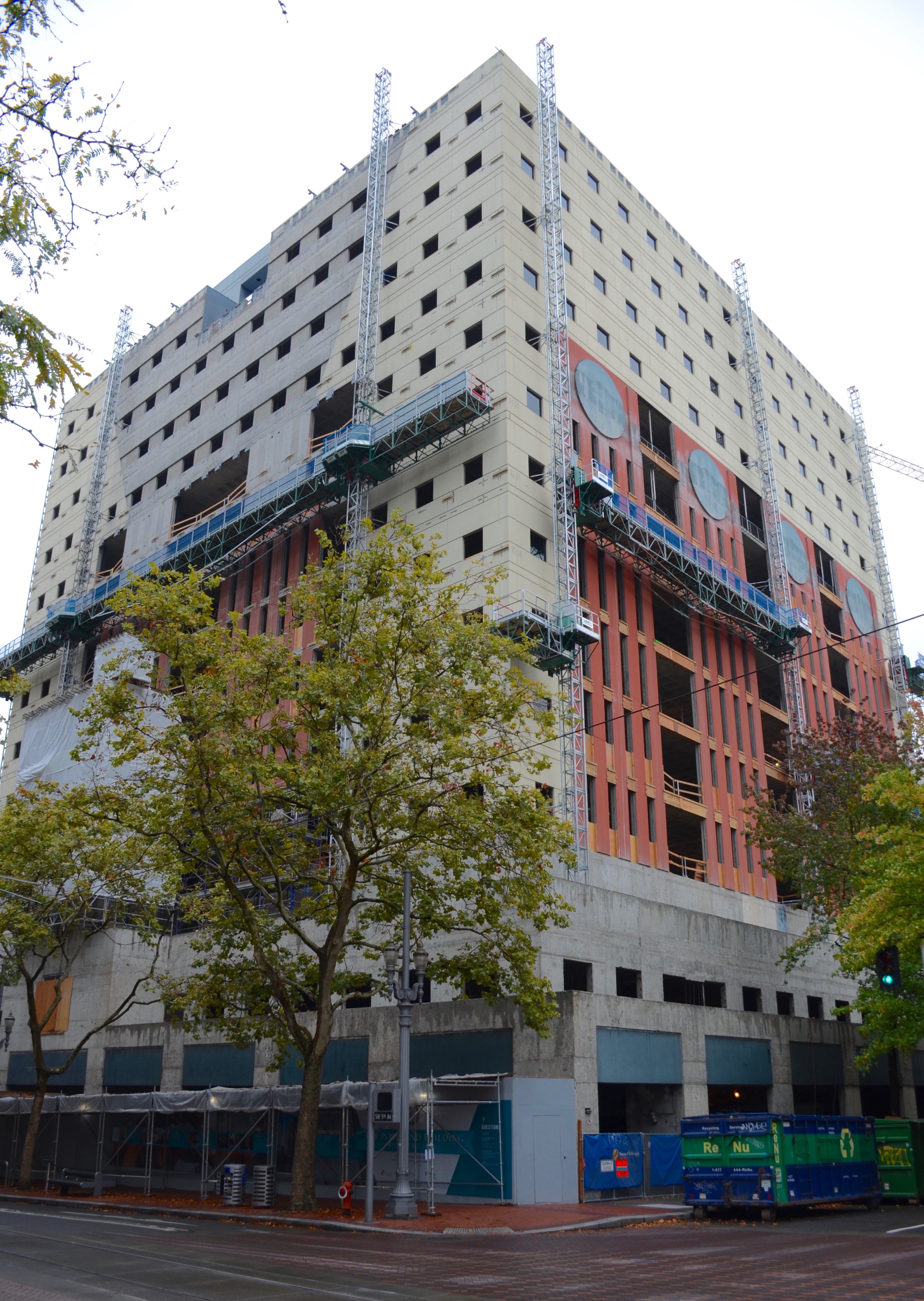
Reconstruction under way in October 2018

In July 2016, plans to renovate the building moved ahead, with the city council choosing a contractor and setting a maximum cost of $140 million for the work, not including estimated non-construction expenses of up to $55 million, such as for the leasing of office space for around 1,300 city employees who will be temporarily displaced during the renovation work. The contractors for the project are architecture firm DLR Group and Howard S. Wright Construction.

The renovation retains the building's basic postmodern architectural style while changing some of the building materials to better withstand weather and earthquakes, and improve interiors for employee satisfaction. The teal colored tiles of the lower three floors would be replaced with larger terracotta rainscreen tiles, the existing painted concrete facade would be covered by a new aluminum rainscreen cladding, the existing dark tinted windows would be replaced with clear glass windows, and the stucco garlands on the side of the building will be rebuilt using formed aluminum. The building envelope was replaced using a unitized curtain wall, allowing the design to reflect Graves's original while repairing years of moisture seeping into the facade and preventing further water damage. The Portland Docomomo International chapter decried the building's renovation, claiming that the replacement of the building's material would threaten the building's landmark status.

Work on the extensive rebuilding, known by the city as the Portland Building Reconstruction Project, began in fall 2017, with interior demolition work, followed by an official groundbreaking in December. The project was expected to take about three years, with completion around the end of 2020. The Portlandia statue was covered by a shroud, to protect it from potential damage during the work; the covering was removed in September 2019. The statue also underwent preservation work during this period. As of September 2018, the ongoing project remained on-schedule.

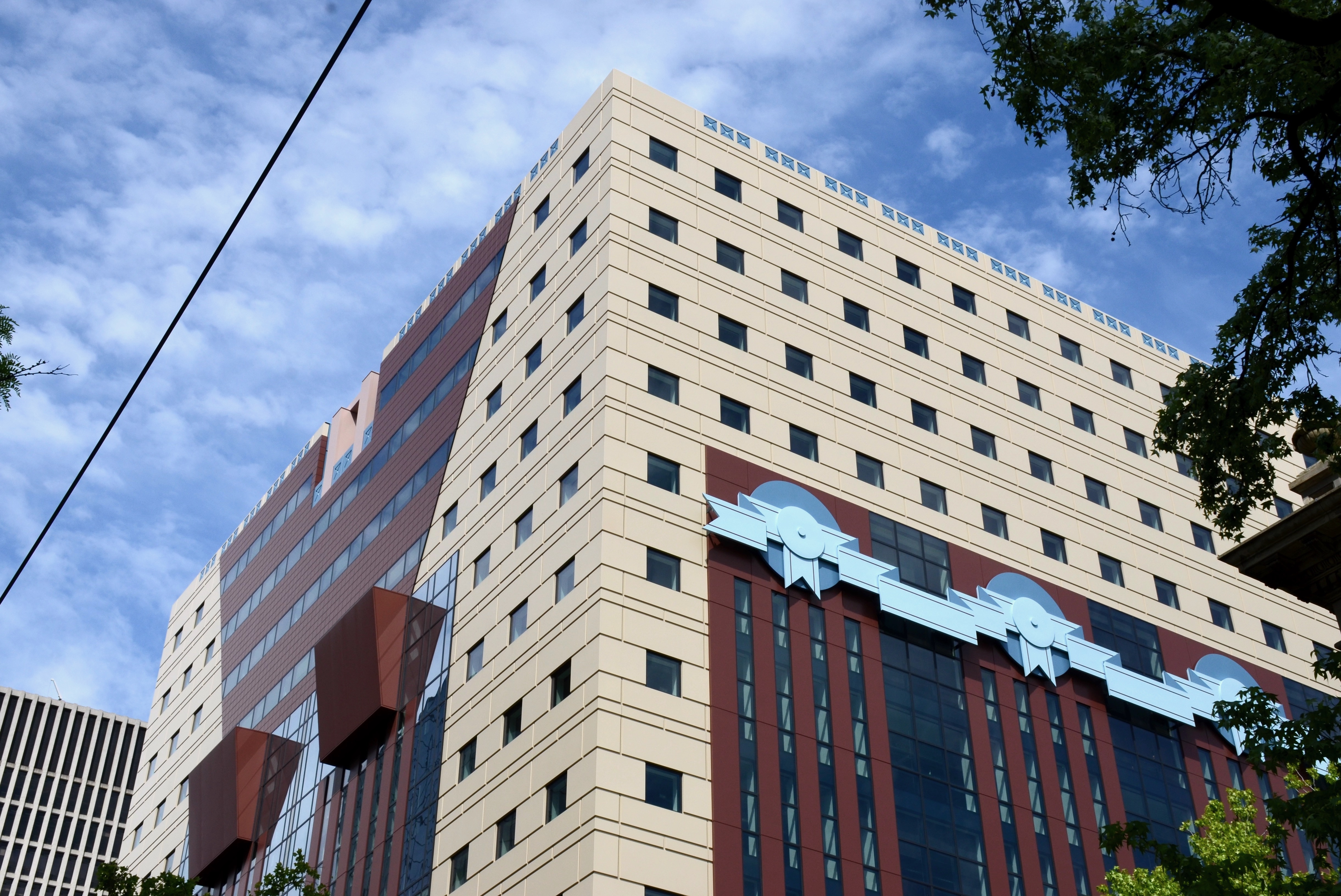
In 2021, after renovation

By early 2020, the reconstruction work was sufficiently close to completion that around 1,700 city employees began moving back into the building; the move-in was spread over eleven weekends and was completed in March 2020. However, almost immediately afterward, the COVID-19 pandemic effectively reversed the building's return to use, as most staff were instructed to work from home during the pandemic, and a planned March 19, 2020, event to celebrate the building's reopening was canceled.

Only about 30 employees were working in the building in August 2020, and the city was predicting that most employees in the departments that use the Portland Building would continue working from home until sometime in 2021. As of August 2020, renovation work on the interiors of the first floors was continuing but was expected to be finished by the end of the year. The work was completed by October 2020. The George Floyd and police brutality protests in Portland in 2020 were centered near the building.

== Features ==
The roof of the Portland Building is covered with a green roof, installed in 2006. The roof was proposed in 2005, part of an experiment through Oregon State University to test Sedum spathulifolium as a water-absorbing plant for the northwest. The new roof will help the building's heating, cooling, and storm-water runoff systems.

== Offices ==
As of October 2009, the Portland Building housed these municipal bureaus and departments: Office of Cable Communications & Franchise Management, Bureau of Environmental Services, Facilities Services, Bureau of Human Resources, Office of Management and Finance, Mt. Hood Cable Regulatory Commission, Bureau of Parks and Recreation, Bureau of Purchases, Bureau of Risk Management, Bureau of Technology Services, Bureau of Transportation, and the Portland Water Bureau. The Portland Building is located across SW Madison Street from Portland City Hall.

== Reception ==
In May 1983, the building won an American Institute of Architects honor award. Ada Louise Huxtable of The New York Times called the Portland Building a "competition-winning, postmodernist exercise of romantic classical persuasion" that contrasted sharply with the exactly-contemporary State of Illinois Center in Chicago.

The building's style is controversial among Portlanders as well as the entire architecture field. In 1990, The Oregonian stated "it's hard to find anyone who doesn't like Pioneer Courthouse Square.... it's even harder to find anyone who admits to liking the Portland Building." Italian-born modernist architect Pietro Belluschi called the building "totally wrong" and declared: "It's not architecture, it's packaging. I said at the time that there were only two good things about it: 'It will put Portland on the map, architecturally, and it will never be repeated.'" By contrast, architectural critic Paul Goldberger said, "For better or for worse, the Portland Building overshadows other things. It is more significant for what it did than how well it does it. It had a profound effect on American architecture and brought a return to classicism that brought us better buildings."

In October 2009, Travel + Leisure magazine called the Portland Building "one of the most hated buildings in America". Oregonian columnist David Sarasohn revisited the theme in 2014, noting that the "huge blue tiles, colored glass and odd pastel flourishes meant to evoke early modern French paintings" actually resembled "something designed by a Third World dictator's mistress' art-student brother."

DLR Group's reconstruction work on the building was recognized with an American Architecture Award in 2021.

== See also ==
- Architecture of Portland, Oregon
- Public Service Building (Portland, Oregon)
