= 1882 Oregon gubernatorial election =

- June 5, 1882
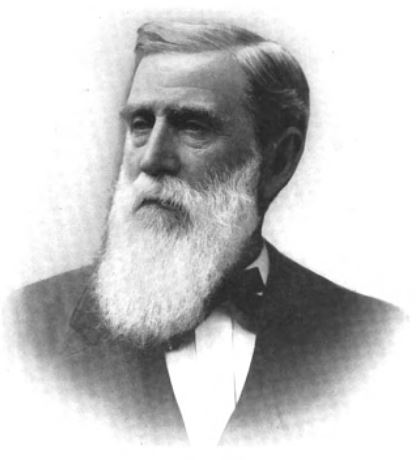

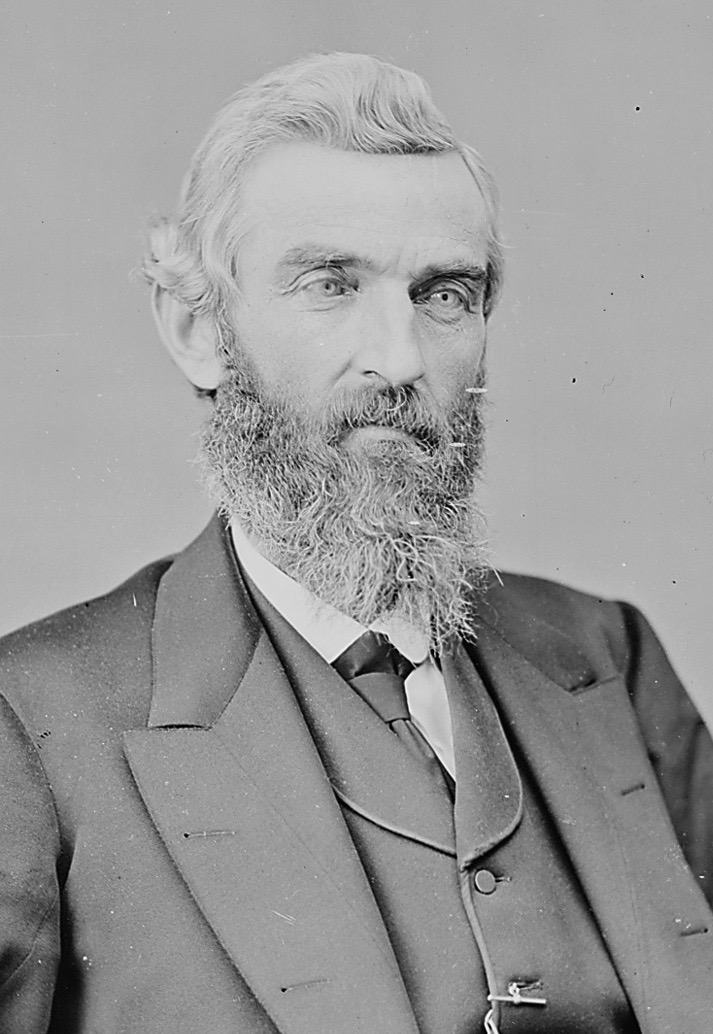
Nominee	Zenas Ferry Moody	Joseph Showalter Smith
Party	Republican	Democratic
Popular vote	21,481	20,029
Percentage	51.75%	48.25%
- County results Moody: 50–60% 60–70% Smith: 50–60% 60–70%
Governor before election
W. W. Thayer
Democratic
Elected Governor
Z. F. Moody
Republican

The 1882 Oregon gubernatorial election took place on June 5, 1882, to elect the governor of the U.S. state of Oregon. The election matched Republican Zenas Ferry Moody, Speaker of the Oregon House of Representatives, against Democrat Joseph Showalter Smith, former member of the United States House of Representatives.

== Results ==
1882 Oregon gubernatorial election
Party	Candidate	Votes	%	±%
Republican	Zenas F. Moody	21,481	51.75%	+5.92%
Democratic	Joseph S. Smith	20,029	48.25%	+2.22%
Write-in	Scattering	3	0.01%	
Total votes		41,513	100.00%	
Majority		1,452	3.50%	
Republican gain from Democratic		Swing	+3.69%	

=== Results by county ===
County	Zenas F. Moody Republican		Joseph S. Smith Democratic		Margin		Total votes cast
County	#	%	#	%	#	%	Total votes cast
Baker	484	43.80%	621	56.20%	-137	-12.40%	1,105
Benton	916	50.11%	910	49.78%	6	0.33%	1,828 (Note: Includes 2 Scattering votes)
Clackamas	1,076	54.34%	904	45.66%	172	8.69%	1,980
Clatsop	632	52.40%	573	47.51%	59	4.89%	1,206 (Note: Includes 1 Scattering vote)
Columbia	327	58.81%	229	41.19%	98	17.63%	556
Coos	646	54.10%	548	45.90%	98	8.21%	1,194
Curry	138	53.49%	120	46.51%	18	6.98%	258
Douglas	1,364	51.49%	1,285	48.51%	79	2.98%	2,649
Grant	480	52.57%	433	47.43%	47	5.15%	913
Jackson	629	39.00%	984	61.00%	-355	-22.01%	1,613
Josephine	201	40.04%	301	59.96%	-100	-19.92%	502
Lake	224	38.75%	354	61.25%	-130	-22.49%	578
Lane	1,064	47.78%	1,163	52.22%	-99	-4.45%	2,227
Linn	1,344	44.59%	1,670	55.41%	-326	-10.82%	3,014
Marion	2,030	60.33%	1,335	39.67%	695	20.65%	3,365
Multnomah	3,887	62.28%	2,354	37.72%	1,533	24.56%	6,241
Polk	802	50.38%	790	49.62%	12	0.75%	1,592
Tillamook	149	59.13%	103	40.87%	46	18.25%	252
Umatilla	1,262	45.27%	1,526	54.73%	-264	-9.47%	2,788
Union	790	44.16%	999	55.84%	-209	-11.68%	1,789
Wasco	1,206	48.77%	1,267	51.23%	-61	-2.47%	2,473
Washington	818	56.45%	631	43.55%	187	12.91%	1,449
Yamhill	1,012	52.14%	929	47.86%	83	4.28%	1,941
Total	21,481	51.75%	20,029	48.25%	1,452	3.50%	41,513

==== Counties that flipped from Democratic to Republican ====
- Columbia
- Curry
- Douglas
- Polk

==== Counties that flipped from Republican to Democratic ====
- Lane
