= Henry J. Hefty =

American architect

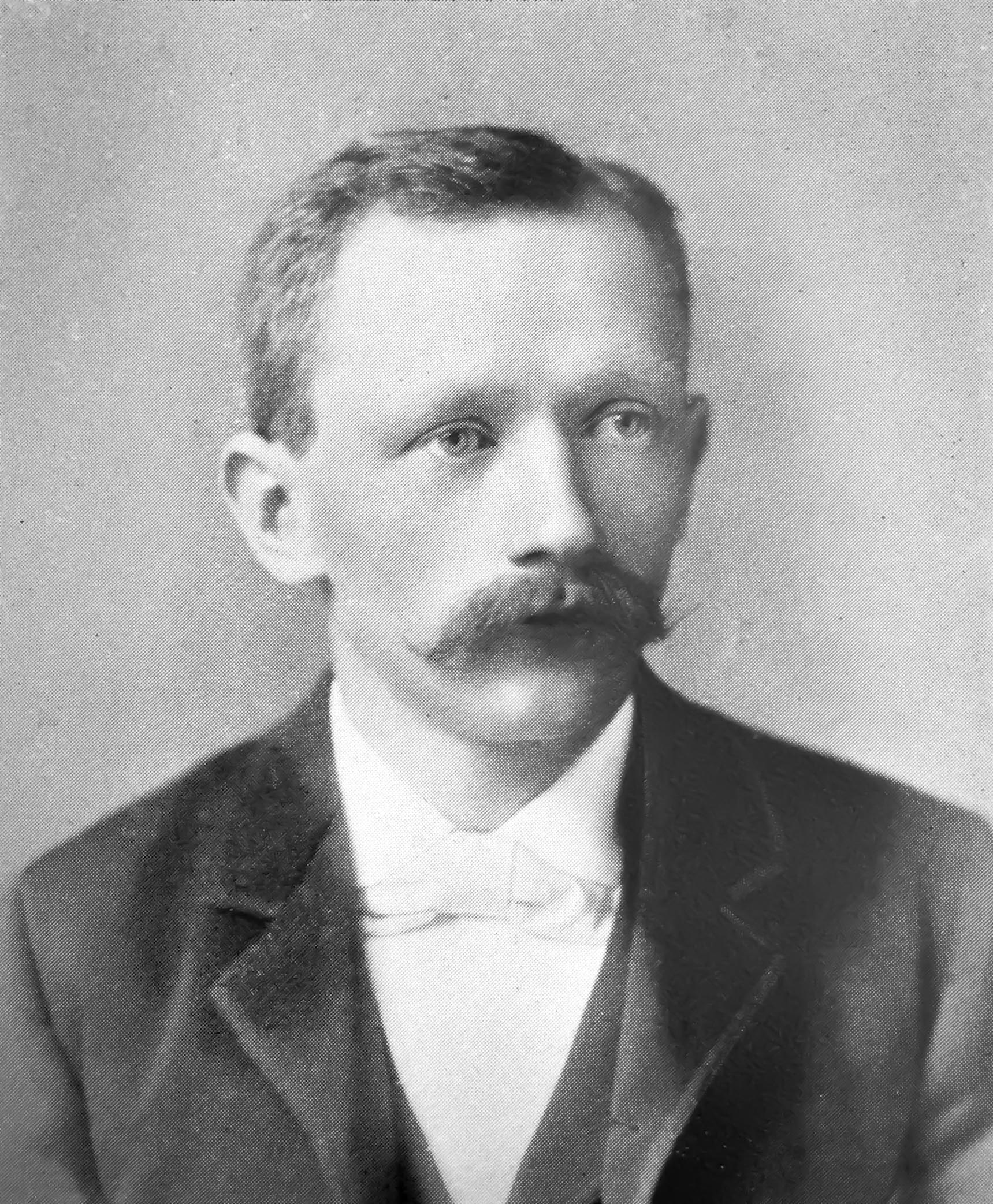
- Born: December 28, 1858; Schwanden, Switzerland
- Died: August 20, 1915 (aged 56); Weesen, Switzerland
- Occupation: Architect
- Spouse: Agatha Durst
- Children: Bessie, Edward, Alfred, Marguerite
- Buildings: First Congregational Church; Eaton Building

Henry John Hefty (December 28, 1858 – August 20, 1915) was an immigrant from Switzerland who worked as an architect based in Portland, Oregon, United States.

== Early life ==
Hefty was born Heinrich Hefti in 1858 in Schwanden, in the Swiss canton of Glarus. His father was an architect and building contractor who taught his son the principles of architecture and construction. Hefty continued his study of architecture at the Darmstadt Technical School, graduating in 1879. He immigrated to the United States in 1881, following his brother to Portland, Oregon.

He later adopted the anglicised spelling of his name.

== Career ==
Hefty began working in Portland as a building contractor, and he employed over twenty workers. Beginning in 1884, he focused entirely on architecture, designing in a variety of styles and usually incorporating at least one tower in his designs.

Most of Hefty's work is preserved only in photographs and engravings, although a few buildings remain. He designed Portland's First Congregational Church at SW Park and Madison Street, and he supervised its construction between 1889 and 1895. In 1904 Hefty designed the Eaton Hotel at SW 9th and Morrison. One of his last projects was the Buckingham Hotel in 1911, also known as the Kingston Apartments, at the intersection of West Burnside, Southwest Morrison, and Southwest 20th Place.

=== City Hall ===
One of Hefty's designs that was never completed was Portland City Hall. In 1890 Hefty won a design competition to build a new city hall. His design was massive, and its construction required a major amount of stone, iron, and brick over a two-year period at a cost of $500,000. Hefty's compensation for the project as approved by the city was $20,000. After the building's foundation was completed, the city council stopped construction, citing cost overruns. The council awarded a new contract to architects Whidden & Lewis to design a less costly, more modest building. Biographer Harvey K. Hines classified the change of architects as "political dodgery."

In 1915 Hefty died suddenly during a vacation in Switzerland. At the time, his estate was valued at $70,000.

== Partial list of buildings ==
- St. Helens Hall
- Hotel Vendome
- Washington Block
- Coleman Flats
- First Congregational Church
- Buckingham Hotel
- Eaton Building

== See also ==
- Architecture of Portland, Oregon
- History of Portland, Oregon
