= Van B. DeLashmutt =

American businessman (1842–1921)

Van Banks DeLashmutt
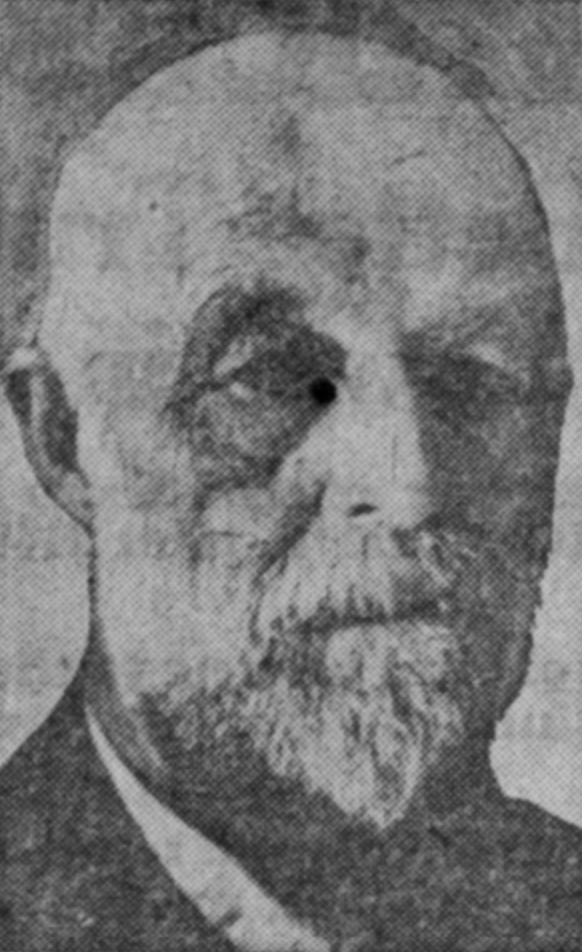
- DeLashmutt c. 1900s

27th Mayor of Portland, Oregon
- In office 1888–1891
- Preceded by: John Gates
- Succeeded by: William S. Mason
- Constituency: Portland, Oregon

Personal details
- Born: July 27, 1842 Burlington, Iowa
- Died: October 4, 1921 (aged 79) Spokane, Washington, U.S.
- Party: Republican

Van Banks DeLashmutt (July 27, 1842 – October 4, 1921) served as mayor of Portland, Oregon, from 1888 to 1891.

== Early life ==
Van B. De Lashmutt was born on July 27, 1842, in Burlington, Iowa. His family journeyed over the Oregon Trail in 1852 and settled in Polk County, Oregon. He then worked as a printer in Salem, Oregon, for Asahel Bush before moving to California. At the start of the American Civil War he was in California and joined the Union Army in 1861, serving in the Third California regiment guarding the mail routes. After he left the Army he returned to Oregon and settled in Portland.

== Portland ==
In Portland, he joined The Oregonian newspaper in June 1865 as a compositor. De Lashmutt married Maria Kelly in 1868, and they had four children, with their residence at Fourteenth and Columbia. He established a farm near Hillsboro, the Witch Hazel Farm, which became famous for his horses and race tracks. There he raised thoroughbreds and raced them on both a .5 miles (0.80 km) and 1 mile (1.6 km) track, which eventually became the community of Witch Hazel. In business, he helped start the Oregon National Bank and the Metropolitan Savings Bank, and he served as president of both banks.

On May 2, 1888, De Lashmutt was appointed as mayor of Portland after the death of Mayor John Gates. He was then elected to the position on June 18, 1888, and served until 1891, when William S. Mason took office. He became the Bank of Albina's first president in 1892.

== Later life ==
De Lashmutt left Portland for Spokane, Washington, to mine. He died there on October 4, 1921, at the age of 79. At the time of his death, he had been living in Spokane for more than 20 years.

Preceded by John Gates	Mayor of Portland, Oregon; 1888–1891	Succeeded by William S. Mason
