= United States Attorney for the District of Washington =

United States Attorney for the District of Washington is a defunct United States Attorney's office that served Washington Territory and then the state of Washington until 1906. The U.S. Attorney for Washington was the chief law enforcement officer for the United States District Court for the District of Washington. The district was succeeded by the United States Attorney for the Western District of Washington and the United States Attorney for the Eastern District of Washington.

== Office holders ==
- John S. Clendenin (1853–1855)
- B. F. Kendall (1855–1857)
- Joseph S. Smith (1857–1859)
- J. S. M. Van Cleave (1859–1860)
- Butler G. Anderson (1860–1861)
- John J. McGilvra (1861)
- Leander Holmes (1870)
- Samuel C. Wingard (1872)
- John B. Allen (1875–1885)
- William H. White (1885–1890)
- Patrick H. Winston (1890)
- William H. Brinker (1893–1897)
- Wilson R. Gay (1897–1898)
- Jesse A. Frye (1902–1906)
