= First Congregational Church (Portland, Oregon) =

Historic church in Portland, Oregon, U.S.

- U.S. National Register of Historic Places
- Portland Historic Landmark
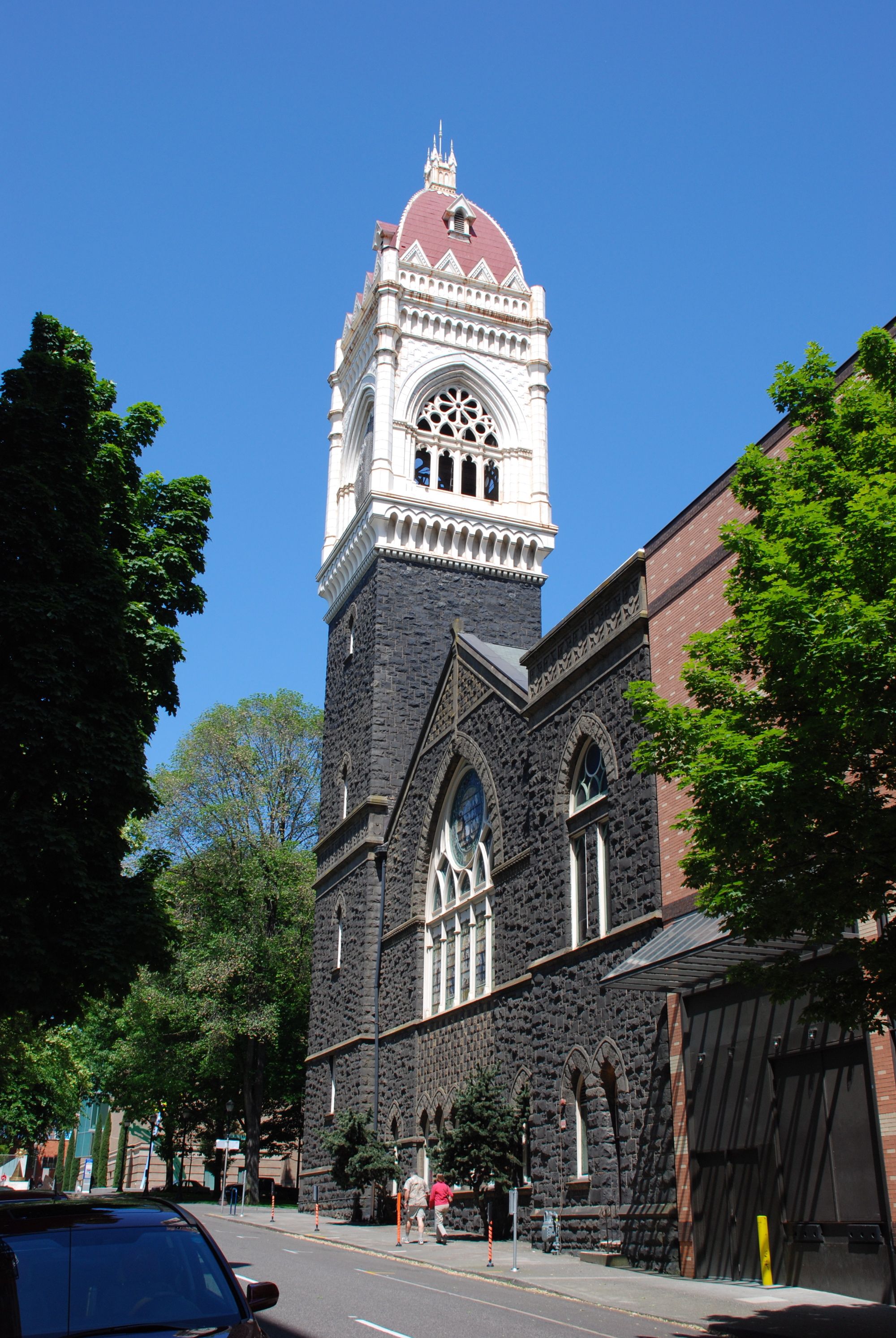
- First Congregational Church in 2009

- Location within Portland, Oregon Location within Oregon Location within the United States
- Location: 1126 SW Park Avenue; Portland, Oregon
- Coordinates: 45°30′59″N 122°40′55″W
- Area: 0.3 acres (0.12 ha)
- Built: 1889–1895
- Architect: Henry J. Hefty
- Architectural style: Gothic, Italian Gothic
- Website: www.uccportland.org
- NRHP reference No.: 75001594
- Added to NRHP: May 2, 1975

The First Congregational Church is a church located in downtown Portland, Oregon, listed on the National Register of Historic Places. Construction took place over a period of six years, from 1889 to 1895. The building was designed by Swiss architect Henry J. Hefty in Venetian Gothic style. The interior includes stained-glass windows, commissioned in 1906, made by Portland's Povey Brothers Studio. The building's height to the top of the bell tower is 175 feet (53 metres) to 185 feet.

== See also ==
- Carrie B. Wilson Adams (renowned sacred music composer and church organist during the early 20th century)
- Culture of Portland, Oregon
- Horace Lyman
- National Register of Historic Places listings in Southwest Portland, Oregon
- Religion in Portland, Oregon
