= John Gates (mayor) =

American politician (1827–1888)

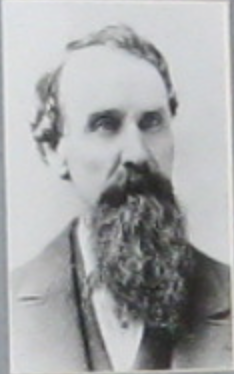

26th Mayor of Portland, Oregon
- In office June 1, 1885 – April 27, 1888
- Preceded by: J. A. Chapman
- Succeeded by: Van B. DeLashmutt

Personal details
- Born: December 31, 1827 Mercer, Maine, U.S.
- Died: April 27, 1888 (aged 60)
- Party: Republican
- Profession: Mechanical engineer

John Gates (December 31, 1827 – April 27, 1888) was an American politician who served as the 26th mayor of Portland, Oregon, from 1885 to 1888. Born in Maine, he studied engineering in Massachusetts. He moved to California in 1849 and to Oregon in 1853. He found employment with the Oregon Steam Navigation Company (OSN), becoming its chief engineer in the early 1860s. He worked for OSN for 27 years. He designed 72 steamboats and was an inventor, filing more than 30 patents during his time with OSN.

Running as the Republican candidate, he was elected in 1885 to a three-year term as mayor of Portland, defeating Sylvester Pennoyer. He died while in office, two months before the end of his term.

| Preceded by J. A. Chapman | Mayor of Portland, Oregon; 1885–1888 | Succeeded by Van B. DeLashmutt |
