= William S. Mason =

American politician

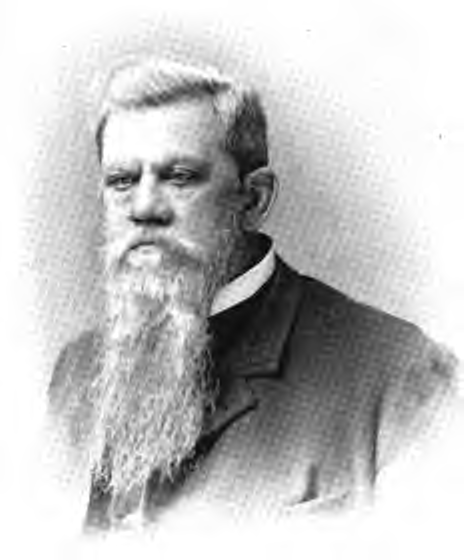
- William S. Mason in 1896

28th and 31st Mayor of Portland, Oregon
- In office 1891–1894
- Preceded by: Van B. DeLashmutt
- Succeeded by: George P. Frank
- Constituency: Portland, Oregon
- In office 1898–1899
- Preceded by: Sylvester Pennoyer
- Succeeded by: W. A. Storey

Personal details
- Born: May 25, 1832 Prince William County, Virginia, U.S.
- Died: March 27, 1899 (aged 66) Portland, Oregon, U.S.
- Party: Republican

William Spencer Mason (May 25, 1832 – March 27, 1899) served as mayor of Portland, Oregon, from 1891 to 1894 and 1898 to 1899.

== Biography ==
Mason was born in Prince William County, Virginia, on May 25, 1832. From humble origins, he began his career in railroads in the South and Midwest, continuing in San Francisco in the early 1870s, where he helped organize street railway companies. After moving to the Northwest, he helped construct the Northern Pacific line between Tacoma and Seattle.

Moving to Portland in 1881, he established McCraken & Mason, then the W. S. Mason Company, and in 1886 converted the firm into a partnership with Edward Ehrman as Mason, Ehrman & Company, a major wholesale grocery business in the Pacific Northwest. He later was president of the Portland National Bank and vice-president of the Portland Chamber of Commerce.

At the beginning of his first term as mayor, Portland consolidated with the cities of East Portland and Albina, and the city council was expanded from nine to 16 members, under a new city charter. He thrived on public contact, locating his desk in the new City Hall in 1894 in public view, and oversaw the city's recovery from the major flood of that year.

He began his second term as Portland mayor on July 1, 1898, but died before completing it. He began his second term by replacing the entire (corrupt) police department. He died on March 27, 1899, after an illness lasting about six weeks.

He devoted most of his fortune, and his wife's, to paying the depositors of the Portland National Bank during the Panic of 1893. His widow, Hannah Mason, died in 1908. Born in England and married once before, in Napa, California, she donated the property now known as Willamette Park to the City of Portland, where the Water Bureau's pumping station, dedicated in 2017, bears her name. The couple had no children.

Preceded by Van B. DeLashmutt	Mayor of Portland, Oregon; 1891–1894	Succeeded by George P. Frank
Preceded by Sylvester Pennoyer	Mayor of Portland, Oregon; 1898–1899	Succeeded by W. A. Storey
