= Zenas Ferry Moody =

7th Governor of Oregon

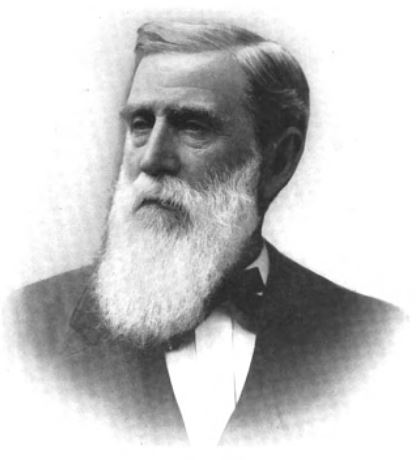
- Moody in 1903

7th Governor of Oregon
- In office September 13, 1882 – January 12, 1887
- Preceded by: W. W. Thayer
- Succeeded by: Sylvester Pennoyer

12th Speaker of the Oregon House of Representatives
- In office 1880–1881
- Preceded by: John M. Thompson
- Succeeded by: George W. McBride
- Constituency: Wasco County

Personal details
- Born: May 27, 1832 Granby, Massachusetts, U.S.
- Died: March 14, 1917 (aged 84) Salem, Oregon, U.S.
- Party: Republican
- Spouse: Mary Stephenson
- Profession: surveyor
- Office information

Zenas Ferry Moody (May 27, 1832 – March 14, 1917) was the seventh governor of Oregon from 1882 to 1887.

== Early life ==
Zenas Ferry Moody was born on May 27, 1832, in Granby, Massachusetts, to Thomas Hovey and Hannah Ferry. The family immigrated to Oregon Territory in 1851, traveling the Isthmus of Panama route. Moody was a surveyor and store keeper in Brownsville, Oregon until moving to Illinois in 1856. He then returned to Oregon in 1862 when he settled in The Dalles. At The Dalles he set up a general store and was responsible for surveying the Umatilla Indian Reservation. Then in 1865 he organized the Oregon & Montana Transportation Company. During his time in The Dalles he was a major shipper of Oregon wool from Eastern Oregon.

== Politics ==
In 1880, he was elected to the Oregon House of Representatives. During his only term there, he also served as Speaker of the House. Then in 1882, Moody was elected as the seventh Governor of the state of Oregon. He took office on September 13, 1882 and served until January 12, 1887.

== Family ==
Moody married Mary Stephenson in Brownsville on November 19, 1853. They would have five children, including Malcolm A. Moody, who would serve in the United States Congress, and Ralph E. Moody, who would serve in the Oregon House of Representatives and as assistant attorney general of Oregon.

== Death ==
Moody died in Salem on March 14, 1917.

Party political offices
Preceded by Cornelius C. Beekman	Republican nominee for Governor of Oregon; 1882	Succeeded by Thomas R. Cornelius
Political offices
Preceded by W. W. Thayer	Governor of Oregon; 1882-1887	Succeeded by Sylvester Pennoyer
